= Genesee County B League =

- Sport: High school sports
- First season: ?
- Folded: 1978
- Country: United States

The Genesee County B League was a high school sport league in Genesee County Michigan that operated in the mid to late 20th century.

High School	Join Year	From	Left	league left to
Ainsworth	1954		1961	Big Nine Conference
Atherton	1960		1976	Mid-Eastern Eight Conference
Beecher	1950		1960	Big Nine Conference
Bendle	1950		1975	Mid-Eastern Eight Conference
Bentley	1960		1978	Genesee Eight
Brandon	1977		1978	Five County 5 League
Clio	1950		1960	Big Nine Conference
Davison	1950		1960	Big Nine Conference
Durand	1964		1978	Flint Metro League
Fenton	1940		1968	Flint Metro League
Flushing	1950		1960	Big Nine Conference
Grand Blanc	1950		1960	Big Nine Conference
Hartland	1976		1978	Five County 5
Kearsley	1950		1960	Big Nine Conference
Lake Fenton	1976		1978	Genesee Eight
LakeVille	1956; 2nd: 1964		1962; 2nd: 1976	Independent; 2nd: Flint Metro League
Linden	1974		1978	Genesee Eight
Mt. Morris	1950		1960	Big Nine Conference
Swartz Creek	1960	County C League	1968	Flint Metro League
