= Genesee Area Conference =

- Formerly: Genesee Eight Conference
- Sport: high school
- Founded: 1978
- Country: {USA}

The Genesee Area Conference (GAC) is a high school athletic conference in Genesee County, Michigan. It was originally called the Genesee Eight Athletic Conference. Since 2002, the GAC operates with two divisions: Blue and Red. In 2019, all members of the red division left to join the Flint Metro League conference, leaving the GAC with only four teams.

== History ==
The Genesee Eight Athletic Conference began in 1978 with three high schools from the Genesee County B League and five from the Mid-Eastern Eight Conference. Beginning in 1999, the Conference renamed itself to Genesee Area Conference with the addition of Genesee High School to bring up the number of High Schools to ten. The Genesee Wolves also took the Football championship that year. With the 2002 football season, the GAC split the Conference into two divisions (Blue and Red) of six high schools with the addition of Mt. Morris and Lakeville High Schools. In recent years, however, it has lost a large number of members. As in 2018, six of its members broke off from the conference to form the Mid-Michigan Activities Conference, and three of its members left to join the Flint Metro League. 2019 saw it gain a member in Flint Southwestern, but also lose a member in Bentley.

== Member schools ==
=== Current members ===
Team	Location	Class	Enrollment	Joined	Previous Conference
Atherton Wolverines	Burton	C	255	1978	Mid-Eastern 8 Conference
Beecher Buccaneers	Mt. Morris Township	C	231	2009	Independents (FML 2002)
Bendle Tigers	Burton	C	325	1978	Mid-Eastern Eight Conference
Bentley Bulldogs	Burton	C	274	1978	Genesee County B League
Genesee Christian Soldiers	Burton	D	106	2020	Michigan Association of Christian Schools
Hamady Hawks	Mt. Morris Township	B	476	1978	Mid-Eastern 8 Conference
International Phoenix	Flint	C	200	2020	
Madison Eagles	Burton	C	203	2020	
Morrice Orioles	Morrice	D	161	2010	Independents (SMAA 2008)
New Standard Warriors	Flint	D	146	2020	
Southwestern Knights	Flint	A	857	2019	Saginaw Valley Conference
Webberville Spartans	Webberville	D	168	2010	Independents (SMAA 2008)

=== Current Divisions ===
Genesee Area Conference
Blue	Red
Webberville	Beecher
Madison Academy	Genesee Christian
International Academy	Bendle
Morrice	Bentley
Atherton	Hamady

=== Former members ===
Team	Location	Joined	Previous Conference	Departed	Successive Conference
Linden Eagles	Argentine Township	1978	Genesee County B League	1982	Independent
Montrose Rams	Montrose	1978	Mid-Eastern Eight Conference	2018	Mid-Michigan Activities Conference
New Lothrop Hornets	New Lothrop	1982	Independent	2018	Mid-Michigan Activities Conference
Byron Eagles	Byron	1991	Mid-State Athletic Conference	2018	Mid-Michigan Activities Conference
Goodrich Martians	Atlas Township	1978	Mid-Eastern Eight Conference	2019	Flint Metro League
Corunna Cavaliers	Corunna	2014	Capital Area Activities Conference	2019	Flint Metro League
Lake Fenton Blue Devils	Fenton Township	1978	Genesee County B League	2019	Flint Metro League
Pontiac Notre Dame Prep Fighting Irish	Pontiac	2018	Independent	2019	Independent
Genesee Wolves	Genesee Township	1999	Southern Thumb Athletic Association	2018	North Central Thumb 8-Man League
Otisville LakeVille Falcons	Otisville	2002/2017	Flint Metro League/Tri-Valley Conference	2013/2018	Tri-Valley Conference/Mid-Michigan Activities Conference
Mount Morris Panthers	Mount Morris	2002	Flint Metro League	2018	Mid-Michigan Activities Conference
Durand Railroaders	Durand	2005	Mid-Michigan Athletic Conference - B	2018	Mid-Michigan Activities Conference
Dryden Cardinals	Dryden Township	2010	North Central Thumb League	2013	North Central Thumb 8-Man League
Morrice Orioles	Morrice	2010	Independent	2014	Central Michigan 8-Man Football Conference
Perry Ramblers	Perry	2012	Capital Area Activities Conference	2014	Greater Lansing Athletic Conference

== Football ==
This conference championship list goes through the 2018 season. Morrice and Webberville complete in the Central Michigan 8-Man Football Conference.

#	Team	G8/GAC Championships	State Division Championships
1	Montrose	1981, 1983–1985, 1988–1996, 1998–2001, 2002, 2003, 2005, 2007, 2011-2013	1998 (Class CC), 2002 (Division 5)
2	New Lothrop	1983, 2002-2006, 2010-2017	2006 (Division 8), 2018 (Division 6)
3	Lake Fenton	1978, 2005-2007, 2016-2017	
3	Goodrich	2003, 2004, 2008, 2010, 2015, 2018	
4	Flint Hamady	1979, 1980, 1982, 2007, 2018	
6	Burton Bendle	1986, 1997	
7	Mt. Morris	2003, 2005	
7	Genesee	1999, 2009	
7	Flint Beecher	2009, 2014	
10	Linden	1981	
10	Burton Bentley	1987, 2008	
10	Corunna	2015	
