= Genesee County C League =

Genesee County B League
- Sport: High school
- First season: ?
- Folded: 1960
- Country: United States

The Genesee County C League was a high school sport league in Genesee County Michigan that operated in the mid-20th century with Class C size schools.

High School	Join Year	From	Left	league left to
Ainsworth	1950		1954	Genesee County B
Otisville	1950		1954	merged to Otisville Lakeville Falcons
Hoover	1950		1955	independent
Saint Mary (Mount Morris)	1950		1956	Motor Valley
Lakeville	1955	new	1956	Genesee County B
Dye	1950		1960	Flint Suburban
Goodrich	1950		1960	Flint Suburban
Linden	1950		1960	Flint Suburban
Montrose	1950		1960	Flint Suburban
Utley	1950		1960	Flint Suburban
Swartz Creek	1950		1960	Genesee County B
Bentley	1952	independent	1960	Genesee County B
Atherton	1954	independent	1960	Genesee County B
