= Big Nine Conference (Michigan) =

- Sport: Football, baseball, basketball, golf, soccer, swimming, volleyball, wrestling
- Founded: 1968
- Folded: 2012
- No. of teams: 4
- Country: United States

The Big Nine Conference, formerly the Big Eight Conference, was a high school sports conference in Genesee County, Michigan, that ended with four high schools in 2012.

== History ==
Formed in 1960 as the Big Eight Conference, the conference became the Big Nine Conference in 1962 with the addition of Mt. Morris High School. Ainsworth High School left in 1968, and Mt. Morris left in 1972. Powers Catholic High School joined in 1974. In 1976, Carman High School and Swartz Creek High School were added from the Flint Metro League, giving the conference its peak membership of 10. Due to the collegiate Big Ten Conference, the conference's name remained the Big Nine Conference.

Membership in the Big Nine remained stable for the next 21 years, with only the newly merged Carman-Ainsworth taking Carman's place in the conference in 1986. Owosso High School left in 1997 for the Mid-Michigan Athletic Conference - A. Beecher left the league after the 2002 season. In 2003, the Owosso Trojans returned to the league after the Mid-Michigan Athletic Conference - A dispersed.

Clio in 2005 and Swartz Creek in 2006 moved to the Flint Metro League as the conference was perceived as being overpowering to those schools.

In 2006, the entire Big Nine Conference and Flint Northwestern applied for membership in the Flint Metro League to encourage discussion on a merger. As a result of that and Kearsley's interest back in 2005–2006, a membership invitation was extended to Kearsley. In 2007, Owosso left for the Capital Area Activities Conference - Red.

Grand Blanc Schools moved to the Kensington Lakes Activities Association starting in the 2009–2010 season. In August 2011, the remaining Big Nine members applied together to join the Saginaw Valley League and were accepted to join starting in the 2012–2013 school year, forming Saginaw Valley's southern division with the other Flint City District High Schools.

== Membership ==
The conference had 13 different members over the course of its history. Of the 11 existing former members, four are in the Flint Metro League, three are in the Saginaw Valley League, two are in the Genesee Area Conference, one is in the Kensington Lakes Activities Association, and one is in the Capital Area Activities Conference.

School	Location	Tenure	Subsequent conference membership
Ainsworth High School	Mundy Township	1960–1968	Flint Metro League (1968–1986) closed in 1986 (merged into Carman)
Beecher High School	Beecher	1960–2002	Independent (2002–2009)
Carman High School	Flint Township	1976–1986	(renamed with Ainsworth students move to Carman)
Carman-Ainsworth High School	Flint Township	1986–2012	Saginaw Valley League (2012–present)
Clio High School	Clio	1960–2005	Flint Metro League (2005–present)
Davison High School	Davison	1960–2012	Saginaw Valley League (2012–present)
Flushing High School	Flushing	1960–2012	Saginaw Valley League (2012–2014); Flint Metro League (2014-present)
Grand Blanc High School	Grand Blanc	1960–2009	Kensington Lakes Activities Association (2009–2017) Saginaw Valley League (2018-present)
Kearsley High School	Flint	1960–2008	Flint Metro League (2008–present)
Mount Morris High School	Mount Morris	1962–1972	Flint Metro League (1972–2002); Genesee Area Conference (2002–present)
Owosso High School	Owosso	1960–1997; 2003–2007	Mid-Michigan Athletic Conference - A (1997–2003); Capital Area Activities Conference (2007–2016) Flint Metro League (2017-present)
Powers Catholic High School	Flint	1974–2012	Saginaw Valley League (2012–present)
Swartz Creek High School	Swartz Creek	1976–2006	Flint Metro League (2006–present)
