= Flint Metro League =

Sports league

- Sport: Baseball; Basketball; Football; Soccer; Volleyball
- Founded: 1968
- CEO: Executive Director: Gary Oyster
- No. of teams: 12
- Country: United States
- Website: Flint Metro League

Flint Metro League (FML) is a high school sports league in the Flint area of Michigan. It is composed of twelve high schools.

== History ==
In 1968, six Flint area schools formed a new league to play against schools of similar size and to cut down on travel for some schools. Two teams, Fenton and Swartz Creek, joined from the County B League, and one each from the Big Nine Conference (Ainsworth), Wayne-Oakland League (Holly) and Tri-County League (Lapeer High) and a new high school: Carman. The league in 1983 contained 10 schools but by 2002 there were seven teams. Clio in 2005 and Swartz Creek in 2006 moved to the Flint Metro League as the conference was perceived as being overpowering to those schools.

In 2006, the entire Big Nine Conference applied for membership in the league to encourage discussion on a merger. As a result of that and Kearsley's interest back in 2005–2006, a membership invitation was extended to Kearsley.

In 2014, Flushing Schools joined the Flint Metro League from the Saginaw Valley Conference, replacing Lapeer East and West, which merged into Lapeer High and left the FML, while in 2017, Owosso High School joined the FML after leaving the Capital Area Activities Conference.

In 2019, three members of the Genesee Area Conference left that conference to join the Flint Metro League, expanding the league to twelve teams and two divisions.

== Member schools ==
=== Current members ===
School	Nickname	Location	Joined	Previous conference
Fenton	Tigers	Fenton	1968	Genesee County B League
Flint Kearsley	Hornets	Genesee Township	2008	Big Nine Conference
Flushing	Raiders	Flushing Township	2014	Saginaw Valley League
Holly	Bronchos	Holly Township	1968	Wayne-Oakland County League
Linden	Eagles	Argentine Township	1984	Independent
Swartz Creek	Dragons	Swartz Creek	1968	Genesee County B League
Swartz Creek	Dragons	Swartz Creek	2006	Big Nine Conference
Ortonville Brandon	Blackhawks	Brandon Township	2002	Oakland Activities Association
Clio	Mustangs	Vienna Township	2005	Big Nine Conference
Owosso	Trojans	Owosso	2017	Capital Area Activities Conference
Goodrich	Martians	Goodrich	2019	Genesee Area Conference
Corunna	Cavaliers	Corunna	2019	Genesee Area Conference
Lake Fenton	Blue Devils	Fenton	2019	Genesee Area Conference

=== Former members ===
School	Nickname	Location	Joined	Previous conference	Departed	Successive conference
Flint Ainsworth	Spartans	Mundy Township	1968	Independent	1986	None (school closed)
Flint Carman	Cougars	Flint Township	1968	Independent	1976	Big Nine Conference
Durand	Railroaders	Durand	1978	Independent	1997	Mid-Michigan "B" Conference
Lapeer East	Eagles	Lapeer	1976	Independent	2014	None (school consolidated)
Lapeer West	Panthers	Lapeer	1968	Independent	2014	None (school closed)
Mount Morris	Panthers	Mount Morris Township	1972	Big Nine Conference	2003	Genesee Area Conference
Otisville LakeVille	Falcons	Forest Township	1976	Genesee County B League	2002	Genesee Area Conference
Oxford	Wildcats	Oxford Township	1984	North Oakland Activities Conference	2010	Oakland Activities Association

== Football ==
This list goes through the 2016 season.

#	Team	FML Championships	State Division Championship
1	Fenton	1972, 1977, 1983-1985, 1987, 1989, 1998, 2008, 2011-2017, 2019	
2	Lapeer West	1968, 1974, 1989, 1995-1997, 2000, 2001, 2003, 2007, 2013	1995 (Class A)
3	Oxford	1986, 1989-1994, 1998-2000, 2007, 2008	1992 (Class BB)
4	Linden	1986, 2002, 2005, 2006, 2008, 2009, 2010	
5	Flint Carman	1969-1973	
5	Flint Ainsworth	1975-1977, 1980, 1981	
7	Durand	1981-1983	
8	Swartz Creek	1970, 1972	
8	Otisville LakeVille	1978, 1979	
8	Lapeer East	2004, 2011	
8	Holly	2011, 2012	
12	Mt. Morris	1988	
12	Ortonville Brandon	2018	
12	Flushing	2018	

== Basketball ==
Conference Champions (Boys)
Year	Stars	Coach	Stripes	Coach	Season End
2022	Goodrich (9-1)	Gary Barns	Flushing (8-2)	Eric Smith	

Conference Champions (Girls)
Year	Stars	Coach	Stripes	Coach	Season End
2022	Lake Fenton (10-0)	Brian VanBuren	Flushing 18-4 (10-0)	Larry Ford	LF (F (Dist-F loss to Carman-Ainsworth
