= Atherton Community Schools =

- Entrance to Atherton Junior Senior High School

Address
- 3354 S. Genesee Rd Mid-Michigan Midwest Burton, Michigan, Genesee, Michigan, 48519, 48519; United States
- Coordinates: 42°58′41.1″N 83°36′54.8″W

District information
- Type: Public
- Grades: PreK–12
- Established: 1836; 190 years ago
- President: Craig Lanter
- Vice-president: Bette Bigsby
- Superintendent: Tina Davis

Students and staff
- Students: 750 (2021–22)
- Teachers: 49.49 (FTE)
- Student–teacher ratio: 15.15
- District mascot: Wolverines
- Colors: Black, Light Blue, Grey/Silver, and White

Other information
- Website: www.athertonschools.org

Atherton Community Schools is a public school district in Burton, Michigan. Atherton is one of five public school districts serving Burton in Genesee County. Atherton Community Schools is a constituent district within the Genesee Intermediate School District. Atherton Community Schools runs three schools: Atherton Junior/Senior High School, Atherton Elementary School, and an Atherton Virtual Academy.

== History ==
Atherton opened as a one-room log schoolhouse at Atherton and Center roads corner in 1836 within the then newly formed Flint Township, Michigan (later Township of Burton, now City of Burton) for the Atherton Settlement just founded a year before. The school district is named after the first teacher, Betsey Atherton, daughter of Adonijah Atherton—one of the town’s first settlers. Betsey died a few months later. The district in 1878 had funding of $1,832, 17 teachers and eight schoolhouses.

Four elementary schools eventual replaced the eight schoolhouses: Fisk, H.W. Medler, Metzger and Herbst. Those elementary schools operated until the late 1960s. Fisk was on Manor Drive and is currently a daycare. The remaining two, Metzger on Sitka Street and Herbst on Clarice Street, were demolished. Medler became the high school which graduated its first class in 1954. The current Atherton High School was built in 1965 next to Medler. Medler then became the middle school until 1969 when the middle school opened south of the high school. Medler then held sixth grade students only. Medler was hit by lightning in the early morning hours in the summer of 1977, causing the back half of the building to burn down. H.W. Medler was on Genesee Road and is currently a charter school. On December 9, 2003, a consolidation vote for the three all Burton school districts took place with Atherton and Bentley voters in favor of consolidation and Bendle voters not in favor.

In 2003, a plan of merger was accepted by the State Superintendent of Education between Atherton and Bentley School Districts, which subsequently failed when presented to voters. The School District celebrated their 175th year in 2011, making the school about 1 year older than the State of Michigan itself.

In February 2013, the Atherton School Board began discussing the closure of Vern Van Y Elementary School due to a decline student count. Van Y closed at the conclusion of the 2012–13 school year, the previous student body of Van Y Elementary school consolidated to serve grades K-6 at Atherton Elementary School. Beginning in the 2013–14 school year, the district operates as a two school district. Atherton Elementary (formerly Atherton Junior High) houses grades K–6. Atherton Junior/Senior High (formerly Atherton Senior High) houses grades 7–12.

== Sports ==
Atherton Wolverines
- School: Atherton High School
- MHSAA: Blue
- Conference: Genesee Area
- Athletic director: Desmond Stephens
- Location: Burton, Michigan
- Varsity teams: Baseball, Men's Basketball, Women's Basketball, Men's Bowling, Women's Bowling, Cheerleading, Football, Golf, Marching Band, Softball, Track & Field, Men's Volleyball, Women's Volleyball (7 men's, 6 women's, 2 co-ed)
- Colors: Black, Light Blue, and White
- Mascot: Wolverines
- Fight song: On Wisconsin
- Website: https://www.athertonschools.org/page/athletics

Atherton High School is a class C school district.

League	Start 1836	End
independent	1952	1954
County C	1954	1960
County B	1960	1976
Mid-Eastern Eight	1976	1978
Genesee Eight (Genesee Area 1999–Present)	1978	Present
