= Genesee Intermediate School District =

Intermediate School District in Michigan, United States

Address
- 2413 West Maple Ave Flint, Michigan, 48507; United States
- Coordinates: 42°57′29.0″N 83°43′39.5″W

District information
- Type: Intermediate School District
- President: Jerry G. Ragsdale
- Superintendent: Lisa A. Hagel
- Budget: $161,925,000 (2021-22)
- NCES District ID: 2680400

Students and staff
- Students: 2,800 (2021-22)
- Teachers: 266
- Staff: 863
- Student–teacher ratio: 10:1

Other information
- Website: www.geneseeisd.org

Genesee Intermediate School District is an Intermediate school district in Michigan serving the school districts that primarily lies within Genesee County.

== Schools ==
=== Direct schools ===
- Early Childhood Programs and Services
- Elmer A. Knopf Learning Center
- Genesee Career Institute
- Genesee County Career Technical Education Early Middle College
- Genesee Early College
- Marion D. Crouse Instructional Center
- Mott Middle College
- Transition Center

=== Public school districts ===
- Atherton Community Schools
- Beecher Community School District
- Bendle Public Schools
- Bentley Community Schools
- Carman-Ainsworth Community Schools
- Clio Area Schools
- Davison Community Schools
- Fenton Area Public Schools
- Flint Community Schools
- Flushing Community Schools
- Genesee School District
- Goodrich Area Schools
- Grand Blanc Community Schools
- Kearsley Community Schools
- Lake Fenton Community Schools
- LakeVille Community Schools
- Linden Community Schools
- Montrose Community Schools
- Mount Morris Consolidated Schools
- Swartz Creek Community Schools
- Westwood Heights Schools

=== Charter schools ===
- Burton Glen Academy
- Center Academy
- Flint Cultural Center Academy
- Genesee STEM Academy
- Grand Blanc Academy
- Greater Heights Academy
- International Academy of Flint
- Linden Charter Academy
- Madison Academy
- Northridge Academy
- Richfield Public School Academy
- The New Standard Academy
- WAY Academy Of Flint
- Woodland Park Academy
