= Carman-Ainsworth =

Carman-Ainsworth may refer to:

- Carman-Ainsworth Community Schools, school district in Genesee County, MI
- Carman-Ainsworth High School, senior high school in the district
