= Big Nine Conference =

Big Nine Conference may refer to:

- Big Ten Conference, known as the Big Nine Conference in 1899–1917 and 1946–1950
- Big Nine Conference (Michigan), defunct high school athletic conference (1968–2012)
- Big Nine Conference (Wisconsin), defunct high school athletic conference (1985–1993)
