= Fenton Area Public Schools =

School district in Michigan

Address
- 3100 Owen Road Fenton, Genesee, Michigan, 48430; United States
- Coordinates: 42°47′22″N 83°43′55″W

District information
- Grades: PreK–12
- Superintendent: Heidie Ciesielski
- Budget: $47,840,000 2022-2023 expenditures
- NCES District ID: 2614250

Students and staff
- Enrollment: 2,872 (2024-2025)
- Teachers: 190.96 FTE (2024-2025)
- Staff: 444.87 FTE (2024-2025)
- Student–teacher ratio: 15.04 (2024-2025)
- Athletic conference: Flint Metro League
- District mascot: Tigers
- Colors: Orange and black

Other information
- Intermediate District: Genesee
- Website: fentonschools.org

Fenton Area Public Schools is a public school district in Genesee County in the U.S. state of Michigan and in the Genesee Intermediate School District. It serves the city of Fenton and part of Fenton Township, Michigan in Genesee County, part of Tyrone Township in Livingston County and part of Springfield Township in Oakland County.

== History ==
The Ellen Street Campus at 404 West Ellen Street was formerly Fenton High School. In 1956, voters approved a bond issue to expand the high school and build two elementary schools. The two elementary schools, North Road and State Road, opened in fall 1957. The current Fenton High School opened in 1969, and Schmidt Middle School opened in 2000.

== Schools ==
Schools in Fenton Area Public Schools
School	Address	Notes
Fenton High School	3200 W. Shiawassee Ave, Fenton, MI 48430	Grades 9–12. Opened fall 1969.
Andrew G. Schmidt Middle School	3255 Donaldson Dr, Fenton	Serves grades 6–8. Opened fall 2000.
North Road Elementary School	525 North Road, Fenton	Grades K-5
State Road Elementary School	1161 W. State Rd, Fenton	Grades K-5. Opened fall 1957.
Tomek Eastern Elementary School	600 Fourth St, Fenton	Grades K-5
Ellen Street Campus / World of Wonder preschool	404 W. Ellen St, Fenton	Preschool, formerly Fenton High School.
Fenton Alternative Academy	3100 Owen Rd., Fenton	Alternative high school
