= Swartz Creek Community Schools =

School district in Michigan

Swartz Creek Community School District
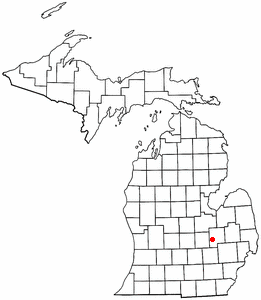
- Location of Swartz Creek School District within Genesee County, Michigan

Address
- 8354 Cappy Lane Swartz Creek, Genesee, Michigan, 49348; United States

District information
- Grades: Pre-Kindergarten-12
- Superintendent: Rodney Hetherton
- Schools: 8
- Budget: $59,271,000 2022-2023 expenditures
- NCES District ID: 2633420

Students and staff
- Students: 3,483 (2024-2025)
- Teachers: 185.83 (on an FTE basis) (2024-2025)
- Staff: 397.84 FTE (2024-2025)
- Student–teacher ratio: 18.74 (2024-2025)

Other information
- Website: www.swartzcreek.org

Swartz Creek Community Schools is a public school district in Genesee County, Michigan and in the Genesee Intermediate School District. It serves Swartz Creek, Gaines, and parts of Flint, Argentine Township, Flint Charter Township, Gaines Township, Clayton Township, Mundy Township.

== History ==
Swartz Creek Community Schools were first organized on June 2, 1840. A crude log schoolhouse was constructed as the first school building. In the spring of 1842, the first tax levy of $100 was voted to build a new schoolhouse, as the old one had burned down earlier that year. This new schoolhouse also doubled as a church, It was later destroyed by fire in 1859. In 1851, Swartz Creek Schools consisted of two buildings, the old schoolhouse, and the new "first" little red schoolhouse (completed in 1853). In 1887, the old red schoolhouse was becoming too small for the community. A second school was constructed of red brick in 1891 on Morrish Road south of the railroad tracks. Swartz Creek Schools now had three buildings. The school district, now Including grades one through ten, was growing. In 1903, the red schoolhouse was given a new addition to accommodate high school students. In 1910, the first kindergarten class was formed. As Swartz Creek grew, there was need for additional space.

In 1928, Stanford T. Crapo donated five acres and $40,000 for a new school building. The school district matched Stanford's $40,000 donation with a bond to build the Mary Crapo School, with construction begin in 1928 and opened in 1929. The new school was formally named the Mary Crapo School after Crapo's grandmother, and former Michigan Governor Henry H. Crapo's wife. S.T. Crapo's five acres donation was part of the Crapo Farm land The building original held all grades including kindergarten. The first graduating class of 1930 had four students.

With consolidation of a number of one room schoolhouse districts, Mary Crapo had a western wing added. The current high school was built in 1958 followed by the middle school and most of the current elementary schools. In 1983, Center Stage community theater group made Mary Crapo its performance home.

As the district continued to grow, there was need for transportation. By 1945, the district had a four-bus fleet. The first hot lunch program was instituted in 1947. In the fall of 1947 voters moved to consolidate Mary Crapo, Crocker, Hill, Kline, Fletcher, Grove, Irish, and Ryno school districts into the Swartz Creek Rural Agricultural Community School District.

The advent of school busing changed the district boundaries. In 1948, the Begole School was annexed into the district, and Mary Crapo had been enlarged to accommodate the growth in population. In 1956, ground was broken for the new high school. On January 19, 1958, the new high school was dedicated. In the years from 1959-1969, the district constructed Syring, Morrish, Elms and Dieck Elementary buildings, made new additions to the high school, completed the middle school and annexed the Gaines School system. The middle school was built, equipped and furnished for sixth, seventh and eighth graders. By then, the school population had reached over 4,000.

Community Education was organized in 1971, and by the fall of 1972, college extension courses were offered. In 1974, the new administration building was constructed and opened.

On May 8, 2008, two bond millage were on the ballot, one for a new high school and technology upgrades. The second to build an auditorium at the new high school.

The Building and Site Fund levy was renewed at a 1.8 mills in May 2011. The school board agreed on June 9, 2011, to purchase the Cage Fieldhouse from Cage Management Group for additional sports practice space with the Cage Group to manage the facility. On June 23, 2011, the school board approved the design of the performing arts center. The center was funded via a qualified school construction bond, a part of the federal stimulus package, to be paid back via the existing Building and Site Fund millage. The center was official opened on September 5, 2013. The center was official opened on September 5, 2013. Center Stage held 100 plays at Mary Crapo by the time they left the school in 2013.

In June 2014, Swartz Creek and Clio School District agreed to share administrative staff. First, the two district agreed to share a finance director follow by sharing an executive director of personnel.

In early 2018, the school board voted to close Mary Crapo building at the end of the school year and move the Child Development Center and Swartz Creek Academy (alternative education) to a former doctor's office on Morrish Road and to the middle school, respectively. The move would cost less than the $625,000 needed to fix and upgrade Crapo.

In 2019 the high school upgraded, modernized, and expanded its athletic field complex.

In 2021 Multiple additions would be added to the community schools, middle school, and high school.

== Schools ==
Schools in Swartz Creek Community Schools district
School	Address	Notes
Swartz Creek High School	One Dragon Drive, Swartz Creek	Grades 9-12.
Swartz Creek Middle School	8230 Crapo Drive, Swartz Creek	Grades 6-8.
Dieck Elementary	2239 Van Vleet Road, Swartz Creek	Grades 3-5.
Elms Road Elementary	3259 Elms Road, Swartz Creek	Grades 3-5.
Gaines Elementary	300 East Lansing Street, Gaines	Grades K-5.
Morrish Elementary	5055 Maple Road, Swartz Creek	Grades K-2.
Syring Elementary	5300 Oakview Drive, Swartz Creek	Grades PreK-2.
Little Dragons Learning Center		Preschool.
Swartz Creek Virtual Learning Center	8230 Crapo Street, Swartz Creek	Online school for grades 6-12.

== High school ==
The Swartz Creek High School is a secondary school in Swartz Creek built in 1958. The school was initially constructed with a 900–1,000 student capacity. Immediately after opening, the district had plans to add two new wings.

== Sports ==
Swartz Creek Community School
- School: Swartz Creek High
- Nickname: Dragons
- Conference: Flint Metro League
- Athletic director: Sue Calvo
- Location: Swartz Creek, Michigan
- Varsity teams: football, cross country, basketball, Baseball, Volleyball, Soccer, Tennis, Swimming, Lacrosse, Track, Golf, Ice Hockey
- Colors: Red and White
- Website: Swartz Creek Athletics

Class	A
Year Joined/Rejoined	1968/2006

League	Start	End
County C	1950	1960
County B	1960	1968
Flint Metro	1968	1976
Big 9	1976	2006
Flint Metro	2006	present

At the Little Red School House No.2 back in the late 19th century, Swartz Creek Schools started its sports tradition starting with a championship girls baseball team followed by a winning boys baseball team. In the 1940s, the football team earned the county championship trophy awarded by the Flint Journal, which nicknamed the Swartz Creek Teams as the "Dragons", after which the yearbook was called the dragon. Swartz Creek belong to the County B League then joined the Flint Metro League upon its founding in 1968 until the 1976 when they joined the Big Nine Conference. The Cross Country squad had extraordinary success racking 15 Big Nine Conference championships, many Greater Flint Area Champions, Regional Champions, multiple state meet appearances with runners up in 1982 and State Championship in 1986. Given the even large schools in the Big 9 that were some times classified as AA making teams uncompetitive in league play, Swartz Creek returned to the Flint Metro League in 2006.

== Notable alumni ==
- Erik Jones (Class of 2014) — NASCAR Cup Series driver
- Steve Smith (1976–1979), CFL quarterback
