= Kearsley Township, Michigan =

- Former civil township
- Former location within the state of Michigan
- Coordinates: 43°02′N 83°44′W
- Country: United States
- State: Michigan
- County: Genesee
- Organized: 1839
- Dissolved: 1843
- Time zone: UTC-5 (Eastern (EST))
  - Summer (DST): UTC-4 (EDT)

The Township of Kearsley was a civil township in Genesee County in the U.S. state of Michigan organized April 19, 1839 from part of then Flint Township of its Township 7 north of range 7 sections 1-5 and 8-17. This is approximately the area encompassed today by N. Saginaw St. to the east, W. Pasadena Ave. to the north, west of Dye Rd. to the west, and Corunna Rd. to the south.

Major Jonathan Kearsley was receiver in the United States land office in Detroit in the early 1800s from which all land in Genesee County was sold until 1836 when a Flint land office was opened. Kearsley Creek, Kearsley Community Schools, and one of the principal Flint city streets was named after him. Kearsley was given its own post office on August 25, 1841 with its initial postmaster Ogden Carke. The state legislature merged Kearsley Township back into Flint Township on March 7, 1843. Later, the Township's territory was absorbed into Genesee and Burton Townships and some of which became incorporated into the City of Flint. While the post office closed on January 11, 1867.
