= Genesee County Courthouse (Michigan) =

- Genesee County Courthouse and Jail
- U.S. National Register of Historic Places
- Michigan State Historic Site
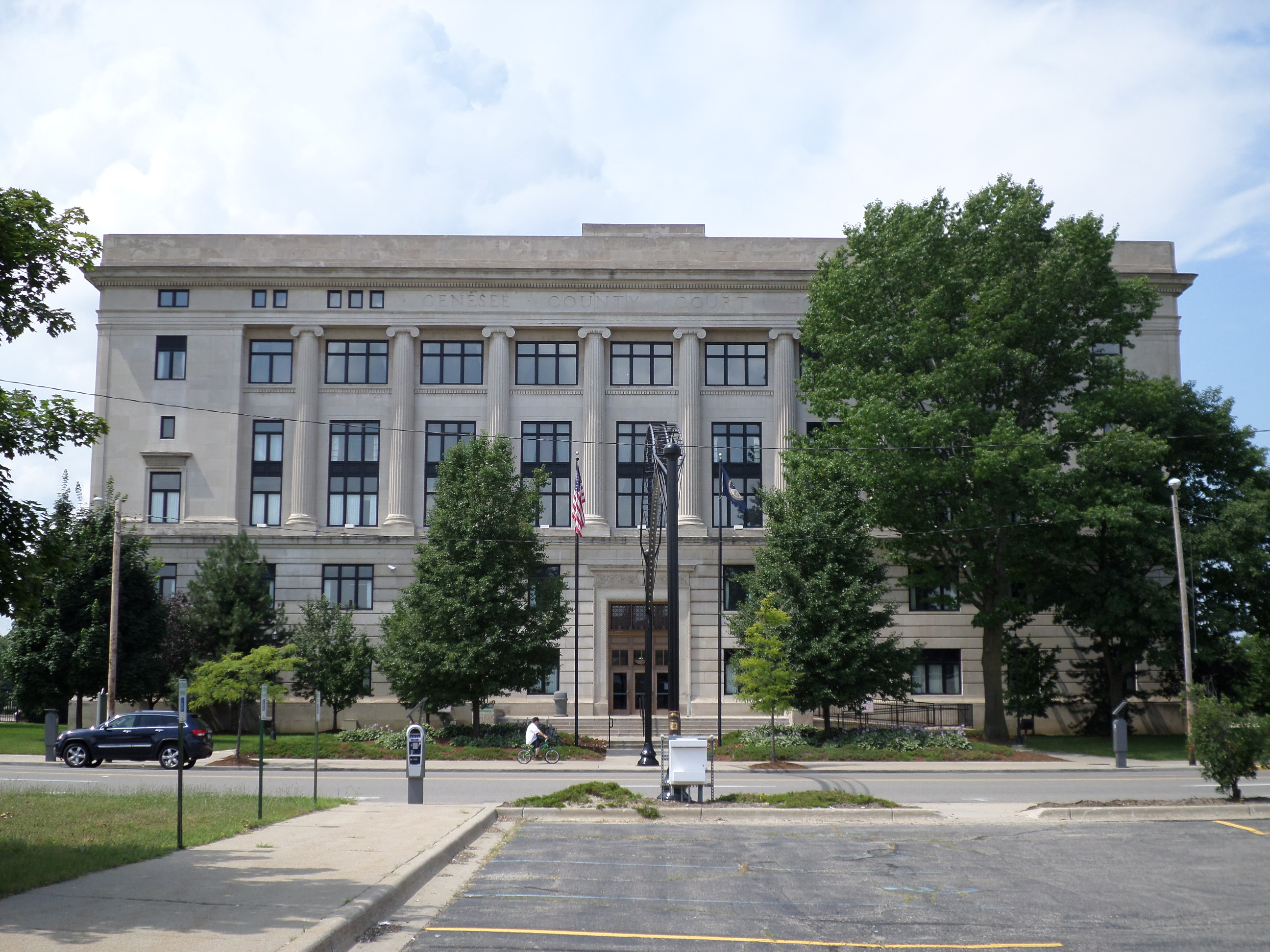

- Location within Michigan Location within the United States
- Interactive map showing the location of Genesee County Courthouse
- Location: 920 S. Saginaw St., Flint, Michigan
- Coordinates: 43°00′42″N 83°41′17″W
- Area: 3 acres (1.2 ha)
- Built: 1925
- Built by: F. R. Patterson Construction Company
- Architect: Frederick D. Madison
- Architectural style: Classical Revival
- NRHP reference No.: 90000798
- Added to NRHP: May 24, 1990

The Genesee County Courthouse is a government building located at 920 South Saginaw Street in Flint, Michigan. It was listed on the National Register of Historic Places in 1990.

== History ==
Genesee County was carved out in 1835, and the land for the courthouse square was immediately identified. The owners at the time donated it to the county at the end of the year, and the county government was formally recognized by the territory of Michigan in 1836. The county courts first met in various stores, and the first courthouse at the current site, a log structure, was constructed in 1838–1839. The log building was deemed unsafe to hold county records, and in 1851 a brick office building was added. The log courthouse burned in 1866, and by 1867 the county constructed a new courthouse, jail, and sheriff's office. By the early 1900s, these buildings were too small for the county, and in 1904–1905, a new a new Renaissance Revival-style courthouse and jail were constructed.

The 1905 courthouse burned in 1923, and after much wrangling, voters approved the construction of a new courthouse in 1925. Frederick D. Madison of Royal Oak, Michigan, was selected as architect and F. R. Patterson Construction Company, also of Royal Oak, was selected as the contractor. Work began in 1925, and was completed in 1926. A new matching jail, also designed by Madison, was constructed in 1930–1931.

A new county building was constructed in 1966, and some county functions were moved, but the main courthouse remained in use. An addition to the jail was constructed in 1971. In 1999, ground was broken on a substantial addition. Renovation of the 1931 courthouse was also carried out, and the building was rededicated in 1923.

== Description ==
The Genesee County Courthouse is a five-story, rectangular, Classical Revival, reinforced concrete-frame building. It is faced in Indiana limestone. The main facade is divided visually into three horizontal bands. The two-story base is finished in stone and capped with a classical cornice. Atop that is a two-story section containing a row of monumental extending across the central section of the facade. Atop the columns is a classical entablature, above which is a massive flat-topped parapet. On the interior, the older section of the courthouse contains seven courtrooms.

Nearby is the former county jail, which is a six-story building, which is constructed in a similar scale, and from similar materials, as the courthouse.
