= The Flint Enquirer =

The Flint Enquirer is a small-circulation newspaper serving the African American community of Genesee County, Michigan. It is distributed at local colleges and other locations.
