= Thetford Township, Michigan =

- Civil township
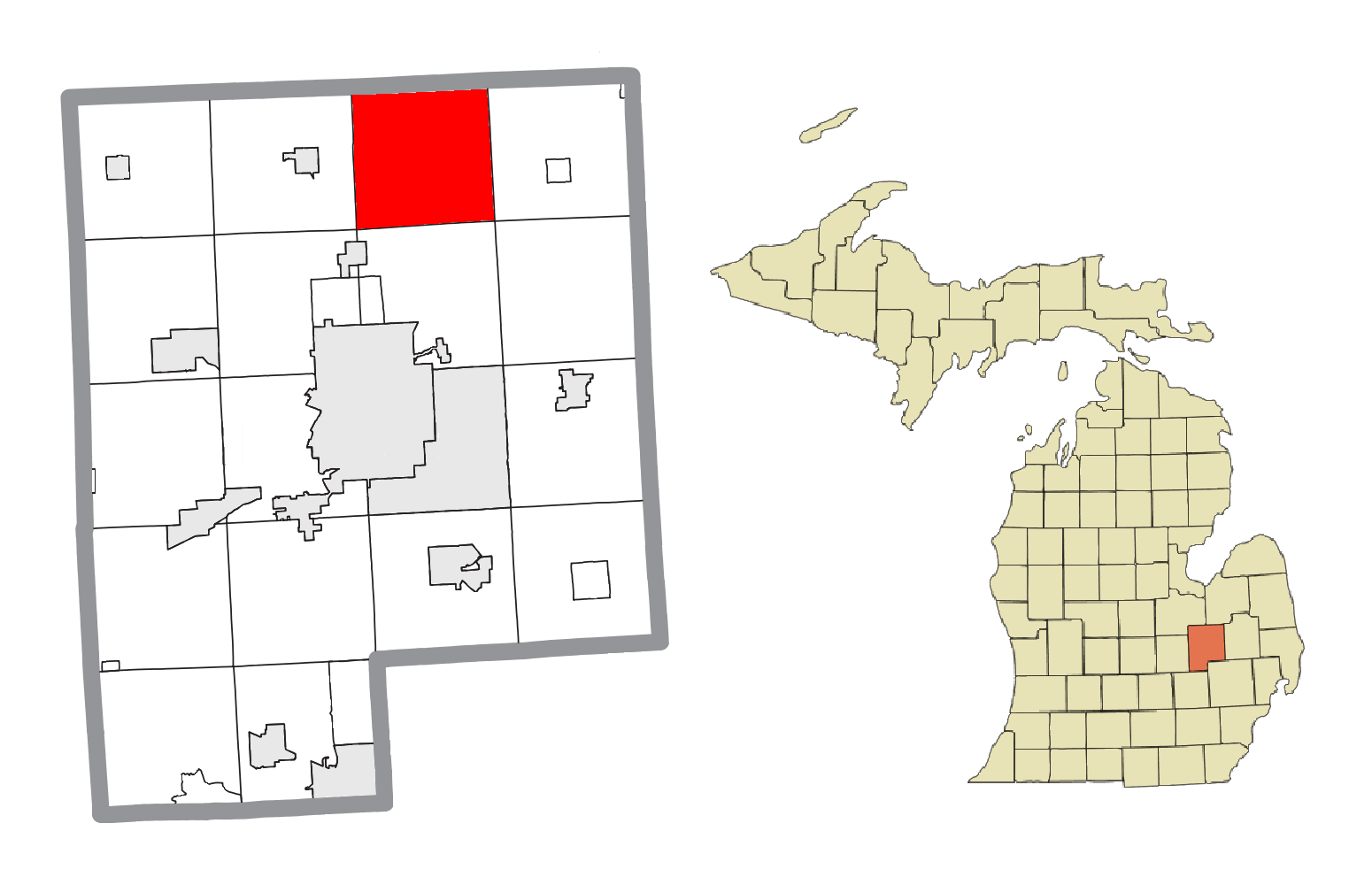
- Location within Genesee County

- Location within the state of Michigan Location within the United States
- Coordinates: 43°09′43″N 83°38′04″W
- Country: United States
- State: Michigan
- County: Genesee
- Settled: 1835
- Established: 1842

Government
  - Supervisor: Rachel Stanke
  - Clerk: Nicole Moore

Area
  - Total: 34.66 sq mi (89.77 km^{2})
  - Land: 34.55 sq mi (89.48 km^{2})
  - Water: 0.10 sq mi (0.26 km^{2})
- Elevation: 781 ft (238 m)

Population (2020)
  - Total: 6,640
  - Density: 192/sq mi (74.2/km^{2})
- Time zone: UTC-5 (EST)
  - Summer (DST): UTC-4 (EDT)
- ZIP code(s): 48420 (Clio); 48458 (Mount Morris); 48463 (Otisville); 48746 (Millington)
- Area code: 810
- FIPS code: 26-79460
- GNIS feature ID: 1627159
- Website: https://thetfordtwpmi.gov/

Thetford Township, is a civil township of Genesee County in the U.S. state of Michigan. The population was 6,640 at the 2020 census, a significant decrease from 7,049 at the 2010 census.

== Communities ==
- Thetford Center is an unincorporated community in the township at Center and Vienna Roads.
- Whitesburg, or Whitesburgh, is an unincorporated community in the township on Vassar Road, north of Scott Road and south of Dodge Road. It formerly had a post office and a railroad station.

== History ==
The township's first post office, Pine Run, opened on January 15, 1836, and changed its name to Thetford in 1844. Later, in 1855, East Thetford post office opened on Vienna Road west of Belsay Road. This was followed by Whitesburgh post office in 1866. After several temporary closures and relocations, the two Thetford post offices closed in 1902, and Rogersville (previously Whitesburgh) closed in 1919.

In 2001, the township established a police department funded through its general budget. The police department survived a 2008 referendum on its closure. A 2017 scandal involving improper storage of surplus equipment from the Defense Logistics Agency eventually led to the indictment of Police Chief Robert Kenny on charges of embezzlement and obstruction of justice, in 2018.

Since late 2017, Thetford and adjacent areas have received water from the Karegnondi Water Authority pipeline with treatment by Genesee County Drain Commission Water and Waste Division.

== Geography ==
According to the U.S. Census Bureau, the township has a total area of 34.66 square miles (89.77 km^{2}), of which 34.55 square miles (89.48 km^{2}) is land and 0.10 square miles (0.26 km^{2}) (0.29%) is water.

== Demographics ==
As of the census of 2000, there were 8,277 people, 2,975 households, and 2,299 families residing in the township. The population density was 238.6 inhabitants per square mile (92.1/km^{2}). There were 3,072 housing units at an average density of 88.6 per square mile (34.2/km^{2}). The racial makeup of the township was 94.42% White, 2.91% African American, 0.69% Native American, 0.24% Asian, 0.51% from other races, and 1.23% from two or more races. Hispanic or Latino of any race were 1.87% of the population.

There were 2,975 households, out of which 37.2% had children under the age of 18 living with them, 61.4% were married couples living together, 11.5% had a female householder with no husband present, and 22.7% were non-families. 18.0% of all households were made up of individuals, and 4.9% had someone living alone who was 65 years of age or older. The average household size was 2.77 and the average family size was 3.12.

In the township the population was spread out, with 26.9% under the age of 18, 9.0% from 18 to 24, 31.4% from 25 to 44, 24.7% from 45 to 64, and 7.9% who were 65 years of age or older. The median age was 36 years. For every 100 females, there were 99.8 males. For every 100 females age 18 and over, there were 97.3 males.

The median income for a household in the township was $47,175, and the median income for a family was $50,378. Males had a median income of $41,533 versus $25,884 for females. The per capita income for the township was $21,057. About 5.8% of families and 7.4% of the population were below the poverty line, including 9.6% of those under age 18 and none of those age 65 or over.

== Education ==
Thetford Township is served by five separate public school districts. The majority of the township is served by Clio Area School District to the west in Clio. Most of the southern portion of the township is served by Mount Morris Consolidated Schools to the southwest in Mount Morris. A very small portion of the southeast corner is served by the Genesee School District, and very small portions of the eastern boundary are served by LakeVille Community Schools in Otisville.
