= Clio Area Schools =

School district in Michigan, United States

Address
- 1 Mustang Dr. Clio, Michigan, Genesee, Michigan, 48420; United States

District information
- Type: Public school district
- Grades: Prekindergarten-12
- Superintendent: Lisa Taylor
- Schools: 6
- Budget: $47,624,000 2022-2023 total expenditures
- NCES District ID: 2610110

Students and staff
- Students: 2,537 (2023-2024)
- Teachers: 119.24 FTE (2023-2024)
- Staff: 318.3 FTE (2023-2024)
- Student–teacher ratio: 21.28

Other information
- Website: www.clioschools.org

Clio Area Schools is a public school district in Genesee County in the U.S. state of Michigan and in the Genesee Intermediate School District. The district includes all of the city of Clio; the majorities of Thetford Township and Vienna Township; and parts of Flushing Township, Montrose Township, and Mount Morris Township.

Clio Schools operates a four-tier configuration for district schools. Grades K–3 are assigned to elementary level, 4 and 5 are assigned to the Intermediate level, 6–8 are assigned to the middle school level, and 9–12 to the high school level.

== History ==
Clio High School, designed by the Flint architectural firm Nurmi, Nelson, McKinley & Associates, opened in the fall of 1965, replacing a building constructed in 1955. Before the 1955 structure, the district's high school dated back to 1928. When the current high school opened, the 1955 building was converted into Carter Junior High, later known as Clio Middle School.

== Schools ==
Schools in Clio Area Schools district
| School | Address | Notes |
|---|---|---|
| Clio High School | 1 Mustang Dr., Clio | Grades 9–12 |
| Clio Community High School | 1 Mustang Dr., Clio | Alternative education program located at the high school |
| Clio Middle School | 300 Rogers Lodge Drive, Clio | Grades 6–8 |
| Clio Intermediate School | 300 Rogers Lodge Drive, Clio | Grades 4–5 |
| Clio Elementary School | 10271 Clio Road, Clio | Grades PreK-3. Formerly Garner Elementary. |
| Clio Early Elementary | 11218 N. Linden Rd., Clio | Grades PreK-KG. Formerly Edgerton Elementary. |

== Athletics ==
Clio Area Schools
- School: Clio High School; Clio Middle School
- Nickname: Mustangs
- Michigan High School Athletic Association: Class "B”
- Conference: Flint Metro League
- Athletic director: Eric Doyle
- Location: Clio, MI
- Football stadium: Pride Stadium
- Colors: Orange and black
- Fight song: "On, Oh Clio"
- Website: www.clioschools.org

Clio was a charter member of the Genesee County B League, formed in 1950. In 1960, Clio, along with seven other schools from around Genesee County left the GCBL to form the Big Eight Conference. The conference would later be renamed the Big Nine Conference in 1968 after the addition of an additional member school.

Clio remained a member of the Big Nine Conference through the end of the 2004–05 school year, when the district applied for and was granted membership into the Flint Metro League for competitive reasons. While in the Big Nine, Clio teams had great success in baseball, wrestling, girls' golf, and girls' basketball.

Though Clio has no recognized Michigan High School Athletic Association team state championships, the school finished as state runner-up for girls' cross-country (1980), and girls' golf (2000–2006). The school has had several individual state champions in boys' wrestling and girls' cross-country.

Recently the boys' cross-country team took second place at the Michigan State Spartan Invitational (2012).

The press box located at the Clio High School's Pride Stadium was renamed in 1991 in honor of long time Clio resident and former Board of Education member Robert Sheppard. Sheppard, who was the public address announcer for the Mustangs for many years, was killed in a collision in Chesaning, MI in 1990.
