= Genesee School District =

Public school district in Michigan

Location
- Michigan 48437; United States
- Coordinates: 43°5′48″N 83°38′45″W

District information
- Superintendent: Dr. Melody Strang

Other information
- Intermediate District: Genesee
- Website: www.geneseeschools.org

Genesee School District is a public school district in Genesee County in the U.S. state of Michigan and in the Genesee Intermediate School District.

== High school ==
Genesee High School

Location
- 7347 N. Genesee Rd. Genesee, MI; United States

Information
- Type: High School
- Motto: "Genesee ~ The Place to Be!"
- Status: Open
- School district: Genesee School District
- Principal: Jay Magro
- Colors: Green and White
- Mascot: Willy the Wolf (?)
- Nickname: Genesee Wolves

== Athletics ==
Genesee School District
- School: Genesee High School
- Conference: Genesee Area Conference
- Division: Blue
- Athletic director: Jack Gallery
- Location: Genesee, MI
- Varsity teams: Junior and High School Sports
- Fight song: Genesee Fight Song
- Colors: Green and White
- Website: www.geneseeschools.org
