= Richfield Public School Academy =

Charter school in Michigan, United States

Coordinates: 43.0491°N 83.6358°W

Information
- Grades: Kindergarten - Grade 8
- Website: www.richfieldpsa.net

Richfield Public School Academy is a free public charter school in Flint, Michigan formerly managed by Mosaica Education and now self-managed by the Richfield Board of Directors. It offers grades 3–8 at the main building and a Montessori pre-school program off-site. Grades K-2 are located at Richfield Early Learning Center on Richfield Road in Flint.
