= Bendle Public Schools =

School district in Michigan

Address
- 3420 Columbine Ave. Burton, Genesee County, Michigan, 48529; United States
- Coordinates: 42°58′40.1″N 83°40′03.2″W

District information
- Grades: Pre-Kindergarten-12
- Superintendent: Trisha Cherveny
- Schools: 4
- Budget: $18,107,000 2022-2023 expenditures
- NCES District ID: 2604740

Students and staff
- Students: 1,001 (2024-2025)
- Teachers: 65.2 (on an FTE basis) (2024-2025)
- Staff: 177.97 FTE (2024-2025)
- Student–teacher ratio: 15.35 (2024-2025)

Other information
- Intermediate District: Genesee
- Website: www.bendleschools.org

Bendle Public Schools is a public school district in Genesee County, Michigan. It serves part of Burton.

== History ==
Bendle Public Schools' original high school was built in 1928. Enrollment in the district doubled by 1929, and several older schools and temporary buildings in the district were used until a new addition began construction that year. The first class graduated in 1931.

On December 9, 2003, a consolidation vote for the three all Burton school districts took place with Atherton and Bentley voters in favor of consolidation and Bendle voters were not in favor.

The current Bendle High School opened in fall 2008. The former high school, dedicated in 1955, then became the district's middle school. The former middle school at 4093 Barnes Avenue, T.L. Lamb Junior High, had been housed in the 1928 building. It closed and was torn down in 2011.

In January 2026, part of the roof of the middle school collapsed in the wrestling room. 6 weeks later, a wall collapsed in the same area where the roof had fallen.

== Schools ==
Schools in Bendle Public Schools district
School	Address	Notes
Bendle High School	2283 E Scottwood Ave, Burton	Grades 9-12
Bendle Middle School	2294 E Bristol Rd, Burton	Grades 6-8
South Bendle Elementary	4341 Larkin, Burton	Grades PreK-2
West Bendle Elementary	4020 Cerdan Ave, Burton	Grades 3-5
Bendle Virtual Academy		Online learning for grades 6-12.
