= Flushing Community Schools =

School district in Michigan

Address
- 522 N. McKinley Road Flushing, Michigan, Genesee, Michigan, 48433; United States
- Coordinates: 43°04′14″N 83°51′08″W

District information
- Type: Public
- Grades: Pre-kindergarten through 12
- Superintendent: Matt Shanafelt
- Schools: 8
- Budget: $57,896,000 2022-2023 total expenditures
- NCES District ID: 2614550

Students and staff
- Students: 4,094 (2024-25)
- Teachers: 224.47 FTE (2024-25)
- Staff: 527.81 FTE (2024-25)
- Student–teacher ratio: 18.24 (2024-25)

Other information
- Website: www.flushingschools.org

Flushing Community Schools is a school district in Genesee County, Michigan. It is a part of the Genesee Intermediate School District and serves the city of Flushing and portions of Flushing Township, Clayton Township, Flint Township, and Mount Morris Township.

== History ==
Flushing Middle School was opened in January 2006. The old Jr. High was built in 1927, and now is used as an early childhood center.

== Schools ==
Flushing Community Schools
School	Address	2023-2024 Enrollment	Grades
Early Childhood Center	409 Chamberlain Street, Flushing	314	PreK-K
Central Elementary School	525 Coutant Street, Flushing	487	1-6
Elms Elementary School	6125 N. Elms Road, Flushing	347	1-6
Seymour Elementary School	3088 N. Seymour Road, Flushing	500	1-6
Springview Elementary School	1233 Springview Street, Flushing	451	1-6
Flushing Middle School	8100 W. Carpenter Road, Flushing	638	7-8
Flushing High School	5039 Deland Road, Flushing	1,248	9-12
