= Lake Fenton Community Schools =

School district in Michigan

Address
- 11425 Torrey Road Fenton, Genesee, Michigan, 48430; United States
- Coordinates: 42°51′35.1″N 83°43′36.6″W

District information
- Grades: Pre-Kindergarten-12
- President: Chris Fletcher
- Superintendent: Chris Belcher
- Schools: 4
- Budget: $31,078,000 2022-2023 expenditures
- NCES District ID: 2620670

Students and staff
- Students: 2,003 (2023-2024)
- Teachers: 119.51 (on an FTE basis) (2023-2024)
- Staff: 261.32 FTE (2023-2024)
- Student–teacher ratio: 16.76 (2023-2024)

Other information
- Intermediate District: Genesee
- Website: www.lakefentonschools.org

Lake Fenton Community Schools is a public school district in Genesee County, Michigan. It serves Lake Fenton and parts of Fenton, Fenton Township, Grand Blanc Township, and Mundy Township.

== History ==
The district originally began as a collection of six one-room schoolhouses that consolidated in two waves. O'Dell Schoolhouse was designated as School District No. 1 and was located at the corner of Baldwin and Torrey roads in Fenton Township on land owned by Lafayette O'Dell and later donated by his descendant William O'Dell. The school was started in 1837, and was the first record school in the county. The first schoolhouse was built in 1845. At annexation, the school was the oldest district still in continuous operation.

The first wave of consolidation was in 1922, and consisted of Severance, Long Lake and Sand Bar schools joined together. In 1953–54, the school district added the O'Dell, South Mundy and Kennedy one-room schools.

Consolidation began in 1922 and, in 1956, the Lake Fenton Community School (essentially West Shore Elementary and Torrey Hill Middle School) was built to replace the one-room schools. The school itself sat on the site of one of the one-room schools, the former Long Lake School. Then, in 1959, the first Lake Fenton High School was built, being added onto the Community School. In time, West Shore and Torrey Hill moved to a new building on Lahring Road, and the high school occupied the 1956 school building. Today, Torrey Hill is an intermediate school and the original high school a middle school. The current high school opened in fall 2004.

== Schools ==
Schools in Lake Fenton Community Schools district
School	Address	Notes
Lake Fenton High School	4070 Lahring Road, Linden	Grades 9-12
Lake Fenton Middle School	11425 Torrey Road, Fenton	Grades 6-8
Torrey Hill Intermediate School	12410 Torrey Road, Fenton	Grades 3-5
West Shore Elementary	3076 Lahring Road, Fenton	Grades K-2
Lake Fenton Early Learning Center	11425 Torrey Rd., Fenton	Preschool. Shares a building with Lake Fenton Middle School.

== Athletics ==
The Lake Fenton Blue Devils play in the Flint Metro League and compete in many sports including Basketball, Cheer (Competitive & Sideline), Football, Cross Country, Track, and, after adding Gymnastics and Lacrosse in 2015, Fenton offered opportunities for every Michigan High School Athletics Association (MHSAA) tournament sport.

Historically, the Lake Fenton Blue Devils were a long-standing member of the Genesee County Independent League (GAC) Red Division, where they maintained intense local rivalries before officially transitioning to the Flint Metro League (FML) Stars Division in the fall of 2019 to accommodate district growth. The school's athletic programs compete under the governance of the Michigan High School Athletic Association (MHSAA) in Division 2 and Division 3 postseason tournaments depending on the sport. The Blue Devils have achieved notable statewide success in wrestling, securing multiple MHSAA state championship titles and consistently appearing in the individual and team state finals. Additionally, the varsity football program has secured multiple regional titles and MHSAA playoff berths since the opening of the new high school facility, supported by upgraded athletic infrastructure including the artificial turf stadium layout at the Lahring Road campus.

== Student Enrollment and Teachers ==
=== Student Enrollment ===
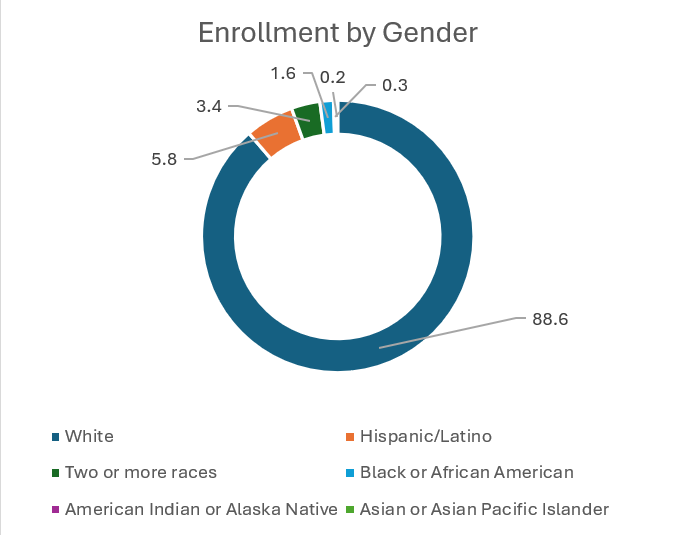
Student Enrollment Percentage chart (information provided by government)

The percentage of students studying at Lake Fenton Community Schools consists of 88.6% white, 1.6% Black, 0.2% Asian or Asian/Pacific Islander, 5.8% Hispanic/Latino, 0.3% American Indian or Alaska Native, and 0% Native Hawaiian or other Pacific Islander. In addition, 3.4% of students are two or more races, and 0% have not specified their race or ethnicity.

Student Enrollment by gender
Males	50%
Females	50%

=== Teachers ===
Within Lake Fenton Community Schools, 100.0% of teachers are licensed. The student-to-teacher ratio is higher than the state average, at 17:1. The district has 1 full-time counselor on staff.
