= Linden Community Schools =

School district in Michigan

Address
- 7205 Silver Lake Road Linden, Genesee, Michigan, 48451; United States
- Coordinates: 42°48′38.0″N 83°48′50.2″W

District information
- Grades: Pre-Kindergarten-12
- Superintendent: Russ Ciesielski
- Schools: 5
- Budget: $48,892,000 2022-2023 expenditures
- NCES District ID: 2621690

Students and staff
- Students: 2,350 (2024-20245)
- Teachers: 133.44 (on an FTE basis) (2024-2025)
- Staff: 332.4 FTE (2024-2025)
- Student–teacher ratio: 17.61 (2024-2025)

Other information
- Website: www.lindenschools.org

Linden Community Schools is a public school district in Genesee County, Michigan. It serves Linden, Argentine, and parts of the townships of Argentine, Fenton, Gaines, and Mundy. It also serves parts of Deerfield Township and Tyrone Township in Livingston County.

== History ==
A 2-story brick school was built in Linden in 1870 at 202 S. Bridge Street. An addition was built in 1901. In 1930, a large addition was built that modernized the school. It served as the district's high school into the 1950s and became the district's administration building in the 1970s. It was torn down in 2002.

In fall 1963, a new high school opened at 325 Stan Eaton Drive. The architecture firm was MacKenzie, Knuth and Klein.

The current Linden High School was built around 1977. The previous high school became the middle school.

When Linden Middle School opened in January 2006, the previous middle school became Hyatt Elementary.

== Schools ==
Schools in Linden Community Schools district
School	Address	Notes
Linden High School	7201 Silver Lake Road, Linden	Grades 9-12.
Linden Middle School	15425 Lobdell Road, Linden	Grades 6-8.
Central Elementary	7199 Silver Lake Road, Linden	Grades 4-5.
Hyatt Elementary	325 Stan Eaton Drive, Linden	Grades K-3.
Linden Elementary	400 S. Bridge Street, Linden	Grades K-3.
LCS Early Childhood Center	235 Stan Eaton Dr. Suite A, Linden	Preschool. Shares a building with Hyatt Elementary.

== Athletics ==
Linden Community Schools
- School: Linden High School
- Conference: Flint Metro League
- Athletic director: Pete Gleason
- Football stadium: Claude M Cranston
- Colors: Red, Black, and White
- Fight song: "Onward Linden Onward Linden out to win this game... We will stand beside you Linden on your way to fame. Ra! Ra! Ra! Onward Linden Onward Linden if you do not win... We will stand behind you Linden GO! FIGHT! WIN!
- Website: www.lindenschools.org/o/athletics

In 2008, the Linden Eagles Cross Country team won the MHSAA DIV II Cross Country meet, becoming the first sports team to win a state championship in the school's history.
