= Carman-Ainsworth Community Schools =

School district in Michigan

Address
- G3475 W Court Street Flint, Genesee County, Michigan, 48532; United States
- Coordinates: 42°57′43″N 83°49′35″W

District information
- Type: Public School District
- Grades: Pre-K though 12
- Established: 1837; 189 years ago
- President: Gloria Nealy
- Superintendent: Gina Ryan
- Budget: $64,852,000 (2022-23) expenditures
- NCES District ID: 2607890

Students and staff
- Students: 3,500 (2024-25)
- Teachers: 186.7 (on an FTE basis) (2024-25)
- Staff: 418.64 FTE (2024-25)
- Student–teacher ratio: 18.75 (2024-2025)

Other information
- Intermediate District: Genesee
- Website: www.carman.k12.mi.us

Carman-Ainsworth Community Schools is a public school district in Genesee County, Michigan. It serves parts of Flint, Burton, Flint Township, and Mundy Township.

== History ==
School District #8 was formed in 1837. With the donation of a section of Elijah Carman's farm land, which is now the corner of Bristol and Fenton Roads, in 1847 the district was renamed as the Carman School District.

A dedication ceremony for the Robert N. Mandeville High School was held December 2, 1949 and was named after one of 16 students of the district's 1936 class who died in combat serving in the Air Force during World War II.

In 1949 the Graham School District consolidated with the Dye School District. The consolidated Dye Schools built two elementary school, Dye in 1956 and Randels in 1961.

In the 1950s, the Rankin School District was dissolved and parceled out to Carman, Lake Fenton, Grand Blanc, and Swartz Creek districts. The Hoover School District opened Lena Stalker Elementary School in 1956, while the Utley School District built Woodland Elementary School in 1957.

The district built four elementary schools in 1955: Carman Park Elementary, Fenton Lawn Elementary, Rankin Elementary and Van Slyke Elementary.

In 1961, Dye, Utley and Hoover districts merged into the Carman School District, quadrupling its student population. Mandleville building became a junior high school that year, while the Ainsworth High School was built and opened that fall, overcrowded. It was named for Donnelson and Wayne Ainsworth, a father and son who served a total of 60 years on the Carman school board.

The Gladys Hawkins Dillon Elementary School was constructed in 1962. Planning for a second high school began right away for the district's north end and in 1967 that school, Carman High School, was opened. The district peaked its enrollment in 1970 with nearly 10,000 K-12 students.

=== Carman-Ainsworth Community Schools ===
The Carman School District was renamed in 1986 to Carman-Ainsworth Community Schools to indicate the community approach and the dual K-12 zones covered by the high schools. The student population slid due to the withdrawal of the automotive industry to near 5,000 students in the mid-1980s. As a result, three middle schools were closed and sold. Ainsworth High School became the middle school as Carman-Ainsworth Middle School and Carman High School was renamed Carman-Ainsworth High School.

In 2007, Carman Park Elementary was shut down with its four and fifth grade students moved to Rankin. Also, in September of that year an alternative career focused high school, Carman Park-Baker Career Academy, was opened together with Bendle Public Schools and Baker College in a renovated Carman Park school building.

In 2012, Woodland Elementary was shut down with its students moved to either Dillon or Rankin depending on their grade level. In the 2012–2013 school year, Atlantis Alternative High school moved to the Woodland Elementary building. Atlantis is a Carman-Ainsworth/Bendle Public Schools program.

Launched from the "Carman Talk" Facebook group, a series of fundraisers were held in September 2014 to launch Carman Cougar Education Foundation to provide a scholarship and assisting "economically disadvantaged children".

== Schools ==
Schools in Carman-Ainsworth Community Schools district
School	Address	Notes
Carman-Ainsworth High	1300 N. Linden Road, Flint	Grades 9-12. Built 1967.
Carman-Ainsworth Middle	1409 W. Maple Avenue, Flint	Grades 6-8
Dillon Elementary	1197 Schumacher Avenue, Burton	Grades K-5
Dye Elementary	1174 South Graham Road, Flint	Grades K-5
Randels Elementary	6022 Brobeck Street, Flint	Grades K-5
Rankin Elementary	G-3459 Mundy Avenue, Schwartz Creek	Grades K-5
Atlantis Alternative High School	1409 W. Maple Ave., Flint	Alternative high school, grades 9-12. Formerly Woodland Elementary
TLC Early Childhood Center	1181 W. Scottwood Avenue, Flint	Preschool and early childhood programs
