= Flint Township, Michigan =

- Charter township
- Charter Township of Flint
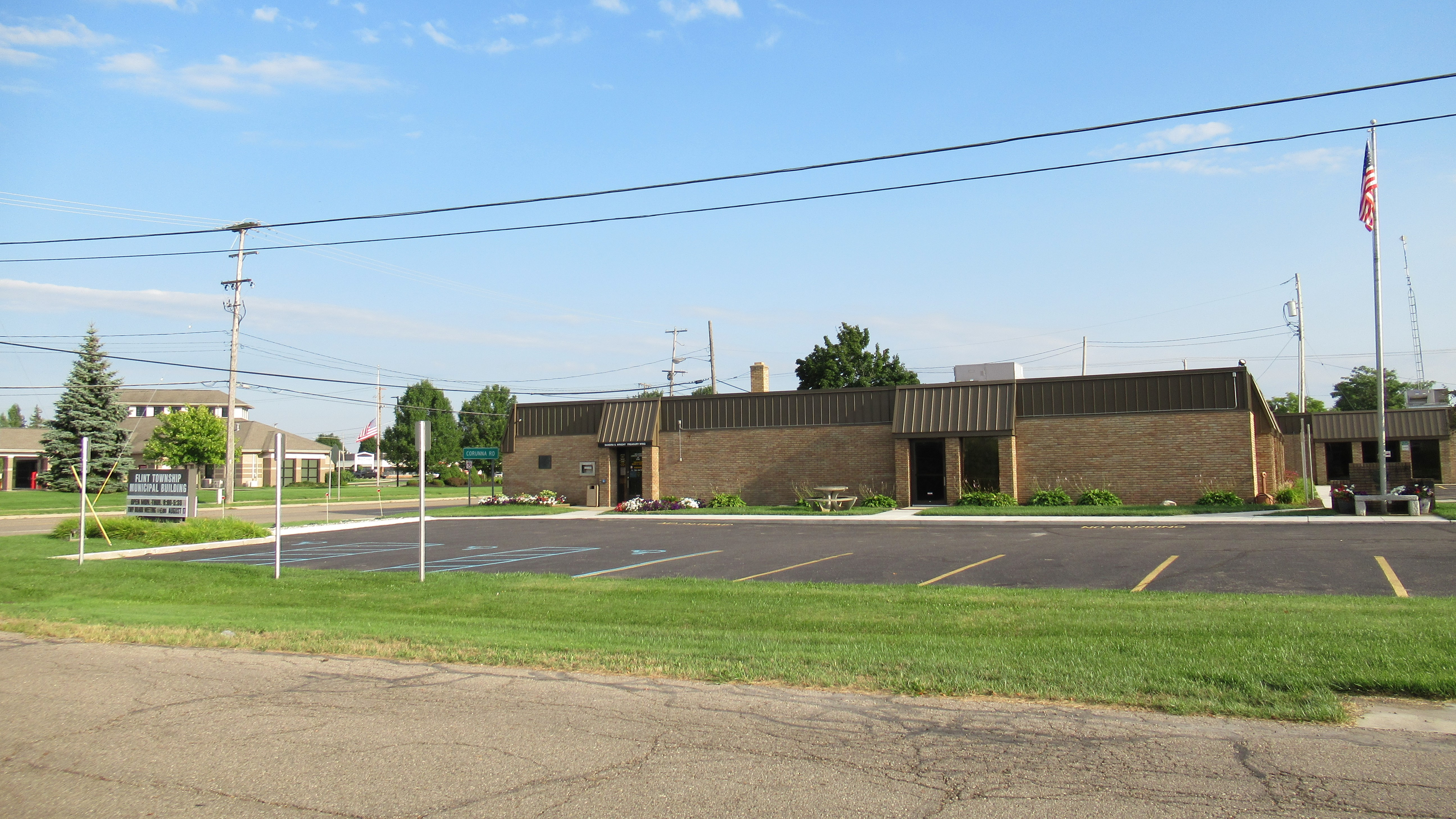
- Flint Township Municipal Building
- Motto: "An ideal place to work. A great place to live"
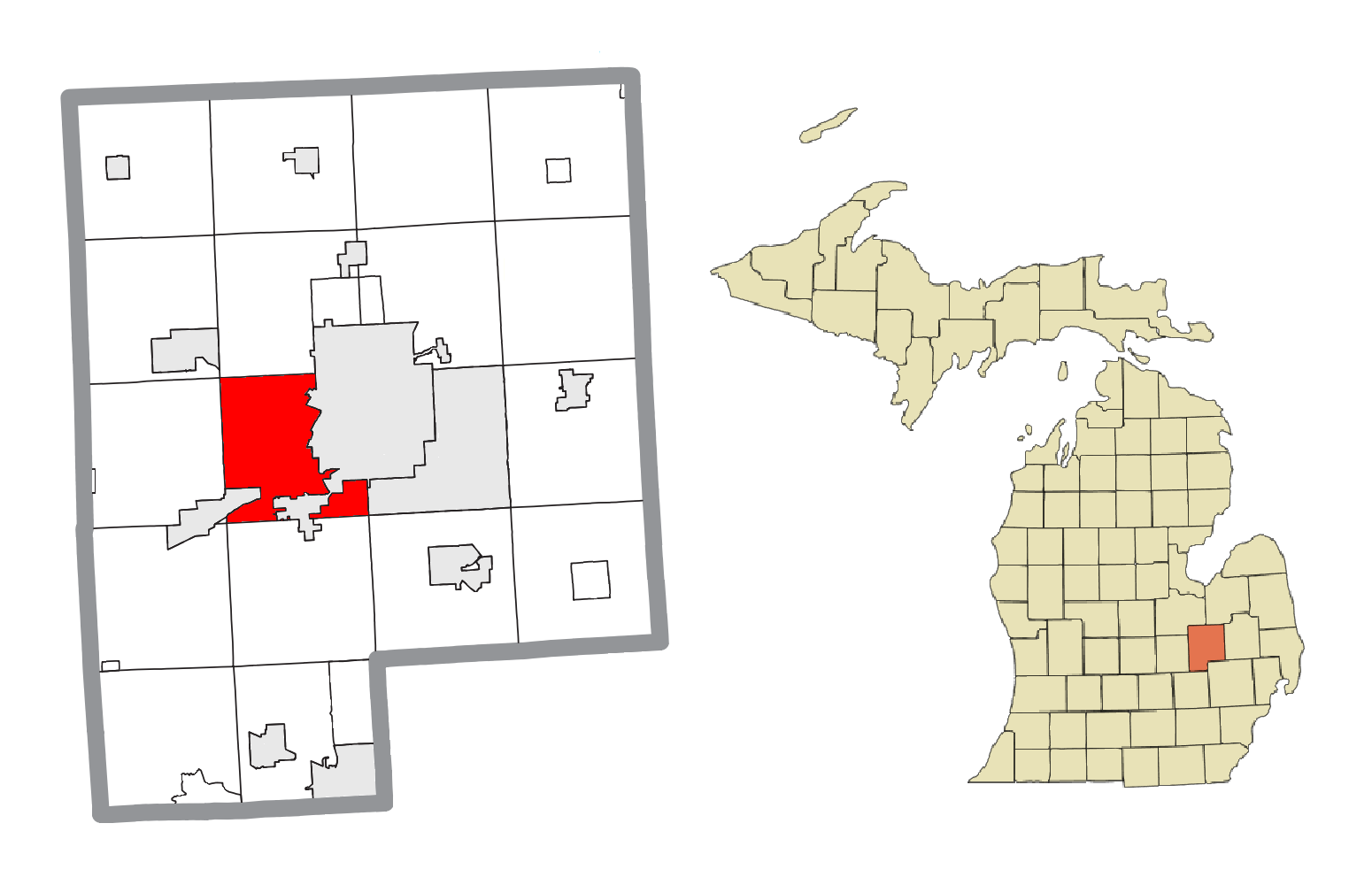
- Location within Genesee County

- Location within the state of Michigan
- Coordinates: 42°59′54″N 83°45′17″W
- Country: United States
- State: Michigan
- County: Genesee
- Settled: 1835
- Organized: 1836

Government
  - Supervisor: Karyn Miller
  - Clerk: Manya Triplett

Area
  - Total: 23.6 sq mi (61.2 km^{2})
  - Land: 23.6 sq mi (61.2 km^{2})
  - Water: 0 sq mi (0.0 km^{2})
- Elevation: 791 ft (241 m)

Population (2020)
  - Total: 31,447
  - Density: 1,330/sq mi (514/km^{2})
- Time zone: UTC-5 (EST)
  - Summer (DST): UTC-4 (EDT)
- ZIP code(s): 48433 (Flushing); 48473 (Swartz Creek); 48503, 48504, 48507, 48532, 48551, 48553 (Flint)
- Area code: 810
- FIPS code: 26-29020
- GNIS feature ID: 1626286
- Website: www.flinttownship.org

The Charter Township of Flint, also known as Flint Township, is a charter township of Genesee County in the U.S. state of Michigan. The population was 31,447 at the 2020 census. The City of Flint is adjacent to the township, but the two are administered autonomously.

== Background ==
Wayne County was formed within the Northwest Territory covering the Lower Peninsula. The Saginaw Valley Treaty was signed with the Chippewa Indians in 1819. In 1836, the Pewanigo tribe of the Saginaw Indians sign a treaty with the US government that gave all remaining land in Genesee County for 13 sections of land west of the Mississippi River with the land to be sold for the Indians' benefits.

For additional information, see Genesee County, Michigan and Michigan.

On March 9, 1833, the Township of Grand Blanc was organized which then included Flint Township survey area and many of the other survey township areas of the future Genesee County. The first permanent settlers in the area were Elijah Carmen and his family, who arrived in 1835.

== History ==
Flint Township was organized on March 2, 1836, and included the township areas of Burton, Clayton, Flushing, Mt. Morris, Genesee, Thetford, Vienna and Montrose. Jesse Torrey and his family, the second settlers, move to section 24 starting the Torrey Settlement in 1836. That same year, William N. Stanard founded the Stanard Settlement on section 35.

settlement	section	founder	year
Torrey	24	Jesse Torrey	1836
Dye	20	Reuben Dye	1843
Ultey			
Cronk	7, 8	James W. Cronk	1837
Stanard	35	William N. Stanard	1836
Carter			
Crocker			

On March 11, 1837, Vienna Township was organized to include the future townships of Montrose and Thetford. James W. Cronk in 1837 settled on sections 7 and 8 lending his name to the settlement there.

Genesee and Flushing Townships where split off on March 6, 1838. In 1838 the first schoolhouse was built in Flint Township in Section 23 on the bank of Swartz Creek. As many as ten school districts were created. within the township,

On April 19, 1839, Kearsley Township was split off from Flint Township until March 7, 1843, when it was merged back into Flint Township. The Crockersville post office under its name sake postmaster George Crocker on August 21, 1843.

In 1855, Burton Township on October 12 separated from the Township and the City of Flint was incorporated, thus splitting its area from the Township. The Township was then temporarily known as Garland Township after Burton was split off on October 12, 1855, to February 5, 1856.

The unincorporated village of Otterburn was given a station on the Grand Trunk Railroad in 1882 then a Post Office on August 27, 1887. On January 9, 1862, the Crockersville post office was closed down.

In 1950s, GM executive started a "New Flint" regional/metropolitan government plan to incorporate the metropolitan area into Flint. In 1953, the Township began incorporation discussions as the City of Westhaven, but that possibility was later defeated. The metro government proposal was released in 1957 and petition began circulating the next year. Township supervisor John R. Dickenson condemn the plan.

Area residents were fearful that the New Flint would take the Otterburn plant into its borders. While New Flint proponents indicated that would not be the case, Swartz Creek area residents campaigned against New Flint while moving to incorporate the area. The Township lost the Otterburn area to the City of Swartz Creek upon its incorporation in 1959.

After the City of Flint annexed the GM Van Slyke plant and the city's Bishop Airport in the 1970s, the Township put on the ballot an incorporation question that would have made it the City of Grandview Heights. Another item on the ballot was the election of a mayor for the new city. The incorporation question failed, while the then Township Supervisor Tom Mansour won the mayoral election. In August 1970, Genesee Valley Center opened at Miller and Linden Roads.

== Geography ==
According to the United States Census Bureau, the township has a total area of 23.6 square miles (61 km^{2}), all land. The Township is mostly an L-shape around the southwest side of the City of Flint and split in two along I-69/I-75 interchange south along Bishop Airport to Mundy Township.

== Demographics ==
Historical population
Census	Pop.	Note	%±
1960	19,178		—
1970	31,175		62.6%
1980	35,405		13.6%
1990	34,081		−3.7%
2000	33,691		−1.1%
2010	31,929		−5.2%
2020	31,447		−1.5%
Source: Census Bureau. Census 1960- 2000, 2010.

As of the census of 2000, there were 33,691 people, 13,972 households, and 9,025 families residing in the township. The population density was 1,425.5 inhabitants per square mile (550.4/km^{2}). There were 14,864 housing units at an average density of 628.9 per square mile (242.8/km^{2}). The racial makeup of the township was 77.77% White, 16.12% African American, 0.61% Native American, 2.20% Asian, 0.02% Pacific Islander, 0.75% from other races, and 2.55% from two or more races. Hispanic or Latino of any race were 2.33% of the population.

There were 13,972 households, out of which 30.4% had children under the age of 18 living with them, 45.5% were married couples living together, 14.9% had a female householder with no husband present, and 35.4% were non-families. 30.5% of all households were made up of individuals, and 12.6% had someone living alone who was 65 years of age or older. The average household size was 2.36 and the average family size was 2.94.

In the township the population was spread out, with 24.4% under the age of 18, 8.6% from 18 to 24, 28.0% from 25 to 44, 22.9% from 45 to 64, and 16.1% who were 65 years of age or older. The median age was 38 years. For every 100 females, there were 87.5 males. For every 100 females age 18 and over, there were 82.2 males.

The median income for a household in the township was $39,718, and the median income for a family was $48,763. Males had a median income of $41,449 versus $26,933 for females. The per capita income for the township was $22,216. About 7.8% of families and 10.4% of the population were below the poverty line, including 15.4% of those under age 18 and 6.5% of those age 65 or over.

== Government ==
The governmental unit responsible for most K-12 education in the township is Carman-Ainsworth Community Schools, with Swartz Creek Community Schools and Flushing Community Schools serving parts of the township.

District	Number	Officeholders
U.S. Representative	8th	Kristen McDonald Rivet
State Senate	27th	John Daniel Cherry
State Representative	69th	Jasper Martus
State Representative	70th	Cynthia Neeley
State Representative	71st	Brian BeGole
County Commissioner	2nd (17th Precinct)	Charles H. Winfrey
County Commissioner	4th (12–15, 18, 19 Precincts)	Beverly Brown
County Commissioner	8th	Dale K. Weighill
School District	Carman-Ainsworth	Multiple: see articles
School District	Flushing	Multiple: see articles
School District	Swartz Creek	Multiple: see articles
Community College	C.S. Mott	Multiple; see article

== Infrastructure ==
=== Transportation ===
Bishop International Airport is adjacent to and occupies a portion of Flint Township. The township is served by the Mass Transportation Authority bus lines. In addition, three major highways—I-75, I-69 and US 23—which run through the township intersect one mile (1.6 km) from Bishop Airport. Also, three major rail lines—Canadian National Railway, Lake State Railway, and Huron and Eastern Railway—intersect at the township's northern border.

== Notable person ==
- Dan Kildee, U.S. representative
