= Kearsley Community Schools =

School district in Michigan

Address
- 4398 Underhill Drive Flint, Genesee County, Michigan, 48506; United States

District information
- Motto: Where pride, tradition, and excellence meet.
- Grades: PreKindergarten–12
- President: Chad Langworthy
- Vice-president: Dr. Charles Wade
- Superintendent: Paul Guadard
- Schools: 7
- Budget: $47,274,000 2022–2023 expenditures
- NCES District ID: 2620070

Students and staff
- Students: 2,834 (2024–2025)
- Teachers: 172.75 (on an FTE basis) (2024–2025)
- Staff: 453.66 FTE (2024–2025)
- Student–teacher ratio: 16.41 (2024–2025)
- District mascot: Hornets
- Colors: Blue; Gold

Other information
- Intermediate District: Genesee
- Website: www.kearsleyschools.org

Kearsley Community Schools is a public school district in Genesee County, Michigan. It serves parts of Flint, Burton, Beecher, and parts of the townships of Davison, Genesee and Richfield.

== History ==
Kearsley Community Schools is named after former mayor of Detroit and U.S. Army Major Jonathan Kearsley. The first school was built before the Civil War, but it burned down in 1929. The school was rebuilt later that year.

In 1940, the districts of Kearsley, Tanner, Wentworth and White consolidated to form the current district. Groundbreaking for the current high school was on June 28, 1956. In 2022, voters passed a $21.65 million bond issue to improve school facilities.

== Schools ==
Schools in Kearsley Community Schools district
School	Address	Notes
Kearsley High School	4302 Underhill Drive, Flint	Grades 7–12. Built 1957.
Armstrong Middle School	6161 Hopkins, Flint	Grades 6-8. Built 1972.
Kate Dowdall Elementary	3333 Shillelagh Drive, Flint	Grades 2-3. Built 1960.
Leota Fiedler Elementary	6317 Nightingale Drive, Flint	Grades 4-5. Built 1964.
Weston Elementary	2499 Cashin Street, Burton	Grades K-1. Built 1952.
Pumpkin Patch Early Childhood Center	4235 Crosby Road, Flint	Preschool. Formerly Thelma Buffey Elementary. Built 1962.
Kearsley Virtual Academy	4396 Underhill Drive, Flint	Online school for grades 9-12.
