= Genesee County, Michigan =

County in Michigan, United States

- County
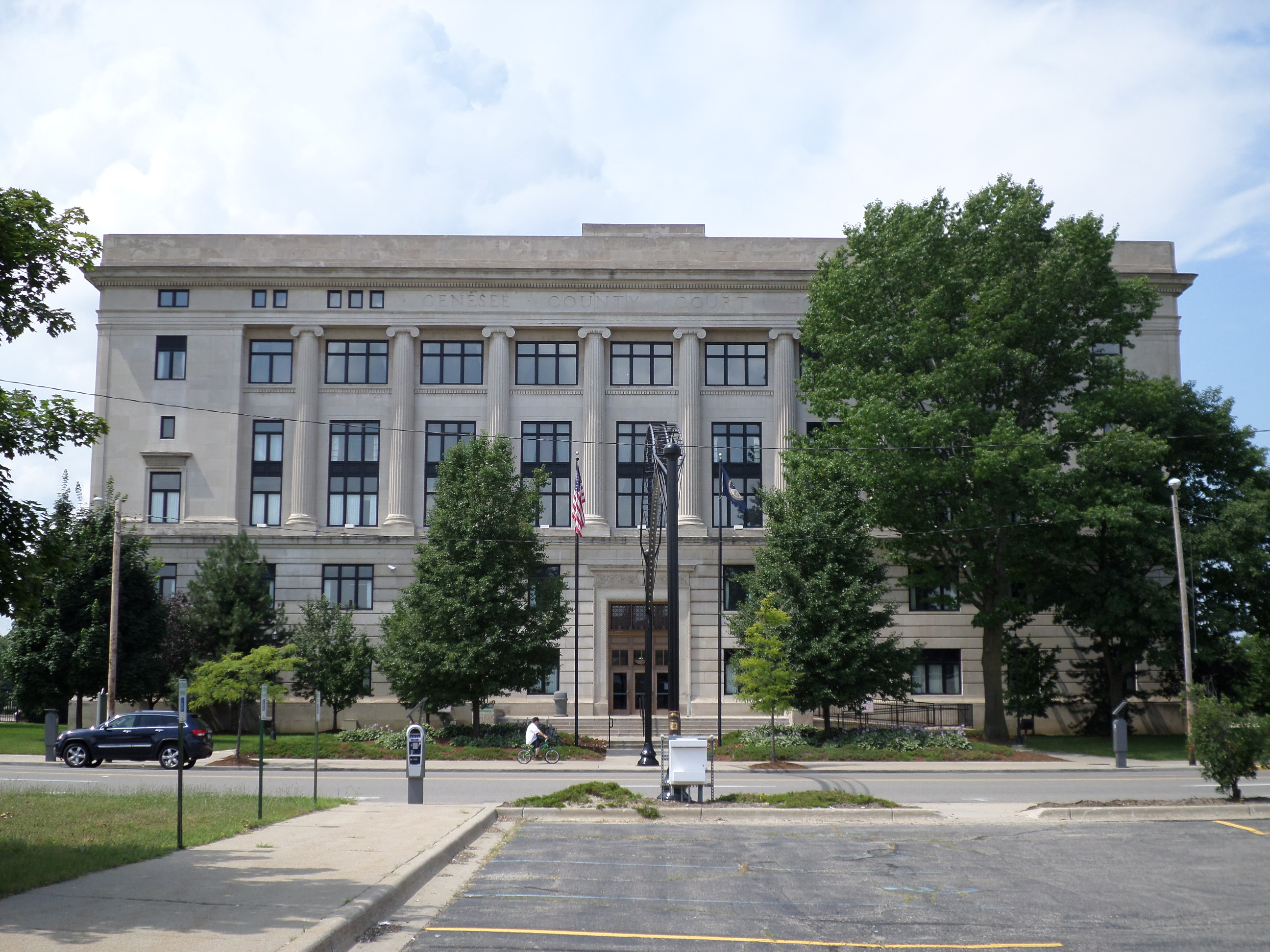
- The Genesee County Courthouse in Flint

- Logo

- Location within the U.S. state of Michigan
- Coordinates: 43.021077°N 83.706372°W
- Country: United States
- State: Michigan
- Founded: March 28, 1835 (created); April 4, 1836 (organized)
- Named for: Genesee County, New York
- Seat: Flint
- Largest city: Flint

Area
  - Total: 649.587 sq mi (1,682.42 km^{2})
  - Land: 636.944 sq mi (1,649.68 km^{2})
  - Water: 12.643 sq mi (32.75 km^{2}) 1.95%

Population (2020)
  - Total: 406,211
  - Estimate (2025): 401,093 ▼
  - Density: 631.698/sq mi (243.900/km^{2})
- Time zone: UTC−5 (Eastern)
  - Summer (DST): UTC−4 (EDT)
- Area code: 810
- Congressional districts: 7th, 8th
- Website: geneseecountymi.gov

Genesee County (/ˈdʒɛnəsi/ JEN-ə-see) is a county in the U.S. state of Michigan. As of the 2020 Census, its population was 406,211, and was estimated to be 401,093 in 2025, making it the fifth-most populous county in Michigan, and the most populous in Mid-Michigan. The county seat and largest city is Flint (birthplace of General Motors). Genesee County consists of 33 cities, townships, and villages. It is considered to be a part of Mid-Michigan.

The county was named after Genesee County, New York, which in turn comes from the Seneca word Gen-nis'-hee-yo, meaning "Beautiful Valley". Genesee County comprises the Flint, MI Metropolitan statistical area. A major attraction for visitors is Crossroads Village, a living-history village north of Flint.

Genesee County is noted for having had an 11,000-year-old fossil of a whale (Balaenoptera) unearthed during quarry work in Thetford Township.

== History ==
=== Formative period ===
Genesee County was created on March 28, 1835, from territory taken from Lapeer, Shiawassee, and Saginaw Counties. The county was attached to Oakland County for judicial purposes. The only township organized at the time was Grand Blanc, formed in 1833, consisting of additional township areas of the present Fenton, Mundy, Flint, Mount Morris, Genesee, Burton, Atlas, and Davison Townships. (Atlas and Davison Township survey areas were then in Lapeer County.) Flint Township followed in formation by the legislature on March 2, 1836, splitting away from Grand Blanc with the township areas of Burton, Genesee, and Mount Morris, plus additional township areas of the present-day Clayton, Montrose, Flushing, Thetford, and Vienna. On April 4, 1836, the county was fully organized. Organized on July 26, 1836, Argentine Township included two township survey areas, taking Fenton away from Grand Blanc Township plus the current Argentine area west of Fenton.

In the organizing act of March 11, 1837, two townships (Mundy and Vienna) were organized in the county. Mundy had an additional township area to the west. Vienna consisted of the northern tier of three township areas in the county at the time taking two areas from Flint Township. With this act just a week after Michigan's admission as a state, the county was fully covered with five township governments.

The townships of Genesee, Fenton, and Flushing were formed on March 6, 1838. Genesee and Flushing were split off from Flint Township. Fenton was split off from Argentine Township. Genesee included half the survey area to the west. While Flushing included the other half of that survey area (township 8 North range 6 East), the full township area further west (township 8 North range 5 East) then another survey area and half the row below (township 7 North range 5,6 East). Thus, Flint Township consisted of one and a half township survey areas.

Fifteen northerly sections of survey area township 7 north range No. 7 east in Flint Township plus southerly sections of Genesee Township were set off by the Michigan Legislature as Kearsley Township in 1839. On March 7, 1843, the legislature abolished this township returning the sections back to Flint and Genesee townships. Thus Flint Township consisted of approximately one and a half township survey areas.

Two new townships were formed by the state on March 9, 1842. Thetford was the eastmost survey area split off from Vienna. While Gaines was formed with the western township survey of Mundy.

The county was enlarged on March 9, 1843, by adding a column of townships on its east from Lapeer County. From north to south, the townships were Forest, Richfield, Davison and Atlas.

On March 25, 1846, an additional two townships were formed, Clayton, and Pewanagawink. Clayton split the southernmost survey area from Flushing Township. Pewanagawink took the westernmost survey area from Vienna and changed its name to Montrose by act of January 15, 1848.

Mount Morris Township was created on February 12, 1855, from a single survey township area with its two halves taken from Flushing and Genesee townships. Flint Township was split into three parts upon the formation of the City of Flint. The county board of supervisors split the remaining township survey area into two; the western area became Garland Township (this name only lasted until the Flint name was restored on February 5, 1856) and the remaining eastern survey area became Burton Township.

=== Modern era ===
Plans for the Genesee Recreation Area were placed in Flint's master plan in 1950. This was presented to Charles Stewart Mott Foundation board of trustees in 1964, with Charles Stewart Mott favoring the plan. In 1968, the county park system was started with the purchase of vacant land. with funds from the Mott Foundation, with a stipulation that a parks commission be formed.

Flint Community Junior College was turned into a county-wide institution with a referendum and millage proposal passing the voters in 1969. To reflect this, the college was renamed Genesee Community College on July 5, 1970. In 1973, it was renamed as Charles Stewart Mott Community College after the death of C.S. Mott.

In October 2009, county commissioners directed county corporate counsel to discuss with the county prosecuting attorney a possible merger of his office with the county prosecuting attorney's office. As of December 2011, County Counsel Ward Chapman was intending to retire by the end of the year, again raising the possibility of a merger. By August 9, 2016, the two offices were merged.

The Emergency Management and Homeland Security Department was merged by the county commission into the Sheriff's Department in June 2010, with the department director position being demoted to a manager level post and eliminating a programming coordinator. In July 2010, the county board voted to merge the clerk and register of deeds offices, effective January 1, 2013.

On October 26, 2010, Genesee County became a founding member of the Karegnondi Water Authority with Board of Commissioners Chair Jamie W. Curtis representing the county on the authority's board.

On May 30, 2012, Genesee County was reported to have had 45 confirmed tornadoes since 1950 (most notably the 1953 Flint–Beecher tornado), more than any other county in Michigan in that time.

== Geography ==
According to the United States Census Bureau, the county has a total area of 649.587 square miles (1,682.42 km^{2}), of which 12.643 sq mi (32.75 km^{2}) (1.95%) are covered by water. It is the 33rd-largest county in Michigan by total area.

The county is mostly drained by the Flint River, which is dammed into Mott Lake and the Holloway Reservoir in the northeast corner of the county. The southeast corner and southern end are drained by the Shiawassee River.

=== Adjacent counties ===
- Tuscola County (northeast)
- Lapeer County (east)
- Oakland County (southeast)
- Livingston County (southwest)
- Shiawassee County (west)
- Saginaw County (northwest)

== Transportation ==
- Bishop International Airport is served by several major airlines.
- The intermodal Flint Amtrak station offers daily service on the Blue Water route west to Chicago and east to Port Huron. It doubles as a bus station for Greyhound Lines, Indian Trails, and Flint Mass Transportation Authority.

=== Major highways ===
- I-75 - runs north and south through central Genesee County, merges with US 23 in Mundy Township
- I-69 - runs east and west through central Genesee County
- I-475 - alternate route of I-75/US23, runs north and south through central Genesee County
- US 23 - runs north and south through central Genesee County, merges with I-75 in Mundy Township
- M-13 - runs north and south through western Genesee County, north of I-69, along the borders with Shiawassee County and Saginaw County
- M-15 - runs north and south through eastern Genesee County
- M-21 - runs east and west through central Genesee County, west of I-475
- M-54 - runs north and south through central Genesee County
- M-57 - runs east and west through northern Genesee County, west of M-15

== Demographics ==
Historical population
Census	Pop.	Note	%±
1840	4,268		—
1850	12,031		181.9%
1860	22,498		87.0%
1870	33,900		50.7%
1880	39,220		15.7%
1890	39,430		0.5%
1900	41,804		6.0%
1910	64,555		54.4%
1920	125,668		94.7%
1930	211,641		68.4%
1940	227,944		7.7%
1950	270,963		18.9%
1960	374,313		38.1%
1970	444,341		18.7%
1980	450,449		1.4%
1990	430,459		−4.4%
2000	436,141		1.3%
2010	425,790		−2.4%
2020	406,211		−4.6%
2025 (est.)	401,093	▼	−1.3%
U.S. Decennial Census; 1790–1960 1900–1990; 1990–2000 2010–2020

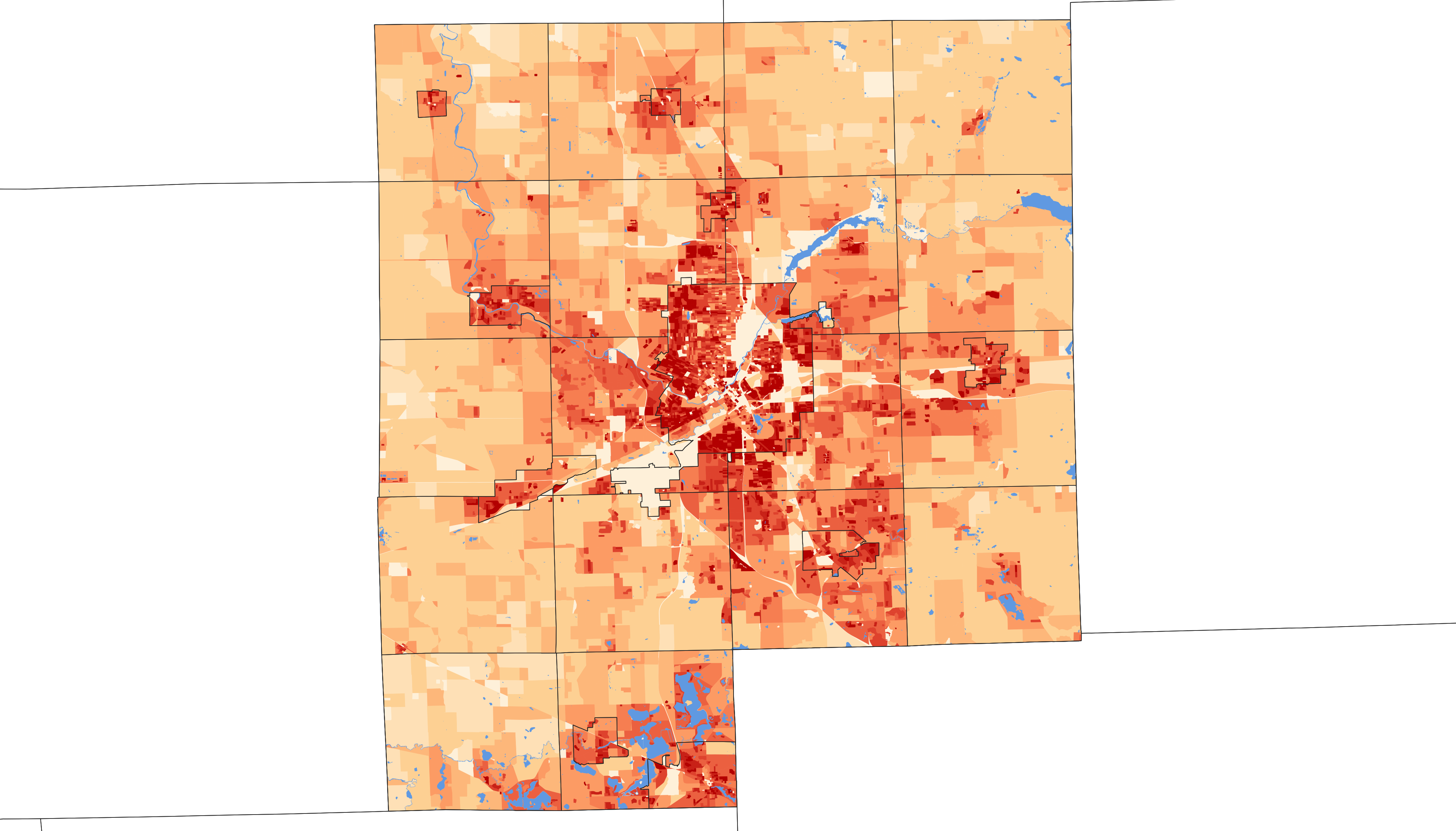
2020 population density of Genesee County MI by census block

=== Recent estimates ===
As of the fourth quarter of 2024, the median home value in Genesee County was $191,311.

As of the 2023 American Community Survey, the average household size was 2.40 persons, the county had a median household income of $60,673, and about 17.9% of the county's population lived at or below the poverty line. Genesee County had an estimated 58.3% employment rate, with 22.8% of the population holding a bachelor's degree or higher and 90.9% holding a high school diploma.

The top five reported languages spoken at home were English (96.2%), Spanish (0.9%), Indo-European (1.0%), Asian and Pacific Islander (0.7%), and other (1.2%).

=== 2020 census ===
As of the 2020 census, 406,211 people, 167,118 households, and 105,520 families were residing in the county. The population density was 637.75 inhabitants per square mile (246.2/km^{2}). The median age was 40.9 years, with 22.2% of residents under 18 and 18.1% were 65 or older. For every 100 females, there were 94.5 males, and for every 100 females 18 and over, there were 91.4 males 18 and over.

The racial makeup of the county was 71.2% White, 19.7% Black or African American, 0.4% American Indian and Alaska Native, 1.0% Asian, <0.1% Native Hawaiian and Pacific Islander, 1.2% from some other race, and 6.5% from two or more races. Hispanic or Latino residents of any race comprised 4.0% of the population.

About 81.8% of residents lived in urban areas, while 18.2% lived in rural areas.

Of the 167,118 households, 28.4% had children under 18 living in them, 40.2% were married-couple households, 20.1% were households with a male householder and no spouse or partner present, and 31.6% were households with a female householder and no spouse or partner present. About 30.9% of all households were made up of individuals, and 12.9% had someone living alone who was 65 or older. The county had 183,087 housing units, of which 8.7% were vacant. Among occupied housing units, 69.4% were owner-occupied and 30.6% were renter-occupied. The homeowner vacancy rate was 1.4% and the rental vacancy rate was 10.2%.

=== Racial and ethnic composition ===
Note: the US Census treats Hispanic/Latino as an ethnic category. This table excludes Latinos from the racial categories and assigns them to a separate category. Hispanics/Latinos may be of any race.

Race / ethnicity (NH = non-Hispanic)	Pop. 1980	Pop. 1990	Pop. 2000	Pop. 2010	Pop. 2020
White alone (NH)	359,214 (79.75%)	331,833 (77.09%)	323,136 (74.09%)	309,683 (72.73%)	283,483 (69.79%)
Black or African American alone (NH)	78,200 (17.36%)	83,707 (19.45%)	88,356 (20.26%)	87,352 (20.52%)	79,080 (19.47%)
Native American or Alaska Native alone (NH)	2,696 (0.60%)	2,918 (0.68%)	2,171 (0.50%)	1,961 (0.46%)	1,391 (0.34%)
Asian alone (NH)	1,936 (0.43%)	2,824 (0.66%)	3,487 (0.80%)	3,834 (0.90%)	4,041 (0.99%)
Pacific Islander alone (NH)	—	—	80 (0.02%)	74 (0.02%)	116 (0.03%)
Other race alone (NH)	754 (0.17%)	300 (0.07%)	541 (0.12%)	390 (0.09%)	1,390 (0.34%)
Multiracial (NH)	—	—	8,218 (1.88%)	9,513 (2.23%)	20,451 (5.03%)
Hispanic or Latino (any race)	7,649 (1.70%)	8,877 (2.06%)	10,152 (2.33%)	12,983 (3.05%)	16,259 (4.00%)
Total	450,449 (100.00%)	430,459 (100.00%)	436,141 (100.00%)	425,790 (100.00%)	406,211 (100.00%)

=== 2024 estimate ===
As of the 2024 estimate, 402,279 people and 166,375 households lived in the county. The population density was 631.58 inhabitants per square mile (243.9/km^{2}). The 184,543 housing units had an average density of 289.73 per square mile (111.9/km^{2}). The racial makeup of the county was 74.6% White, 20.2% African American, 0.6% Native American, 1.3% Asian, and 3.3% from two or more races. Hispanic or Latino people of any race were 4.5% of the population.

=== 2010 census ===
As of the 2010 census, 425,790 people, 169,202 households, and 111,620 families resided in the county. The population density was 668.45 inhabitants per square mile (258.1/km^{2}). The 192,180 housing units had an average density of 301.70 per square mile (116.5/km^{2}). The racial makeup of the county was 74.54% White, 20.70% African American, 0.53% Native American, 0.91% Asian, 0.02% Pacific Islander, 0.71% from some other race, and 2.59% from two or more races. Hispanic or Latino people of any race were 3.05% of the population.

In terms of ancestry, 18.0% were of German, 11.0% Irish, 10.6% English, 5.5% Polish 5.4% American, and 4.8% French.

Of the 169,202 households, 32.6% had children under 18 living with them, 43.3% were married couples living together, 17.2% had a female householder with no husband present, and 34.0% were not families; 28.4% of all households were made up of individuals. The average household size was 2.48, and the average family size was 3.03. The median age was 39 years.

In the county, 25.0% of the population was under 18, 8.9% from 18 to 24, 24.7% from 25 to 44, 27.6% from 45 to 64, and 13.7% was 65 or older. The median age was 39 years. For every 100 females, there were 93.1 males. For every 100 females 18 and over, there were 89.4 males.

The median income in the county for a household was $38,819 and for a family was $48,979. Males had a median income of $27,269 versus $18,082 for females. The per capita income for the county was $19,860. About 16.9% of families and 21.0% of the population were below the poverty line, including 31.0% of those under 18 and 6.3% of those 65 or over.

== Government and politics ==
United States presidential election results for Genesee County, Michigan
Year	Republican		Democratic		Third party(ies)	
Year	No.	%	No.	%	No.	%
1884	4,328	48.14%	3,657	40.68%	1,005	11.18%
1888	5,404	53.17%	3,904	38.41%	856	8.42%
1892	4,785	50.14%	3,712	38.90%	1,046	10.96%
1896	5,638	52.00%	4,915	45.33%	290	2.67%
1900	6,478	59.43%	3,934	36.09%	489	4.49%
1904	6,594	68.65%	2,281	23.75%	730	7.60%
1908	7,211	64.31%	3,234	28.84%	768	6.85%
1912	3,426	25.73%	3,005	22.57%	6,882	51.69%
1916	9,353	48.42%	9,311	48.21%	651	3.37%
1920	24,543	74.66%	7,408	22.54%	922	2.80%
1924	34,264	83.82%	4,225	10.34%	2,389	5.84%
1928	42,743	79.37%	10,910	20.26%	200	0.37%
1932	28,231	41.97%	36,860	54.80%	2,176	3.23%
1936	21,097	28.54%	49,891	67.48%	2,943	3.98%
1940	38,495	43.12%	50,300	56.34%	488	0.55%
1944	41,145	43.72%	52,445	55.72%	527	0.56%
1948	38,270	44.38%	45,032	52.22%	2,926	3.39%
1952	62,220	51.97%	56,753	47.41%	739	0.62%
1956	75,431	54.47%	62,808	45.36%	235	0.17%
1960	74,940	50.82%	72,059	48.87%	458	0.31%
1964	48,311	32.45%	100,346	67.40%	221	0.15%
1968	63,948	38.99%	75,174	45.83%	24,891	15.18%
1972	85,747	52.78%	73,896	45.49%	2,806	1.73%
1976	80,004	46.67%	88,967	51.89%	2,467	1.44%
1980	78,572	42.73%	90,393	49.15%	14,935	8.12%
1984	92,943	50.68%	89,491	48.80%	953	0.52%
1988	70,922	40.10%	104,880	59.30%	1,057	0.60%
1992	47,834	23.92%	105,156	52.58%	47,008	23.50%
1996	49,332	28.34%	106,065	60.94%	18,659	10.72%
2000	66,641	34.92%	119,833	62.78%	4,391	2.30%
2004	83,870	39.23%	128,334	60.03%	1,571	0.73%
2008	72,451	32.86%	143,927	65.27%	4,117	1.87%
2012	71,808	35.24%	128,978	63.30%	2,956	1.45%
2016	84,175	42.59%	102,751	51.99%	10,715	5.42%
2020	98,714	44.51%	119,390	53.84%	3,660	1.65%
2024	105,303	47.16%	114,670	51.36%	3,295	1.48%

United States Senate election results for Genesee County, Michigan1
Year	Republican		Democratic		Third party(ies)	
Year	No.	%	No.	%	No.	%
2024	97,999	44.65%	114,995	52.40%	6,465	2.95%

Michigan Gubernatorial election results for Genesee County
Year	Republican		Democratic		Third party(ies)	
Year	No.	%	No.	%	No.	%
2022	68,282	39.79%	100,325	58.47%	2,987	1.74%

Genesee County has traditionally been a Democratic stronghold, having voted for a Republican candidate just five times since 1932, and not since voting for Ronald Reagan in 1984. However, the county has become significantly more competitive since 2016, with the Democrats carrying it by fewer than ten percentage points in each election since; in 2024, Democratic candidate Kamala Harris won the county by just four points.

The county government operates the jail, maintains rural roads, operates the major local courts, keeps files of deeds and mortgages, maintains vital records, administers public health regulations and safeguards public health, and participates with the state in the provision of welfare and other social services. The county board of commissioners controls the budget but has only limited authority to make laws or ordinances. In Michigan, most local government functions—police and fire, building and zoning, tax assessment, street maintenance, etc.—are the responsibility of individual cities and townships.

The Genesee County Road Commission, an independent county government unit, has five members, appointed by the County Board of Commissioners, with the daily management handled by a manager-director.

Genesee County, except for the City of Flint, is under the jurisdiction of the 67th District Court of Michigan. District Courts have a limited jurisdiction as charged under state law. The 67th District Court operates in seven divisions, each with a single judge except for the Central Court Division, which is used for jury and felony cases.

Genesee County is a founding member of the Karegnondi Water Authority The "outcounty" area (all but the city of Flint) receives library services from the Genesee District Library. The county equivalent for school is the Genesee Intermediate School District, which consist of school districts considered primarily within Genesee County. Charles Stewart Mott Community College is the local community college serving the same area as the GISD.

=== Elected officials ===
Executive offices	Officer	Party
Prosecuting Attorney and County Counsel	David Leyton	Democratic
Sheriff	Christopher R. Swanson	Democratic
County Clerk/Register of Deeds:	Domonique D. Clemons	Democratic
County Treasurer	Sam Muma	Democratic
Drain Commissioner, County Water Agent, and Karegnondi Water Authority CEO	Jeffrey Wright	Democratic
County Surveyor	Kim R. Carlson	Democratic

Board of Commissioners
District	Commissioner	Party
1st	Delrico Loyd, Chair	Democratic
2nd	Charles H. Winfrey	Democratic
3rd	Gary Goetzinger	Republican
4th	Beverly Brown	Democratic
5th	James Avery	Democratic
6th	Shaun Shumaker	Republican
7th	Martin Cousineau	Democratic
8th	Dale Weighill	Democratic
9th	Brian K. Flewelling	Republican

Circuit Court Judges
Division	Judge
Civil/Criminal	B. Chris Christenson
Civil/Criminal	Khary L. Hanible
Civil/Criminal	Elizabeth A. Kelly
Civil/Criminal	Joseph J. Farah
Civil/Criminal	Mark W. Latchana
Civil/Criminal	David J. Newblatt
Civil/Criminal	Brian Pickell
Family Division	Mary A. Hood
Family Division	Anthony J. McDowell
Family Division	Dawn M. Weier

67th District
Division	Judge
Fenton Court, Chief Judge	Mark McCabe
Mt. Morris Court; Chief Judge	Vikki Haley
Davison Court	Jennifer Manley
Flushing Court	David Goggins
4th (Grand Blanc)	Christopher R. Odette
Burton Court	Mark Latchana

- Probate Court Judges
  - Jennie E. Barkey, chief
  - F. Kay Behm

Office	District	Officeholder	Political party
U.S. Representative	7th	Tom Barrett	Republican
U.S. Representative	8th	Kristen McDonald Rivet	Democratic
State Senator	22nd	Lana Theis	Republican
State Senator	24th	Ruth Johnson	Republican
State Senator	26th	Kevin Daley	Republican
State Senator	27th	John Daniel Cherry	Democratic
State Representative	67th	Phil Green	Republican
State Representative	68th	David Martin	Republican
State Representative	69th	Jasper Martus	Democratic
State Representative	70th	Cynthia Neeley	Democratic
State Representative	71st	Brian BeGole	Republican
State Representative	72nd	Mike Mueller	Republican
State Representative	97th	Matthew Bierlein	Republican

== Recreation ==
Genesee County is the only one in Michigan without a state park. The county has a park system headed by a Parks and Recreation Commission and a director appointed by the county board of commissioners recommended by the parks commission. Commission president is Joe Krapohl with Barry June as acting director.

In 1968, the county park system was started with the purchase of vacant land with funds from the Charles Stewart Mott Foundation, with a stipulation that a parks commission be formed.

In January 2018, Genesee County Parks & Recreation purchased land along the Kearsley Creek for $700,000 from the Poulos family, owners of the White Horse Tavern in Flint, with assistance from a Michigan Natural Resources Trust Fund grant. The new Atlas County Park opened on April 29, 2018.

== Communities ==
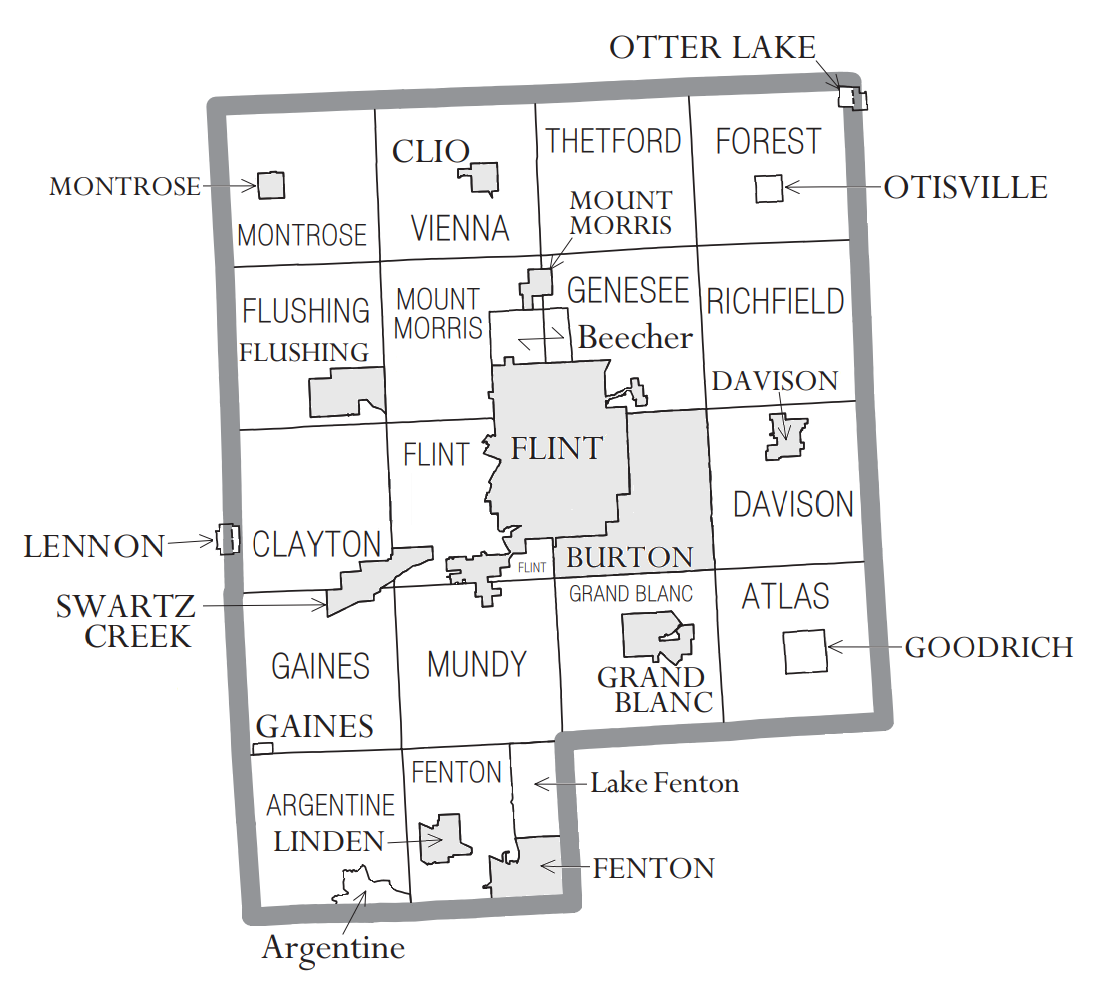
U.S. Census data map showing local municipal boundaries within Genesee County, as well as CDP boundaries. Shaded areas represent incorporated cities.

=== Cities ===
- Burton
- Clio
- Davison
- Fenton (partial)
- Flint (county seat)
- Flushing
- Grand Blanc
- Linden
- Montrose
- Mount Morris
- Swartz Creek

=== Villages ===
- Gaines
- Goodrich
- Lennon (partial)
- Otisville
- Otter Lake (partial)

=== Charter townships ===
- Clayton Charter Township
- Fenton Charter Township
- Flint Charter Township
- Flushing Charter Township
- Genesee Charter Township
- Grand Blanc Charter Township
- Montrose Charter Township
- Mount Morris Charter Township
- Mundy Charter Township
- Vienna Charter Township

=== Civil townships ===
- Argentine Township
- Atlas Township
- Davison Township
- Forest Township
- Gaines Township
- Richfield Township
- Thetford Township

=== Census-designated places ===
- Argentine
- Beecher
- Lake Fenton

=== Other unincorporated communities ===
- Argentine
- Atlas
- Bayport Park
- Beecher
- Brent Creek
- Duffield
- Farrandville
- Genesee
- Huntingtown
- Kipp Corners
- Lake Fenton
- Lakeside
- Pine Run
- Rankin
- Richfield Center
- Rogersville
- Russellville
- Thetford Center
- Whigville
- Whitesburg

== Education ==
Public school districts include:

- Atherton Community Schools
- Beecher Community School District
- Bendle Public Schools
- Bentley Community Schools
- Birch Run Area School District
- Brandon School District
- Byron Area Schools
- Carman-Ainsworth Community Schools
- Clio Area School District
- Davison Community Schools
- Durand Area Schools
- Fenton Area Public Schools
- Flint City School District
- Flushing Community Schools
- Genesee School District
- Goodrich Area Schools
- Grand Blanc Community Schools
- Kearsley Community Schools
- Lake Fenton Community Schools
- Lakeville Community Schools
- Linden Community Schools
- Millington Community Schools
- Montrose Community Schools
- Mount Morris Consolidated Schools
- Swartz Creek Community Schools
- Westwood Heights Schools

The Michigan School for the Blind and the Michigan School for the Deaf moved to Flint in 1994 when the blind school's campus in Lansing closed.

== See also ==
- Back to the Bricks
- List of Michigan State Historic Sites in Genesee County
- National Register of Historic Places listings in Genesee County, Michigan
- The Flint Enquirer
