= Mundy Township, Michigan =

- Charter township
- Charter Township of Mundy
- Motto: Where Town and Country Shake Hands
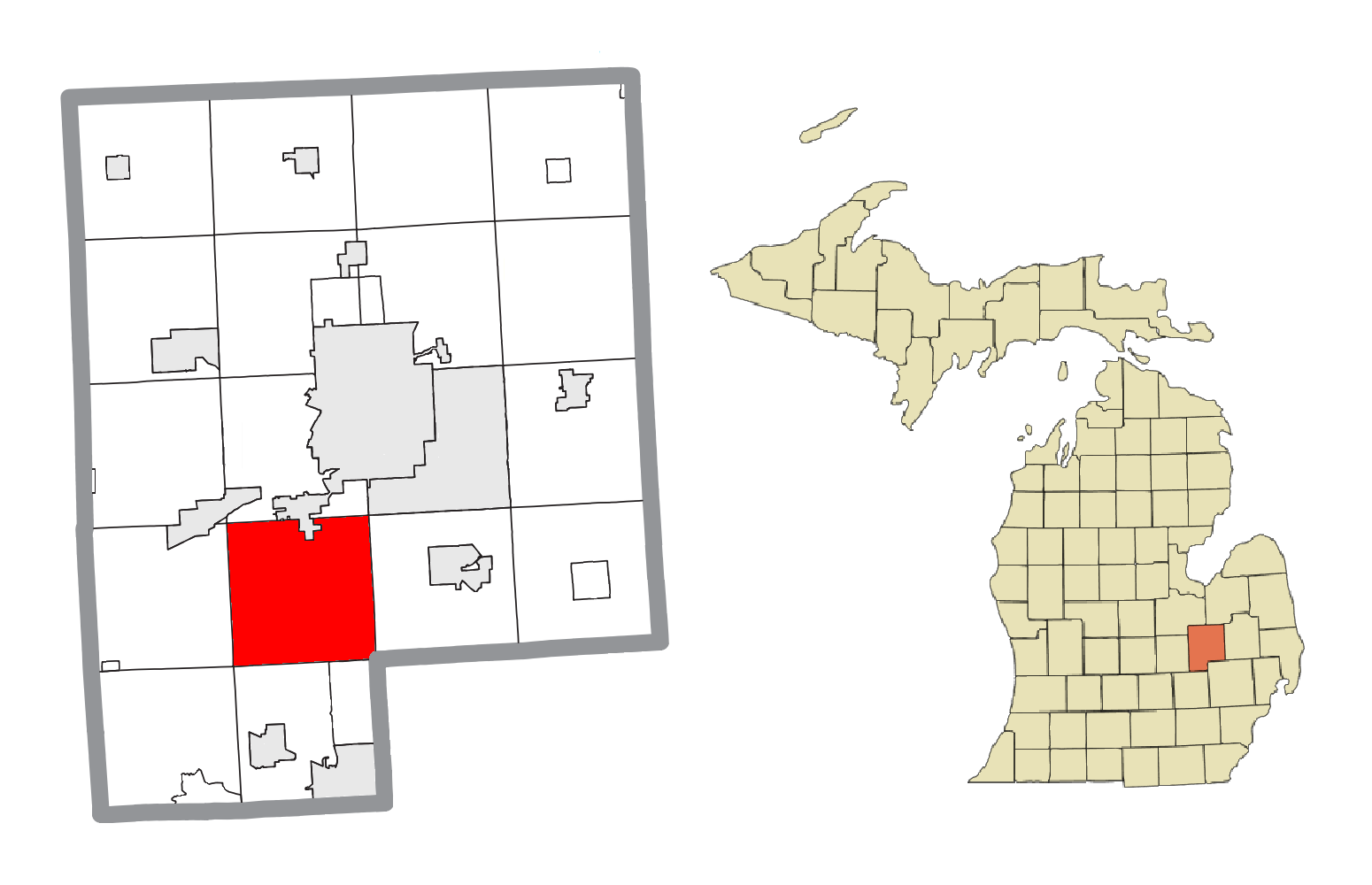
- Location within Genesee County

- Location within the state of Michigan
- Coordinates: 42°54′52″N 83°45′02″W
- Country: United States
- State: Michigan
- County: Genesee
- Settled: 1833
- Organized: 1837
- Named for: Edward Mundy

Government
  - Supervisor: Jennifer Stainton
  - Manager: Chad Young
  - Clerk: Cory Bostwick
  - Treasurer: Danelle Barker
  - Trustees: Leah Davis; Mark Gorton; Zachary Sack; Kyle Ward

Area
  - Total: 36.1 sq mi (93.4 km^{2})
  - Land: 36.0 sq mi (93.2 km^{2})
  - Water: 0.12 sq mi (0.3 km^{2})
- Elevation: 830 ft (253 m)

Population (2020)
  - Total: 15,281
  - Density: 425/sq mi (164/km^{2})
- Time zone: UTC-5 (Eastern (EST))
  - Summer (DST): UTC-4 (EDT)
- ZIP code(s): 48430 (Fenton); 48439 (Grand Blanc); 48442 (Holly); 48473 (Swartz Creek); 48507 (Flint)
- Area code: 810
- FIPS code: 26-56160
- GNIS feature ID: 1626779
- Website: www.mundytwp-mi.gov

The Charter Township of Mundy is a charter township of Genesee County in the U.S. state of Michigan. The population was 15,281 at the 2020 census.

The Survey township area that Mundy mostly covers is township 6 North range 6 East.

== Communities ==
The township has two unincorporated communities within its borders:

- Rankin, original known as Mundy Centre, is located at 42°54′52″N 83°45′02″W, located just west of an exit off U.S. Highway 23 on Grand Blanc Road, east of Jennings Road, south of Flint. The township's offices and Rankin Elementary School are located there. Grand Blanc is several miles to the east by county roads.
- Mundy is located at Linden and Baldwin Roads in the southwest part of the township, which was the location of the Mundy Post Office.

== History ==
In 1833, the first land purchases in Mundy survey township area were made on sections 11-14, with all 40 acres (160,000 m^{2}) in the section purchased by 1837. The first settlement was in section 13 by Jason L. Austin, Daniel Williams and Eli Gilbert. Grand Blanc Township was formed on March 9, 1833 and included multiple township areas including the future Mundy Township.

The township was named after Edward Mundy, lieutenant governor. When organized on March 11, 1837, it included the survey township that would become Gaines Township. The first meeting of the township was held on April 3, 1837 at the Josiah Alger's house with 18 voters. There were 38 total voters at the November 1840 general election. On March 9, 1842, Gaines was split off from Mundy.

In southern part of the township, north of Mount Pleasant, a settlement on the north side of Long Lake (now Lake Fenton), Morgan Baldwin and George Judson settled the location around Baldwin Road soon called Podunk.

A post office opened in the township on May 1, 1848 and was moved to Mt. Pleasant as Long Lake Post Office on March 6, 1851. The office returned to Mundy on March 24, 1852. On March 9, 1855, the Elgin Post Office was opened with postmaster William Moore and was located at Mason Tavern along the Fenton plank road on the Southeast corner of section 13. On April 12, 1871, the Elgin Post Office was closed. The Mundy Post Office was closed on December 31, 1900.

In January and February 2014, Swartz Creek City and Gaines Township was contact by Mundy Township Supervisor David L. Guigear in attempt to meet over regionalization of building department, code enforcement, janitorial and especial police. On April 2, 2014, Gaines Township turned down a police department merger with Mundy Township.

On January 9, 2016, the Swartz Creek City Council voted to disband its police department by merging the department with Mundy Township's into the Metro Police Authority of Genesee County effective February 1, 2016.

Years	Supervisor	Town clerk	Collector	Assessors	Justices of the peace	Constables	Highway commissioners	School inspectors
1837	John Alger	Morgan Baldwin	George Judson	Jonathan G. Firman, Morgan Baldwin, Benjamin Simmons and Seth Kitchen	Benjamin Simmons (1 yr.), Josiah Alger (2 yr.), Morgan Baldwin (3 yr.), Henry M. Thompson (4 yr.)	George Judson, Volney Stiles	J. G. Firman, George Judson and Jeshurum Leach	Jonathan Firman, Ira Dunning and Dudley Brainard

== Geography ==
According to the United States Census Bureau, the township has a total area of 36.1 square miles (93 km^{2}), of which 36.0 square miles (93 km^{2}) is land and 0.1 square miles (0.26 km^{2}) (0.28%) is water. A portion of the township survey area, between Jennings and Torrey Road, was annexed by the City of Flint for Bishop International Airport.

== Demographics ==
Historical population
Census	Pop.	Note	%±
1960	5,004		—
1970	8,029		60.5%
1980	10,786		34.3%
1990	11,511		6.7%
2000	12,191		5.9%
2010	15,082		23.7%
Source: Census Bureau. Census 1960- 2000, 2010.

As of the census of 2000, there were 12,191 people, 4,876 households, and 3,583 families residing in the township. The population density was 338.8 inhabitants per square mile (130.8/km^{2}). There were 5,047 housing units at an average density of 140.3 per square mile (54.2/km^{2}). The racial makeup of the township was 96.04% White, 1.41% African American, 0.22% Native American, 0.82% Asian, 0.01% Pacific Islander, 0.44% from other races, and 1.06% from two or more races. Hispanic or Latino people of any race were 1.85% of the population.

There were 4,876 households, out of which 29.8% had children under the age of 18 living with them, 62.0% were married couples living together, 8.2% had a female householder with no husband present, and 26.5% were non-families. 22.3% of all households were made up of individuals, and 8.1% had someone living alone who was 65 years of age or older. The average household size was 2.49 and the average family size was 2.91.

In the township the population was spread out, with 22.7% under the age of 18, 7.0% from 18 to 24, 29.0% from 25 to 44, 27.9% from 45 to 64, and 13.3% who were 65 years of age or older. The median age was 40 years. For every 100 females, there were 95.7 males. For every 100 females age 18 and over, there were 92.6 males.

The median income for a household in the township was $53,948, and the median income for a family was $62,125. Males had a median income of $51,442 versus $30,067 for females. The per capita income for the township was $23,581. About 1.9% of families and 3.7% of the population were below the poverty line, including 2.6% of those under age 18 and 0.9% of those age 65 or over.

== Government ==
District	Number	Officeholder
U.S. representative	5th	Dan Kildee
State senate	14	Dave Robertson
State representative	50th	Tim Sneller
County commissioner	6th	Drew Shapiro
County commissioner	8th	Ted Hemry
School district	Carman-Ainsworth	Multiple: see articles
School district	Swartz Creek	
School district	Lake Fenton	
School district	Grand Blanc	
Community college	C.S. Mott	Multiple: see article
Polling locations		

As do most townships in Michigan, Mundy Township in Genesee County has a supervisor-board form of government. In this form of government, three members of the board of trustees are executives: supervisor (being the township's chief executive), clerk and treasurer. Four additional trustees are elected to the board.

Roads are administrated by the Genesee County Road Commission while schools are primarily handled by Carman-Ainsworth and the Swartz Creek School Districts. Police services, starting February 1, 2017, are taken care of by the Metro Police Authority of Genesee County, of which Mundy is a member. Mundy Township is within the Genesee District Library system and the local library, including the Perkins Library branch in Swartz Creek. The Genesee District Library levies .998 mills.

=== Metro Police Authority ===
Metro Police Authority of Genesee County
- Common name: Metro Police

Agency overview
- Formed: December 9, 2015
- Preceding agencies: Swartz Creek Police Department; Mundy Township Police Department
- Legal personality: Governmental: Government-owned corporation

Jurisdictional structure
- Operations jurisdiction: Michigan, US
- Population: 17,949
- Legal jurisdiction: Michigan
- Governing body: Police Authority Board
- Constituting instrument: Interlocal Agreement Establishing the Metro Police Authority of Genesee County
- General nature: Local civilian police

Operational structure
- Headquarters: Hill 23 Drive, Mundy Township, Michigan
- Police officers: 29
- Board members responsible: Board chair, Curt Porath; Board vice chair, Kay Doerr
- Agency executive: Matthew Bade, Chief of Police
- Parent agency: Swartz Creek; Mundy Township

Facilities
- Posts: 2
- K9s: 2

Website
- www.metropolicegc.org

Metro Police Authority of Genesee County is county regional police agency formed in 2015 and operational in 2016 to serve multiple local governmental areas in Genesee County.

In January and February 2014, neighboring Swartz Creek City and Gaines Township was contact by Mundy Township Supervisor David L. Guigear in attempt to meet over regionalization of building department, code enforcement, janitorial and especial police. On April 2, 2014, Gaines Township turned down a police department merger with Mundy Township. Swartz Creek Chief Rick Clolinger and Mundy Chief Dan Atkinson visited a consolidated police department in Pennsylvania. Thereafter, Chief Clolinger announced his intent to retire in mid-August 2014 opening up discussion on merging police departments. After approving a share services agreement with Mundy in October 2014, the city had Mundy's police chief serve as chief on Clolinger's retirement date of November 1, 2014. Clolinger started part-time as deputy chief for Mundy on that date. Mundy's and Swartz Creek's officers were sworn into the other department on January 14, 2015 following a period of working in each other's jurisdiction.

Mundy Township Board approved the interlocal agreement on October 12, 2015 with one no vote. Original Mundy board authority members appointed were Trustee Kay Doerr, Township Clerk Tonya Ketzler and Treasurer Joe Oskey. Swartz Creek passed the agreement on October 26 with a vote of 5 to 2. A final merger vote would take place in six months. Original Mundy board authority members appointed were Mayor David Krueger and Councilman Dennis Pinkston and Curt Porath.

On December 9, 2015, the Regional Police Authority Board met for the first time with officers selected were City Councilman Curt Porath as chair and Township Trustee Kay Doerr as vice chair. A tour of a potential new HQ building for the authority was toured.

On January 9, 2016, the Swartz Creek City Council voted 6 to 1 to disband its police department by merging the department with Mundy Township's into the Metro Police Authority of Genesee County effective February 1, 2016 following Mundy's approval. In September 2017, Gaines Township and Authority officers were cross sworn in each other jurisdictions as a form of mutual aid while not necessarily planning to merge with the Authority. By November 23, 2017, the authority began working out of its new headquarters.

In May 2018, Interim Chief Lieutenant Matthew Bade was selected as permanent chief over former Swartz Creek Police Chief/Mundy Township Deputy Chief Rick Clolinger following the February retirement of Police Chief Dan Atkinson. On October 1, 2019, the city turned over the operation of the city’s parking violations bureau to the Metro Police Authority.

At the late November 2018 meeting, the authority board selected Simen, Figura & Parker to prosecute all of the local ordinance violations for the authority. Mundy Township moved to be removed from this arrangement at the advice of its attorney, who did not bid to provide the service.

==== Authority Board ====
The authority board consists of seven members, three from each municipality plus one neutral member selected by the municipal members. The seventh member votes in case of ties. Budget approvals need five votes. Current board members are Kay Doerr, Tonya Ketzler, Joe Oskey, David Krueger, Dennis Pinkston and Curt Porath

== Megasite ==
In 2023, the Michigan Economic Development Corporation was marketing a 970-acre megasite for the development of an industrial project. The site is bounded by Elms Road, Maple Road, Linden Road, and Hill Road, and although contiguous, not all parcels within those boundaries are included. The state hopes to attract an electric vehicle or semiconductor manufacturer with a large site close to railways and freeways. The land had been assembled by the Flint and Genesee Economic Alliance with $260 million in state grants. On July 16, 2025, it was announced that a project by Sandisk to build a $55 billion manufacturing facility on the site had been cancelled due to "massive uncertainty" at the federal level, and that the state would continue to market the site. Concurrently, the Economic Alliance offered Swartz Creek Community Schools $40 million to buy the 1963-built Morrish Elementary School to add to the land.

The assemblage of land, now at 1,000 acres, and displacement of residents has caused controversy. An opponent of the plan was quoted in the Flint Journal as saying, "I think there are nine neighborhoods, four mobile home parks, an elementary school and two daycare centers" on the site.
