= Bentley Community Schools =

School district in Michigan

Address
- 1170 N Belsay Road Burton, Genesee County, Michigan, 48509; United States
- Coordinates: 43°01′24.1″N 83°35′29.8″W

District information
- Grades: PreKindergarten–12
- Established: 1914
- Superintendent: Dr. Kristy Spann
- Schools: 4
- Budget: $13,372,000 2022-2023 expenditures
- NCES District ID: 2604800

Students and staff
- Students: 707 (2024-2025)
- Teachers: 40.43 (on an FTE basis) (2024-2025)
- Staff: 90.52 FTE (2024-2025)
- Student–teacher ratio: 17.49 (2024-2025)
- District mascot: Bulldogs
- Colors: Red, White

Other information
- Website: www.bentleyschools.org

Bentley Community Schools is a public school district in Genesee County, Michigan, in the Genesee Intermediate School District. It serves part of Burton.

== History ==
The district traces its beginnings to 1914, when Seymour Bentley donated land for a one-room schoolhouse. In 1929, the district went from having three teachers to five, and a new seven-room school was under construction to accommodate future growth.

Barhitte Elementary was named for Ruth M. Barhitte, a teacher in the district between 1923 and 1953 who helped organize the parent-teacher association.

The current Bentley High School was dedicated on May 25, 1958. The middle school was dedicated on May 7, 1967.

In 2025, voters approved a bond issue to fund the renovation of a small doctors’ office building next to the middle school into a preschool facility. The building had been donated by McLaren Health Care Corporation. Demand for preschool had exceeded the space available in a single classroom at Barhitte Elementary. The new facility, the Little Bulldogs Learning Center, opened in January 2026.

== Schools ==
Schools in Bentley Community Schools district
School	Address	Notes
Bentley High School	1150 N. Belsay Road, Burton	Grades 9-12.
Bentley Middle School	1180 N. Belsay Road, Burton	Grades 6-8.
Barhitte Elementary	6080 Roberta Street, Burton	Grades K-5
Little Bulldogs Learning Center	1198 N Belsay Rd, Bldg #2, Burton	Preschool.
