= LakeVille Community Schools =

School district in Michigan, United States

Address
- 11107 Washburn Road Otisville, Genesee, Michigan, 48463; United States
- Coordinates: 43°10′08.1″N 83°27′42.8″W

District information
- Grades: PreKindergarten-12
- Superintendent: Dr. James Yake
- Schools: 3
- Budget: $16,188,000 2022-2023 expenditures
- NCES District ID: 2620940

Students and staff
- Students: 1,007 (2024-2025)
- Teachers: 57.99 (on an FTE basis) (2024-2025)
- Staff: 140.66 FTE (2024-2025)
- Student–teacher ratio: 17.37 (2024-2025)

Other information
- Website: www.lakevilleschools.org

LakeView Community Schools is a public school district in the Flint, Michigan area. In Genesee County, it serves Otisville, Otter Lake, and parts of the townships of Forest, Richfield, and Thetford. In Lapeer County, it serves Columbiaville, part of Barnes Lake-Millers Lake, Michigan, and parts of the townships of Deerfield, Marathon, and Oregon.

== History ==
In 1868, a new school was built in Otisville. It was replaced with a new school in 1921, which housed all grades in the district until a new high school was built in 1955. Around 1954, the Otisville and Columbiaville districts merged to form LakeVille Community Schools. The 1921 school, located at the corner of Grove and Center Streets in Otisville, became an elementary school. The current high school opened in fall 1969 and the 1921 school closed. The 1955 high school became the district's middle school.

== Schools ==
Schools in LakeVille Community School District
School	Address	Notes
LakeVille High School	12455 Wilson Rd., Otisville	Grades 9-12
LakeVille Middle School	11107 Washburn Road, Otisville	Grades 5-8
Columbiaville Elementary	4775 Pine St., Columbiaville	Grades PreK-4
LakeVille Preschool	12455 Wilson Rd., Otisville	Preschool
