= Burton, Michigan =

- City
- Flag

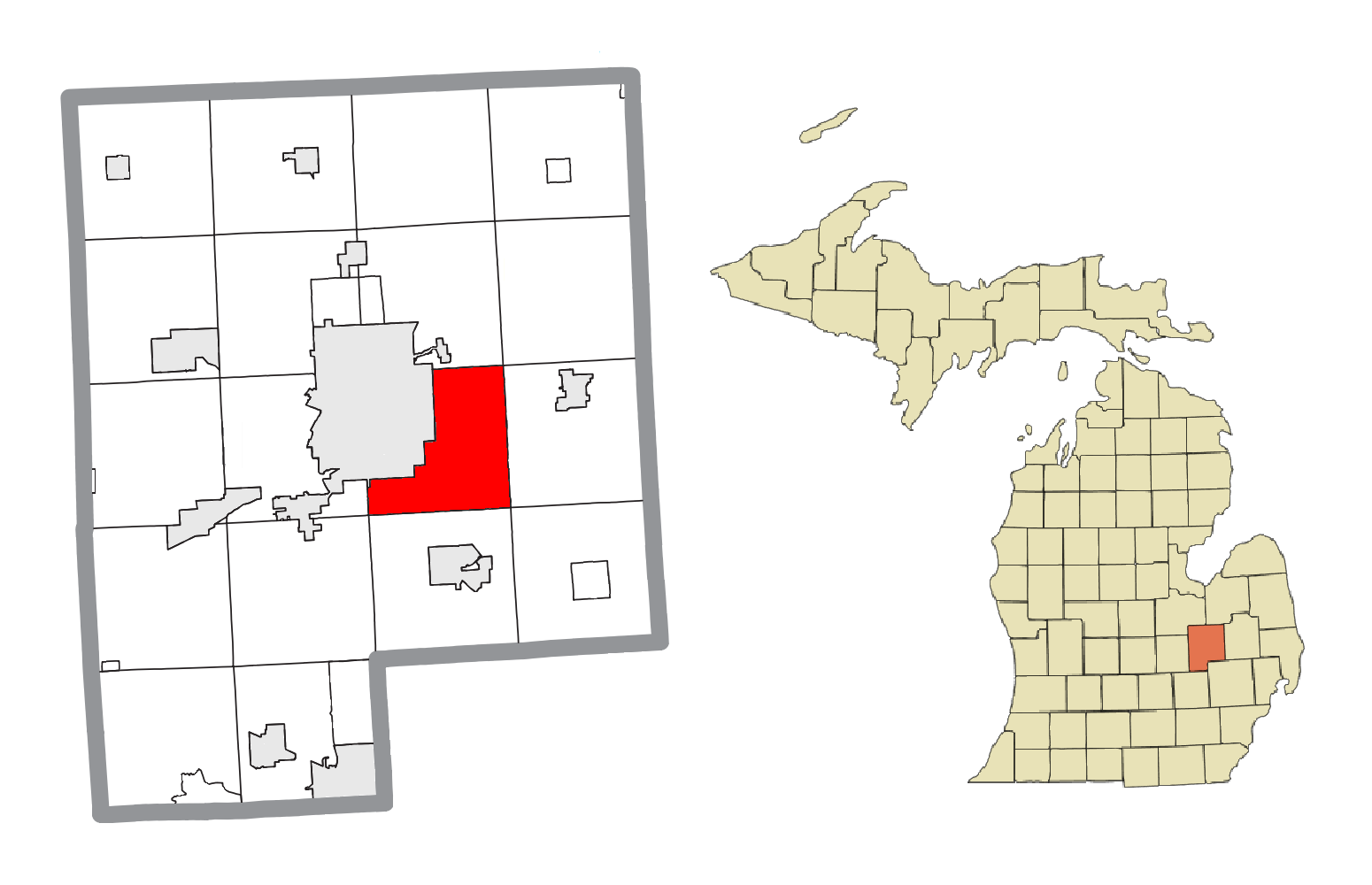
- Location of Burton, Michigan

- Location within the state of Michigan
- Coordinates: 43.000745°N 83.618151°W
- Country: United States
- State: Michigan
- County: Genesee
- Settled: March 10, 1829
- Organized (Burton Township): April 7, 1856
- Incorporated (city): May 16, 1972
- Founder: John Burton

Government
  - Type: Mayor–council
  - Mayor: Duane Haskins
  - President: Gregory Fenner
  - Vice president: Greg Hull
  - Councilmembers: Candice Miller; Steven Heffner; Gary Wines; Christina Hickson; Vaughn Smith

Area
  - Total: 23.424 sq mi (60.668 km^{2})
  - Land: 23.357 sq mi (60.494 km^{2})
  - Water: 0.067 sq mi (0.174 km^{2}) 0.29%
- Elevation: 774 ft (236 m)

Population (2020)
  - Total: 29,715
  - Estimate (2024): 29,420
  - Density: 1,259.5/sq mi (486.29/km^{2})
- Time zone: UTC–5 (Eastern (EST))
  - Summer (DST): UTC–4 (EDT)
- ZIP Codes: 48509, 48519, 48529
- Area code: 810
- FIPS code: 26-12060
- GNIS feature ID: 1675445
- Website: burtonmi.gov

Burton is a city in Genesee County, Michigan, United States and a suburb of Flint. The population was 29,715 at the 2020 census, and was estimated to be 29,420 in 2024. making Burton the second largest city in Genesee County.

== Neighborhoods ==
- Belsay is on Belsay Road at the rail track north of I-69 and Court Street and south of Davison Road.43°01′35″N 83°35′45″W.
- Lapeer Heights is at Belsay Road and Roberta Road and south of Lapeer Road.43°00′31″N 83°35′42″W.

== History ==
Although there were Native Americans and trappers whom lived on land earlier, and even some who attempted to settle by there, many of the original settlers of Burton came from the towns of Adams and Henderson in Jefferson County, New York. For 20 years, this area was known as the Atherton settlement, after brothers Shubael and Perus Atherton and nephew Pliny Atherton Skinner (and later joined by another brother, Adonijah), who settled on the Thread Creek in 1835. Atherton descendants still live in Burton in 2014.

=== Township ===
The City of Burton was organized as Burton Township, in 1856. Burton Township had first been a part of Flint Township. The North part of Burton was part of Kearsley Township along with the Southern part of Genesee Township from 1839 until 1843 when the township was merged back (for school purposes) into Flint Township. When the City of Flint incorporated, Burton Township was separated from Flint Township by the Genesee County Board of Supervisors on October 12, 1855, although the first township meeting did not take place until April 7, 1856, which is sometimes taken as the actual date of organization. On December 13, 1861, a post office was opened with Horace L. Donelson as postmaster and only operated until August 6 of the next year.

Over the years, large portions of the northern and western sides of the township were annexed by the City of Flint for revenues.

=== City ===
On May 16, 1972, township residents voted to incorporate and the City of Burton was officially formed July 1 of that year. Burton began receiving Karegnondi Water Authority water treated by Genesee County Drain Commission Water and Waste Division on December 15, 2017.

== Geography ==
According to the United States Census Bureau, the city has a total area of 23.424 square miles (60.67 km^{2}), of which 23.357 square miles (60.49 km^{2}) is land and 0.190 square miles (0.49 km^{2}) (0.29%) is water.

== Climate ==
This climatic region is typified by large seasonal temperature differences, with warm to hot (and often humid) summers and cold (sometimes severely cold) winters. According to the Köppen Climate Classification system, Burton has a humid continental climate, abbreviated "Dfb" on climate maps.

== Demographics ==
Historical population
Census	Pop.	Note	%±
1880	1,363		—
1890	1,233		−9.5%
1900	1,145		−7.1%
1910	987		−13.8%
1920	2,154		118.2%
1930	6,727		212.3%
1940	10,909		62.2%
1950	18,171		66.6%
1960	29,700		63.4%
1970	32,540		9.6%
1980	29,976		−7.9%
1990	27,617		−7.9%
2000	30,308		9.7%
2010	29,999		−1.0%
2020	29,715		−0.9%
2024 (est.)	29,420		−1.0%
Township until after 1970 census. U.S. Decennial Census; 2020 Census

=== Racial and ethnic composition ===
Burton, Michigan – racial and ethnic composition Note: the US Census treats Hispanic/Latino as an ethnic category. This table excludes Latinos from the racial categories and assigns them to a separate category. Hispanics/Latinos may be of any race.
Race / ethnicity (NH = non-Hispanic)	Pop. 2000	Pop. 2010	Pop. 2020	% 2000	% 2010	% 2020
White alone (NH)	27,538	25,868	23,327	90.86%	86.23%	78.50%
Black or African American alone (NH)	1,073	2,164	2,883	3.54%	7.21%	9.70%
Native American or Alaska Native alone (NH)	208	176	124	0.69%	0.59%	0.42%
Asian alone (NH)	221	174	170	0.73%	0.58%	0.57%
Pacific Islander alone (NH)	8	7	0	0.03%	0.02%	0.00%
Other race alone (NH)	21	15	96	0.07%	0.05%	0.32%
Mixed race or multiracial (NH)	534	665	1,642	1.76%	2.22%	5.53%
Hispanic or Latino (any race)	705	930	1,473	2.33%	3.10%	4.96%
Total	30,308	29,999	29,715	100.00%	100.00%	100.00%

=== American Community Survey ===
As of the 2023 American Community Survey, there are 12,505 estimated households in Burton with an average of 2.35 persons per household. The city has a median household income of $57,767. Approximately 17.1% of the city's population lives at or below the poverty line. Burton has an estimated 59.1% employment rate, with 16.4% of the population holding a bachelor's degree or higher and 89.5% holding a high school diploma. The median age in the city was 42.5 years.

=== Ancestry ===
The top five reported ancestries (people were allowed to report up to two ancestries, thus the figures will generally add to more than 100%) were English (96.8%), Spanish (1.7%), Indo-European (1.2%), Asian and Pacific Islander (0.1%), and Other (0.2%).

=== 2020 census ===
As of the 2020 census, there were 29,715 people, 12,435 households, and 7,767 families residing in the city. The population density was 1,272.21 inhabitants per square mile (491.2/km^{2}). There were 13,292 housing units at an average density of 569.08 per square mile (219.7/km^{2}).

Of the housing stock, 6.4% of units were vacant; the homeowner vacancy rate was 1.3% and the rental vacancy rate was 8.9%.

Of the 12,435 households, 27.7% had children under the age of 18 living in them. Of all households, 39.7% were married-couple households, 20.6% were households with a male householder and no spouse or partner present, and 30.4% were households with a female householder and no spouse or partner present. About 31.1% of all households were made up of individuals and 12.7% had someone living alone who was 65 years of age or older. The average household size was 2.40 and the average family size was 2.98.

The median age was 40.9 years. 21.3% of residents were under the age of 18 and 16.9% were 65 years of age or older. For every 100 females there were 95.5 males, and for every 100 females age 18 and over there were 93.4 males age 18 and over.

100.0% of residents lived in urban areas, while 0.0% lived in rural areas.

Racial composition as of the 2020 census
Race	Number	Percent
White	23,905	80.4%
Black or African American	2,918	9.8%
American Indian and Alaska Native	165	0.6%
Asian	180	0.6%
Native Hawaiian and Other Pacific Islander	0	0.0%
Some other race	399	1.3%
Two or more races	2,148	7.2%
Hispanic or Latino (of any race)	1,473	5.0%

=== 2010 census ===
As of the 2010 census, there were 29,999 people, 11,964 households, and 8,041 families living in the city. The population density was 1,284.37 inhabitants per square mile (495.9/km^{2}). There were 13,075 housing units at an average density of 559.79 per square mile (216.1/km^{2}). The racial makeup of the city was 88.14% White, 7.34% African American, 0.64% Native American, 0.59% Asian, 0.02% Pacific Islander, 0.73% from some other races and 2.53% from two or more races. Hispanic or Latino people of any race were 3.10% of the population.

There were 11,964 households, of which 33.1% had children under the age of 18 living with them, 45.2% were married couples living together, 16.3% had a female householder with no husband present, 5.7% had a male householder with no wife present, and 32.8% were non-families. 27.0% of all households were made up of individuals, and 10.3% had someone living alone who was 65 years of age or older. The average household size was 2.50 and the average family size was 3.00.

The median age in the city was 38.6 years. 24% of residents were under the age of 18; 8.8% were between the ages of 18 and 24; 25.9% were from 25 to 44; 28% were from 45 to 64; and 13.2% were 65 years of age or older. The gender makeup of the city was 48.8% male and 51.2% female.

=== 2000 census ===
As of the 2000 census, there were 30,308 people, 11,699 households, and 8,165 families living in the city. The population density was 1,297.60 inhabitants per square mile (501.0/km^{2}). There were 12,348 housing units at an average density of 528.66 per square mile (204.1/km^{2}).

The racial makeup of the city was 92.09% White, 3.55% African American, 0.76% Native American, 0.74% Asian, 0.03% Pacific Islander, 0.81% from some other races and 2.04% from two or more races. Hispanic or Latino people of any race were 2.33% of the population.

There were 11,699 households, out of which 35.0% had children under the age of 18 living with them, 51.8% were married couples living together, 12.8% had a female householder with no husband present, and 30.2% were non-families. 25.3% of all households were made up of individuals, and 9.0% had someone living alone who was 65 years of age or older. The average household size was 2.58 and the average family size was 3.08.

In the city, the population was spread out, with 27.4% under the age of 18, 8.4% from 18 to 24, 32.0% from 25 to 44, 21.0% from 45 to 64, and 11.2% who were 65 years of age or older. The median age was 35 years. For every 100 females, there were 95.8 males. For every 100 females age 18 and over, there were 92.7 males.

The median income for a household in the city was $44,050, and the median income for a family was $50,332. Males had a median income of $41,433 versus $27,601 for females. The per capita income for the city was $20,548. About 5.5% of families and 8.7% of the population were below the poverty line, including 8.6% of those under age 18 and 9.5% of those age 65 or over.

== Notable people ==
- Sumner Howard, politician and jurist in Michigan and Arizona
- Froggy Fresh, musician
- Nick Khouri, economic advisor and 46th Treasurer of Michigan
- Jill Parr, contemporary Christian musician
- Nedra Pickler, journalist
- Dan Skuta, NFL linebacker
- Paula Zelenko, politician
