= M-54 (Michigan highway) =

State highway in Genesee and Saginaw counties in Michigan, United States

M-54
- M-54 highlighted in red

Route information
- Maintained by MDOT
- Length: 30.276 mi (48.724 km)
- Existed: 1962–present

Major junctions
- South end: I-75 near Grand Blanc
- I-69 at Flint I-475 in Flint; M-57 near Clio M-83 near Birch Run
- North end: I-75 / US 23 in Birch Run

Location
- Country: United States
- State: Michigan
- Counties: Genesee, Saginaw

Highway system
- Michigan State Trunkline Highway System; Interstate; US; State; Byways
← M-53	→ M-55

M-54 is a north–south state trunkline highway in the US state of Michigan that bypasses the city of Flint. It is named Dort Highway for much of its length, in honor of Flint carriage and automobile pioneer Josiah Dallas Dort. The portion from the north end of Dort Highway to Clio Road is part of the historic Saginaw Trail, and was also part of the old Dixie Highway. The modern highway runs for 30.276 miles (48.724 km) through Genesee and Saginaw counties from connections with Interstate 75 (I-75) near Grand Blanc on the south to Birch Run on the north. The highway serves mostly suburban and urban sections of the Flint area. Outside of the city, it also passes through agricultural areas in northern Genesee County and southeastern Saginaw County. It also shares a short east–west section with M-83 near Birch Run.

The first state highway along the general route of M-54 was M-10, one of the original state trunklines signed in 1919. Later, it was redesignated as part of US Highway 10 (US 10) in the 1920s. After a series of realignments in the 1940s and 1960s, the roadway was given the M-54 designation in 1962. A segment of Saginaw Road through Flint was redesignated a business route in the 1940s that became Business M-54 (Bus. M-54) as well in 1962. That business loop was decommissioned in 1974. Previously, two other highways in Michigan bore the M-54 designation: a roadway that is now part of M-37 and one that is Bus. US 2 in Ironwood.

== Route description ==
M-54 starts at exit 109 along I-75 and follows Dort Highway northward through suburban Grand Blanc Township. The area near the southern end is mostly residential, but north of Reid Road, there is the Grand Blanc Metal Center plant for General Motors to the east of the highway. M-54 intersects Hill and Saginaw roads in the unincorporated community of Whigville as the trunkline passes out of the industrial area surrounding the plant. North of the Maple Road intersection, Dort Highway crosses into Burton, and the suburban residential neighborhoods give way to commercial properties along the roadway. There is a rail line leased by Lake State Railway that runs parallel to the highway about a half mile (0.8 km) to the east. North of Atherton Road, M-54 crosses into Flint and runs through the city's east side. The trunkline intersects I-69 near the Amtrak station in the city, and a viaduct with a line of the Canadian National Railway. Between Robert T. Longway Boulevard and Davison Road, Dort Highway passes another industrial area. North of Leith Street, the highway turns to the northwest, and the parallel railroad, still part of the Lake State line, follows suit.

Dort Highway crosses the Flint River on the northeast side of the city near the interchange that connects the highway to I-475. This interchange uses the connection with Stewart Avenue on the western side of the river to provide all of the possible traffic movements between the freeway and the highway. M-54 turns due northerly past the interchange and crosses under the rail line as it heads out of Flint. The area north of the city line on Carpenter Road is dominated by industrial properties as far north as Coldwater Road. Running northward through a more rural area, M-54 passes to the east of Mount Morris. Turning northwesterly, the trunkline is dotted with commercial businesses as it continues to the Clio area. The highway runs parallel to east of the railroad. It passes the Flint Memorial Park cemetery and the Auto City Speedway, a motorsports race track in an area that is otherwise agricultural in nature away from the main highway. The Dort Highway name ends at the intersection with Saginaw Road, and the highway takes on the latter name. East of Clio, M-54 intersects M-57 (Vienna Road) in the unincorporated community of Pine Run.

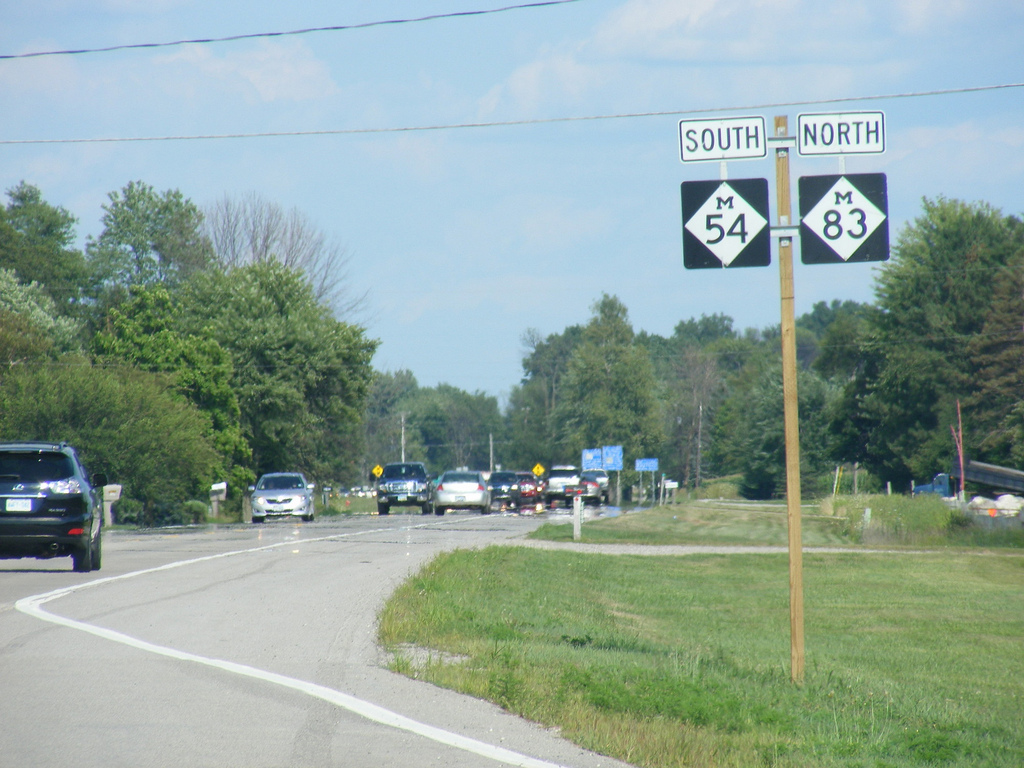
Wrong-way concurrency looking eastward along Birch Run Road

Past the town, M-54 turns due north on Clio Road before crossing into southern Saginaw County. Over the county line, the name changes to Gera Road, and the trunkline runs through farm fields to an intersection with Birch Run Road. At that intersection, M-54 northbound turns westward and joins M-83 to run concurrently to Birch Run while M-83 continues north to Frankenmuth on Gera Road. Birch Run Road carries opposing directions of the two highways, a phenomenon called a wrong-way concurrency. Running westward, the road is signed as both M-54 northbound or M-83 southbound. About two miles (3.2 km) west of the intersection between Gera and Birch Run roads, the two highways meet a common terminus at exit 136 on I-75/US 23 in a commercial district that includes a large outlet mall bordering that freeway.

M-54 is maintained by MDOT like other state highways in Michigan. As a part of these maintenance responsibilities, the department tracks the volume of traffic that uses the roadways under its jurisdiction. These volumes are expressed using a metric called annual average daily traffic, which is a statistical calculation of the average daily number of vehicles on a segment of roadway. MDOT's surveys in 2010 showed that the highest traffic levels along M-54 were the 30,145 vehicles daily north of the I-69 interchange in Flint; the lowest counts were the 2,880 vehicles per day along the M-83 concurrency. M-54 between I-75 in Grand Blanc Township and M-57 near Clio has been listed on the National Highway System, a network of roads important to the country's economy, defense, and mobility.

== History ==
=== Previous designations ===
The first version of M-54 began at M-16 (later US 16) near Grand Rapids and ran northerly along the current M-37 corridor to M-20 (later US 10). This version of M-54 was replaced by an extension of M-37 by 1927. The second incarnation of M-54 was designated in Ironwood along the former US 2 routing through downtown in 1934. This was replaced by the current Bus. US 2 in August 1942.

=== Current designation ===
Originally, Saginaw Road in the Flint area was a part of the Saginaw Trail, a Native American footpath in the area. In the early 20th century, the highway was a part of the Dixie Highway through the area. When the state signed its highway system in 1919, Saginaw Road was part of M-10; later it was used as a section of US 10 in 1926. In August 1926, the Flint City Council renamed the former Western Road after Josiah Dallas Dort, a partner in GM. In 1941, the highway was moved eastward to follow Dort Highway, and the route through the city was designated Bus. US 10.

The current M-54 was designated in 1962 for a former routing of US 10 through the Flint area; US 10 was moved after the completion of the I-75 freeway, and the M-54 designation was applied to the Saginaw Road-Dort Highway routing of US 10 from I-75 in Grand Blanc to M-83 in Birch Run. At the same time, Bus. US 10 became Bus. M-54 through Flint. An extension of Dort Highway in 1987 relocated the southern end of M-54 in Grand Blanc to end at exit 109 on I-75.

== Major intersections ==
County	Location	mi	km	Destinations	Notes
Genesee	Grand Blanc Township	0.000– 0.192	0.000– 0.309	I-75 – Detroit, Flint	Exit 109 on I-75; roadway continues to the south as Dort Highway
Genesee	Flint	7.492– 7.505	12.057– 12.078	I-69 – Lansing, Port Huron	Exit 138 on I-69
Genesee	Flint	10.760– 11.159	17.317– 17.959	I-475; Stewart Avenue	Exit 9 on I-475; access to I-475 via Stewart Avenue only
Genesee	Vienna Township	22.930	36.902	M-57 (Vienna Road) – Clio, Otisville	
Saginaw	Birch Run Township	28.182	45.355	M-83 north (Birch Run Road) – Frankenmuth	Eastern end of M-83 wrong-way concurrency
Saginaw	Birch Run	30.179– 30.276	48.568– 48.724	I-75 / US 23 – Flint, Saginaw	Western end of M-83 concurrency; both end together at exit 136 on I-75/US 23
1.000 mi = 1.609 km; 1.000 km = 0.621 mi: Concurrency terminus

== Business route ==
Business M-54
- Location: Grand Blanc–Mount Morris
- Length: 14.767 mi (23.765 km)
- Existed: 1962–1974

Business M-54 (Bus. M-54) was a business loop in the Flint area. It ran for about 14.8 miles (23.8 km) along Saginaw Road, which was also called Saginaw Street in the city of Flint. The highway connected to its parent, M-54, in Grand Blanc Township on the south end and ran through suburban Burton northwesterly into Flint. There it ran through downtown, passing under I-475 without an interchange. Bus. M-54 ran parallel to that freeway and met I-69/M-21 at an interchange near downtown. There were intersections with both directions of M-56. The highway crossed the Flint River and turned northward. Saginaw Street continued parallel to what is now I-475 before passing out of town. In Mount Morris Township north of Flint, the business loop terminated at the intersection with M-54 (Dort Highway).

Originally, Saginaw Road in the Flint area was a part of the Saginaw Trail, a Native American footpath in the area. When the state signed its highway system in 1919, Saginaw Road was part of M-10. Later it was used as a section of US 10 in 1926. In 1929, the highway was moved eastward to follow Dort Highway, and the route through the city was designated M-10 again. In 1941, this was renumbered to Bus. US 10. Later, in 1962, US 10 was moved again to follow the recently completed I-75 freeway; the former route of US 10 was redesignated M-54 and its business loop was renumbered to match. This business route lasted until 1974; at the same time that I-475 was completed, Bus. M-54 was decommissioned and turned over to local control.

Major intersections

The entire highway was in Genesee County.

Location	mi	km	Destinations	Notes
Grand Blanc Township	0.00	0.00	M-54 (Dort Highway)	
Flint	4.756– 4.767	7.654– 7.672	I-69 / M-21 – Lansing, Port Huron	Present-day exit 136 on I-69
Flint	5.011	8.064	M-56 east (5th Street)	Southern part of a one-way pairing; eastern terminus of M-56
Flint	5.092	8.195	M-56 west (Court Street)	Northern part of a one-way pairing
Mount Morris Township	14.767	23.765	M-54 (Dort Highway)	
1.000 mi = 1.609 km; 1.000 km = 0.621 mi
