= Forest Township, Genesee County, Michigan =

Forest Township, Michigan
- Civil township
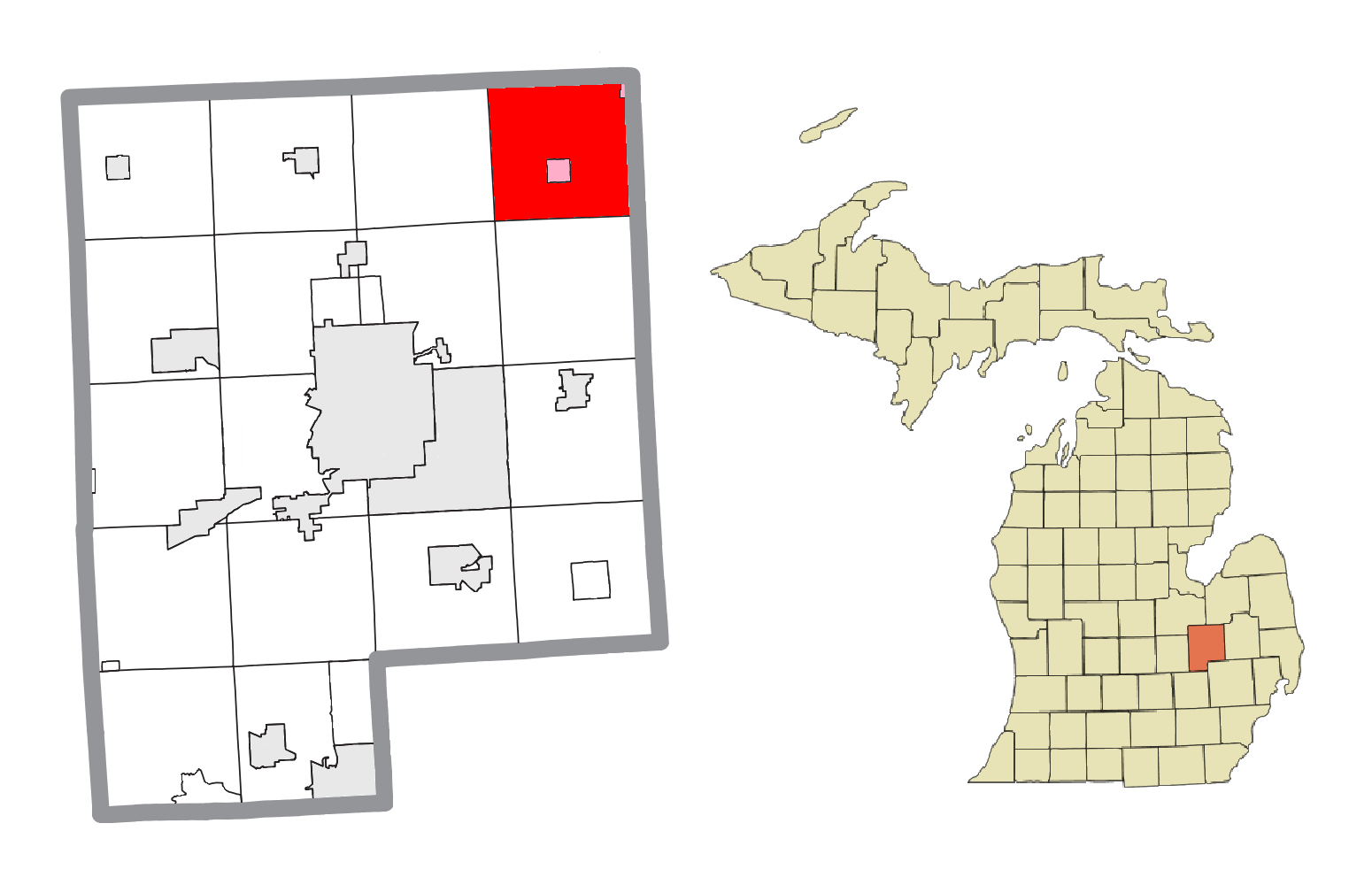
- Location within Genesee County (red) and the administered villages of Otisville and portion of Otter Lake (pink)

- Location within the state of Michigan Forest Township (the United States)
- Coordinates: 43°10′25″N 83°31′16″W
- Country: United States
- State: Michigan
- County: Genesee

Government
  - Supervisor: Mary Ann Price
  - Clerk: Lisa Margrif
  - Treasurer: Linda Smoke

Area
  - Total: 36.1 sq mi (93.6 km^{2})
  - Land: 35.8 sq mi (92.7 km^{2})
  - Water: 0.35 sq mi (0.9 km^{2}) 0.94%
- Elevation: 1,211 ft (369 m)

Population (2020)
  - Total: 4,447
  - Density: 124/sq mi (48.0/km^{2})
- Time zone: UTC-5 (EST)
  - Summer (DST): UTC-4 (EDT)
- ZIP code(s): 48458 (Mount Morris); 48463 (Otisville); 48464 (Otter Lake); 48746 (Millington)
- Area code: 810
- FIPS code: 26-29440
- GNIS feature ID: 1626294
- Website: www.foresttwp.com

Forest Township is a civil township of Genesee County in the U.S. state of Michigan. Survey township designation is 9 north and 8 east. The population was 4,447 at the 2020 census, which makes Forest Township the least populated township in Genesee County.

== Communities ==
- Otisville is a small village within the township.
- Otter Lake is a small village partially within the township in the northeast corner, and is also in Lapeer County's Marathon Township.

== History ==
On March 1, 1836, James Seymour purchased the property first in the future Township in section 36. Henry Heister, with his wife and three children, were the first settlers in the spring of 1837, coming from Livingston County. His home was on the Butternut Creek on the piece of property he purchased, the southwest quarter of section 19. Heister's son, George, was the first born in the Township. With in a few years after arriving, he move to Genesee Township.

The residents petitioned the state to form a township with no name selected. Paris was soon selected but was already taken, then a legislature offered Forest. Originally a part of Richfield Township, Lapeer County, the Township was formed on March 31, 1843 when the range 8 survey townships were transferred from Lapeer County to Genesee County. The 13 voters first met on the first Monday in April 1943 to select their officers, choosing Nathaniel Smith as supervisor.

A U.S. Post Office called Forest was opened in 1855 in section 24 at the residence of the first postmaster, John Crawford. In 1859, the Post Office was moved to Otisville with Robert Shaw appointed deputy postmaster. The Post Office's name was changed in 1861 to Otisville. On June 2, 1882, the Clew Post Office was opened in the northwest part of the Township and was closed on November 28, 1884.

Huntingtown was an unincorporated community in the township that existed in 1873 on State Road (M-15) north of Vienna Road (M-57) and south of Farrand Road at Butternut Creek. In 1885, the first schoolhouse, the Smith school house, was built at the northeast corner of section 33.

== Geography ==
According to the United States Census Bureau, the township has a total area of 36.1 square miles (93 km^{2}), of which 35.8 square miles (93 km^{2}) is land and 0.3 square miles (0.78 km^{2}) (0.94%) is water.

== Demographics ==
As of the census of 2000, there were 4,738 people, 1,706 households, and 1,371 families residing in the township. The population density was 132.4 inhabitants per square mile (51.1/km^{2}). There were 1,774 housing units at an average density of 49.6 per square mile (19.2/km^{2}). The racial makeup of the township was 97.28% White, 0.36% African American, 0.34% Native American, 0.21% Asian, 0.02% Pacific Islander, 0.55% from other races, and 1.25% from two or more races. Hispanic or Latino of any race were 1.18% of the population.

There were 1,706 households, out of which 35.7% had children under the age of 18 living with them, 68.4% were married couples living together, 7.9% had a female householder with no husband present, and 19.6% were non-families. 15.9% of all households were made up of individuals, and 5.3% had someone living alone who was 65 years of age or older. The average household size was 2.77 and the average family size was 3.07.

In the township the population was spread out, with 25.4% under the age of 18, 8.4% from 18 to 24, 29.7% from 25 to 44, 27.5% from 45 to 64, and 9.0% who were 65 years of age or older. The median age was 38 years. For every 100 females, there were 103.3 males. For every 100 females age 18 and over, there were 99.8 males.

The median income for a household in the township was $51,235, and the median income for a family was $57,880. Males had a median income of $48,393 versus $22,788 for females. The per capita income for the township was $20,773. About 1.1% of families and 3.0% of the population were below the poverty line, including 1.4% of those under age 18 and 3.2% of those age 65 or over.
