= Vienna Township, Genesee County, Michigan =

Vienna Township
- Charter township
- Charter Township of Vienna
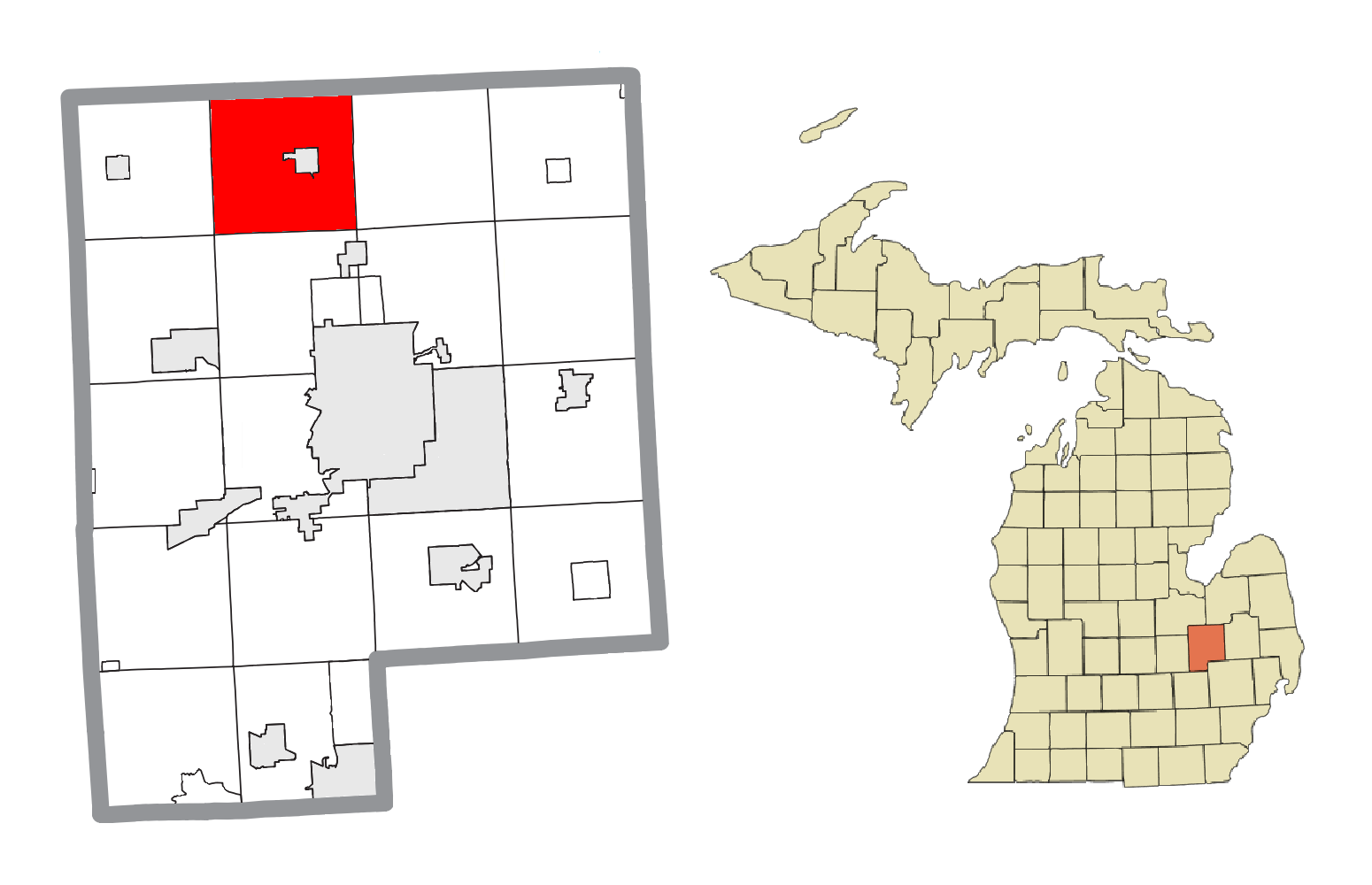
- Location within Genesee County

- Location within the state of Michigan
- Coordinates: 43°10′48″N 83°45′17″W
- Country: United States
- State: Michigan
- County: Genesee
- Organized: 1837

Government
  - Supervisor: Randy Taylor
  - Clerk: Cindy Bryan
  - Treasurer: David Cain

Area
  - Total: 35.1 sq mi (90.8 km^{2})
  - Land: 35.0 sq mi (90.7 km^{2})
  - Water: 0.039 sq mi (0.1 km^{2}) 0.11%
- Elevation: 696 ft (212 m)

Population (2020)
  - Total: 13,301
  - Density: 380/sq mi (147/km^{2})
- Time zone: UTC-5 (Eastern)
  - Summer (DST): UTC-4 (Eastern)
- ZIP code(s): 48415 (Birch Run); 48420 (Clio); 48458 (Mount Morris)
- Area code: 810
- FIPS code: 26-82380
- GNIS feature ID: 1627201
- Website: www.viennatwp.com

Vienna Charter Township is a charter township of Genesee County in the U.S. state of Michigan. The population was 13,301 at the 2020 census, slightly up from 13,255 at the 2010 census.

== Communities ==
- Farrandville is a small unincorporated community within the township at the junction of Saginaw Road (M-54) with Farrand and Tuscola Roads at 43°11′39″N 83°43′36″W just northeast of Clio. It was named for Ira T. Farrand.
- Pine Run is a small unincorporated community within the township at the junction of Saginaw (M-54) and Vienna Roads (M-57) at 43°10′40″N 83°42′51″W just east of Clio. The first settlers, Charles McLean and Sylvester Hubbard, located near the Pine Run Creek in 1833. A post office named Pine Run was established on January 15, 1836 with McLean as the first postmaster. A community was platted and recorded with the name Vienna, but when the township was organized with that name in 1837, the town's name was changed to Pine Run. The post office was changed to Thetford on December 26, 1844, but was restored to Pine Run from 1852 to 1867 and from 1898 to 1905.

== History ==
On January 15, 1836, Pine Run Post Office was opened and renamed and move to Thetford on December 26, 1844. A new Pinerun, or Pine Run, Post Office was opened on January 26, 1852. On November 15, 1905, the Pine Run Post Office was closed.

On Monday November 27, 2017, the northern loop set of municipalities, including Vienna, began receiving water from the Karegnondi Water Authority pipeline and treated by Genesee County Drain Commission Water and Waste Division.

== Geography ==
According to the United States Census Bureau, the township has a total area of 35.0 square miles (90.8 km^{2}), of which 34.96 square miles (90.7 km^{2}) is land and 0.04 square mile (0.1 km^{2}) (0.11%) is water.

== Demographics ==
As of the census of 2000, there were 13,108 people, 4,926 households, and 3,669 families residing in the township. The population density was 374.4 inhabitants per square mile (144.6/km^{2}). There were 5,199 housing units at an average density of 148.5 per square mile (57.3/km^{2}). The racial makeup of the township was 95.99% White, 1.12% African American, 0.51% Native American, 0.34% Asian, 0.01% Pacific Islander, 0.78% from other races, and 1.24% from two or more races. Hispanic or Latino of any race were 1.97% of the population.

There were 4,926 households, out of which 33.4% had children under the age of 18 living with them, 59.1% were married couples living together, 10.8% had a female householder with no husband present, and 25.5% were non-families. 20.7% of all households were made up of individuals, and 6.9% had someone living alone who was 65 years of age or older. The average household size was 2.61 and the average family size was 3.00.

In the township the population was spread out, with 24.8% under the age of 18, 9.1% from 18 to 24, 28.3% from 25 to 44, 26.0% from 45 to 64, and 11.8% who were 65 years of age or older. The median age was 38 years. For every 100 females, there were 98.8 males. For every 100 females age 18 and over, there were 94.3 males.

The median income for a household in the township was $46,863, and the median income for a family was $52,060. Males had a median income of $46,073 versus $26,684 for females. The per capita income for the township was $21,711. About 6.6% of families and 8.3% of the population were below the poverty line, including 13.8% of those under age 18 and 3.0% of those age 65 or over.

== Government ==
The township receives water from the Karegnondi Water Authority pipeline treated by Genesee County Drain Commission Water and Waste Division.

Vienna Township is part of the following:

- Genesee County Commissioner Districts 7, 8
- Michigan House of Representatives District 48
- State Senate District 27
- 67th District Court Division 1
- Michigan's 5th Congressional District
- Genesee District Library

Educational services are primarily provided by Clio Area School District while small parts of the township are served by Birch Run Area School District and Mt. Morris Consolidated Schools.
