= Interstate 475 (Michigan) =

Interstate Highway in Genesee County, Michigan, United States

Interstate 475
- UAW Freeway; David Dunbar Buick Freeway
- Map of Flint with I-475 highlighted in red

Route information
- Auxiliary route of I-75
- Maintained by MDOT
- Length: 16.866 mi (27.143 km)
- Existed: November 9, 1973–present
- NHS: Entire route

Major junctions
- South end: I-75 near Grand Blanc
- I-69 in Flint; M-21 in Flint; M-54 in Flint
- North end: I-75 / US 23 near Mount Morris

Location
- Country: United States
- State: Michigan
- Counties: Genesee

Highway system
- Interstate Highway System; Main; Auxiliary; Suffixed; Business; Future; Michigan State Trunkline Highway System; Interstate; US; State; Byways
← I-375	→ I-496

Interstate 475 (I-475) is a north–south auxiliary Interstate Highway in the US state of Michigan. I-475 is a 16.9-mile (27.2 km) bypass route that serves the downtown area of Flint while its parent, I-75, passes through the west side of the city. I-475 starts southwest of Grand Blanc and runs through suburbs of Flint before passing through downtown. There, it intersects I-69 and crosses the Flint River. The freeway turns westerly to connect back to I-75 north of Flint near Mount Morris.

This component freeway of the State Trunkline Highway System was planned in the 1950s and built in the 1970s. The trunkline was first named the Buick Freeway to honor David Dunbar Buick's contributions to Flint's early automotive industry as founder of Buick Motor Company. I-475 was renamed in 1981 the UAW Freeway, honoring the United Auto Workers, a labor union which was active in Flint. At the same time, the name of I-69 in Flint was changed from the "Chevrolet Freeway" to the "Chevrolet-Buick Freeway". Since 2001, I-475 has borne both the UAW and Buick names officially.

== Route description ==
I-475 starts at a partial interchange with I-75 in Grand Blanc Township, southwest of Grand Blanc. From this start at exit 111, the freeway proceeds northward through a suburban residential area next to a baseball field complex. As I-475 continues northward, it has an interchange with Hill Road near the Crestwood Memorial Gardens cemetery and several commercial properties. North of the Maple Avenue underpass, the freeway crosses into the suburb of Burton where it runs for about 1 1/2 miles (2.4 km) before crossing into the city of Flint. The freeway then curves around to the northeast near Thread Lake, crossing over Saginaw Street. I-475 follows the western shore of the lake as it turns northward to run into downtown Flint.

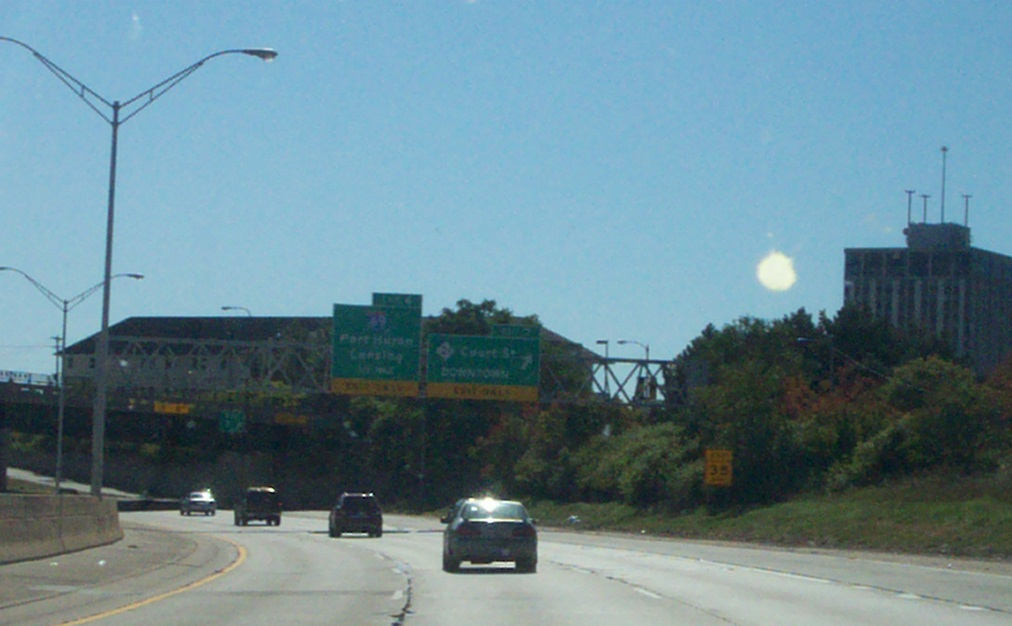
A view of I-475, looking southbound

South of the four-level stack interchange with I-69, I-475 crosses over a line of the Canadian National Railway. North of this interchange, the freeway runs more northwesterly as it skirts the eastern edge of downtown Flint. Near the campus of the University of Michigan–Flint, I-475 curves to run parallel to the Flint River before crossing it next to an industrial area. There is an interchange complex on the northwest side of the river that provides access to Stewart Avenue and M-54 (Dort Highway). I-475 then runs north and northwesterly parallel to a rail line operated by Lake State Railway. North of Carpenter Road, the freeway exits the city of Flint and enters Genesee Township. The Interstate turns to the west to cross into Mount Morris Township before meeting an interchange for Saginaw Street. There is one more interchange for Clio Road before I-475 terminates at a full interchange at exit 125 on I-75 and US Highway 23 (US 23).

I-475 is maintained by the Michigan Department of Transportation (MDOT) like other state highways in Michigan. According to the department's surveys in 2010, the highest traffic levels along I-475 were the 57,400 vehicles on average daily north of the I-69 interchange in Flint; the lowest counts were the 18,637 vehicles per day west of the Clio Road interchange. As an Interstate Highway, I-475 has been listed on the National Highway System, a network of roads important to the country's economy, defense, and mobility.

== History ==
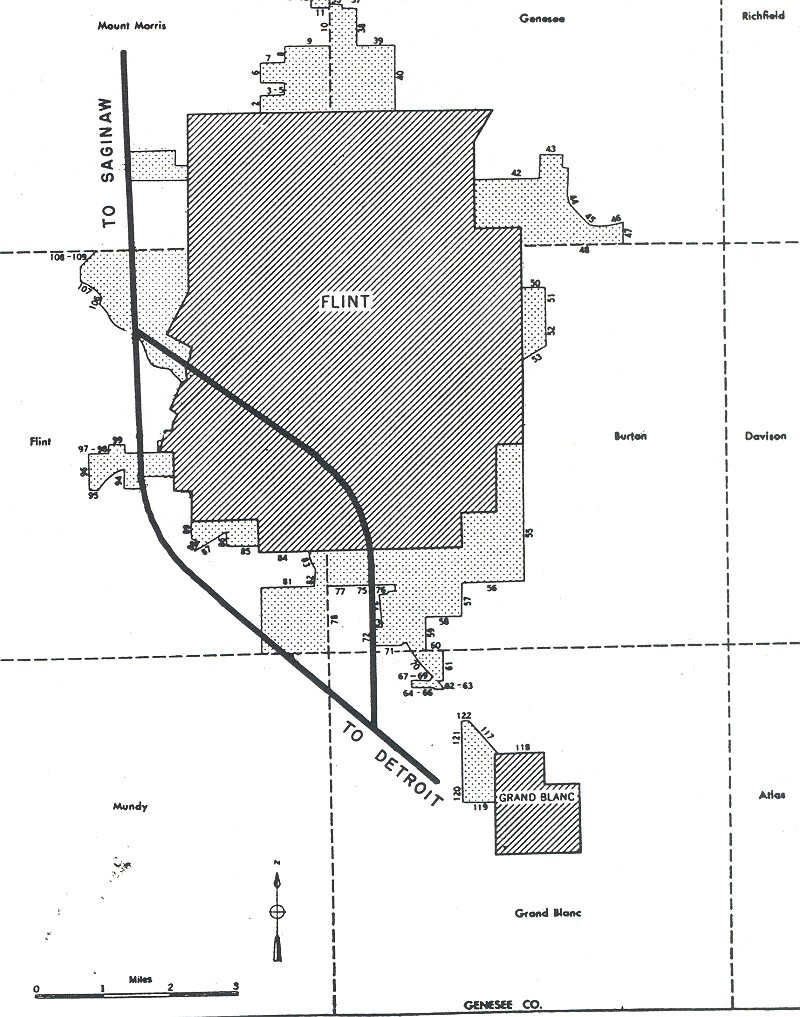
Planning map for Interstate freeways in Flint

A freeway along the I-475 corridor was proposed in the 1950s. The 1955 General Location of National System of Interstate Highways, an early proposal for what would become the Interstate Highway System, contained an inset of the proposed freeways in and around the Flint area, including a loop route freeway near the downtown area. Designated as part of the Interstate Highway System in 1957, I-475 construction was funded by the federal government.

I-475 was first opened to traffic in the early 1970s. The first section was built between I-75/US 10 northward to M-21/M-78. The second section was built from I-75/US 10/US 23 to Business M-54 (Bus M-54) along the north side of town. These two sections were opened on November 9, 1973, and September 26, 1974, respectively. The final section was opened between them in 1981.

== Memorial highway designations ==
I-475 has carried two different memorial highway designations in its history, the Buick Freeway and the UAW Freeway.

David Dunbar Buick was a Scottish-born immigrant who moved to Detroit with his parents at the age of two in 1856–1857. He quit school to supplement the family's income after his father's 1860 death. In the 1880s, he was a plumbing supplier in the Detroit area, inventing a process that created a cheaper white bathtub. Buick produced a method for permanently coating cast iron with vitreous enamel, which allowed the production of white baths at lower cost. He later sold his plumbing business and the patents to American Standard. Using the profits from this sale, Buick started working on gasoline engines, and later automobiles. He eventually moved his operations from Detroit to the Flint Wagon Works. William C. Durant managed the fledgling Buick Manufacturing Company, making it the number one car-building company in the country by 1908. Durant later built on the foundation of Buick's company to create General Motors. In honor of Buick's contributions to Flint's manufacturing base, the Flint City Commission proposed naming I-475 after Buick. The freeway passed by the city's Buick plant and many of the employees would use the new freeway on their commutes to work. The Michigan Legislature passed Concurrent Resolution 22 in 1969 to add the name.

The United Auto Workers (UAW) was founded in Detroit on August 26, 1935. The labor union struggled to gain members until the Flint sit-down strike in 1937. The strike started on December 30, 1936, when workers at the Fisher Body Plant No. 1 stopped loading tool dies on the night shift, locking themselves into the plant. The dies were destined for shipment to plants where union activity was much weaker than the UAW-organized plants in Flint. On January 3, 1937, workers at the plant sat down on the job; Fisher Plant No. 2 later joined in the sit-down strike. The heat was shut off at the plants, and, on January 11, food deliveries were stopped, sparking a riot. Governor Frank Murphy mobilized 4,000 National Guard troops to keep peace at the plants. A second riot occurred at Chevrolet Plant No. 4 on February 1. The National Guard troops surrounded the 12 striking plants in Flint, but the governor never ordered them into action. President Franklin D. Roosevelt encouraged the two parties to sit down once more, and an agreement was signed, recognizing the UAW in the 17 striking plants across the country.

A local politician wanted to honor not just the automotive pioneers in Flint but the workers that worked in the plants. Since the UAW came to maturity in Flint as a result of the strikes, it was the appropriate location for a memorial highway designation. In 1980, the Michigan Legislature passed House Concurrent Resolution 583, renaming Flint's east–west freeway (I-69) the "Chevrolet–Buick Freeway" and I-475 the "UAW Freeway". I-475 was dedicated with its new name on Labor Day 1981.

Public Act 142 of 2001 consolidated the memorial highway designations of the state. In passing this act, the Michigan Legislature expanded the Chevrolet–Buick Freeway to encompass all of I-69 in Genesee County; the act also restored Buick's name to I-475.

== Future ==
The Genesee County Board of Commissioners has proposed to MDOT that I-475 should be connected to US 23 in the southern part of Genesee County. The board approved a study to investigate the economic impact of such an extension. The study will also examine how such an extension will impact an existing intermodal transportation hub at Bishop International Airport and a rail terminal being built at the former Buick City complex. Proposals for the freeway connection have been around since the late 1990s, but they were indefinitely postponed in 2011.

== Exit list ==
The entire highway is in Genesee County.

Location	mi	km	Exit	Destinations	Notes
Grand Blanc Township	0.000	0.000	—	I-75 south – Detroit	Southbound exit and northbound entrance; exit 111 on I-75
Grand Blanc Township	1.726	2.778	2	Hill Road	Access to northbound I-75
Burton	3.814	6.138	4	Bristol Road, Hemphill Road	
Flint	4.823	7.762	5	Atherton Road	Southbound exit and northbound entrance only
Flint	6.458– 6.501	10.393– 10.462	6	I-69 – Port Huron, Lansing	Exit 137 on I-69
Flint	6.829	10.990	7	M-21 west (Court Street) – Downtown	
Flint	7.580	12.199	8A	Robert T. Longway Boulevard	
Flint	8.262	13.296	8B	Davison Road, Hamilton Avenue	Davison Road becomes Hamilton Avenue west of interchange; also access to Broadway Boulevard
Flint	9.662– 9.899	15.549– 15.931	9	M-54 (Dort Highway); Stewart Avenue	
Flint	10.211	16.433	10	Pierson Road	Ramps removed 2025; was indirect access via Selby Street and Horton Avenue
Flint	11.310	18.202	11	Carpenter Road	
Mount Morris Township	13.115	21.107	13	Saginaw Street – Mount Morris	
Mount Morris Township	15.151	24.383	15	Clio Road	
Mount Morris Township	16.402– 16.866	26.396– 27.143	—	I-75 / US 23 – Saginaw, Detroit	Exit 125 on I-75/US 23
1.000 mi = 1.609 km; 1.000 km = 0.621 mi: Incomplete access
