= Otisville =

Otisville may refer to the following American locations:

- Grand Rivers, Kentucky, previously known as Otisville
- Otisville, Michigan
- Otisville, New York
