= Clio Depot =

- U.S. National Register of Historic Places
- Michigan State Historic Site
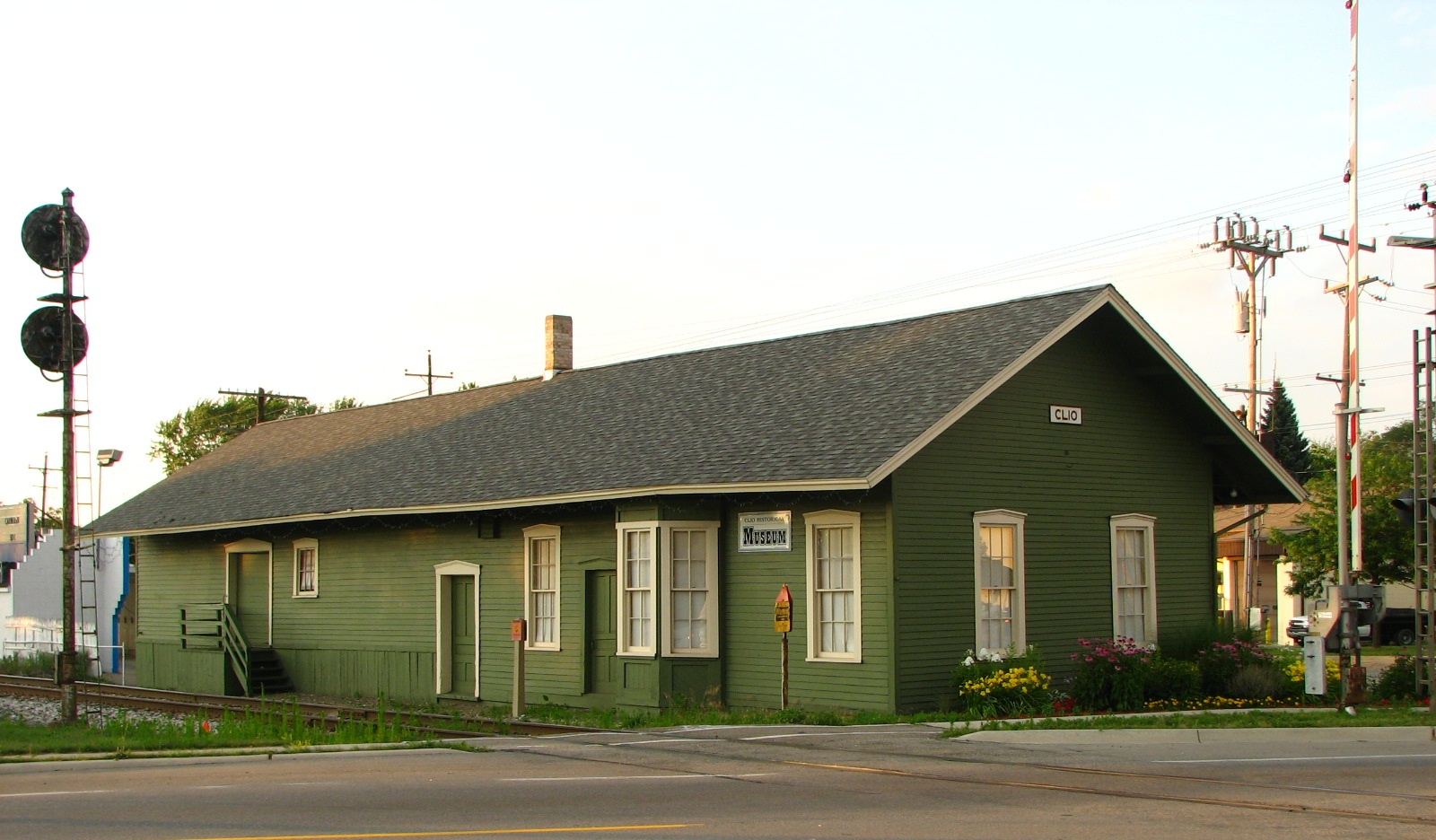
- Interactive map
- Location: 300-308 W. Vienna Rd., Clio, Michigan
- Coordinates: 43°10′39″N 83°44′15″W
- Area: less than one acre
- Built: 1873
- MPS: Genesee County MRA
- NRHP reference No.: 83000842
- Added to NRHP: June 20, 1983

The Clio Depot is a former railroad depot located at 300-308 West Vienna Road in Clio, Michigan. It was listed on the National Register of Historic Places in 1983. The building has been converted into the Clio Depot and Museum.

== History ==
In 1861, the Pere Marquette Railway constructed a line through Clio to Flint (now the CSX Saginaw Subdivision) . The depot in Clio was constructed in 1873 to service the line. The building was used by the railroad until 1960. After its use as a depot was discontinued, it spent some time as a laundromat. The building was purchased by the Clio Area Historic Association in 1977, and was renovated in the 1980s to turn into a museum.

== Description ==
The Clio Depot is a one-story vernacular frame structure clad with clapboard. The building is rectangular and has a gable roof. Decoration is minimal, confined to the pedimented hoods located above the windows and doors.
