= Cummings Center =

Convention center

- Interactive map of Cummings Center
- Address: 6130 E Mt Morris Rd
- Location: Mount Morris Township, Michigan
- Coordinates: 43°7′15.402″N 83°35′20.418″W
- Owner: Genesee County
- Type: Convention center

Website
- Official website

The Everett A. Cummings Center (Cummings Center for short) is an indoor/outdoor convention center and fairgrounds in Mount Morris Township, Michigan. It was built in 1969 as the permanent home of the Genesee County Fair, held every year at the complex.

There are several buildings in the complex, including a 30,000-square-foot (3,000 m^{2}) arena seating 3,000 in bleachers and a 96-foot (29 m)-by-300-foot (28,800-square-foot) exhibit building, along with an outdoor grandstand and an indoor arena. It is part of the Genesee County Parks and Recreation system.

In addition to the Genesee County Fair, it is also used for equestrian and athletic events, trade shows, and other special events.
