= Birch Run High School =

Public high school in Birch Run, Michigan

Location
- 12450 Church Street; Birch Run, Michigan 48415; United States; 43.24424°N 83.79615°W

Information
- School type: Public, High school
- Motto: "One School, One Family!"
- Status: Open
- School district: Birch Run Area Schools
- Superintendent: Diane Martindale
- CEEB code: 230325
- NCES School ID: 260582004210
- Principal: Joe Birkmeier
- Teaching staff: 26.88 (FTE)
- Grades: 9 to 12
- Gender: Co-ed
- Enrollment: 531 (2023-2024)
- Student to teacher ratio: 19.75
- Colors: Blue and Gold
- Athletics conference: Mid-Michigan Activities Conference
- Sports: Baseball, basketball, football, track and field, softball, wrestling
- Mascot: Panther
- Feeder schools: Marshall Greene Middle School
- Website: Official website

Birch Run High School is a public high school located at 12450 Church Street in Birch Run, Michigan and part of the Birch Run Area Schools district. Birch Run's mascot is the panther, and its colors are blue and gold. The school is a member of the Michigan High School Athletic Association (MHSAA) and the Mid-Michigan Activities Conference (MMAC). Birch Run entered the MMAC at the start of the 2024-25 school year after spending decades in the Tri-Valley Conference as an original, founding member. Its team sports include baseball, basketball, bowling, cheerleading, cross country running, football, golf, powerlifting, soccer, softball, track and field, volleyball, wrestling.
