= Saginaw Trail =

Set of connected roads in Michigan

Saginaw Trail is the collective name for a set of connected roads in Southeast and Central Michigan that runs from Detroit to Saginaw through Pontiac and Flint that was originally a tribal foot trail. To drive it today, drivers would follow:

- M-1 (Woodward Avenue) from Detroit to Birmingham;
- Old Woodward Avenue through Birmingham;
- M-1 (Woodward Avenue) from Birmingham to Pontiac;
- Bus. US 24 (Woodward Avenue) into downtown Pontiac;
- Former routing of Saginaw Street through downtown within the Woodward Avenue Loop;
- Bus. US 24 (Cesar E. Chavez Avenue) north of the Woodward Avenue Loop;
- US 24 (Dixie Highway) north of Pontiac to Clarkston;
- Dixie Highway, a set of various county roads that were previously US 10 from Clarkston to near Grand Blanc;
- Saginaw Road and Saginaw Street through Grand Blanc, Burton, and Flint to north of Mount Morris;
- M-54 (Saginaw Road) from north of Mount Morris near Clio to the Genesee–Saginaw County line;
- Dixie Highway and Genesee Avenue into Saginaw.
