= Mount Morris Township, Michigan =

- Charter township
- Mount Morris Charter Township
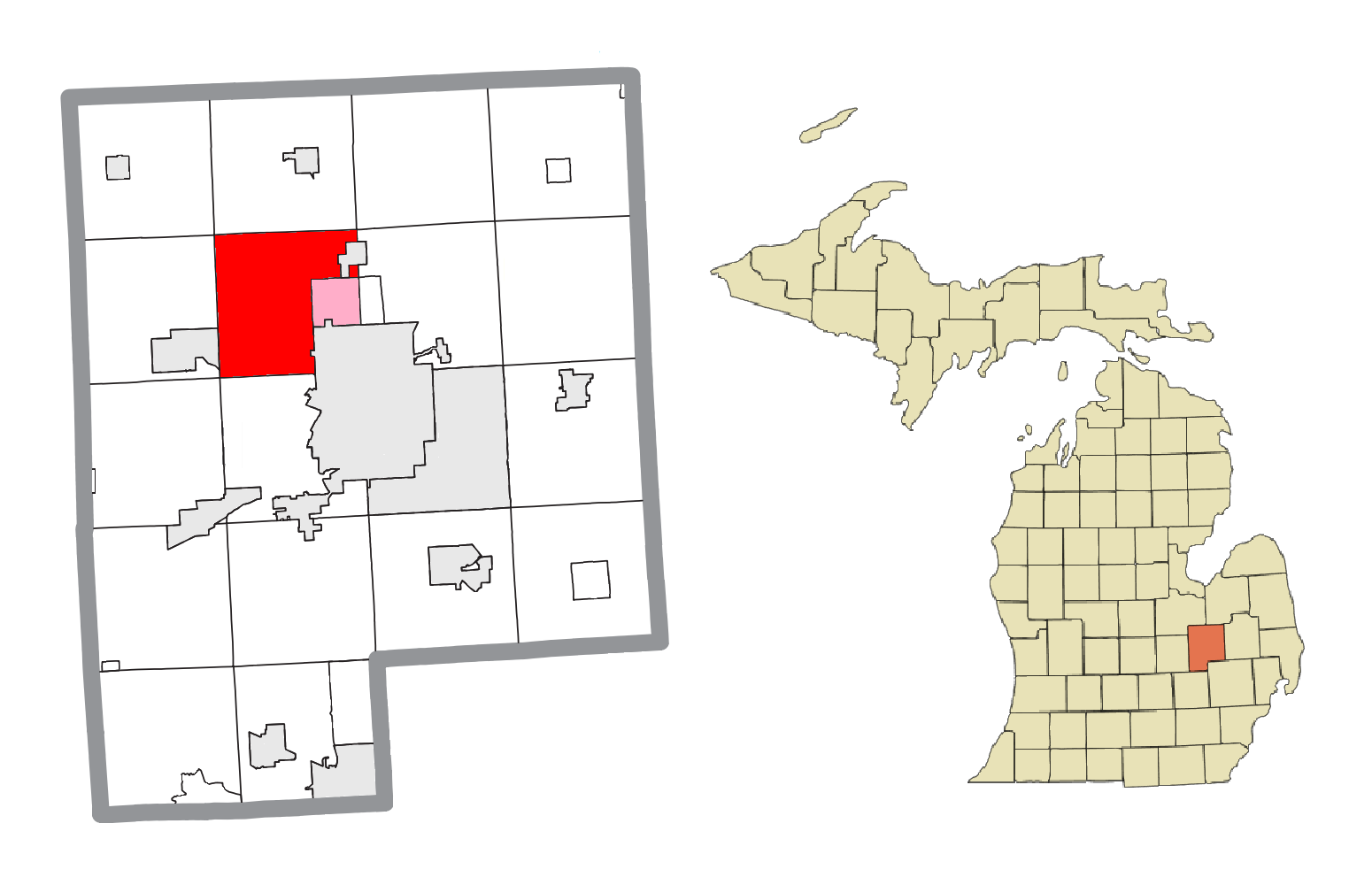
- Location within Genesee County (red) and an administered portion of the Beecher community (pink)

- Location within the state of Michigan
- Coordinates: 43°04′52″N 83°44′26″W
- Country: United States
- State: Michigan
- County: Genesee
- Settled: 1833
- Established: 1855

Government
  - Supervisor: Jolena Sanders-Sims
  - Clerk: Brenda Ashley
  - Treasurer: Gayle Armstrong

Area
  - Total: 31.5 sq mi (81.5 km^{2})
  - Land: 31.4 sq mi (81.4 km^{2})
  - Water: 0.039 sq mi (0.1 km^{2}) 0.13%
- Elevation: 761 ft (232 m)

Population (2020)
  - Total: 20,024
  - Density: 637/sq mi (246/km^{2})
- Time zone: UTC-5 (Eastern)
  - Summer (DST): UTC-4 (Eastern)
- ZIP code(s): 48420 (Clio); 48433 (Flushing); 48458 (Mount Morris); 48504, 48505 (Flint)
- Area code: 810
- FIPS code: 26-55980
- GNIS feature ID: 1626775
- Website: www.mtmorristwp.org

Mount Morris Charter Township is a charter township of Genesee County in the U.S. state of Michigan. The population was 20,024 as of the 2020 census. The city of Mount Morris borders on the east, but the two are administered autonomously.

== Communities ==
- The City of Mount Morris is adjacent to the township, but is governed independently of the township.
- Beecher is an urbanized area of the township lying between the cities of Mount Morris and Flint. There is also a census-designated place with the same name defined for statistical purposes that covers the approximate area of the community. A portion of the CDP also lies within Genesee Township.
- Much of the southeast portion of the township is considered to be a part of the Flint urban area.

== History ==
The Township's survey area was in Grand Blanc Township from 1833 to 1836 when its area was included in Flushing and Genesee townships. The first settler was Benjamin Pearson of Avon, New York, who came in May 1833 to sections 25 and 36. On February 12, 1855, the Township of Mount Morris was established. An election was held in an abandoned log cabin in the southeast corner of the township; 74 votes were cast and the township was organized with elected officials with the main officials being: Ezekiel R. Ewing, supervisor; Bradford P. Foster, town clerk; Samuel R. Farnham, treasurer.

The township garnered national attention when on February 29, 2000, six-year-old Kayla Rolland was killed by her first-grade classmate at Buell Elementary in the Beecher school district.

On Monday, November 27, 2017, the northern Genesee County loop set of municipalities began receiving water from the Karegnondi Water Authority pipeline treated by Genesee County Drain Commission Water and Waste Division.

== Geography ==
According to the United States Census Bureau, the township has a total area of 31.5 square miles (82 km^{2}), of which, 31.4 square miles (81 km^{2}) of it is land and 0.04 square miles (0.10 km^{2}) of it (0.13%) is water.

The township is served by the Flint Mass Transportation Authority bus lines. In addition, I-75, I-475 and M-54 run through the township.

Despite its name, there are no mountains in the township. It was named after Mount Morris, New York on the Genesee River.

== Demographics ==
As of the census of 2000, there were 23,725 people, 8,815 households, and 6,355 families residing in the township. The population density was 754.7 inhabitants per square mile (291.4/km^{2}). There were 9,521 housing units at an average density of 302.9 per square mile (117.0/km^{2}). The racial makeup of the township was 54.54% White, 40.15% African American, 0.62% Native American, 0.26% Asian, 0.04% Pacific Islander, 1.26% from other races, and 3.13% from two or more races. Hispanic or Latino of any race were 3.04% of the population.

There were 8,815 households, out of which 35.2% had children under the age of 18 living with them, 43.6% were married couples living together, 23.0% had a female householder with no husband present, and 27.9% were non-families. 23.5% of all households were made up of individuals, and 8.5% had someone living alone who was 65 years of age or older. The average household size was 2.68 and the average family size was 3.13.

In the township, the population was spread out, with 30.1% under the age of 18, 8.9% from 18 to 24, 27.4% from 25 to 44, 22.0% from 45 to 64, and 11.6% who were 65 years of age or older. The median age was 34 years. For every 100 females, there were 91.5 males. For every 100 females age 18 and over, there were 85.5 males.

The median income for a household in the township was $36,069, and the median income for a family was $38,899. Males had a median income of $35,482 versus $25,886 for females. The per capita income for the township was $17,161. About 14.3% of families and 18.3% of the population were below the poverty line, including 29.3% of those under age 18 and 5.9% of those age 65 or over.

== Government ==
The township receives water from the Karegnondi Water Authority pipeline treated by Genesee County Drain Commission Water and Waste Division except for the Beecher community which is served by the Beecher Metropolitan District. The township is served by Flushing Community Schools, Clio Area School District, Mount Morris Consolidated Schools, Beecher Community School District and Westwood Heights Schools.

== Media ==
The studios and offices of television stations WSMH, WEYI-TV, and WBSF are in a shared building located in the township.

== Highways ==
- Interstate 75 and U.S. 23 concurrently run north and south through the township.
- Interstate 475 runs east and west through the township, but is signed as north and south.
