= M-57 (Michigan highway) =

State highway in Michigan, United States

M-57
- M-57 highlighted in red

Route information
- Maintained by MDOT
- Length: 105.377 mi (169.588 km)
- Existed: 1930–present

Major junctions
- West end: US 131 near Rockford
- M-66 near Sheridan; US 127 in Washington Township; M-52 near Chesaning; M-13 near Montrose; I-75 / US 23 near Clio; M-54 near Clio
- East end: M-15 near Otisville

Location
- Country: United States
- State: Michigan
- Counties: Kent, Montcalm, Gratiot, Saginaw, Genesee

Highway system
- Michigan State Trunkline Highway System; Interstate; US; State; Byways
← M-56	→ M-58

M-57 is an east–west state trunkline highway in the US state of Michigan. The 105.377-mile (169.588 km) highway connects US Highway 131 (US 131) near Rockford on the west end to M-15 near Otisville in the Lower Peninsula. In between, the mostly rural highway passes through farmland and connects several highways and smaller towns together. Three of these highways are freeways: US 131, US 127 and Interstate 75 (I-75). Along the way, between 3,700 and 22,300 vehicles use the highway daily.

The current highway that bears the M-57 moniker is the second to do so. The first is now M-75 in the Northern Lower Peninsula. This second highway was designated in the 1930s along a different, but parallel, routing. The first major changes shifted that routing southward to the current corridor in stages. Through additional extensions and truncations, the modern routing was formed by the 1970s.

== Route description ==
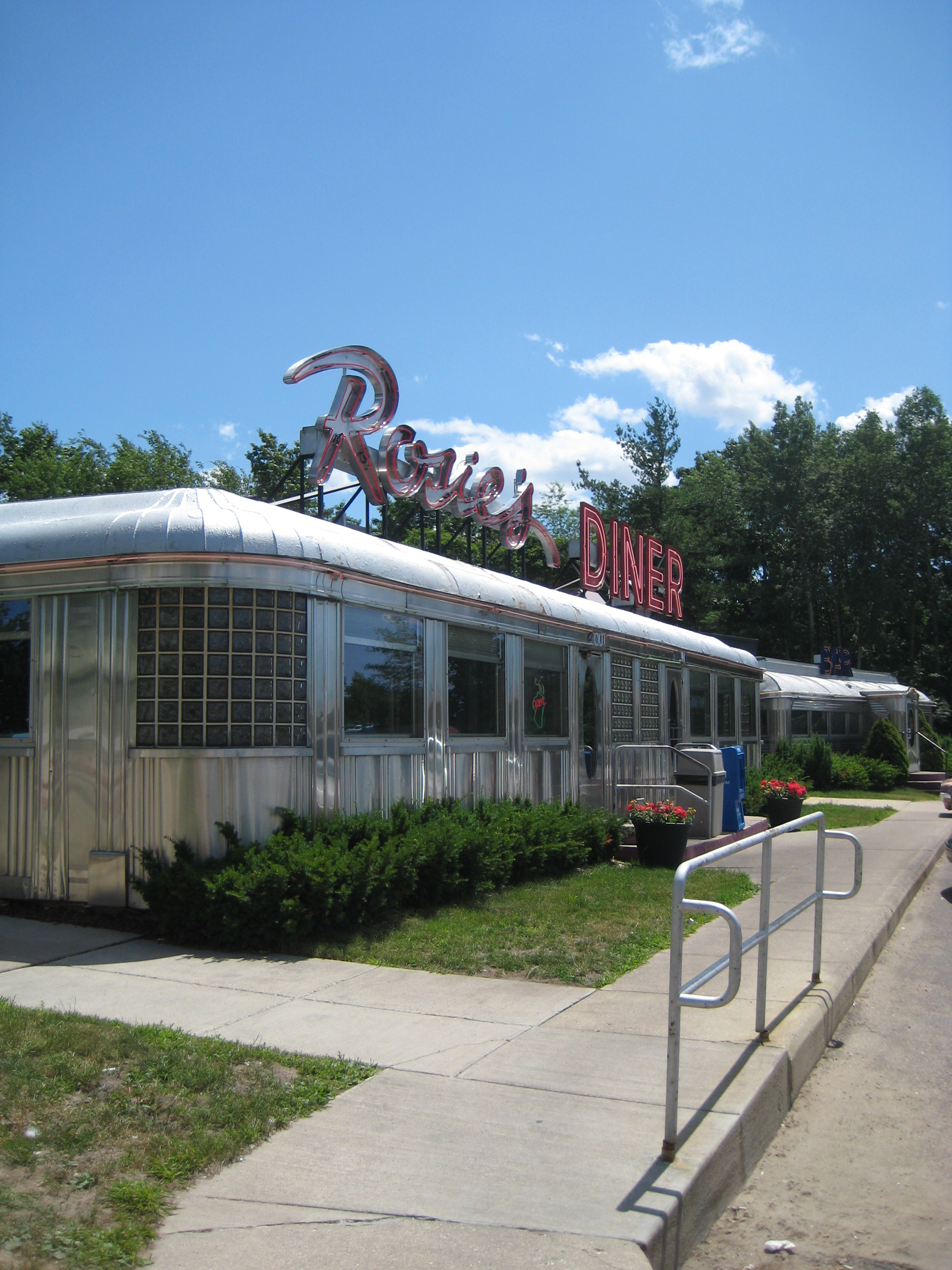
Rosie's Diner in Rockford

M-57 is a rural, two-lane highway crossing the south central Lower Peninsula. The western terminus is at US 131, 14 miles (23 km) north of Grand Rapids near Rockford in northern Kent County. East of the terminus is Rosie's Diner, which is the original shooting location for the Bounty Paper Towel commercials of the 1970s featuring Rosie the Waitress. The diner was moved from Little Ferry, New Jersey to its current location in 1990. From Rockford, M-57 runs east through rural farmland on 14 Mile Road into southern Montcalm County. East of the county line, the highway follows Carson City Road into the outskirts of Greenville. M-57 runs through a retail corridor before becoming Washington Street in town where it meets M-91. Washington Street crosses the Flat River and exits Greenville. Continuing eastward, the trunkline passes through more farmland on Carson City Road. It meets M-66 at a rural four-way intersection before passing into Carson City near the Gratiot county line. M-57 follows Cleveland Road, passing to the south of the communities of Middleton and Perrinton. Near Pompeii, M-57 meets US 127 at a folded diamond interchange along the expressway portion of the latter highway.

Cleveland Road continues east running near Ashley and into Saginaw County. In between Ashley and the county line, the highway crosses a branch of the Great Lakes Central Railroad. M-57 follows Brady Road and crosses M-52 just west of Chesaning. Further east, the trunkline crosses another line of the Great Lakes Central. The highway follows Broad Street into town and over the Shiawassee River. On the east banks, M-57 runs along Main Street south along the river to a junction with Peet Road where it then turns east along the latter road out of town. The highway passes through more farm fields and through Layton Corners on the way to a junction with M-13 on the Saginaw–Genesee county line. At Montrose, M-57 crosses the Flint River, and a line of the Huron and Eastern Railway. Now running along Vienna Road, the trunkline meets I-75/US 23 west of Clio. As it enters town, it crosses a line of the Lake State Railway. This segment of the highway passes through the northernmost suburbs of Flint, and this section is where the heaviest traffic levels along the whole highway are found. As part of its maintenance duties, the Michigan Department of Transportation (MDOT) tracks these traffic levels using a metric known as average annual daily traffic (AADT). This figure is a calculation of the average traffic volume for a segment of roadway on any average day of the year. In 2009, MDOT determined that an average of 22,280 vehicles used the section of M-57 through Clio daily. East of this area, the highway once again passes through rural agricultural lands on the way to its eastern terminus at M-15, one mile (1.6 km) north of Otisville. This terminal section of the trunkline had the lowest traffic levels in 2009 at 3,737 vehicles AADT. No section of M-57 has been listed on the National Highway System, a system of roadways important to the country's economy, defense, and mobility.

== History ==
=== Previous designations ===
In 1919, the Michigan State Highway Department signposted the highway system in the state for the first time. At that time, M-57 designation was originally used in Charlevoix County from Boyne Falls at M-13 (now US 131) through Boyne City and back to then M-13. That highway's number was changed to M-75 in 1926. By the next year, the number was then assigned to a state trunkline that connected between Quinnesec and the Wisconsin state line in the Upper Peninsula. This second iteration was short-lived as it was replaced by an extension of US 141 into Michigan.

=== Current designation ===
In 1930, M-57 was designated from M-66 (now M-91) near Langston to M-47 (now M-52) in St. Charles. By the mid 1936, the section between Ithaca and St. Charles was removed from the state highway system when the designation was shifted south to run between Ashley and Chesaning. In the process, M-57 was run concurrently along US 27 between Ithaca and Ashley. The western section was similarly shifting by May 1938. The new routing started at a junction with US 131 between Rockford and Cedar Springs and continued through Greenville and Carson City to Ashley. The eastern end was also extended from Chesaning to the Clio area. It was extended a second time by early 1941 to a junction with Belsay Road. By the middle of 1946, the eastern end was extended a third time to end in Otisville. M-57 was lengthened after a western extension in late 1948 or early 1949. The highway was routed concurrently with US 131 to Cedar Springs and then west to M-37 at Kent City.

A new routing on the eastern end was designated in late 1956 or early 1957; this routing shifted the eastern terminus out of Otisville to its current location. The last gravel section of highway was paved near Fenmore by the Gratiot–Saginaw county line in the late 1950s. The last change to M-57's routing came in 1973. Then-Congressman Gerald R. Ford opened a section of US 131 freeway on September 21. The freeway ran between the two M-57 junctions along US 131 near Rockford and Cedar Springs. Afterwards, M-57 was truncated to the Rockford area, and the segment previously part of M-57 between Kent City and Cedar Springs was made part of M-46 afterwards.

== Major intersections ==
County	Location	mi	km	Destinations	Notes
Kent	Algoma Township	0.000	0.000	US 131 – Grand Rapids, Cadillac B-72 west – Sparta	Exit 101 on US 131; 14 Mile Road continues west as B-72
Montcalm	Greenville	16.620	26.747	M-91 – Lakeview, Belding	
Montcalm	Fairplain Township – Bushnell Township	26.041	41.909	M-66 – Stanton, Ionia	
Gratiot	Washington Township	51.811	83.382	US 127 – Clare, Lansing	Exit 109 on US 127
Saginaw	Brady Township – Chesaning Township	71.868	115.660	M-52 – Saginaw, Owosso	
Saginaw– Genesee	Maple Grove Township – Montrose Township	84.629	136.197	M-13 – Saginaw, Lennon	M-13 runs along the county line
Genesee	Vienna Township	92.807	149.358	I-75 / US 23 – Saginaw, Flint	Exit 131 on I-75
Genesee	Vienna Township	95.534	153.747	M-54 – Frankenmuth, Flint, Birch Run	
Genesee	Forest Township	105.377	169.588	M-15 – Vassar, Otisville, Millington	
1.000 mi = 1.609 km; 1.000 km = 0.621 mi
