= Richfield Township, Genesee County, Michigan =

Richfield Township, Michigan
- Civil township
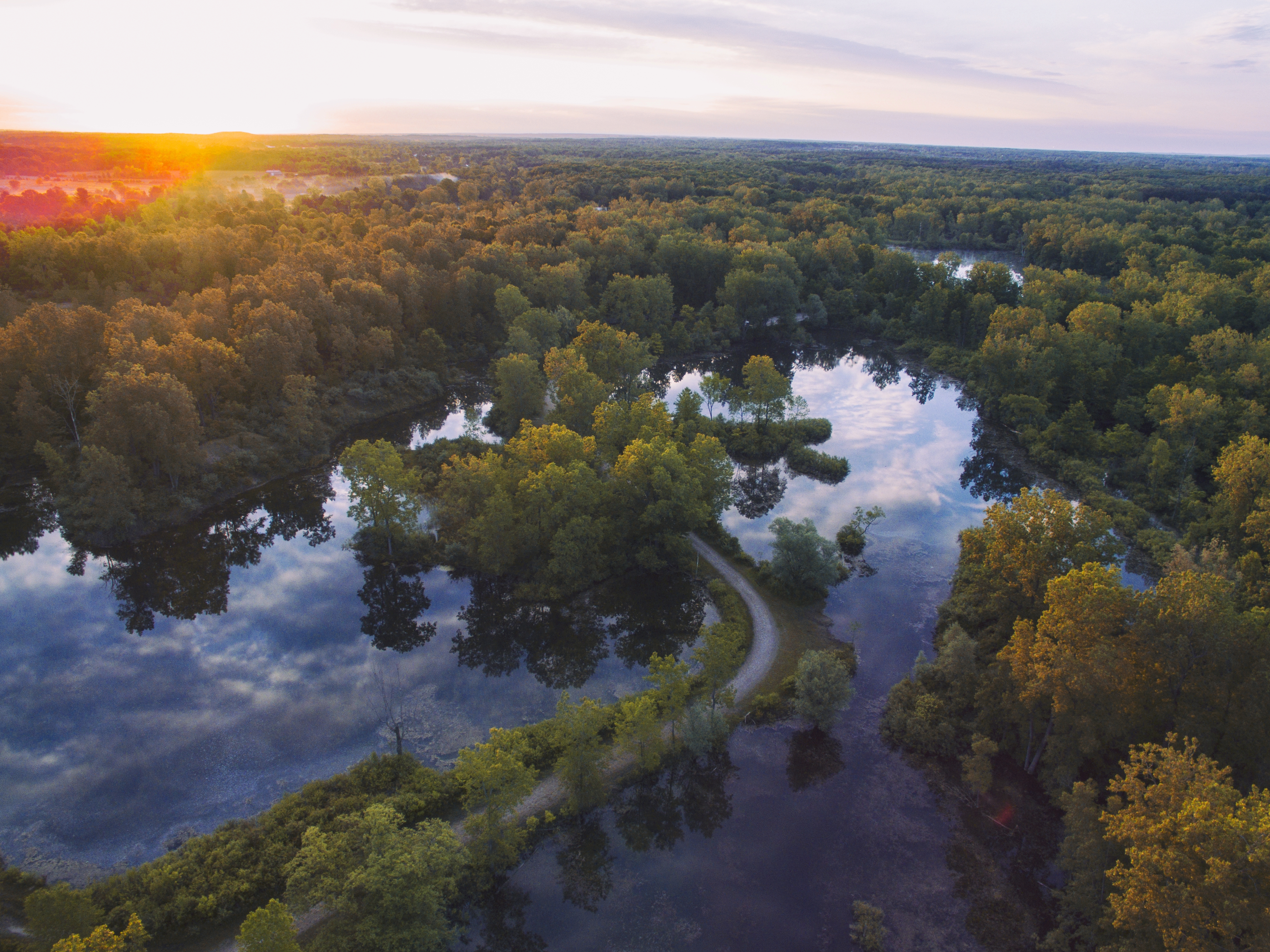
- Aerial view from Fishing Access Road

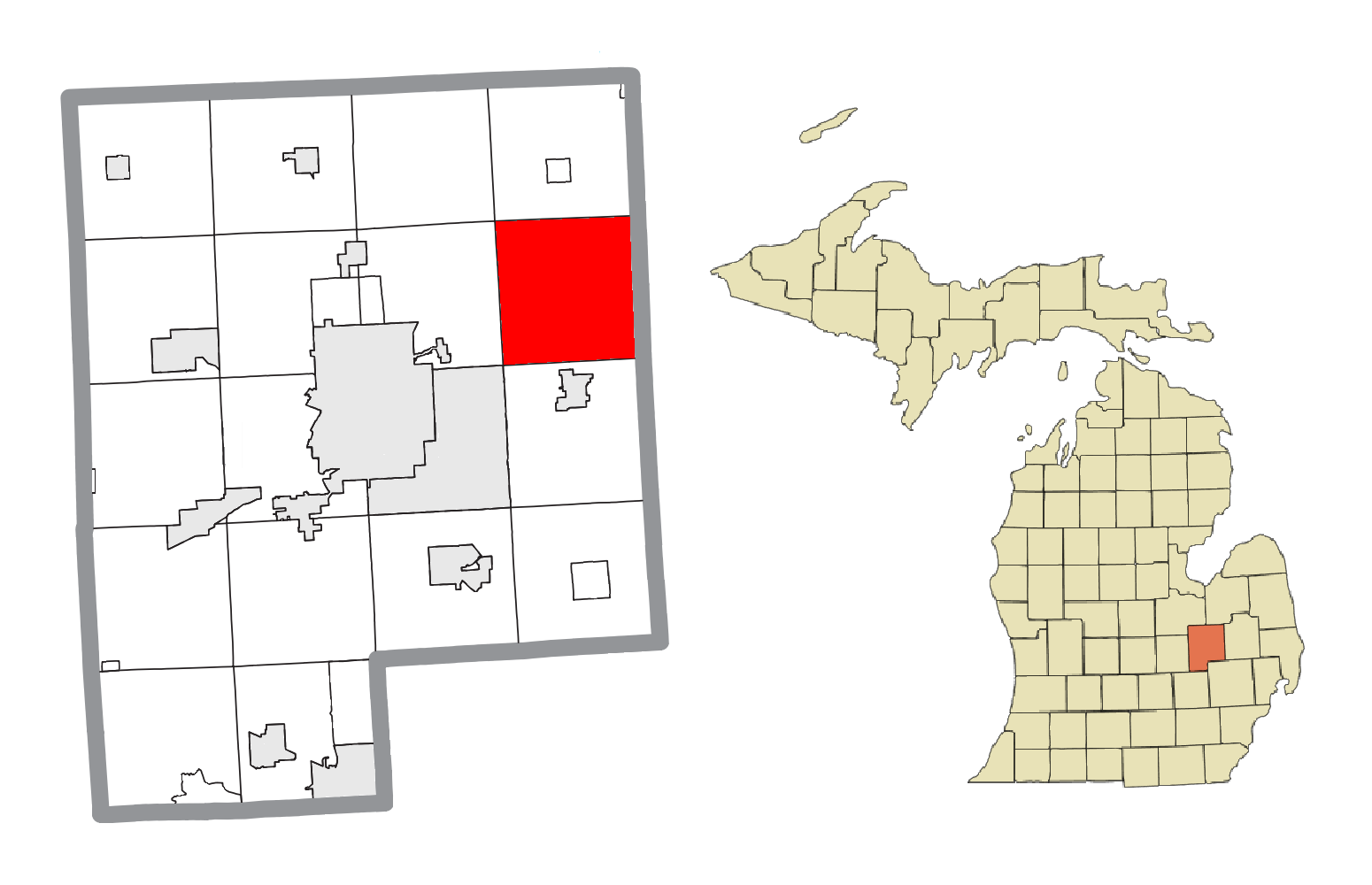
- Location within Genesee County

- Location within the state of Michigan Richfield Township (the United States)
- Coordinates: 43°05′26″N 83°31′36″W
- Country: United States
- State: Michigan
- County: Genesee
- Settled: 1836
- Organized: 1837

Government
  - Supervisor: Joseph M. Madore
  - Clerk: Cheryl Campbell-Hoberg
  - Treasurer: Brian Arnes

Area
  - Total: 36.4 sq mi (94.2 km^{2})
  - Land: 35.3 sq mi (91.4 km^{2})
  - Water: 1.1 sq mi (2.8 km^{2}) 2.94%
- Elevation: 778 ft (237 m)

Population (2020)
  - Total: 8,991
  - Density: 255/sq mi (98.4/km^{2})
- Time zone: UTC-5 (EST)
  - Summer (DST): UTC-4 (EDT)
- ZIP code(s): 48423 (Davison); 48458 (Mount Morris)
- Area code: 810
- FIPS code: 26-68180
- GNIS feature ID: 1626968
- Website: www.richfieldtwp.org

Richfield Township is a civil township of Genesee County in the U.S. state of Michigan. The population was 8,991 at the 2020 census, up from 8,730 at the 2010 census.

== Communities ==
- Richfield Center is a small unincorporated community within the township at M-15 and Coldwater Road.
- Rogersville is a small unincorporated community within the township on Mt. Morris Road east of Vassar Road on the border with Genesee Township.
- Russellville is a small unincorporated community within the township at Coldwater Road and Irish Road.

== History ==
On Monday November 27, 2017, the northern loop set of municipalities, including Richfield, began receiving water from the Karegnondi Water Authority pipeline and treated by Genesee County Drain Commission Water and Waste Division.

== Geography ==
According to the United States Census Bureau, the township has a total area of 36.4 square miles (94.2 km^{2}), of which 35.3 square miles (91.4 km^{2}) is land and 1.1 square miles (2.8 km^{2}) (2.94%) is water.

== Demographics ==
As of the census of 2000, there were 8,170 people, 2,967 households, and 2,358 families residing in the township. The population density was 231.4 inhabitants per square mile (89.3/km^{2}). There were 3,125 housing units at an average density of 88.5 per square mile (34.2/km^{2}). The racial makeup of the township was 94.53% White, 2.46% African American, 0.48% Native American, 0.21% Asian, 0.43% from other races, and 1.90% from two or more races. Hispanic or Latino of any race were 1.57% of the population.

There were 2,967 households, out of which 36.7% had children under the age of 18 living with them, 65.4% were married couples living together, 9.7% had a female householder with no husband present, and 20.5% were non-families. 16.4% of all households were made up of individuals, and 5.2% had someone living alone who was 65 years of age or older. The average household size was 2.75 and the average family size was 3.07.

In the township the population was spread out, with 26.5% under the age of 18, 8.2% from 18 to 24, 29.7% from 25 to 44, 26.2% from 45 to 64, and 9.4% who were 65 years of age or older. The median age was 37 years. For every 100 females, there were 98.5 males. For every 100 females age 18 and over, there were 96.3 males.

The median income for a household in the township was $51,265, and the median income for a family was $58,467. Males had a median income of $42,538 versus $30,202 for females. The per capita income for the township was $21,177. About 4.3% of families and 5.3% of the population were below the poverty line, including 8.1% of those under age 18 and 4.2% of those age 65 or over.

== Government ==
The township receives water from the Karegnondi Water Authority pipeline treated by Genesee County Drain Commission Water and Waste Division.

Genesee Township is part of the following:

- Genesee County Commissioner Districts 9
- Michigan House of Representatives District 48
- State Senate District 27
- 67th District Court Division 2
- Michigan's 5th Congressional District
- Genesee District Library

Educational services are primarily provided by Davison Community Schools and LakeVille Community Schools while small parts of the township are served by Kearsley Community Schools and Mt. Morris Consolidated Schools (Rogersville area).
