= Mount Morris Consolidated Schools =

School district in Michigan

Address
- 12356 Walter St. Mount Morris, Michigan, Genesee, Michigan, 48458; United States

District information
- Type: Public school district
- Grades: Prekindergarten-12
- Superintendent: Mickie Kujat
- Schools: 9
- Budget: $29,515,000 2022-2023 total expenditures
- NCES District ID: 2624720

Students and staff
- Students: 1,446 (2024-2025)
- Teachers: 78.05 FTE (2024-2025)
- Staff: 216.49 FTE (2024-2025)
- Student–teacher ratio: 18.53 (2024-2025)

Other information
- Website: www.mtmorrisschools.org

Mount Morris Consolidated School District is a public school district in Genesee County in the U.S. state of Michigan and in the Genesee Intermediate School District. It serves the city of Mt. Morris and parts of Genesee Township, Mt. Morris Township, Richfield Township, Thetford Township, and Vienna Township.

== Schools ==
School	Address	Notes
Pinehurst Early Elementary	1013 Pinehurst Blvd., Mt. Morris	Pre-K to 1st grade
Moore Elementary	1201 Wisner St., Mt. Morris	Grades 2-3
Montague Elementary	344 Mt. Morris St., Mt. Morris	Grades 4-5
Mt. Morris Middle School	12356 Walter St., Mt. Morris	Grades 6-8
Elisabeth Ann Johnson Memorial High School	8041 Neff Rd., Mt. Morris	Grades 9-12
Mt. Morris Education and Community Center	1000 E Mt. Morris Rd., Mt. Morris	--

== High school ==
Elisabeth Ann Johnson Memorial High School

Location
- 8041 Neff Road; Mt. Morris, Michigan; United States

Information
- Type: High School
- Motto: "Learning for a Lifetime"
- School district: Mt. Morris Consolidated Schools
- Principal: Nicholas Carr
- Grades: 9th-12th grade
- Enrollment: 438
- Colors: Navy Blue and White
- Athletics: Football, Cheerleading, Baseball, Softball, Wrestling, Volleyball, Boys Basketball, Girls Basketball, Boys Bowling, Girls Bowling, Boys Golf, Boys Track, Girls Track, Girls Tennis, Girls Soccer, and Co-ed Cross Country
- Mascot: Black Panther
- Nickname: Panthers

Mount Morris' high school is called Elisabeth Ann Johnson Memorial High School. Prior to the present high school opening, it was known simply as Mount Morris High School. Two failed funding millages delayed the opening of the high school, although the building was complete by April 1970. The architect was Sedgewick and Sellers of Flint. The previous high school, which had opened in fall 1958, became the middle school.
