= M-56 (Michigan highway) =

M-56 was the designation given to two former state trunkline highways in the U.S. state of Michigan:

- M-56 (1919–1957 Michigan highway) from Monroe to Flat Rock
- M-56 (1971–1987 Michigan highway) in Flint

Browse numbered routes
| ← M-55 | M-56 | → M-57 |
