= Birch Run Area Schools =

School district in Michigan

Address
- 12450 Church St Suite 2 Birch Run, Michigan, Saginaw, Michigan, 48415; United States
- Coordinates: 43.24424°N 83.79615°W

District information
- Type: Public
- Grades: Pre-kindergarten through 12
- Established: 1954
- Superintendent: Diane Martindale
- Schools: Elementary 1 Middle 1 High 2
- Budget: US$23,835,000 (2022-2023 expeditures)
- NCES District ID: 2605820

Students and staff
- Students: 1,806 (2024-2025)
- Teachers: 98.62 FTE (2024-2025)
- Staff: 257.17 FTE (2024-2025)
- Student–teacher ratio: 18.31 (2024-2025)
- Athletic conference: Tri-Valley Conference
- District mascot: Panthers
- Colors: Blue and Gold

Other information
- Website: www.birchrunschools.org

Birch Run Area Schools is a school district headquartered in Birch Run, Michigan. It is a part of the Saginaw Intermediate School District and serves the Birch Run area, including the village of Birch Run, Taymouth Township, part of Vienna Township and all but the northeastern sections of Birch Run Township.

== History ==
The first graduating class from Birch Run High School was in 1924. In 1939, an addition to the Birch Run school, built by the Works Progress Administration, was opened. It was not damaged when, in 1941, the original school burned down. The burned section was replaced by a one-story wing in 1943. These structures still exist on the southeast end of the high school. In 1954, voters approved the consolidation of 6 of the township's fractional school districts into the Birch Run Area Schools district, and passed a bond issue for a new addition to the high school. The addition was designed by Finnish architect Suhlo Alexander Nurmi.

The district's dedicated elementary school opened in 1958. The high school was renovated and expanded in 2001.

== Schools ==
List of Schools
School	Address	Enrollment 2023-2024	Notes
Birch Run High School	12450 Church St.	531	Grades 9-12
Marshall Green Middle School	8225 Main St.	535	Grades 5-8
North Elementary School	12440 Church St.	681	Grades PreK-4
Progressive High School	12450 Church St.	29	Grades 9-12
