= Birch Run Township, Michigan =

- Civil township
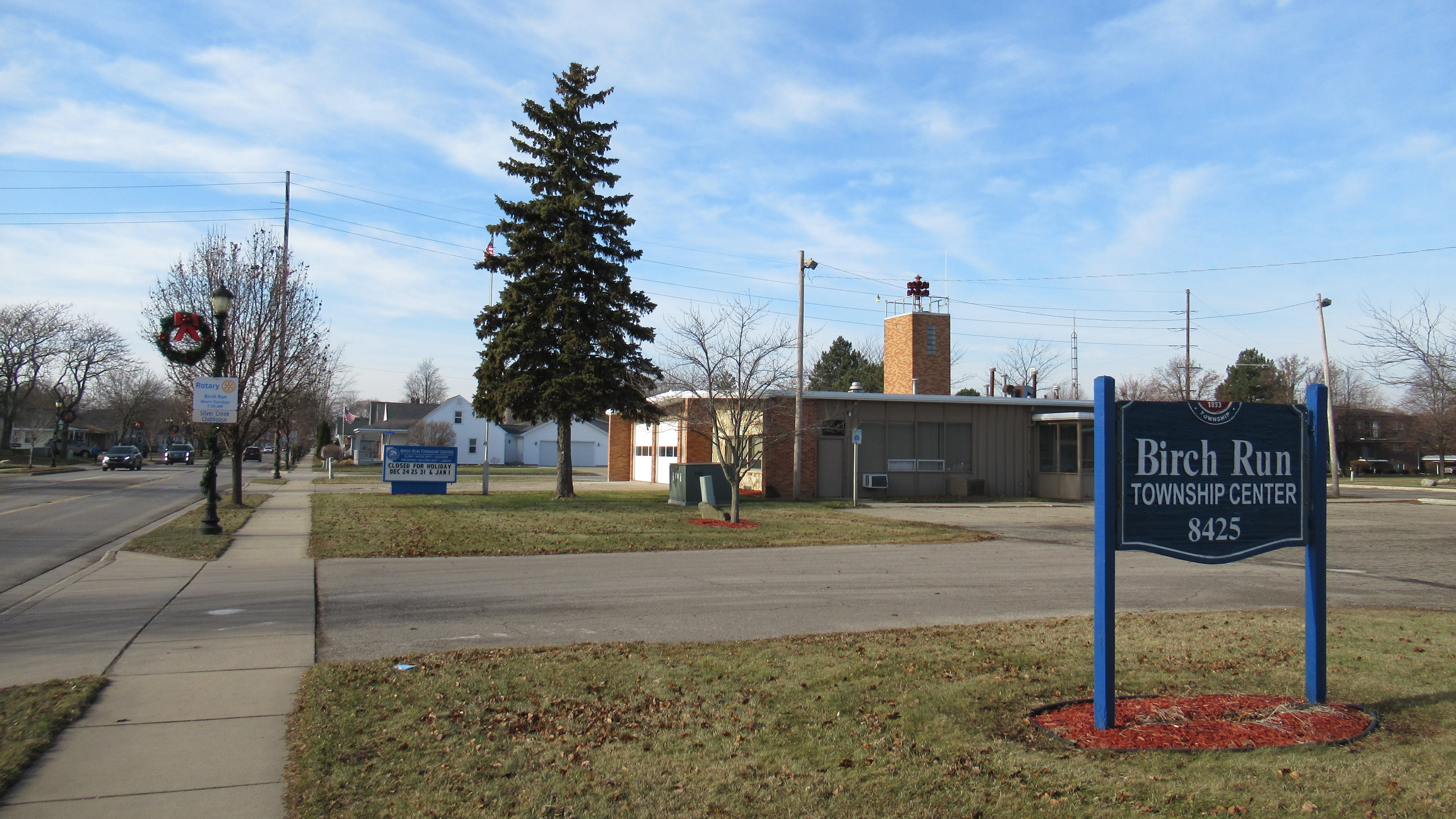
- Birch Run Township Center

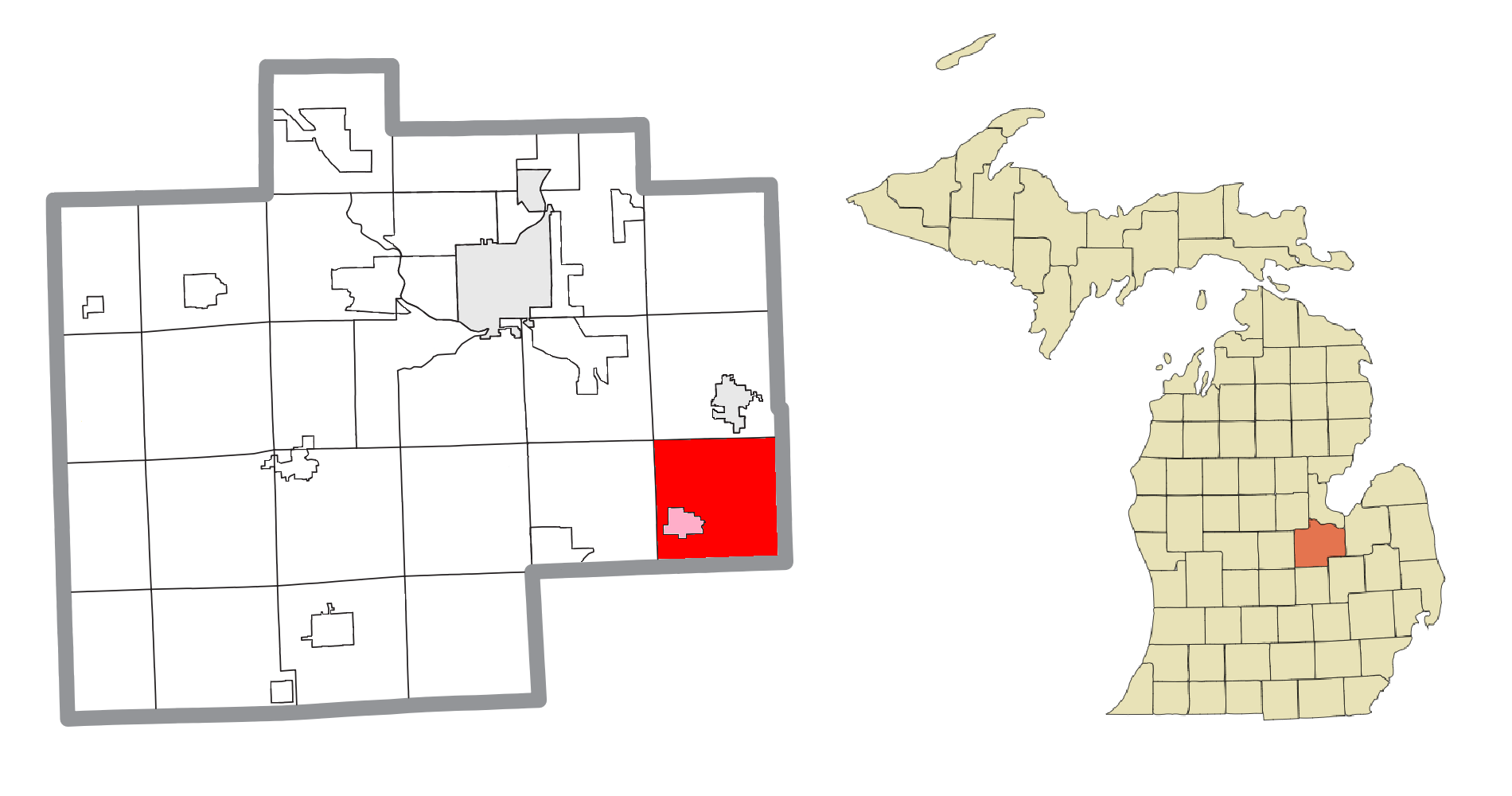
- Location within Saginaw County (red) and the administered village of Birch Run (pink)

- Location within the state of Michigan Birch Run Township (the United States)
- Coordinates: 43°15′25″N 83°46′16″W
- Country: United States
- State: Michigan
- County: Saginaw
- Established: 1853

Government
  - Supervisor: Ray Letterman
  - Clerk: Corey Trinklein
  - Treasurer: Karen Parlberg

Area
  - Total: 35.6 sq mi (92.2 km^{2})
  - Land: 35.6 sq mi (92.2 km^{2})
  - Water: 0 sq mi (0.0 km^{2})
- Elevation: 633 ft (193 m)

Population (2020)
  - Total: 5,888
  - Density: 165/sq mi (63.9/km^{2})
- Time zone: UTC-5 (Eastern (EST))
  - Summer (DST): UTC-4 (EDT)
- ZIP code(s): 48415 (Birch Run); 48722 (Bridgeport)
- Area code: 989
- FIPS code: 26-08560
- GNIS feature ID: 1625940
- Website: Official website

Birch Run Township is a civil township of Saginaw County in the U.S. state of Michigan. As of the 2020 Census, the township population was 5,888. The village of Birch Run is located within the township.

== History ==
Birth Run Township was established in 1853. Joseph Matheson was elected the first supervisor with 18 votes to 17 for Proctor Williams, at whose house the initial election was held.

On July 7, 1870, a U.S. Post Office opened at the county line with Genesee County on the north side of Wilard Road at the rail tracks as Hughesville. On February 17, 1875, Hughesville Post Office was renamed County Line. In 1885, County Line was renamed to Countyline. The Countyline Post Office was closed on Oct 14, 1904.

== Geography ==
According to the United States Census Bureau, the township has a total area of 35.6 square miles (92 km^{2}), all land.

== Demographics ==
As of the census of 2000, there were 6,191 people, 2,327 households, and 1,780 families residing in the township. The population density was 173.9 inhabitants per square mile (67.1/km^{2}). There were 2,414 housing units at an average density of 67.8 per square mile (26.2/km^{2}). The racial makeup of the township was 96.96% White, 0.48% African American, 0.39% Native American, 0.19% Asian, 0.60% from other races, and 1.37% from two or more races. Hispanic or Latino of any race were 2.18% of the population.

There were 2,327 households, out of which 36.4% had children under the age of 18 living with them, 63.6% were married couples living together, 9.5% had a female householder with no husband present, and 23.5% were non-families. 19.9% of all households were made up of individuals, and 7.7% had someone living alone who was 65 years of age or older. The average household size was 2.65 and the average family size was 3.05.

In the township the population was spread out, with 27.1% under the age of 18, 7.3% from 18 to 24, 30.6% from 25 to 44, 23.5% from 45 to 64, and 11.4% who were 65 years of age or older. The median age was 36 years. For every 100 females, there were 97.0 males. For every 100 females age 18 and over, there were 92.9 males.

The median income for a household in the township was $47,538, and the median income for a family was $54,149. Males had a median income of $41,947 versus $26,781 for females. The per capita income for the township was $20,984. About 4.1% of families and 4.9% of the population were below the poverty line, including 5.4% of those under age 18 and 2.5% of those age 65 or over.

== Education ==
The Birch Run Area School District serves the village of Birch Run, the majority of Birch Run Township and Taymouth Township. The remainder of Birch Run Township, approximately 8.5 square miles, is served by the Frankenmuth School District. Roughly a third square mile is covered by the Clio Area School District.

Birch Run's athletic teams are nicknamed the Panthers.
