= Birch Run Premium Outlets =

Outlet mall in Birch Run, Michigan, United States

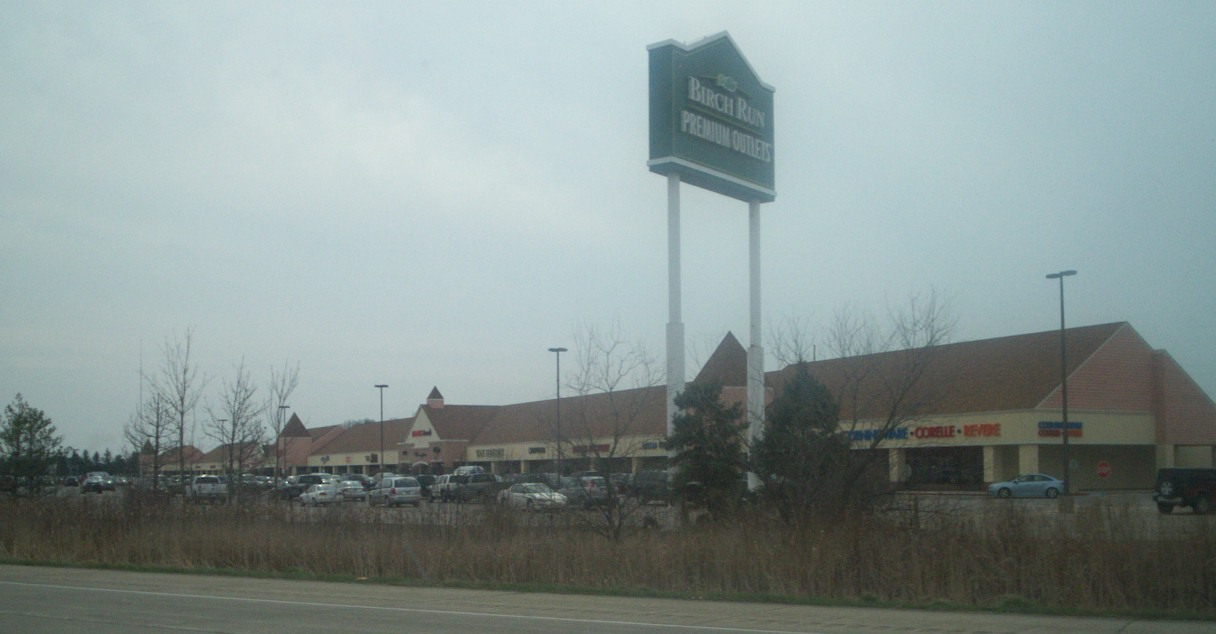
- Birch Run Premium Outlets as seen from Interstate 75
- Location: Birch Run, Michigan
- Coordinates: 43.247°N 83.778°W
- Address: 12240 South Beyer Road
- Opened: 1986
- Developer: Horizon Outlets
- Manager: Simon's Premium Outlets
- Owner: Simon Property Group
- Num. of stores: 89
- Floor area: 690,000 sq ft (64,000 m^{2})
- Floors: 1
- Website: www.premiumoutlets.com

Birch Run Premium Outlets is an outlet mall in Birch Run, Michigan. The largest outlet mall in the Midwestern United States, it opened in 1986. It is managed by Premium Outlets, a division of Simon Property Group. The Birch Run Premium Outlets are located approximately halfway between Saginaw and Flint.

== History ==
The mall was built in 1986 as Manufacturer's Marketplace/Prime Outlets at Birch Run. In 2010, the mall was bought by Simon Property Group's Premium Outlet division and renamed Birch Run Premium Outlets.

The mall's busiest months are August and December, the former due to back-to-school shopping and vacationing travelers. For many years, Birch Run Premium Outlets were the largest outlet mall in the Midwestern United States.
