= Otisville, Michigan =

- Village
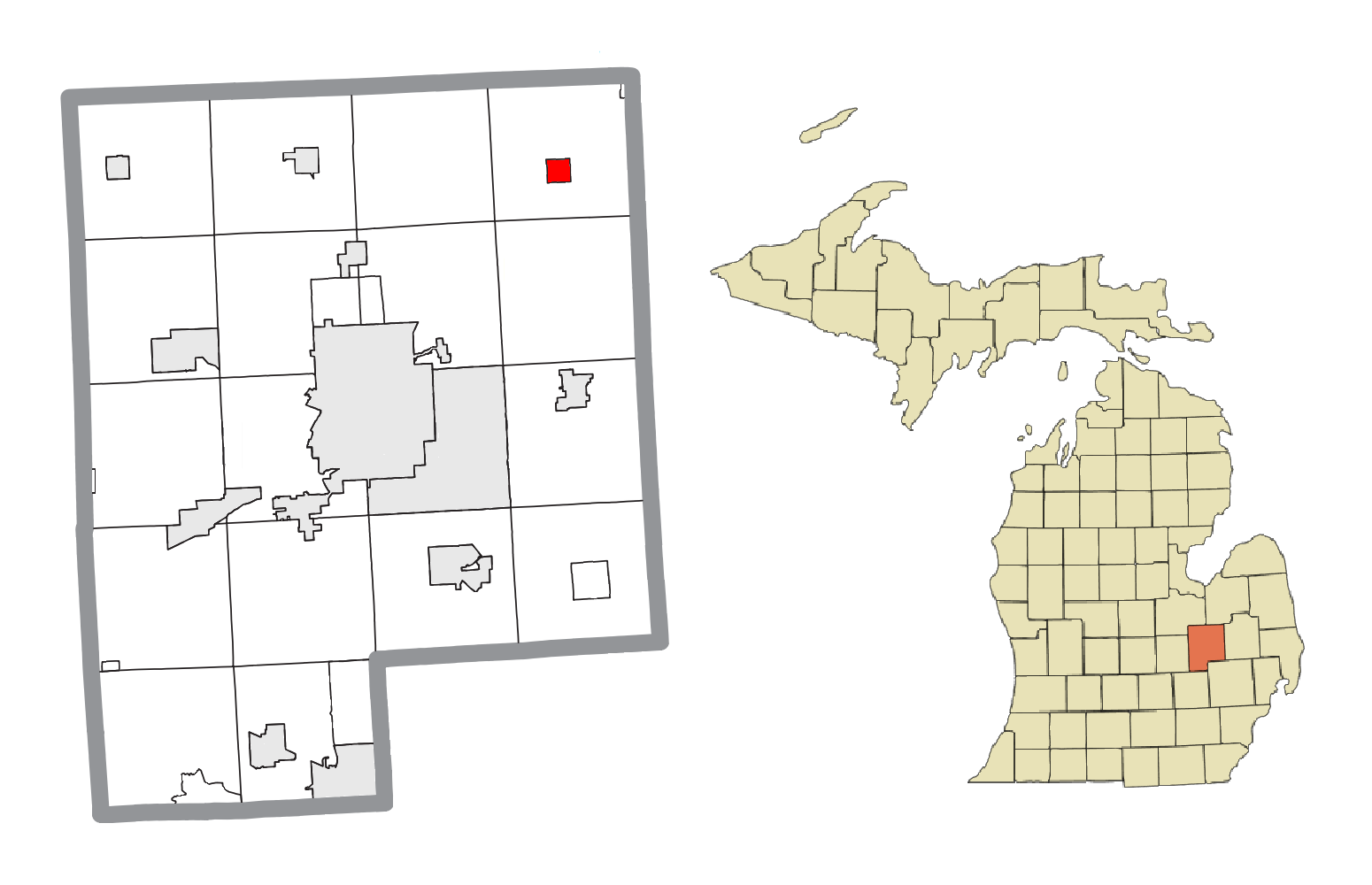
- Location within Genesee County

- Location within the state of Michigan
- Coordinates: 43°09′55″N 83°31′27″W
- Country: United States
- State: Michigan
- County: Genesee
- Township: Forest
- Settled: 1836
- Platted: 1863
- Incorporated: 1877

Government
  - Type: Village council
  - President: Jeffrey Lutze
  - Clerk: Lisa Adolph

Area
  - Total: 0.97 sq mi (2.52 km^{2})
  - Land: 0.88 sq mi (2.28 km^{2})
  - Water: 0.093 sq mi (0.24 km^{2}) 9.28%
- Elevation: 814 ft (248 m)

Population (2020)
  - Total: 819
  - Density: 929.7/sq mi (358.97/km^{2})
- Time zone: UTC-5 (EST)
  - Summer (DST): UTC-4 (EDT)
- ZIP code(s): 48463
- Area code: 810
- FIPS code: 26-61600
- GNIS feature ID: 0634154
- Website: otisvillevillage.org

Otisville is a village in Forest Township, Genesee County in the U.S. state of Michigan. As of the 2020 census, Otisville had a population of 819. It is located along M-15, just south of M-57. It is part of the Flint metropolitan area.

== History ==
The first land entry for the Forest (after the heavy growth of trees) community was made in March 1836 by James Seymour. The first settlers, Henry Heister and family, came in 1837. The township was organized in 1837, with the second settler, Nathaniel Smith, elected supervisor. In 1851, a sawmill was built by John Hayes, who sold the mill to Francis Otis the next year. On February 14, 1855, the post office opened with postmaster John Crawford. On April 5, 1861, the post office was renamed to Otisville. The village was platted by William F. Otis and T.D. Crocker in 1863. In 1874, a station opened by the Pere Marquette Railway in the village.

The Village of Otisville was incorporated in 1877.

== Geography ==
According to the United States Census Bureau, the village has a total area of 0.97 square miles (2.51 km^{2}), of which 0.88 square miles (2.28 km^{2}) is land and 0.09 square miles (0.23 km^{2}) is water.

== Demographics ==
Historical population
Census	Pop.	Note	%±
1880	349		—
1890	277		−20.6%
1900	291		5.1%
1910	312		7.2%
1920	364		16.7%
1930	450		23.6%
1940	534		18.7%
1950	592		10.9%
1960	701		18.4%
1970	724		3.3%
1980	682		−5.8%
1990	724		6.2%
2000	882		21.8%
2010	864		−2.0%
2020	819		−5.2%
U.S. Decennial Census

=== 2010 census ===
As of the census of 2010, there were 864 people, 342 households, and 225 families living in the village. The population density was 981.8 inhabitants per square mile (379.1/km^{2}). There were 379 housing units at an average density of 430.7 per square mile (166.3/km^{2}). The racial makeup of the village was 97.8% White, 0.5% African American, 0.5% Native American, 0.1% Asian, 0.1% from other races, and 1.0% from two or more races. Hispanic or Latino of any race were 1.2% of the population.

There were 342 households, of which 36.3% had children under the age of 18 living with them, 46.2% were married couples living together, 13.5% had a female householder with no husband present, 6.1% had a male householder with no wife present, and 34.2% were non-families. 30.4% of all households were made up of individuals, and 10.8% had someone living alone who was 65 years of age or older. The average household size was 2.53 and the average family size was 3.09.

The median age in the village was 36.9 years. 27.3% of residents were under the age of 18; 7.7% were between the ages of 18 and 24; 24.5% were from 25 to 44; 27.4% were from 45 to 64, and 13.2% were 65 years of age or older. The gender makeup of the village was 49.7% male and 50.3% female.

=== 2000 census ===
As of the census of 2000, there were 882 people, 343 households, and 244 families living in the village. The population density was 999.1 inhabitants per square mile (385.8/km^{2}). There were 369 housing units at an average density of 418.0 per square mile (161.4/km^{2}). The racial makeup of the village was 96.15% White, 1.02% African American, 0.45% Native American, 0.11% Pacific Islander, 0.57% from other races, and 1.70% from two or more races. Hispanic or Latino of any race were 1.59% of the population.

There were 343 households, out of which 38.5% had children under the age of 18 living with them, 51.9% were married couples living together, 14.3% had a female householder with no husband present, and 28.6% were non-families. 23.9% of all households were made up of individuals, and 9.0% had someone living alone who was 65 years of age or older. The average household size was 2.57 and the average family size was 2.99.

In the village, the population was spread out, with 27.4% under the age of 18, 10.9% from 18 to 24, 32.3% from 25 to 44, 19.8% from 45 to 64, and 9.5% who were 65 years of age or older. The median age was 32 years. For every 100 females, there were 92.2 males. For every 100 females age 18 and over, there were 86.0 males.

The median income for a household in the village was $40,341, and the median income for a family was $45,769. Males had a median income of $44,167 versus $21,083 for females. The per capita income for the village was $17,540. About 3.4% of families and 6.0% of the population were below the poverty line, including 3.7% of those under age 18 and 12.9% of those age 65 or over.
