= Birch Run, Michigan =

- Village
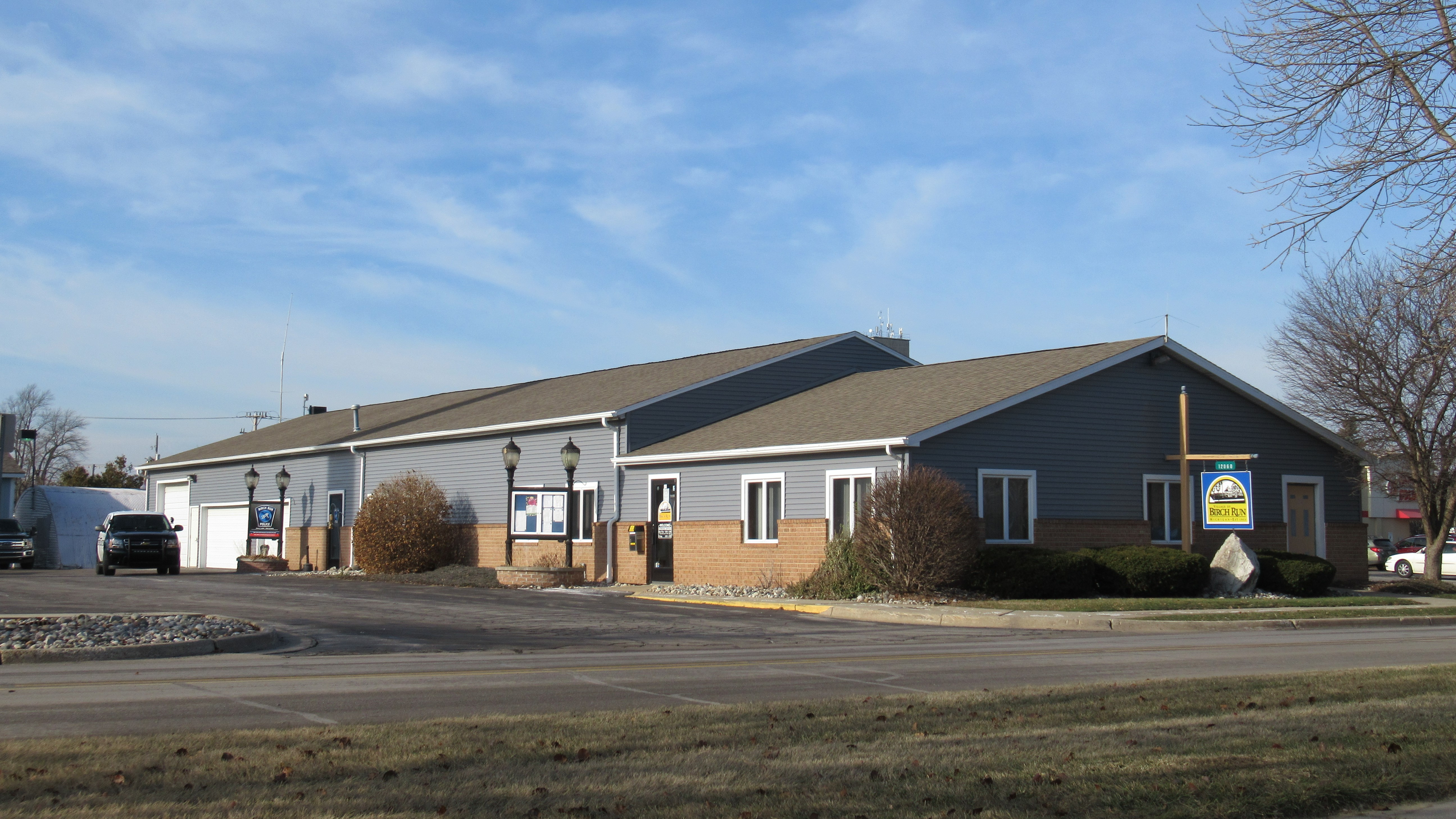
- Birch Run village offices

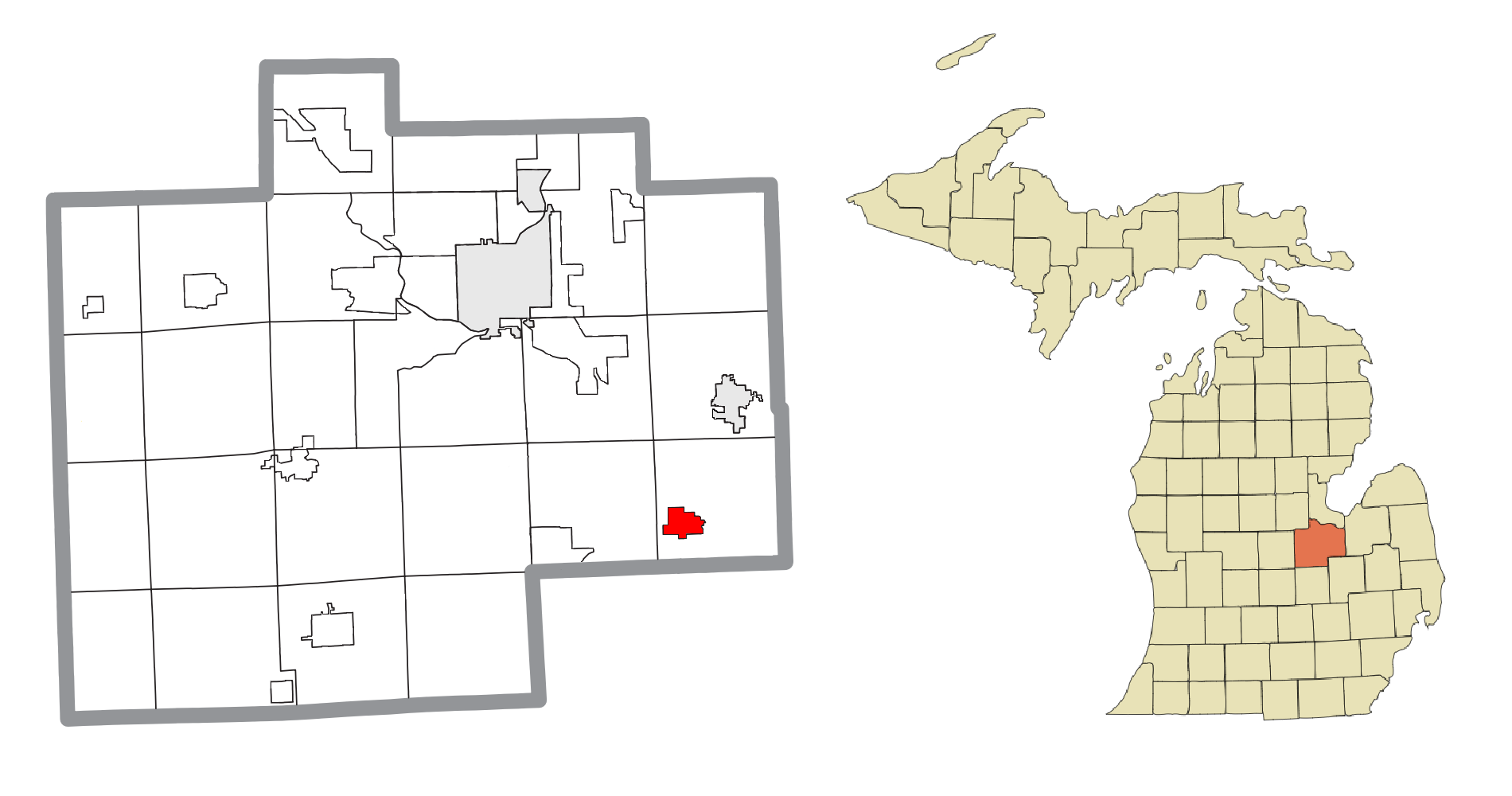
- Location within Saginaw County

- Location within the state of Michigan
- Coordinates: 43°15′01″N 83°47′28″W
- Country: United States
- State: Michigan
- County: Saginaw
- Township: Birch Run
- Founded: 1852
- Incorporated: 1955

Government
  - Type: Village council
  - President: Marianne Nelson

Area
  - Total: 1.90 sq mi (4.93 km^{2})
  - Land: 1.88 sq mi (4.88 km^{2})
  - Water: 0.019 sq mi (0.05 km^{2})
- Elevation: 633 ft (193 m)

Population (2020)
  - Total: 1,525
  - Density: 809.7/sq mi (312.64/km^{2})
- Time zone: UTC-5 (Eastern (EST))
  - Summer (DST): UTC-4 (EDT)
- ZIP code(s): 48415
- Area code: 989
- FIPS code: 26-08540
- GNIS feature ID: 2398124
- Website: Official website

Birch Run is a village in Saginaw County in the U.S. state of Michigan. As of the 2020 census, Birch Run had a population of 1,525. The village is located within Birch Run Township.

== History ==
Birch Run was established in 1852 as a station on the Pere Marquette Railroad. It was given a post office in 1954. In 1954, it was incorporated as a village.

Birch Run was founded as a station on the Pere Marquette Railroad by John Moore, its first postmaster, in 1852. It was named after its creek, which runs through a large birch area. In 1863, the town was renamed Deer Lick and remained so until 1868 when it reverted to Birch Run. Birch Run was incorporated as a village in 1955.

Birch Run was the home of the Great Lakes Storm, a defunct member of the Continental Basketball Association. The Storm played in the Birch Run Expo Center from 2001 until they disbanded in 2005.

== Places of interest ==
Birch Run Premium Outlets, opened in 1986, is the largest outlet mall in the Midwest. As of November 2017, the mall has 108 stores and 3 restaurants on property.

== Education ==
The Birch Run Area School District serves the village of Birch Run, Birch Run Township and Taymouth Township.

Birch Run's athletic teams are known as the Panthers.

== Geography ==
According to the United States Census Bureau, the village has a total area of 1.91 square miles (4.95 km^{2}), of which 1.89 square miles (4.90 km^{2}) is land and 0.02 square miles (0.05 km^{2}) is water.

== Demographics ==
Historical population
Census	Pop.	Note	%±
1960	844		—
1970	932		10.4%
1980	1,196		28.3%
1990	992		−17.1%
2000	1,653		66.6%
2010	1,555		−5.9%
2020	1,525		−1.9%
U.S. Decennial Census

=== 2020 census ===
As of the 2020 census, Birch Run had a population of 1,525. The median age was 38.8 years. 20.5% of residents were under the age of 18 and 18.0% of residents were 65 years of age or older. For every 100 females there were 97.5 males, and for every 100 females age 18 and over there were 89.7 males age 18 and over.

0.0% of residents lived in urban areas, while 100.0% lived in rural areas.

There were 690 households in Birch Run, of which 29.0% had children under the age of 18 living in them. Of all households, 36.7% were married-couple households, 21.3% were households with a male householder and no spouse or partner present, and 31.7% were households with a female householder and no spouse or partner present. About 32.2% of all households were made up of individuals and 15.6% had someone living alone who was 65 years of age or older.

There were 735 housing units, of which 6.1% were vacant. The homeowner vacancy rate was 0.9% and the rental vacancy rate was 6.7%.

Racial composition as of the 2020 census
Race	Number	Percent
White	1,384	90.8%
Black or African American	17	1.1%
American Indian and Alaska Native	7	0.5%
Asian	3	0.2%
Native Hawaiian and Other Pacific Islander	0	0.0%
Some other race	15	1.0%
Two or more races	99	6.5%
Hispanic or Latino (of any race)	97	6.4%

=== 2010 census ===
As of the census of 2010, there were 1,555 people, 655 households, and 398 families living in the village. The population density was 822.8 inhabitants per square mile (317.7/km^{2}). There were 714 housing units at an average density of 377.8 per square mile (145.9/km^{2}). The racial makeup of the village was 93.9% White, 1.1% African American, 0.9% Native American, 0.2% Asian, 1.2% from other races, and 2.8% from two or more races. Hispanic or Latino of any race were 5.3% of the population.

There were 655 households, of which 32.7% had children under the age of 18 living with them, 38.9% were married couples living together, 16.3% had a female householder with no husband present, 5.5% had a male householder with no wife present, and 39.2% were non-families. 31.3% of all households were made up of individuals, and 11.4% had someone living alone who was 65 years of age or older. The average household size was 2.37 and the average family size was 2.99.

The median age in the village was 34.6 years. 25.1% of residents were under the age of 18; 12.4% were between the ages of 18 and 24; 26.9% were from 25 to 44; 23.5% were from 45 to 64; and 12.2% were 65 years of age or older. The gender makeup of the village was 47.3% male and 52.7% female.

=== 2000 census ===
As of the census of 2000, there were 1,653 people, 699 households, and 459 families living in the village. The population density was 861.5 inhabitants per square mile (332.6/km^{2}). There were 726 housing units at an average density of 378.4 per square mile (146.1/km^{2}). The racial makeup of the village was 95.64% White, 0.42% African American, 0.36% Native American, 0.54% Asian, 0.91% from other races, and 2.12% from two or more races. Hispanic or Latino of any race was 3.27% of the population.

There were 699 households, out of which 35.1% had children under the age of 18 living with them, 46.2% were married couples living together, 15.6% had a female householder with no husband present, and 34.3% were non-families. 29.9% of all households were made up of individuals, and 9.3% had someone living alone who was 65 years of age or older. The average household size was 2.35 and the average family size was 2.91.

In the village, the population was spread out, with 26.8% under the age of 18, 9.3% from 18 to 24, 34.5% from 25 to 44, 17.8% from 45 to 64, and 11.6% who were 65 years of age or older. The median age was 32 years. For every 100 females, there were 89.1 males. For every 100 females age 18 and over, there were 81.4 males.

The median income for a household in the village was $41,685, and the median income for a family was $48,553. Males had a median income of $35,547 versus $28,512 for females. The per capita income for the village was $20,631. About 3.8% of families and 4.8% of the population were below the poverty line, including 4.0% of those under age 18 and 3.2% of those of the age 65, or over.
