= Clio, Michigan =

City in Michigan, United States

- City
- City of Clio
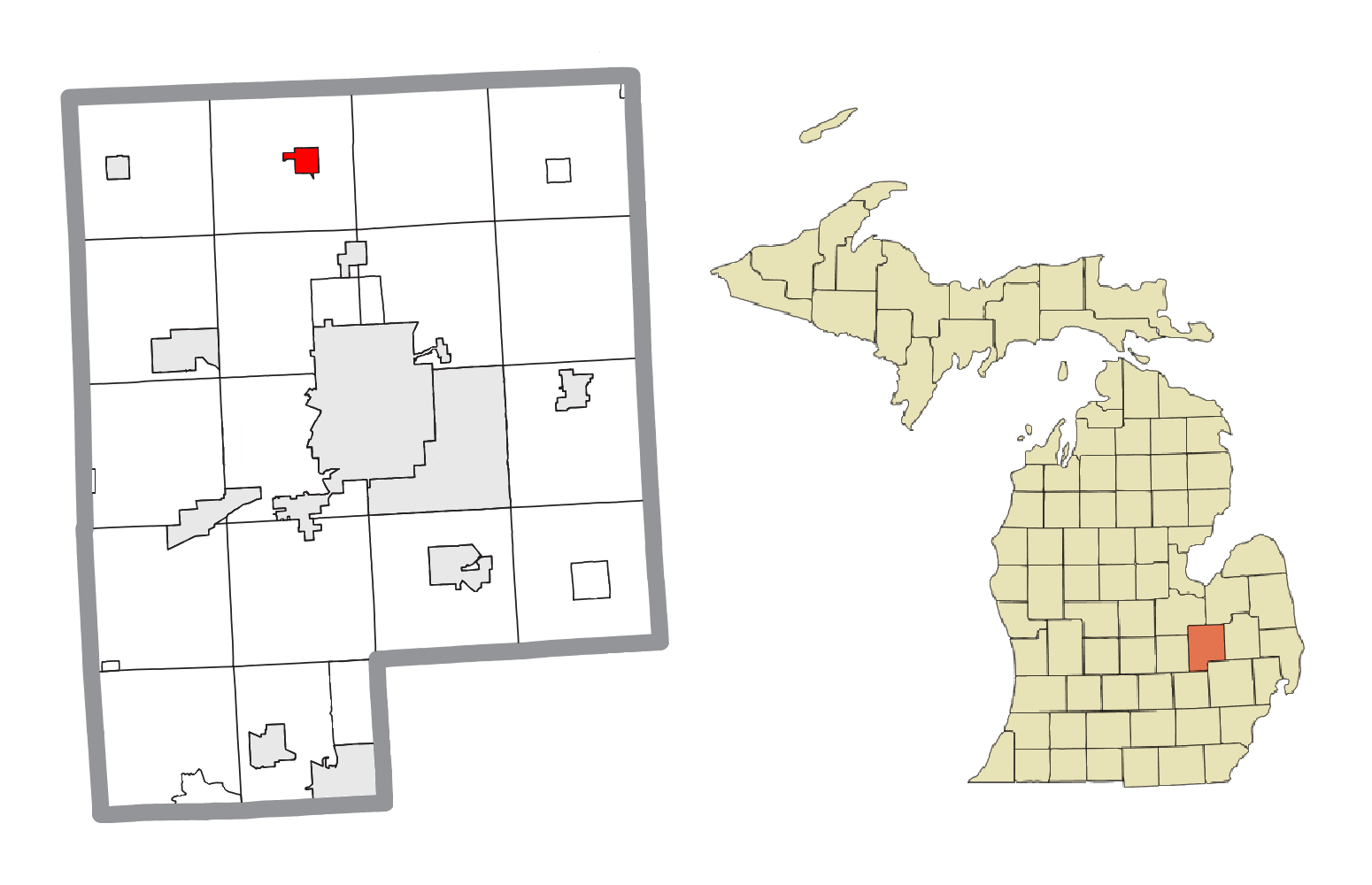
- Location within Genesee County

- Location within the state of Michigan
- Coordinates: 43°10′41″N 83°44′10″W
- Country: United States
- State: Michigan
- County: Genesee
- Settled: 1837
- Incorporated: 1873 (village); 1928 (city)

Government
  - Type: weak mayor- council
  - Mayor: Duane Mosher
  - City Administrator: Neil Rankin

Area
  - Total: 1.12 sq mi (2.90 km^{2})
  - Land: 1.11 sq mi (2.87 km^{2})
  - Water: 0.012 sq mi (0.03 km^{2})
- Elevation: 719 ft (219 m)

Population (2020)
  - Total: 2,525
  - Density: 2,278.3/sq mi (879.64/km^{2})
- Time zone: UTC-5 (Eastern (EST))
  - Summer (DST): UTC-4 (EDT)
- ZIP code(s): 48420
- Area code: 810
- FIPS code: 26-16620
- GNIS feature ID: 0623488
- Website: clio.govoffice.com

Clio (/ˈklaɪoʊ/) is a city in Genesee County in the U.S. state of Michigan. The city is located entirely within Vienna Township, but is administratively autonomous. As of the 2020 census, Clio had a population of 2,525.

Along with the rest of Genesee County, Clio is part of the Flint metropolitan statistical area.

== History ==
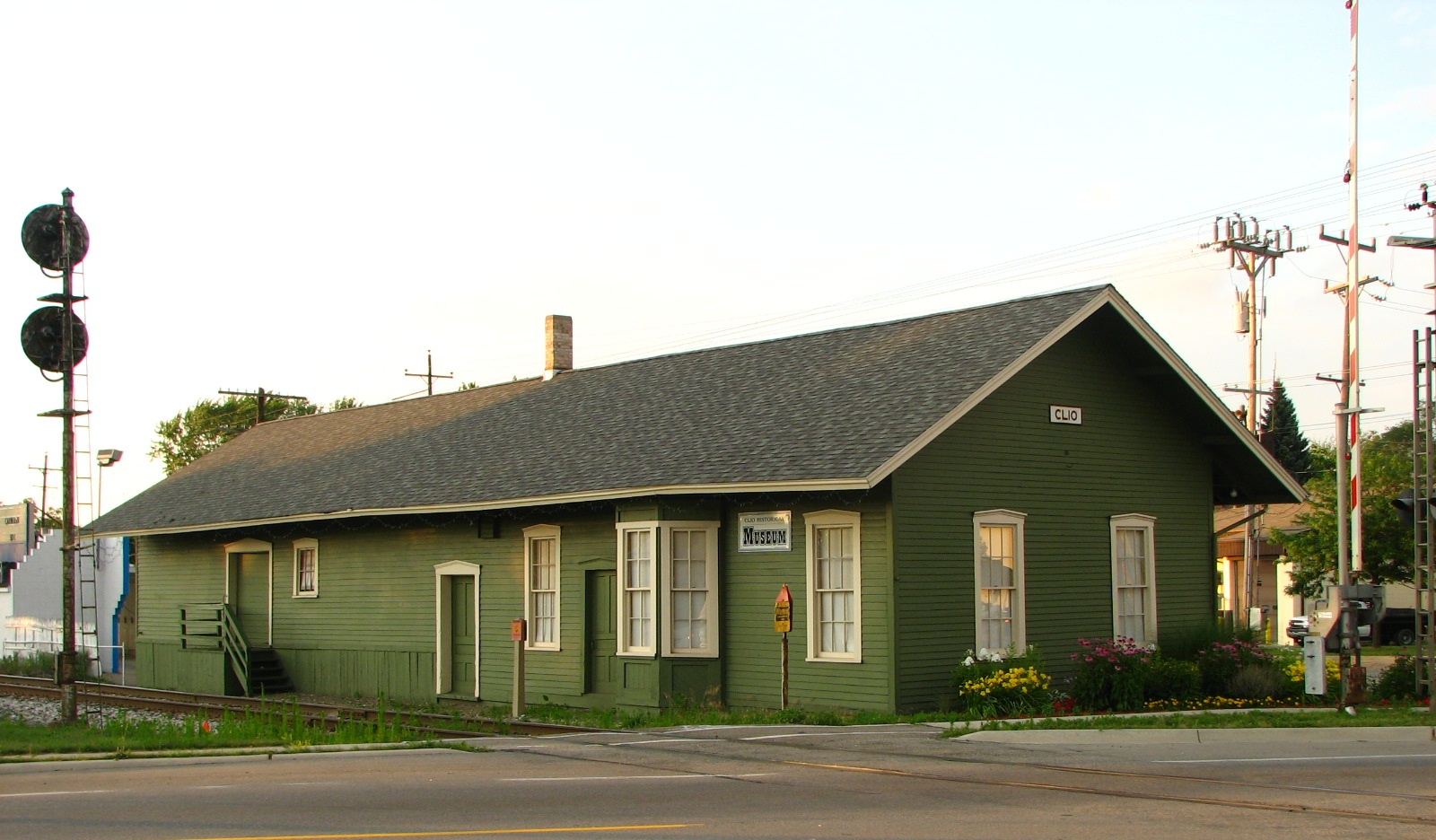
The former Clio Depot, built in 1873, now a museum.

It was originally named Varna after one of the city's first settlers. Pere Marquette Railroad came through and put a station there in 1861. Its name was changed in 1866 to Clio, the muse of history.

National Hugging Day was celebrated for the first time globally in 1986 in Clio, Michigan.

On July 23, 2007, Governor Jennifer Granholm announced Clio as a community chosen by the Michigan State Housing Development Authority (MSHDA), to take part in the Blueprints for Downtowns program. Clio would receive a comprehensive, market-driven strategy toward developing an action-oriented downtown that would result in economic growth, job creation and private investments. The Blueprints for Downtowns award, were announced to be also received by the communities of Caro and Ypsilanti. Scottville received a similar award to take part in the Cool Cities Michigan Main Street program.

On Monday November 27, 2017, the northern loop set of municipalities, including Clio, began receiving water from the Karegnondi Water Authority pipeline and treated by Genesee County Drain Commission Water and Waste Division.

== Geography ==
According to the United States Census Bureau, the city has a total area of 1.12 square miles (2.90 km^{2}), of which 1.11 square miles (2.87 km^{2}) is land and 0.01 square miles (0.03 km^{2}) is water.

== Demographics ==
Historical population
Census	Pop.	Note	%±
1880	489		—
1890	577		18.0%
1900	640		10.9%
1910	810		26.6%
1920	1,256		55.1%
1930	1,548		23.2%
1940	1,711		10.5%
1950	1,963		14.7%
1960	2,212		12.7%
1970	2,357		6.6%
1980	2,669		13.2%
1990	2,629		−1.5%
2000	2,483		−5.6%
2010	2,646		6.6%
2020	2,525		−4.6%
U.S. Decennial Census

=== 2020 census ===
As of the 2020 census, Clio had a population of 2,525. The median age was 40.3 years. 20.2% of residents were under the age of 18 and 20.6% of residents were 65 years of age or older. For every 100 females there were 86.9 males, and for every 100 females age 18 and over there were 78.1 males age 18 and over.

100.0% of residents lived in urban areas, while 0.0% lived in rural areas.

There were 1,223 households in Clio, of which 24.2% had children under the age of 18 living in them. Of all households, 29.0% were married-couple households, 20.8% were households with a male householder and no spouse or partner present, and 40.6% were households with a female householder and no spouse or partner present. About 41.4% of all households were made up of individuals and 19.3% had someone living alone who was 65 years of age or older.

There were 1,305 housing units, of which 6.3% were vacant. The homeowner vacancy rate was 2.2% and the rental vacancy rate was 7.3%.

Racial composition as of the 2020 census
Race	Number	Percent
White	2,234	88.5%
Black or African American	56	2.2%
American Indian and Alaska Native	12	0.5%
Asian	13	0.5%
Native Hawaiian and Other Pacific Islander	0	0.0%
Some other race	31	1.2%
Two or more races	179	7.1%
Hispanic or Latino (of any race)	127	5.0%

=== 2010 census ===
As of the census of 2010, there were 2,646 people, 1,196 households, and 654 families living in the city. The population density was 2,383.8 inhabitants per square mile (920.4/km^{2}). There were 1,336 housing units at an average density of 1,203.6 per square mile (464.7/km^{2}). The racial makeup of the city was 95.2% White, 1.1% African American, 0.6% Native American, 0.2% Asian, 0.8% from other races, and 2.1% from two or more races. Hispanic or Latino of any race were 3.2% of the population.

There were 1,196 households, of which 30.4% had children under the age of 18 living with them, 33.0% were married couples living together, 16.2% had a female householder with no husband present, 5.4% had a male householder with no wife present, and 45.3% were non-families. 38.6% of all households were made up of individuals, and 15.6% had someone living alone who was 65 years of age or older. The average household size was 2.21 and the average family size was 2.93.

The median age in the city was 35.7 years. 24.3% of residents were under the age of 18; 11.4% were between the ages of 18 and 24; 26% were from 25 to 44; 22.8% were from 45 to 64; and 15.5% were 65 years of age or older. The gender makeup of the city was 47.2% male and 52.8% female.

=== 2000 census ===
As of the census of 2000, there were 2,483 people, 1,093 households, and 659 families living in the city. The population density was 2,109.8 inhabitants per square mile (814.6/km^{2}). There were 1,205 housing units at an average density of 1,023.9 per square mile (395.3/km^{2}). The racial makeup of the city was 95.49% White, 0.48% African American, 0.60% Native American, 0.16% Asian, 0.04% Pacific Islander, 0.81% from other races, and 2.42% from two or more races. Hispanic or Latino of any race were 2.22% of the population.

There were 1,093 households, out of which 29.0% had children under the age of 18 living with them, 40.3% were married couples living together, 15.6% had a female householder with no husband present, and 39.7% were non-families. 32.8% of all households were made up of individuals, and 10.4% had someone living alone who was 65 years of age or older. The average household size was 2.27 and the average family size was 2.88.

In the city, the population was spread out, with 24.2% under the age of 18, 12.0% from 18 to 24, 30.6% from 25 to 44, 19.5% from 45 to 64, and 13.7% who were 65 years of age or older. The median age was 34 years. For every 100 females, there were 89.3 males. For every 100 females age 18 and over, there were 87.2 males.

The median income for a household in the city was $35,859, and the median income for a family was $42,155. Males had a median income of $37,109 versus $24,706 for females. The per capita income for the city was $19,727. About 5.7% of families and 7.9% of the population were below the poverty line, including 10.3% of those under age 18 and 4.1% of those age 65 or over.

== Government ==
Clio receives water from the Karegnondi Water Authority pipeline treated by Genesee County Drain Commission Water and Waste Division. Fire services are provide by the Clio Area Fire Authority, as do Thetford and Vienna Townships, under an authority board.

In July of 2022, Clio Police Department Chief Wendel Millstead announced a full staff of 4 full time and 3 part time sworn officers for a total of 8 including himself.

Clio is within of the following:

- Genesee County Commissioner District 7
- Michigan House of Representatives District 48
- State Senate District 27
- 67th District Court Division 1
- Michigan's 8th Congressional District
- Genesee District Library
- Clio Area School District

== Notable people ==
- Cam "Buzz" Brainard, an American voice actor, narrator, and radio personality.
- John D. Cherry, 60th Lieutenant Governor of Michigan (2003 to 2011)
