= Mount Morris, Michigan =

City in Michigan, United States

- City
- City of Mount Morris
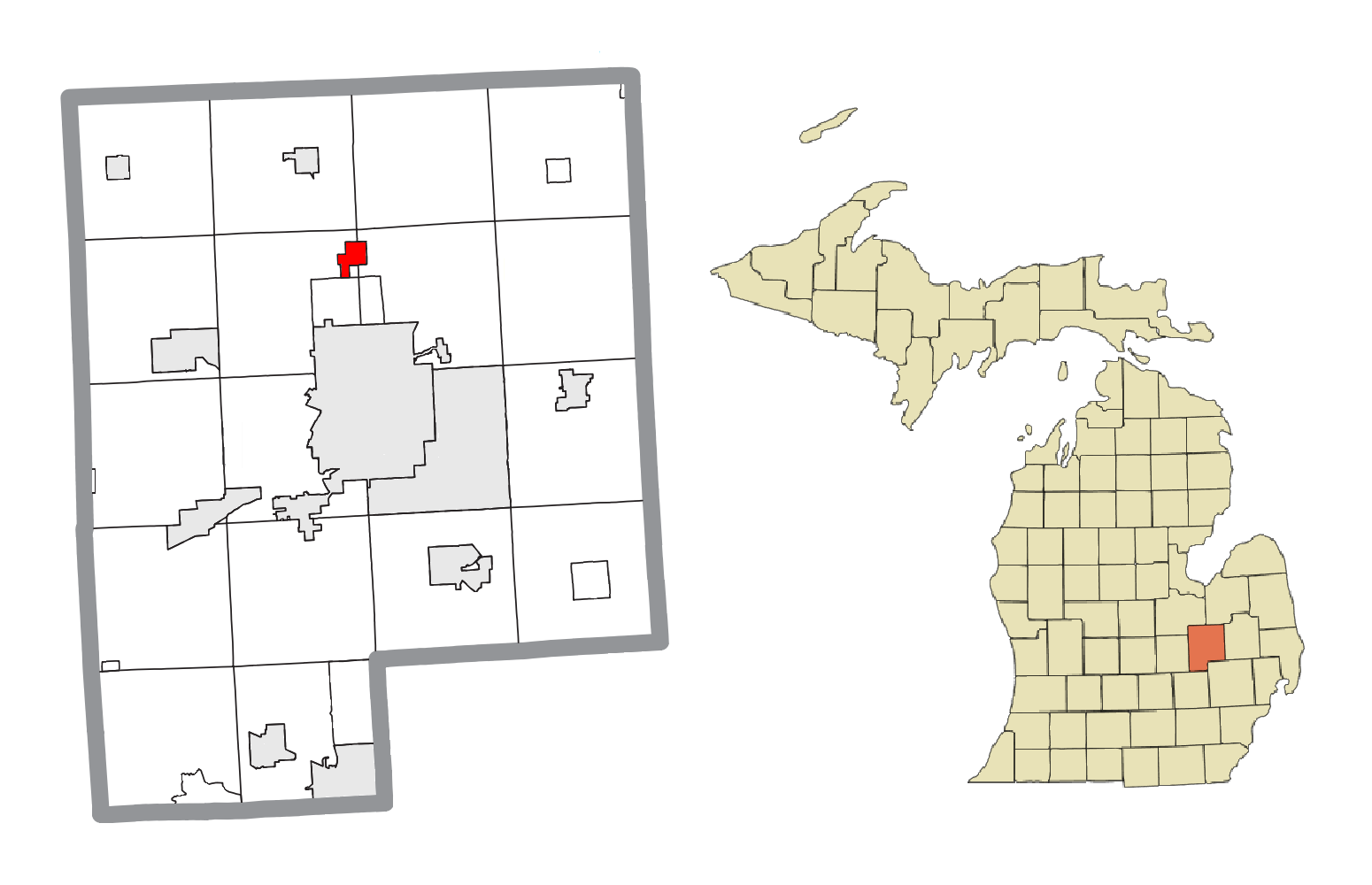
- Location within Genesee County

- Location within the state of Michigan
- Coordinates: 43°07′12″N 83°42′47″W
- Country: United States
- State: Michigan
- County: Genesee
- Settled: 1833
- Platted: 1862 (as Dover)
- Incorporated: 1867 (village); 1929 (city)

Government
  - Type: Council–manager
  - Mayor: Sara Dubey
  - City manager: Vicki Fishell

Area
  - Total: 1.15 sq mi (2.97 km^{2})
  - Land: 1.15 sq mi (2.97 km^{2})
  - Water: 0 sq mi (0.00 km^{2})
- Elevation: 774 ft (236 m)

Population (2020)
  - Total: 3,170
  - Density: 2,760.6/sq mi (1,065.86/km^{2})
- Time zone: UTC-5 (EST)
  - Summer (DST): UTC-4 (EDT)
- ZIP code(s): 48458
- Area code: 810
- FIPS code: 26-55960
- GNIS feature ID: 0632820
- Website: www.cityofmtmorris.org

Mount Morris is a city in Genesee County in the U.S. state of Michigan. The population was 3,170 at the 2020 census. The city is bordered by Mount Morris Township on the west and Genesee Township on the east. It was named after Mount Morris, New York, because many of the early settlers had come from there. It is part of the Flint metropolitan area.

== History ==
Benjamin Pearson was the first settler in the area in 1833. In 1836, Frederick Walker was the first to settle within the future village site. A post office named Mount Morris was established on July 11, 1837, with Charles N. Beecher as the first postmaster. The name of the office was changed to Genesee on January 19, 1839, and back to Mount Morris on April 25, 1857. The name became Mount Morris Station on April 17, 1865, and finally reverted to Mount Morris on March 9, 1874. Development was spurred with the building of a line of the Pere Marquette Railway (now owned by Lake State Railway) in 1857. The settlement was first platted as Dover in 1862 and was incorporated as the village of Mount Morris in 1867. It reincorporated as a city in 1929.

On Monday, November 27, 2017, the northern Genesee County loop set of municipalities, including Mount Morris, began receiving water from the Karegnondi Water Authority pipeline treated by Genesee County Drain Commission Water and Waste Division.

== Geography ==
According to the United States Census Bureau, the city has a total area of 1.20 square miles (3.11 km^{2}), all land.

== Demographics ==
Historical population
Census	Pop.	Note	%±
1880	502		—
1890	351		−30.1%
1900	416		18.5%
1910	513		23.3%
1920	1,174		128.8%
1930	1,982		68.8%
1940	2,237		12.9%
1950	2,890		29.2%
1960	3,484		20.6%
1970	3,778		8.4%
1980	3,246		−14.1%
1990	3,292		1.4%
2000	3,194		−3.0%
2010	3,086		−3.4%
2020	3,170		2.7%
U.S. Decennial Census

=== 2020 census ===
As of the 2020 census, Mount Morris had a population of 3,170. The median age was 33.8 years. 25.8% of residents were under the age of 18 and 11.1% of residents were 65 years of age or older. For every 100 females there were 85.8 males, and for every 100 females age 18 and over there were 84.5 males age 18 and over.

100.0% of residents lived in urban areas, while 0.0% lived in rural areas.

There were 1,336 households in Mount Morris, of which 33.9% had children under the age of 18 living in them. Of all households, 27.2% were married-couple households, 23.0% were households with a male householder and no spouse or partner present, and 38.8% were households with a female householder and no spouse or partner present. About 32.7% of all households were made up of individuals and 9.5% had someone living alone who was 65 years of age or older.

There were 1,460 housing units, of which 8.5% were vacant. The homeowner vacancy rate was 2.6% and the rental vacancy rate was 9.7%.

Racial composition as of the 2020 census
Race	Number	Percent
White	2,289	72.2%
Black or African American	554	17.5%
American Indian and Alaska Native	17	0.5%
Asian	21	0.7%
Native Hawaiian and Other Pacific Islander	0	0.0%
Some other race	40	1.3%
Two or more races	249	7.9%
Hispanic or Latino (of any race)	171	5.4%

=== 2010 census ===
At the 2010 census there were 3,086 people in 1,317 households, including 780 families, in the city. The population density was 2,571.7 inhabitants per square mile (992.9/km^{2}). There were 1,505 housing units at an average density of 1,254.2 per square mile (484.2/km^{2}). The racial makup of the city was 80.1% White, 13.4% African American, 0.6% Native American, 0.5% Asian, 1.1% from other races, and 4.3% from two or more races. Hispanic or Latino of any race were 4.4%.

Of the 1,317 households 35.9% had children under the age of 18 living with them, 31.4% were married couples living together, 22.0% had a female householder with no husband present, 5.8% had a male householder with no wife present, and 40.8% were non-families. 34.2% of households were one person and 9.3% were one person aged 65 or older. The average household size was 2.34 and the average family size was 2.98.

The median age was 34 years. 27.1% of residents were under the age of 18; 9.6% were between the ages of 18 and 24; 28.2% were from 25 to 44; 25.8% were from 45 to 64; and 9.4% were 65 or older. The gender makeup of the city was 46.2% male and 53.8% female.

As of 2013, estimates show drastic changes from 2000. The median household income was $21,778 and the median family income was $28,864. For full-time, year-round workers, males had a median income of $51,467 versus $29,455 for females. The per capita income for the city was $13,340. About 34.6% of families and 38.4% of the population were below the poverty line, including 57.6% of those under age 18 and 9.6% of those age 65 or over.

=== 2000 census ===
At the 2000 census there were 3,194 people in 1,312 households, including 826 families, in the city. The population density was 2,660 inhabitants per square mile (1,030/km^{2}). There were 1,402 housing units at an average density of 1,167.6 per square mile (450.8/km^{2}). The racial makup of the city was 93.14% White, 3.07% African American, 0.59% Native American, 0.41% Asian, 0.03% Pacific Islander, 0.63% from other races, and 2.13% from two or more races. Hispanic or Latino of any race were 2.22%.

Of the 1,312 households 35.1% had children under the age of 18 living with them, 41.4% were married couples living together, 17.2% had a female householder with no husband present, and 37.0% were non-families. 30.5% of households were one person and 10.5% were one person aged 65 or older. The average household size was 2.43 and the average family size was 3.04.

The age distribution was 27.9% under the age of 18, 11.2% from 18 to 24, 30.9% from 25 to 44, 19.7% from 45 to 64, and 10.2% 65 or older. The median age was 32 years. For every 100 females, there were 91.0 males. For every 100 females age 18 and over, there were 85.9 males.

The median household income was $32,617 and the median family income was $36,389. Males had a median income of $31,318 versus $23,828 for females. The per capita income for the city was $19,132. About 13.0% of families and 14.5% of the population were below the poverty line, including 25.1% of those under age 18 and none of those age 65 or over.

== Government ==
Mount Morris City has a Council–manager government form. The city receives water from the Karegnondi Water Authority pipeline treated by Genesee County Drain Commission Water and Waste Division.

Mount Morris is part of the following:

- Genesee County Commissioner District 1
- Michigan House of Representatives District 49
- State Senate District 27
- 67th District Court Division 3
- Michigan's 8th Congressional District
- Genesee District Library
- Mount Morris Consolidated Schools
