= Interstate 75 in Michigan =

Interstate Highway in Michigan, United States

Interstate 75
- I-75 highlighted in red

Route information
- Maintained by MDOT and MBA
- Length: 395.916 mi (637.165 km)
- Existed: 1959–present
- History: Completed November 1, 1973
- Tourist routes: Lake Erie Circle Tour; Lake Michigan Circle Tour; Lake Huron Circle Tour; Lake Superior Circle Tour
- NHS: Entire route

Major junctions
- South end: I-75 near Erie at the Ohio state line
- I-96 in Detroit; I-94 in Detroit; I-696 near Royal Oak; US 23 near Grand Blanc; I-69 in Flint; US 10 near Bay City; US 127 near Grayling; US 31 near Mackinaw City; US 2 in St. Ignace; M-28 near Sault Ste. Marie
- North end: International Bridge in Sault Ste. Marie

Location
- Country: United States
- State: Michigan
- Counties: Monroe, Wayne, Oakland, Genesee, Saginaw, Bay, Arenac, Ogemaw, Roscommon, Crawford, Otsego, Cheboygan, Emmet, Mackinac, Chippewa

Highway system
- Interstate Highway System; Main; Auxiliary; Suffixed; Business; Future; Michigan State Trunkline Highway System; Interstate; US; State; Byways
← M-74	→ BL I-75

Interstate 75 (I-75) is a part of the Interstate Highway System that runs from the Hialeah–Miami Lakes line to the Canadian border at Sault Ste. Marie, Michigan. I-75 enters the state from Ohio in the south, north of Toledo, and runs generally northward through Detroit, Flint, and Bay City, crosses the Mackinac Bridge and ends at the border in Sault Ste. Marie. The freeway runs for approximately 396 miles (637 km) on both of Michigan's major peninsulas. The landscapes traversed by I-75 include Southern Michigan farmland, northern forests, suburban bedroom communities, and the urban core of Detroit. The freeway also uses three of the state's monumental bridges to cross major bodies of water. There are four auxiliary Interstates in the state related to I-75, as well as nine current or former business routes, with either Business Loop I-75 (BL I-75) or Business Spur I-75 (BS I-75) designations.

The freeway bears several names in addition to the I-75 designation. The southern segment was called the Detroit–Toledo Expressway during planning in the 1950s and 1960s. Through Detroit, I-75 is the Fisher Freeway or the Walter P. Chrysler Freeway, named for pioneers in the auto industry. Sections on either side of the Mackinac Bridge are the G. Mennen Williams Freeway or the Prentiss M. Brown Freeway, named for politicians who helped get the bridge built. Officially, the entire length is the American Legion Memorial Highway, after the organization of the same name. Various sections carry components of the four Great Lakes Circle Tours in the state.

Several Indian trails spanned the state along the general path of the contemporary freeway. After statehood, several of these were converted into plank roads that later became some of the first state highways. In the 1920s, five of these were added to the United States Numbered Highway System: US Highway 2 (US 2), US 10, US 24, US 25, and US 27. In the 1950s, a Michigan Turnpike was proposed as a tolled, controlled-access highway in the Lower Peninsula. After passage of the Federal Highway Act of 1956, this turnpike proposal was shelved as a free Interstate Highway was planned. Construction started in 1957, signs went up in 1959, and I-75 was completed in 1973. Since completion, the freeway has been upgraded with the construction of the Zilwaukee Bridge near Saginaw and improved connections to the Ambassador Bridge in Detroit.

== Route description ==
Known as "Michigan's Main Street", I-75 is listed on the National Highway System (NHS) for its entire length; the NHS is a network of roadways important to the country's economy, defense, and mobility. The freeway is the busiest in the state: between M-8 (Davison Highway) and McNichols Road in Detroit approximately 194,300 vehicles used the freeway on average each day in 2010; in contrast the lowest traffic level was 3,208 vehicles between the M-48 and M-80 interchanges in Chippewa County. I-75 carries segments of all four Great Lakes Circle Tours in the state. It is also the only highway located on both Michigan's Upper and Lower peninsulas (UP and LP, respectively). Between the Ohio state line and Kawkawlin, I-75 contains between a minimum of six and a maximum of ten lanes total; other sections vary between four and six lanes in total.

=== Lake Erie shore and the Downriver communities ===
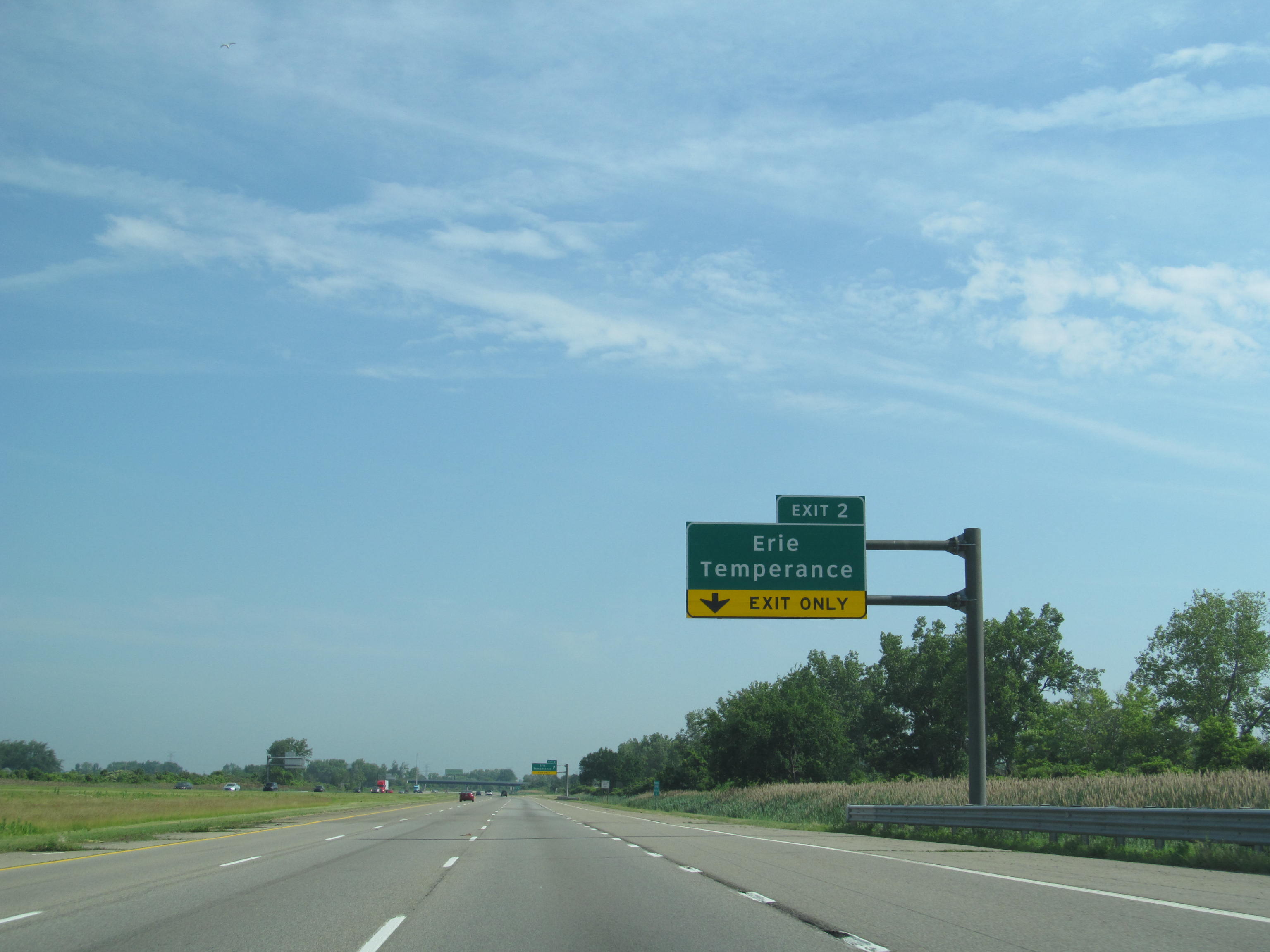
I-75 northbound approaching exit 2 in Monroe County

Crossing the state line north of Toledo, Ohio, I-75 enters Michigan in Monroe County carrying the Lake Erie Circle Tour (LECT) near the North Maumee Bay of Lake Erie. The freeway runs parallel to the shoreline of the Great Lake and past the community of Luna Pier. Further north, I-75 passes to the southeast of Monroe and crosses the River Raisin between the city and the river mouth. North of the river, the freeway turns further inland running through farmland. Near Newport, I-275 splits off to the northwest and I-75 continues its northeastward trek through Monroe County. When it crosses the Huron River, the trunkline enters Wayne County between South Rockwood and Rockwood.

On the north side of the county line, I-75 begins to run inland of, and parallel to, the Detroit River, entering the Downriver area. The freeway turns northerly after the interchange with M-85 (Fort Street) near Gibraltar, and the LECT departs I-75 to follow M-85 north of the interchange. The landscape transitions to suburban residential areas instead of farmland through this area. The freeway turns back northeasterly in Taylor and intersects the southern end of M-39 (Southfield Highway) in Lincoln Park. I-75 crosses the Ecorse River and passes through an industrial area of Metro Detroit. Farther north, the freeway spans the River Rouge in the southern part of Detroit.

I-75 parallels M-85 (Fort Street) and follows the Detroit River as far east as the Ambassador Bridge. Near the bridge's approaches, the freeway turns 90° away from the river and intersects the eastern end of I-96 before turning again to follow the river further inland. From there, I-75 meets M-10 (Lodge Freeway) and M-5 (Grand River Avenue). East of Grand River, I-75 travels past Little Caesars Arena, home of the Detroit Red Wings and Detroit Pistons, and passes under M-1 (Woodward Avenue). East of Woodward, the freeway travels past both Comerica Park and Ford Field, homes of the Detroit Tigers and Detroit Lions professional sports teams, respectively.

=== Detroit to the Tri-Cities ===
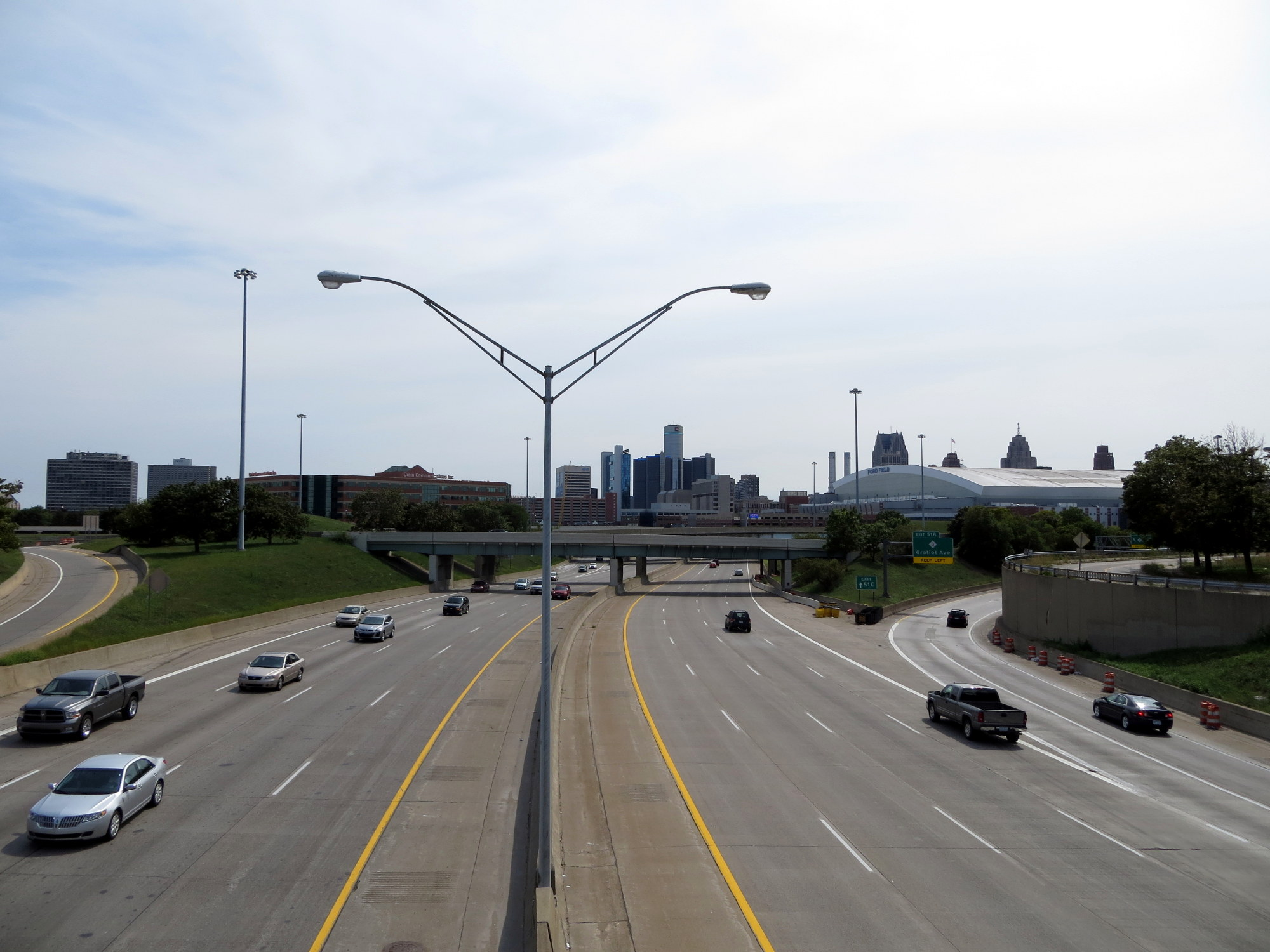
Looking south along the Chrysler Freeway to the Detroit skyline

Immediately east of Ford Field, I-75 turns northwesterly to follow the Chrysler Freeway away from the downtown Detroit area. The transition from the Fisher Freeway involves a set of one-lane ramps through the interchange with the connections to I-375 and M-3 (Gratiot Avenue). Heading north-northwesterly, I-75 passes to the east of the campus of Wayne State University and through an interchange with I-94 (Edsel Ford Freeway). The Chrysler Freeway passes to the west of Hamtramck and to the east of Highland Park, enclaves within Detroit. I-75 meets M-8 (Davison Freeway) and continues through residential areas of Detroit's northern side. North of M-102 (8 Mile Road), the freeway crosses out of Detroit and into Oakland County. The Chrysler Freeway jogs through the suburb of Hazel Park, site of the "worst freeway for accidents in Metro Detroit" at a curve near 9 Mile Road.

Further north, I-75 intersects I-696 near 10 Mile Road. The freeway continues northward for about six miles (9.7 km) into Troy, where it turns westward. The route for I-75 zig-zags through Troy and Auburn Hills as the freeway alternates from north–south to east–west to bypass Pontiac. Near the M-59 interchange, I-75 passes the headquarters for Chrysler. Farther north, by the M-24 interchange, it runs near the former site of The Palace of Auburn Hills. The freeway traverses through additional suburban residential areas as it runs northwesterly away from Pontiac. These subdivisions end north of Clarkston, which is the location of the northern terminus for US 24. Continuing through Holly and Newark, the freeway transitions back to a rural, wooded setting and enters Genesee County.

As I-75 approaches Grand Blanc, the landscape changes back to suburbs. I-475 (UAW Freeway) splits off to the north to bypass the east side of Flint, and then I-75 merges with US 23. The combined I-75/US 23 turns northerly to round the west side of the city. I-75/US 23 meets I-69 near the Bishop International Airport southwest of downtown Flint. The freeway continues northward along the western residential neighborhoods, encountering the northern end of I-475 near Mount Morris. I-75 passes to the west of Clio and the east of Birch Run, the latter home to a large outlet mall. From there, the trunkline travels through farmland in southern Saginaw County.

=== Central Michigan ===
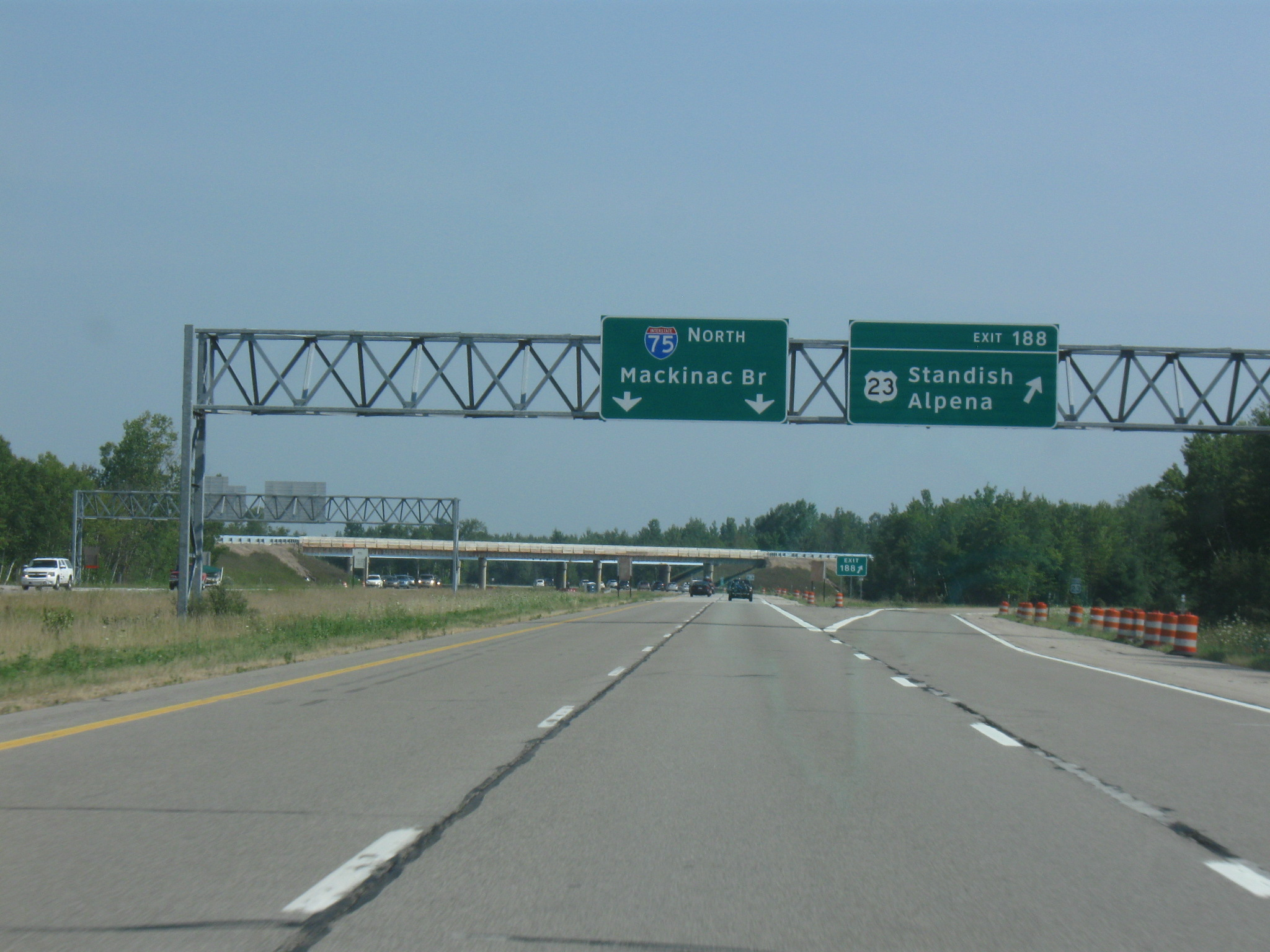
Split between I-75 and US 23 west of Standish

I-75/US 23 enters the southern reaches of the suburban Tri-Cities at Bridgeport and proceeds northward through the area. The freeway passes to the east of downtown Saginaw. I-675 splits off to run westward into downtown, and I-75 curves around to the northwest to cross the Saginaw River on the Zilwaukee Bridge in the suburb of Zilwaukee. North of the river, I-675 reconnects to I-75, which continues northward into Bay County. The freeway passes to the west of Bay City, encountering the interchange marking the eastern end of US 10 and the western end of M-25. From there, I-75/US 23 curves northwesterly to bypass Kawkawlin before continuing north to the Standish area through farmlands inland from the Saginaw Bay. West of Standish, US 23 splits to follow the Lake Huron shoreline, and I-75 turns northwesterly to run inland.

West of Sterling, the landscape changes again; in this area the freeway enters forest lands. I-75 continues northwestward through Arenac County and crosses into western Ogemaw County. M-30 passes under the freeway without an interchange as I-75 rounds the west side of West Branch. On the northwest side of that city, M-55 merges onto I-75, and the two highways turn to run concurrently westward into Roscommon County. East of Prudenville, M-55 splits from the freeway. I-75 turns northward to curve around the east of Houghton and Higgins lakes. Turning back to the northwest, the trunkline bypasses Roscommon to the south and transfers into southern Crawford County. About five miles (8.0 km) north of the county line, I-75 meets the northern end of US 127, the former US 27.

=== Northern Michigan ===
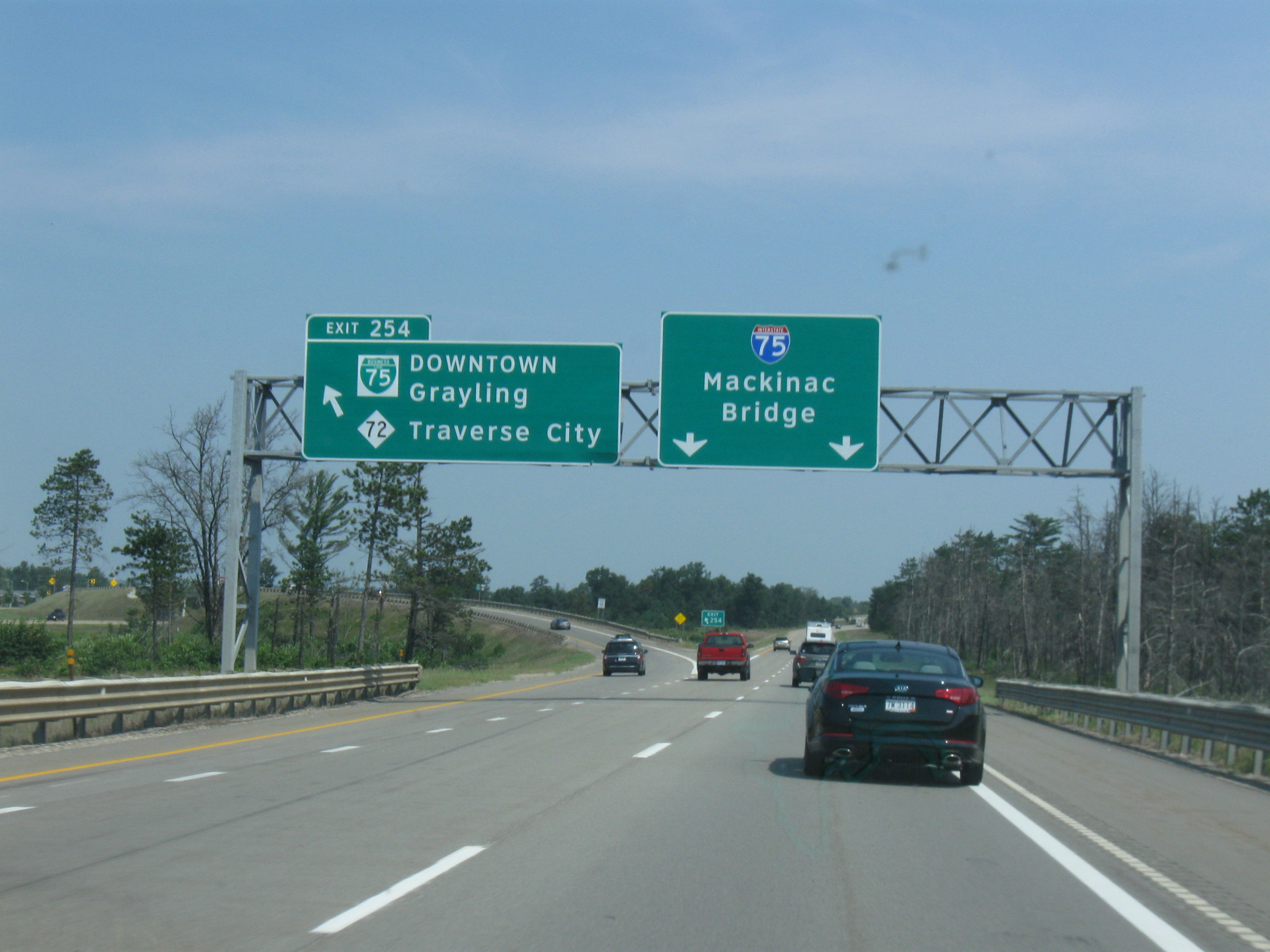
Exit 254 south of Grayling

After the US 127 interchange, I-75 turns northward, and passes to the east of Grayling. There are a pair of interchanges on either end of town for BL I-75, and the southern one is a partial interchange; only northbound I-75 traffic may access the business loop and traffic entering the freeway may only access southbound I-75. There is no interchange further north for M-72; access to that highway is provided through the business loop. On the north side of Grayling, there is a full interchange for BL I-75/M-93 that provides the southbound I-75 connection to M-72 as well as access from both directions to Hartwick Pines State Park.

Crossing into southern Otsego County, I-75 continues northward through Northern Michigan forests. It passes to the east of the community of Waters and Otsego Lake. North of exit 279, I-75 proceeds by the Gaylord Regional Airport and crosses the 45th Parallel, the halfway mark between the Equator and the North Pole by latitude. The freeway then traverses the west side of Gaylord and continues through forests in the northern sections of the county. North of Vanderbilt, I-75 enters southern Cheboygan County, assuming the G. Mennen Williams Freeway name.

I-75 continues northward through Cheboygan County, passing the community of Indian River and spanning the river of the same name. North of town, the freeway traverses the area between Burt and Mullett lakes before intersecting the southern end of M-27; that highway provides access to Topinabee and Cheboygan. I-75 continues northward through tree farms and other agricultural properties in rural Cheboygan County. Cheboygan is accessible by way of interchanges for C-64 and C-66, a pair of county-designated highways in this area. North of C-66, I-75 turns northwesterly. The freeway meets the northern end of US 31 and picks up the Lake Michigan Circle Tour (LMCT) designation before entering Emmet County on the south side of Mackinaw City. I-75 then parallels the county line on the west side of the village, meeting the northern end of US 23. After that interchange, the Lake Huron Circle Tour (LHCT) merges in from the south. There is one more interchange along the freeway before I-75 ascends the approach to the Mackinac Bridge.

=== Mackinac Bridge ===
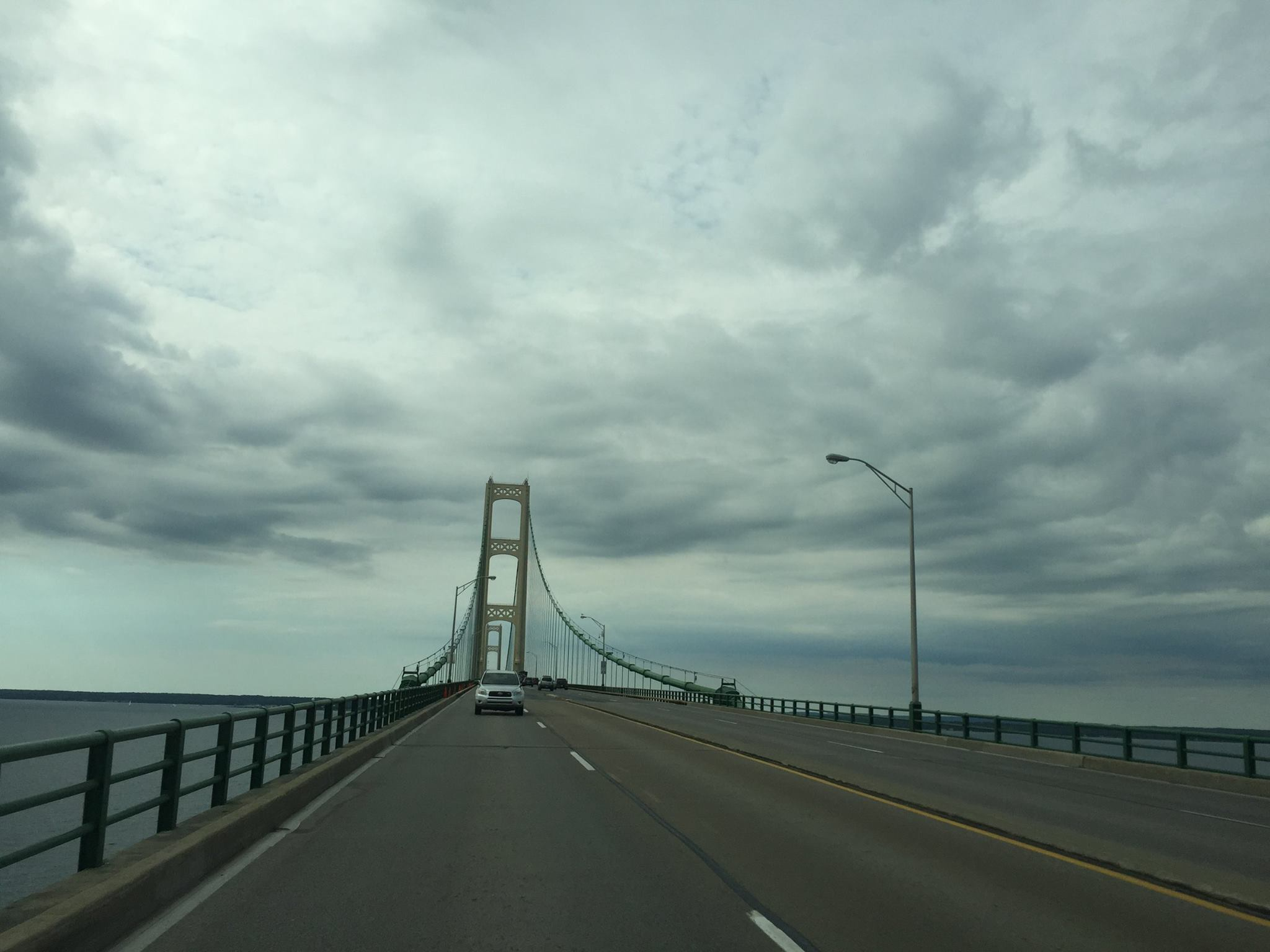
I-75 crossing the Mackinac Bridge

The Mackinac Bridge carries I-75 across the Straits of Mackinac that separate Michigan's Upper and Lower peninsulas; the straits also form the connection between Lakes Michigan and Huron. The structure, unlike the rest of the state highways in Michigan like I-75, is under the maintenance and control of the Mackinac Bridge Authority (MBA). (Note: The MBA is an independent state agency responsible for the Mackinac Bridge and thus maintains that section of the overall highway system. The MBA works with MDOT but does not report to it. The executive secretary of the MBA is appointed by MDOT with MBA approval.) The authority collects a toll from traffic that crosses the bridge, which as of January 1, 2012, is $4 for passenger cars and $5 per axle for commercial vehicles and motorhomes. In addition to cash, the MBA offers a pre-paid debit card option for the payment of tolls and accepts credit cards at the toll booths. The authority also provides a driver assistance program that will drive vehicles across the bridge at no additional charge; motorists who use the service have a fear of bridges. Because the bridge normally only allows motor vehicles, bicyclists and snowmobiles shuttled across are subject to fees. The authority maintains a small police department to patrol the bridge and escort vehicles across, and a pair of radio station transmitters that broadcast bridge conditions and travel information on AM 530 and AM 1610.

=== Upper Peninsula ===
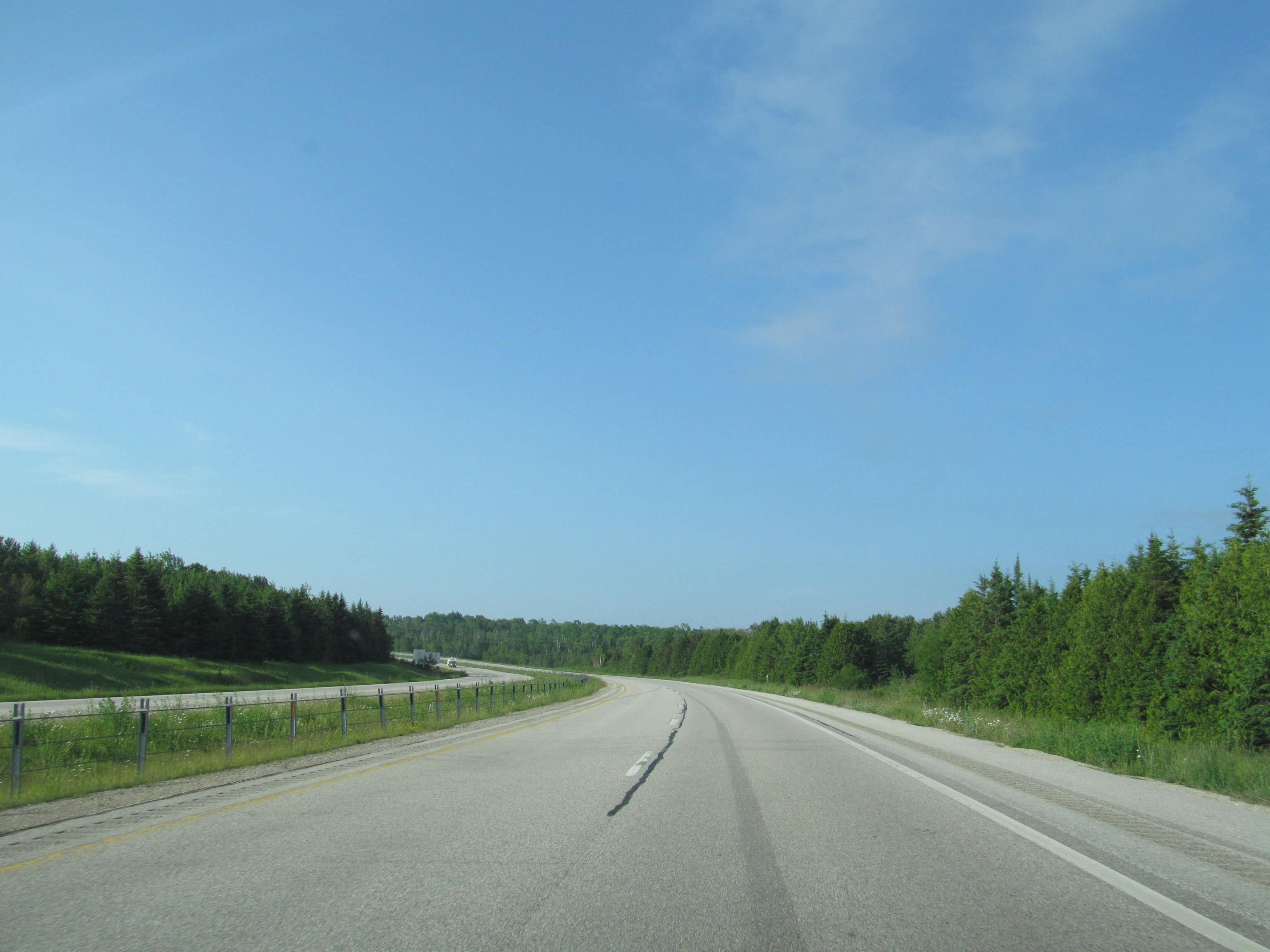
North of St. Ignace

North of the Mackinac Bridge, I-75 passes to the west of downtown St. Ignace, traveling between the Father Marquette National Memorial and Straits State Park. There is an interchange north of the toll plaza that marks the eastern end of US 2 in the state and the southern end of BL I-75. The LMCT departs I-75 to follow US 2 while the LHCT follows BL I-75 through town. The freeway curves around Chain Lake and the Mackinac County Airport and meets the northern end of the business loop near Castle Rock; the LHCT returns to I-75 at that interchange as well. Continuing northward, M-123 (Tahquamenon Trail) intersects from the west as the freeway parallels H-63 (Mackinac Trail), the former route of US 2. I-75 crosses the Carp River and follows the shores of St. Martin Bay before meeting M-134. At that interchange, the LHCT departs again to run eastward. Through this area, the freeway continues northeasterly, traversing the Eastern Unit of the Hiawatha National Forest.

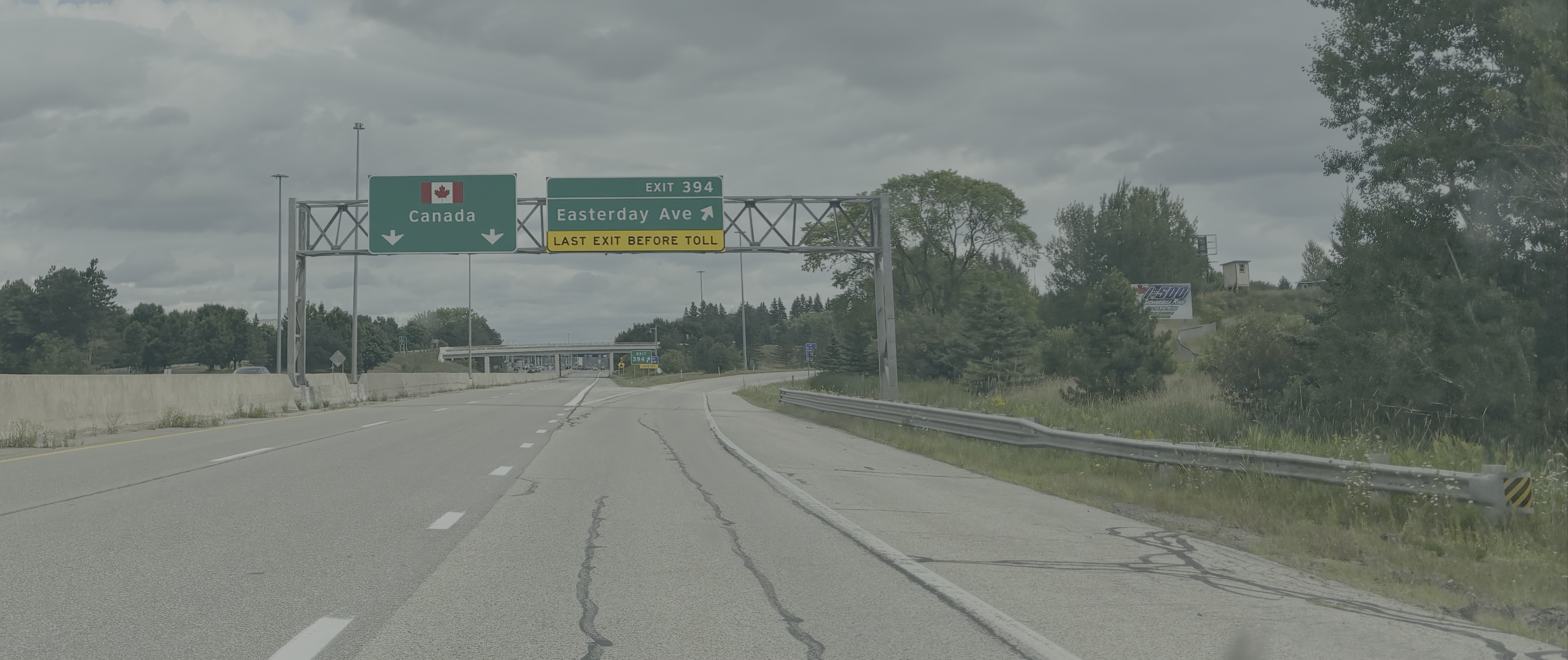
Signage for exit 394 (Easterday Avenue) and Canada in Sault Ste. Marie

I-75 crosses the Pine River before entering Chippewa County. The freeway takes a more northerly track as it travels under M-48 without an interchange. Farther north, M-48 curves around to connect I-75 with Rudyard, and the freeway turns back to continue northeastward. About five miles (8.0 km) northeast of Rudyard, I-75 passes next to Chippewa County International Airport, the former Kincheloe Air Force Base in Kinross and Kincheloe. North of there in Dafter, the freeway intersects M-28 (9 Mile Road). Beyond that interchange, I-75 picks up the Lake Superior Circle Tour (LSCT) designation, which it carries the rest of the way north. On the south side of Sault Ste. Marie, the freeway meets BS I-75 and picks up the LHCT designation one more time. I-75 rounds the west side of the city, passes the Sault Ste. Marie Municipal Airport and the campus of Lake Superior State University before meeting the customs and toll plazas for the International Bridge. From there, I-75 crosses the two-lane bridge and terminates at the Canadian border. (Note: The sign assembly erected by MDOT indicates that I-75 ends just south of the toll and customs plaza for the International Bridge, however according to MDOT's Physical Reference Finder Application online and the Federal Highway Administration's Route Log and Finder List, I-75 continues onto the International Bridge and ends at the international border in the middle of the St. Marys River.) As of April 1, 2012, the toll rates on the bridge are $3 for passenger vehicles, $2.10 for commuters, and $4 per axle for commercial vehicles; currently the same toll rate is assessed in US dollars and Canadian dollars. Motorists have the option to pay with cash or an IQ Card, an electronic toll collection debit card that uses radio-frequency identification technology.

== History ==
=== Indian trails to state highways ===
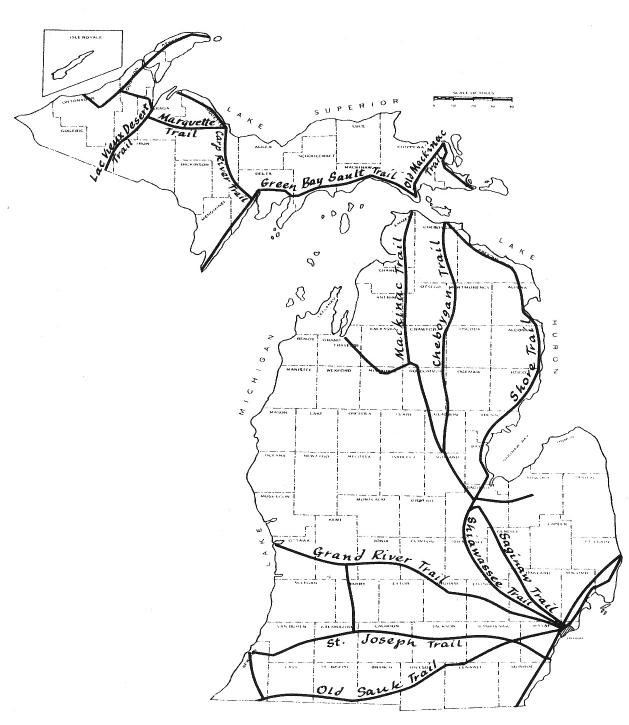
Map of the pre-statehood Indian trails

Before Michigan became a state, the first land transportation corridors were the Indian trails. The French-Indian Trail ran through southeastern Michigan between Toledo, Monroe and Detroit. The Saginaw Trail ran north from Detroit to the Saginaw area where it connected with the original Mackinaw Trail that ran roughly parallel to, and west of, the contemporary I-75. Another path, the Cheboygan Trail, ran parallel to the contemporary freeway to the east between the West Branch area and Cheboygan. In the UP, an extension of the Mackinac Trail connected St. Ignace and Sault Ste. Marie. In the 19th century, the Michigan Legislature chartered private companies to build and operate plank roads or turnpikes in the state, many of which replaced the original Indian trails. These roads were originally made of oak planks, but later legislation permitted gravel as well. By the first decade of the 20th century, only 23 of the 202 chartered turnpikes were still in operation; many companies that received a charter never built their specified roadways. The remaining plank roads were turned over to the state or purchased by railway companies in the early part of the century.

The State Trunkline Highway System was formed on May 13, 1913, and several sections of the system were designated along the course of the then-future I-75. Division 1 connected the Ohio state line northeasterly to Detroit, and Division 2 connected Detroit with Mackinaw City. A branch of Division 7 ran north from St. Ignace to Sault Ste. Marie. The system was signposted in 1919, and those highways were marked on maps for the first time. The first M-10 was designated along the highways from Ohio through Detroit to Standish. (Note: Northeast of Standish, M-10 ran along the Lake Huron shoreline.) M-76 connected Standish with Grayling, where the first M-14 ran northward to Cheboygan. From there, M-10 connected to Mackinaw City. In the UP, M-12 connected St. Ignace with Sault Ste. Marie along a route to the east of the old Mackinac Trail. When the United States Numbered Highway System was formed on November 11, 1926, most of these highways were redesignated as part of the national system. From the state line northward, M-10 was included as a part of US 24 and US 25. At Detroit, M-10 was used as a part of US 10. North of Grayling, M-14 was redesignated as a part of US 27. M-12 was used for US 2.

The Michigan State Highway Department (MSHD) (Note: The Michigan State Highway Department was reorganized into the Michigan Department of State Highways and Transportation on August 23, 1973. The name was shortened to its current form in 1978.) rerouted US 2 in 1933 between Rogers Park and Sault Ste. Marie. The new routing followed Mackinac Trail instead of turning east to Cedarville and north to Sault Ste. Marie; the former routing was given the M-121 designation.

=== Turnpikes and freeways ===
By 1945, a divided highway designated Alternate US 24 (US 24A) was opened from the state line north to Erie. After World War II, the MSHD planned to convert several highways in the state to freeways. In planning maps from 1947, the contemporary I-75 corridor was included in the system that later became the Interstate Highway System. It was also included in the General Location of National System of Interstate Highways Including All Additional Routes at Urban Areas Designated in September 1955 that was released in 1955 as the federal government readied plans for the freeway system.

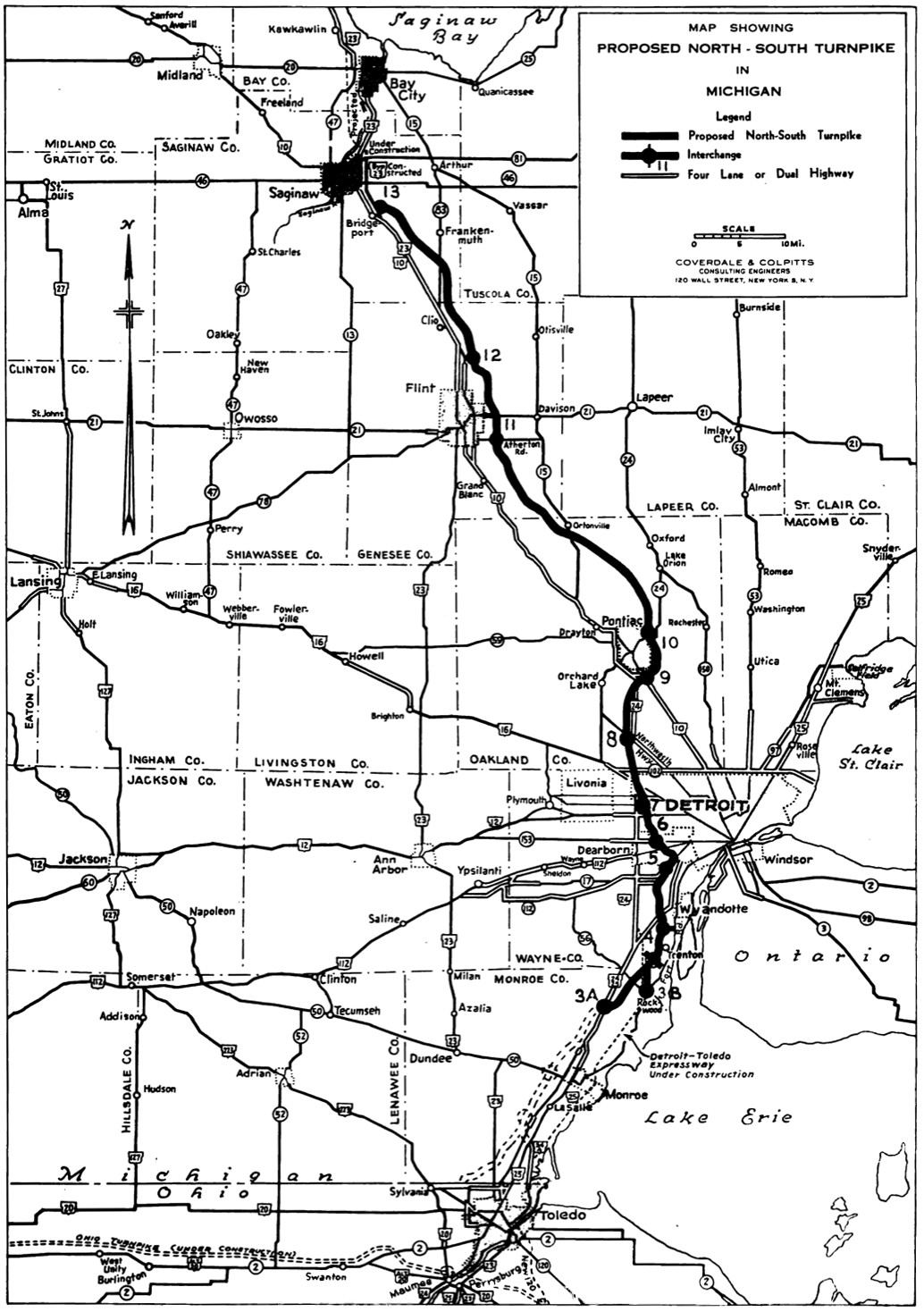
1955 map of the proposed Michigan Turnpike

The Michigan Turnpike Authority (MTA), an agency which was created in 1951, proposed the construction of a toll freeway to run north–south in the state. The original termini for the turnpike were Bridgeport and Rockwood. The state highway commissioner at the time, Charles Ziegler, distrusted a separate agency dealing with statewide road building at the time, and he worked to stall progress on any proposed turnpikes. Ziegler, who had a seat on the MTA board, publicly sparred with authority chairman George Higgins, even announcing that the MSHD would build a parallel freeway that would "reduce tolls on the turnpike 40 to 50 percent" according to consultants. Trucking interests in the state also opposed the projects, preferring a moderate gas tax increase over any tolls. Detroit denied the MTA permission to route a turnpike through the city over issues related to the River Rouge, Rouge Park and access across the right-of-way. After a lawsuit by City of Dearborn, the legislation creating the authority was upheld by the Michigan Supreme Court in 1955, and the authority was allowed to sell bonds for its Bridgeport–Rockwood and Detroit–Chicago toll roads.

The original planning maps plotted the first turnpike to the west of Detroit, running near US 24 (Telegraph Road). This route was later proposed for I-75 itself; I-275 would have been the freeway to loop into downtown Detroit. The proposed length was increased by December 1955; the extended Michigan Turnpike would have run from a connection across the Ohio state line to Toledo north through Detroit and Saginaw and eventually to the southern end of the Mackinac Bridge. By the following April, any extensions were cancelled leaving the turnpike to its original termini; the east–west companion road was also cancelled at that time. The MTA proposed a state constitutional amendment in January 1956 that would allow the Michigan Legislature to issue state-guaranteed bonds for part of the MTA's construction expenses. According to The Wall Street Journal, the authority "struggled for survival" in the face of opposition from the MSHD just two months later; the department's actions impaired the authority's appropriations from the state legislature and its ability to sell the necessary bonds to pay for construction. When the federal government approved the Federal Aid Highway Act of 1956, Ziegler and the MSHD announced plans for a full freeway to run north through the Lower Peninsula and continue across to the Upper Peninsula. This announcement undermined the efforts to build the Michigan Turnpike. By August 1956, the MTA voted to reduce its operations to a skeleton staff, but moved forward in May 1957 on a bond sale to finance construction of the roadway. Financiers stated such a sale was only feasible if the turnpike was to be safe from competition. The Michigan Townships Association called for the abolition of the MTA in 1958. The legislature killed a bill to do so in June 1959, but it later voted to repeal the act that created the authority in 1962.

=== Interstate Highway era ===
The first sections of freeway for I-75 were opened in 1957, beginning with the southern section near the Ohio state line, opened in October 1957. The Mackinac Bridge was opened to traffic on November 1, 1957; a new section of freeway and an interchange connected US 2 to the bridge on the northern end, and to US 27 and US 31 on the southern end. The MSHD formally proposed the I-75 number in 1958. On June 30 of that year, the first stretch of the "Fenton–Clio Expressway" opened. Construction on the Chrysler Freeway in Detroit started on January 30, 1959. The I-75 signs were first installed along the Detroit–Toledo Expressway in October 1959, replacing US 24A signage in the Monroe area, after the state waited for final approval of the numbering system to be used in the state.

Markers such as this one bearing the state name originally used when I-75 was first signed

In November 1960, sections of freeway opened from Indian River north to the southern Mackinac Bridge approaches in Mackinaw City and from St. Ignace to Evergreen Shores, and by December, the section of freeway running between Evergreen Shores and M-123 was scheduled to open.

In 1961, the MSHD had proposed that the section of I-75 south of Detroit to Toledo be built as an electronic highway under a bid through General Motors; the testing for such a roadway was ultimately done at Ohio State University instead. That same year the original Zilwaukee Bridge, a bascule bridge across the Saginaw River was opened, along with a section of freeway north to Kawkawlin. In October 1961, the first segment of I-75 near Grayling opened, connecting M-18 with the city. By the end of the year, the freeway was completed between Kinross and Dafter in the UP, and the former segment of US 27 between Grayling and Gaylord was turned back to local control. After this individual segment of freeway was completed, it left a gap between Gaylord and Indian River that was designated "To I-75" on maps for the former segment of US 27, and US 27 was truncated to about five miles (8.0 km) south of Grayling.

The 12-mile (19 km) section of I-75 was opened between Gaylord and Waters in July 1962. Another temporary To I-75 designation was applied along US 10 and US 27 from Bay City to Grayling. In August, the section between Gaylord and Vanderbilt was completed. On October 25, the section of freeway from M-24 near Pontiac to the Flint area opened. Also late in the year, the freeway gap was filled in between Vanderbilt and Indian River. The International Bridge and its approaches opened in Sault Ste. Marie on October 31, 1962.

The following year, a set of segments opened in the Detroit area. The freeway was extended south from Pontiac to 11 Mile Road with a connection along M-150 to M-102 (8 Mile Road). Another section opened to connect with US 24 (Telegraph Road) in the Woodhaven area; a To I-75 designation was added to connect along US 24 and M-102 to M-150. On the other end of the state, the gaps in the freeway across the UP were completed in 1963 as well, and the section of freeway in Northern Michigan was named the most scenic new highway in the US in 1963 by Parade magazine.

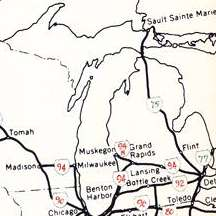
1958 numbering plan for Michigan's Interstates

The first part of the Chrysler Freeway opened to traffic on June 26, 1964, the southern mile (1.6 km) of which was designated I-375. The segment of I-75 through the Downriver suburbs of Detroit between the US 24 (Telegraph Road) connector and M-39 (Southfield Highway) was completed on December 28, 1966. The same year, I-75 was scheduled to open southward from 11 Mile Road to M-102 (8 Mile Road). In 1967, two segments of freeway opened. One was from Kawkawlin to Standish in October, and the other through Detroit extended I-75 along the Fisher Freeway in December. The first section of M-76 freeway from Standish northwesterly to Alger was scheduled to open in July 1968. A one-mile (1.6 km) section of the Chrysler Freeway through Detroit opened on December 19, 1968, and the remainder was scheduled to open on January 10, 1969.

In 1970, I-75 through Detroit was completed, and two additional sections of M-76 were converted to freeway. The northern section ran from the US 27-to-I-75 transition south of Grayling to the Crawford–Roscommon county line, and the second was an extension from Alger to the West Branch area. The first ice-detection system in the state was installed on the River Rouge bridges in the Detroit area in an attempt to maximize driver safety. The next year, the last section of the Chrysler Freeway in Hazel Park was finished when an interchange for the then-unbuilt I-696 was completed. Another segment of the M-76 freeway was completed at the same time, bypassing Roscommon. The final section between Alger and Roscommon was opened on November 1, 1973, in a dedication by Governor William G. Milliken.

=== Since completion ===
Since the freeway was completed in 1973, a few changes have been made to I-75 in Michigan. From 1973 to 1975, I-75 was widened from four to six lanes from south of Flint to north of Bay City.

MDOT truncated US 2 to end in St. Ignace by removing it from the I-75 freeway in 1983. In 1986, US 10 was truncated to Bay City, removing its concurrency with I-75 from there to Clarkston.

In 1988, the original bascule Zilwaukee Bridge across the Saginaw River was replaced by a much higher structure slightly north of the former bridge.

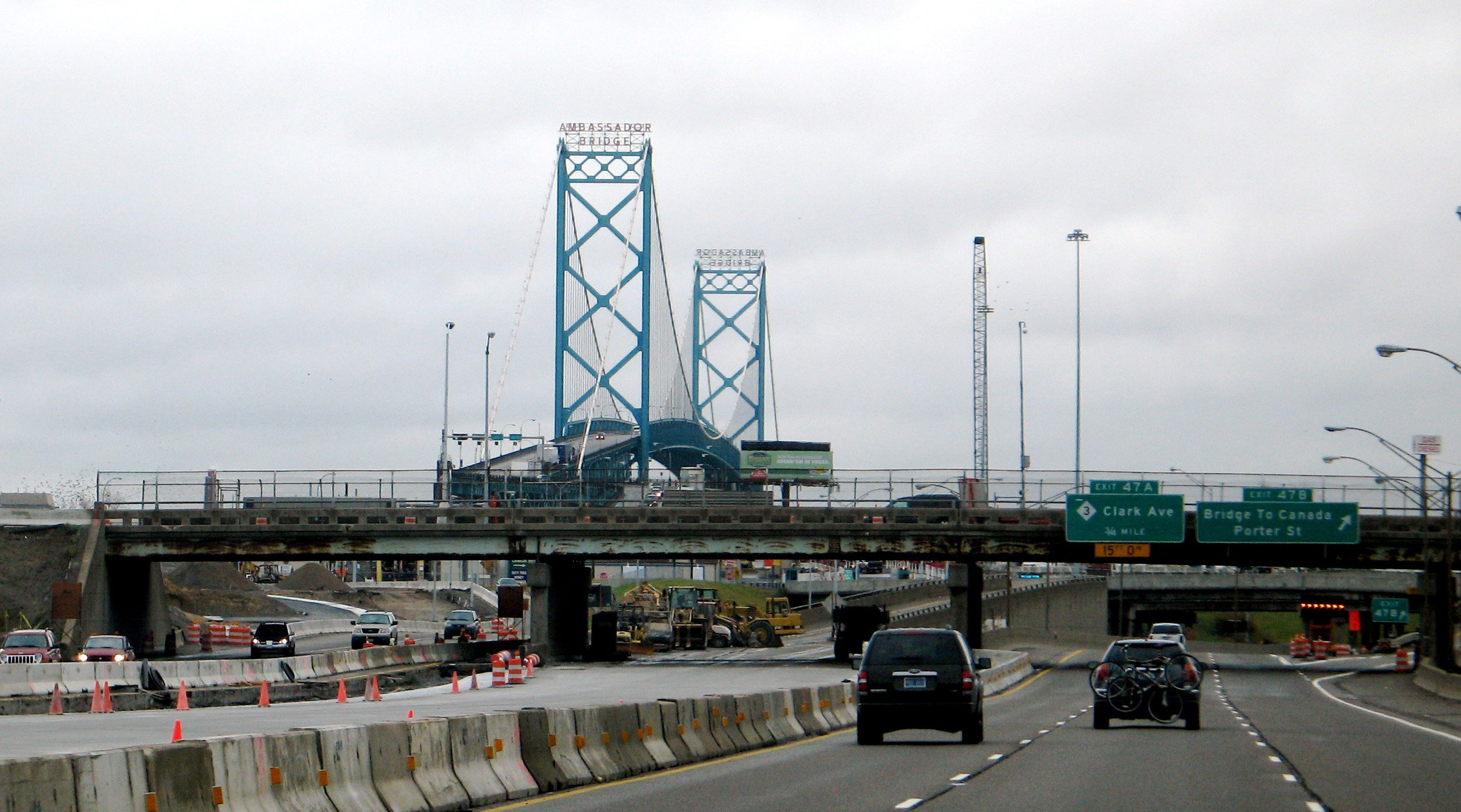
Construction in 2007 during the Gateway Project

Beginning on February 25, 2008, I-75 closed completely to traffic in both directions from Rosa Parks Boulevard (exit 49) to Clark Street (exit 47) in Detroit. This facilitated the complete rebuilding of the road as part of the Ambassador Gateway Project to better connect I-75 and I-96 to the Ambassador Bridge. Through traffic on I-75 was rerouted along I-94 to I-275 and local detours were posted. The freeway reopened to traffic in June 2009, five months ahead of schedule. The overall project to realign and connect the bridge to the freeways was mired in lawsuits between MDOT and the private company that owns the bridge. The company's owner was jailed for contempt of court during court proceedings in early 2012. MDOT was later ordered to assume responsibility for construction, and the department completed the project on September 21, 2012.

All of I-75 within Michigan was named the Tuskegee Airmen Memorial Highway, in honor of the Tuskegee Airmen, at the end of December 2014.

In May 2017, MDOT raised the speed limit on I-75 between Bay City and Sault Ste. Marie, excluding the Mackinac Bridge, from 70 to 75 miles per hour (113 to 121 km/h).

A segment of I-75 in Oakland County between 12 Mile Road in Madison Heights and South Boulevard in Bloomfield Township had high-occupancy vehicle lanes (HOV lanes) added in both directions. One lane of I-75 in both directions will be restricted to HOV traffic from 6 a.m. to 9 a.m. and from 3 p.m. to 6 p.m. The HOV lanes are part of the I-75 Modernization Project, and they opened to traffic on October 24, 2023.

In 2018, MDOT began construction on new ramps to connect to the Gordie Howe International Bridge. A three-mile (4.8 km) stretch of the road was also widened. These replaced the existing slip ramps onto Livernois Avenue. The new ramps and the bridge opened on July 27, 2026.

== Freeway names ==
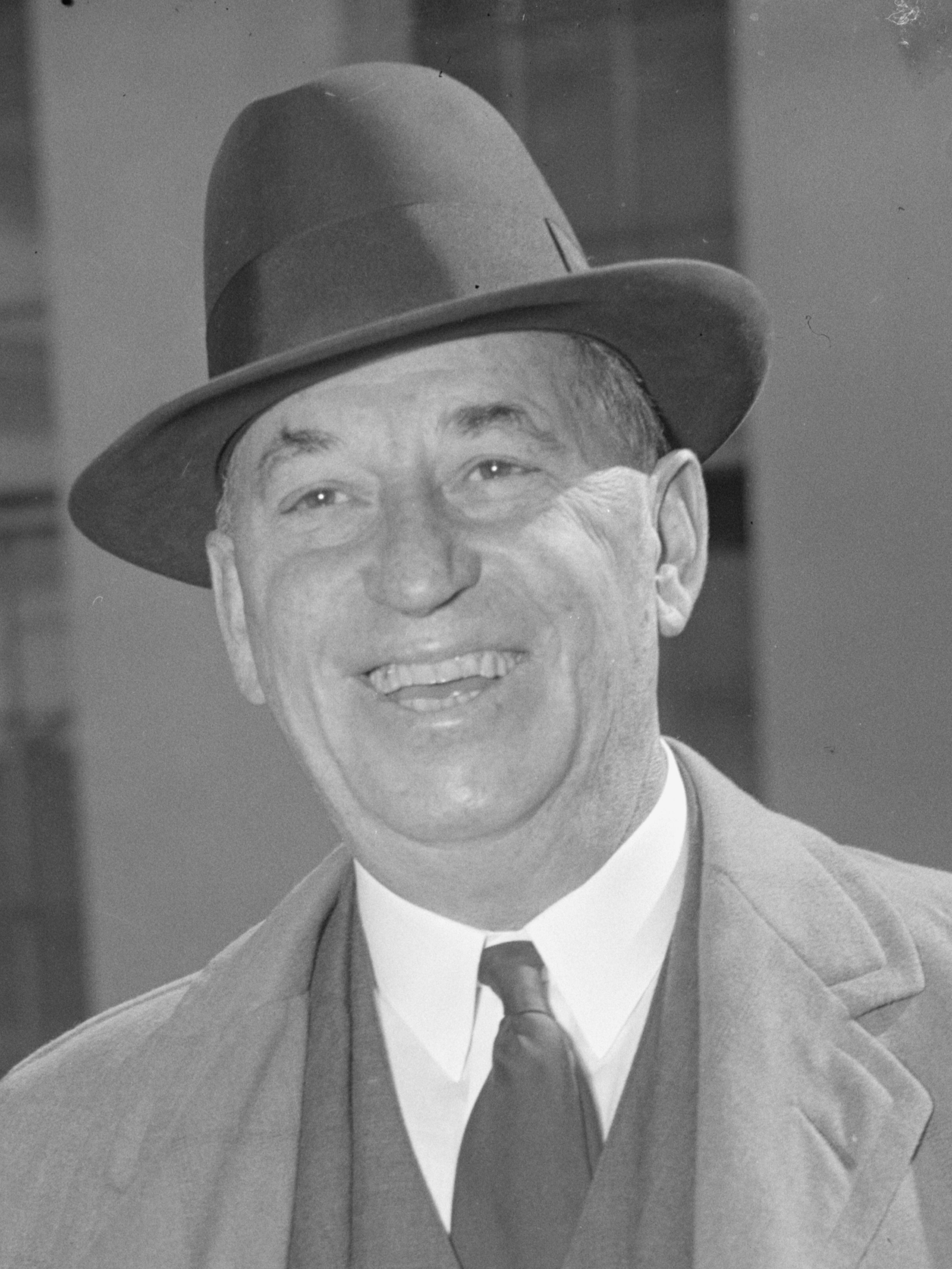
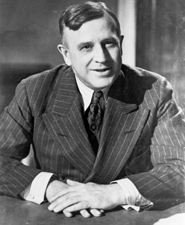
Segments of I-75 in Michigan are named for Walter P. Chrysler (left) and Prentiss M. Brown (right) among others.

I-75 has six named segments in Michigan. The southernmost section from the state line north to the Detroit area is the Detroit–Toledo Expressway. The segment through southern and central Detroit is known as the Fisher Freeway. It was dedicated on September 17, 1970, to the Fisher Brothers, who founded Fisher Body, later a part of General Motors. After the curve in downtown Detroit, I-75 follows the Walter P. Chrysler Freeway northward. That segment is named for Walter P. Chrysler, founder of Chrysler. The name was chosen by the Detroit Common Council on November 6, 1957, and codified in state law in 1990; the state definition for the name places the northern end of the designation at the Oakland–Genesee county line.

Officially, the entire length of I-75 in Michigan is the American Legion Memorial Highway. As a practical matter, this name is not used on the southernmost segments of the Interstate. The American Legion was honored with the designation in 1969 in a state law that required private interests to finance the signage. Public Act 174 of 1984 redesignated I-75 in honor of the group and placed responsibility for signage in MDOT's hands. Another name that was applied to all of I-75 was the Michigan Bicentennial Freedom Way. Designated by Senate Concurrent Resolution 216 of 1975, the name only applied to the freeway in 1976. The designation was formally repealed in 2001.

Two other segments near the Straits of Mackinac were named in 1976 for figures instrumental in the construction of the Mackinac Bridge. From the Cheboygan–Otsego county line north to the bridge, I-75 was named for G. Mennen Williams, the former governor once called "Michigan's Politician of the Century" in the press. The section in Mackinac County from the northern end of the Mackinac Bridge was named for Prentiss M. Brown, the former Congressman and Senator who served on the MBA board until his death in 1971.

== Monumental bridges ==
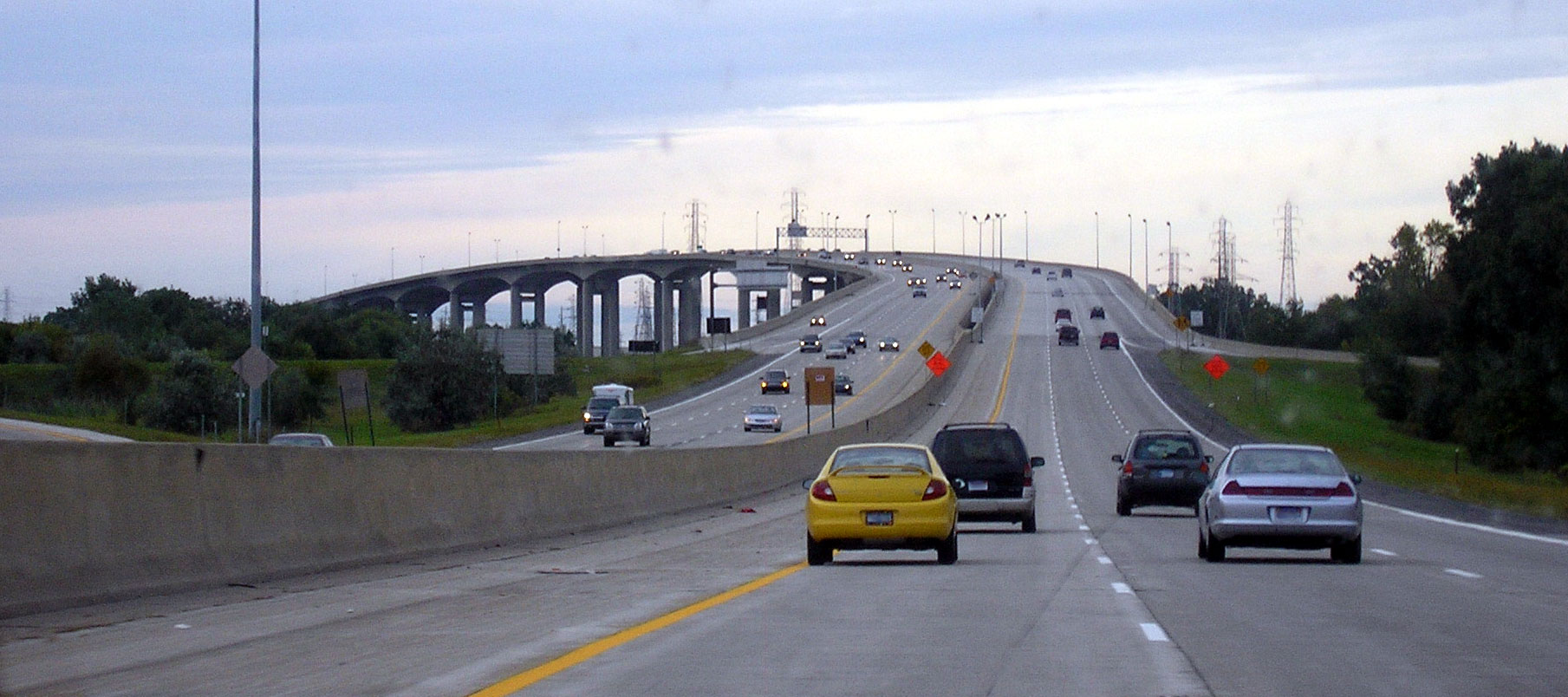
Zilwaukee Bridge

Along its route in the state, I-75 utilizes three of Michigan's monumental bridges. The first of them is the Zilwaukee Bridge near Saginaw. The original bridge across the Saginaw River at Zilwaukee was built in 1960 as a bascule bridge to allow shipping traffic to use the river. Opening the drawbridge would back traffic up on I-75/US 10/US 23 for upwards of four hours on holiday weekends. Approved in 1974, construction on the replacement bridge started in October 1979. A major construction accident in August 1982 delayed completion of the new Zilwaukee Bridge; a bridge pier partially collapsed when contractors overloaded a section under construction. The affected 300-foot (91 m) deck segment tilted to rest three feet (0.91 m) higher on one end and five feet (1.5 m) lower on the other. The structure was originally supposed to cost $76.8 million with a 1983 completion date; in the end it cost $131.3 million (equivalent to $346 million in 2024) when the southbound span finally opened on September 19, 1988. The structure is the largest concrete segmental bridge in the United States.

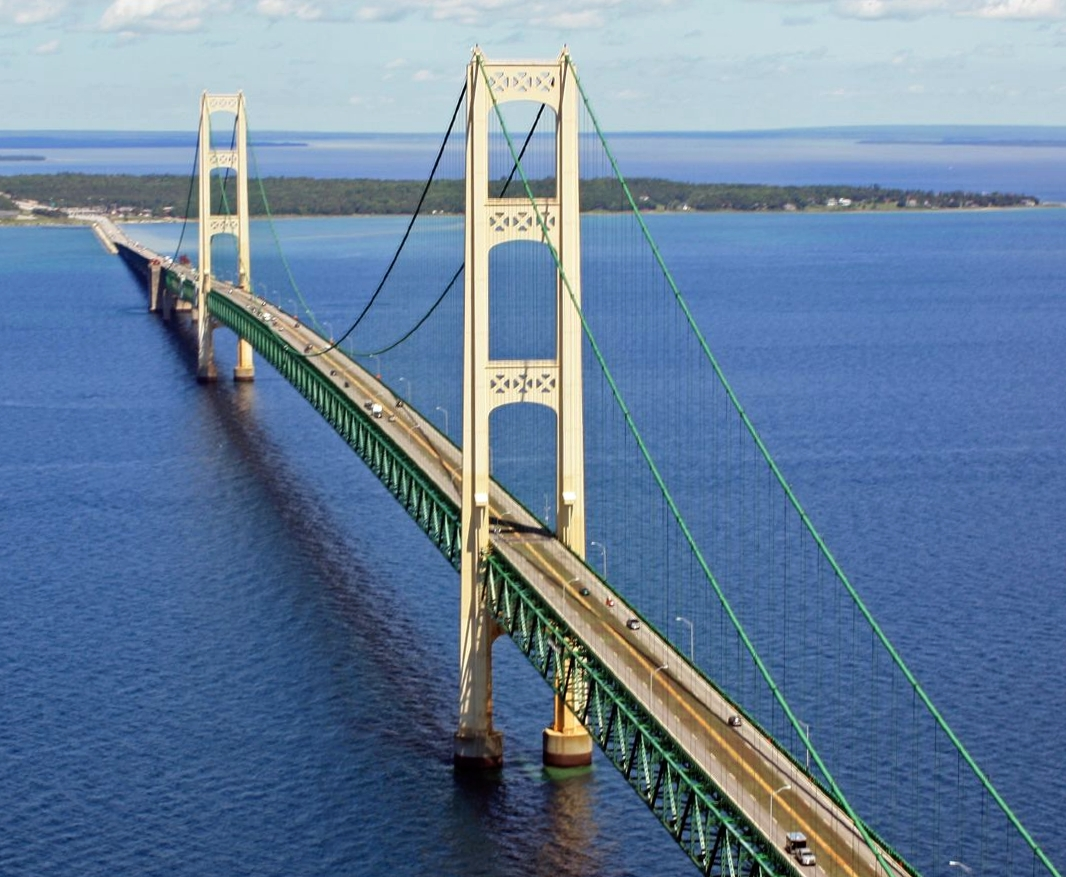
Mackinac Bridge

The second is the Mackinac Bridge that connects Michigan's two peninsulas at the Straits of Mackinac. A structure was first proposed in 1888 by one of the directors of the Grand Hotel on Mackinac Island. Car ferry service was started in 1923 to cross the straits, and a bridge authority was first created in 1934 to investigate the possibility of building a permanent connection across the straits. This early authority started with a 1921 proposal for a series of bridges that would have connected Cheboygan to St. Ignace by way of Bois Blanc, Round, and Mackinac islands. The federal Public Works Administration rejected loan and grant requests for that project. A second, direct crossing was then proposed based on designs used for the Tacoma Narrows Bridge. The collapse of that bridge and World War II delayed any further work on a structure beyond tests of the lake bottom and the construction of the 4,200-foot-long (1,300 m) causeway on the St. Ignace side; the first bridge authority was abolished in 1947. The current agency was created on June 6, 1950.

The MBA was authorized in 1952 to sell bonds to finance construction, which were sold on December 17, 1953, to finance the $99.8 million (equivalent to $932 million in 2024) cost of the bridge. The structure was designed by David B. Steinman and built by Merritt-Chapman & Scott for the substructure and the American Bridge Company division of U.S. Steel Corporation for the superstructure. Construction started in 1954 and the Mackinac Bridge opened to traffic on November 1, 1957. Final work on the bridge was completed in September 1958. Overall, the structure has a 3,800-foot (1,200 m) central suspension span flanked by two 1,800-foot (550 m) side spans. With the two backstay spans, the Mackinac Bridge is 8,614 feet (2,626 m) long between cable anchorages, the longest in the world at the time it opened. (Note: The Akashi Kaikyō and Great Belt bridges in the Eastern Hemisphere are each longer between anchorages at 12,826 feet (3,909 m) and 8,921 feet (2,719 m) respectively, but the Mackinac is still the longest between anchorages in the Western Hemisphere, and crosses a wider body of water.) The total length of the structure is 26,444 feet (8,060 m) with two 555-foot-tall (169 m) towers and 155 feet (47 m) of clearance for passing ships under the main span. In 2000, the bridge was named "Michigan's No. 1 Civil Engineering Project of the 20th Century" by the Michigan Section of the American Society of Civil Engineers (ASCE), and the structure was named a National Historic Civil Engineering Landmark in 2010 by the national ASCE.

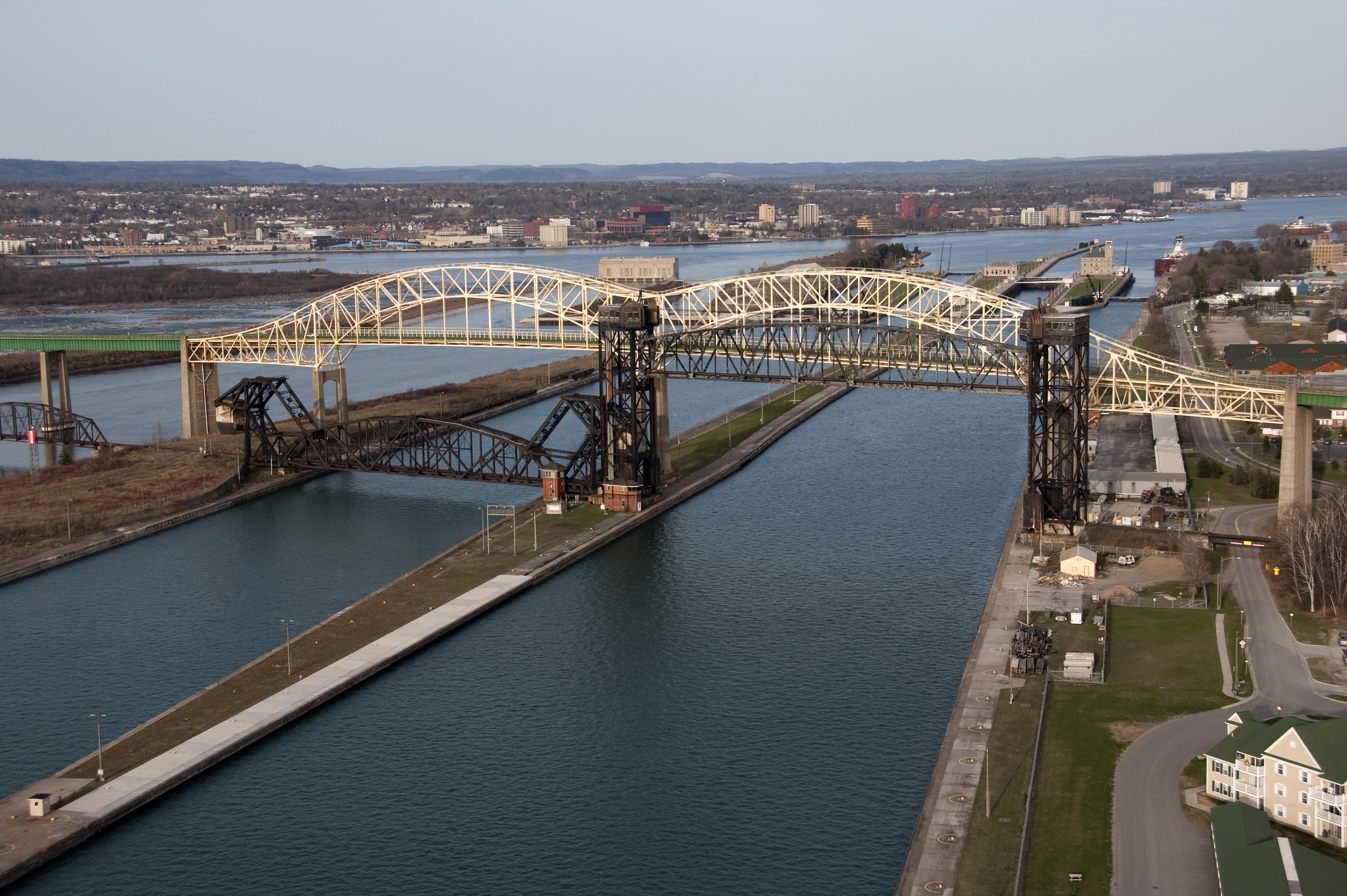
Part of the International Bridge

The northernmost of the three monumental bridges along I-75 is the International Bridge, linking the twin cities of Sault Ste. Marie in Michigan and Ontario. The governments on each side of the international border formed a bridge authority to build a highway bridge in 1935. Construction started on the structure September 16, 1960. The International Bridge is nearly three miles (4.8 km) long, encompassing spans over the American and Canadian navigation channels for the Soo Locks and the St. Marys River. The American approach is 2,471 feet (753 m), and the Canadian approach is 2,942 feet (897 m). The center span over the river is 9,280 feet (2,830 m), flanked by 1,260-foot (380 m) and 830-foot (250 m) spans over the American and Canadian shipping channels, respectively. The bridge was designed by the same firm that handled the Mackinac Bridge for a cost of $20 million (equivalent to $158 million in 2024). It opened to traffic on October 31, 1962.

== Exit list ==
County	Location	mi	km	Exit	Destinations	Notes
Monroe	Erie Township	0.000	0.000		I-75 south / LECT south – Toledo	Ohio state line; LECT continues south into Ohio
Monroe	Erie Township	1.587	2.554	2	Summit Street	Southbound exit and northbound entrance
Monroe	Erie Township	2.547	4.099	2	Erie, Temperance	Northbound exit and southbound entrance; unsigned Connector 75 (Summit Street)
Monroe	Erie Township	4.610	7.419	5	Erie Road – Erie, Temperance	
Monroe	Luna Pier	5.785	9.310	6	Luna Pier	Connects to Luna Pier Road
Monroe	La Salle Township	8.629	13.887	9	South Otter Creek Road – La Salle	
Monroe	Monroe Township	11.357	18.277	11	La Plaisance Road – Downtown Monroe	
Monroe	Monroe	13.452	21.649	13	Front Street – Monroe	
Monroe	Monroe	13.583	21.860	14	Elm Avenue	
Monroe	Frenchtown Township	15.230	24.510	15	Dixie Highway – Downtown Monroe	Former M-50
Monroe	Frenchtown Township	18.040	29.033	18	Nadeau Road	
Monroe	Frenchtown Township	20.310	32.686	20	I-275 north – Flint	To Detroit Metro Airport; southern terminus of I-275
Monroe	Berlin Township	21.463	34.541	21	Swan Creek Road – Newport	To Newport Road
Monroe	South Rockwood	26.342	42.393	26	South Huron River Drive – South Rockwood	
Wayne	Rockwood	26.941	43.357	27	North Huron River Drive – Rockwood	
Wayne	Brownstown Township	27.680	44.547	28	M-85 north / LECT north (Fort Street)	Northbound exit and southbound entrance; southern terminus of M-85 and northern end of LECT concurrency
Wayne	Flat Rock	28.824	46.388	29	Gibraltar, Flat Rock	Signed as exits 29A (Gibraltar) and 29B (Flat Rock) southbound; connects to Gibraltar Road
Wayne	Woodhaven	31.821	51.211	32	West Road – Trenton, Grosse Ile, Woodhaven, Brownstown Township	Signed as exits 32A (east, Trenton, Grosse Ile) and 32B (west, Woodhaven, Brownstown Township)
Wayne	Brownstown Township	33.707– 33.783	54.246– 54.368	34A	Dix–Toledo Highway	Signed as exit 34 northbound
Wayne	Brownstown Township	34.012	54.737	34B	Sibley Road	Southbound exit and northbound entrance; missing connections provided via exit 34A
Wayne	Taylor	34.794	55.996	35	US 24 (Telegraph Road)	Northbound exit to northbound US 24 and southbound entrance from southbound US 24 only; unsigned Connector 240
Wayne	Taylor	35.961	57.874	36	Eureka Road	
Wayne	Taylor–Southgate city line	36.800– 37.311	59.224– 60.046	37	Allen Road, Northline Road	
Wayne	Lincoln Park	39.875	64.173	40	Dix Highway	No access from southbound I-75 to northbound Dix Highway, northbound Dix Highway to southbound I-75, or southbound Dix Highway to northbound I-75
Wayne	Lincoln Park	40.686– 40.711	65.478– 65.518	41	M-39 (Southfield Road)	
Wayne	Melvindale	41.827	67.314	42	Outer Drive	
Wayne	Detroit	42.999	69.200	43	M-85 (Fort Street) / LECT; Schaefer Highway	Southern end of LECT concurrency; signed as exits 43A (Schaefer Highway south, M-85 [Fort Street]) and 43B (Schaefer Highway north) southbound; former northern terminus of M-85
Wayne	Detroit	44.862	72.198	44	Dearborn Street	Northbound exit and southbound entrance
Wayne	Detroit	45.594	73.376	45	M-85 (Fort Street); Springwells Street	
Wayne	Detroit	46.480	74.802	46A	Green Street	Southbound exit and northbound entrance
Wayne	Detroit	46.135– 46.827	74.247– 75.361	46B	(Canada) Gordie Howe International Bridge	Signed as exit 46 northbound (Note: The overpasses opened on July 27, 2026, alongside the Gordie Howe International Bridge itself; replacing a former interchange serving Livernois Avenue that was closed in 2020.)
Wayne	Detroit	47.276	76.083	47A	Campbell Street, Clark Avenue	Campbell Street signed northbound only, Clark Avenue signed southbound only; former M-3
Wayne	Detroit	48.020	77.281	47B	(Canada) Ambassador Bridge; LECT	Northbound exit and southbound entrance; northern end of LECT concurrency; to Highway 3
Wayne	Detroit	48.062	77.348	47C	(United States) Vernor Highway (Canada) Ambassador Bridge	No northbound entrance from Vernor Highway; signed as exits 47C (Vernor Highway) and 47B (Ambassador Bridge) southbound
Wayne	Detroit	47.894– 49.108	77.078– 79.032	48	I-96 west (Jeffries Freeway) to US 12 (Michigan Avenue) / I-94 – Lansing	Eastern terminus of I-96
Wayne	Detroit	49.878– 49.108	80.271– 79.032	49	M-10 (Lodge Freeway) / Rosa Parks Boulevard – Southfield, Huntington Place	Signed as exits 49A (Rosa Parks Boulevard) and 49B (M-10) southbound
Wayne	Detroit	50.171	80.742	50	M-5 (Grand River Avenue)	Access to Comerica Park, Ford Field, Fox Theatre, and Little Caesars Arena
Wayne	Detroit	50.581	81.402	51A	M-1 (Woodward Avenue) / John R. Street / Brush Street	No southbound entrance; exit eliminated in 1999; northbound entrance still exists
Wayne	Detroit	50.717	81.621	51B	M-3 (Gratiot Avenue via Fisher Freeway)	No entrance from northbound M-3
Wayne	Detroit	50.864– 50.896	81.858– 81.909	51C	I-375 south (Chrysler Freeway) – Downtown Detroit	Northern terminus of I-375; 25 mph (40 km/h) speed advisory northbound
Wayne	Detroit	51.551– 51.560	82.963– 82.978	52	Mack Avenue	
Wayne	Detroit	52.291– 52.305	84.154– 84.177	53A	Warren Avenue	
Wayne	Detroit	52.853– 52.870	85.059– 85.086	53B	I-94 (Ford Freeway) – Port Huron, Chicago	Exit 216A on I-94
Wayne	Detroit	53.581	86.230	54	East Grand Boulevard, Clay Avenue	
Wayne	Hamtramck	54.212– 54.941	87.246– 88.419	55	Holbrook Avenue, Caniff Avenue	
Wayne	Detroit	55.965– 55.977	90.067– 90.086	56	M-8 (Davison Freeway)	Signed as exits 56A (east) and 56B (west)
Wayne	Detroit	56.741– 56.752	91.316– 91.333	57	McNichols Road	
Wayne	Detroit	57.822	93.055	58	7 Mile Road	
Wayne–Oakland county line	Detroit–Hazel Park city line	58.811– 58.819	94.647– 94.660	59	M-102 (8 Mile Road)	
Oakland	Hazel Park	59.918– 60.104	96.429– 96.728	60	John R. Road, 9 Mile Road	
Oakland	Hazel Park–Ferndale– Madison Heights–Royal Oak city quadripoint	61.183– 61.207	98.464– 98.503	61	I-696 (Reuther Freeway) – Port Huron, Lansing	Exit 18 on I-696
Oakland	Royal Oak–Madison Heights city line	62.189	100.083	62	11 Mile Road	
Oakland	Madison Heights	63.180	101.678	63	12 Mile Road	Southern end of HOV lanes
Oakland	Madison Heights–Troy city line	65.211	104.947	65	14 Mile Road	
Oakland	Troy	67.429	108.516	67	Rochester Road	
Oakland	Troy	68.972	111.000	69	Big Beaver Road	
Oakland	Troy	71.593	115.218	72	Crooks Road	Indirect access to Crooks Road via trumpet interchange with Corporate Drive
Oakland	Bloomfield Township	74.138	119.314	74	Adams Road	
Oakland	Bloomfield Township	75.179– 76.063	120.989– 122.412	75	BL I-75 north (Square Lake Road)	Signed only as Square Lake Road southbound; southern terminus of BL I-75; northern end of HOV lanes at South Boulevard
Oakland	Auburn Hills	77.351– 77.369	124.484– 124.513	77	M-59 – Utica, Pontiac	Signed as exits 77A (east) and 77B (west); exit 40 on M-59
Oakland	Auburn Hills	78.547	126.409	78	Chrysler Drive	Access to Featherstone Road
Oakland	Auburn Hills	79.040	127.203	79	University Drive – Rochester	
Oakland	Auburn Hills	80.994	130.347	81	BL I-75 south – Pontiac M-24 north – Lapeer	Signed as only M-24 northbound; double trumpet interchange; northern terminus of BL I-75 and southern terminus of M-24
Oakland	Auburn Hills	82.911	133.432	83	Joslyn Road	Signed as exits 83A (north) and 83B (south) southbound; east entrance to Great Lakes Crossing Outlets
Oakland	Auburn Hills	84.128	135.391	84	Baldwin Road	Signed as exits 84A (north) and 84B (south) northbound; west entrance to Great Lakes Crossing Outlets
Oakland	Independence Township	88.752	142.832	89	Sashabaw Road	Signed as exits 89A (north) and 89B (south) northbound
Oakland	Independence Township	90.812	146.148	91	M-15 – Clarkston, Davison	
Oakland	Springfield Township	92.653	149.111	93	US 24 south (Dixie Highway) – Waterford	Northern terminus of US 24
Oakland	Springfield Township	97.995	157.708	98	East Holly Road	
Oakland	Groveland–Holly township line	100.963	162.484	101	Grange Hall Road – Fenton, Ortonville	
Oakland–Genesee county line	Holly–Grand Blanc township line	105.941– 106.308	170.496– 171.086	106	Dixie Highway; Saginaw Road	Indirect access in opposing directions via Michigan lefts; signed as Dixie Highway southbound and Saginaw Road northbound
Genesee	Grand Blanc Township	108.676	174.897	108	Holly Road – Grand Blanc	
Genesee	Grand Blanc Township	109.905	176.875	109	M-54 north (Dort Highway) – Burton	Southern terminus of M-54
Genesee	Grand Blanc Township	111.622– 111.899	179.638– 180.084	111	I-475 north – Downtown Flint	Northbound exit and southbound entrance; southern terminus of I-475
Genesee	Mundy Township	115.017– 115.335	185.102– 185.614	115	US 23 south – Ann Arbor	Southern end of US 23 concurrency; southbound exit and northbound entrance
Genesee	Flint	116.334	187.221	116	Bristol Road – Bishop International Airport	Signed as exits 116A (east) and 116B (west, Bishop Airport) southbound; former M-121
Genesee	Flint Township	117.221– 117.662	188.649– 189.359	117	I-69 / Miller Road – Port Huron, Lansing	Signed as exits 117A (I-69) and 117B (Miller Road); combined ramp southbound; exit 133 on I-69
Genesee	Flint Township	118.756	191.119	118	M-21 (Corunna Road) – Owosso	
Genesee	Mount Morris Township	121.968	196.288	122	Pierson Road – Flushing	
Genesee	Mount Morris Township	123.972	199.514	—	Coldwater Road	Interchange eliminated in 1967
Genesee	Mount Morris Township	125.191– 125.846	201.475– 202.530	125	I-475 south – Downtown Flint	Northern terminus of I-475
Genesee	Mount Morris Township	125.992	202.764	126	Mt. Morris	Connects to Mt. Morris Road
Genesee	Vienna Township	130.078	209.340	131	M-57 – Clio, Montrose	
Saginaw	Birch Run	136.159	219.127	136	M-54 south / M-83 north – Birch Run, Frankenmuth	Northern terminus of M-54; southern terminus of M-83; Frankenmuth signed northbound only
Saginaw	Bridgeport Township	144.562	232.650	144	Frankenmuth, Bridgeport	Signed as exits 144A (Frankenmuth) and 144B (Bridgeport) northbound; connects to Dixie Highway
Saginaw	Buena Vista Township	149.285	240.251	149	M-46 – Sandusky, Buena Vista	
Saginaw	Buena Vista Township	149.593	240.747	150	I-675 north – Downtown Saginaw	Southern terminus of I-675
Saginaw	Buena Vista Township	151.765	244.242	151	M-81 – Caro, Reese	
Saginaw	Buena Vista Township	152.977	246.193	153	M-13 (East Bay City Road) – Saginaw	
Saginaw	Saginaw River	152.612– 154.144	245.605– 248.071	Zilwaukee Bridge		
Saginaw	Zilwaukee	153.641	247.261	—	Westervelt Road	Closed c. 1983 during construction of Zilwaukee Bridge and replaced with Adams Street exit
Saginaw	Zilwaukee	153.922	247.713	154	Zilwaukee	Connects to Adams Street
Saginaw	Zilwaukee Township	154.849– 154.875	249.205– 249.247	155	I-675 south – Downtown Saginaw	Northern terminus of I-675
Bay	Frankenlust Township	160.218	257.846	160	M-84 (Westside Saginaw Road)	
Bay	Monitor Township	162.699– 162.711	261.839– 261.858	162	US 10 west – Midland M-25 east (BS I-75) – Downtown Bay City	Eastern terminus of US 10; western terminus of BS I-75/M-25; signed as exits 162A (east) and 162B (west); exit 140 on US 10
Bay	Monitor Township	163.983	263.905	164	Conn. M-13 north / Wilder Road – Kawkawlin	Northbound exit and southbound entrance; northbound access to Wilder Road; southern terminus of Conn. M-13
Bay	Monitor Township	164.775	265.180	164	Wilder Road	Southbound exit and northbound entrance; southbound access to Conn. M-13
Bay	Kawkawlin Township	168.945	271.891	168	Beaver Road	
Bay	Fraser Township	173.912	279.884	173	Linwood Road	
Bay	Pinconning Township	181.927	292.783	181	Pinconning Road	
Arenac	Lincoln Township	188.476– 188.518	303.323– 303.390	188	US 23 north – Alpena, Standish	Northern end of US 23 concurrency
Arenac	Lincoln Township	190.885	307.200	190	M-61 – Gladwin, Standish	
Arenac	Adams Township	195.009	313.837	195	Sterling Road	
Arenac	Moffatt Township	202.817	326.402	202	M-33 north – Alger, Rose City	Southern terminus of M-33
Ogemaw	Horton Township	212.118	341.371	212	BL I-75 north (Cook Road) – West Branch	Southern terminus of BL I-75; BL I-75 signed northbound only
Ogemaw	Ogemaw Township	215.670	347.087	215	M-55 east / BL I-75 south to M-30 – Tawas City, West Branch	Eastern end of M-55 concurrency; northern terminus of BL I-75; BL I-75 signed southbound only
Roscommon	Richfield Township	222.821	358.596	222	Old 76 – St. Helen	Former M-76
Roscommon	Backus Township	227.578	366.251	227	M-55 west to F-97 – Cadillac, Houghton Lake	Western end of M-55 concurrency; Houghton Lake signed northbound only
Roscommon	Higgins Township	239.631	385.649	239	M-18 / BL I-75 north – Roscommon, South Higgins Lake State Park, Houghton Lake, Gladwin	Southern terminus of BL I-75; BL I-75, South Higgins Lake State Park, and Roscommon signed northbound only, Gladwin and Houghton Lake signed southbound only
Roscommon–Crawford county line	Gerrish–Beaver Creek township line	244.243	393.071	244	BL I-75 south – Roscommon, North Higgins Lake State Park	Northern terminus of BL I-75; North Higgins Lake State Park signed northbound only, BL I-75 and Roscommon signed southbound only
Crawford	Beaver Creek Township	250.155	402.585	249	US 127 south – Lansing, Clare	Southbound exit and northbound entrance only; northern terminus of US 127
Crawford	Beaver Creek–Grayling township line	251.020	403.978	251	4 Mile Road	
Crawford	Grayling	254.028	408.818	254	BL I-75 north to M-72 – Downtown Grayling, Traverse City	Northbound exit and southbound entrance only; southern terminus of BL I-75
Crawford	Grayling	256.131	412.203	256	North Down River Road	Southbound exit and northbound entrance
Crawford	Grayling Township	259.191	417.127	259	M-93 / BL I-75 south (Hartwick Pines Road) to M-72 – Downtown Grayling, Traverse City	Signed as only M-93 (Hartwick Pines Road) northbound; northern terminus of BL I-75
Crawford	Maple Forest Township	264.224	425.227	264	Frederic, Lewiston	Connects to CR 612
Otsego	Otsego Lake Township	270.818	435.839	270	Waters	Connects to Marlette Road
Otsego	Bagley Township	279.067	449.115	279	BL I-75 north (Old 27) – Downtown Gaylord	Former US 27; signed as only Old 27 southbound; southern terminus of BL I-75
Otsego	Gaylord	281.953	453.759	282	M-32 / BL I-75 south – Downtown Gaylord, Alpena	Signed as only M-32 northbound; northern terminus of BL I-75
Otsego	Vanderbilt	290.707	467.848	290	Vanderbilt	Connects to Old US 27 (Mill Street); eastern terminus of C-48
Cheboygan	Nunda Township	300.967	484.359	301	C-58 – Wolverine	
Cheboygan	Indian River	310.156	499.148	310	M-68 – Indian River, Rogers City	
Cheboygan	Indian River	313.646	504.764	313	M-27 north – Topinabee, Cheboygan	Southern terminus of M-27
Cheboygan	Munro Township	322.524	519.052	322	C-64 – Cheboygan, Pellston	
Cheboygan	Hebron Township	326.726	525.815	326	C-66 – Cheboygan, Cross Village	
Cheboygan	Mackinaw Township	335.632	540.147	336	US 31 south / LMCT south – Petoskey, Charlevoix	Southbound exit and northbound entrance; northern terminus of US 31 and southern end of LMCT concurrency
Cheboygan–Emmet county line	Mackinaw–Wawatam township line	337.750	543.556	337	Nicolet Street – Mackinaw City	Northbound exit and southbound entrance; southern terminus of the former M-108
Emmet	Mackinaw City	338.434	544.657	338	US 23 south / LHCT south – Cheboygan, Alpena	Southbound exit and northbound entrance; northern terminus of US 23; southern end of LHCT, signed as the GLCT from here north
Emmet	Mackinaw City	338.754	545.172	338	Michigan Welcome Center	Northbound exit only; connects to Nicolet Street
Emmet	Mackinaw City	339.234	545.944	339	Jamet Street	Right-in/right-out interchange; signed only as Mackinaw City southbound
Straits of Mackinac		339.252– 343.349	545.973– 552.567	Mackinac Bridge (tolled)		
Mackinac	St. Ignace	343.662	553.070	343	Bridge View	Southbound exit only; connects to Densmore Avenue
Mackinac	St. Ignace	344.228	553.981	344	US 2 west / LMCT west – Manistique, Escanaba BL I-75 north / LHCT north – St. Ignace	Northern end of GLCT (LHCT, LMCT) concurrency; signed as exits 344A (north) and 344B (west) northbound; BL I-75 not signed southbound; eastern terminus of the western US segment of US 2; southern terminus of BL I-75; LMCT follows exit 344A to US 2 and LHCT follows exit 344B to BL I-75
Mackinac	St. Ignace	344.936	555.121	345	Portage Street	Southbound exit and northbound entrance
Mackinac	St. Ignace Township	347.938	559.952	348	BL I-75 south / LHCT – St. Ignace H-63 north / Mackinac Trail	Southern end of LHCT concurrency; signed as BL I-75 southbound and H-63 northbound; northern terminus of BL I-75 and southern terminus of H-63
Mackinac	St. Ignace Township	352.004	566.496	352	M-123 north – Newberry, Moran, Trout Lake	Southern terminus of M-123
Mackinac	St. Ignace Township	359.233	578.129	359	M-134 east / LHCT east – De Tour Village, Drummond Island	Northern end of LHCT concurrency; western terminus of M-134
Chippewa	Rudyard Township	373.587	601.230	373	M-48 east (H-40) – Pickford, Rudyard	Western terminus of M-48
Chippewa	Kinross Township	377.753	607.935	378	M-80 east – Kinross	Western terminus of M-80
Chippewa	Kinross Township	379.520	610.778	379	Gaines Highway	
Chippewa	Dafter Township	386.166	621.474	386	M-28 / LSCT west – Newberry, Munising	Southern end of LSCT concurrency
Chippewa	Sault Ste. Marie	392.473	631.624	392	BS I-75 north (3 Mile Road) / LHCT – Sault Ste. Marie	Southern end of LHCT concurrency signed as GLCT concurrency
Chippewa	Sault Ste. Marie	394.649	635.126	394	Easterday Avenue – Sault Ste. Marie, Soo Locks	
Chippewa	Sault Ste. Marie	394.826	635.411	Toll Plaza		
Chippewa	Sault Ste. Marie	394.910	635.546	U.S. Customs (southbound)		
St. Marys River		395.035– 395.916	635.747– 637.165	International Bridge (tolled) to Canada		
1.000 mi = 1.609 km; 1.000 km = 0.621 mi: Closed/former; Concurrency terminus; Incomplete access; Tolled; Unopened

== Related trunklines ==
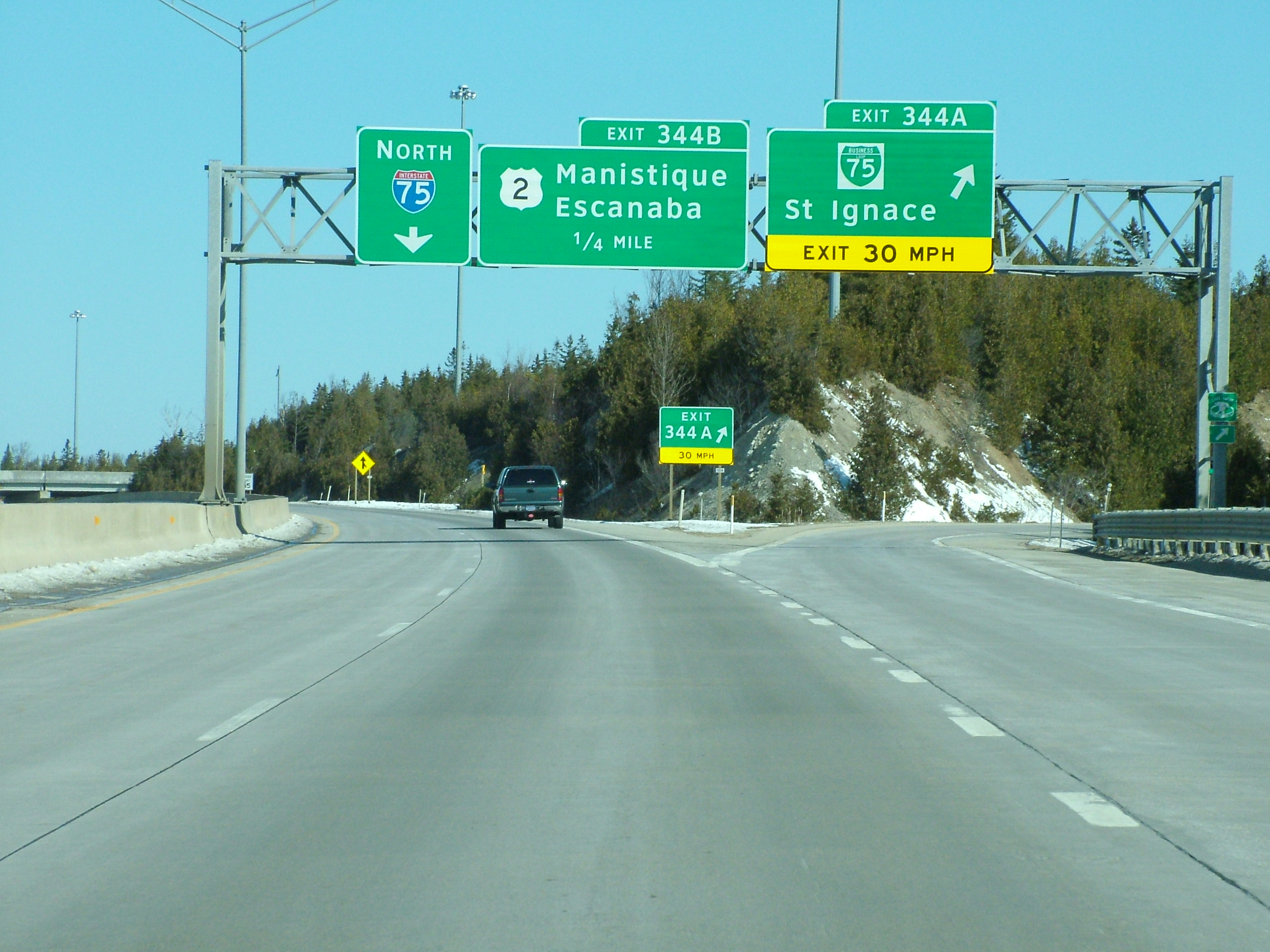
Southern end of the business loop for St. Ignace

There are four auxiliary Interstate Highways for I-75 in Michigan. I-275 begins as a loop from northern Monroe County and continues to connect with I-96 and I-696. The freeway serves the population of western Wayne County and Detroit Metropolitan Wayne County Airport. The highway was originally intended to connect with I-75 north of Pontiac. I-375 was the shortest signed Interstate in the nation; (Note: I-375 was the shortest signed Interstate Highway until I-110 was signed in 2010; I-878 and I-315 in New York City and Great Falls, Montana, are shorter, but unsigned.) it serves the immediate downtown Detroit area. I-475 is known as the UAW Freeway and the David Dunbar Buick Freeway. This freeway serves Flint's downtown areas as I-75 goes to the west side of the city. The fourth auxiliary Interstate is I-675, a loop into the city of Saginaw that served as an alternate to I-75 when the drawbridge over the Saginaw River was still operating.

In addition to the auxiliary Interstates, there are eight current business routes related to the freeway in the state. These business loops and spurs provide signed connections into the downtowns of Pontiac, Bay City, West Branch, Roscommon, Grayling, Gaylord, St. Ignace, and Sault Ste. Marie. A ninth highway was previously designated in Saginaw as well. A 10th business route has been proposed for Indian River.

== Notes ==
Interstate 75
Previous state: Ohio	Michigan	Next state: Terminus
