= Zilwaukee Bridge =

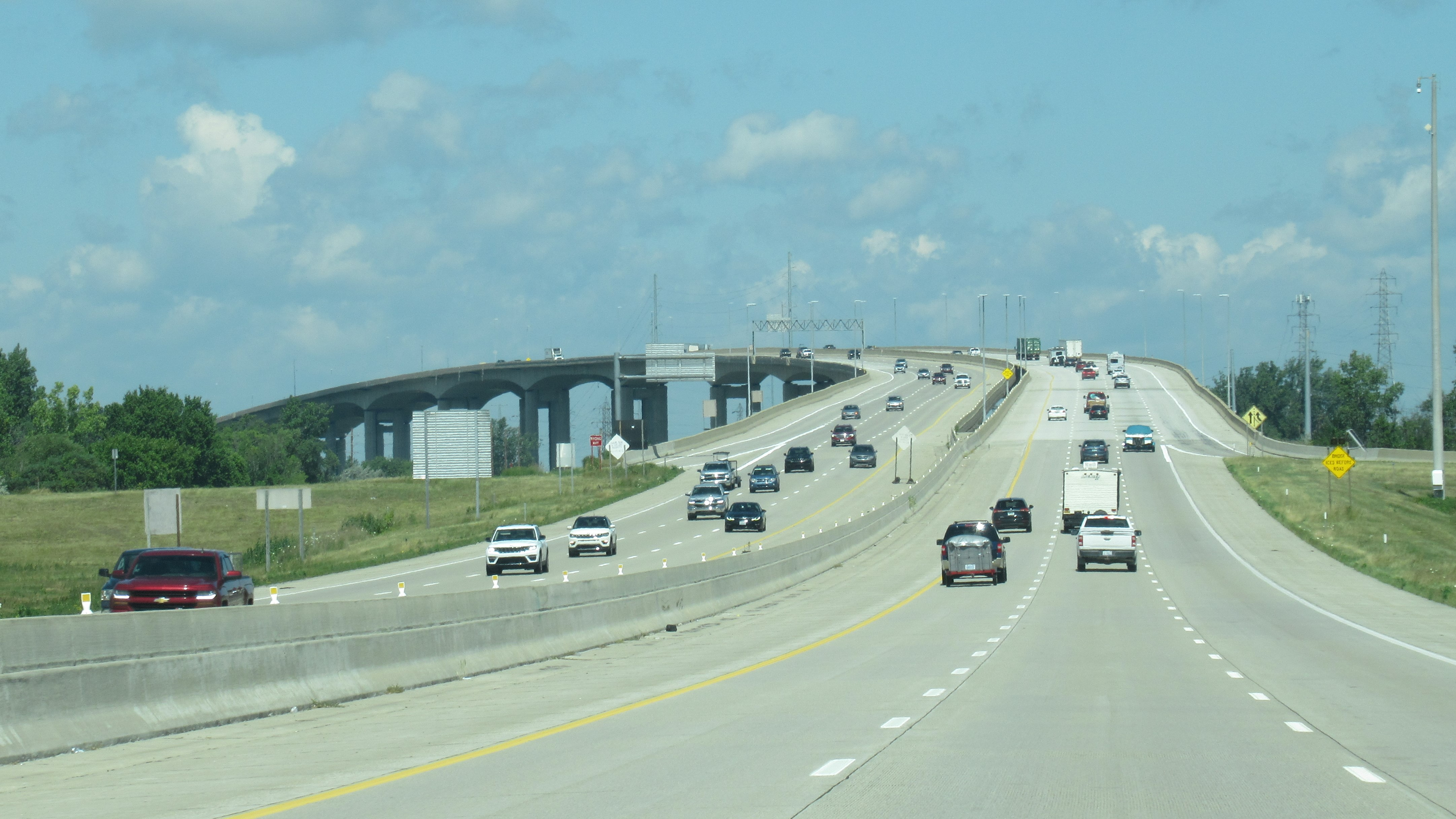
- Approaching the bridge going northbound
- Coordinates: 43°28′56″N 83°54′46″W
- Carries: 8 lanes of I-75 / US 23
- Crosses: Saginaw River
- Locale: Zilwaukee and Zilwaukee Township, Michigan
- Official name: Zilwaukee Bridge
- Maintained by: Michigan Department of Transportation
- ID number: 73173112000B031 NB; 73173112000B032 SB
- Preceded by: Zilwaukee Drawbridge (1960)

Characteristics
- Design: Segmental bridge
- Total length: 8,061 ft (2,457.0 m) NB; 8,085 ft (2,464.3 m) SB
- Width: 74 ft (22.7 m)
- Height: 125 ft (38 m)
- Longest span: 392 ft (119.5 m)
- No. of spans: 26 NB, 25 SB
- Load limit: MS 22.5
- Clearance below: 36.5 m (120 ft)

History
- Construction start: late 1979
- Construction end: September 19, 1988
- Opened: December 23, 1987

Statistics
- Daily traffic: 23,450 vehicles

Location
- Interactive map of Zilwaukee Bridge

The Zilwaukee Bridge is a high-level, segmental concrete bridge spanning the Saginaw River in the U.S. state of Michigan. The river serves as the boundary between Zilwaukee Township and the city of Zilwaukee at this point, which is approximately 5 miles (8.0 km) north of downtown Saginaw. It carries Interstate 75 and US 23.

The current eight-lane structure, completed in 1988, is the second such bridge at this location, replacing a four-lane bascule bridge constructed in 1960. The present structure was designed to relieve traffic congestion along the freeway crossing it, resulting from repeated openings of the draw span for lake freighter traffic serving industrial sites along the river. The Zilwaukee Bridge is approximately 8,000 feet (2,400 m) in length and rises 125 feet (38 m) at its highest point.

== History ==
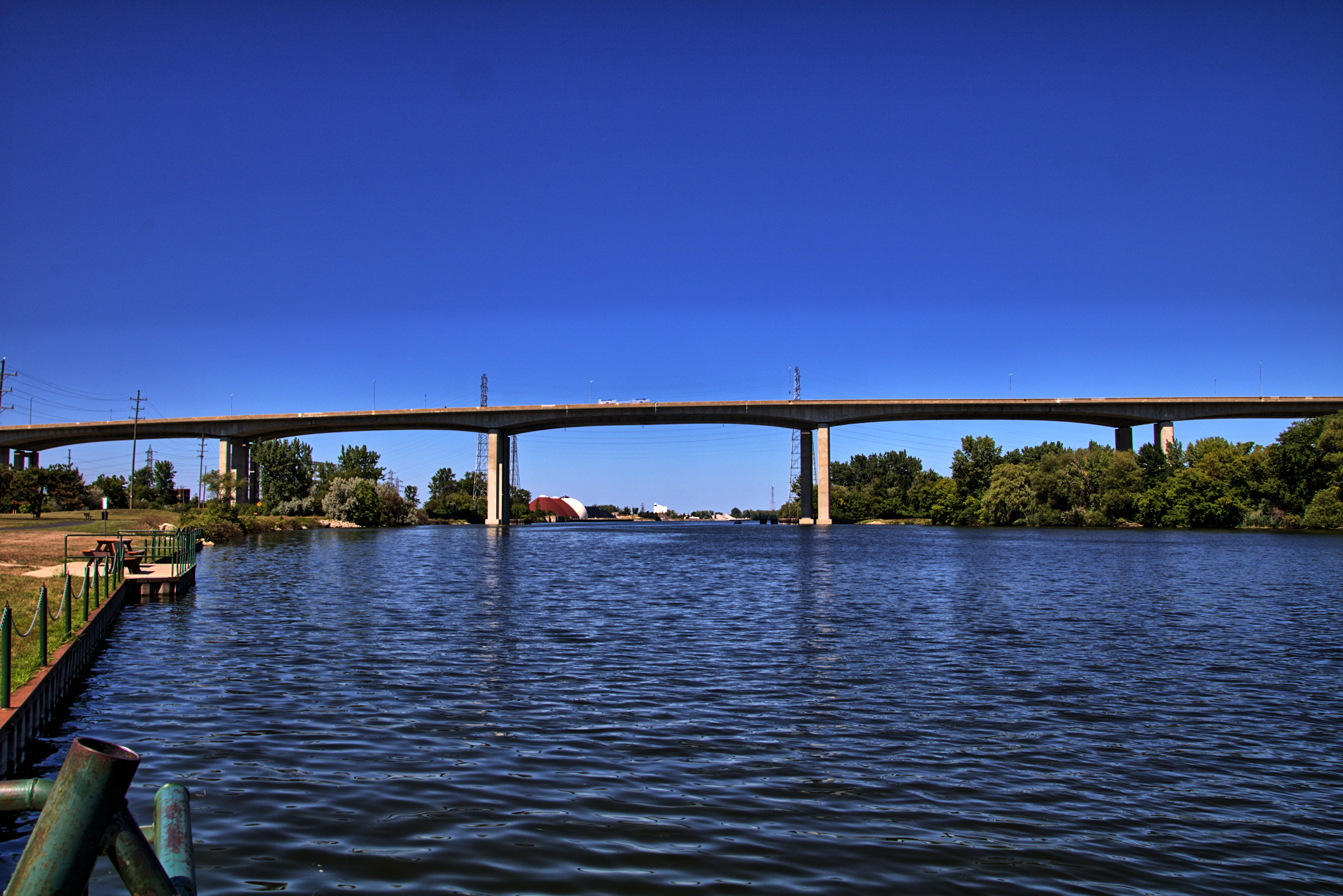
Zilwaukee Bridge as seen from Zilwaukee Riverfront Park

Construction of Interstate 75 and US 23 through Saginaw County was completed in 1960. A crossing of the Saginaw River was formed by extending the highway north from the end of an eastern bypass of Saginaw originally built in 1950, crossing the river with a four-lane bascule bridge. The need for a replacement of the original structure became acute soon after it was completed, as the bridge opening frequently backed up traffic for several miles along Interstate 75, and many cargo ships crashed into the bridge's piers after navigating a sharp bend in the river just before the bridge. These complications led to proposals for a replacement bridge with a higher span.

Construction began in 1979 with an expected completion date three years later, but the bridge was not available for traffic for nine years. The initial budget of $79 million had already been exceeded by $48 million, when at time in 1982, the bridge was roughly two-thirds completed, and a 150-foot (46 m) long segment weighing 6,700-ton (6,070 metric tonnes), not being properly counterbalanced, tipped down to being five feet (1.5 m) out of alignment, with the other end rising 3.5 feet (1.1 m). A pier footing cracked, presumably due to resulting stress. Once repairs were made, a new contractor was hired to complete the bridge once the initial contractor (Stevin Construction) and the state agreed to terminate their contract in exchange for both sides dropping their lawsuits over the accident. The new contractor developed a method of heating the concrete to allow construction during the winter. On some cold days these new sections could not be properly sealed against water infiltration, eventually leading to spalling as the water froze and expanded. Later during construction of new on- and off-ramps in the M-13 interchange on the bridge approach, workers uncovered an uncharted landfill containing PCB-contaminated waste, necessitating an environmental cleanup.

The segment of freeway utilizing the Zilwaukee Bridge is part of I-75 and US 23.

Many Michiganders consider the bridge to be the start of Up North.

== Interstate 675 ==
I-675 was built, in part, to help traffic bypass the original drawbridge while the current high-level Zilwaukee Bridge was being proposed and constructed, in addition to providing better access into and through downtown Saginaw. During bridge maintenance, I-675 is used as a detour route for traffic.

== Maintenance ==
In April 2008, work crews replacing bridge bearings unexpectedly drilled into several reinforcing steel bars in the bridge. The $3.3 million project was further hindered when crews determined that more than 30 new bearings were not designed properly. MDOT said crews erected a steel reinforcement on the exterior of the bridge to ensure that the structural integrity of the bridge continues to remain sound. On October 21, 2008, the bridge opened up to north and southbound traffic once again.

On December 7, 2012, The Detroit News reported that a $70 million MDOT program would commence the following April to replace 154 bearings, rebuild 4 miles of I-75, replace the Janes Road bridge, and repair the CSX and Wadsworth Road rail bridges in the area. The work was completed in 2015 and was expected to extend the life of the bridge until 2087. During 2014, special custom-made jacks were put into place as a stop-gap measure while bearings were replaced.
