= Gephyrophobia =

Anxiety disorder or phobia characterized by fear of bridges

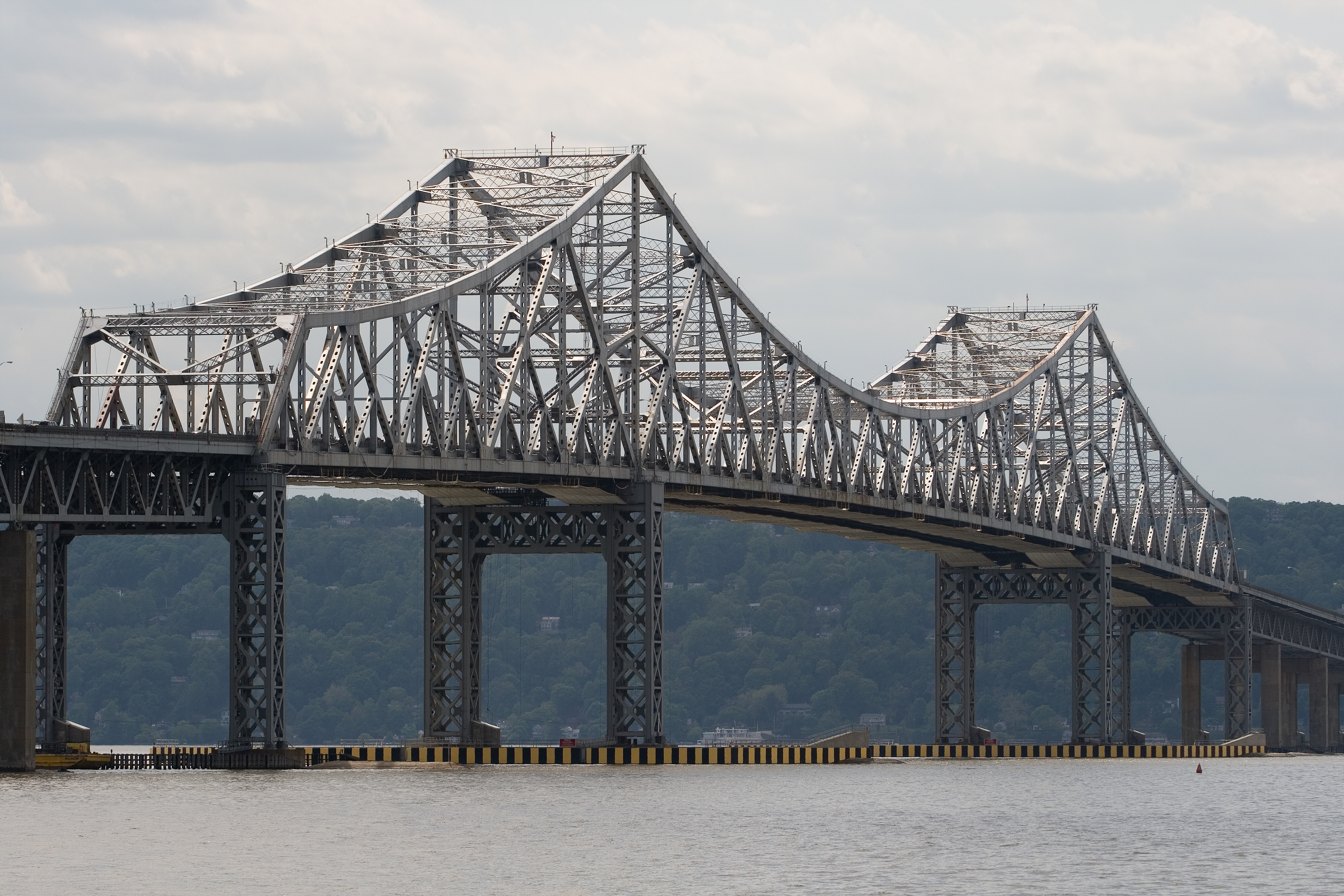
- The old Tappan Zee Bridge (demolished in 2019 and replaced with a newer bridge) offered a service to help those with gephyrophobia cross the bridge without hesitation.
- Specialty: Psychology, psychiatry, and neurology

Gephyrophobia is the anxiety disorder or specific phobia characterized by the fear of bridges and tunnels, especially those that are older. As a result, sufferers of gephyrophobia may avoid routes that will take them over bridges, or if they are a passenger, will act very apprehensively when passing over a bridge. The term gephyrophobia comes from the Greek γέφυρα (gephura), meaning "bridge", and φόβος (phobos), meaning "fear".

Some possible manifestations of gephyrophobia may be fear of driving off the bridge, fear of a gust of wind blowing one off the bridge, or fear that the bridge will collapse while crossing it (i.e., fear that the bridge lacks structural integrity). The fear overlaps with acrophobia (the fear of heights) as gephyrophobia tends to be exacerbated on taller bridges as compared to those closer to the water or ground beneath.

Dr. Michael Liebowitz, founder of the Anxiety Disorders Clinic at the New York State Psychiatric Institute, says, "It's not an isolated phobia, but usually part of a larger constellation ... It's people who get panic attacks. You get light-headed, dizzy; your heart races. You become afraid that you'll feel trapped." It is a situational phobia.

As of 2008, the New York State Thruway Authority would lead gephyrophobiacs over the Tappan Zee Bridge. A driver could call the authority in advance and arrange for someone to drive their car over the bridge for them. The authority performed the service about six times a year.

The Maryland Transportation Authority previously offered a similar service for crossing the Chesapeake Bay Bridge, but that role is now filled by private companies.

The Mackinac Bridge Authority, which oversees the Mackinac Bridge connecting Michigan's Upper and Lower peninsulas, will drive gephyrophobics' cars across the bridge for a nominal fee. Some thousands drivers take advantage of this program annually.

Leslie Ann Pluhar had her Yugo blown off the bridge in 1989. Later investigation concluded she had stopped her car over the open steel grating on the bridge's span and that a gust of wind blowing through the grating pushed her vehicle off the bridge, but this assertion is not supported by recorded wind speed measurements taken on and around the bridge at the time of the accident.

== In media ==
Gephyrophobia is the main plot in the episode "The Bridge" of The Middle. The character Brick is plagued by the phobia.

In the 1991 British Channel 4 drama G.B.H., main character Jim Nelson (played by Michael Palin) suffers from gephyrophobia.

In 1965's A Charlie Brown Christmas, Lucy references gephyrophobia (albeit with a slight mispronunciation) when attempting to diagnose Charlie Brown's problems at her psychiatric help stand.

In the book series Diary of a Wimpy Kid, Frank Heffley is shown to have gephyrophobia in The Long Haul, most notably on page 154 (when he gets dizzy because he and his family get stuck in traffic while driving on a bridge).

== See also ==
- Tacoma Narrows Bridge, also known as Galloping Gertie
- List of bridge disasters
- List of structural failures and collapses
- List of phobias
