= Zilwaukee Township, Michigan =

- Civil township
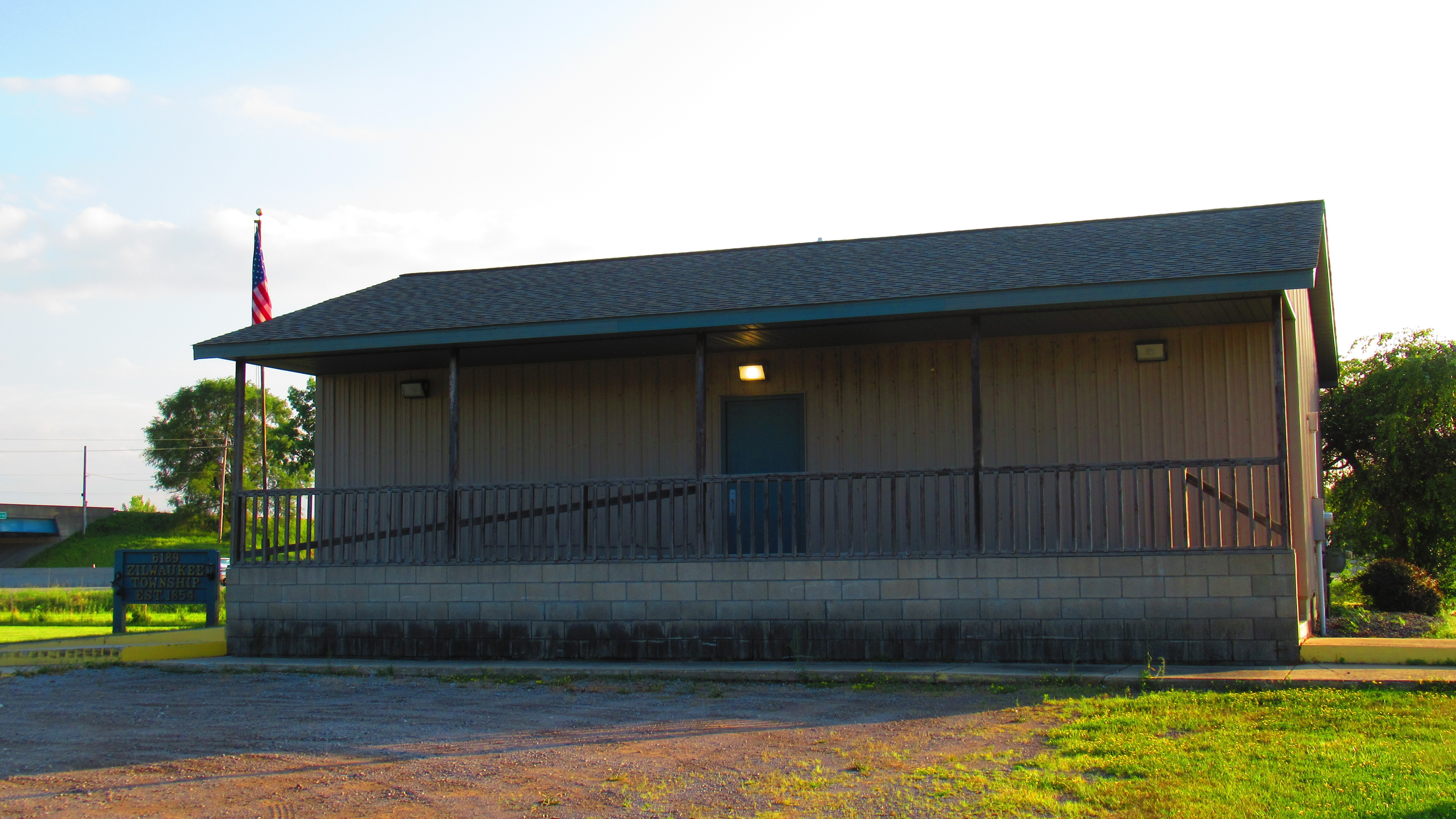
- Zilwaukee Township Hall

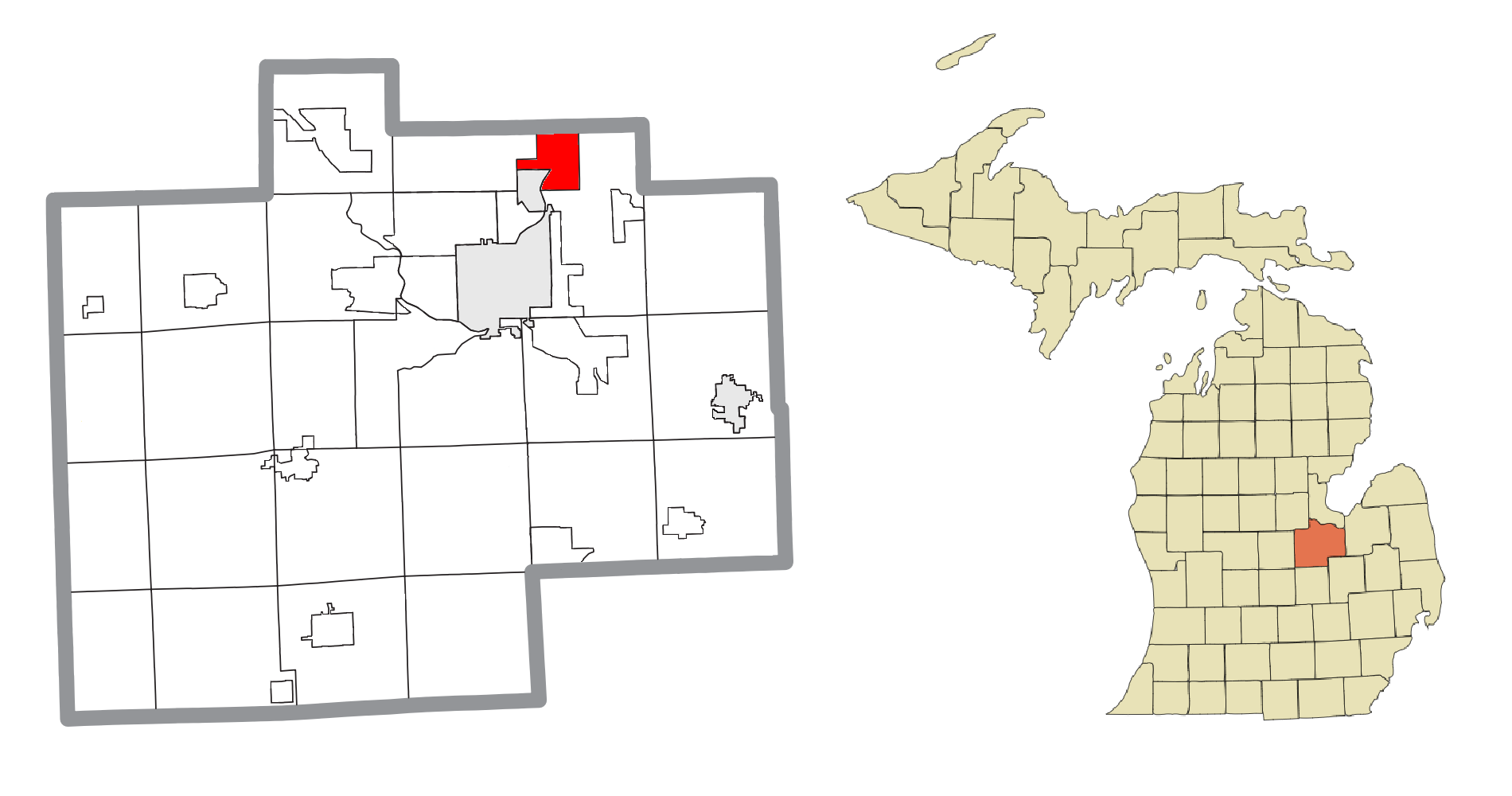
- Location within Saginaw County

- Location within the state of Michigan Location within the United States
- Coordinates: 43°30′12″N 83°53′48″W
- Country: United States
- State: Michigan
- County: Saginaw
- Established: 1854

Government
  - Supervisor: Scott Clark
  - Clerk: Patricia Brandt

Area
  - Total: 5.98 sq mi (15.50 km^{2})
  - Land: 3.58 sq mi (9.27 km^{2})
  - Water: 2.41 sq mi (6.23 km^{2})
- Elevation: 577 ft (176 m)

Population (2020)
  - Total: 62
  - Density: 17.3/sq mi (6.7/km^{2})
- Time zone: UTC-5 (Eastern (EST))
  - Summer (DST): UTC-4 (EDT)
- ZIP code(s): 48604 (Saginaw)
- Area code: 989
- FIPS code: 26-89340
- GNIS feature ID: 1627305

Zilwaukee Township is a civil township of Saginaw County in the U.S. state of Michigan. The population was 62 at the 2020 census, which ranks the township the fourth-least populated municipality in the state of Michigan after Pointe Aux Barques Township, Grand Island Township, and West Branch Township.

The city of Zilwaukee is southwest of the township, but the two are administered separately. The township is home to the Crow Island State Game Area, which covers a large portion of the township's area.

== History ==
Zilwaukee Township was organized on January 20, 1854 and included territory comprising Kochville Township and the northern third of present day Buena Vista Township. In 1864, the Oneida Salt & Lumber Co. built a mill on the Crow Reserve, territory in the township which had been deeded to Ojibwe Chief Kawkawisou in 1819. This land would eventually become the nucleus for the Crow Island State Game Area.

Zilwaukee Township first lost territory when Kochville Township was organized in 1856, losing most of its territory west of the Saginaw River. In 1881 the township again lost territory when Sections in its northern end west of the river were transferred to neighboring Bay County. In 1891, territory east of present-day North Towerline Road was detached and then attached to neighboring Buena Vista Township losing most of its territory east of the river. In 1964, the village of Zilwaukee in the southwestern part of the township incorporated as a city, reducing the township to its present boundaries.

== Geography ==
According to the U.S. Census Bureau, the township has a total area of 5.98 square miles (15.49 km^{2}), of which 3.58 square miles (9.27 km^{2}) is land and 2.40 square miles (6.22 km^{2}) (40.1%) is water.

The Saginaw River flows through the center of the township.

== Highways ==
- I-75 / US 23 crosses briefly within two sections of the township. The highway travels through the southwestern portion of the township, and the Zilwaukee Bridge begins within the township and crosses the Saginaw River to the city of Zilwaukee. The highway also passes through the westernmost portion of the township.
- I-675 has a portion of its northern terminus within the township at Interstate 75 / U.S. Route 23.
- M-13 runs north–west through the township along the Saginaw River.

== Demographics ==
As of the census of 2000, there were 61 people, 23 households, and 18 families residing in the township. The population density was 10.6 inhabitants per square mile (4.1/km^{2}). There were 26 housing units at an average density of 4.5 per square mile (1.7/km^{2}). The racial makeup of the township was 90.16% White, and 9.84% African American.

There were 23 households, out of which 26.1% had children under the age of 18 living with them, 73.9% were married couples living together, and 21.7% were non-families. 17.4% of all households were made up of individuals, and none had someone living alone who was 65 years of age or older. The average household size was 2.65 and the average family size was 3.06.

In the township the population was spread out, with 24.6% under the age of 18, 8.2% from 18 to 24, 16.4% from 25 to 44, 34.4% from 45 to 64, and 16.4% who were 65 years of age or older. The median age was 45 years. For every 100 females, there were 144.0 males. For every 100 females age 18 and over, there were 130.0 males.

The median income for a household in the township was $50,625, and the median income for a family was $52,188. Males had a median income of $50,938 versus $23,750 for females. The per capita income for the township was $21,268. None of the population and none of the families were below the poverty line.
