= Mackinac Bridge Authority =

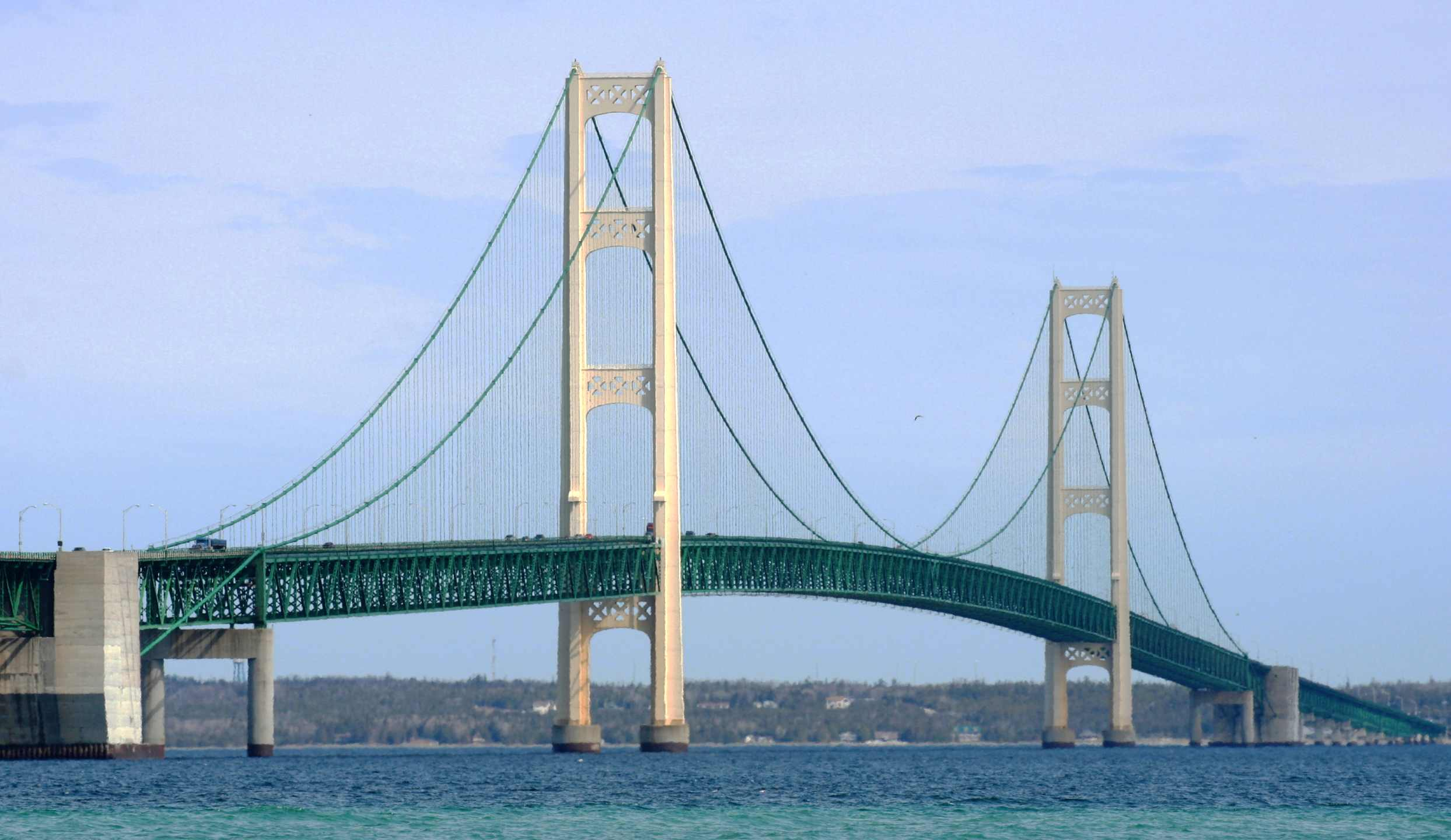
- The Mackinac Bridge in 2007

Authority overview
- Formed: 1950
- Type: Type One independent agency
- Jurisdiction: Mackinac Bridge
- Headquarters: N415 Interstate 75, St. Ignace, Michigan 49781; 45.8481°N 84.7232°W
- Authority executives: Chairman, Patrick F. Gleason; Executive Secretary, Kim Nowack
- Parent Authority: Michigan Department of Transportation (nominal)
- Key document: Mackinac Bridge Authority Act
- Website: mackinacbridge.org

The Mackinac Bridge Authority is an independent state agency of the U.S. state of Michigan that operates the Mackinac Bridge across the Straits of Mackinac. The Mackinac Bridge Authority has been directed by the state of Michigan to maintain the Mackinac Bridge as a self-supporting facility. The Mackinac Bridge is a toll bridge, with the tolls set at a level determined by the authority and its governing board.

== History ==
The Mackinac Bridge Authority was created in 1950 to study the feasibility of constructing a suspension bridge to connect Michigan's Lower Peninsula with its Upper Peninsula. The MBA was empowered by legislation in 1952 "to issue revenue bonds 'for the purpose of paying for the cost of a bridge'". The authority managed the bridge's construction from 1954 until 1957, and has overseen the operation of the bridge since its opening on November 1, 1957. The authority was originally scheduled for dissolution in 1986 after the last of the bonds were to be paid in full.

Over the course of 2004 and 2005, the Michigan Department of Transportation (MDOT) Director Gloria Jeff made moves to challenge the independence of the authority against previous practices claiming that the authority is not an independent agency. In 2004, Jeff moved $25 million from the authority to the Michigan Treasury construing that the Michigan State Treasurer is the authority's treasurer. On August 12, 2005, Jeff asserted engineering inspections and insurance would be handled by MDOT instead of the MBA based on a 40-year-old Attorney General's opinion; Jeff would not release the opinion.

In September 2005, Governor Jennifer Granholm was in talks between MDOT and the MBA to develop an agreement between the two agencies to solve the recent issues brought to the fore as the MDOT Director attempt to cut cost, due to statewide budget pressures, at the authority by reducing the board's power. The talks ended with an agreement for the bridge authority to resume operations as it has in the past with MDOT implementing its decisions and the MDOT Chief Deputy Director Kirk Steudle assigned the director's position on the authority board.

== Board ==
Six members of the governing board of the Mackinac Bridge Authority are appointed by the Governor of Michigan; the Transportation Department Director is an ex officio member. The MBA is an independent state agency responsible for the Mackinac Bridge and thus maintains that section of the overall State Trunkline Highway System. The MBA works with the Michigan Department of Transportation but does not report to it. The executive secretary of the MBA is appointed by MDOT with MBA approval, and the MDOT director serves on the board. Patrick F. Gleason has been the chairman of the board since 2018, and the executive secretary has been Kim Nowack since 2019.
