= 2009 Flint mayoral special election =

← 2007	May 5, 2009 (first round); August 4, 2009 (Runoff)	2011 →
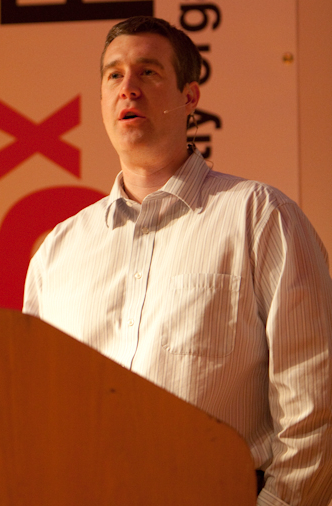

Candidate	Dayne Walling	Brenda Clack
First round	5,638; 45.43%	1,981; 15.96%
Runoff	12,266; 63.89%	6,876; 35.81%
Candidate	Darryl E. Buchanan	Gregory Eason
First round	1,966; 15.84%	1,434; 11.55%
Runoff	Eliminated	Eliminated
Mayor before election
Michael Brown (acting)
Nonpartisan
Elected mayor
Dayne Walling
Nonpartisan

The 2009 Flint mayoral special election took place on August 4, 2009, following a primary election on May 5, 2009. Mayor Don Williamson, facing a recall election on February 24, 2009, resigned on February 15, 2009, citing health reasons. Following Williamson's resignation, City Administrator Michael Brown served as acting Mayor until the special election could be held. Brown declined to run in the special election.

A crowded field emerged to run in the special election, and Dayne Walling, a businessman and a mayoral candidate who lost to Williamson in 2007, placed first, winning 45 percent of the vote. Genesee County Commissioner and former State Representative Brenda Clack narrowly defeated former City Administrator Darryl Buchanan for the right to face Walling in the general election, beating out Buchanan by just 15 votes. Ultimately, in the August 4 general election, Walling defeated Clack in a landslide, winning 64 percent of the vote.

== Primary election ==
=== Candidates ===
- Dayne Walling, businessman, 2007 candidate for Mayor
- Brenda Clack, Genesee County Commissioner, former State Representative
- Darryl E. Buchanan, former City Administrator
- Gregory Eason, former President of Jobs Central, Inc.
- Sheldon Neeley, City Councilman
- Eric Mays, community activist

=== Results ===
2009 Flint mayoral primary election
Party	Candidate	Votes	%
Nonpartisan	Dayne Walling	5,638	45.43%
Nonpartisan	Brenda Clack	1,981	15.96%
Nonpartisan	Darryl E. Buchanan	1,966	15.84%
Nonpartisan	Gregory Eason	1,434	11.55%
Nonpartisan	Sheldon Neeley	913	7.36%
Nonpartisan	Eric Mays	453	3.65%
Write-in		26	0.21%
Total votes		12,411	100.00%

== General election ==
=== Results ===
2009 Flint mayoral general election
Party	Candidate	Votes	%
Nonpartisan	Dayne Walling	12,266	63.89%
Nonpartisan	Brenda Clack	6,876	35.81%
Write-in		58	0.30%
Total votes		19,200	100.00%
