= 2026 Flint mayoral election =

- August 4, 2026 (first round); November 3, 2026 (runoff)

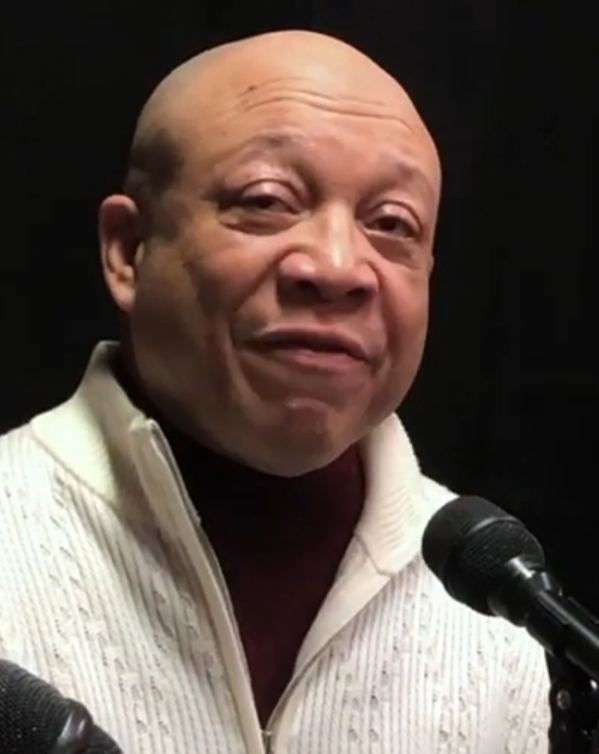
Candidate	Tonya Burns	Sheldon Neeley
Party	Nonpartisan	Nonpartisan
First round	3,915; 32.75%	5,133; 42.93%
Runoff	12,810; 54.42%	10,438; 44.35
Mayor before election
Sheldon Neeley
Nonpartisan
Elected mayor
Tonya Burns
Nonpartisan

The 2026 Flint mayoral election took place on November 3, 2026 to elect the next mayor of Flint, Michigan. The primary election was held on August 4, 2026. Incumbent mayor Sheldon Neeley, who was first elected in 2019 and re-elected in 2022, sought seek re-election. City councilor Tonya Burns defeated Neeley in the general election.

== Candidates ==
=== Advanced to general election ===
- Tonya Burns, city councilor from the 6th ward
- Sheldon Neeley, incumbent mayor (2019–present)

=== Eliminated in primary ===
- Micaiah Owens, attorney
- Roshonda Womack, entrepreneur
- Linda Anthony, pastor and bus driver (write-in candidate)

=== Declined ===
- Delrico Loyd, chair of the Genesee County Board of Commissioners

== Results ==
=== Primary election ===
2026 Flint mayoral primary election
Party	Candidate	Votes	%
Independent	Sheldon Neeley (incumbent)	5,133	42.93%
Independent	Tonya Burns	3,915	32.75%
Independent	Roshanda Womack	1,709	14.29%
Independent	Micaiah J. Owens	1,195	9.99%
Write-In	Linda Anthony	4	0.03%
Total votes		11,956	100.0

=== General election ===
2026 Flint mayoral general election
Party	Candidate	Votes	%
Independent	Tonya Burns	12,810	54.42
Independent	Sheldon Neeley (incumbent)	10,438	44.35
Write-in		289	1.23
Total votes		23,537	100.0
