= 2015 Flint mayoral election =

← 2011	August 4, 2015 (first round); November 5, 2015 (Runoff)	2017 (recall) →
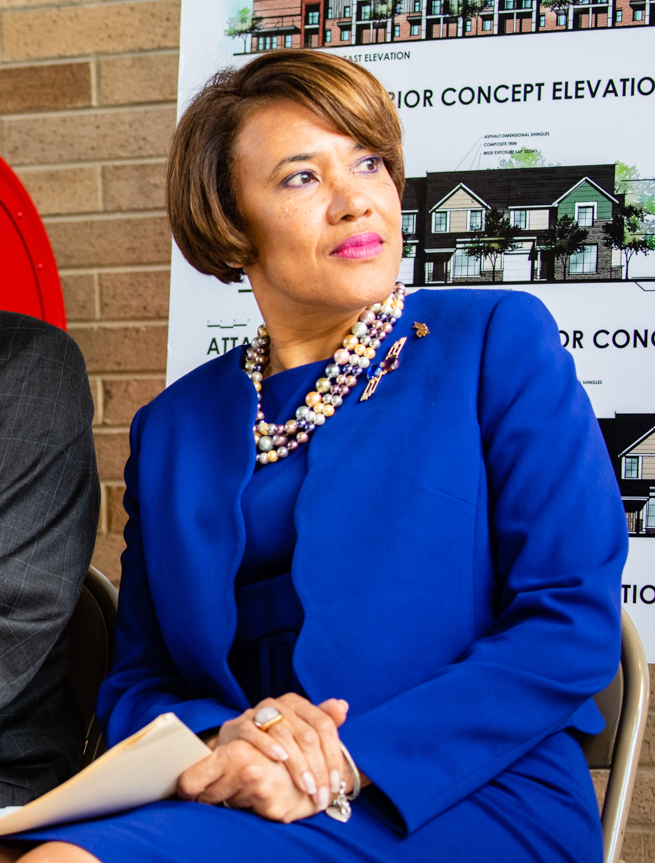

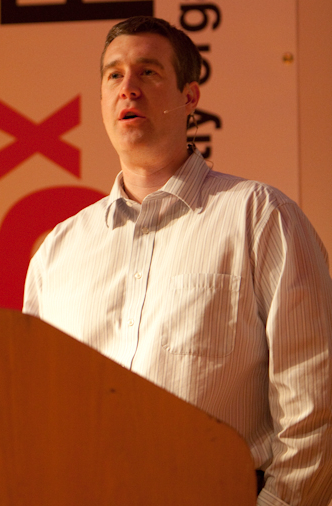

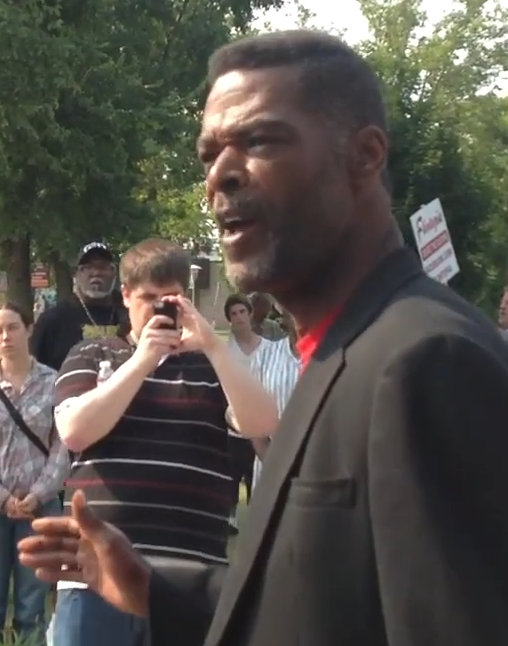

Candidate	Karen Weaver	Dayne Walling
First round	2,364; 29.66%	3,530; 44.29%
Runoff	7,825; 55.96%	6,061; 43.35%
Candidate	Eric Mays	Wantwaz Diaz
First round	1,194; 14.98%	763; 9.57%
Runoff	Eliminated	Eliminated
Mayor before election
Dayne Walling
Nonpartisan
Elected mayor
Karen Weaver
Nonpartisan

The 2015 Flint mayoral election took place on November 5, 2015, following the primary election that took place on August 4, 2015. Incumbent Mayor Dayne Walling ran for re-election to a third term. He was challenged by two members of the City Council, Eric Mays and Wantwaz Diaz, as well as businesswoman Karen Weaver. Walling placed first in the primary, winning 44 percent of the vote. Weaver won 30 percent of the vote, beating out Mays, who won 15 percent, and Diaz, who won 10 percent. In the general election, Weaver ultimately defeated Walling by a wide margin, leading him 56–43 percent, a reversal of Walling's margin of victory in 2011.

== Primary election ==
=== Candidates ===
- Dayne Walling, incumbent Mayor
- Karen Weaver, businesswoman
- Eric Mays, City Councilman
- Wantwaz Diaz, City Councilman

=== Results ===
2015 Flint mayoral primary election
Party	Candidate	Votes	%
Nonpartisan	Dayne Walling (inc.)	3,530	44.29%
Nonpartisan	Karen Weaver	2,364	29.66%
Nonpartisan	Eric Mays	1,194	14.98%
Nonpartisan	Wantwaz Diaz	763	9.57%
Write-in		120	1.51%
Total votes		7,971	100.00%

== General election ==
=== Results ===
2015 Flint mayoral general election
Party	Candidate	Votes	%
Nonpartisan	Karen Weaver	7,825	55.96%
Nonpartisan	Dayne Walling (inc.)	6,061	43.35%
Write-in		96	0.69%
Total votes		13,982	100.00%
