= 2007 Flint mayoral election =

← 2003	August 7, 2007 (first round); November 6, 2007 (runoff)	2009 (special) →

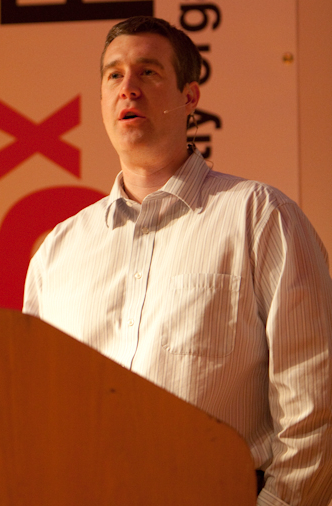

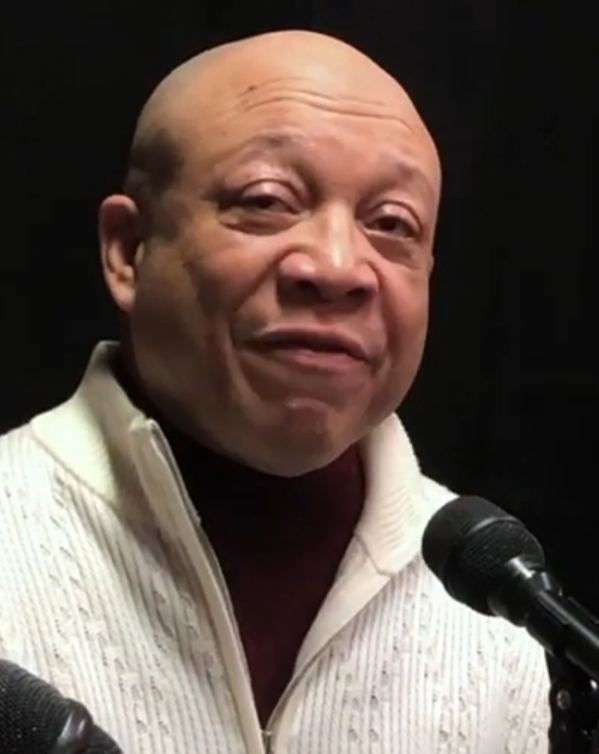

Candidate	Don Williamson	Dayne Walling
Party	Nonpartisan	Nonpartisan
First round	4,735; 32.81%	3,301; 22.87%
Runoff	12,434; 51.08%	11,853; 48.69%
Candidate	Sheldon Neeley	Norm Bryant
First round	2,334; 16.17%	1,886; 13.07%
Runoff	Eliminated	Eliminated
Mayor before election
Don Williamson
Nonpartisan
Elected mayor
Don Williamson
Nonpartisan

The 2007 Flint mayoral election was held on November 6, 2007, with the primary election occurring on August 7, 2007. Incumbent Mayor Don Williamson ran for re-election. He faced a crowded field of opponents, and received less than one-third of the vote in the primary election, winning just 33 percent of the vote. Community activist and businessman Dayne Walling placed second over City Councilman Sheldon Neeley, winning 23 percent of the vote, advancing to the general election against Williamson. Williamson narrowly defeated Walling, 51–49 percent, to win a second term. However, fewer than two years into Williamson's term, he would face a recall election, which he resigned to avoid, which ultimately led to Walling's election in a 2009 special election.

== Primary election ==
=== Candidates ===
- Don Williamson, incumbent Mayor
- Dayne Walling, President of the Flint Club, research fellow at the Genesee County Land Bank
- Sheldon Neeley, City Councilman
- Norm Bryant, barbershop owner, former member of the Flint Board of Education
- Dale Weighill, CEO of the Resource Center
- Tamra Edwards, nonprofit executive, former Durham, North Carolina City Councilwoman
- David Davenport, truck driver

=== Results ===
2003 Flint mayoral primary election results
Party	Candidate	Votes	%
Nonpartisan	Don Williamson (inc.)	4,735	32.81%
Nonpartisan	Dayne Walling	3,301	22.87%
Nonpartisan	Sheldon Neeley	2,334	16.17%
Nonpartisan	Norm Bryant	1,886	13.07%
Nonpartisan	Dale Weighill	1,616	11.20%
Nonpartisan	Tamra Edwards	476	3.30%
Nonpartisan	David Davenport	85	0.59%
Total votes		14,433	100.00%

== General election ==
=== Results ===
2003 Flint mayoral general election results
Party	Candidate	Votes	%
Nonpartisan	Don Williamson (inc.)	12,434	51.08%
Nonpartisan	Dayne Walling	11,853	48.69%
Write-in		57	0.23%
Total votes		24,344	100.00%
