= 2022 Flint mayoral election =

- August 8, 2022 (first round); November 8, 2022 (runoff)
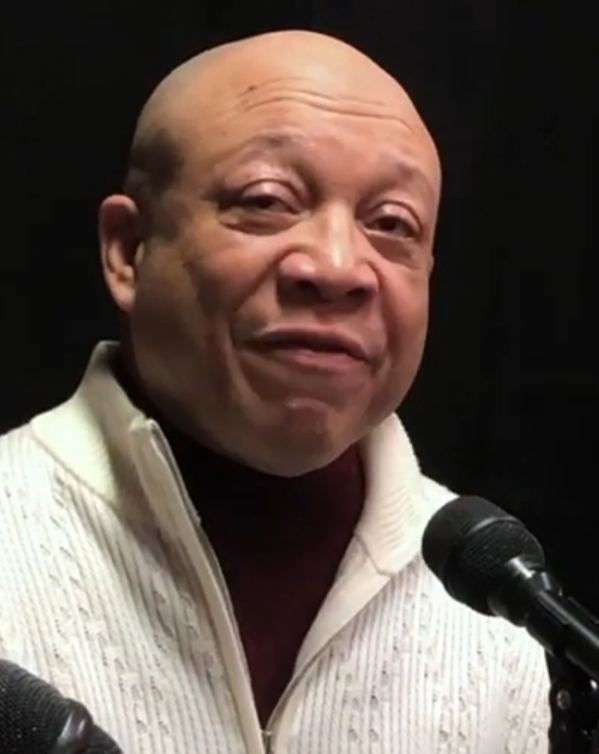

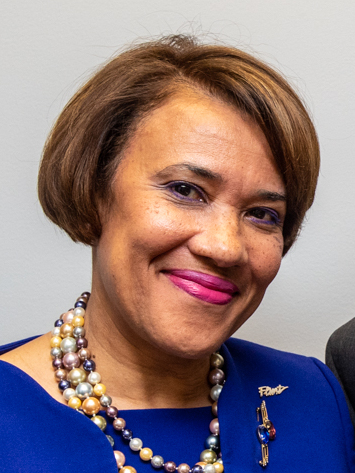

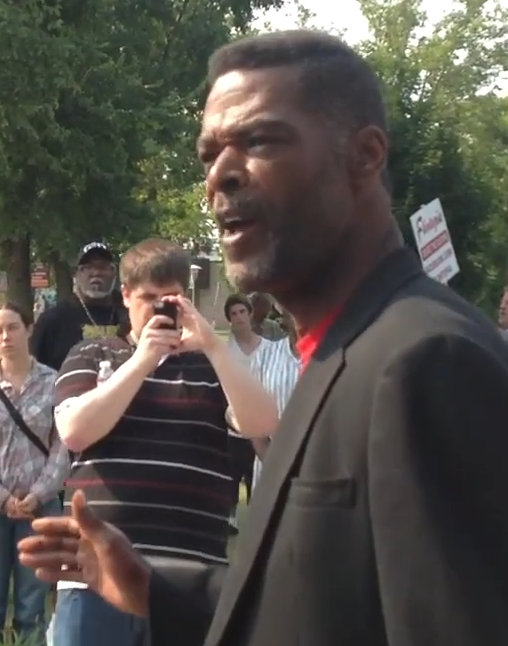
Candidate	Sheldon Neeley	Karen Weaver	Eric Mays
Party	Nonpartisan	Nonpartisan	Nonpartisan
First round	4,945; 48.82%	4,062; 40.10%	1,123; 11.09%
Runoff	11,692; 52.88%	10,411; 47.08%	Eliminated
Mayor before election
Sheldon Neeley
Nonpartisan
Elected mayor
Sheldon Neeley
Nonpartisan

The 2022 Flint mayoral election was held on November 8, 2022, to elect the Mayor of the City of Flint. Incumbent Mayor Sheldon Neeley, who was first elected in 2019, ran for re-election to a second term. He was challenged by former Mayor Karen Weaver and City Councilmember Eric Mays. Neeley and Weaver placed first and second in the August 2, 2022, primary election, and advanced to the general election, where Neeley narrowly defeated Weaver to win re-election.

== Background ==
Incumbent Sheldon Neeley announced in February 2022 his intention to seek reelection as mayor. Neeley had been serving as the Mayor of Flint since 2019 after defeating the incumbent, Karen Weaver. Major issues in the campaign included the funding of American Rescue Plan Act projects, crime, blight, and controversies in the City Council and the Neeley Administration.

== Primary election ==
=== Candidates ===
- Sheldon Neeley, incumbent Mayor of Flint
- Karen Weaver, former Mayor of Flint
- Eric Mays, Flint City Council President

=== Results ===
2022 Flint mayoral primary election results
Party	Candidate	Votes	%
Nonpartisan	Sheldon Neeley (inc.)	4,945	48.82%
Nonpartisan	Karen Weaver	4,062	40.10%
Nonpartisan	Eric Mays	1,123	11.09%
Total votes		10,130	100.00%

== General election ==
=== Results ===
2022 Flint mayoral general election results
Party	Candidate	Votes	%
Nonpartisan	Sheldon Neeley (inc.)	11,692	52.88%
Nonpartisan	Karen Weaver	10,411	47.08%
Write-in		9	0.04%
Total votes		22,112	100.00%
