= 2019 Flint mayoral election =

- August 6, 2019 (first round); November 5, 2019 (runoff)
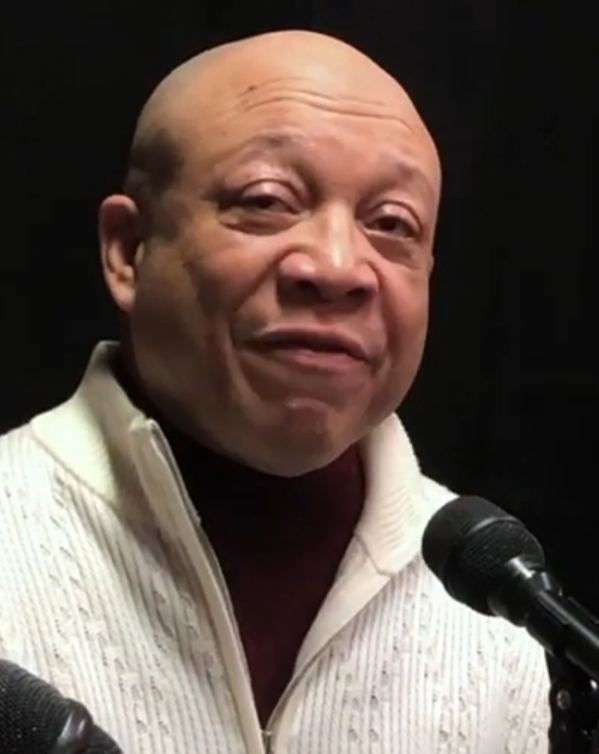

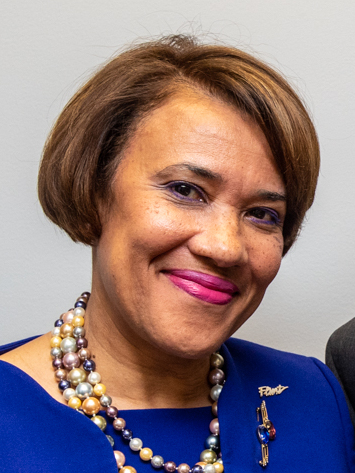

Candidate	Sheldon Neeley	Karen Weaver	Don Pfeiffer
Party	Nonpartisan	Nonpartisan	Nonpartisan
First round	3,585; 39.56%	3,815; 42.10%	1,198; 13.22%
Runoff	7,082; 50.41%	6,877; 48.95%
Mayor before election
Karen Weaver
Nonpartisan
Elected mayor
Sheldon Neeley
Nonpartisan

The 2019 Flint mayoral election was held on November 5, 2019, following a primary election on August 6, 2019. Incumbent Mayor Karen Weaver, who was first elected in 2015 and retained in a recall election in 2017, ran for re-election to a second term. She was challenged by State Representative Sheldon Neeley, contractor Don Pfeiffer, and former city administrator Gregory Eason. Weaver narrowly placed first in the primary election, winning 42 percent of the vote to Neeley's 40 percent, and they both advanced to the general election. Neeley ultimately defeated Weaver by just 205 votes, winning 50–49 percent.

== Primary election ==
=== Candidates ===
- Karen Weaver, incumbent Mayor
- Sheldon Neeley, State Representative
- Don Pfeiffer, contractor, 2017 candidate for Mayor
- Gregory A. Eason, former city administrator

=== Results ===
2019 Flint mayoral primary election results
Party	Candidate	Votes	%
Nonpartisan	Karen Weaver (inc.)	3,815	42.10%
Nonpartisan	Sheldon Neeley	3,585	39.56%
Nonpartisan	Don Pfeiffer	1,198	13.22%
Nonpartisan	Gregory A. Eason	452	4.99%
Write-in		12	0.13%
Total votes		9,062	100.00%

== General election ==
=== Results ===
2019 Flint mayoral general election results
Party	Candidate	Votes	%
Nonpartisan	Sheldon Neeley	7,082	50.41%
Nonpartisan	Karen Weaver (inc.)	6,877	48.95%
Write-in		91	0.65%
Total votes		14,050	100.00%
