= 2011 Flint mayoral election =

← 2009 (special)	August 2, 2011 (first round); November 8, 2011 (Runoff)	2015 →
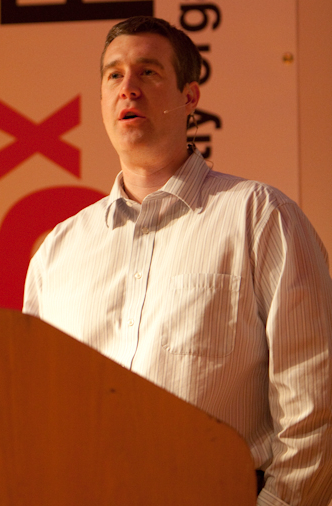

Candidate	Dayne Walling	Darryl E. Buchanan	Scott Smith
First round	5,513; 47.49%	2,788; 24.02%	2,459; 21.18%
Runoff	8,819; 55.90%	6,868; 43.53%	Eliminated
Mayor before election
Dayne Walling
Nonpartisan
Elected mayor
Dayne Walling
Nonpartisan

The 2011 Flint mayoral election took place on November 8, 2011, with a primary election taking place on August 2, 2011. Incumbent Mayor Dayne Walling, who was first elected in the 2009 special election, ran for re-election to a full term. He faced several opponents, and ultimately advanced to the general election against former City Administrator Darryl Buchanan, who unsuccessfully ran in the 2009 election. Walling led Buchanan, 47–24 percent, in the primary election, and defeated him by a wide margin in the general election, winning 56 percent of the vote.

== Primary election ==
=== Candidates ===
- Dayne Walling, incumbent Mayor
- Darryl E. Buchanan, former City Administrator, 2009 candidate for Mayor
- Scott Smith, businessman
- Eric Mays, community activist
- David Davenport, Flint School Board member
- Jung Ho Kim, businessman
- Don Pfeiffer, businessman

=== Results ===
2011 Flint mayoral primary election
Party	Candidate	Votes	%
Nonpartisan	Dayne Walling (inc.)	5,513	47.49%
Nonpartisan	Darryl E. Buchanan	2,788	24.02%
Nonpartisan	Scott Smith	2,459	21.18%
Nonpartisan	Eric Mays	325	2.80%
Nonpartisan	David Davenport	197	1.70%
Nonpartisan	Jung Ho Kim	165	1.42%
Nonpartisan	Don Pfeiffer	128	1.10%
Write-in		33	0.28%
Total votes		11,608	100.00%

== General election ==
=== Results ===
2011 Flint mayoral general election
Party	Candidate	Votes	%
Nonpartisan	Dayne Walling (inc.)	8,819	55.90%
Nonpartisan	Darryl E. Buchanan	6,868	43.53%
Write-in		89	0.56%
Total votes		15,776	100.00%
