= Eric Mays =

American politician (1958–2024)

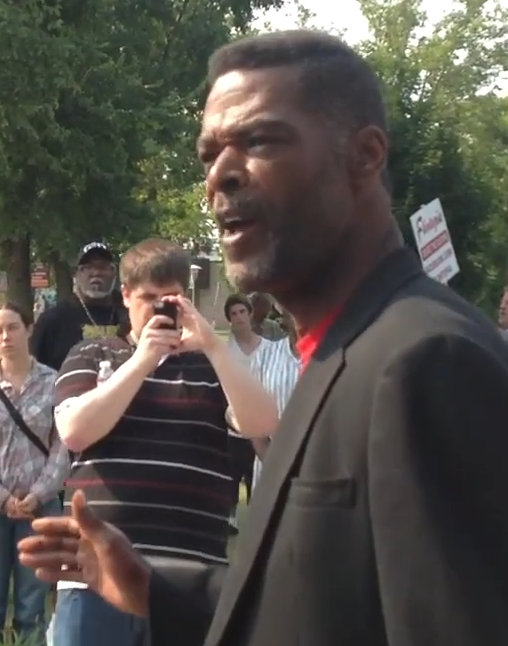
- Mays in 2014

Member of the Flint City Council from the 1st Ward
- In office November 11, 2013 – February 24, 2024
- Preceded by: Claudia Croom
- Succeeded by: Leon El-Alamin

Personal details
- Born: September 16, 1958 Flint, Michigan, U.S.
- Died: February 24, 2024 (aged 65) Flint, Michigan, U.S.
- Party: Democratic (from 1984)
- Other political affiliations: Republican (until 1984)
- Children: 1
- Education: Flint Northern High School
- Alma mater: Michigan State University

Eric Bradford Mays (September 16, 1958 – February 24, 2024) was an American auto worker, union organizer, and politician. Mays served as a member of the Flint City Council from November 2013 until his death in 2024, representing northwest Flint as the councilor from the city's first ward. He was one of the first elected officials to recognize the Flint water crisis, calling for investigations into the toxic water, despite opposition from other elected officials and government employees. Mays was also known to be controversial, due to several incidents where he was suspended and escorted out of city council meetings.

== Early life and education ==
Mays was born to Rosie B. Mays and the Reverend Louis H. Mays, pastor of the Shiloh Missionary Baptist Church of Flint. He was one of nine children.

Mays graduated from Flint Northern High School in 1976, and in 1981 received a bachelor's degree from Michigan State University in Political Science and Pre-Law.

== Career ==
Mays worked at General Motors, serving in several positions for local unions under the United Auto Workers Local 598, Regional Office, and Local 699.

In 1981, Mays began attending city council meetings as a political action representative for the NAACP.

Mays was convicted of felony assault in 1987 for brandishing a .357 magnum revolver at a man who he claimed had previously broken into his home, then later threatened his life. He pleaded guilty and was sentenced to a year of probation. He initially hoped to go to law school, but the charge of felonious assault prevented him.

Mays was active in Flint's North Side as a community activist. He worked on the successful campaign of Don Williamson in 2003 and the unsuccessful 2007 campaign of Dayne Walling, who narrowly lost to the incumbent Williamson.

Mays ran for office several times before ultimately winning in 2013. In 1982, Mays ran as a Republican against the 1st District County Commissioner John William Hunter. In 1984, Mays challenged 2nd District Commissioner Sylvester Broome in the Democratic primary. Mays ran against in the 1st District in 1986, as a Democrat. Mays ran in a special election in August 2008 in the 1st Ward, losing to Delrico Loyd by 43 votes. Mays ran in the primary for the 2009 Flint mayoral special election. That year, Mays also ran as a write-in in the 1st Ward city council election.

On July 2, 2012, Mays was taking part in a public hearing on proposed tax abatements for downtown Flint buildings. He was asked to return to his seat by an assistant city attorney for going over his allotted three minutes to speak. Mays refused, claiming he should be given more time due to a prior interruption while criticizing the time limit instituted by emergency manager (EM) Michael Brown. He was granted extra time. When this extra time was passed he continued to speak. He was again asked to return to his seat but continued to speak. A police officer approached him, asking him to sit down. Mays refused, was handcuffed, and then led out of the building. He was issued a ticket for disrupting a meeting of a public body, a misdemeanor, and released. Mays represented himself against the ticket in a jury trial and was found guilty on February 22, 2013. He was sentenced on March 13 to pay a fine and court costs amounting to $425.

== City council tenure ==
After three attempts, Mays was elected to the Flint City Council in November, 2013, winning 709–702 against his opponent, Anita Brown.

=== 2013 arrest ===
On November 30, 2013, Mays was arrested on Interstate 475 for driving under the influence, possession of marijuana, refusal to be fingerprinted, no proof of insurance and failing to report an accident. According to Special Prosecutor Michael Gildner, Mays crashed his car near Leith Street and Industrial Avenue in Flint. He then drove his car for approximately three miles. According to police and Gildner, he drove on the wrong side of the road on four flat tires. He was found by police while he was trying to change the tires at approximately 2:50 a.m. The vehicle, a Chevrolet Impala, "was leaking fluid, a front axle was snapped and a headlight was smashed out...Two tires were flat and two others shredded." No witnesses testified to seeing Mays driving the vehicle on the night of his arrest, but police witnesses said he confessed to driving drunk the night of his arrest. Mays also admitted to being legally intoxicated at the time of his arrest, which a blood alcohol reading confirmed.

In June 2014, the jury decided to acquit Mays of two charges, reduced the drunk driving charge to impaired driving, and reached a deadlock on the charge of failing to report an accident. The impaired driving charge was later overturned when a higher court found that the judge had failed to warn Mays about the risks of representing himself.

Mays requested a retrial after claiming that the judge in the first treated him unfairly, which was granted. In the November 2015 retrial, Mays again represented himself. During the selection of the jury in this trial, Mays asked the potential jurors whether they believed in God, which immediately brought an objection from Gildner. Mays followed this by saying he did believe in God. A mistrial was requested by Gildner on the basis that Gildner objecting to Mays' question could make him appear anti-God to a prospective jury. The assigned judge, East Lansing District Judge Richard D. Ball, declined; the judge did however speak with the seated jurors, telling them not to "penalize" Gildner on that basis.

Mays initially declined to allow the breathalyzer results to be admitted into evidence as he would be unable to question the officer who admitted the test about how the test was conducted; the officer was, at that time, undergoing emergency surgery. However, he eventually yielded and the case moved forward after the judge told him he could later ask for a previous transcript of the officer being questioned about the results. Mays was convicted in November 2015 and sentenced to 28 days in jail on January 5, 2016. Mays claimed that the case was politically motivated and that his political opponents were trying to send him to jail to stop him speaking out about the Flint water crisis. The judge disagreed, saying he found no evidence of a political conspiracy.

EM Darnell Earley was appointed in October 2013. Earley used Mays' arrest to demand his resignation. When Mays put forward a demurrer, Earley tried to take away Mays' powers by issuing an executive order on December 13, 2013, that prohibited him from speaking to city staff and that he could only speak with Earley by email and that if any residents from the First Ward wanted anything from the city, they would have to contact the then City Clerk Inez Brown.

The order also stated that Mays could not be disruptive during city council meetings, and that he could only address the council when recognised by then-ninth ward councilman and President of the City Council Scott Kincaid.

=== Flint water crisis, 2015 committee removal and mayoral bid ===
Mays was an activist for the quality of Flint's water, being one of the first elected officials to question its quality during the Flint water crisis. He was initially the sole elected voice regarding the issue, and faced widespread opposition by other officials that refused to investigate Flint's water and falsely claimed there were no issues.

Edward Kurtz, Earley's predecessor, approved the switch from the Detroit Water and Sewerage Department (DWSD) to a new Karegnondi Water Authority (KWA), which was still under construction at the time, in April 2013. He also signed a resolution in June of that year committing Flint to receiving its water supply from the Flint River. On April 25, 2014, Earley swapped Flint's water supply from the DWSD to the Flint River. Residents began to complain about the color, taste and smell of the water. By September of that year, Flint had issued several advisories to boil water. Already upset about the price of the water, Mays began questioning city staff about its quality. He was falsely told that the issues were due to the age of the water systems, to which he wondered why similar problems weren't reported when the DWSD supplied the water. That month, Mays made a Facebook post stating that the city council should host investigative hearings. Both city and state officials falsely claimed the water was safe and that a hearing was not necessary.

Earley resigned as EM in January 2015 and was replaced by Jerry Ambrose. Mays later said of Earley that he was a "gruff, nasty, arrogant, non-listening kind of guy." That month, Mays invited the then director of the DWSD, Sue McCormick, to speak to the Flint city council about switching the water supply back to DWSD; the council failed to put the issue on the agenda, forcing McCormick to speak during the public portion of the meeting. Two months later the council voted 7–1 to purchase 16 million gallons of water a day from the KWA while still using Lake Huron. The only no vote was Councilman Bryant Nolden, who wished for the water to be supplied from the Flint River. This decision was later reverted by Ambrose due to the cost associated with switching back.

On July 8, 2015, Mays was removed from a three-person finance committee meeting by police. The committee, of which Mays was not a member, had been discussing grass cutting in the city. When Mays was allowed to comment on the issue, he complained that city workers hadn't cut the grass in his ward while doing so for members including Jackie Poplar, who had supported then-Mayor Dayne Walling's re-election. Mays stated he didn't understand why the city was able to spend $22,000 to prosecute him but didn't have the money to keep the grass and weeds cut on public rights of way and private properties.

He became increasingly irate despite attempts to bring order, leading to Councilwoman Monica Galloway reading him the city's disorderly conduct ordinance, stating he could be arrested if he failed to come to order. After continued disruption, Galloway requested that police remove Mays. Mays was initially removed from the meeting without an arrest being made, however officials later sought a charge of disorderly conduct after reviewing footage of the incident. On July 13 an arrest warrant was issued for Mays. After a three-day trial, Mays was found guilty on February 1, 2016.

Mays ran for mayor in 2015 and was initially unopposed due to a clerical error which meant he was the only one to submit his petitions in time for the April 21 cut-off, however he fell 48 signatures short of the 900 valid signatures required after the invalidation of 176 signatures for various reasons.

In an email sent by Beth Clement, then-Governor Rick Snyder's deputy chief of staff, on April 30, Clement said "Eric Mays, the Flint city councilman who...has been very problematic to both our EM [sic] and secure cities efforts, is the only candidate who filed by the April 21st deadline." Then-Lieutenant Governor Brian Calley replied by saying "Too much progress has been made in Flint to let it go to this guy". Snyder suggested that the issue should be passed to then-Flint Democrat Senate minority leader Jim Ananich. 12 days later Ananich proposed a bill that would extend the filing deadline. The mayoral primaries were hosted on August 4 that year.

Mays lost in the primaries, with Karen Weaver later beating the incumbent Dayne Walling in the elections to become the first female Mayor of Flint.

=== Laptop pawning ===
On May 23, 2017, Mays admitted to pawning a laptop issued to him by the city to "Music Man Pawnshop" for $100. Kincaid filed a criminal complaint against Mays on May 25 that year due to the "misuse of taxpayer-funded equipment." Mays later said "Kincaid is out here making political allegations, but I pray and hope that there are no criminal charges", and that Mays believed the laptop was safer at the pawn shop, saying "City Hall has had break-ins." Kincaid and Mays were "often at odds."

The investigation took several months and on August 26, 2017, Mays plead no contest to "wilful neglect of duty", with police alleging that he had pawned the laptop nine times over the preceding two years, beginning on January 15, 2015, each time later reclaiming it. On May 23, 2017, Mays stated "I don't think it's criminal, I think it just shows I'm poor," and that the laptop was safer in the pawn shop due to city hall having had instances of trespassing in the past.

The sentencing was delayed until after the November 7 city council election, in which Mays was again running against Anita Brown. He was sentenced on November 27, 2017, where he was ordered to pay $300 and attend a sheriff's work detail for a week.

=== 2019–2021 ===
In January 2019, Mays was removed as finance chair.

On January 21, 2020, Mays and City Council President Monica Galloway had been arguing at various points throughout a city council meeting. Approximately three and a half hours through the meeting, Galloway attempted to end a portion of the meeting when Mays talked over her, asking "President Galloway, point of information: Did you have to be rude to me?" She replied that she wasn't trying to, after which Mays said "Well then you shouldn't have, I was wrapping it up. You ain’t got to be like Hitler. You sound like it from where I sat, like Hitler, what you want me to do." He then gave a Nazi salute.

On January 27, Councilman Maurice Davis motioned to have Mays removed from his leadership roles as Vice President of the city council and finance chair. Shortly after Mays was removed by police due to surpassing his warnings for being out of order - resulting in him yelling in protest while being escorted out - the vote was called and returned a unanimous verdict to remove him of his roles at 6–0.

In March 2020, Mays was censured for 30 days for being disruptive. On September 27, 2021, Mays was removed from a virtual meeting with fellow council members by the then-President Kate Fields without a chance for appeal, which resulted in Fields' censure and silencing the following day.

On November 25, 2021, Mays became President of the Flint City Council after receiving five votes including himself and four other council members. Mays said of this in the proceeding meeting "I look forward to getting everybody ready for the positions that they hold. And I'm telling you, I’ve been on this council for at least eight years. I ain’t tripping on a position. Just to have it and give to y’all has been a blessing."

=== 2022 arrest and mayoral bid ===
In March 2022, Mays was censured for 30 days due to a "lack of decorum during a meeting...berating City Clerk Inez Brown, City Administrator Clyde Edwards, and other members of the council." Mays filed a lawsuit to block the suspension which led to a temporary injunction, but the judge in the case dissolved the injunction, leaving Mays under suspension.

On April 25, 2022, during a council meeting, Mays was warned for using profanity. He requested to leave the meeting, saying "May I ask to be excused so you don't get the pleasure of throwing me out? May I be excused?" This was granted by the chair of the meeting, however after approximately 8–12 minutes Mays returned and was asked to leave the meeting. This is due to council rule 27.1 which states:

"No councilpersons shall leave a meeting of the council without first having obtained leave to do so from the president, presiding officer or committee chair...If a councilperson leaves a meeting without having obtained this permission, the presiding officer is to assume the councilperson has left the meeting and will not, cannot, return without the presiding officer’s permission. A councilperson who has left a meeting may not vote without having first obtained the presiding officer’s permission to return to the meeting."

Mays appealed the ruling which, after deliberation, returned a 7–1 vote for Mays to leave, with Mays as the sole no vote. He refused to leave, after which he was arrested and removed by police, with the arresting officer testifying during the March 2023 trial that Mays stated to him that he would not leave unless he was handcuffed and arrested. Following his arrest and removal, a vote took place to remove him as President of the City Council, which returned with a unanimous 6–0 to remove him.

During Mays' trial, all of the city council members who testified stated that, when they had previously requested to leave for various reasons, all of them returned to their seats without issue. After the two-day trial, Mays was found guilty of disorderly conduct on March 10. On April 23, 2023, Mays was sentenced to six months of probation and a fine of $125. Mays filed for appeal in the case on May 12.

Due to the guilty verdict, a recall proposal was filed by a resident of the first ward on June 21, 2023.

Mays attempted to run for mayor in 2022, losing to the incumbent Sheldon Neeley.

=== 2023 ===
On July 10, 2023, during a council meeting Mays "shouted profanities at the chair and other councilmembers [and] failed to conduct himself with appropriate decorum." The city council voted on July 31 to suspend Mays, returning a 5–2 vote in support of a suspension. He was suspended until September 1.

On August 1, Mays' attorneys sued the city council, asking that Judge B. Chris Christenson prevent the council from enforcing the suspension and to find the council in violation of the Open Meetings Act (OMA). The lawsuit claimed that the council were in violation of the OMA by not allowing Mays to "address a meeting of a public in his official capacity".

On December 20, 2023, Mays was escorted from a council meeting by three police officers after making "constant frivolous motions" and using "racist rhetoric.” He was suspended for 90 days after his removal. Mays denied the allegations and his attorneys filed for a temporary restraining order regarding the suspension in federal court. The federal judge turned down his request, leaving the suspension in place.

== Death ==
Mays died of natural causes at his home in Flint late on February 24, 2024. He was 65. Following his death, the City of Flint released a statement that praised Mays' "bold and courageous service" and "beloved among his constituents in the First Ward." The flag above the city hall was lowered to half-mast beginning February 26. Then-Mayor Sheldon Neeley called his death "a tremendous loss for our community and a shock to all friends and family".

Congressman Dan Kildee, one of Mays' classmates at Flint Northern High School, expressed his condolences to Mays' family and stated that “Councilman Mays loved serving Flint on the City Council, and his constituents continuously re-elected him because of his bold and unwavering voice. Our lifelong friendship always sustained through the politics of the day."

Kevin Mays, Eric Mays' nephew, among a few mourners near Eric's home, said "We appreciate the love from the city. We know what the city meant to him, so you can only imagine what he meant to us. Everything he stood for leaves a legacy for our family, leaves great steps for us to follow in. However you felt about him, what he fought for was the people and how he felt about this community. He stood on that. He stood behind it. And we can't do anything but continue that fight."

Mays died without a will, leading to a lawsuit being filed by Eric HaKeem Deontaye Mays, Eric Mays' only son, on 8 March, 2024, against the Lawrence E. Moon Funeral Home, three of Eric's son's uncles and an aunt. This battle delayed his funeral, which was supposed to take place on March 9. Due to this, the city suggested that a minute's silence take place on that day from noon.

Eric Mays' body was released to his son on March 11, 2024, after the Lawrence E. Moon Funeral Home surrendered their rights to the body to him. The body was transferred to the Paradise Funeral Chapel in Saginaw, Michigan. The suit was dismissed the same day. On 8 March that year, Eric HaKeem Deontaye Mays sued the City of Flint, alleging that it had withheld a copy of Eric Mays' $75,000 life insurance policy, claiming that it had listed him as a beneficiary and that it was active at the time of his death; this suit was also dismissed on May 9.

== Electoral history ==
2013 Flint City Council First Ward election
Primary election
Party	Candidate	Votes	%
Nonpartisan	Anita Brown	417	41.58
Nonpartisan	Eric Mays	362	36.09
Nonpartisan	Claudia Croom (incumbent)	167	16.65
Nonpartisan	Leon El-Alamin	55	5.48
Write-in		2	0.2
Total votes		1,003	100.0
General election
Nonpartisan	Eric Mays	709	50.18
Nonpartisan	Anita Brown	702	49.68
Write-in		2	0.14
Total votes		1,413	100.0
