= List of Joe Biden 2020 presidential campaign municipal endorsements =

This is a list of notable municipal officials who have endorsed Joe Biden's campaign for President of the United States in the 2020 U.S. presidential election.

== Mayors ==
=== Current ===
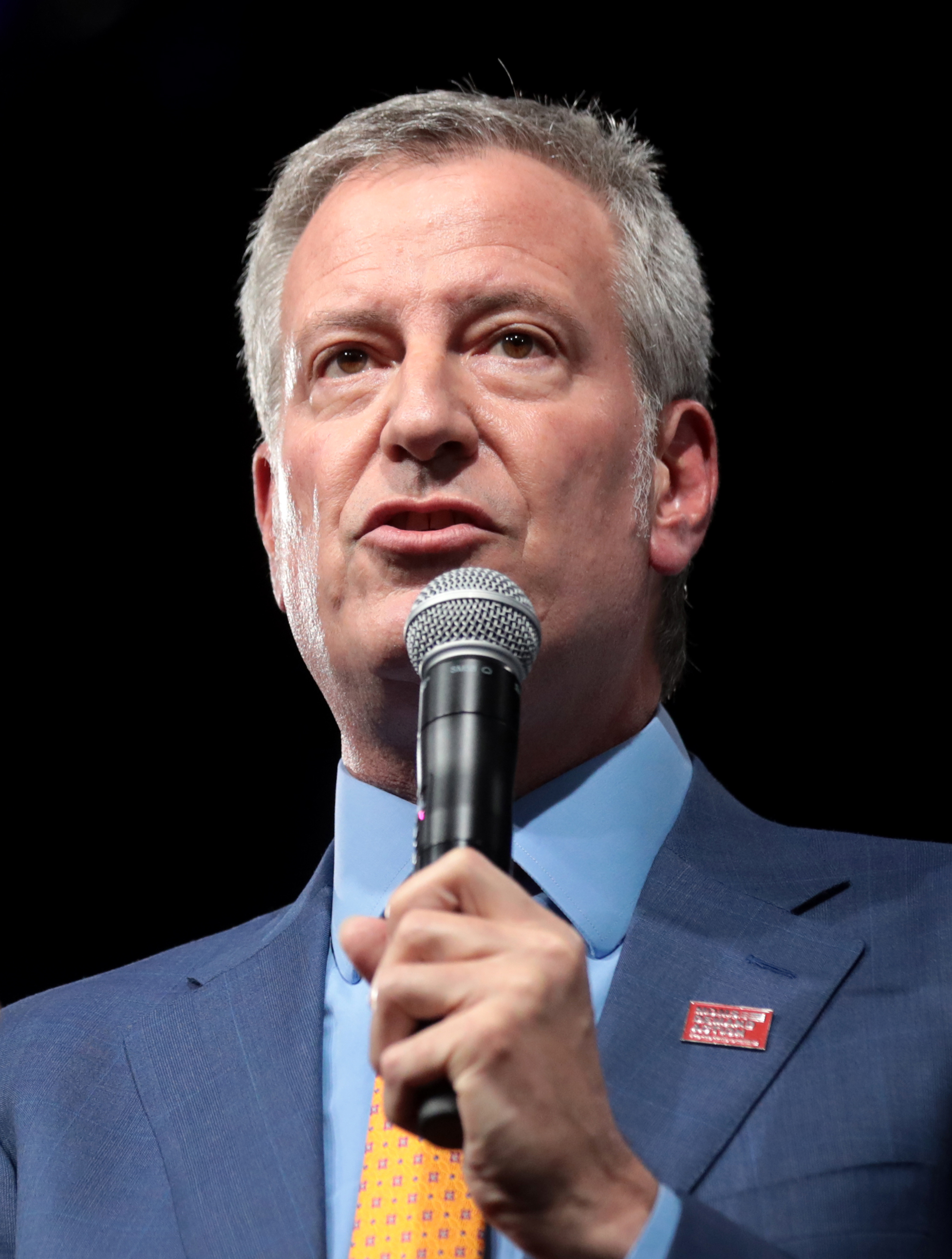
Bill de Blasio

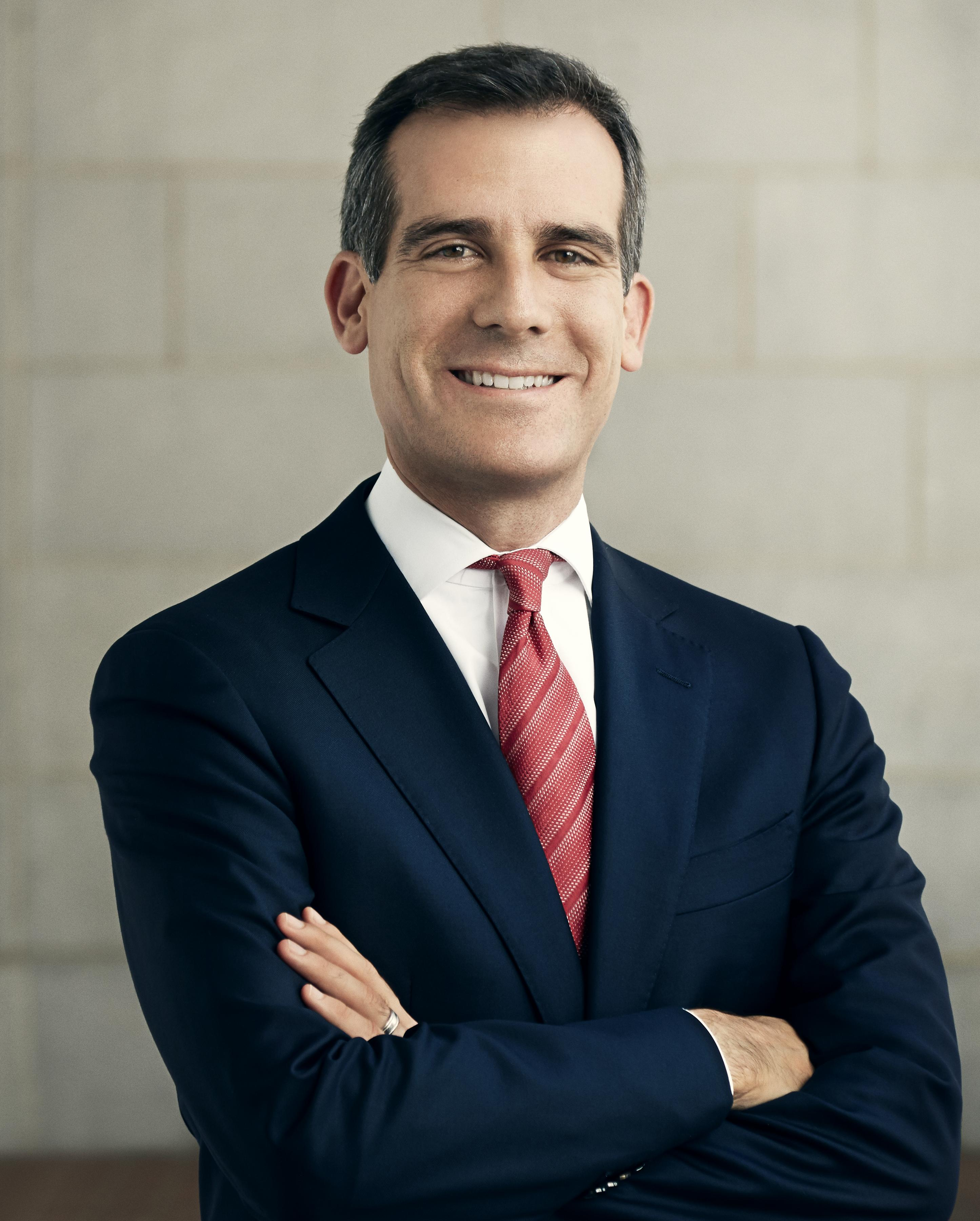
Eric Garcetti

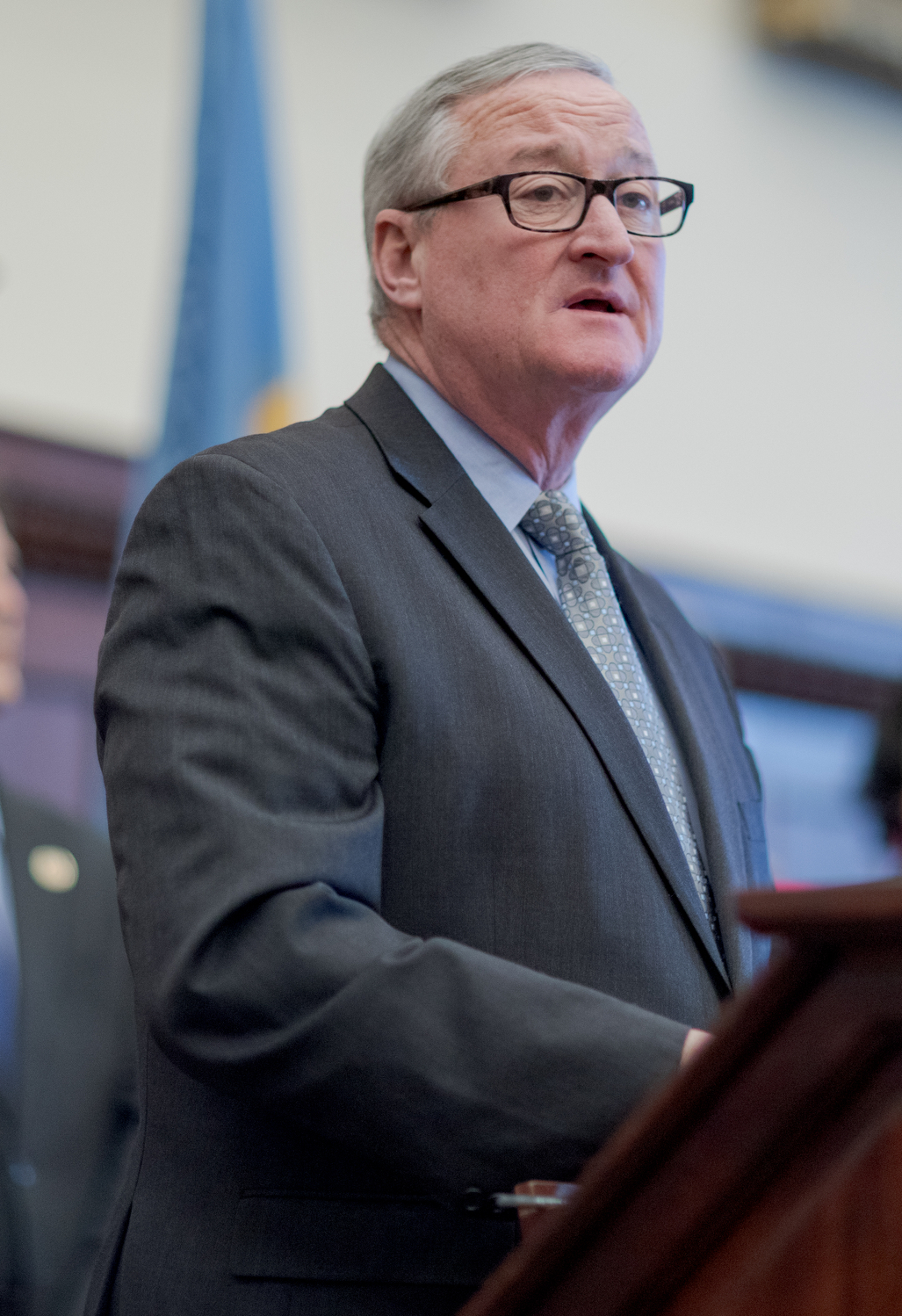
Jim Kenney

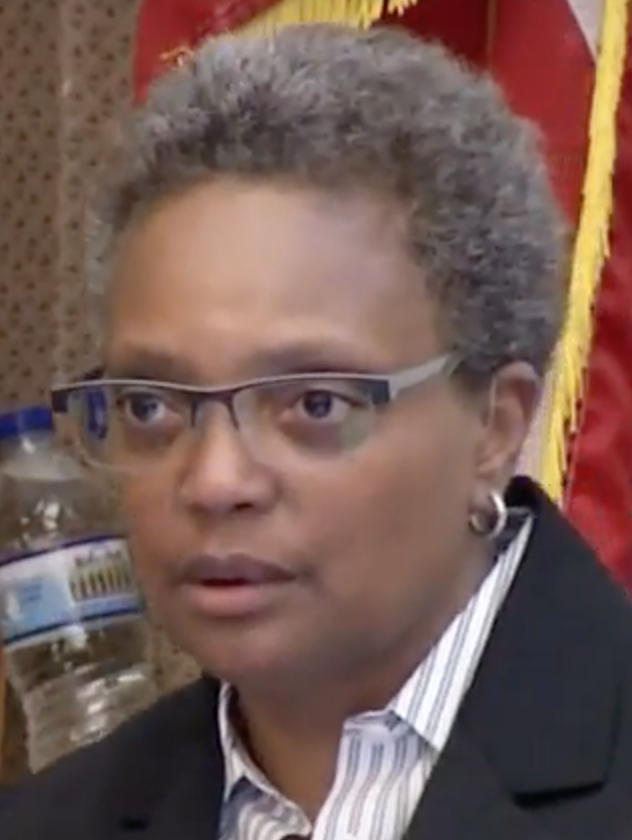
Lori Lightfoot

Sylvester Turner

- José Román Abreu, Mayor of San Lorenzo, Puerto Rico (2001–2021)
- Steve Adler, Mayor of Austin, Texas (2016–2023) (Note: Previously endorsed Pete Buttigieg.)
- Carlos Delgado Altieri, President of the Popular Democratic Party of Puerto Rico (2020–present), Mayor of Isabela, Puerto Rico (2001–2021), candidate for governor in 2020 (Popular Democratic)
- Tom Barrett, Mayor of Milwaukee Wisconsin (2004–2021)
- Stephen K. Benjamin, Mayor of Columbia, South Carolina (2010–2022) (Note: Previously endorsed Michael Bloomberg.)
- Andy Berke, Mayor of Chattanooga, Tennessee (2013–2021)
- Ravinder Bhalla, Mayor of Hoboken, New Jersey (2018–present)
- Percy Bland, Mayor of Meridian, Mississippi (2013–2021)
- Rosalynn Bliss, Mayor of Grand Rapids, Michigan (2016–present)
- Keisha Lance Bottoms, Mayor of Atlanta, Georgia (2018–2022)
- London Breed, Mayor of San Francisco, California (2017–present) (previously endorsed Kamala Harris, then Michael Bloomberg) (Note: Previously endorsed multiple candidates.)
- Luke Bronin, Mayor of Hartford, Connecticut (2016–2024)
- Aja Brown, Mayor of Compton, California (2013–2021)
- Christopher Cabaldon, Mayor of West Sacramento, California (1998–2020)
- LaToya Cantrell, Mayor of New Orleans, Louisiana (2018–2026)
- Melvin Carter, Mayor of Saint Paul, Minnesota (2018–2026)
- Jane Castor, Mayor of Tampa, Florida (2019–present)
- Steve Chirico, Mayor of Naperville, Illinois (2015–2023) (Republican)
- Mitch Colvin, Mayor of Fayetteville, NC (2017–present)
- John Cranley, Mayor of Cincinnati, Ohio (2013–2022)
- John E. Dailey, Mayor of Tallahassee, Florida (2018–present)
- Hardie Davis, Mayor of Augusta, Georgia (2015–2022)
- Jerry Demings, Mayor of Orange County, Florida (2018–present)
- Mike Duggan, Mayor of Detroit, Michigan (2014–2026)
- Jenny Durkan, Mayor of Seattle, Washington (2017–2021), U.S. Attorney for the Western District of Washington (2009–2014)
- Buddy Dyer, Mayor of Orlando, Florida (2003–present)
- Greg Fischer, Mayor of Louisville, Kentucky (2011–2023)
- Jacob Frey, Mayor of Minneapolis, Minnesota (2018–present)
- Steven Fulop, Mayor of Jersey City, New Jersey (2013–2026)
- Kate Gallego, Mayor of Phoenix, AZ (2019–present)
- Eric Garcetti, Mayor of Los Angeles, California (2013–2022)
- Robert Garcia, Mayor of Long Beach, California (2014–2022) (Note: Previously endorsed Kamala Harris.)
- Dan Gelber, Mayor of Miami Beach, Florida (2017–2023), Minority Leader of the Florida House of Representatives (2006–2008)
- Andrew Ginther, Mayor of Columbus, Ohio (2016–present)
- Michael Hancock, Mayor of Denver, Colorado (2011–2023)
- Lee Harris, Mayor of Shelby County, Tennessee (2018–present), Tennessee State Senator from District 17 (2015–2018) and Tennessee Senate Minority Leader (2015–2018)
- Dan Horrigan, Mayor of Akron, Ohio (2016–2024)
- Christine Hunschofsky, Mayor of Parkland, Florida (2017–2020)
- Sadaf Jaffer, Mayor of Montgomery Township, New Jersey (2019–2020)
- Teri Johnston, Mayor of Key West, Florida (2018–2024)
- Wade Kapszukiewicz, Mayor of Toledo, Ohio, (2018–present)
- Jim Kenney, Mayor of Philadelphia, Pennsylvania (2016–2023)
- Lyda Krewson, Mayor of St. Louis, Missouri (2017–2021)
- Rick Kriseman, Mayor of St. Petersburg, Florida (2014–2022)
- Emily Larson, Mayor of Duluth, Minnesota (2016–2024)
- Lydia Lavelle, Mayor of Carrboro, North Carolina (2013–2021)
- Sam Liccardo, Mayor of San Jose, California (2014–2023)
- Vi Lyles, Mayor of Charlotte, North Carolina (2017–present)
- David R. Mayer, Mayor of Gloucester Township, New Jersey (2010–present)
- María Meléndez, Mayor of Ponce, Puerto Rico (2009–2021)
- Darrio Melton, Mayor of Selma, Alabama (2016–2020)
- Erin Mendenhall, Mayor of Salt Lake City, Utah (2020–present)
- Ken Miyagishima, Mayor of Las Cruces, New Mexico (2007–2023)
- Frank Moran, Mayor of Camden, New Jersey (2018–2021)
- Svante Myrick, Mayor of Ithaca, New York (2012–2022)
- Sheldon Neeley, Mayor of Flint, Michigan (2019–present), Michigan State Representative (2015–2019)
- Bill Peduto, Mayor of Pittsburgh, Pennsylvania (2014–2022)
- Andre Quintero, Mayor of El Monte, California (2009–2020)
- Satya Rhodes-Conway, Mayor of Madison, Wisconsin (2019–present)
- Hazelle P. Rogers, Mayor of Lauderdale Lakes, Florida (2018–2022)
- Regina Romero, Mayor of Tucson, Arizona (2019–present)
- Mary Salas, Mayor of Chula Vista, California (2014–2022)
- Libby Schaaf, Mayor of Oakland, California (2015–2023)
- Andy Schor, Mayor of Lansing, Michigan (2018–present)
- Frank Scott Jr., Mayor of Little Rock, Arkansas (2019–present)
- Kathy Sheehan, Mayor of Albany, New York (2014–2025)
- Marty Small Sr., Mayor of Atlantic City, New Jersey (2019–present)
- Darrell Steinberg, Mayor of Sacramento, California (2016–present)
- Levar Stoney, Mayor of Richmond, Virginia (2017–present), Secretary of the Commonwealth of Virginia (2014–2016)
- Jim Strickland, Mayor of Memphis, Tennessee (2016–2024)
- Sean Strub, Mayor of Milford, Pennsylvania (2017–present)
- John Tecklenburg, Mayor of Charleston, South Carolina (2016–2024)
- Michael Tubbs, Mayor of Stockton, California (2017–2021)
- Sylvester Turner, Mayor of Houston, Texas (2016–2024)
- Ben Walsh, Mayor of Syracuse, New York (2018–present) (Reform/Independence)
- Stephen T. Williams, Mayor of Huntington, West Virginia (2013–present)
- Marty Walsh, Mayor of Boston, Massachusetts (2014–2021), Massachusetts State Representative (1997–2014)
- Nan Whaley, Mayor of Dayton, Ohio (2014–2022)
- Jenny Wilson, Mayor of Salt Lake County, Utah (2019–present)
- Victoria Woodards, Mayor of Tacoma, Washington (2018–present)
- Randall Woodfin, Mayor of Birmingham, Alabama (2017–present)
- Nelson Torres Yordán, Mayor of Guayanilla, Puerto Rico (2016–2021)
- Jack Young, Mayor of Baltimore, Maryland (2019–present)

=== Former ===
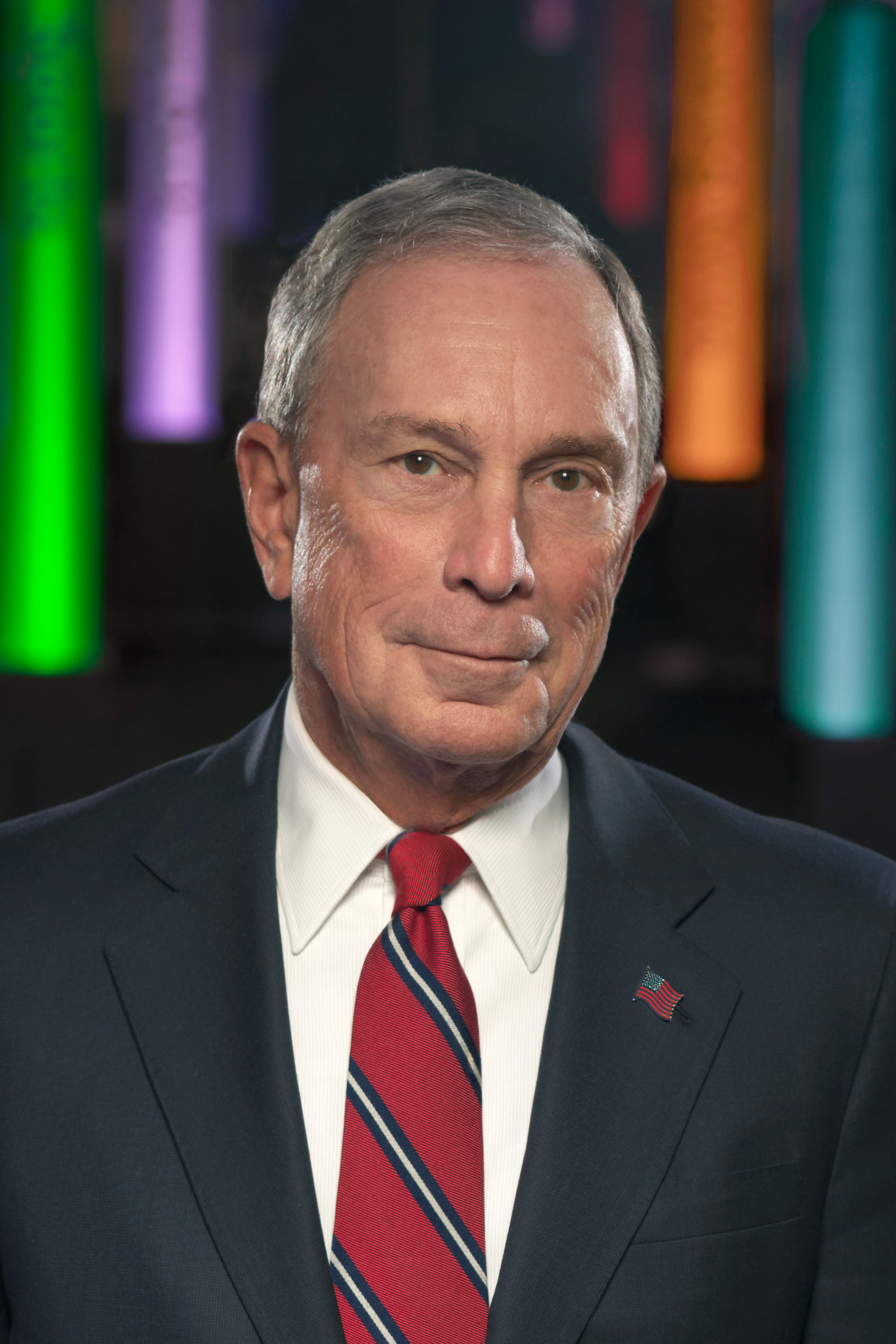
Michael Bloomberg

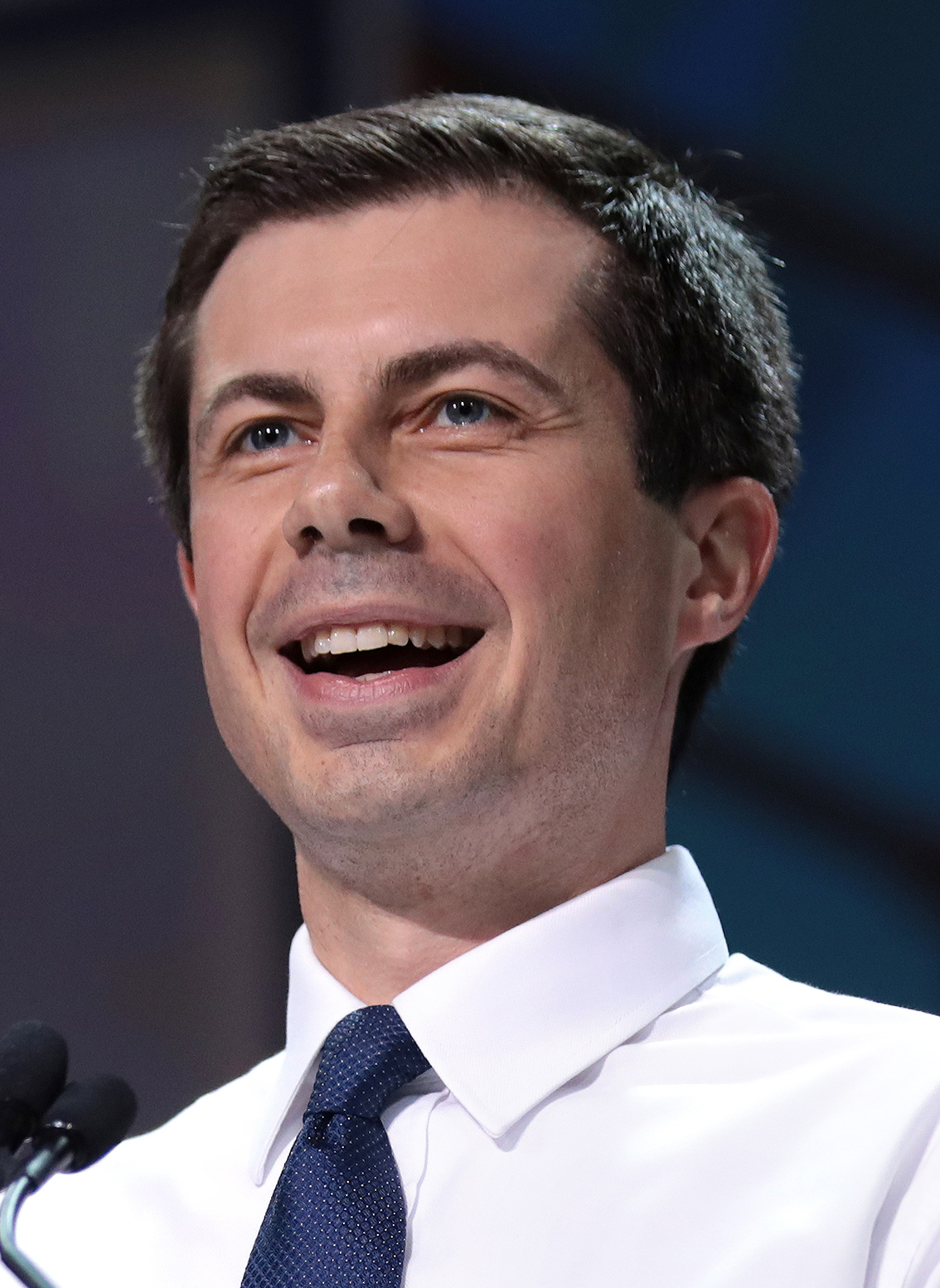
Pete Buttigieg

- Robert A. Baines, Mayor of Manchester, New Hampshire (2000–2006)
- Ralph Becker, Mayor of Salt Lake City, Utah (2008–2016)
- Michael Bloomberg, Mayor of New York City, New York (2002–2013), 2020 candidate for president (Formerly Republican and Independent, Democratic since 2018)
- Bob Buckhorn, Mayor of Tampa, Florida (2011–2019)
- Tim Burgess, Mayor of Seattle, Washington (2017)
- Pete Buttigieg, Mayor of South Bend, Indiana (2012–2020), 2020 candidate for president
- Michael B. Coleman, Mayor of Columbus, Ohio (2000–2016)
- John Cook, Mayor of El Paso, Texas (2005–2013)
- Peter Corroon, Mayor of Salt Lake City, Utah (2004–2013)
- Karl Dean, Mayor of Nashville, Tennessee (2007–2015)
- Pat Evans, Mayor of Plano, Texas (2002–2009)
- Sandra Freedman, Mayor of Tampa, Florida (1986–1995)
- Andrew Gillum, Mayor of Tallahassee (2014–2018)
- Bill Gluba, Mayor of Davenport, Iowa (2008–2016)
- Wilson Goode, Mayor of Philadelphia, Pennsylvania (1984–1992)
- Phil Gordon, Mayor of Phoenix, Arizona (2004–2012)
- Mike Guingona, Mayor of Daly City, California (1993–2018)
- Phil Hardberger, Mayor of San Antonio, Texas (2005–2009)
- Pat Hays, Mayor of North Little Rock, Arkansas (1989–2013)
- Sly James, Mayor of Kansas City, Missouri (2011–2019)
- Jan Laverty Jones, Mayor of Las Vegas, Nevada (1991–1999)
- Sukhee Kang, Mayor of Irvine, California (2008–2012)
- Mark Mallory, Mayor of Cincinnati, Ohio (2005–2013)
- Michael Nutter, Mayor of Philadelphia, Pennsylvania (2008–2016)
- Douglas Palmer, Mayor of Trenton, New Jersey (1990–2010)
- Annise Parker, Mayor of Houston, Texas (2010–2016)
- Mike Rawlings, Mayor of Dallas, Texas (2011–2019), CEO of Pizza Hut (1997–2002)
- Stephanie Rawlings-Blake, Mayor of Baltimore, Maryland (2010–2016)
- Norm Rice, Mayor of Seattle, Washington (1990–1998)
- Joseph P. Riley Jr., Mayor of Charleston, South Carolina (1975–2016)
- Michael Signer, Mayor of Charlottesville, Virginia (2016–2018)
- Francis Slay, Mayor of St. Louis (2001–2017)
- Mark Stodola, Mayor of Little Rock, Arkansas (2007–2018)
- Kathy Taylor, Mayor of Tulsa, Oklahoma (2006–2009)
- Karen Weaver, Mayor of Flint, Michigan (2015–2019)
- Wellington Webb, Mayor of Denver, Colorado (1991–2003)
- Bill de Blasio, Mayor of New York City, New York (2014–2021), 2020 candidate for president (Note: Previously endorsed Bernie Sanders.)
- Lori Lightfoot, Mayor of Chicago, Illinois (2019–2023)

== Other municipal officials ==
=== Current ===
- Art Acevedo, Chief of Police of the Houston Police Department (2016–present)
- Angela Alsobrooks, County Executive of Prince George's County, MD (2018–present)
- Steve Bellone, County Executive of Suffolk County, NY (2012–present)
- Melissa Conyears, City Treasurer of Chicago (2019–present)
- Rich Fitzgerald, Chief Executive of Allegheny County (2012–present)
- Kim Foxx, Cook County State's Attorney (2016–present)
- Lina Hidalgo, County Judge of Harris County, TX (2019–present)
- Larry Krasner, District Attorney of Philadelphia (2018–present)
- Mike Reese, Sheriff of Multnomah County, Oregon (2016–present)

=== Former ===
- Phil Heimlich, Cincinnati City Councilor (1993–2001) (Republican)
- Suzy Loftus, San Francisco District Attorney (2019–2020)
- Rick Romley, County Attorney for Maricopa County, AZ (2010, 1989–2005) (Republican)

== Local legislators ==
=== Current ===
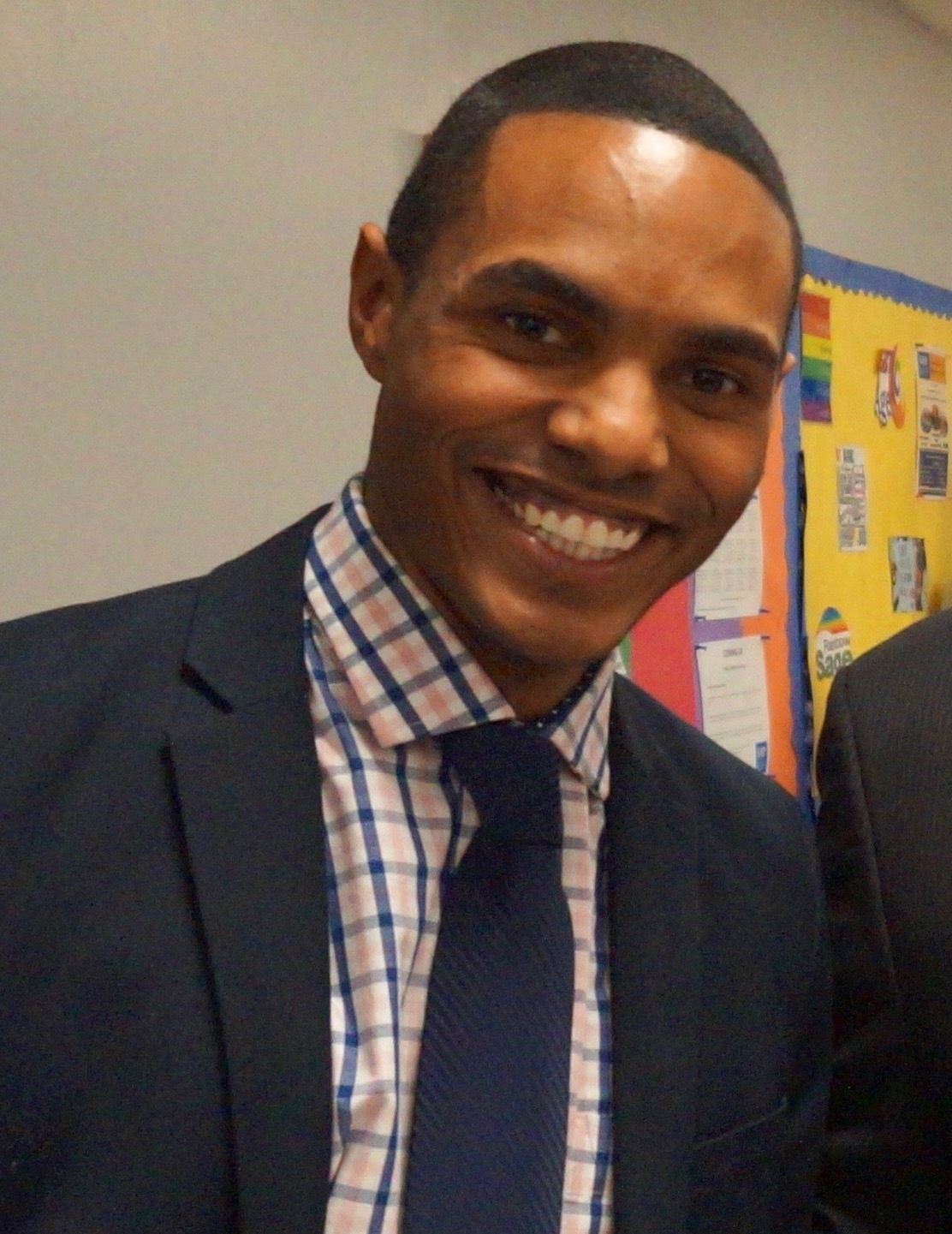
Ritchie Torres

- Frank Baker, Boston City Councilor (2011–present)
- Cindy Bass, Philadelphia City Councilor (2012–present)
- Kendra Brooks, Philadelphia City Councilor (2019–present) (Working Families Party)
- Darrell L. Clarke, President of the Philadelphia City Council (2012–present), Philadelphia City Councilor (1999–present)
- John Collins-Muhammad, St. Louis Alderman from Ward 21 (2017–present)
- Derek S. Green, Philadelphia City Councilor (2014–present)
- Helen Gym, Philadelphia City Councilor (2016–present)
- Debora Juarez, Seattle City Councilor from District 5 (2016–present)
- Mark Kersey, San Diego City Councilor (2012–present) (Independent)
- Ann Kobayashi, Honolulu City Councilor from District 5 (2009–present, 2002–2008), Hawaii State Senator from District 10 (1981–1994)
- Stephe Koontz, Doraville City Counselor (2018–present)
- Paul Koretz, Los Angeles City Councilor (2009–present)
- Joey Manahan, Honolulu City Councilor from District 7 (2013–present), Hawaii State representative from District 29 (2007–2013)
- Kevin McManus, Member of the Kansas City, Missouri City Council from District 6 (2015–present)
- Vop Osili, president of the Indianapolis City-County Council (2018–present), Indianapolis City-County Council from District 11 (2012–present)
- Cherelle Parker, Philadelphia City Councilor (2016–present)
- Kymberly Pine, Honolulu City Councilor from District 1 (2013–2021), Hawaii State Representative from District 43 (2004–2012)
- Lewis E. Reed, President of the St. Louis Board of Aldermen (2017–present)
- Brandon Scott, President of the Baltimore City Councilor (2019–present), Member of the Baltimore City Council from District 2 (2011–2019)
- P.G. Sittenfeld, Cincinnati City Councilor (2011–present)
- Mark Squilla, Philadelphia City Councilor (2014–present)
- Marian B. Tasco, Philadelphia City Councilor (1998–2016)
- Ritchie Torres, New York City City Councilor (2014–2021) and 2020 nominee for New York's 15th congressional district

=== Former ===
- Martha Choe, Seattle City Councilor (1991–1998)
- Alex Wan, Atlanta City Counselor (2010–2018)

== Judicial officials ==
=== Current ===
- Lina Hidalgo, County Judge of Harris County, Texas (2019–present)
- Nelson Wolff, County Judge of Bexar County, Texas (2001–present), Mayor of San Antonio, Texas (1991–1995) (Note: Previously endorsed Julian Castro.)

=== Former ===
- Kevin A. Ross, Judge on the Los Angeles County Superior Court (1999–2005) (Republican)

== See also ==
- Endorsements in the 2020 Democratic Party presidential primaries
- News media endorsements in the 2020 United States presidential primaries
- News media endorsements in the 2020 United States presidential election
- List of Donald Trump 2020 presidential campaign political endorsements
- List of Donald Trump 2020 presidential campaign non-political endorsements
- List of former Trump administration officials who endorsed Joe Biden
- List of Jo Jorgensen 2020 presidential campaign endorsements
- List of Howie Hawkins 2020 presidential campaign endorsements
- List of Republicans who opposed the Donald Trump 2020 presidential campaign
