= Karegnondi Water Authority =

Michigan water provider

Agency overview
- Formed: October 26, 2010
- Agency executives: Gregory L. Alexander, Board Chair; Jeff Wright, chief executive officer
- Website: karegnondi.com

Karegnondi Water Authority (KWA) is a municipal corporation responsible for distributing water services in the Mid-Michigan and Thumb areas of the U.S. state of Michigan. Members of the authority are the cities of Flint and Lapeer, and the counties of Genesee, Lapeer and Sanilac. Karegnondi is a word from the Petan Indian language meaning "lake" and another early name for Lake Huron.

== Background ==
Flint built its first water treatment plant (now defunct) in 1917. The city built a second plant in 1952. At the time of Flint's population peak and economic height (when the city was the center of the automobile industry), Flint's plants pumped 100 million gallons (380,000 m^{3}) of water per day. With the decline of the city's industry and a significant drop in the city's population (from almost 200,000 in 1960 to about 80,000 today), Flint pumped less water. By October 2015, when the Flint plant ended full time operations again, it pumped just 16 million gallons (61,000 m^{3}) daily.

In 1963, Flint moved to build a pipeline from Lake Huron to Flint, but a profiteering scandal derailed that pipeline. This led the city to sign a contract to purchase water for 30 years from the Detroit Water and Sewerage Department on June 6, 1964.

For years, the City of Flint purchased Lake Huron water from the Detroit Water and Sewerage Department (Detroit Water) under a now expired 30-year contract. Flint resold the water to the Genesee County Drain Commissioner who then sold it to municipalities in the county. Genesee County officials had disliked the high cost and usually high percentage increases of the Detroit Water, as the Department's formula penalized the area for its elevation and distance from Detroit.

Detroit Water avoided direct rate discussions with Genesee County, working only with the city of Flint. Sanilac County has never previously had a public water system depending on individual wells instead. The City of Lapeer has been a member of the Greater Lapeer County Utilities Authority (GLCUA) which purchases water from Detroit Water.

Future members that are clients of Detroit Water (Flint City, Genesee County and GLCUA) use 10% of the water but pay 21% of the costs.

For years there has been talk among Genesee County officials about building a Lake Huron pipeline. The plan would build a pipeline from a 230-acre site located on the Sanilac-St. Clair County border. In 2006, the Genesee County Drain Commission had a feasibility study done which reawakened talk of a new pipeline. While estimated costs of the pipeline is around $600 million, County officials indicated that an authority-owned pipeline would cost less than continued purchasing Detroit water in the long-term.

In 2002, Genesee County had purchased "326 acres of scenic woods, grassy meadows and 300 feet of lake frontage" from Detroit Edison in an auction for $2.7 million.

=== Karegnondi Regional Water Planning Group ===
In May 2007, Genesee County Drain Commissioner and Oakland County Drain Commissioner chose the name Karegnondi Regional Water Planning Group, the forerunner planning group for the Authority.

Environmental groups indicated in May 2009 that they did not have any issue with the Lake Huron pipeline plan as long as Genesee County Drain Commission files for the needed permits. In June, Cheboygan County Drain Commissioner Dennis G. Lennox II indicated that he might file a lawsuit to revoke a permit to use Lake Huron water if approved by Michigan Department of Environmental Quality, believing that Lake Huron's future would be jeopardized.

In August 2009, a permit was issued in compliance with the 2008 Great Lakes Compact by the Michigan Department of Environmental Quality for the withdrawal of 85 million gallons per day of water as a public water supply for Genesee County, the City of Flint and other potential customers: the Counties of Lapeer and Sanilac and City of Lapeer.

Lennox filed an appeal of the issuance of the permit before the State Office of Administrative Hearings and Rules while in October Cheboygan County Board of Commissioners indicated that they were not supporting Lennox's appeal.

On August 17, the Lapeer City Commission unanimously voted to be active in the Karegnondi Planning Group.

Lapeer City's estimated share of the cost of $100 million would include a water treatment plant. In late October 2009, representatives for possible authority members met to decide under which state law to form the authority. On November 5, a meeting was held regarding the associated project.

In March 2010, former pipeline supporter and former Genesee County Drain Commissioner Ken Hardin came out against the project, based on the City of Flint's poor financial condition. Instead, he recommended that the county seek a seat on a regional water board with Detroit. A request for bids was issued by the county for testing the Lake Huron pumping station's soil.

On March 2, 2010, Lennox filed to withdraw his appeal of the issuance of the water permit to KWA due to limited funds. Lapeer City Commission approved the articles of incorporation in early April. On April 13, the Genesee County Board of Commissioners unanimously approved the articles of incorporation.

The Lapeer County Board of Commissioners voted to join the authority on April 24 followed by the Lapeer City Commission and Flint City Council on April 26.

== History ==
On October 26, 2010, the Karegnondi Water Authority Board of Trustees met for the first time with representatives from the incorporating Cities of Flint (Mayor Dayne Walling), Lapeer (City Manager Dale Kerbyson), and County Drain Commissioners of Genesee (Jeff Wright), Lapeer (John Cosens) and Sanilac (Gregory L. Alexander).

Walling was elected chair. While Genesee County Drain Commissioner Wright was selected as the Agency's CEO and replaced on the Board by Genesee County Board of Commissioner Chair Jamie Curtis as Genesee County's representative, Alexander was chosen as vice chair, Flint City Council President Delrico Loyd was chosen as Treasurer and Amy Planck of Lapeer County for secretary. Ten additional Trustees were to be appointed based on expected water usage.

In May 2011, DTE Energy indicated an interest in buying three million gallons of untreated lake water daily for its Greenwood electrical plant. St. Clair County also indicated that it was considering joining the Authority, while Flint was still considering whether or not to sign on to getting KWA water with Mayor Dayne Walling supporting the move. In June, the Detroit Water and Sewerage Department negotiated with the KWA. The expected online date of the new pipeline was 2015.

On September 7, Rowe Engineering reported to the Flint City Council that the most expensive option was to continue with Detroit Water with the next expensive option was upgrading the City's Flint River plant for 24-hour 7-day-a-week operations and the least expensive option was the KWA Lake Huron pipeline.

With Flint placed under the control of an Emergency Manager in December, the authority wanted a decision by year's end on whether the city would continue with the pipeline.

In May 2012, Genesee County moved to sell 40 acres of the Lake Huron property that the county purchased in 2002 and was expecting to get $350,000 for the land. The 40 acres was sold to the Genesee County Drain Commission in January 2013 for $346,000.

On January 11, 2013, the Authority received the final permit from the Army Corps of Engineers to build the Karegnondi pipeline. In February, L. D'Agostini & Sons was the low bidder ($24.6 million, which is less than the engineers' estimated $27 million) to build the massive intake into Lake Huron.

On April 12, Oakland County Water Resources Commissioner Jim Nash and County Executive L. Brooks Patterson came out against the KWA water pipeline because of the increased cost burden on remaining customers of the Detroit Water system. L. D'Agostini & Sons again was awarded a contract for the pump station with a bid of $11.05 million (a saving of $2.75 million below estimates).

On March 25, 2013, the Flint City Council approved 7–1 to purchase 16 million gallons per day from the KWA, the lone no vote going with Flint River water as a permanent supply.

Flint emergency manager Ed Kurtz and Mayor Dayne Walling approved the action on March 29 and forwarded the action for the State Treasurer to approve. The Detroit Water and Sewer Department (DWSD) sent out a press release demanding that the state should block Flint's request, as it would hurt Detroit Water, and start a "water war". The release also outlined 4 options for Flint including the sale of raw untreated water. Genesee County Drain Commissioner Wright replied that: "It would be unprecedented for the state to force one community to enter into an agreement with another, simply to artificially help one community at the other's expense. This is exactly what the (Detroit Water and Sewerage Department) is arguing should be done. If the DWSD was serious they would contact the appropriate officials instead of negotiating through the media."

On April 15, State Treasurer Andy Dillon gave approval to Kurtz to enter into a water purchase contract with the KWA. EM Kurtz signed the KWA water purchase agreement on April 16. On April 17, the Detroit Water and Sewer Department gave its one year termination notice to the city just days after the County and City rejected the DWSD' last offer. The DWSD expected Flint to pay them for "'stranded costs,' or past investments in the water system that have benefited customers in this area." Flint and Genesee rejected such responsibility, although they would be willing to purchase some pipeline. Governor Rick Snyder called a meeting of the three parties for April 19.

=== Construction ===
On June 28, 2013, a ground breaking ceremony for the pipeline project took place at the authority's Lake Huron property.

The authority entered final negotiations in September 2013 on an agreement for American Cast Iron Pipe Company to supply 67 miles of spiral weld and iron pipe, additional fittings, bends, reducers and hydrant tees with the final cost expected to be $84.1 million while the estimated cost was $104 million. Two other bids were received from Northwest Pipe ($81.2 million) and Hansen Pipe ($101.8 million).

An August 1 Genesee County $53 million Bond sale was postponed due to the City of Detroit filing for bankruptcy. The county sold $35 million in bonds in September that were delayed from August.

On October 16, 2013, ten additional trustees were added to the board of trustees: former state House Minority Leader Richard Hammel; Johsua Freeman, Flint City Council; Larry Green, Mt. Morris Township supervisor; Ted Henry, Genesee County commissioner; Micki Hoffman, Grand Blanc Township supervisor; Steve Landaal, president of Landaal Packaging; Sheldon Neeley, Flint City Council; Thomas Svcek, Swartz Creek Department of Public Works director; Tracey Tucker, Flint Township building administrator; and Paula Zelenko, mayor of Burton.

In November 2013, American Cast Iron Pipe Company became the first to build a production facility in Flint's former Buick City site purchasing the property from the RACER Trust. In early December 2013, a German-made micro-tunnel boring machine was scheduled to begin the horizontally drilling out 60 feet below Lake Huron and would take 30 months to complete.

In March 2014, the KWA put out to market $220 million in bonds with excellent ratings from the credit rating agencies putting interest rates to about 5% or lower. The City of Flint began its temporary use of Flint River water as its primary source of drinking water on April 25, 2014 while Genesee County continued to purchase from Detroit water.

The U.S. Environmental Protection Agency and the Karegnondi Water Authority began discussion in April regarding how to proceed with protected endangered Northern riffleshell in the Black River in Sanilac County which might force the authority to move from an open-cut to the more expensive boring under the river.

In May 2014, the Imlay City area intermediate pump station construction was awarded to E&L Construction Group at a bid price of $11.78 million, $6.82 million less than the estimated $18.6 million. In June, Zito Construction Company, of Grand Blanc, Michigan, won a pipeline contract for installing iron transmission main along the line.

Flint emergency manager Darnell Earley finalized the sale of an Eastern Genesee County 9-mile section of water pipeline to Genesee County for $3.9 million. This pipeline feeds Detroit water to the county and after the Huron pipeline is active would service the Eastern part of the county.

Meanwhile, the City of Flint was having problems with its water system, rising to a crisis; having to issue boil water notices, issue warning notices for a year over a one time spike in TTMs, and culminating with findings of lead contamination. Flint's reconnection to the Great Lakes Water Authority (formerly called Detroit Water) system was announced on October 8, 2015.

The KWA board met on November 25, 2015 to elect new leadership. Newly elected Flint Mayor Karen Weaver, Flint City Councilman Eric Mays and Laura Sullivan became new board members at that meeting. With Flint Mayor Walling losing his election, Mayor Weaver nominated herself as chair due to Walling previously holding the position. Instead, current vice chair & Sanilac Drain Commissioner Alexander was selected chair with Genesee County Commission chair Curtis was selected as vice chair.

=== Operational ===
Connections to the new KWA water source began in 2017. Beginning in July, water was being transported by the KWA pipeline from Lake Huron to the Genesee County treatment plant. Genesee County had been testing its treated water since August 2017. A 30-year contract with the Great Lakes Water Authority (GLWA) on November 21, 2017 was approved by Flint City Council members voting 5-4. On Monday, November 27, 2017, the northern loop set of municipalities began receiving water from the KWA pipeline and treated by Genesee County Drain Commission Water and Waste Division. The northern group consisted of cities of Clio, Flushing, Montrose and Mt. Morris and townships of Davison, Flushing, Genesee, Montrose, Richfield, Thetford and Vienna.

The southern group started receiving water from the KWA and Genesee Water on December 15, 2017. The southern group consists of the cities of Burton and Swartz Creek and the townships of Clayton, Flint, Gaines, Mundy and Grand Blanc.

== See also ==
- Beecher Metropolitan Water and Sewer District
- Great Lakes Water Authority
