= Brenda Clack =

American politician (born 1945)

Member of the Michigan House of Representatives from the 34th district
- In office January 1, 2003 – December 31, 2008
- Preceded by: Dave Woodward
- Succeeded by: Woodrow Stanley

County Commissioner
- Incumbent
- Assumed office 2009
- Preceded by: Woodrow Stanley
- Constituency: Genesee County 2nd District

Personal details
- Born: July 22, 1945 (age 81)
- Party: Democratic
- Spouse: Floyd Clack

Brenda Clack (born July 22, 1945) is an American politician from Michigan. She is a Democrat and was until 2009 a member of the Michigan State House of Representatives. She represented the 34th House District (map), which is located in Genesee County, and includes much of the city of Flint. She chaired the Families and Children's Services Committee.

== Early life ==
Clack graduated from Tennessee State University in 1969, receiving her Bachelor of Science degree in education. She graduated from Eastern Michigan University. She worked as a teacher in the Flint Area public school system for several years. She was chosen as Michigan's economics teacher of the year in 1995. She is married to former State Representative Floyd Clack, and they have two children. Clack is African-American.

== Political career ==
Clack was elected to the State House in 2002. She represented the 34th district, which includes much of the city of Flint and is overwhelmingly Democratic. She never faced a serious challenge for re-election. Term limits prevented her from running for re-election in 2008. She sat on the Education, Families and Children's Services, Health Policy, and the New Economy and Quality of Life Committees. In 2008, Clack ran for and won election the First District Genesee County Board of Commissioners.

Finished in second place in the 2009 Flint Mayoral primary. With 16.22 percent of the vote, she edged out Darryl E. Buchanan by 14 votes. On August 4, 2009, Clack lost the special general mayoral election against Dayne Walling.
