= Michael Brown (Michigan politician) =

American city administrator

Acting Mayor of Flint
- In office February 16, 2009 – August 5, 2009
- Preceded by: Don Williamson
- Succeeded by: Dayne Walling

City administrator of Flint, Michigan
- In office February 4, 2009 – August 5, 2009
- Preceded by: Darryl Buchanan
- Succeeded by: Gregory Eason

Genesee County commissioner
- In office 1983–1983

Personal details
- Spouse: Linda
- Children: 5
- Education: St. Michael's of Flint, Michigan

Michael Brown is the former city administrator and former emergency manager of Flint, Michigan, US. He also served as temporary mayor and city administrator of Flint after the resignation of Don Williamson.

== Early life ==
Brown came to Flint after his civil engineer father accepted a Buick plant job. Brown attended St. Michael Catholic School in Flint.

== Career ==
He attended Western Michigan University then later Stockholm University in Sweden earning his master's degree. In 1970, he was married to Linda. He worked with youth as a counselor.

== Public service ==
In 1983, Brown was elected to the Genesee County Board of Commissioners. Flint mayor, Matthew S. Collier, appointed Brown as the City's director of governmental relations and later in the 1980s as director of Flint's Community and Economic Development department. Brown was the executive director of the Genesee area Red Cross chapter from 1994 to 1996. He moved on to be president of the United Way of Genesee and Lapeer Counties from 1996 to 2002. In 2002, after the recall of Flint Mayor Woodrow Stanley, Brown took out petitions to run for mayor but failed to collect sufficient signatures to be on the ballot.

Hired as president of Capital Area United Way in Lansing, Brown stepped in to straighten operations out after a $2 million embezzlement occurred in 2002. Brown left that position in November and was hired by the Genesee Regional Chamber of Commerce in November 2009 as executive vice-president.

He was appointed city administrator on Wednesday, February 4, 2009. Effective at midnight on February 15, 2009, Brown as city administrator became temporary mayor in accordance with the City Charter following the resignation of Don Williamson for health reasons.

In 2009, he founded the Flint Area Reinvestment Office. He concurrently became president of the Prima Civitas Foundation and served in both position until December 1, 2011. The Michigan Governor, Rick Snyder, appointed Brown as the city's emergency manager on November 29, 2011, effective December 1. He immediately eliminated pay for the mayor and city council of the city, though these were later partially restored. Brown also issued a dozen executive orders over the course of his administration; these were mostly related to the city budget. Other actions taken included the sale of Genesee Towers, the tallest building in Flint, to a developer for $1. Although Brown was forced to step down from his position in August 2012 due to a technicality in state law, he was nominated by his successor, Ed Kurtz, to serve as city administrator. He later resigned from his position in September 2013, citing "family concerns."

Political offices
Preceded by Don Williamson	Mayor of Flint; 2009; Temporary	Succeeded by Dayne Walling
Preceded by Darryl Buchanan	City Administrator of Flint; 2009	Succeeded by Gregory Eason
