= 2017 Flint mayoral recall election =

- November 7, 2017
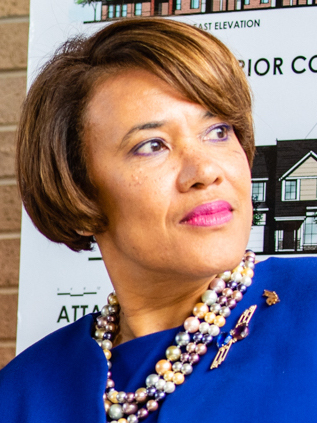

Candidate	Karen Weaver	Scott Kincaid	Don Pfeiffer
Party	Nonpartisan	Nonpartisan	Nonpartisan
Popular vote	7,709	4,671	894
Percentage	53.27%	32.28%	6.18%
Mayor before election
Karen Weaver
Nonpartisan
Elected mayor
Karen Weaver
Nonpartisan

The 2017 Flint mayoral recall election took place on November 7, 2017. Incumbent Mayor Karen Weaver ran to retain her seat after opponents, alleging corruption, gathered signatures to force a recall election two years into Weaver's term as Mayor. Seventeen opponents filed to run against Weaver in the election, the most prominent of which was City Councilman Scott Kincaid. Weaver ultimately prevailed in the recall election, winning 53 percent of the vote.

== Background ==
The City of Flint's contract with Republic Services for trash collection expired on June 30, 2016. Prior to the expiration of the contract, Mayor Karen Weaver recommended that the City enter into a $17 million contract with Rizzo Environmental Services for trash and recycling collection, which was $2 million less than Republic's proposal. The City Council rejected the recommendation in a 5–3 vote on June 27, and the city's contract with Republic was extended for a month to allow negotiations to continue. On July 18, the City Council voted down the contract by an 8–1 vote, with City Councilwoman Kate Fields criticizing Rizzo's concealment of its relationship with recalled former Mayor Woodrow Stanley. Trash service was suspended for a day when the contract with Republic expired, prompting City Councilman Scott Kincaid to file a lawsuit against Weaver, which the City Council voted to join. The lawsuit sought to prevent Weaver from using an emergency provision in the purchasing ordinance to award a contract to Rizzo. The Genesee County Circuit Court issued an injunction requiring the city to continue its contract with Republic for another 90 days while Weaver and the City Council negotiated. Weaver appealed the ruling, and the Michigan Court of Appeals stayed the ruling and allowed Weaver to authorize Rizzo to start collecting trash.

Shortly after Rizzo began providing service, however, several Macomb County officials were arrested by the Federal Bureau of Investigation on October 25, 2016, for taking bribes from Rizzo, prompting the company's chief executive to resign. After investigation became public, Weaver agreed to provide Republic with a one-year contract, which the City Council approved. Because the city was under financial receivership, the state Receivership Transition Advisory Board also had to approve the deal, which it did.

As a result of the controversy, recall language was submitted against Weaver four separate times. The first two submissions were rejected by the county election commission and the third was withdrawn. The fourth, filed by activist Arthur Woodson, ultimately approved. Weaver challenged the approval of the recall language, but Circuit Judge Geoffrey Neithercut determined that the recall language was valid, enabling Woodson to begin collecting signatures. In late June, Woodson submitted enough signatures to place the recall election on the ballot. Weaver challenged the legitimacy of the recall petitions, arguing that more than a thousand signatures were illegitimate, but the challenge were rejected and the recall was scheduled for November 7, 2017. The city police department opened an investigation into alleged fraud in the petition gathering, which resulted in several witnesses claiming that city police officers ordered them to testify in Weaver's suit against the validity of the recall election, and an investigation by the Michigan State Police as to whether the police department had illegally run a background check on Woodson.

Seventeen candidates in total filed to challenge Weaver. Under state law, the recall election occurred as a single-stage election, rather than a two-stage process in which an initial decision would be made on whether to recall Weaver, and a second one on who her replacement should be. City Councilman Scott Kincaid, who also sought re-election to his seat on the council, emerged as the leading candidate. However, Kincaid's eligibility to seek both offices was challenged, and Judge Neithercut ruled that Kincaid needed to choose between the offices. Kincaid opted to remain in the mayoral race. Another candidate, Don Pfeiffer, challenged Neithercut's order, arguing that Kincaid should have been struck from the ballot. After the election, which Kincaid lost, the Court of Appeals reversed Neithercut's decision, holding that Kincaid should have been struck from the ballot.

== Candidates ==
- Karen Weaver, incumbent Mayor
- Scott Kincaid, City Councilman
- Don Pfeiffer, building contractor
- Arthur Woodson, activist, recall organizer
- Anthony Palladeno Jr., retiree
- David Davenport, former member of the Flint Board of Education
- Angela Ward, entrepreneur
- Woody Etherly, former City Councilman
- Jeffrey L. Shelley, autoworker
- Sean MacIntyre, activist
- Chris Del Morone, retiree
- Brent Allan Jaworski, community steward
- Ronald D. Higgerson, businessman
- Ellery Johnson, lab technician
- Anderson L. Fernanders, counselor
- Al Wamsley, disabled veteran
- David W. Meier, retired autoworker
- Ray Hall, activist

== Results ==
2017 Flint mayoral recall election
Party	Candidate	Votes	%
Nonpartisan	Karen Weaver (inc.)	7,709	53.27%
Nonpartisan	Scott Kincaid	4,671	32.28%
Nonpartisan	Don Pfeiffer	894	6.18%
Nonpartisan	Arthur Woodson	352	2.43%
Nonpartisan	Anthony Palladeno, Jr.	167	1.15%
Nonpartisan	David Davenport	141	0.97%
Nonpartisan	Angela Ward	113	0.78%
Nonpartisan	Woody Etherly	95	0.66%
Nonpartisan	Jeffrey L. Shelley	50	0.35%
Nonpartisan	Sean MacIntyre	48	0.33%
Nonpartisan	Chris Del Morone	45	0.31%
Nonpartisan	Brent Allan Jaworski	29	0.20%
Nonpartisan	Ronald D. Higgerson	25	0.17%
Nonpartisan	Ellery Johnson	25	0.17%
Nonpartisan	Anderson L. Fernanders	18	0.12%
Nonpartisan	Al Wamsley	18	0.12%
Nonpartisan	David W. Meier	16	0.11%
Nonpartisan	Ray Hall	10	0.07%
Write-in		46	0.32%
Total votes		14,472	100.00%
