= Don Williamson =

American politician and businessman (1934–2019)

91st Mayor of Flint
- In office 2003 – February 15, 2009
- Preceded by: James W. Rutherford
- Succeeded by: Michael Brown (temporary)

Personal details
- Born: February 2, 1934 Flint, Michigan, U.S.
- Died: April 2, 2019 (aged 85)
- Party: Democratic
- Spouse: Patsy Lou Williamson

Donald J. Williamson (February 2, 1934 – April 2, 2019) was an American businessman and politician who served as the mayor of Flint, Michigan from 2003 to 2009. He was married to Patsy Lou Williamson, who owned several car dealerships in the Flint area. He was chairman of The Colonel's International, Inc., which manages two raceways.

== Background ==
Williamson was born and raised in Flint, Michigan. He married Patsy Lou, and together they managed a growing number of car dealerships.

In 1962, Williamson was convicted for several business scams. He served three years in prison before being paroled. He bought cars with bad checks and purchased other items without paying for them.

Williamson owned Brainerd International Raceway and Colonel's. He merged them into The Colonel's International, Inc. He sold Brainerd International Raceway to Jed & Kristi Copham in 2006.

== Political life ==
In 1999 Don Williamson challenged incumbent Mayor Woodrow Stanley and lost. After Stanley was recalled, Williamson was elected to his first full term in 2002, defeating former State Representative Floyd Clack. Williamson faced off against Flint Club founder and former president, Dayne Walling, in 2007, when he won reelection.

=== Election controversy ===
During his 2007 mayoral campaign, Williamson was accused of bribing citizens for votes by handing out more than $20,000 at the car dealership that his wife owns as part of a "Customer Appreciation Day." Each person who received money also was given his campaign literature.

During the 2007 campaign, Williamson claimed that the city had an $8.9 million surplus. But, after the mayoral elections, he revealed that the city had a $4 million deficit. Williamson had to fire 60 city employees: he proposed firing 60 police officers and 9 firefighters, and closing the city jail.

In both elections, Williamson, a Democrat, was opposed by the state Democratic party for a variety of reasons. They disapproved of him and his wife having made substantial campaign donations to the presidential campaigns of Republican George W. Bush. They contributed the maximum amount.

=== Administration ===
The Williamson administration had reported a balanced budget for fiscal year 2005, 2006 and delivered a balanced budget for fiscal year 2007. The City of Flint received a national budget award for 2006. After he replaced the Budget Director, and the city began a downward spiral of "emergency spending", leading to the city finishing the 2007-08 fiscal year with an $8.3 million deficit, and likely staring at another multimillion-dollar deficit in 2009. In March 2009, projections were for the deficit to exceed 14 million dollars.

Williamson appointed Darryl Buchanan, a city councilman, as the City Administrator after his second term election. At present, the city is in a $9 million deficit, much of it due to the various lawsuits against Don Williamson.

In February 2008, Williamson sued Flint city clerk Inez Brown for not convening a panel to investigate "her profane and threatening" language with an employee. During the Flint mayoral election, Williamson said that paving of hundreds of miles of roads was one of his proudest achievements as mayor.

Time magazine ranked Flint the "most dangerous city in America" in a 2007 issue. The 14th Annual CQ press publication of "Most Dangerous Cities in America" ranked Flint as third. Residents and officials disputed this study.

=== Recall campaign ===
In October 2008, petitions were submitted in the city clerk's office to recall Williamson as mayor. There were enough valid signatures to proceed. Williamson's legal challenges were unsuccessful, and a recall election was scheduled for February 24, 2009.

=== Resignation ===
Williamson began making major changes in department heads. He replaced the City Administrator, Darryl Buchanan, with Michael Brown, and appointed Buchanan to the nonexistent position of deputy mayor. On February 8, 2009, Williamson announced his resignation as mayor effective Saturday, February 14, stating health reasons.

Because he resigned, under Michigan law, the scheduled recall election was canceled. On February 16, 2009, city administrator Michael Brown succeeded as temporary mayor.

Williamson ran for governor of Michigan in 2010.

== Death ==
Williamson died on April 2, 2019, at the age of 85 due to complications from a respiratory illness.

Political offices
Preceded by James W. Rutherford	Mayor of Flint, Michigan; 2003–2009	Succeeded by Michael Brown, Temporary (City Administrator)
