= Sheldon Neeley =

American politician (born 1968)

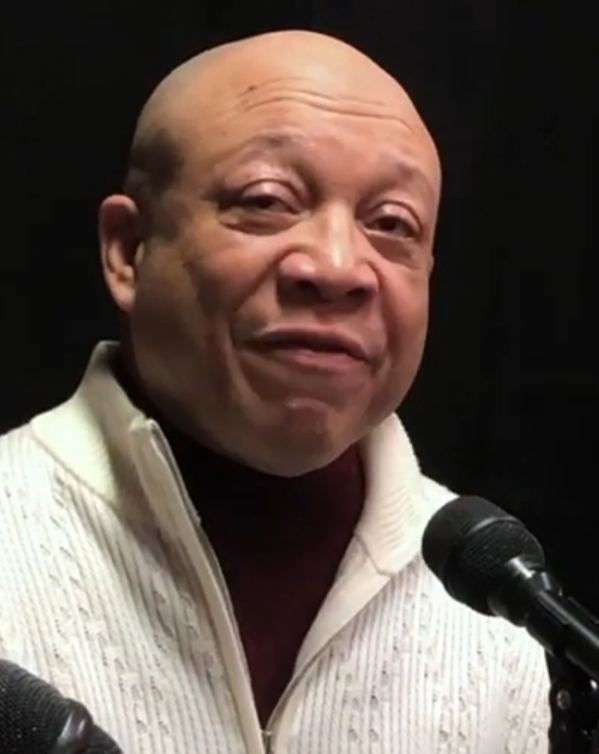
- Neeley in 2020

94th Mayor of Flint
- Incumbent
- Assumed office November 11, 2019
- Preceded by: Karen Weaver

Member of the Michigan House of Representatives from the 34th district
- In office January 1, 2015 – November 11, 2019
- Preceded by: Woodrow Stanley
- Succeeded by: Cynthia Neeley

Member of the Flint City Council from the 6th Ward
- In office 2005–2014
- Preceded by: Mark Horrigan
- Succeeded by: Herbert J. Winfrey

Personal details
- Born: September 20, 1968 (age 57) Flint, Michigan, U.S.
- Party: Democratic
- Spouse: Cynthia Neeley
- Children: 2
- Education: Delta College (AA); Saginaw Valley State University (attended)

Sheldon Andre Neeley (born September 20, 1968) is an American politician, currently serving as the Mayor of Flint, Michigan. He was elected as Flint's mayor in 2019 and served an abbreviated three-year term before being re-elected in 2022. Neeley is a registered Democrat and a former state representative in Michigan's 34th House district. He served two complete terms and one partial term in the Michigan House of Representatives between 2015 and 2019. He resigned from his position in the House when he was elected as the Mayor of Flint in 2019. Neeley's wife, Cynthia, was elected to his former seat on March 10, 2020. Neeley served two complete terms and one partial term on the Flint City Council between 2005 and 2014, prior to his tenure as Michigan Representative and was the Council's first African-American member to have come from Flint's Sixth Ward.

== Family, education, and early career ==
Neeley was born September 20, 1968, to parents Marva and Sam Neeley. He was born and raised in Flint, Michigan, graduating from Flint Northern High School in 1986.

Neeley obtained his associate degree from Delta College. He later attended Saginaw Valley State University, though he did not graduate. In October 2022, Neeley received backlash after Fox News Digital published an article revealing that multiple sources, including the Mayor of Flint page on the city's website, claimed he had received a bachelor's degree from Saginaw Valley State University. He later claimed this error was the fault of a political staffer.

Neeley worked as a broadcast technician for WJRT-TV12 for 27 years. He was the local union president of the National Association of Broadcast Employees and Technicians-Communication Workers of America until 2020. He also served as a work experience counselor for 10 years for the Flint Community Schools. For 4 years, he served as CEO of the Flint Inner City Junior Golf League, an organization founded by his father, Sam Neeley.

== Campaigns and elections ==
=== Flint City Council ===
Neeley first ran for Flint City Council in 2001, losing to incumbent Mark Horrigan in the city’s 6th Ward primary election.

In Neeley's second bid for Flint City Councilship in 2005, Horrigan chose not to run for re-election, instead opting to endorse Neeley. With Horrigan's retirement from the council, the 6th Ward was left without an incumbent councilman. Neeley won the 6th Ward’s August 2 primary election, allowing him to move on to the general election, where he faced challenger Nancy DeKatch. Neeley and DeKatch each refrained from issuing attacks against one another throughout their campaigns. Neeley received an endorsement from the Genesee County Democratic Black Caucus a few days prior to the Flint City Council’s November 8 general election. Neeley won election to the Flint City Council by a large margin, receiving nearly three times as many votes as DeKatch in the 6th Ward’s general election. Neeley was elected vice president of the Flint City Council by his peers soon after.

Neeley was re-elected vice president of the Flint City Council by his peers in November of both 2006 and 2007.

In 2009, Neeley ran for re-election to the Flint City Council. He won a plurality of votes cast in the 6th Ward’s August 4 primary election, advancing to face primary runner-up J.C. Walker in the general election. In October, Neeley was endorsed by both the Greater Flint AFL-CIO and the Flint Police Officers Association. Neeley won re-election to the Flint City Council in the 6th Ward’s general election on November 3.

Neeley ran for re-election to the Flint City Council again in 2013. He ran unopposed in Flint’s 6th Ward primary election. He also ran unopposed in the general election and was re-elected to the Flint City Council on November 5.

=== Michigan House of Representatives ===
In 2014, Neeley ran for election in Michigan’s 34th House of Representatives district. In the Democratic primary, Neeley ran against seven other Democrats, including future Flint mayoral race opponent and then-councilman Eric Mays. At a candidate forum in June 2014, Neeley expressed his support for marriage equality and local law enforcement. In MLive’s 2014 voter questionnaire, Neeley voiced his opposition to Michigan’s implementation of emergency managers and listed job creation, education, and public safety as top priority issues. Neeley also suggested that elected officials in Flint be subject to drug tests.

On August 5, Neeley won the 34th district Democratic primary with a plurality of votes. He received 2,966 votes, while runner-up Omar Sims received 1,888. In the Michigan House of Representatives 34th district general election, Neeley faced Republican Bruce Rogers, who ran unopposed in the district’s Republican primary. Neeley received more than 90% of votes cast in the general election and was elected to the Michigan House of Representatives on November 2.

In 2016, Neeley ran for re-election to the Michigan House of Representatives in the state’s 34th district. He went unopposed in the Democratic primary. In the 2016 edition of The Flint Journal’s Voter Guide, Neeley voiced his support for tuition freezing as a temporary solution to rising tuition costs and listed infrastructure repair, environmental safety, law enforcement and economic growth as top priority issues. Neeley beat Republican challenger Page Brousseau in the November 8th general election, receiving nearly 90% of the vote.

Neeley ran for re-election to the Michigan House of Representatives again in 2018. Neeley beat opponents Steven Greene and Syrron Williams in the August 7th Democratic primary with nearly 90% of votes cast in the 34th district. He went on to win the district’s general election, beating Republican Henry Swift with 90% of the vote on November 6.

=== Flint Mayor ===
Neeley ran for Flint Mayor in 2007. When questioned by The Flint Journal, Neeley identified public safety and economic development as key issues in the 2007 mayoral race. On August 2, Neeley received endorsements from both Sisters United and the Afro-American Police League. Neeley was eliminated in Flint's nonpartisan primary election. In October, after then-mayor and candidate for re-election Don Williamson used a photo which featured Neeley in campaign material, the councilman threatened to sue Williamson. Williamson won re-election as Flint's mayor in November.

Neeley ran for Flint Mayor again in 2009. Neeley stressed the importance of economic development during his campaign. He was eliminated in Flint's nonpartisan primary election.

Neeley announced his candidacy for Flint Mayor in April 2019. In the city’s August 6 nonpartisan primary election, Neeley faced Greg Eason, Don Pfeiffer, and incumbent Karen Weaver. Neeley and Weaver advanced to Flint's general mayoral election after receiving 3,586 votes and 3,815 votes, respectively. Over the course of the 2019 election cycle, Neeley raised $23,465 while Weaver raised $299,738. After a number of Flint residents alleged ballot mishandling, Neeley personally requested that the State of Michigan oversee Flint's mayoral election. Neeley's request was denied. In the November 5th general election, Neeley won 7,082 votes to Weaver’s 6,877, and Neeley was elected as Flint's mayor.

On February 2, 2022, the Flint Journal published an article stating that Neeley had disclosed his intention to run for re-election as Flint's mayor to the paper on January 31. On May 28, 2022, Governor Whitmer announced her endorsement of Neeley for Mayor of Flint. Neeley received 4,943 votes (48.8% of those cast) in Flint's nonpartisan primary election held on August 2. Former Flint Mayor Karen Weaver was runner-up in the 2022 primary, receiving 4,062 votes (40.1%). In the Flint mayoral general election on November 8, Neeley netted 11,692 votes, winning a second term as Flint's mayor. Weaver garnered 10,411 votes. Neeley's re-election campaign spending reached a total of $166,000.

== Policies ==
=== Law enforcement ===
Given Flint's strong mayoral powers, the mayor has the ability to appoint government officials, including police and fire chiefs. In November 2019 when Neeley was elected, he appointed Phil Hart as the interim police chief, who was standing in while Neeley found the right officer to fill the important position permanently. In Hart's time as police chief, he had the job of addressing Flint's rising gun violence in a way that would set up for the incoming permanent police chief. Neeley and Hart worked together to end the gun buyback program, recruiting new officers, and increasing neighborhood patrol. In September 2020, Terrance Green took over as the permanent Flint police chief. He previously served in the neighboring town of Mt. Morris as police chief, as well as commander for the drug unit of Genesee County.

=== Public safety ===
Compared to 2019 when Neeley took office, there was a 30% increase in homicides, ranking Flint the tenth highest city for violent crimes in 2020. In the light of rising homicides and shootings, Neeley asked for emergency state and federal assistance initially in July 2021, but pushed to extend the emergency help indefinitely to try to curb the street violence. Through several executive orders, the Flint Police Department partnered with community mental health professionals to offer trauma counseling and community outreach programs to help the Flint community through this violence.

In continued efforts to curb the rise of Flint gun violence, Neeley ended the gun buyback program, a program that auctions off confiscated guns back to the public, these funds then go to supporting the Flint police department. Neeley believed ending this program was an essential step towards limiting the guns that return to the streets. The Flint police department now destroyed of all guns that were collected through police work after Neeley's order, which urges that keeping guns out of neighborhoods is more important than the department funding. Neeley states he is not anti-guns but rather is against guns becoming a street currency in Flint.

=== COVID-19 response ===
The City of Flint began their COVID response on Tuesday, March 17, 2020, by closing City Hall. Flint was the second city in Michigan to acknowledge the pandemic as a state of emergency. However, Neeley did not implement a stay-at-home order, instead asking residents to voluntarily limit their social meetings. Flint is the only city in its area to employ a medical advisor to guide them through the pandemic. The city also implemented a program to provide water bill relief to residents during the pandemic, and was the only city in Michigan to do so.

=== Flint water crisis response ===
As of 2019, when Neeley was elected, the Flint water crisis was still an issue in the city. The city was still working on changing its water pipes from lead as well as building a water treatment plant. The Water Infrastructure Improvements for the Nation Act provided $100 million to fund these expenditures. As of July 2016, before Neeley took office, the lead in Flint’s water had been within state levels.

== Political endorsements ==
On March 8, 2020, Neeley announced his endorsement of Joe Biden in the 2020 United States presidential election.

== Electoral history ==
=== Flint City Council ===
2009 General Election for Flint City Council, 6th Ward
Candidate	Votes	%
Sheldon Neeley	855	66.13
J. C. Walker	436	33.72
Total votes	1,291	99.85
