= Dayne Walling =

American politician

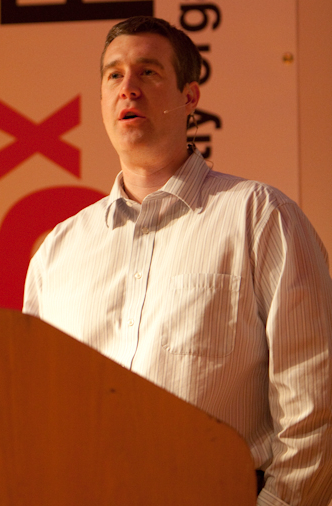

92nd Mayor of Flint
- In office August 6, 2009 – November 3, 2015
- Preceded by: Michael Brown (acting)
- Succeeded by: Karen Weaver

Karegnondi Water Authority Board of Trustees Chair
- In office October 26, 2010 – November 25, 2015
- Deputy: Gregory L. Alexander
- Succeeded by: Gregory L. Alexander

Personal details
- Born: March 3, 1974 (age 52)
- Party: Democratic
- Children: Bennett, Emery
- Education: Michigan State University; University of Oxford; Goldsmiths, University of London; University of Minnesota

Dayne Walling (born March 3, 1974) is an American politician who was the mayor of Flint, Michigan from 2009 to 2015. Although the Flint mayor's office is a nonpartisan position, Walling is a member of the Democratic Party.

== Early life and education ==
Walling was born on March 3, 1974 to two educators of Flint schools. In 1992, he graduated from Flint Central High School.

Walling then earned a bachelor's degree in social relations from Michigan State University. He attended the University of Oxford on a Rhodes Scholarship getting a bachelor's in modern history. He followed that with a master's degree in urban affairs from Goldsmiths, University of London.

== Career ==
Walling began his public service career in the mayor's office in Washington, DC. For over two years, he worked as manager of research and communication. During that time, Walling was a founder and president of the Flint Club, a 501(c)(3) non-profit community organization. Walling had also served as U.S. Rep. Dale E. Kildee's Field coordinator and worked to get out the vote for National Voice.

He then became a policy advocate for Urban Coalition of Minnesota and was a doctoral candidate at University of Minnesota. After an April 2004 Flint forum, Walling decided to move back to Flint to run for mayor. In May 2006, Walling and his family moved to Kensington Avenue in Flint. He worked for one year as a senior research fellow at the Genesee County Land Bank.

=== Political career ===
In the 2007 primary, Walling was one of seven candidates for mayor. Walling made it to the general election along with Don Williamson. Walling received support by the Michigan Democratic Party but lost to Williamson. On August 4, 2009, Walling won the special general mayoral election over Genesee County Commissioner Brenda Clack to replace Williamson after his resignation.

One of Mayor Walling's appointments came under scrutiny by the public and city council, after he appointed Donna Poplar as human resource director. Poplar was fired from her job as Genesee County Community Action Agency Director in 1999 and convicted of a felony which was later expunged.

David Davenport, a school board member, filed recall language with the county election commission, which approve the language that named cutting fire and police protection as reasons for the recalled. In the third quarter 2010, recall petitions were turned in by the Committee to Recall Dayne Walling were rejected for signature issues. The committee attempted to have those signature reinstated by the courts.

On October 26, 2010, the Karegnondi Water Authority Board of Trustees met for the first time with representatives from the incorporating counties and cities. Walling was elected chair.

In his bid to be re-elected, Walling came in first in the nonpartisan general primary on August 2, 2011 with Darryl Buchanan taking second to face off with him in the general election in November. On November 8, 2011, Walling defeated Buchanan 8,819 votes (56%) to 6,868 votes (44%).

On the date of his re-election, the Michigan State review panel declared the City of Flint to be in state of a "local government financial emergency". His authority as the mayor of Flint was superseded by the appointment of Michael Brown as the city's emergency manager by Rick Snyder, the governor of Michigan, on November 29 but effective December 1. After a series of emergency manager on April 30, 2015, the state moved the city from under from an emergency manager receivership to a Receivership Transition Advisory Board. On July 1, 2014, Walling as mayor was given operating authority over two city departments, Planning and Development and Public Works, by Flint emergency manager Darnell Earley.

During his first campaign for mayor, Walling promised to spearhead a new master plan for the city of Flint. The plan then in place was over 50 years old. In October 2013, the citizens of Flint adopted the first new master plan since 1960. Over 5,000 Flint residents took part in the process to craft a road map for Flint's future. The Imagine Flint Master Plan now serves as a guide for City operations and a blueprint for new developments. The plan was the first master plan of the city since 1960.

Walling served as the chair of the national Manufacturing Alliance of Communities from 2013 through 2015. As chair, he championed Flint's role in the transformation of the U.S. manufacturing industry. Walling also led the Maker Mayors effort which led to the first-ever Maker Faire at the White House with President Obama.

In late 2014, Walling became an instructor at the University of Michigan-Flint for its fall semester teaching POL 324: Seminar in Applied Politics – Institutional & Leadership Practices.

=== Flint water crisis ===
In 2014, the City of Flint began undertaking a water supply switch-over from Lake Huron to the Flint River. After the switch was made, residents immediately complained about the smell, taste, and color of the water, as well as skin problems after bathing. State and city officials reassured the public that Flint's water was safe, with Mayor Walling personally testifying to its safety by drinking the water on local television and tweeting that he and his family drink Flint water every day.

In early September 2015, Walling requested an additional $10 million from the government of Michigan to replace water service lines with lead or lead solder and for the city to step up development of a corrosion control plan to be finished by the end of the year. After meeting with Mona Hanna-Attisha, the lead doctor of the Hurley Hospital Lead Study, Walling issued an advisory on lead while the state still had issue with the study. Doctors recommended ending the use of the Flint river as a water supply, but were told in a meeting with Walling and other city officials that such a move would bankrupt the city.

The water crisis was at the center of the November 2015 election. Walling ultimately lost his re-election bid to Karen Weaver.

=== Later career ===
On Monday, January 29, 2018, Walling declared that he was a candidate for the 49th district seat of the Michigan House of Representatives after the incumbent, Phil Phelps, was term limited. He received the second most votes and was defeated in the Democratic primary by John Daniel Cherry on August 7, 2018.

Political offices
| Preceded by Michael Brown; Temporary | Mayor of Flint; 2009–2015 | Succeeded by Karen Weaver |
| Preceded by None | Karegnondi Water Authority; Board of Trustees Chair; 2010–2015 | Succeeded by Gregory L. Alexander |
