= Karen Weaver =

American politician (born 1959)

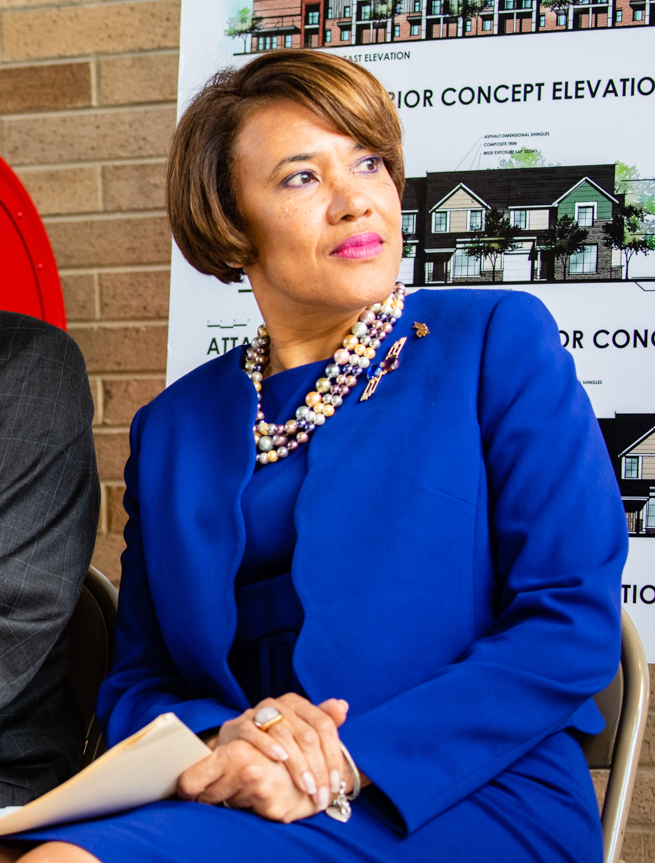

93rd Mayor of Flint
- In office November 9, 2015 – November 11, 2019
- Preceded by: Dayne Walling
- Succeeded by: Sheldon Neeley

Personal details
- Born: Karen Williams; 1959 (age 65–66) Flint, Michigan, U.S.
- Political party: Democratic
- Spouse: Wrex Weaver
- Children: 3
- Education: Tougaloo College (BA); Long Island University (MA); Michigan State University (PsyD)

Karen Weaver (née Williams; born 1959) is an American psychologist and politician who was the mayor of Flint, Michigan, from 2015 to 2019. She was the first female mayor of the city and the fifth African-American to hold the office.

Weaver is a member of the Democratic Party, although local offices in Flint are officially nonpartisan. She is also a member of the Michigan Economic Development Corporation, and Governor Rick Snyder's Flint Water Interagency Coordinating Committee.

During her tenure as mayor, Weaver twice visited the White House and met U.S. Presidents Barack Obama and Donald Trump. She oversaw the city's role in the recovery from the ongoing Flint water crisis, the most dominant issue during her mayoral tenure.

Her term ended on November 11, 2019. She was defeated in her re-election by Sheldon Neeley the previous week.

== Early life and education ==
The youngest of three children, Weaver was born in Flint and grew up on the city's north side. She graduated from Flint Northern High School in 1977. She holds a bachelor's degree from Tougaloo College, a master's degree from Long Island University, and a doctorate in clinical psychology from Michigan State University.

== Career ==
Prior to being elected mayor of Flint in 2015, Weaver served on a number of committees in the city, including the Hurley Medical Center Board of Managers, Priority Children and the Community Foundation of Greater Flint.

In the mayoral election of November 3, 2015, Weaver received 7,825 votes (55%), defeating Mayor Dayne Walling, who received 6,061 votes (45%). Weaver took office on November 9, 2015.

Shortly after taking office, she declared an emergency in the city due to the water crisis in the area. She also pushed for a similar declaration by state and federal authorities, which were granted by Michigan Governor Rick Snyder on January 5, and President Barack Obama on January 16, 2016. According to Weaver, this declaration means that the federal government will now be responsible for disaster relief efforts, rather than the state of Michigan, as had been the case before. On January 19, 2016, Mayor Weaver visited the White House and met President Obama. On February 10, 2016, Weaver testified before the U.S. House Democratic Steering and Policy Committee on the water crisis.

On February 12, 2016, she fired Flint Police Chief James Tolbert, Fire Chief David Cox, and City Administrator Natasha Henderson. Tolbert said her explanation was, "she wants to make some changes." The city council and state Receivership Transition Advisory Board approved her appointments for their successors (Tim Johnson as police chief and Raymond Barton as fire chief) later that month. On May 9, 2016, Henderson filed a lawsuit in federal court, claiming she was fired from her position as city administrator after reporting Mayor Weaver may have been telling staff to direct water crisis donations to her own personal funds. Two days later, the city hired an attorney to investigate the claim. Weaver said Henderson's claims were "outrageously false." The case was dismissed on August 8, 2017.

On March 24, 2016, Governor Snyder appointed Weaver to an eight-year term on the Michigan Economic Development Corporation's executive committee. Mayor Weaver was also appointed to Governor Snyder's Flint Water Interagency Coordinating Committee which is attempting to alleviate the problems caused during the Flint water crisis.

Mayor Weaver endorsed Hillary Clinton in the 2016 presidential election and briefly spoke about the water crisis at that year's Democratic National Convention in Philadelphia.

On March 15, 2017, Mayor Weaver met President Donald Trump to discuss funding for infrastructure and public safety for Flint and met with officials at the White House for further discussion of Flint's water infrastructure later that year.

Mayor Weaver survived a recall election on November 7, 2017, with 53% of voters supporting her to stay in office. Of the other 17 mayoral contenders, Ninth Ward Flint City Councilman Scott Kincaid came in second place with about 32% of the vote.

In November 2019, Weaver lost her bid for reelection to Sheldon Neeley, a member of the Michigan House of Representatives. Weaver ran against incumbent mayor Neeley in November 2022, after having gained second place in the August 2 primary. Neely was re-elected.

Political offices
Preceded by Dayne Walling	Mayor of Flint; 2015–2019	Succeeded by Sheldon Neeley
