= National Register of Historic Places listings in Genesee County, Michigan =

The following is a list of Registered Historic Places in Genesee County, Michigan.

This National Park Service list is complete through NPS recent listings posted May 1, 2026.

	Name on the Register	Image	Date listed	Location	City or town	Description
1	Robert P. Aitken Farm House	Robert P. Aitken Farm House	November 26, 1982 (#82000496)	1110 N. Linden Rd. 43°01′10″N 83°46′21″W	Flint Township	Italianate/Greek Revival style farmhouse. Built circa 1843 by Michigan State Congressman Robert P. Aitken (1819–1873) and later owned by his son U.S. Congressman David D. Aitken (1853–1930). Still a private residence.
2	Applewood	Applewood	April 16, 1979 (#79001152)	1400 E. Kearsley St. 43°01′26″N 83°40′24″W	Flint	Estate of Charles Stewart Mott (1875–1973)
3	Atlas Grange Hall	Atlas Grange Hall	November 26, 1982 (#82000497)	8530 Perry Rd. 42°56′16″N 83°32′05″W	Atlas	
4	Benjamin Bangs House	Benjamin Bangs House	November 26, 1982 (#82000498)	819 S. Leroy St. 42°47′21″N 83°42′17″W	Fenton	
5	Barn at 4277 Irish Road	Barn at 4277 Irish Road	November 26, 1982 (#82000499)	4277 Irish Rd. 42°58′05″N 83°33′13″W	Davison	
6	Beach-Garland Street-Flint River Bridge	Beach-Garland Street-Flint River Bridge	December 9, 1999 (#99001513)	Beach and Garland Sts. over Flint R. 43°01′11″N 83°41′39″W	Flint	Luten arch bridge. It has been destroyed and replaced.
7	Berridge Hotel	Berridge Hotel	March 27, 2008 (#08000219)	421 Garland St. 43°01′10″N 83°41′44″W	Flint	
8	Bird/Boyd Farm House	Bird/Boyd Farm House	November 26, 1982 (#82000500)	14215 Bird Rd. 42°49′10″N 83°52′30″W	Byron	
9	Frank D. Bloss and Sons Farm House	Frank D. Bloss and Sons Farm House	November 26, 1982 (#82000501)	8380 Reid Rd. 42°55′39″N 83°50′44″W	Swartz Creek	
10	Bridge Street-Broad Street Historic District	Bridge Street-Broad Street Historic District	November 26, 1982 (#82000502)	3 Central blocks of Broad St., 2 blocks Bridge St. 42°48′53″N 83°46′53″W	Linden	
11	Jesse H. Buck Farm House	Jesse H. Buck Farm House	November 26, 1982 (#82000503)	6095 Baldwin Rd. 42°53′02″N 83°47′33″W	Swartz Creek	
12	Capitol Theatre Building	Capitol Theatre Building	January 31, 1985 (#85000165)	140 E. 2nd St. 43°00′55″N 83°41′20″W	Flint	
13	William Carmer House	William Carmer House	November 26, 1982 (#82000504)	10448 Washburn Rd. 42°52′42″N 83°27′17″W	Ortonville	
14	Volney Church-Carlos B. Shotwell House	Volney Church-Carlos B. Shotwell House	November 26, 1982 (#82000505)	812 S. Adelaide St. 42°47′20″N 83°42′26″W	Fenton	
15	City of Flint Municipal Center	City of Flint Municipal Center	December 19, 2019 (#100004775)	1101 Saginaw St., 210 East Fifth St., 310 East Fifth St. 43°00′42″N 83°41′11″W	Flint	
16	Civic Park Historic District	Civic Park Historic District	September 7, 1979 (#79001153)	Roughly bounded by Welch and Brownell Blvds., Trumbull Ave., Dupont and Dartmouth Sts. 43°02′15″N 83°43′11″W	Flint	
17	Clio Depot	Clio Depot	June 20, 1983 (#83000842)	300-308 W. Vienna Rd. 43°10′39″N 83°44′15″W	Clio	Now a museum
18	David B. Colwell House	David B. Colwell House	November 26, 1982 (#82000506)	901 S. Leroy St. 42°47′16″N 83°42′17″W	Fenton	
19	Calvin Coolidge Elementary School		February 1, 2018 (#100002067)	3701 Van Buren Ave. 43°00′35″N 83°43′58″W	Flint	
20	Dibbleville-Fentonville Historic District	Dibbleville-Fentonville Historic District	November 26, 1982 (#82000507)	Roughly bounded by Shiawassee, Riggs, Holly and George Sts. 42°47′31″N 83°42′20″W	Fenton	
21	Durant-Dort Carriage Company Office	Durant-Dort Carriage Company Office	September 2, 1975 (#75000943)	316 W. Water St. 43°01′02″N 83°41′46″W	Flint	Office building of General Motors founder William C. Durant and his business partner Josiah Dallas Dort.
22	Elks Lodge Building	Elks Lodge Building	October 4, 1978 (#78001497)	142 W. 2nd St. 43°00′53″N 83°41′28″W	Flint	
23	Fenton Railroad Depot	Fenton Railroad Depot	June 20, 1983 (#83000843)	207 Silver Lake Rd. 42°47′50″N 83°42′09″W	Fenton	Now an office building
24	First Baptist Church of Grand Blanc	First Baptist Church of Grand Blanc	June 20, 1983 (#83000844)	6101 S. Saginaw St. 42°56′32″N 83°38′53″W	Grand Blanc	
25	First National Bank and Trust Company Building	First National Bank and Trust Company Building	June 27, 2007 (#07000646)	460 South Saginaw St. 43°00′57″N 83°41′28″W	Flint	
26	Flint Journal Building	Flint Journal Building	December 11, 2013 (#13000903)	200 E. 1st St. 43°00′59″N 83°41′20″W	Flint	Now used by the Michigan State University College of Human Medicine.
27	Genesee Avenue – Walker Street Historic District	Genesee Avenue – Walker Street Historic District	June 20, 1983 (#83000845)	Roughly bounded by Washington, Elm, Lord Sts., and railroad Tracks; 42°52′21″N 83°54′48″W	Gaines	
28	Genesee County Courthouse	Genesee County Courthouse	May 24, 1990 (#90000798)	920 S. Saginaw St. 43°00′42″N 83°41′17″W	Flint	
29	Genesee County Savings Bank	Genesee County Savings Bank	November 27, 2017 (#100001836)	352 S. Saginaw St. 43°01′01″N 83°41′32″W	Flint	
30	Horace Gilbert/Morgan and Enos Miller House	Horace Gilbert/Morgan and Enos Miller House	November 26, 1982 (#82000509)	5023 Holland Dr. 42°57′23″N 83°49′54″W	Swartz Creek	
31	Glenwood Cemetery	Glenwood Cemetery	September 22, 2010 (#10000616)	2500 W Court St. 43°00′25″N 83°43′17″W	Flint	
32	Alanson Green Farm House	Alanson Green Farm House	November 26, 1982 (#82000510)	11226 Green Rd. 42°54′15″N 83°29′07″W	Goodrich	
33	Hegel Road Historic District	Hegel Road Historic District	November 26, 1982 (#82000511)	Hegel Rd. between Seneca and the Goodrich Millpond; 42°55′00″N 83°30′18″W	Goodrich	
34	Col. J. Hinckley House	Col. J. Hinckley House	November 26, 1982 (#82000512)	210 High St. 42°47′16″N 83°42′11″W	Fenton	
35	Hotel Durant	Hotel Durant	March 17, 2009 (#09000128)	607 East 2nd Avenue; 43°01′13″N 83°41′39″W	Flint	Sat vacant for decades, it was recently renovated and is now an apartment building.
36	House at 10410 Stanley Road	House at 10410 Stanley Road	November 26, 1982 (#82000514)	10410 Stanley Rd. 43°06′13″N 83°53′18″W	Flushing	
37	House at 1339 Cummings Road	House at 1339 Cummings Road	November 26, 1982 (#82000515)	1339 Cummings Rd. 43°01′47″N 83°29′20″W	Davison	
38	House at 4305 South Linden Road	House at 4305 South Linden Road	November 26, 1982 (#82000516)	4305 S. Linden Rd. 42°57′52″N 83°46′16″W	Flint	
39	House at 4344 Frances Road	House at 4344 Frances Road	November 26, 1982 (#82000517)	4344 W. Frances Rd. 43°08′03″N 83°46′02″W	Clio	
40	House at 5556 Flushing Road	House at 5556 Flushing Road	November 26, 1982 (#82000518)	5556 Flushing Rd. 43°02′39″N 83°47′25″W	Flushing	
41	House at 6112 Carpenter Road	House at 6112 Carpenter Road	November 26, 1982 (#82000513)	6112 Carpenter Rd. 43°05′03″N 83°35′34″W	Flint	
42	House at 7066 Lobdell Road	House at 7066 Lobdell Road	November 26, 1982 (#82000519)	7066 Lobdell Rd. 42°47′29″N 83°48′28″W	Linden	
43	Industrial Savings Bank Building	Industrial Savings Bank Building	April 19, 1984 (#84001393)	432 N. Saginaw St. 43°01′12″N 83°41′35″W	Flint	Now the Northbank Center, part of the University of Michigan–Flint
44	H. N. Jennings House	H. N. Jennings House	November 26, 1982 (#82000520)	800 S. East St. 42°47′16″N 83°42′07″W	Fenton	
45	Abner C. Johnson House	Abner C. Johnson House	February 19, 1987 (#87000183)	625 East St. 43°01′02″N 83°40′58″W	Flint	
46	Morris A. Knight House	Morris A. Knight House	July 29, 1982 (#82004680)	1105 Church St. 43°00′33″N 83°41′17″W	Flint	
47	Linden Mill	Linden Mill	August 21, 1972 (#72000615)	Tickner St. 42°48′55″N 83°46′54″W	Linden	
48	Main Street Historic District	Main Street Historic District	June 20, 1983 (#83000846)	Main St. from Maple to 628 Main St. 43°03′47″N 83°51′01″W	Flushing	
49	Marian Hall	Marian Hall	April 7, 2025 (#100011635)	529 Martin Luther King Ave; 43°01′15″N 83°41′42″W	Flint	
50	Mauk & Hammer/Houghton Elevator	Mauk & Hammer/Houghton Elevator	November 26, 1982 (#82000521)	315 W. Vienna St. 43°10′37″N 83°44′16″W	Clio	
51	John McAra House	John McAra House	November 26, 1982 (#82000522)	2157 Irish Rd. 43°00′03″N 83°33′17″W	Davison	
52	William Henry and Lucinda McCaslin Farm House	William Henry and Lucinda McCaslin Farm House	November 26, 1982 (#82000523)	15237 McCaslin Lake Rd. 42°48′25″N 83°51′18″W	Linden	
53	Alexander McClew Farm House	Alexander McClew Farm House	November 26, 1982 (#82000524)	7115 Farrand Rd. 43°11′41″N 83°34′35″W	Millington	
54	Isaac R. Middlesworth Farm House	Isaac R. Middlesworth Farm House	November 26, 1982 (#82000525)	11355 Rolston Rd. 42°49′29″N 83°53′58″W	Byron	
55	James H. Murray House	James H. Murray House	November 26, 1982 (#82000526)	7232 Silver Lake Rd. 42°48′39″N 83°48′52″W	Linden	
56	Daniel O'Sullivan House/Halfway House	Daniel O'Sullivan House/Halfway House	November 26, 1982 (#82000527)	5035 Flushing Rd. 43°02′21″N 83°46′29″W	Flushing	
57	Parker and Dunstan Hardware/Dr. E. D. Lewis Building	Parker and Dunstan Hardware/Dr. E. D. Lewis Building	November 26, 1982 (#82000528)	129–133 W. Main St. 43°09′57″N 83°31′31″W	Otisville	
58	William A. Paterson Factory Complex	William A. Paterson Factory Complex	February 16, 1984 (#84001396)	126 E. 3rd St. 43°00′51″N 83°41′17″W	Flint	
59	Superintendent's Cottage	Superintendent's Cottage	July 7, 1975 (#75000944)	Michigan School for the Deaf campus 43°00′20″N 83°42′08″W	Flint	
60	Swayze Apartments	Swayze Apartments	July 10, 2015 (#15000363)	313 W. Court St. 43°00′39″N 83°41′27″W	Flint	
61	E. S. Swayze Drugstore/Otisville Mason Lodge No. 401	E. S. Swayze Drugstore/Otisville Mason Lodge No. 401	November 26, 1982 (#82000529)	106 E. Main St. 43°10′00″N 83°31′27″W	Otisville	Now a Subway restaurant
62	H. Elmer Thayer House	H. Elmer Thayer House	November 26, 1982 (#82000530)	G-3202 Court St. 43°00′27″N 83°44′28″W	Flint	
63	Harry C. Tinker House	Harry C. Tinker House	November 26, 1982 (#82000531)	12030 N. Lewis Rd. 43°10′46″N 83°40′46″W	Clio	
64	Tinlinn Apartments	Tinlinn Apartments	March 27, 2008 (#08000220)	413 Garland St. 43°01′09″N 83°41′43″W	Flint	
65	Edwin Trump House	Edwin Trump House	November 26, 1982 (#82000532)	801 S. East St. 42°47′16″N 83°42′04″W	Fenton	
66	United States Post Office	United States Post Office	May 22, 2013 (#13000321)	600 Church St. 43°00′48″N 83°41′32″W	Flint	Now a federal courthouse
67	John Van Buskirk Farm House	John Van Buskirk Farm House	June 20, 1983 (#83000847)	7348 Coldwater Rd. 43°05′29″N 83°33′53″W	Davison	
68	Vermont House and Fenton Grain Elevator	Vermont House and Fenton Grain Elevator	May 15, 1980 (#80001853)	302 and 234 N. Leroy St. 42°47′54″N 83°42′17″W	Fenton	
69	West Second Street-Swartz Creek Bridge	West Second Street-Swartz Creek Bridge	December 9, 1999 (#99001512)	West Second St. over Swartz Creek; 43°00′38″N 83°41′58″W	Flint	
70	West Vienna United Methodist Church	West Vienna United Methodist Church	June 20, 1983 (#83000848)	5485 Wilson Rd. 43°09′45″N 83°47′30″W	Clio	The historic church appears to have been demolished.
71	Robert J. Whaley House	Robert J. Whaley House	May 15, 1980 (#80001855)	624 E. Kearsley St. 43°01′12″N 83°41′02″W	Flint	Now a museum

== Former listings ==
	Name on the Register	Image	Date listed	Date removed	Location	City or town	Description
1	Fenton Downtown Historic District	Fenton Downtown Historic District	September 26, 1974 (#74002339)	October 20, 1975	Bounded by Silver Lake Rd., Ellen, Walnut and River Sts. 42°47′47″N 83°42′18″W	Fenton	Demolished.
2	Fenton Seminary	Fenton Seminary	November 26, 1982 (#82000508)	July 1, 2020	309 High St. 42°47′16″N 83°42′34″W	Fenton	This building was demolished in 2015.
3	Flint Brewing Company	Flint Brewing Company	April 10, 1980 (#80001854)	July 1, 2020	2001 S. Saginaw St. 43°00′14″N 83°40′39″W	Flint	Demolished in 1992.
4	Industrial Mutual Association Auditorium	Industrial Mutual Association Auditorium	July 28, 1983 (#83000849)	November 12, 1997	815 E Second Ave. 43°01′12″N 83°41′31″W	Flint	Imploded on February 24, 1997.

== See also ==
- List of Michigan State Historic Sites in Genesee County, Michigan
- National Register of Historic Places listings in Michigan
- Listings in neighboring counties: Lapeer, Livingston, Oakland, Saginaw, Shiawassee, Tuscola
