= Beach-Garland Street-Flint River Bridge =

- Beach–Garland Street–Flint River Bridge
- U.S. National Register of Historic Places
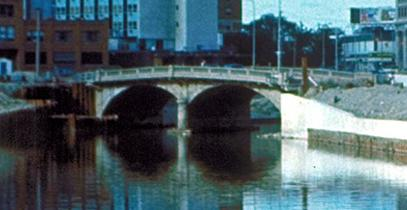
- Bridge, in c.1979

- Location within Michigan Location within the United States
- Interactive map
- Location: Beach and Garland streets over Flint River, Flint, Michigan
- Coordinates: 43°01′11″N 83°41′39″W
- Area: less than one acre
- Built: 1920
- Built by: Illinois Bridge Company
- Architect: Flint City Engineer's Office, Daniel B. Luten
- Architectural style: Luten arch bridge
- Demolished: 2006
- MPS: Highway Bridges of Michigan MPS
- NRHP reference No.: 99001513
- Added to NRHP: December 9, 1999

The Beach–Garland Street–Flint River Bridge was a historic Luten arch bridge carrying Beach and Garland streets over the Flint River in Flint, Michigan. It was listed on the National Register of Historic Places in 1999. The bridge served from 1921 until 2006.

== History ==
In 1920, there were only two major bridges crossing the river in the city of Flint. Due to its recent growth, this was inadequate for the transportation needs of the city. To help ease the congestion, the city instructed City Engineer Ezra Shoecraft to develop plans for a new bridge, crossing the river to connect Garland Street on the north and Beach Street on the south. Shoecraft commissioned Indianapolis bridge designer Daniel B. Luten, who had earlier designed other Flint bridges (including the still extant West Second Street–Swartz Creek Bridge), to create a design for the new bridge. Luten delineated several options, and the city chose among them. The city awarded the contract to build the new bridge to the Illinois Bridge Company of Chicago, who had been the contractor for the city's previous Luten arch bridges. Work on the new bridge began in October 1920, and was completed in the fall of 1921.

By 2006, the bridge had deteriorated, with concrete spalling on the arches and sidewalks. In the middle of the year, the bridge was demolished and replaced.

== Description ==
The Beach–Garland Street Bridge was a two-span Luten arch concrete bridge, constructed from two heavily skewed filled spandrel arches spanning 80 feet. The arches were supported by massive concrete abutments on each bank and a central pier with bullnosed cutwaters. The arches were elliptically shaped with tapered arch rings marked with incised lines in the concrete. The arches supported an asphalt-surfaced roadway, flanked on both sides by concrete sidewalks which were cantilevered over the arch supports. Running external to the sidewalks were concrete guardrails with classical, cast-concrete balusters.

== Replacement ==
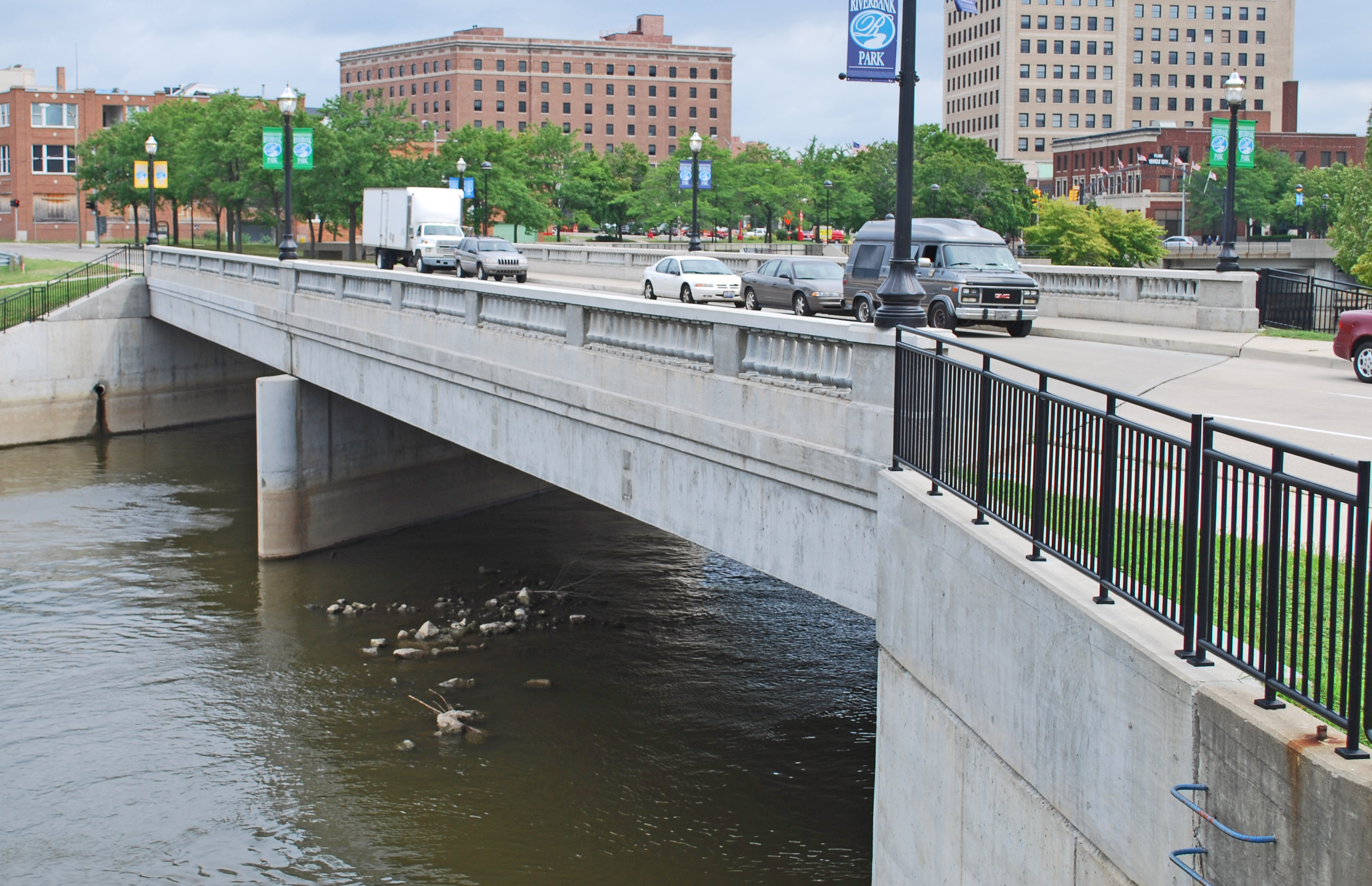
Replacement bridge, 2010

The bridge was demolished and replaced in 2006.
