= Isaac R. Middlesworth Farm House =

- U.S. National Register of Historic Places
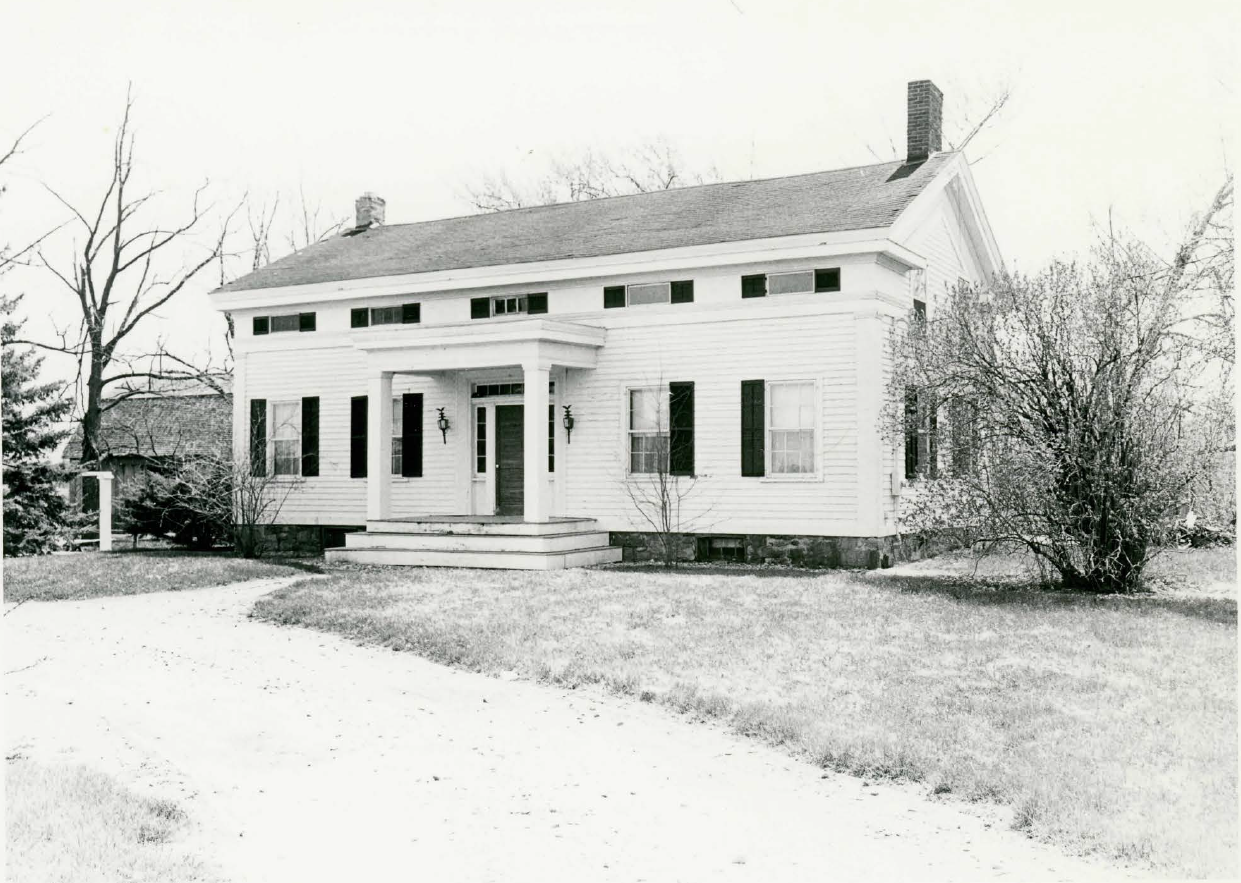
- Interactive map
- Location: 11355 Rolston Rd., Byron, Michigan
- Coordinates: 42°49′29″N 83°53′58″W
- Area: less than one acre
- Architectural style: Greek Revival
- MPS: Genesee County MRA
- NRHP reference No.: 82000525
- Added to NRHP: November 26, 1982

The Isaac R. Middlesworth Farm House is a single-family home located at 11355 Rolston Road in Byron, Michigan. It was listed on the National Register of Historic Places in 1982.

== History ==
Isaac R. Middlesworth was born in Sussex County, New Jersey, and worked s a surveyor. In 1836, he moved to this area, purchasing 320 acres of land. Middlesworth later served as township supervisor in 1856. At some point, likely between the late 1830s and 1850s, he constructed this house.

== Description ==
The Isaac R. Middlesworth Farm House is a one-and-one-half-story, wood-frame vernacular Greek Revival structure. It is rectangular, with a symmetrical facade having a centrally placed entry door with sidelights and transom framed by a classical portico. The windows are six-over-six double hung units. The corners of the house have pilasters. Five rectangular windows are placed above within a wide frieze, under a boxed cornice with returns.
