= House at 4305 South Linden Road =

- U.S. National Register of Historic Places
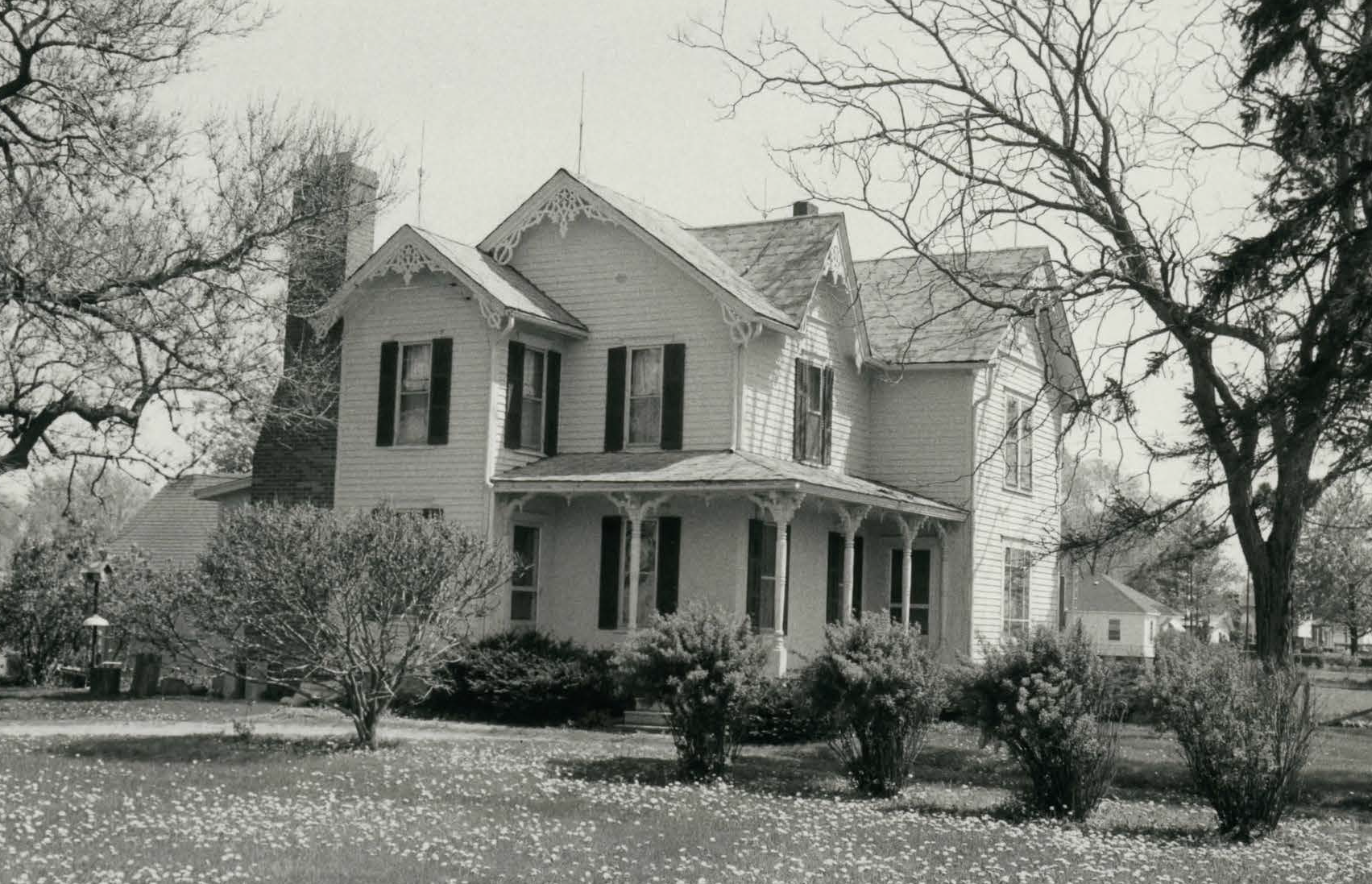
- Interactive map
- Location: 4305 S. Linden Rd., Flint, Michigan
- Coordinates: 42°57′52″N 83°46′16″W
- Area: less than one acre
- Built: 1878
- Architectural style: Queen Anne
- MPS: Genesee County MRA
- NRHP reference No.: 82000516
- Added to NRHP: November 26, 1982

The House at 4305 South Linden Road is a single-family home located in Flint, Michigan. It was listed on the National Register of Historic Places in 1982.

This house is a two-story frame Queen Anne-style structure, likely constructed in 1878. It has a typical Queen Anne irregular massing, but the exterior contains decidedly Gothic ornamentation. The front has a wraparound porch supported by delicately turned posts, and is decorated with brackets, pendants, and vergeboards resembling icicles. The roof gable ends on the house contain similar lacy vergeboards.
