= House at 10410 Stanley Road =

- U.S. National Register of Historic Places
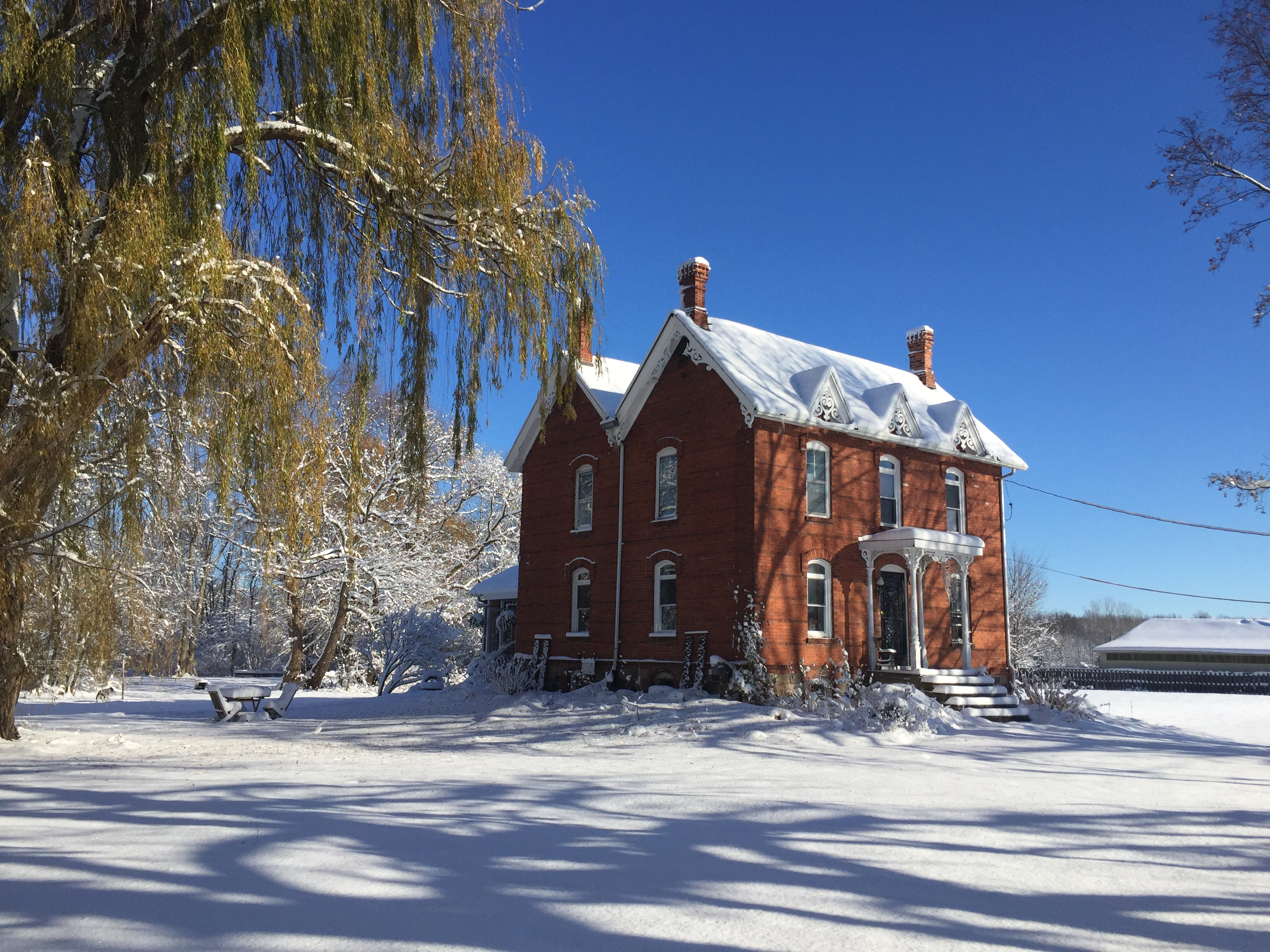
- Interactive map
- Location: 10410 Stanley Rd., Flushing, Michigan
- Coordinates: 43°06′13″N 83°53′18″W
- Area: less than one acre
- Architectural style: Gothic
- MPS: Genesee County MRA
- NRHP reference No.: 82000514
- Added to NRHP: November 26, 1982

The House at 10410 Stanley Road is a single-family home located in Flushing, Michigan. It was listed on the National Register of Historic Places in 1982.

The construction date of this house is unknown. Architecturally, the house itself is one of the most unusual of the nineteenth century residences in Genesee County. It is a two-story brick structure, composed of two rectangular sections with steeply pitched gable-roofs, linked at the sides by their cornicelines. The roof has three gabled dormers. All the gable ends and gable dormers contain elaborate, lacy vergeboards, giving the house a Gothic appearance. The windows in the facade are symmetrically placed, and are topped with segmented brick arches. The brickwork features a decorative brick bond with six stretcher rows placed between single rows of headers.
