= Flint Brewing Company Building =

- Flint Brewing Company
- Formerly listed on the U.S. National Register of Historic Places
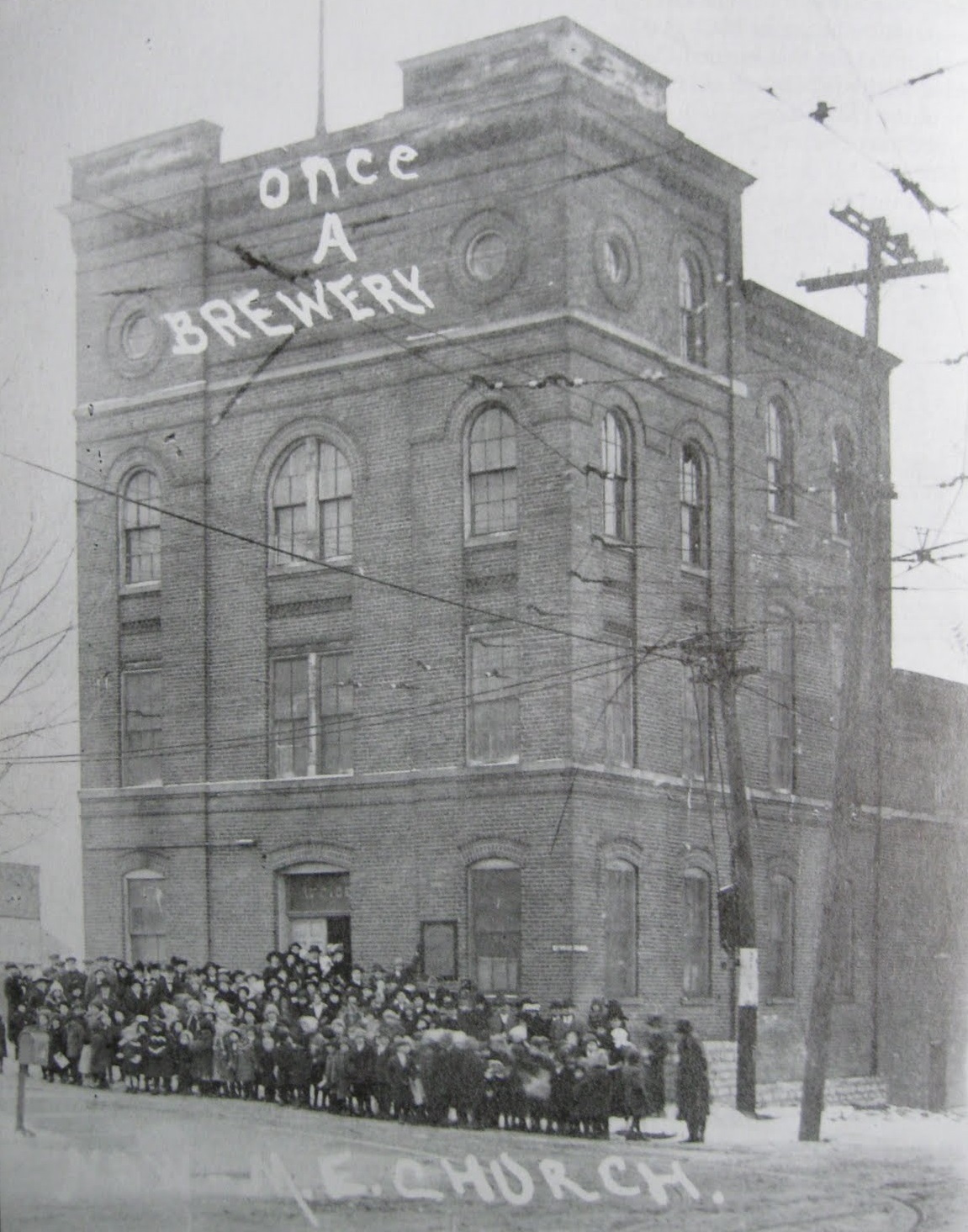
- Flint Brewing Company Building in 1915, after conversion to a church
- Interactive map
- Location: 2001 S. Saginaw St., Flint, Michigan
- Coordinates: 43°00′14″N 83°40′39″W
- Area: 3.8 acres (1.5 ha)
- Built: 1896
- Architectural style: Italianate, Commercial Italianate
- Demolished: 1992
- NRHP reference No.: 80001854

Significant dates
- Added to NRHP: April 10, 1980
- Removed from NRHP: July 1, 2020

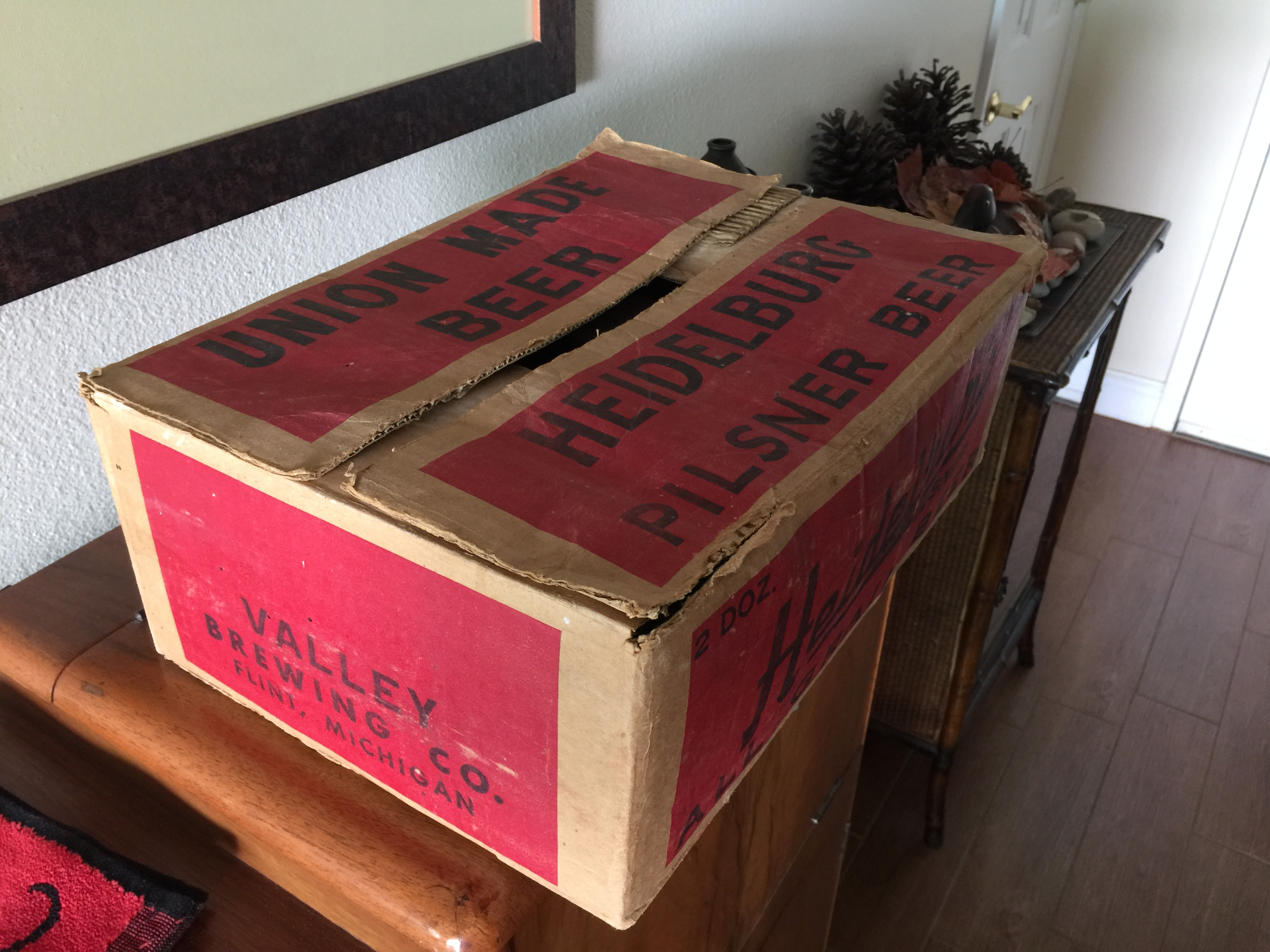
Valley Brewery, Flint Michigan

The Flint Brewing Company Building was a former brewery located at 2001 South Saginaw Street in Flint, Michigan. It was listed on the National Register of Historic Places in 1980, and removed from the list in 2020.

== History ==
In 1896, William Willdanger, Robert Wisler, and Adam Ketterman established the Flint Brewing Company. They constructed this utilitarian building on Saginaw Street as a brewery and began an aggressive advertising campaign that won them a share of the local market. The brewery remained successful until 1915, when Genesee County voted to go dry. The Flint Brewing Company went bankrupt and the building closed. Later in 1915, a group of Methodists purchased the building and turned it into the Lakeside Methodist Episcopal Church, as a way of demonstrating religion's victory over alcohol. Within a few years the church moved out, and a trucking firm began using the building as warehouse space. By the mid-1920s, the Acetylene Welding Company and the Boyd Sign Factory were also using the building, and in 1928 the Flint Casket and Woodwork Company moved in.

In the early 1930s, Genesee County repealed its prohibition ordinance, and in 1933 the Flint Hill Brewing Company purchased the building and refitted it to restart brewing beer. The company was successful, and in 1939, it was purchased by the White Seal Brewing Company. In 1949 White Seal was absorbed by Valley Brewing, who used the building until 1953, when larger conglomerates began taking over the local beer market. The brewery remained vacant until 1965, when the Flint Automation company Machinery Manufacturers moved in. They left in 1971, and the brewery was again vacant until purchased by local developers in 1980. The building eventually burned, and what remained was demolished in 1992.

== Description ==
The Flint Brewing Company Building was a brick structure, constructed in three distinct segments ranging from two to four stories in height. The northernmost segment was four stories in height and three bays wide on the side facade, with bowed-arch windows at the first floor, rectangular windows at the second, full arch windows at the third, and a pair of ocular windows on the top floor. The facade was detailed with brick and stone bandcourses above the first and third level, and an elaborate brick corniceline at the top of the building. The street-side facade was two bays wide with similar windows. The center section was three stories high and two bays wide, with bowed-arch windows on the first and second floors and rounded-arch windows on the third floor. The first section's brick and stone bandcourse above the first floor continued in this section, and the corniceline detailing was similar. The third section of the brewery was a two stories high and one bay wide with rectangular windows on each floor. This section also had a continuation of the first floor bandcourse and the ornamental corniceline.

Three more additions, lower in height than the 1898 building, were constructed in 1928, 1934, and 1944.
