= John Van Buskirk Farm House =

- U.S. National Register of Historic Places
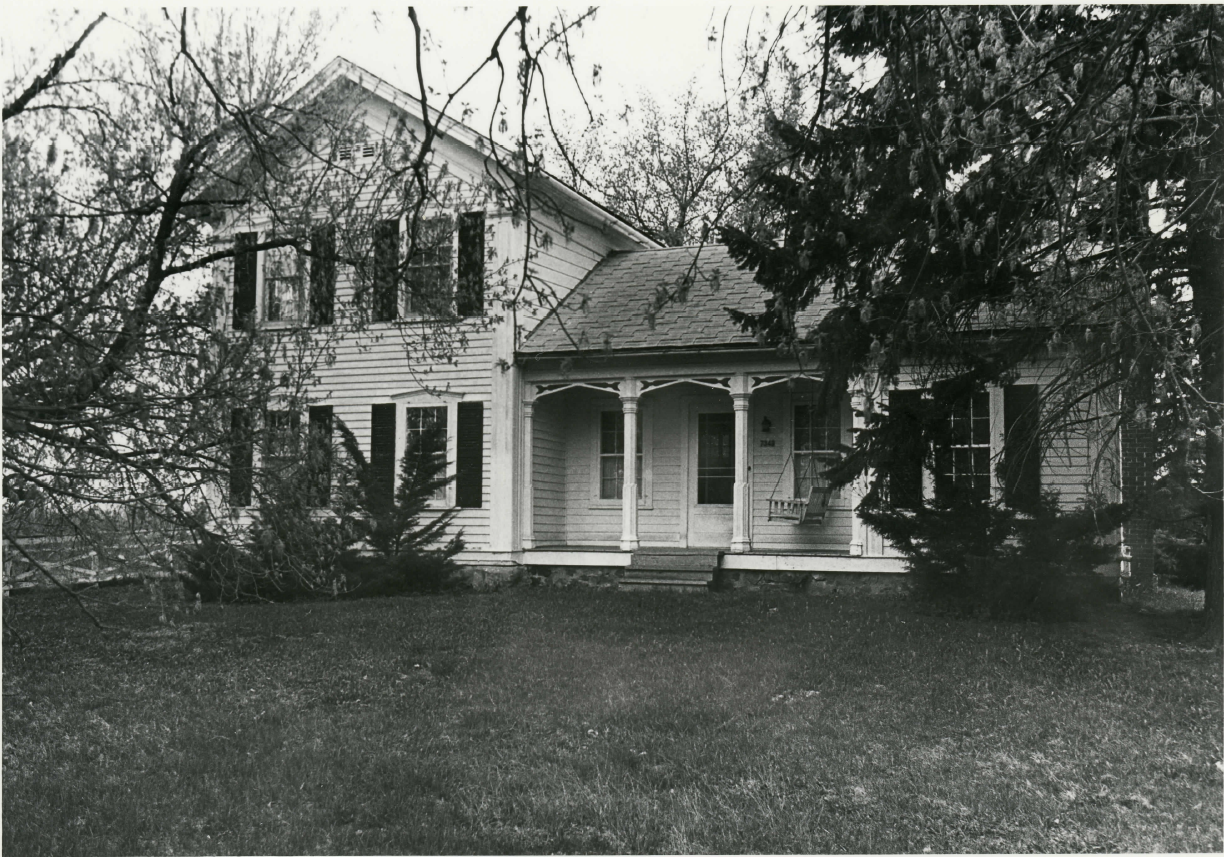
- Interactive map
- Location: 7348 Coldwater Rd., Davison, Michigan
- Coordinates: 43°05′29″N 83°33′53″W
- Area: less than one acre
- Built: 1850
- Architectural style: Greek Revival
- MPS: Genesee County MRA
- NRHP reference No.: 83000847
- Added to NRHP: June 20, 1983

The John Van Buskirk Farm House is a single-family home located at 7348 Coldwater Road in Davison, Michigan. It was listed on the National Register of Historic Places in 1983.

== History ==
John Van Buskirk was an early settler in the area, and constructed this house in about 1850. Van Buskirk was active in the community, serving as Overseer of the Poor from 1857 to 1858 and later as the President of the Union Lyceum Building Society, an organization founded to collect funds to build a church.

== Description ==
The John Van Buskirk Farm House is a Greek Revival structure, fronted by a recessed porch with decorative paneled posts and overhead bargeboard. The window openings are symmetrically placed and have pedimented hoods. The main section of the house has unusual paneled corner pilasters and a wide friezealong the eavesline.
