= Parker and Dunstan Hardware Building =

- Parker and Dunstan Hardware/Dr. E. D. Lewis Building
- U.S. National Register of Historic Places
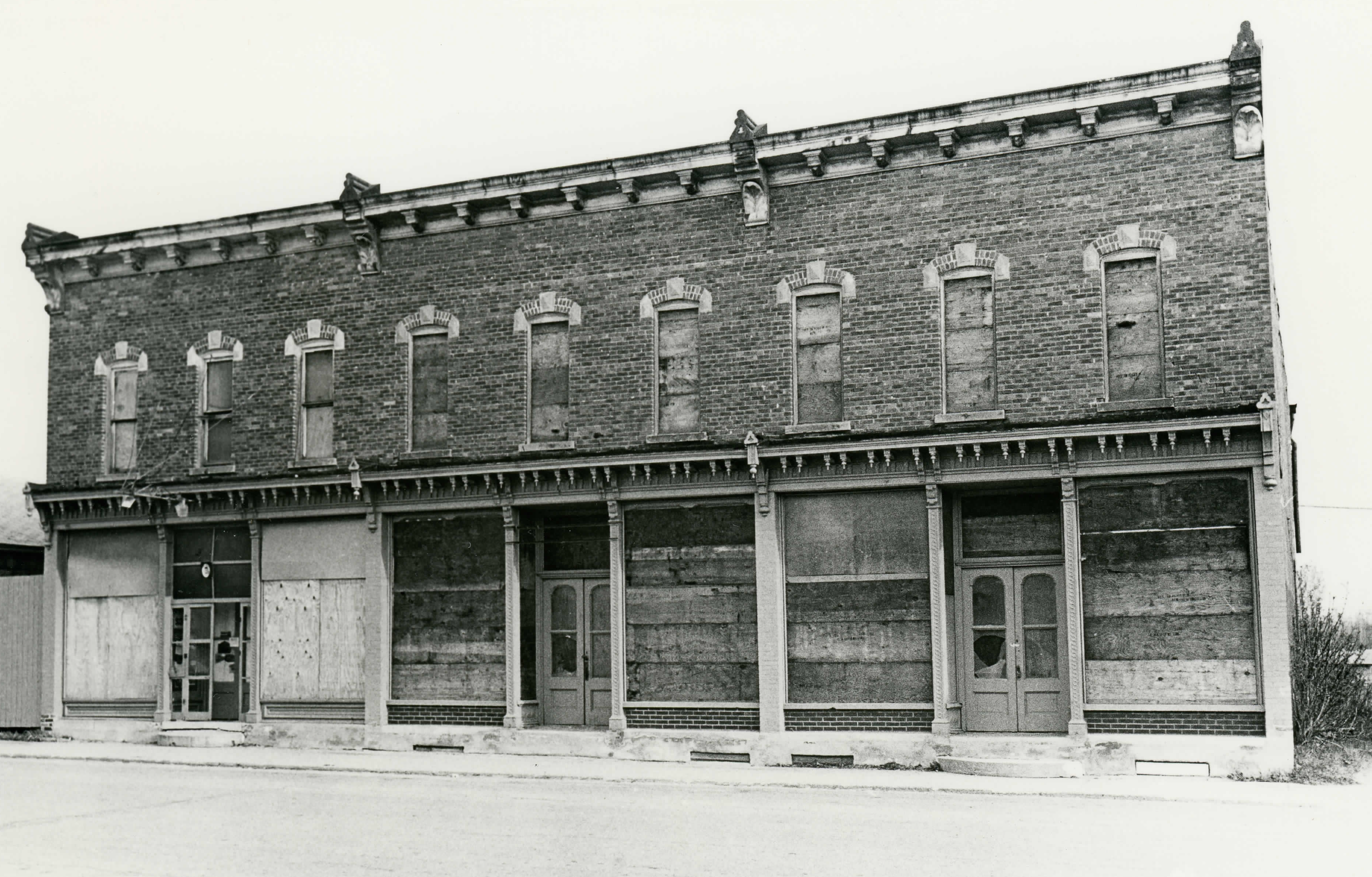
- Interactive map
- Location: 129–133 W. Main St., Otisville, Michigan
- Coordinates: 43°09′57″N 83°31′31″W
- Area: less than one acre
- Built: 1884
- Architectural style: Italianate
- MPS: Genesee County MRA
- NRHP reference No.: 82000528
- Added to NRHP: November 26, 1982

The Parker and Dunstan Hardware Building, also known as the Dr. E. D. Lewis Building, was a commercial structure located along West Main Street in Otisville, Michigan. It was listed on the National Register of Historic Places in 1982.

== History ==
Otisville was founded in the 1850s by Frances Otis and his two brothers, who moved to this area from Cleveland, Ohio and purchased 2000 acres of land. William Otis and T. D. Crocker platted the village in 1863, and attracted a number of settlers to the area. This building to the area by the mill with the basic necessities of life. This commercial building was constructed in Otisville in 1884, and was used at various times by the Parker and Dunstan partnership as a hardware or general store, and by Dr. E. D. Lewis as a drugstore.

The building has apparently been demolished at some point after the early 1980s.

== Description ==
The Parker and Dunstan Hardware Building was a two-story brick Italianate commercial brick structure. It had pressed metal cornice with brackets, and an unaltered storefront facade, three stores wide, complete with cast iron support columns, multi-paned display windows, and wood-framed entryways. The existence of such an unaltered commercial facade is rare.
