= House at 6112 Carpenter Road =

- U.S. National Register of Historic Places
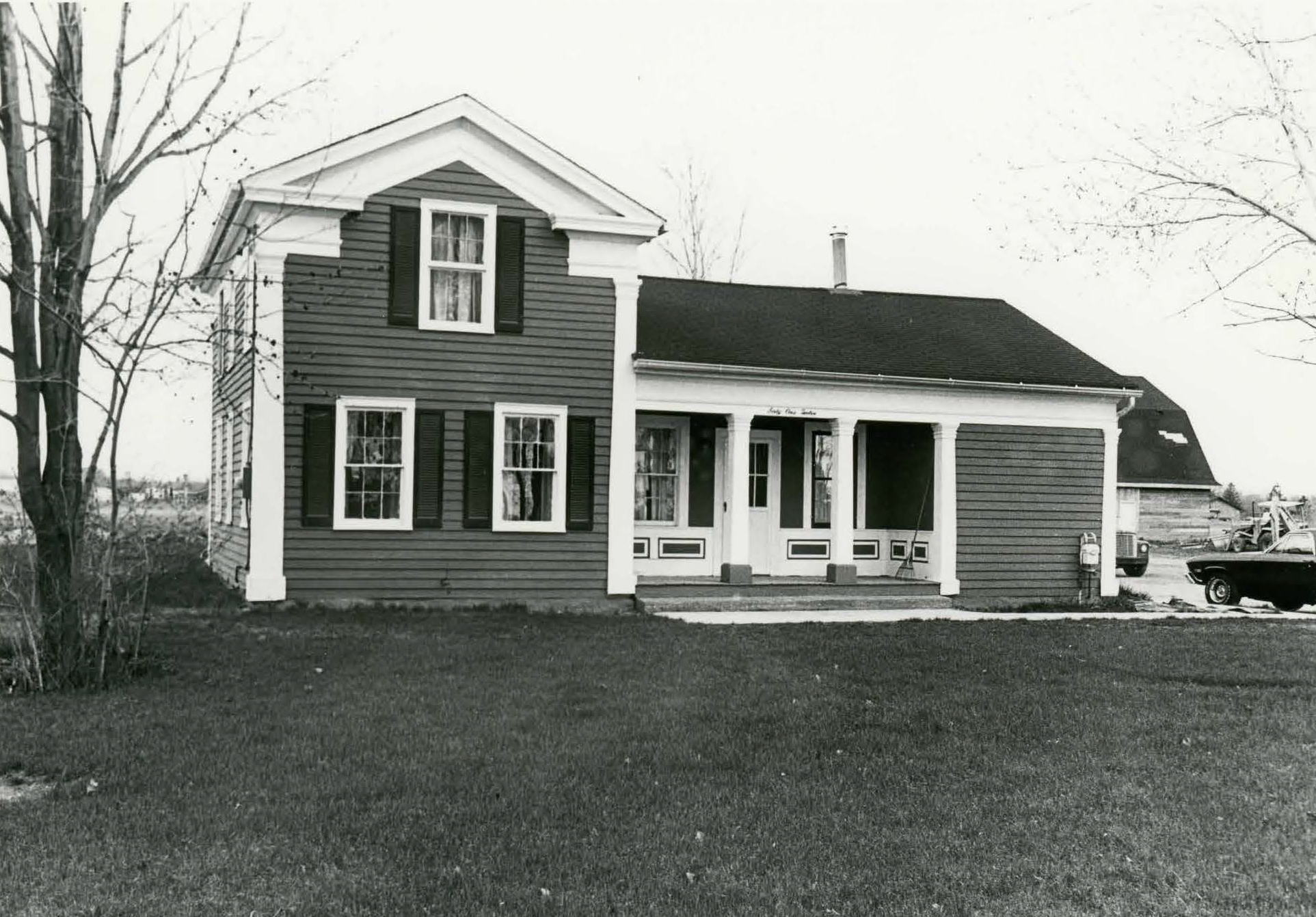
- Interactive map
- Location: 6112 Carpenter Rd., Flint, Michigan
- Coordinates: 43°05′03″N 83°35′34″W
- Area: less than one acre
- Built: c. 1850
- Architectural style: Greek Revival
- MPS: Genesee County MRA
- NRHP reference No.: 82000513
- Added to NRHP: November 26, 1982

The House at 6112 Carpenter Road is a single-family home located in Flint, Michigan. It was listed on the National Register of Historic Places in 1982.

The house was likely built some time between 1840 and 1860. It is an L-shaped Greek Revival structure. The main portion is two stories high and features corner pilasters, a wide entablature, and a cornice with returns. The second section is one story high, and includes a porch with Classically detailed pillars. One notable feature of this house is its reduced dimensions: although maintaining the same proportions, it is smaller overall than similar homes in the area.
