= Volney Church-Carlos B. Shotwell House =

- U.S. National Register of Historic Places
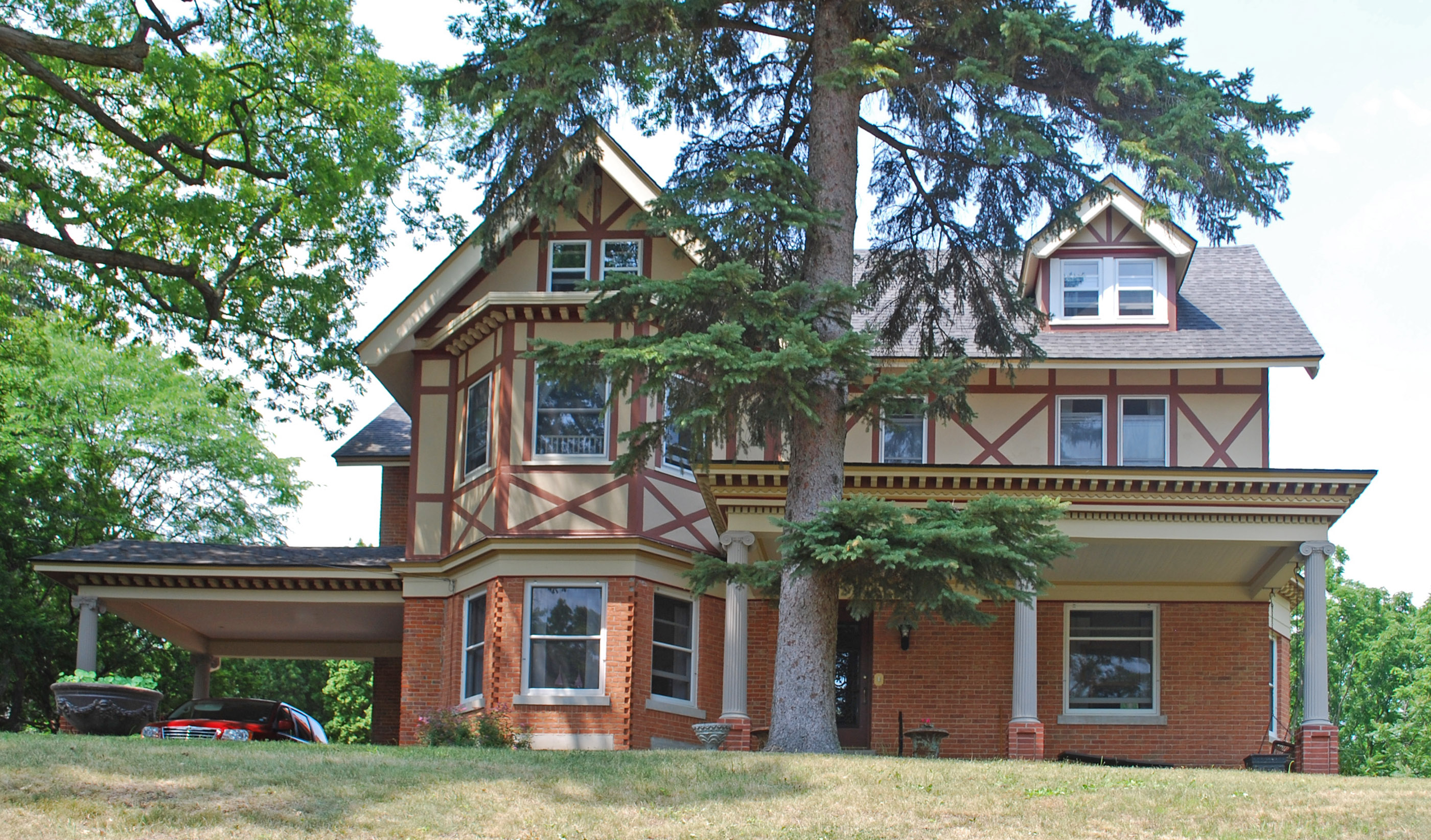

- Location within Michigan Location within the United States
- Interactive map
- Location: 812 S. Adelaide St., Fenton, Michigan
- Coordinates: 42°47′20″N 83°42′26″W
- Area: less than one acre
- Built: 1869
- Architectural style: Classical Revival, Queen Anne
- MPS: Genesee County MRA
- NRHP reference No.: 82000505
- Added to NRHP: November 26, 1982

The Volney Church-Carlos B. Shotwell House is a single-family home located at 812 South Adelaide Street in Fenton, Michigan. It was listed on the National Register of Historic Places in 1982.

== History ==
The original portion of this house was constructed in 1869 for Volney Church. In 1903, the house was purchased by Carlos Shotwell, the Secretary of the Egyptian Portland Cement Company. Shotwell conducted an extensive renovation project, turning the formerly unimposing structure into an elegant mansion.

== Description ==
The Church-Shotwell House is a two-and-one-half-story structure built with a combination of Classical Revival and Queen Anne features. The house has irregular massing and a multi-gabled roofline, reflecting characteristically Queen Anne styling. Additional ornamentation on the building, including modillioned cornices and a gabled porte cochere with Ionic columns, reflects classical inspiration. Much of the home is brick, but some of the renovated portions are constructed from cement produced by Shotwell's company.
