= Genesee Avenue–Walker Street Historic District =

- U.S. National Register of Historic Places
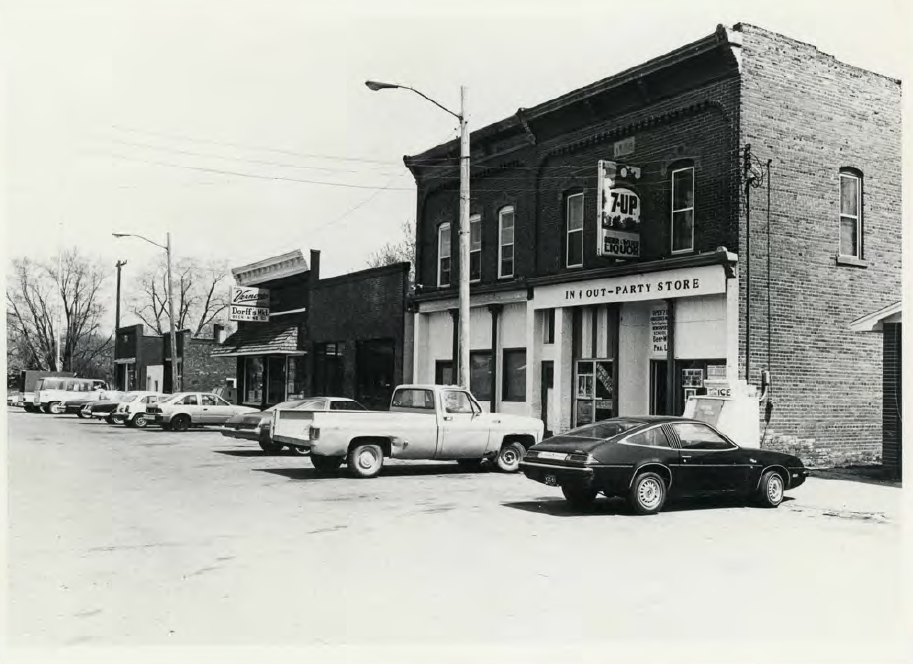

- Location within Michigan Location within the United States
- Interactive map
- Location: Roughly bounded by Washington, Elm, Lord streets, and railroad tracks, Gaines, Michigan
- Coordinates: 42°52′21″N 83°54′48″W
- Area: 5.6 acres (2.3 ha)
- Architectural style: Italianate
- MPS: Genesee County MRA
- NRHP reference No.: 83000845
- Added to NRHP: June 20, 1983

The Genesee Avenue–Walker Street Historic District is a primarily commercial- and railroad-oriented historic district, located along three blocks of Walker Street and one intersecting block of Genesee Avenue in Gaines, Michigan. It was listed on the National Register of Historic Places in 1983.

== History ==
Gaines, named for War of 1812 Veteran Edmund T. Gaines, was founded in 1859, soon after the Detroit, Grand Haven and Milwaukee Railway laid tracks through Genesee County and established a station at the location. A small village sprang up, with two hotels established in the 1860s, and a grain elevator and numerous stores and businesses constructed by 1875. However, the 1870s marked the peak of the growth in Gaines, and the downtown remained concentrated in a single block. It served as a transportation hub for the local economy, until the last passenger train run in 1958.

== Description ==
The district includes a total of 16 properties, of which all but three contribute to the historical character of the district. Of the 16, seven are commercial, six are railroad-related, one is residential, one is a post office, and the remaining building is a city hall. The district encompasses a T-shaped area, including structures along both sides of Genesee Avenue between Lord and Walker streets, and six structures between Walker Street and the railroad tracks between Washington and Elm streets.

The most visually distinctive structure in the district is the L-plan depot, constructed of uncommon yellow and red brick. Built in 1884 to replace the original depot, it is a single-story depot Victorian Eclectic building with decorative features such as circular openings, stepped corbeling in the gable ends, and large wooden brackets, terminating in stone, supporting the eaves.

The remaining buildings include two frame warehouses, lumberyard, and a grain elevator located alongside the railroad tracks. These are functional in design. The buildings along Genesee Avenue are primarily one- and two-story commercial buildings constructed from brick, though a few frame structures are included. The storefronts have 19th-century Italianate and Victorian Eclectic features, including cast-iron columns, cornices, and recessed entrances.
