= House at 5556 Flushing Road =

- U.S. National Register of Historic Places
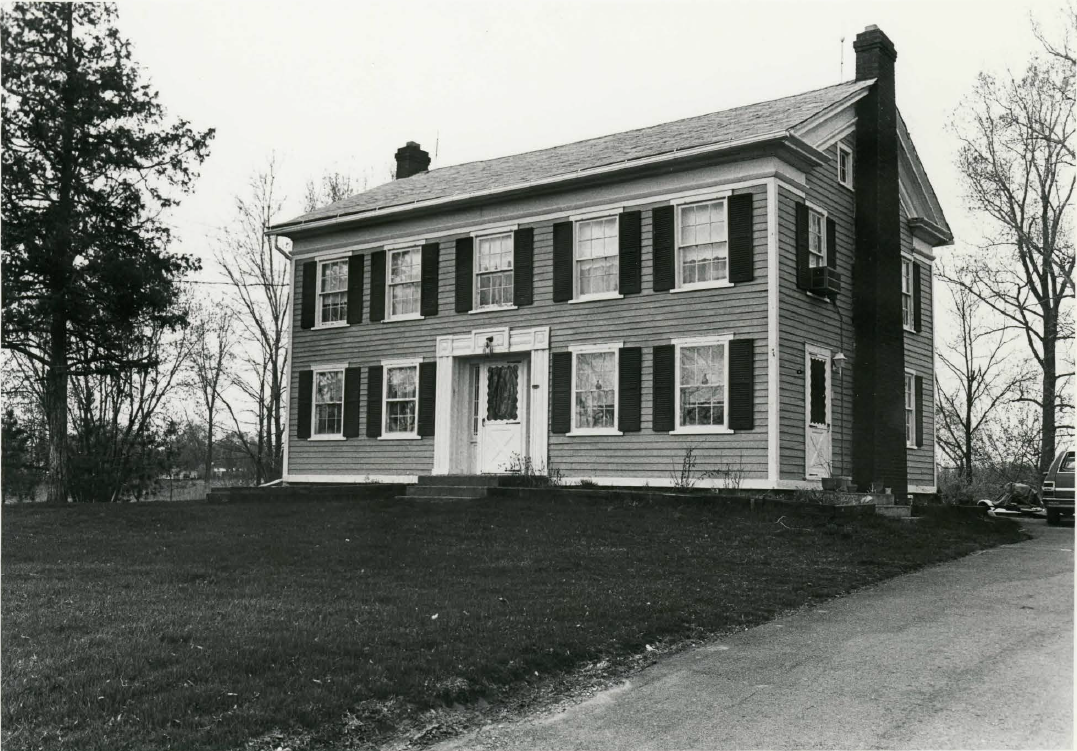
- Interactive map
- Location: 5556 Flushing Rd., Flushing, Michigan
- Coordinates: 43°02′39″N 83°47′25″W
- Area: less than one acre
- Architectural style: Greek Revival
- MPS: Genesee County MRA
- NRHP reference No.: 82000518
- Added to NRHP: November 26, 1982

The House at 5556 Flushing Road is a single-family home located in Flushing, Michigan. It was listed on the National Register of Historic Places in 1982.

The house was likely built sometime between 1840 and 1860. It is a two-story Greek Revival structure with a rectangular floor plan. The facade is symmetrical, and five bays wide. The entrance is through a centrally placed door, flanked with paneled pilasters and topped with an entablature. The house is topped with a wide frieze and a cornice with returns.
