= Calvin Coolidge Elementary School =

- U.S. National Register of Historic Places
- Interactive map
- Location: 3701 Van Buren Ave., Flint, Michigan
- Coordinates: 43°00′35″N 83°43′58″W
- Built: 1928
- Architect: Malcomson and Higginbotham
- Architectural style: Tudor Revival
- NRHP reference No.: 100002067
- Added to NRHP: February 1, 2018

The Calvin Coolidge Elementary School is a former school building located at 3701 Van Buren Avenue in Flint, Michigan. It was listed on the National Register of Historic Places in 2018. The building now houses Coolidge Park Apartments.

== History ==
The population of Flint expanded in the 1920s. In 1928, the Flint School Board promised the residents of the city's fourth ward their own elementary and junior high school. The district tasked the architectural firm of Malcomson and Higginbotham with designing the new school. Construction began in 1928, and the school opened in 1929. It was named after current US President Calvin Coolidge.

Flint continued to grow over the next few decades, and an addition to accommodate more pupils was constructed in 1952. In the 1970s, a gymnasium was added to the building. However, the population of Flint dropped considerably over the next years, and the school closed its doors in 2011. In 2018, Communities First began plans to renovate the building into apartments and commercial space.

The renovation was completed in 2019, turning the building into 54 apartments along with retail space.

== Description ==
The former Calvin Coolidge Elementary School is a two-story red brick Tudor Revival building. It has a hipped metal roof and limestone trim. A limestone water table runs atop the slightly raised basement, and a second limestone band runs over the second floor windows. The window and door openings are framed in limestone, and limestone quoins are at the building corners. The main elevation is five bays wide, with a slightly projecting center entrance bay. The entrance is through double doors in an arched opening. Above the door is a limestone carved to read "Calvin Coolidge."
