= David B. Colwell House =

- U.S. National Register of Historic Places
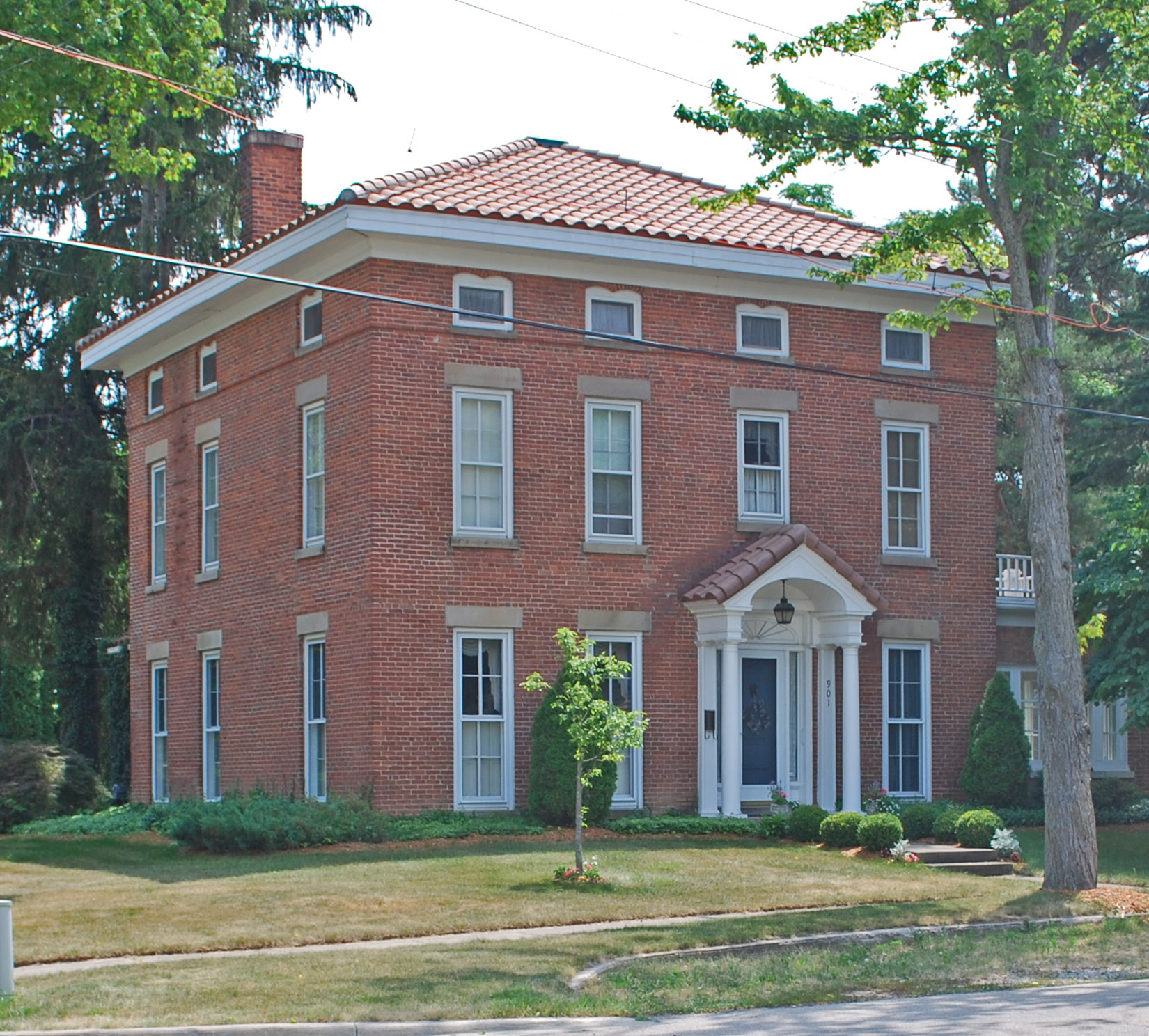

- Location within Michigan Location within the United States
- Interactive map showing the location of David B. Colwell House
- Location: 901 S. Leroy St., Fenton, Michigan
- Coordinates: 42°47′16″N 83°42′17″W
- Area: less than one acre
- Built: 1870
- Built by: David B. Colwell
- Architectural style: Italianate
- MPS: Genesee County MRA
- NRHP reference No.: 82000506
- Added to NRHP: November 26, 1982

The David B. Colwell House is a single family home located at 901 South Leroy Street in Fenton, Michigan. It was listed on the National Register of Historic Places in 1982.

== History ==
David B. Colwell and Edwin Adams owned and operated the Fenton Flour Mills. In 1870, Colwell built this house for his family. In 1880, he bought out his partner, and continued to operate the flour mill on his own.

== Description ==
The David B. Colwell House is a two-and-one-half story square brick Italianate house with a small, one-story addition constructed some time in the twentieth century. The front facade has a Classical gabled portico over an entry door with sidelights and an entablature. The windows on the first and second floor are four-over-four double hung sash units, placed symmetrically. Windows have stone lug sills and lintels. A brick beltcourse separates the second and attic stories. The attic story has small rectangular windows located in the frieze. The house has a low-pitched hip roof with overhanging eaves, covered with light red tiles added at a later date.
