= Harry C. Tinker House =

- U.S. National Register of Historic Places
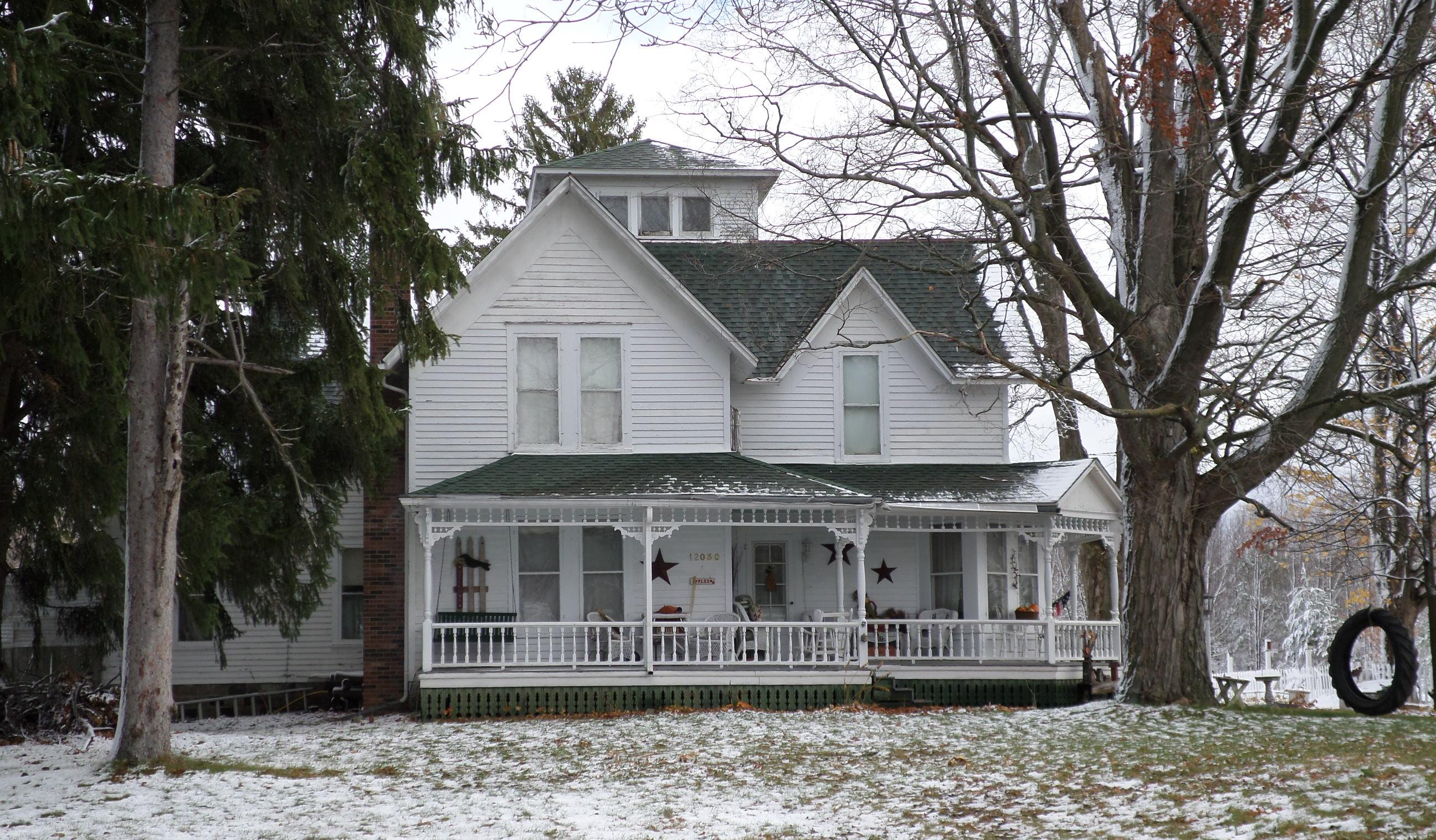
- Interactive map
- Location: 12030 Lewis Rd., Clio, Michigan
- Coordinates: 43°10′46″N 83°40′46″W
- Area: 16 acres (6.5 ha)
- Architectural style: Queen Anne
- MPS: Genesee County MRA
- NRHP reference No.: 82000531
- Added to NRHP: November 26, 1982

The Harry C. Tinker House is a bed and breakfast located at 12030 Lewis Road in Clio, Michigan. It was listed on the National Register of Historic Places in 1982.

== History ==
William Tinker and his son, William Jr., lived in Ashtabula, Ohio, where they invented and manufactured machinery such as threshing and mowing equipment. IN 1865, the Tinkers move to this area in Genesee County. The two started a trade in general machinery repair, as well manufacturing steam engines and other equipment used by the lumber industry. They purchased a cider mill, and later began producing cheese boxes, potato crates, and cider production machinery. William Jr.'s son Harry C. Tinker constructed this house some time later in the nineteenth century. Harry Tinker began the first telephone system in the area in 1891, and ran it until 1921, when he sold it to W. B. Serviss. He used this house as his phone system's main office.

== Description ==
The Harry C. Tinker House is a two-story Queen Anne style frame structure built in an L-shaped plan, typical of many midwestern farmhouses builtin the nineteenth century. The house has a multi-gabled roof with a central cupola. A wrap-around gable-roofed porch in the front contains turned balusters, bracketed columns, and a frieze along the top with turned spindles. IN addition to being used as the telephone system office, the house was reportedly the first in the county to have a central heating system, and the first farm house to be electrified.
