= Frank D. Bloss and Sons Farm House =

- U.S. National Register of Historic Places
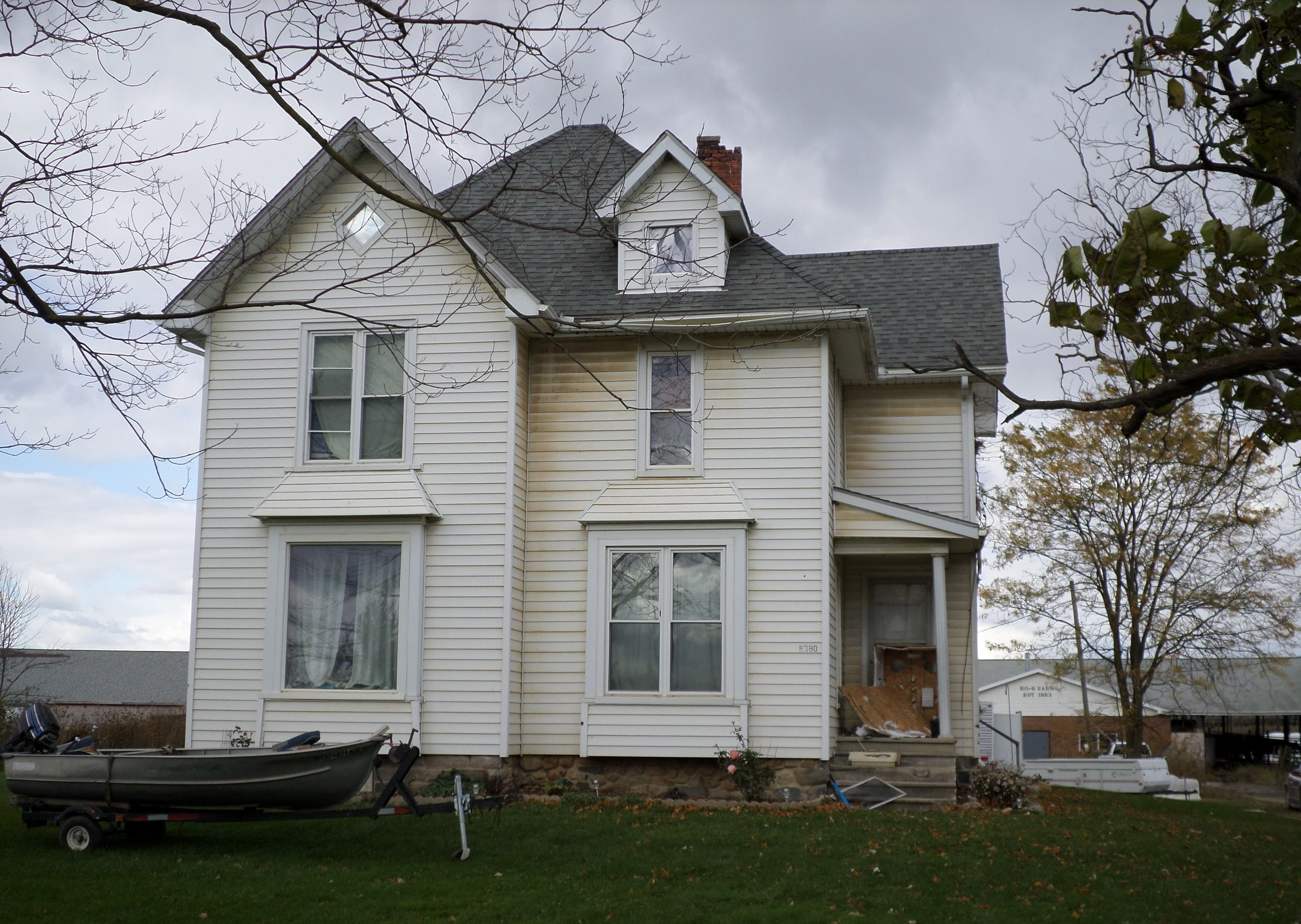
- Interactive map
- Location: 8380 Reid Rd., Swartz Creek, Michigan
- Coordinates: 42°55′39″N 83°50′44″W
- Area: less than one acre
- Built: 1893
- Architectural style: Queen Anne
- MPS: Genesee County MRA
- NRHP reference No.: 82000501
- Added to NRHP: November 26, 1982

The Frank D. Bloss and Sons Farm House is a single-family home located at 8380 Reid Rd., Swartz Creek, Michigan. It was listed on the National Register of Historic Places in 1982.

== History ==
Frank D. Bloss married Eunice Storer in 1881. In 1883 the couple purchased 40 acres of land, adding another 65 acres over the next ten years. In 1893, the Blosses sold an apiary of 400 hives, and used the profits to build this elaborate house in their property, using lumber harvested from the surrounding woods. Bloss later switched to farming sugar beets. In later years, the farm prospered and continued to be held by the Bloss family, becoming a cattle and dairy operation.

== Description ==
The Frank D. Bloss and Sons Farm House is a two-and-one-half-story irregularly massed frame structure, quite sophisticated for a rural farmhouse. It is topped by a multiple gable roof with a gable dormer. The house has a wide variety of windows, including rounded arch and diamond shaped openings and sash widows with small, colored panes enframing a larger pane. The house currently has an open, one bay entrance porch with turned balusters and bargeboards, replacing the original wrap-around porch with turned balusters.
