= Barn at 4277 Irish Road =

- U.S. National Register of Historic Places
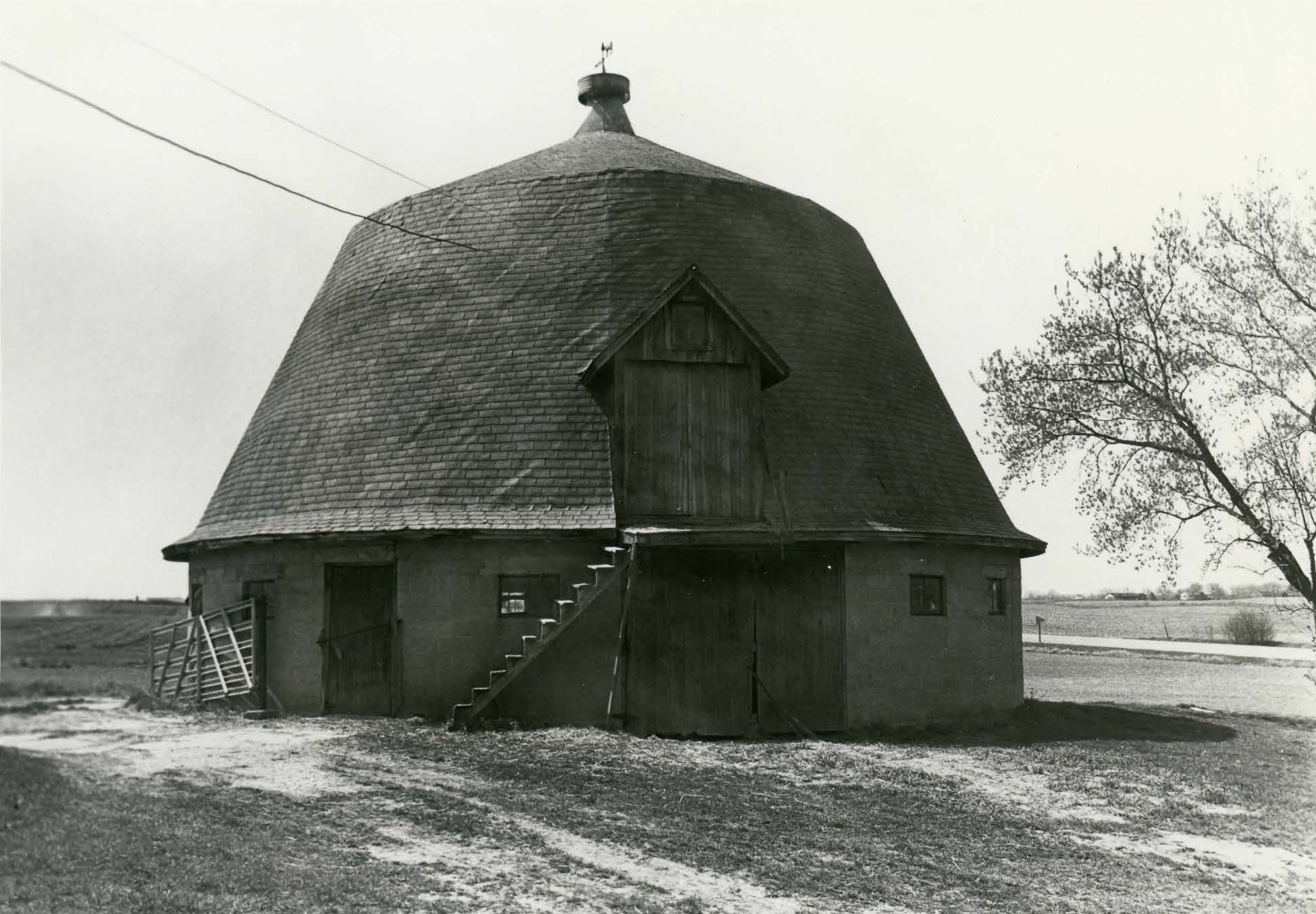

- Location within Michigan Location within the United States
- Interactive map
- Location: Davison, Michigan
- Coordinates: 42°58′5″N 83°33′13″W
- MPS: Genesee County MRA
- NRHP reference No.: 82000499
- Added to NRHP: November 26, 1982

The Barn at 4277 Irish Road in Davison, Michigan is a round barn built from concrete block with a round gambrel roof containing a gable dormer. It was built by farmer Erwin Gabel in the early twentieth century. It has a number of doors and windows around the circumference.
