= West Vienna United Methodist Church =

Historic church in Michigan, United States

- U.S. National Register of Historic Places
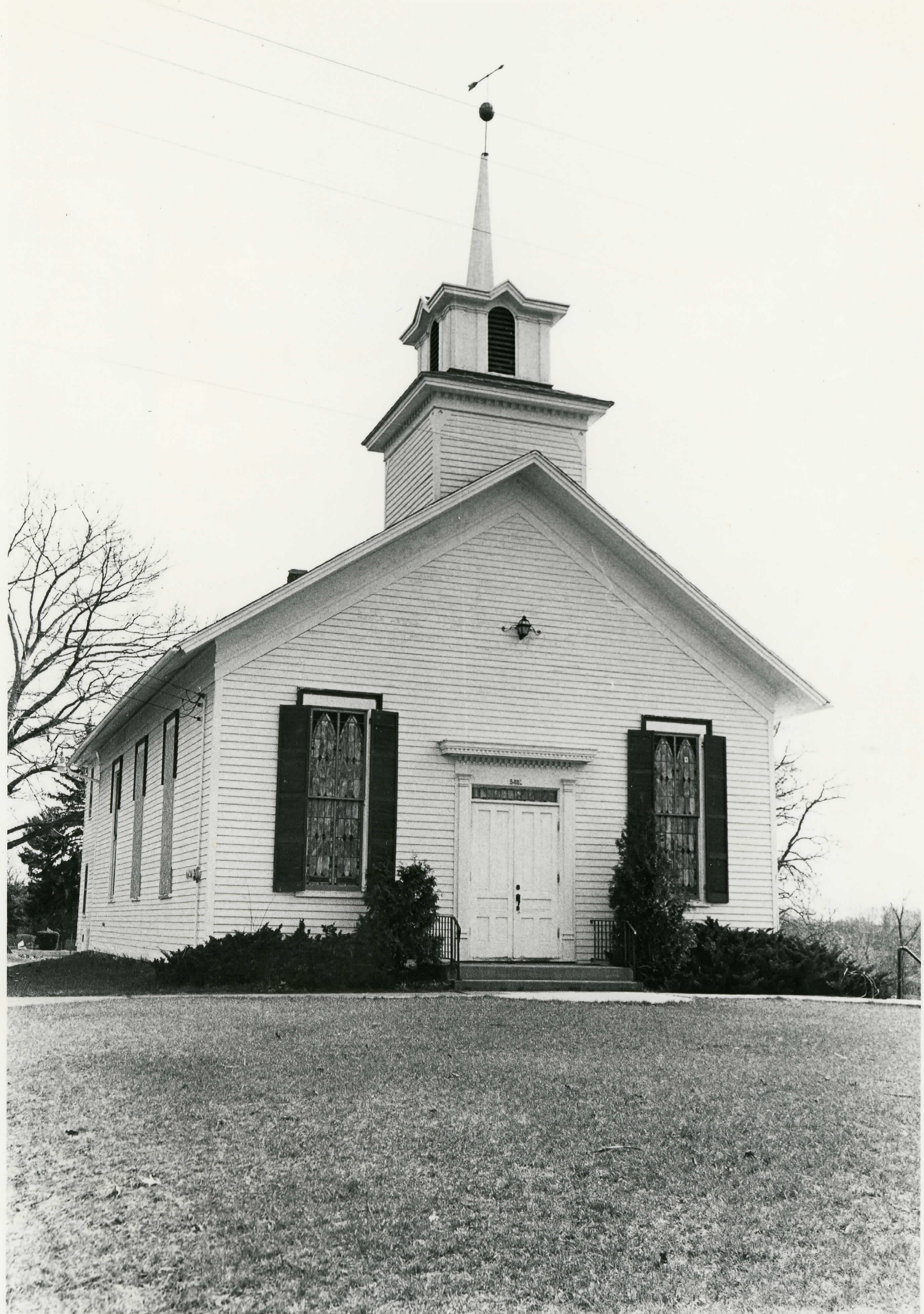
- Church in 1982

- Location within Michigan Location within the United States
- Interactive map
- Location: 5461 Wilson Rd., Clio, Michigan
- Coordinates: 43°9′45″N 83°47′30″W
- Area: less than one acre
- Built: 1882
- Architectural style: Greek Revival
- MPS: Genesee County MRA
- NRHP reference No.: 83000848
- Added to NRHP: June 20, 1983

West Vienna United Methodist Church was a historic church located at 5461 Wilson Road in Clio, Michigan, USA. It was listed on the National Register of Historic Places in 1983 and has apparently been demolished.

== History ==
The church congregation originally met in the West Vienna School House. They formed the West Vienna Cemetery Association in 1880 and, soon after, decided to build a church nearby. The new building was constructed and a dedication was held on October 12, 1882.

The township of Vienna later took over the cemetery. In 1978, a new church was built near the 1882 structure. The congregation still use this building. The new West Vienna United Methodist Church is located at 5485 Wilson Road. Presumably, the earlier building was demolished.

== Description ==
The West Vienna United Methodist Church was a rectangular gable end Greek Revival structure, three bays wide. It had a double door in the front facade, framed with classically detailed pilasters and a full entablature. A wide frieze ran around the top of the structure, and a square belfry was on top of the roof. The windows had stained glass panes.
