= H. Elmer Thayer House =

- U.S. National Register of Historic Places
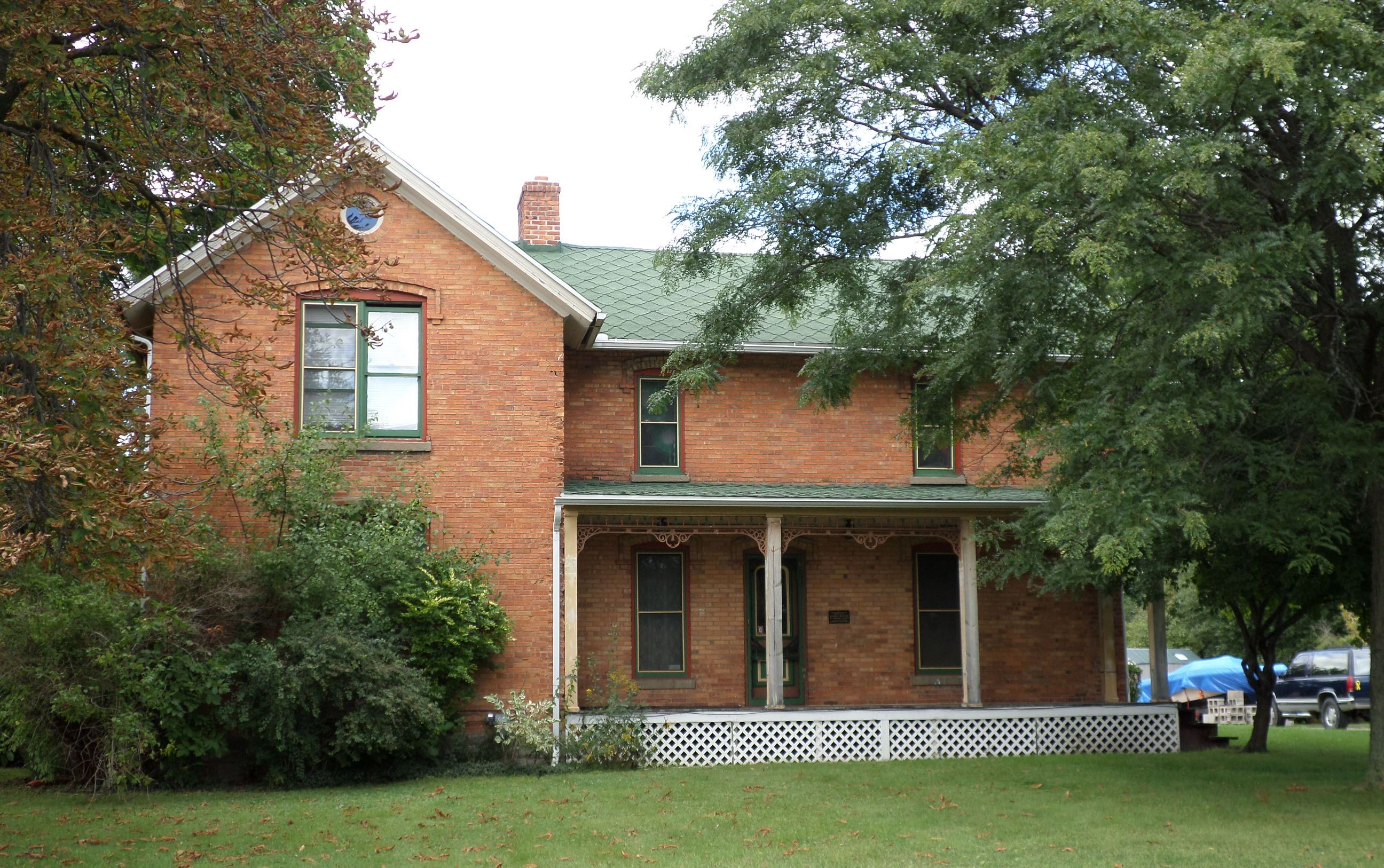
- Interactive map
- Location: G-3202 Court St., Flint, Michigan
- Coordinates: 43°00′26″N 83°44′27″W
- Area: less than one acre
- Built by: Henry Crow, George Utley
- Architectural style: Italianate
- MPS: Genesee County MRA
- NRHP reference No.: 82000530
- Added to NRHP: November 26, 1982

The H. Elmer Thayer House is a single-family home located at G-3202 Court Street in Flint, Michigan. It was listed on the National Register of Historic Places in 1982.

== History ==
The land on which this house stands was first owned by Jacob Smith, the first European settler in the Flint area. He deeded the land to Petabonaqua, the daughter of Col. Lewis Beaufait and an Indian woman. The property then passed through the hands of several prominent Michigan residents, including Stevens T. Mason, the first governor of the State of Michigan; Grant Decker, the first mayor of Flint; and George L. Utley. The exact construction date of the house itself is uncertain, but it was likely built some time between 1873 and 1889 by Utley, Henry Crow, or E. R. Cookingham. H. Elmer Thayer, Flint Township Supervisor from 1893 to 1902, is the first owner who certainly lived in the house.

== Description ==
The H. Elmer Thayer House is a two-story red brick Italianate structure with an L-shaped floor plan. The door and window openings are topped by double brick segmented arches. over the home's door and windows are the major decorative elements and lend an Italianate flavor to the structure. The house is fronted with an open veranda supported by turned and bracketed column; this is a reconstruction of the original porch which was lost through deterioration and vandalism.
