= Swayze Court Apartments =

- Swayze Apartments
- U.S. National Register of Historic Places
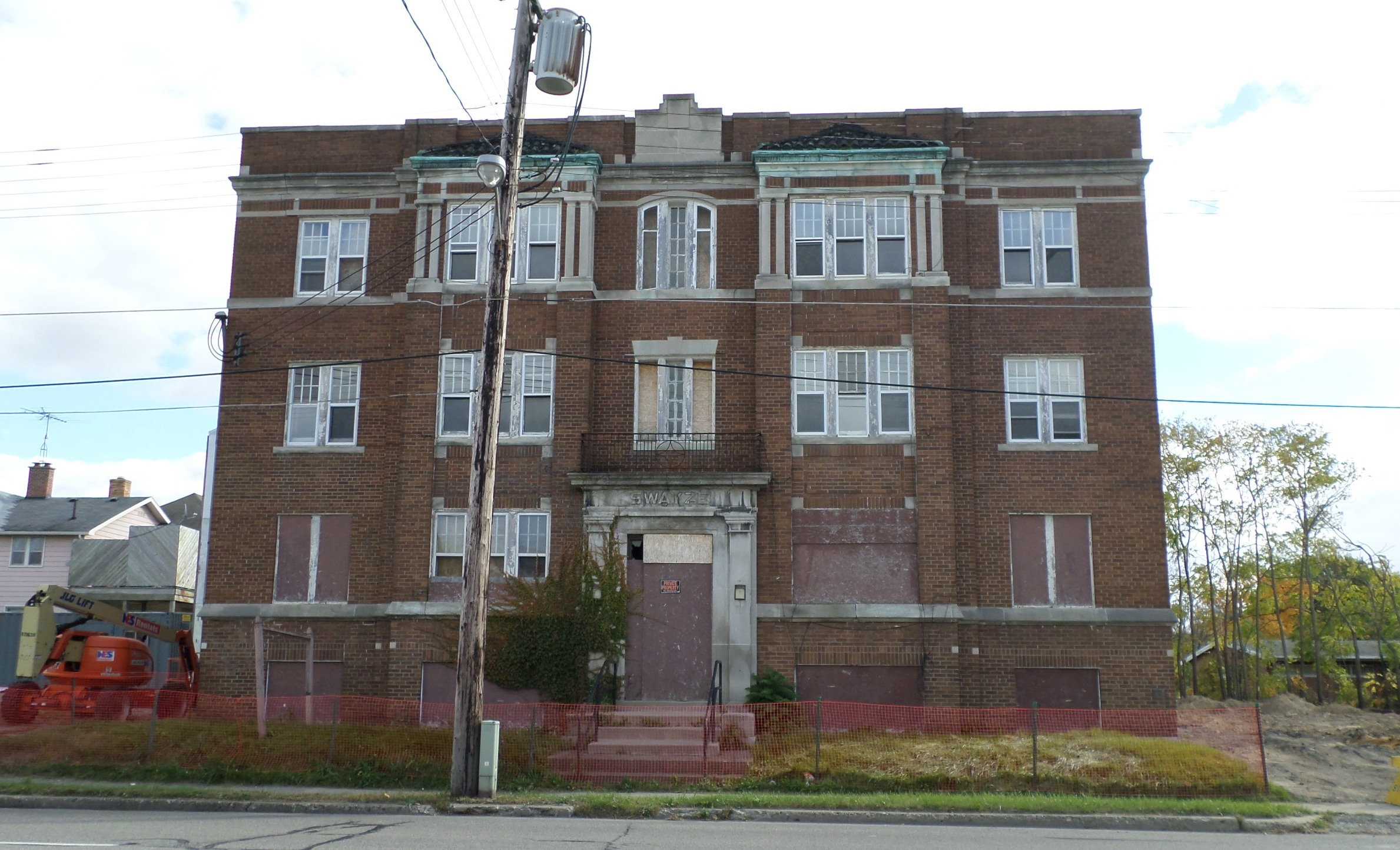
- Apartments in 2015, before renovation
- Interactive map
- Location: 313 W. Court St., Flint, Michigan
- Coordinates: 43°00′39″N 83°41′27″W
- Built: 1924
- Architect: Paul C. Kroske
- Architectural style: Classical Revival
- NRHP reference No.: 15000363
- Added to NRHP: July 10, 2015

Swayze Court Apartments (also called Swayze Apartments) is an apartment building located at 313 W. Court Street in Flint, Michigan. The building was listed on the National Register of Historic Places in 2015.

== History ==
Flint at the beginning of the twentieth century was experiencing explosive growth tied to the growth of the automotive industry. The city's population increased from under 40,000 in 1910 to over 150,000 in 1930, leading to a shortage of housing space. In 1924, William S. Ballenger Sr., one of the founders of Buick Motor Company, constructed the Swayze Apartments. Ballenger hired Detroit architect Paul C. Kroske to design the building. It was originally home to many General Motors executives, as well as Flint business people and families. However, by 2000 the building was vacant and slowly falling into disrepair. In 2015, local nonprofit Communities First began rehabilitation of the building. Restoration was completed in 2017.

== Description ==
The Swayze Apartments is a three-story, C-shaped red brick apartment building with limestone trim. It is built in an eclectic style typical of the 1920s, combining a Classical Revival and Commercial Brick base with touches of Mediterranean or Spanish Eclectic style. The latter is exemplified by the red tile roofs on the front projecting bays and a low arched front window. The front facade is five bays wide, divided into three horizontal sections by a thick limestone water table at the sill line of the first floor windows and another limestone band at the third floor window sill line.

The central bay contains the entrance, with a stone entrance surround containing Doric pilasters supporting a flat-top entablature with "SWAYZE" carved in the frieze. Above are three narrow multipane windows in both the second and third floors. A parapet wall runs along the top. The two flanking bays the project slightly, and have tile covered hip roofs. Both bays contain a group of three six-over-one doublehung windows. The third-floor windows in these bays are flanked by paired Doric pilasters. The two end bays contain a pair of six-over-one double-hung windows at each floor.

Swayze Court Apartments contains 36 units.
