= Edwin Trump House =

- U.S. National Register of Historic Places
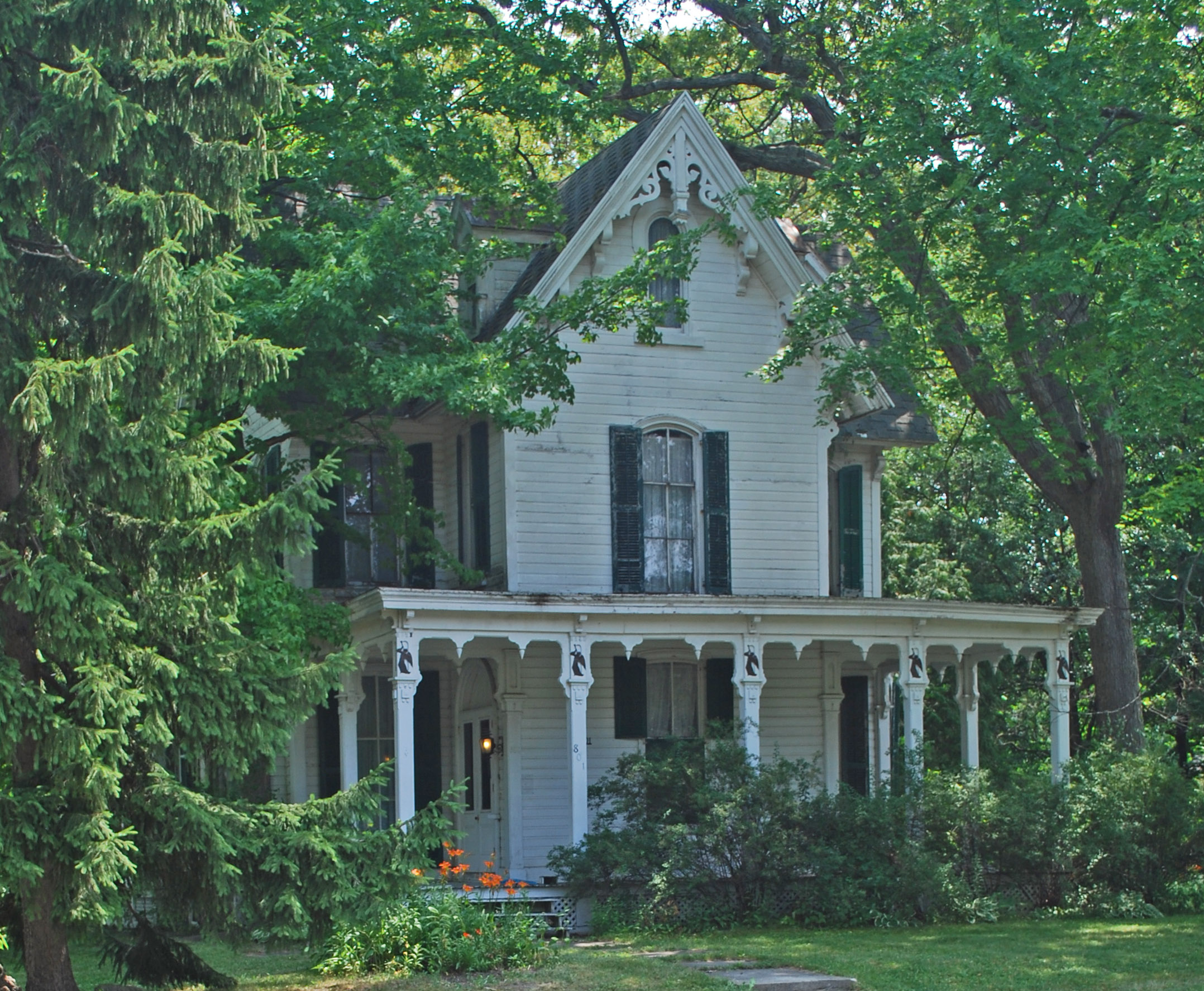
- Interactive map
- Location: 801 S. East St., Fenton, Michigan
- Coordinates: 42°47′16″N 83°42′04″W
- Area: less than one acre
- Built: 1867
- Architectural style: Late Gothic Revival
- MPS: Genesee County MRA
- NRHP reference No.: 82000532
- Added to NRHP: November 26, 1982

The Edwin Trump House is a single-family home located at 801 South East Street in Fenton, Michigan. It was listed on the National Register of Historic Places in 1982.

== History ==
Edwin Trump was the President of the Trump & Wilmot Bank. He built this house in 1867, reportedly as part of a contest between Trump and his partner, George Wilmot, to see who could build the most lavish home. In 1872, Trump traded the house to local attorney A. U. Wood for a business block in downtown Fenton.

== Description ==
The Edwin Trump House is a two-story, wood-framed Gothic Revival structure built in a T-shape with multiple gables and dormers. It has a decorative open porch, containing Gothic ornamentation in its bargeboards, which match the bargeboards in the eaves of the gables.
