= House at 4344 Frances Road =

- U.S. National Register of Historic Places
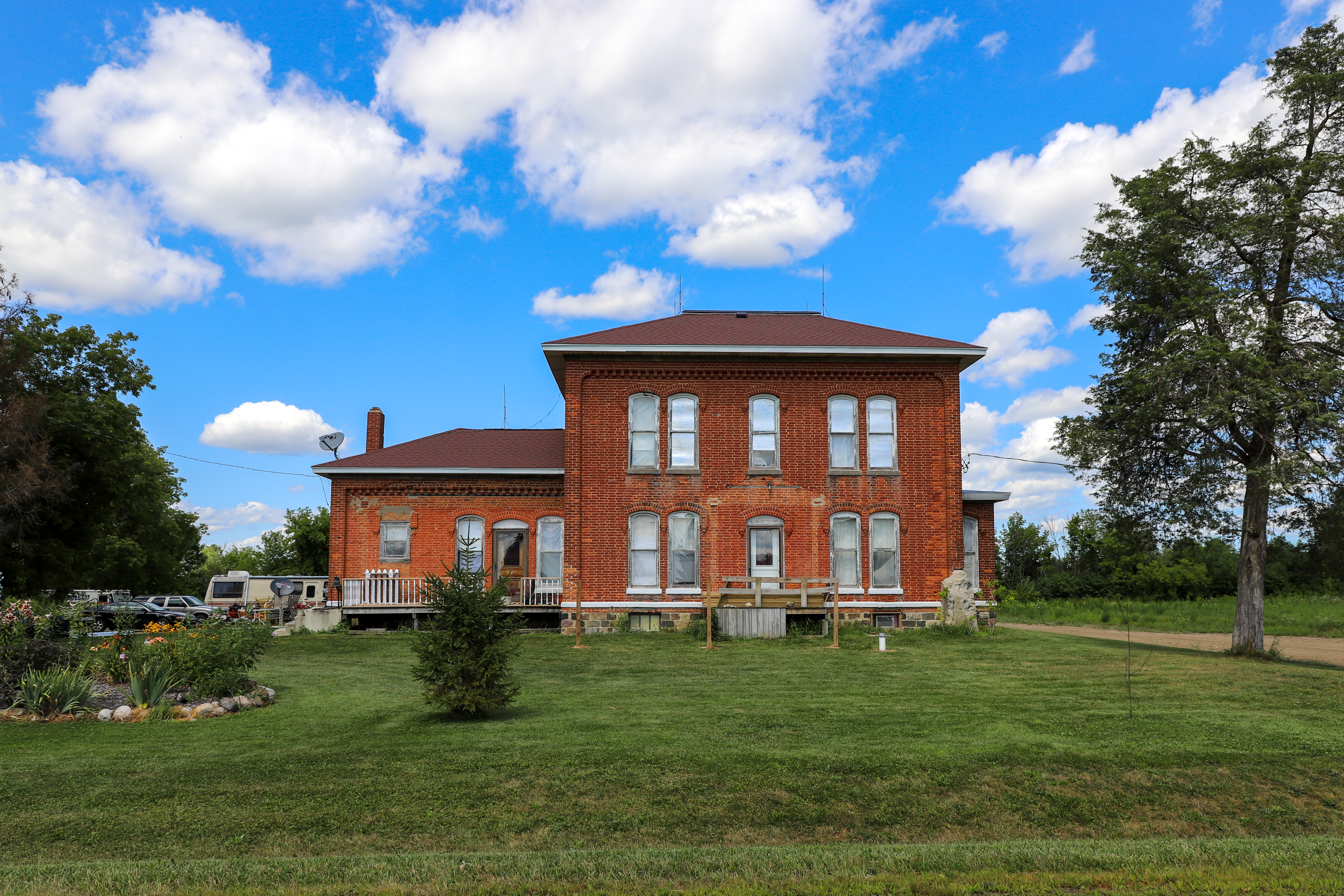
- House at 4344 Frances Road, Clio, Michigan.
- Interactive map
- Location: 4344 Frances Rd., Clio, Michigan
- Coordinates: 43°08′03″N 83°46′02″W
- Area: less than one acre
- Architectural style: Italianate
- MPS: Genesee County MRA
- NRHP reference No.: 82000517
- Added to NRHP: November 26, 1982

The House at 4344 Frances Road is a single-family home located in Clio, Michigan. It was listed on the National Register of Historic Places in 1982.

This house, constructed between approximately 1860 and 1875, is a two-story brick Italianate structure. It has a square floorplan with a small projecting bay to one side. The front facade has a one bay wide entrance porch supported with turned posts with brackets. The window placement is balanced, with rounded arch openings, stone sills, and an arched brick lintel. The house is topped with a corbeled cornice lines and a truncated hip roof.
