= House at 7066 Lobdell Road =

- U.S. National Register of Historic Places
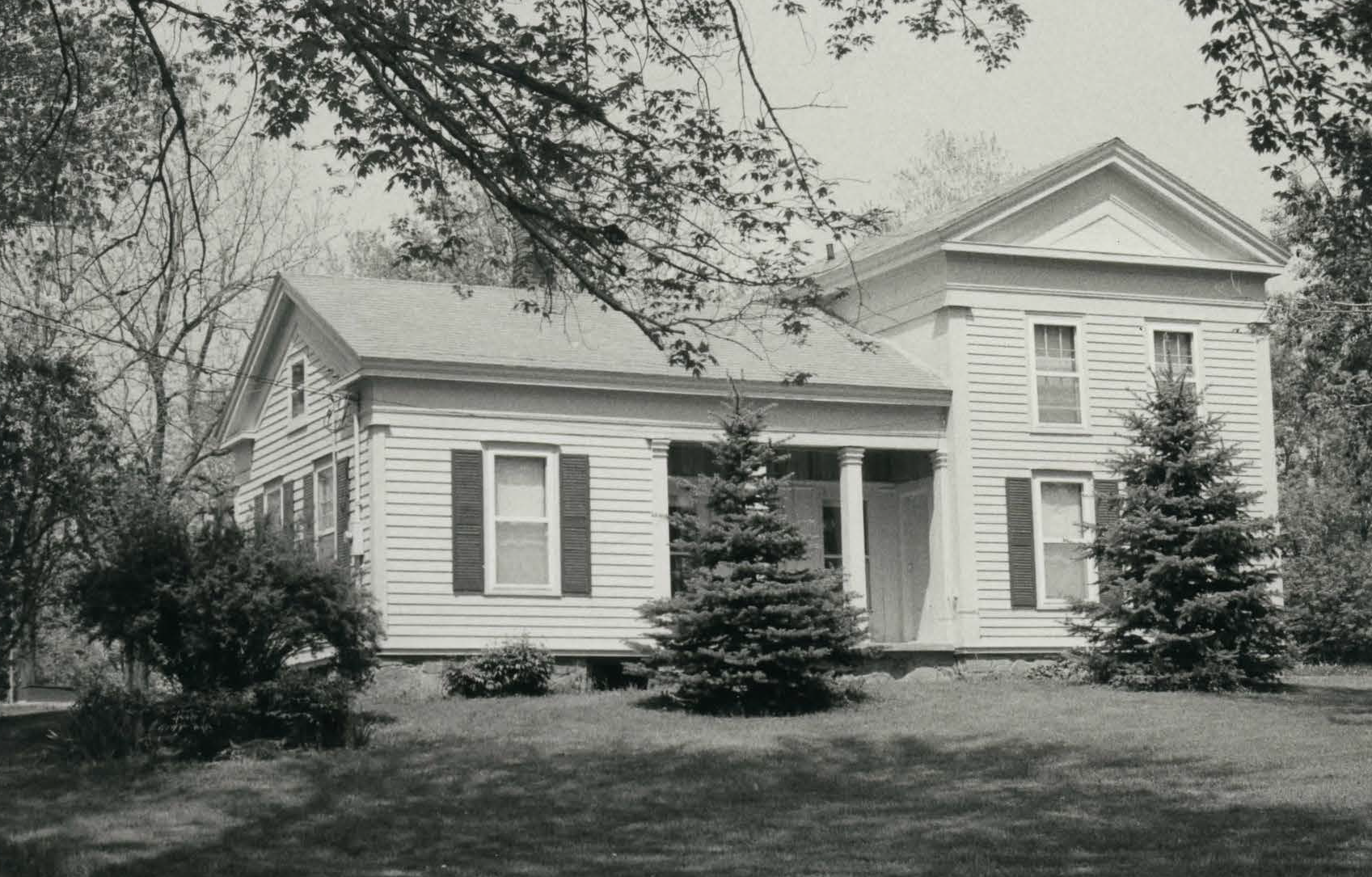
- Interactive map
- Location: 7066 Lobdell Rd., Linden, Michigan
- Coordinates: 42°47′29″N 83°48′28″W
- Area: less than one acre
- Architectural style: Greek Revival
- MPS: Genesee County MRA
- NRHP reference No.: 82000519
- Added to NRHP: November 26, 1982

The House at 7066 Lobdell Road is a single-family home located in Linden, Michigan. It was listed on the National Register of Historic Places in 1982.

This house is a Greek Revival structure whose unique design and fine craftsmanship make it an outstanding example of its architectural type. It is a frame structure in an L-shaped plan. The front facade has detailed corner pilasters and is topped with a fully pedimented gable and a wide frieze. A recessed porch fronts the wing of the house, and contains two entrances.
