= William Henry and Lucinda McCaslin Farm House =

- U.S. National Register of Historic Places
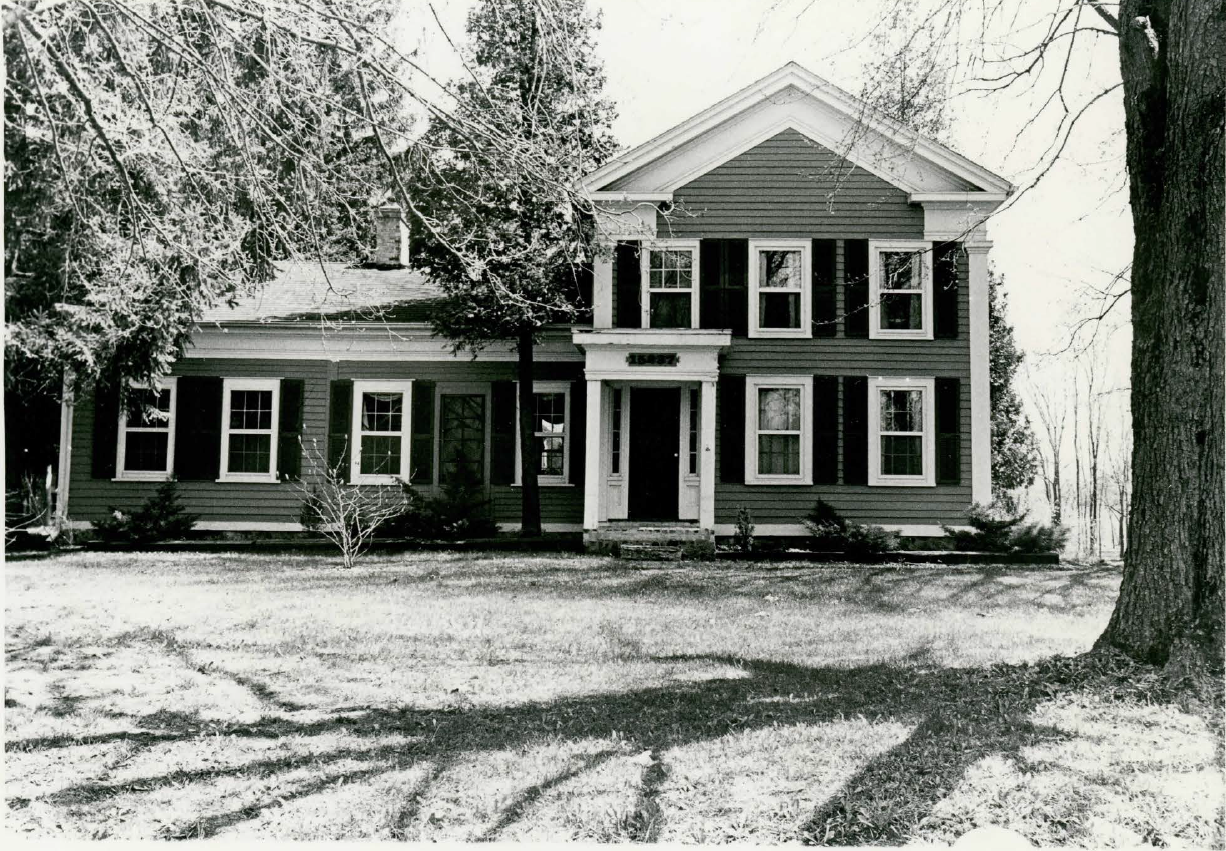
- Interactive map
- Location: 15237 McCaslin Lake Rd., Linden, Michigan
- Coordinates: 42°48′25″N 83°51′18″W
- Area: less than one acre
- Built: c. 1858
- Built by: Dick Gibbons
- Architectural style: Greek Revival
- MPS: Genesee County MRA
- NRHP reference No.: 82000523
- Added to NRHP: November 26, 1982

The William Henry and Lucinda McCaslin Farm House is a single-family home located at 15237 McCaslin Lake Road in Linden, Michigan. It was listed on the National Register of Historic Places in 1982.

== History ==
William Henry McCaslin was born in Cork County, Ireland and came to the United States in 1838, settling in this area of southeastern Genesee County. The lake near McCaslin's land is now known as McCaslin Lake. McCaslin had five children with his wife, Lucinda. In the 1850s, they began construction on a house on their property. However, William McCaslin died in 1858 by falling from a barn, and construction stalled. In 1861, Lucinda hired a contractor named Dick Gibbons for $1,000 to finish the home.

== Description ==
The William Henry and Lucinda McCaslin Farm House is a two-story frame structure built in an L-shaped configuration. The main section of the house is two stories high, and the attached ell is a single story. The front facade of the house has an entry door with a classical surround, symmetrical window openings, and corner pilasters. Both sections of the house have a wide frieze below the eavesline and boxed cornices with returns.
