= William Carmer House =

- U.S. National Register of Historic Places
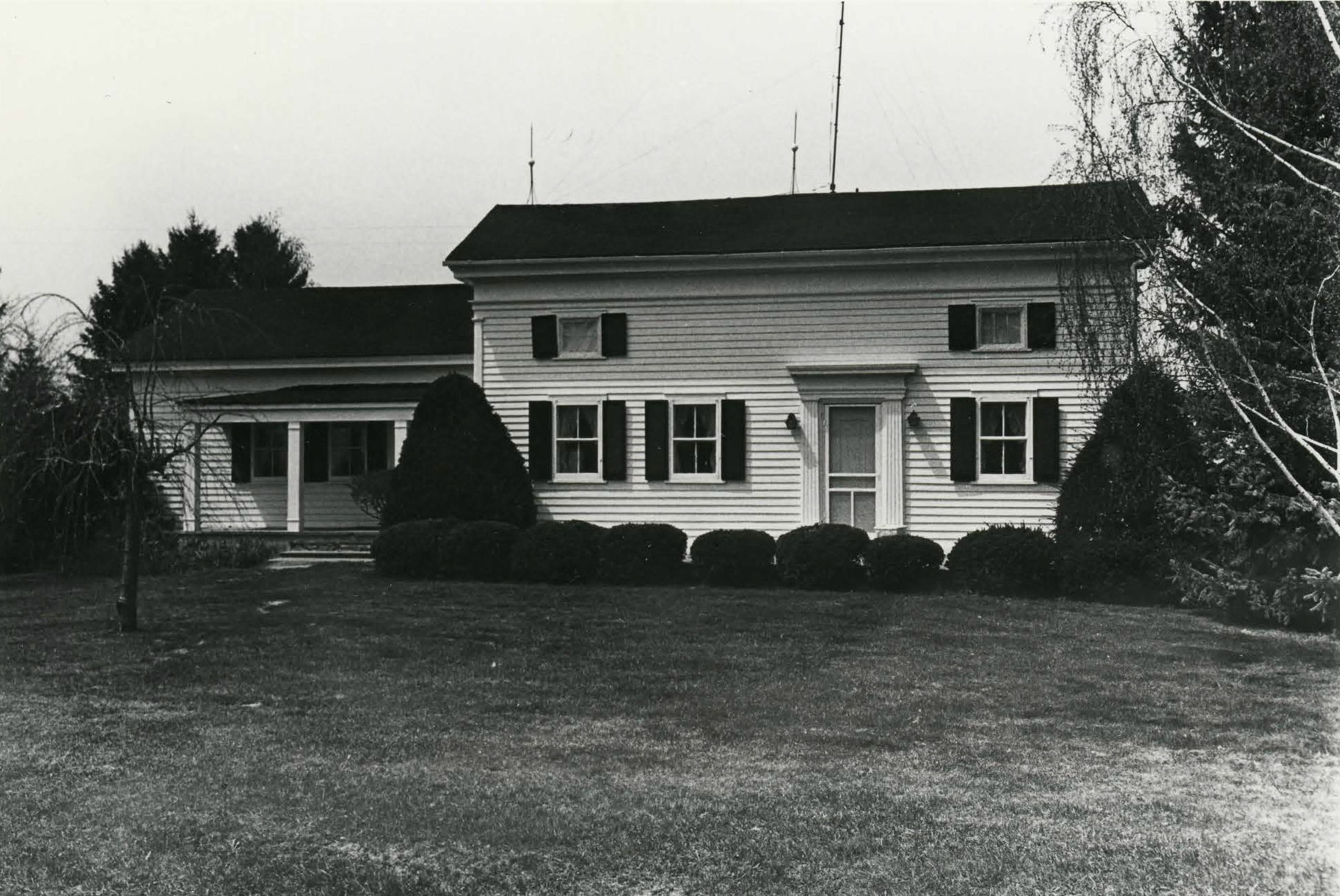
- Interactive map
- Location: 10448 Washburn Rd., Ortonville, Michigan
- Coordinates: 42°52′42″N 83°27′17″W
- Area: less than one acre
- Architectural style: Greek Revival
- MPS: Genesee County MRA
- NRHP reference No.: 82000504
- Added to NRHP: November 26, 1982

The William Carmer House is a single-family home located at 10448 Washburn Road in Ortonville, Michigan. It was listed on the National Register of Historic Places in 1982.

== History ==
William Carmer moved from Erie County, New York to this area in 1844. It is unclear when he constructed this house.

== Description ==
The William Carmer House consists of two rectangular masses: a small single-story section and a larger one-and-one-half-story section. The sections are joined at a corner, suggesting that the building was constructed in two stages. The larger section has Classical detailing such as the framed entrance, fluted corner pilasters, a wide frieze, and a cornice with returns.
