= Alexander McClew Farm House =

- U.S. National Register of Historic Places
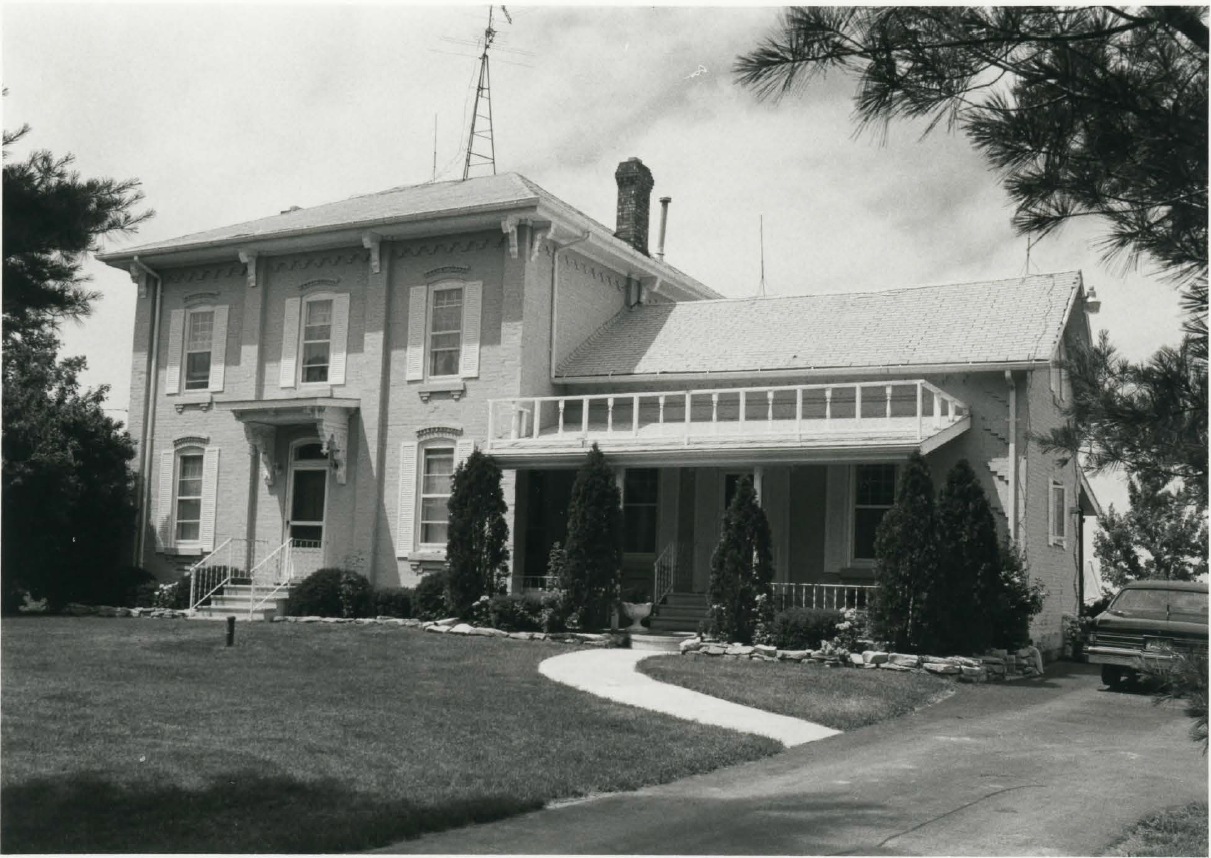
- Interactive map
- Location: 7115 Farrand Rd., Millington, Michigan
- Coordinates: 43°11′41″N 83°34′35″W
- Area: less than one acre
- Built: 1880
- Built by: Alexander McClew
- Architectural style: Italianate
- MPS: Genesee County MRA
- NRHP reference No.: 82000524
- Added to NRHP: November 26, 1982

The Alexander McClew Farm House is a single-family home located at 7115 Farrand Road in Millington, Michigan. It was listed on the National Register of Historic Places in 1982.

== History ==
Alexander McClew moved to this area in the 1870s, along with his wife, Mary. The couple settled into a wood house, but in 1880 McClew constructed this brick house. The size and style of the home was suited to the McClews' status as wealthy farmers.

== Description ==
The McClew Farm House is a two-story yellow brick Italianate structure, with a truncated hip roof supported by brackets. A 1-1/2 story rectangular gable-roofed wing is attached. The main section has a front facade divided into three recessed bays. The entryway is in the center bay, and contains an etched ruby glass transom and an overhang with elaborate bracketry. The window openings are symmetrically placed in the facade on both the first and second stories, and contain unusual projecting brick archways. This main section of the house has brick corbeling underneath the eaves. The wing is fronted by an open porch containing a central doorway with a window on each side. Brick corbeling ruins along the corner and eavesline.
