= Fenton Railroad Depot =

- U.S. National Register of Historic Places
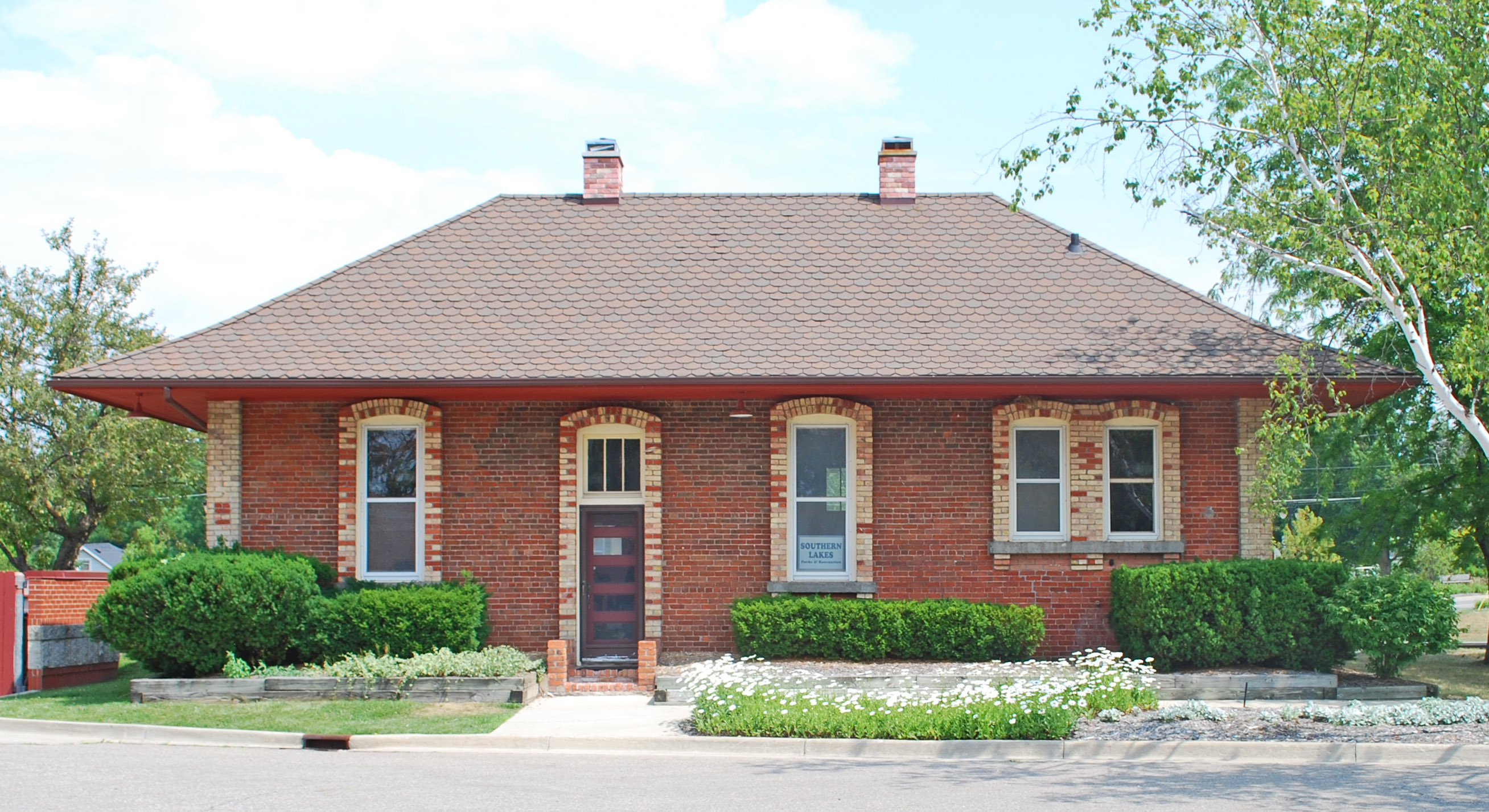
- Interactive map
- Location: 207 Silver Lake Rd., Fenton, Michigan
- Coordinates: 42°47′50″N 83°42′09″W
- Area: less than one acre
- Built: 1882
- MPS: Genesee County MRA
- NRHP reference No.: 83000843
- Added to NRHP: June 20, 1983

The Fenton Railroad Depot is a former railroad depot located at 207 Silver Lake Road in Fenton, Michigan. It was listed on the National Register of Historic Places in 1983.

== History ==
William Fenton and Robert Leroy founded Fentonville because they believed that a proposed railroad line though Michigan would run through the settlement, making Fentonville a shipping center for the surrounding area. In 1856 the Detroit, Grand Haven and Milwaukee Railway did indeed construct a line through the village, establishing the first railroad in the county. The original depot built in Fentonville was a wood-framed building on the north side of the tracks. Over time, Fenton experienced a spurt of growth due to the arrival of the railroad, and the area around the depot was developed with related businesses.

In about 1880, the wooden depot burned. In 1882, a new brick depot was constructed on the south side of the tracks. The brick to build the depot was reportedly shipped in from Saranac and Owosso. The new depot served as built until 1923, when it suffered a fire, destroying the roof. The roof was rebuilt to make the structure seen today.

The Fenton Depot served the railroad until 1974. After that time, it was purchased by the city of Fenton, and used by the city for various offices, including the Economic Development Office. As of 2015, it served as offices for Southern Lakes Parks & Recreation.

== Description ==
The Fenton Railroad Depot is a light yellow and red pressed brick structure. Originally built with a gable roof, the current hipped roof with flared eaves was added after the 1923 fire. The interior of the depot remains intact.
