= House at 1339 Cummings Road =

- U.S. National Register of Historic Places
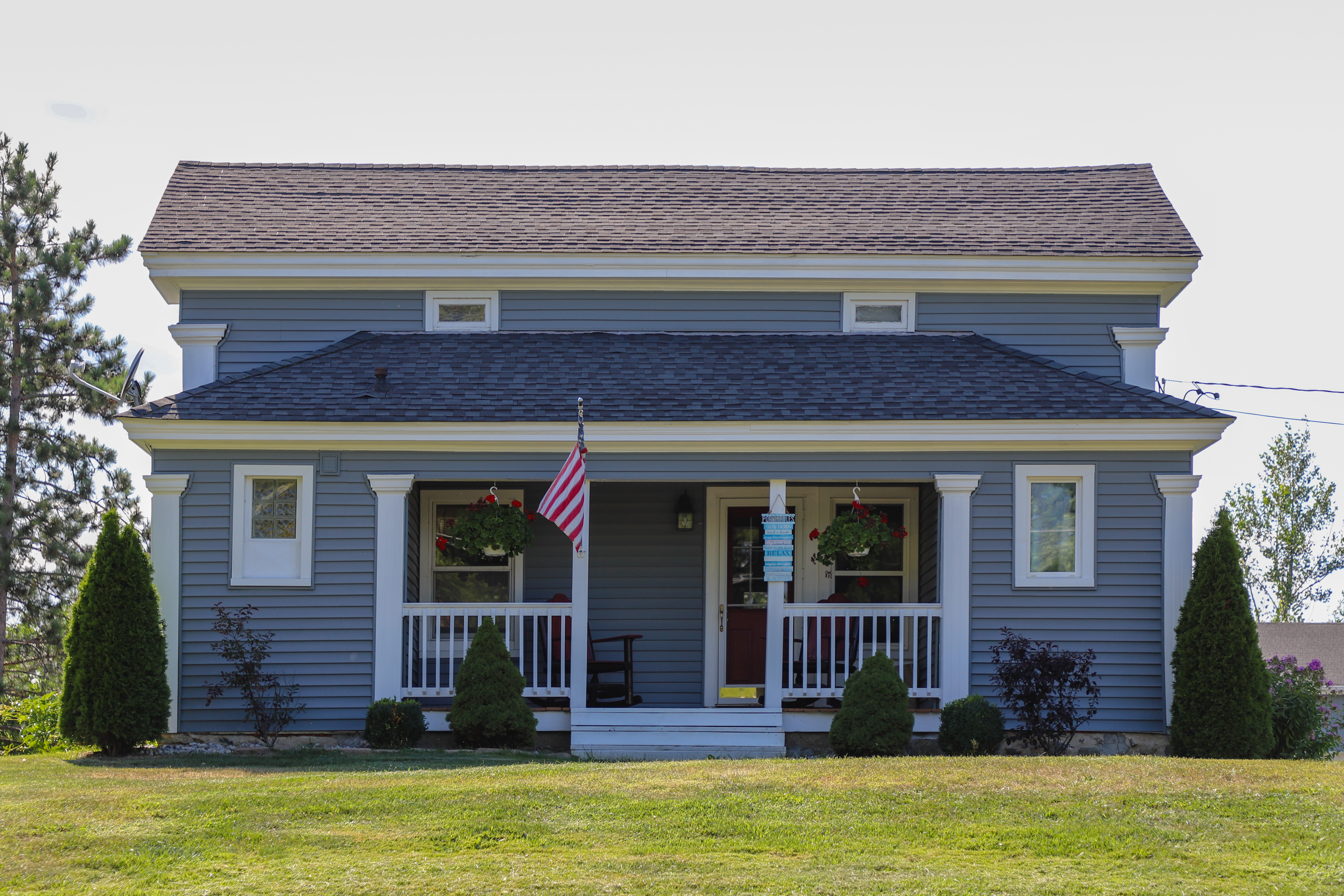
- Interactive map
- Location: 1339 Cummings Rd., Davison, Michigan
- Coordinates: 43°01′47″N 83°29′20″W
- Area: less than one acre
- Architectural style: Greek Revival
- MPS: Genesee County MRA
- NRHP reference No.: 82000515
- Added to NRHP: November 26, 1982

The House at 1339 Cummings Road is a single-family home located in Davison, Michigan. It was listed on the National Register of Historic Places in 1982.

This house was built some time between 1840 and 1860. It is a vernacular Greek Revival structure with an unusual three-part massing. The house consists of a 1 1/2-story rectangular mass with a one-story salt box addition at the rear and a hip roofed, single-story addition attached to the front facade. The front addition has corner pilasters, a recessed porch supported by turned uprights, and a simple entrance door in the porch. All three sections have a wide frieze and two have cornices with returns.
