= West Second Street–Swartz Creek Bridge =

- U.S. National Register of Historic Places
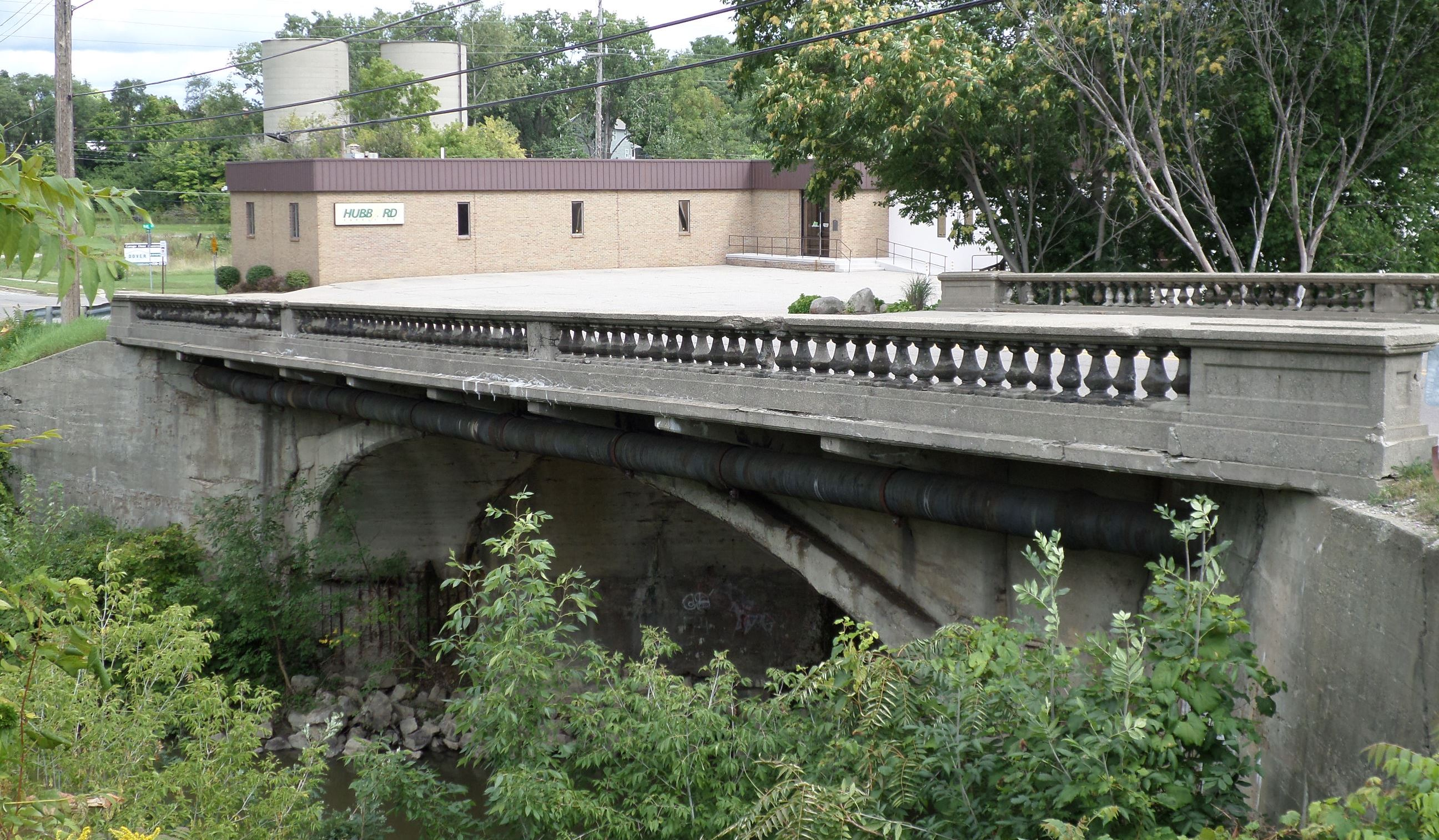
- The bridge in September 2014

- Location within Michigan
- Interactive map
- Location: West Second Street over Swartz Creek, Flint, Michigan
- Coordinates: 43°0′38″N 83°41′58″W
- Area: less than 1 acre (0.40 ha)
- Built: 1919
- Built by: Price Bros. Construction Co.
- Architect: Flint City Engineer's Office
- Architectural style: Luten arch bridge
- MPS: Highway Bridges of Michigan MPS
- NRHP reference No.: 99001512
- Added to NRHP: December 9, 1999

The West Second Street–Swartz Creek Bridge in Flint, Michigan, carries West Second Street over Swartz Creek. It was listed on the National Register of Historic Places in 1999.

== History ==
The West Second Street Bridge was engineered in 1919 by the Flint City Engineer's Office under a royalty agreement with Daniel B. Luten, where the bridge utilized Luten's patented arch design. The Illinois Bridge Company of Chicago, a licensee for Luten, provided design assistance. The city solicited bids to construct the bridge, and awarded the construction contract to Price Brothers Construction Company of Lansing, Michigan, which underbid the Illinois Bridge Company. Work started on the bridge in the summer of 1919, and was completed in early 1920. It has continued to carry vehicular traffic since.

== Description ==
The West Second Street Bridge is a 70-foot Luten arch bridge. The roadway is asphalt, flanked by cantilevered concrete sidewalks. The bridge is heavily skewed across the creek. Massive concrete abutments support the elliptical filled arch. It has a corbeled arch ring, and cast concrete balusters lining the bridge.
