= List of Michigan State Historic Sites in Genesee County =

Location of Genesee County in Michigan

The following is a list of Michigan State Historic Sites in Genesee County, Michigan. Sites marked with a dagger (†) are also listed on the National Register of Historic Places in Genesee County, Michigan.

== Current listings ==
Name	Image	Location	City	Listing date
Robert P. Aitken Farm House†		1110 North Linden Road	Flint Township	October 27, 1983
Applewood†		1400 East Kearsley Street	Flint	January 29, 1979
Argentine Cemetery		8000 Block of Silver Lake Road	Argentine Township	April 25, 1988
Argentine Mill		8572 Silver Lake Road	Argentine Township	April 25, 1988
Atlas Mill		G-6140 Bray Road	Crossroads Village	October 17, 1974
Berston Field House		3300 Saginaw Street	Flint	May 3, 1994
Brent Creek Methodist Protestant Church		10412 West Mount Morris Road	Brent Creek vicinity	March 16, 1981
Buick Motor Company Commemorative Designation		Buick Motor Division Headquarters, 902 East Hamilton	Flint	October 21, 1993
Capitol Theatre Building†		140 Second Street	Flint	August 24, 1984
City Ice and Fuel Company Office (Demolished)		2061 South Saginaw Street	Flint	June 15, 1979
Civic Park Historic District†		Generally bounded by Dartmouth, Lawndale, Rankin, Dupont, Welch, Brownell, Dayton, Trumbull	Flint	May 13, 1981
Clio Depot†		300–308 West Vienna Road	Clio	April 4, 1978
Community Presbyterian Church		2505 North Chevrolet Avenue	Flint	May 13, 1981
Congregational Church of Grand Blanc		203 East Grand Blanc Road	Grand Blanc	July 17, 1981
Crapo Farm		Off of Hill Road, just west of the Swartz Creek city limits	Swartz Creek	November 15, 1973
Henry Howland Crapo / Willson Park Informational Designation		Willson Park, northeast corner of East First Street and Wallenberg Street	Flint	May 8, 1986
John West Davison Farmstead		3305 East Hill Road	Grand Blanc	January 20, 1984
Dibbleville		Northwest corner of South Leroy Street and West Shiawassee Avenue	Fenton	1977
Durant Garage		116 West Fourth Street	Flint	August 15, 1975
Durant-Dort Carriage Factory No. 4 / The Flint Soap Works (Building burned down)		212 North Grand Traverse Street	Flint	March 19, 1987
William C. Durant / Durant-Dort Carriage Company		316 West Water Street	Flint	1978
Sarah Emma Edmonds Informational Designation		Genesee County Courthouse Grounds	Flint	June 15, 1992
Elks Lodge Building†		142 Second Street	Flint	November 3, 1976
Fenton Downtown Historic District (Demolished; NR delisted, 1975)		Bounded by West Silver Lake Road, East Ellen Street, South Walnut Street, and River Street	Fenton	January 21, 1974
Fenton Grain Elevator†		234 North Leroy Street	Fenton	April 24, 1979
Fenton House† (also called the Fenton Hotel; now a restaurant)		302 North Leroy Street	Fenton	December 10, 1971
Fenton Old Town Historic District†		Roughly bounded by Mill Street, South Leroy Street, East Elizabeth Street, West Shiawassee Avenue, and South Adelaide Street	Fenton	January 16, 1976
Fenton United Methodist Church		119 South Leroy Street	Fenton	March 19, 1987
First Baptist Church†		6106 South Saginaw Road	Grand Blanc	July 26, 1975
First Methodist Episcopal Church		225 West Court Street	Flint	September 10, 1979
First Methodist Episcopal Church Informational Site		413 East Main Street	Flushing	September 24, 1992
First National Bank and Trust Company Building†		460 South Saginaw Street	Flint	October 2, 1980
First United Methodist Church		808 Genesee Street, SE corner of Church Street	Mount Morris	August 21, 1987
Flint Masonic Temple		755 South Saginaw Street	Flint	April 24, 1981
Flint Road Cart Factory - Durant-Dort Carriage Factory No. 1		301–311 Water Street	Flint	March 19, 1987
Flint Sit-Down Strike of 1936–37 Informational Site		Three markers erected: 4300 South Saginaw; South Chevrolet Avenue; 300 block of South Chevrolet Avenue	Flint	February 7, 1977
Flushing Community Center		390 East Main Street	Flushing	July 17, 1975
Fourth Ward Evangelical Church		1213 West Second Street	Flint	June 10, 1980
Genesee County Courthouse and Jail†		920 South Saginaw Street	Flint	September 7, 1989
Horace Gilbert/Morgan and Enos Miller House†		5023 Holland Drive	Swartz Creek	February 26, 1985
Glenwood Cemetery†		2500 West Court Street, between Barlett Place and Forest Avenue	Flint	January 21, 1988
Harrison Homestead		1570 Main Street	Flushing	May 17, 1973
Industrial Mutual Association Auditorium (NR delisted 1997)		815 Second Avenue	Flint	March 20, 1984
Morris A. Knight House†		1105 Church Street	Flint	November 16, 1982
Linden Downtown Historic District		Vicinity of intersection of Broad and Bridge streets	Linden	August 12, 1977
Linden Grist Mill†		201 North Main Street	Linden	October 29, 1971
Linden Presbyterian Church Informational Site		119 West Broad Street	Linden	August 22, 1985
Mason's Tavern		7500 Fenton Road, near SE corner of Grand Blanc Road	Mundy Township	November 30, 1983
McLean House		2113 Vienna Road	Clio	November 7, 1977
Methodist Episcopal Church of Montrose Informational Site		158 East State Street	Montrose	October 15, 1992
Miller Opera House			Crossroads Village	July 26, 1974
Fredrick Miner House		1000 East Seventh Street	Flint	March 19, 1980
James H. Murray House†		7232 Silver Lake Road	Linden	September 17, 1981
Charles W. Nash House		307 Mason	Flint	March 19, 1987
Oak Park Methodist Episcopal Church		2125 North Saginaw Street	Flint	August 20, 1992
Old Calvary Cemetery		G-1124 Ballenger Hwy	Flint	August 29, 1996
Old Prospect Hill Cemetery		End of South Davis Street	Fenton	July 15, 1999
Daniel O'Sullivan House/Halfway House†		G-5035 Flushing Road	Flushing	December 14, 1976
William A. Paterson Factory Complex†		118 East Third Street	Flint	February 23, 1981
William S. Paterson/Dr. James K. Sutherland House		402 East Third Street	Flint	November 20, 1987
William Ray Perry House		6025 Perry Road	Grand Blanc	September 7, 1989
Quinn Chapel African Methodist Episcopal Church Commemorative Designation		2101 Lippincott Blvd at the intersection of McPhail	Flint	September 28, 2000
Saint Jude's Episcopal Church		106 Elizabeth Street	Fenton	June 5, 1997
Saint Michael Roman Catholic Church		609 East Fifth Avenue	Flint	January 21, 1988
Saint Paul's Episcopal Church		711 South Saginaw Street	Flint	December 18, 1974
Smith Hill Cemetery		10082 North State Street	Forest Township	June 21, 1990
Jacob Smith/Fred A. Aldrich Informational Site		221 West First Avenue	Flint	March 19, 1987
Superintendent's Cottage†		1301 Court Street	Flint	November 15, 1973
Swartz Creek Cemetery		4464 Morrish Road	Swartz Creek	January 17, 1986
E. S. Swayze Drugstore†		107 East Main Street	Otisville	2010
Thetford Township Hall		11499 North Center Road	Clio	October 27, 1984
Toledo, Saginaw and Mackinaw Railroad Flushing Depot		431 Main Street	Flushing	June 15, 1979
Charles A. Uptegraff House		311 North State Street	Davison	January 17, 1991
Christopher B. Uptegraff House		317–319 North State Street	Davison	January 17, 1991
Vehicle City Informational Designation		Flint City Hall, 1101 South Saginaw	Flint	February 19, 1958
Voiture 1116 - 40 et 8		G-3255 East Mount Morris Road	Mount Morris	May 8, 1984
West Forest United Methodist Church		Northeast corner of Farrand and Taylor roads	Otisville vicinity	March 19, 1980
Robert J. Whaley House†		624 Kearsley Street	Flint	February 7, 1977
George W. Wilmot House		501 South East Street	Fenton	October 27, 1983
Amos M. Woodruff House		311 East River Road	Flushing	January 17, 1991

== See also ==
- National Register of Historic Places listings in Genesee County, Michigan

== Sources ==
- Historic Sites Online – Genesee County. Michigan State Housing Developmental Authority. Accessed January 14, 2011.
