= Lake Fenton =

Lake Fenton may refer to a location in the United States:

- Lake Fenton (Michigan), a lake
  - Lake Fenton, Michigan, a community adjacent to the lake
  - Lake Fenton High School

== See also ==
- Fenton Lake (disambiguation)
