= Argentine, Michigan =

- Census-designated place (CDP) & unincorporated community
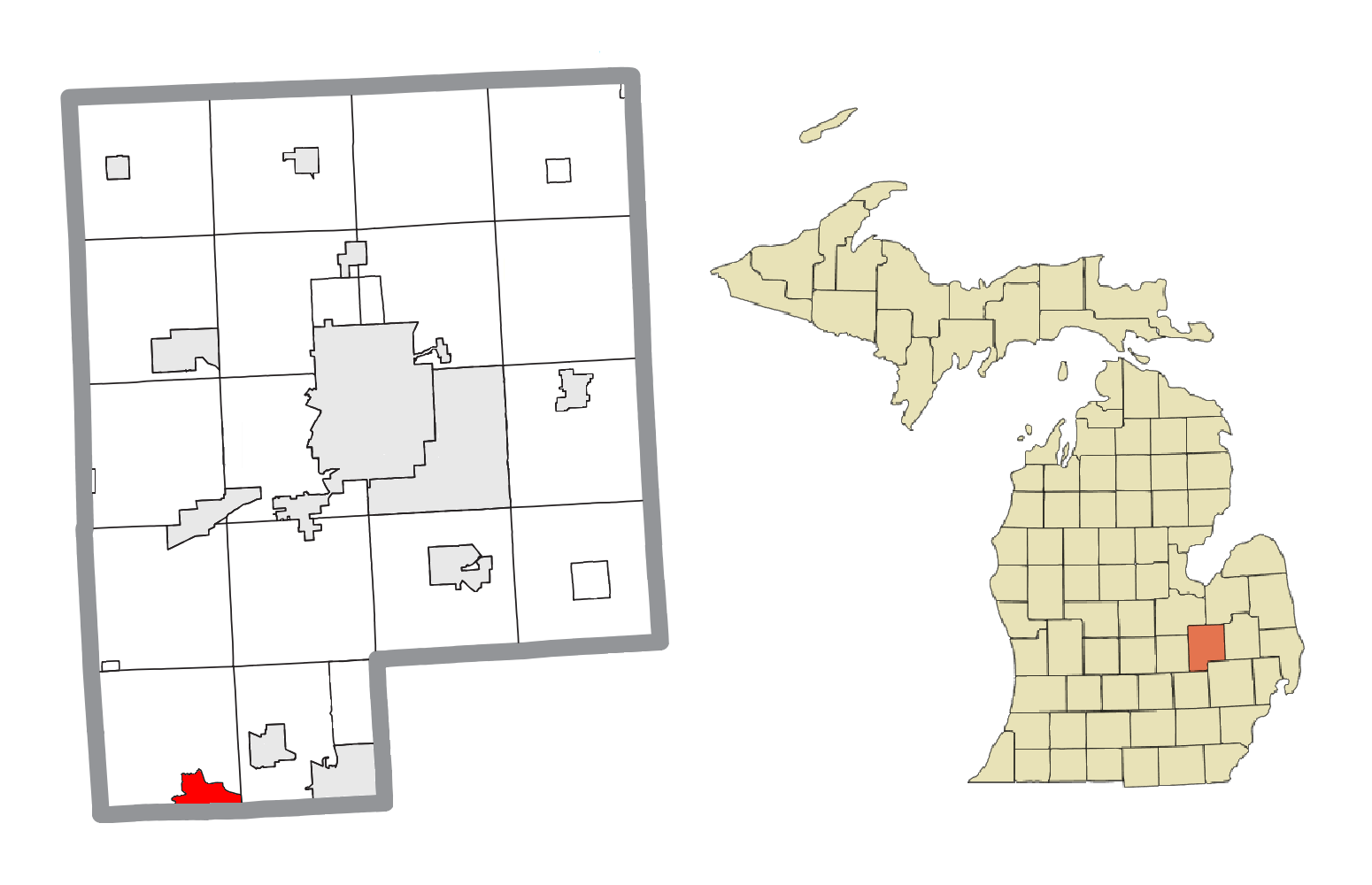
- Location within Genesee County

- Location within the state of Michigan Argentine (the United States)
- Coordinates: 42°47′29″N 83°50′45″W
- Country: United States
- State: Michigan
- County: Genesee
- Township: Argentine
- Settled: 1836

Area
  - Total: 3.28 sq mi (8.49 km^{2})
  - Land: 2.37 sq mi (6.13 km^{2})
  - Water: 0.91 sq mi (2.35 km^{2}) 27.73%
- Elevation: 873 ft (266 m)

Population (2020)
  - Total: 2,685
  - Density: 1,134/sq mi (437.8/km^{2})
- Time zone: UTC-5 (Eastern (EST))
  - Summer (DST): UTC-4 (EDT)
- ZIP code(s): 48451 (Linden)
- Area code: 810
- FIPS code: 26-03400
- GNIS feature ID: 2393318

Argentine is an unincorporated community and census-designated place (CDP) in Argentine Township, Genesee County, in the U.S. state of Michigan. The population was 2,685 as of the 2020 census, up from 2,525 at the 2010 census. It was first settled in 1836

The area included in the CDP is the southeast corner of Argentine Township. The city of Linden is to the east, and the Linden ZIP code 48451 also serves Argentine.

== History ==
The first settlers, Jame H. Murray and William Lobdell, arrived in 1836. A post office, "Booton", was opened on November 1, 1837, with Murray as the first postmaster. The post office was renamed "Argentine" on March 30, 1842, due to a similarly named post office. The 'silver-plated' name is related to the discovery of valuable minerals (not silver) in the area. The community was platted by Dr. Isaac Wixom in 1844. It was once called the 'smallest town in Michigan.' The lack of a railroad connection impeded its growth.

== Geography ==
Argentine is in southern Genesee County, in the southeast corner of Argentine Township. The CDP extends east to the border of Fenton Charter Township, and the southern edge of the CDP follows the Genesee–Livingston County line. The CDP includes the Genesee County portion of Lobdell Lake and its surroundings, and extends west to include Murray Lake and north to the Shiawassee River. The center of the community is at the intersection of Silver Lake Road and South Seymour Road, at the northwest end of Lobdell Lake. Silver Lake Road leads northeast 4 miles (6 km) to Linden and northwest 6 miles (10 km) to Byron, while South Seymour Road leads south into Livingston County, where it becomes Argentine Road.

According to the United States Census Bureau, the Argentine CDP has a total area of 3.3 square miles (8.5 km^{2}), of which 2.4 square miles (6.1 km^{2}) is land and 0.93 square miles (2.4 km^{2}), or 27.73%, is water.

== Demographics ==
Historical population
Census	Pop.	Note	%±
2000	2,285		—
2010	2,525		10.5%
2020	2,685		6.3%
U.S. Decennial Census

=== 2020 census ===
As of the 2020 census, Argentine had a population of 2,685. The median age was 46.5 years. 19.0% of residents were under the age of 18 and 18.7% of residents were 65 years of age or older. For every 100 females there were 105.7 males, and for every 100 females age 18 and over there were 103.9 males age 18 and over.

100.0% of residents lived in urban areas, while 0.0% lived in rural areas.

There were 1,024 households in Argentine, of which 28.7% had children under the age of 18 living in them. Of all households, 58.1% were married-couple households, 19.2% were households with a male householder and no spouse or partner present, and 15.8% were households with a female householder and no spouse or partner present. About 22.2% of all households were made up of individuals and 6.8% had someone living alone who was 65 years of age or older.

There were 1,174 housing units, of which 12.8% were vacant. The homeowner vacancy rate was 1.6% and the rental vacancy rate was 8.5%.

Racial composition as of the 2020 census
Race	Number	Percent
White	2,481	92.4%
Black or African American	7	0.3%
American Indian and Alaska Native	3	0.1%
Asian	6	0.2%
Native Hawaiian and Other Pacific Islander	0	0.0%
Some other race	9	0.3%
Two or more races	179	6.7%
Hispanic or Latino (of any race)	70	2.6%

=== 2000 census ===
As of the census of 2000, there were 2,285 people, 843 households, and 638 families residing in the CDP. The population density was 920.7 inhabitants per square mile (355.5/km^{2}). There were 964 housing units at an average density of 388.4 per square mile (150.0/km^{2}). The racial makeup of the CDP was 96.72% White, 0.26% Black or African American, 0.83% Native American, 0.13% Asian, 0.31% from other races, and 1.75% from two or more races. Hispanic or Latino of any race were 1.53% of the population.

There were 843 households, out of which 38.9% had children under the age of 18 living with them, 63.0% were married couples living together, 8.8% had a female householder with no husband present, and 24.3% were non-families. 18.5% of all households were made up of individuals, and 3.3% had someone living alone who was 65 years of age or older. The average household size was 2.64 and the average family size was 3.04.

In the CDP, the population was spread out, with 26.5% under the age of 18, 7.1% from 18 to 24, 33.0% from 25 to 44, 24.1% from 45 to 64, and 9.3% who were 65 years of age or older. The median age was 37 years. For every 100 females, there were 105.9 males. For every 100 females age 18 and over, there were 102.5 males.

The median income for a household in the CDP was $61,675, and the median income for a family was $71,875. Males had a median income of $56,146 versus $31,864 for females. The per capita income for the CDP was $26,145. About 2.0% of families and 2.2% of the population were below the poverty line, including 3.1% of those under age 18 and none of those age 65 or over.
