= Fenton High School =

Fenton High School may refer to:

- Fenton High School (Illinois), Bensenville, Illinois
- Fenton High School (Michigan), Fenton, Michigan
- Lake Fenton High School, Lake Fenton, Michigan
