= Abraham Middlesworth =

American politician

Member of the Michigan House of Representatives from the Genesee County 2nd district
- In office January 1, 1855 – December 31, 1856
- Preceded by: Elbridge E. Gale
- Succeeded by: Reuben Goodrich

Personal details
- Party: Whig

Abraham Middlesworth was an American politician in Michigan.

Middlesworth was a Whig. On November 8, 1854, Middlesworth was elected to the Michigan House of Representatives where he represented the Genesee County 2nd district from January 3, 1855 to December 31, 1856. Middlesworth resided in the city of Argentine, Michigan at the time of his election. During his single term in the legislature, he served on his chamber's Election Committee.
