= Lakeside, Michigan =

Lakeside may refer to the following places in the U.S. state of Michigan:

- Lakeside, Berrien County, Michigan
- Lakeside, Genesee County, Michigan
- Lakeside, Macomb County, Michigan
