= Bridge Street-Broad Street Historic District =

- U.S. National Register of Historic Places
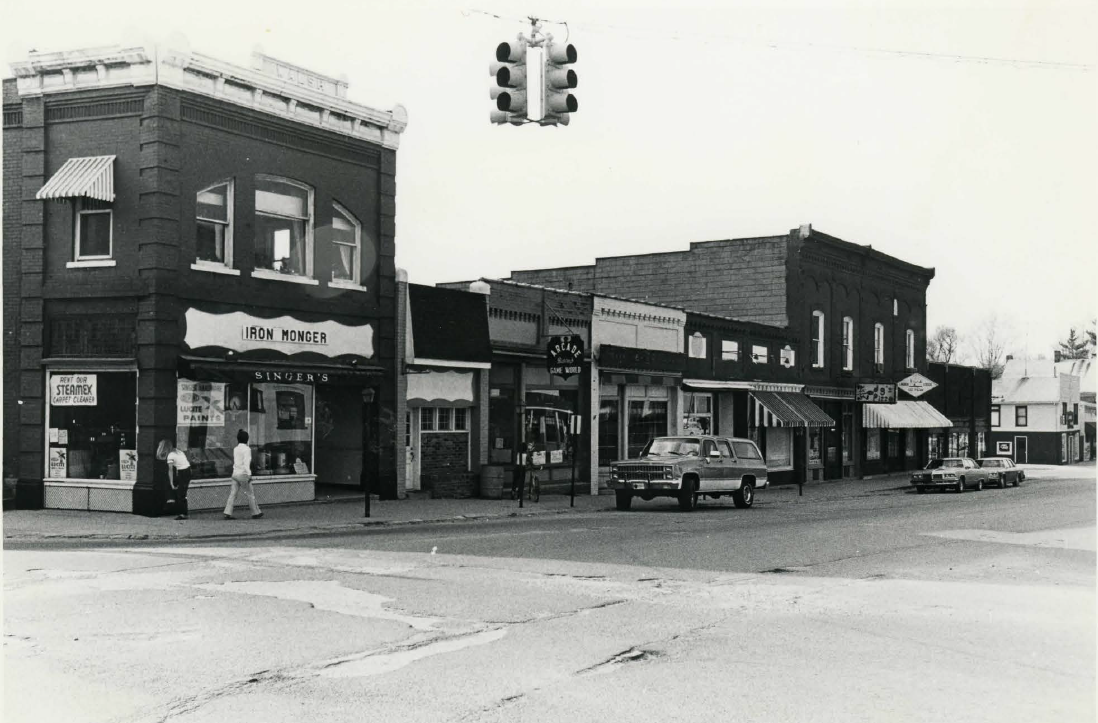
- Bridge Street south, at Broad
- Interactive map
- Location: 3 Central blocks of Broad St., 2 blocks Bridge St., Linden, Michigan
- Coordinates: 42°48′53″N 83°46′53″W
- Area: 35 acres (14 ha)
- Built: 1873
- Architectural style: Greek Revival, Italianate
- MPS: Genesee County MRA
- NRHP reference No.: 82000502
- Added to NRHP: November 26, 1982

The Bridge Street-Broad Street Historic District is a primarily commercial historic district located along three central blocks of Broad Street and two intersecting blocks of Bridge Street in Linden, Michigan. It was listed on the National Register of Historic Places in 1982.

== History ==
The first development in what is now Linden was the construction of a dam in the early 1830s. In 1837, a bridge and tavern were constructed in what is now the historic district. By 1840, the town had two mills, a hotel, and other commercial structures. In about 1845 the mills burned, and new mills, including what is now the Linden Mill, were built. Manufacturers moved in during the 1850s, and the commercial section of Linden prospered. The first brick building appeared in 1865, and a bank in 1871. It was not until the 1800s, however, that the downtown development hit high gear. The number of commercial buildings in the downtown tripled between 1880 and 1890, with street lamps and sidewalks added in the early 1890s.

Unfortunately, Linden was hard hit by the Great Depression, losing nearly all of the industry in the area. The village never regained the economic strength it had had in the late 1800s and early 1900s. The streetscapes in the district remained much as they were until the turn of the 21st century. In 2007, a fire broke out in the Union Block on the corner of Broad and Bridge, and the building was eventually razed.

== Description ==
The Bridge Street-Broad Street Historic District contains 43 primarily commercial buildings, of which 35 contribute to the historic character of the neighborhood. Most of the buildings were built between 1850 and 1925. The district is primarily commercial in nature, with a majority of the buildings being brick Italianate commercial blocks. However, there are also ten wood frame residential structures of Greek Revival or Queen Anne styling. In addition, there are two former residential structures that have been converted to commercial use, two churches, the village hall, the Board of Education Building, and the former Linden Mill, now converted into the village library.
