= Fenton Lake =

Fenton Lake may refer to:

- Fenton Lake (Nova Scotia), a lake in Nova Scotia
- Fenton Lake State Park in New Mexico
- Lake Fenton (disambiguation)
- Glacial Fenton Lake was in the eastern basin of Lake Superior during the Wisconsin Ice Age.
