= Lake Fenton (Michigan) =

Lake in the state of Michigan, United States

- Location within Michigan
- Location: Genesee County, Michigan
- Coordinates: 42°50′05″N 083°42′55″W
- Basin countries: United States
- Surface area: 845 acres (342 ha)
- Max. depth: 92 ft (28 m)
- Surface elevation: 873 ft (266 m)

Lake Fenton is a lake in Fenton Charter Township, Genesee County in the U.S. state of Michigan.

The census-designated place Lake Fenton is named for the lake, which was also known as Long Lake.

== See also ==
- List of lakes in Michigan
