= Lake Fenton High School =

High school located in Linden, Michigan

Location
- 4070 Lahring Road; Linden, Michigan 48451; United States
- Coordinates: 42°50′36″N 83°45′01″W

Information
- Type: Public secondary school
- School district: Lake Fenton Community Schools
- Principal: Kate VanHouten
- Teaching staff: 34.45 (on an FTE basis)
- Grades: 9-12
- Enrollment: 677 (2023-2024)
- Student to teacher ratio: 19.65
- Colors: Royal blue and white
- Athletics conference: Flint Metro League
- Nickname: Blue Devils
- Website: www.lakefentonschools.org/o/lake-fenton-high-school

Student assessments
- 2021–22 school year Change vs. prior year

M-STEP 11th grade proficiency rates (Science / Social Studies)
- Advanced %: 13.9 / 13.9
- Proficient %: 23.8 / 28.5
- PR. Proficient %: 22.5 / 48.3
- Not Proficient %: 39.7 / 9.3

Average test scores
- SAT Total: 995.6 (▼ −2.9)

Lake Fenton High School is a high school located in Linden, Michigan. It is the only high school in the Lake Fenton Community Schools school district.

== History ==
Lake Fenton Community Schools was one of the last school districts in Genesee County to be consolidated in its current form (but not the last—see Carman-Ainsworth Community Schools), and the last consolidated school district in that county to have a high school of its own. The Lake Fenton Community School was built in 1956 to replace several one-room schools in Fenton Township. The plan called for a grade to be added each year until serving Kindergarten through 12th grade. The addition of the high school grades became possible in 1959 with the construction of a high school wing to the building on 11425 Torrey Road.

The most gradual change to the Lake Fenton Community School was the construction of a separate school building for Kindergarten through 6th grades, which came in the late 1960s with the opening of the West Shore Elementary/Torrey Hill Middle School complex. Lake Fenton High School now served 7th through 12th grades. The school became overcrowded again in the 2000s and in 2004, the current high school on Lahring Road, which carries a Linden mailing address, opened. The 1956 Lake Fenton Community School is today Lake Fenton Middle School, serving 6th through 8th grades.

== Demographics ==
The demographic breakdown of the 670 students enrolled for school year 2020-21 was:

- Female - 48.8%
- Native American/Alaskan - 0.4%
- Black - 0.7%
- White - 93.2%
- Male - 51.2%
- Asian - 0.4%
- Hispanic - 2.8%
- Multiracial - 2.5%

21.8% of the students were eligible for free or reduced-cost lunch.

== Athletics ==
The Lake Fenton Blue Devils compete in the Flint Metro League. School colors are royal blue and white. The following Michigan High School Athletic Association (MHSAA) sanctioned sports are offered:

- Baseball (boys)
- Basketball (girls and boys)
- Competitive cheer (girls)
- Cross country (girls and boys)
- Football (boys)
- Golf (girls and boys)
  - Boys state champion - 1994, 1995
- Gymnastics (girls)
- Lacrosse (girls and boys)
- Skiing (girls and boys)
- Soccer (girls and boys)
- Softball (girls)
  - State champion - 1995
- Swim and dive (girls and boys)
- Track and field (girls and boys)
- Volleyball (girls)
  - State champion - 1998
- Wrestling (boys)
