= James H. Murray House =

- U.S. National Register of Historic Places
- Michigan State Historic Site
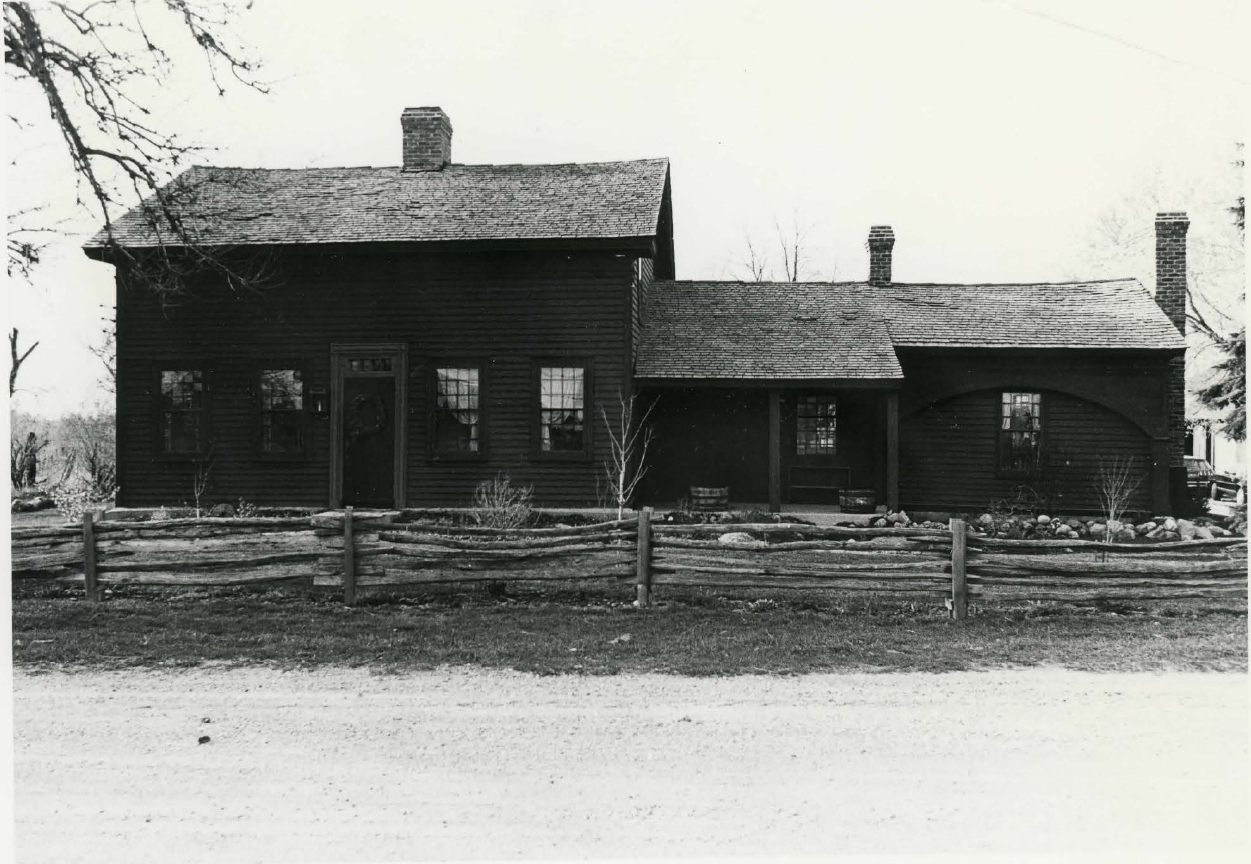
- Interactive map
- Location: 7232 Silver Lake Rd., Linden, Michigan
- Coordinates: 42°48′39″N 83°48′52″W
- Area: less than one acre
- Built: 1823
- Built by: Philemon C. Murray
- Architectural style: Greek Revival
- MPS: Genesee County MRA
- NRHP reference No.: 82000526
- Added to NRHP: November 26, 1982

The James H. Murray House is a single-family home located at 7232 Silver Lake Road in Linden, Michigan. It was listed on the National Register of Historic Places in 1982.

== History ==
James H. Murray moved from New York State to Washtenaw County, Michigan in 1830. In 1836, he moved to this area of Genesee County. Upon arrival, he settled his family in this house. The house itself was constructed some time between 1823 and 1835 by Philemon C. Murray, who was likely James' father. Philemon Murray deeded the house to James in 1836. After his arrival, James H. Murray constructed the area's first dam, sawmill, and gristmill. He opened Linden's first store, and later opened both copper and blacksmith shops. Additions were made to the house in the later 19th century.

== Description ==
The James H. Murray House is a small, one-and-one-half-story frame Greek Revival house. The structure has a symmetrical facade, with a central entry door flanked by framed by two twelve-over-twelve sash windows and topped with a transom above. The house is capped with a wide frieze, above which is a boxed cornice with returns. The later additions are complementary in style to the original structure. The house has been fully restored.
