= Fenton Downtown Historic District =

- Formerly listed on the U.S. National Register of Historic Places
- Michigan State Historic Site
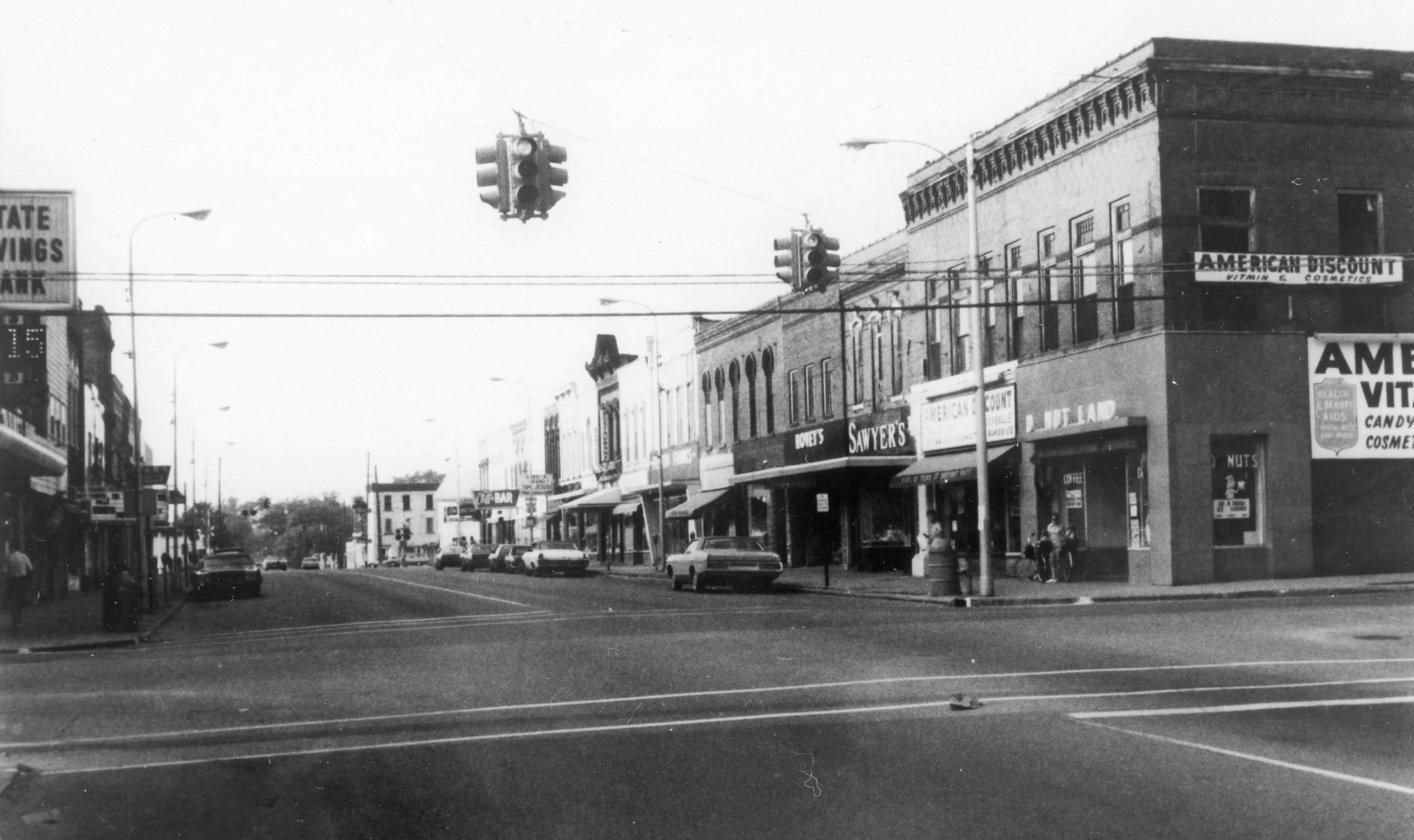
- Interactive map
- Location: Bounded by Silver Lake Rd., Ellen, Walnut and River Sts., Fenton, Michigan
- Coordinates: 42°47′47″N 83°42′18″W
- Area: 12.5 acres (5.1 ha)
- NRHP reference No.: 74002339

Significant dates
- Added to NRHP: 1974
- Removed from NRHP: January 1, 1975

The Fenton Downtown Historic District was a commercial historic district located along LeRoy Street between Silver Lake Road and Ellen Street in Fenton, Michigan. The district was added to the National Register of Historic Places in 1974, but was substantially demolished and subsequently delisted in 1975.

== History ==
Fenton was first settled in 1834, and grew considerably in the 1850s in anticipation of the establishment of the Detroit, Grand Haven and Milwaukee, through the town in 1856. The original commercial center was south of the Shiawassee River, but after the Civil War, a building boom in the town established a new center at this location. By the 1880s, a number of new brick commercial buildings had been constructed along LeRoy Street.

By the 1960s, however, shopping in downtown Fenton had dropped as consumers moved to nearby malls. In 1966, it was planned to demolish the downtown in the name of urban renewal. Some of the town instead advocated for historic preservation. After much debate, the buildings were demolished in 1975.

== Description ==
Fenton Downtown Historic District consisted of commercial and municipal structures constructed on each side of Leroy Street for two blocks. Most of these structures were two-story brick buildings; however there was one single-story building and a few three-story buildings. The buildings had individual brick and galvanized iron cornices, along with a mix of rectangular and round-arched windows capped with assorted materials.

== Gallery ==
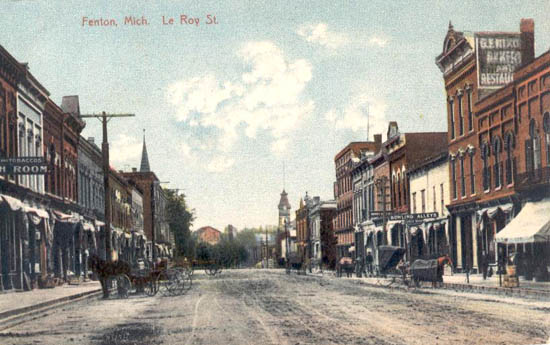

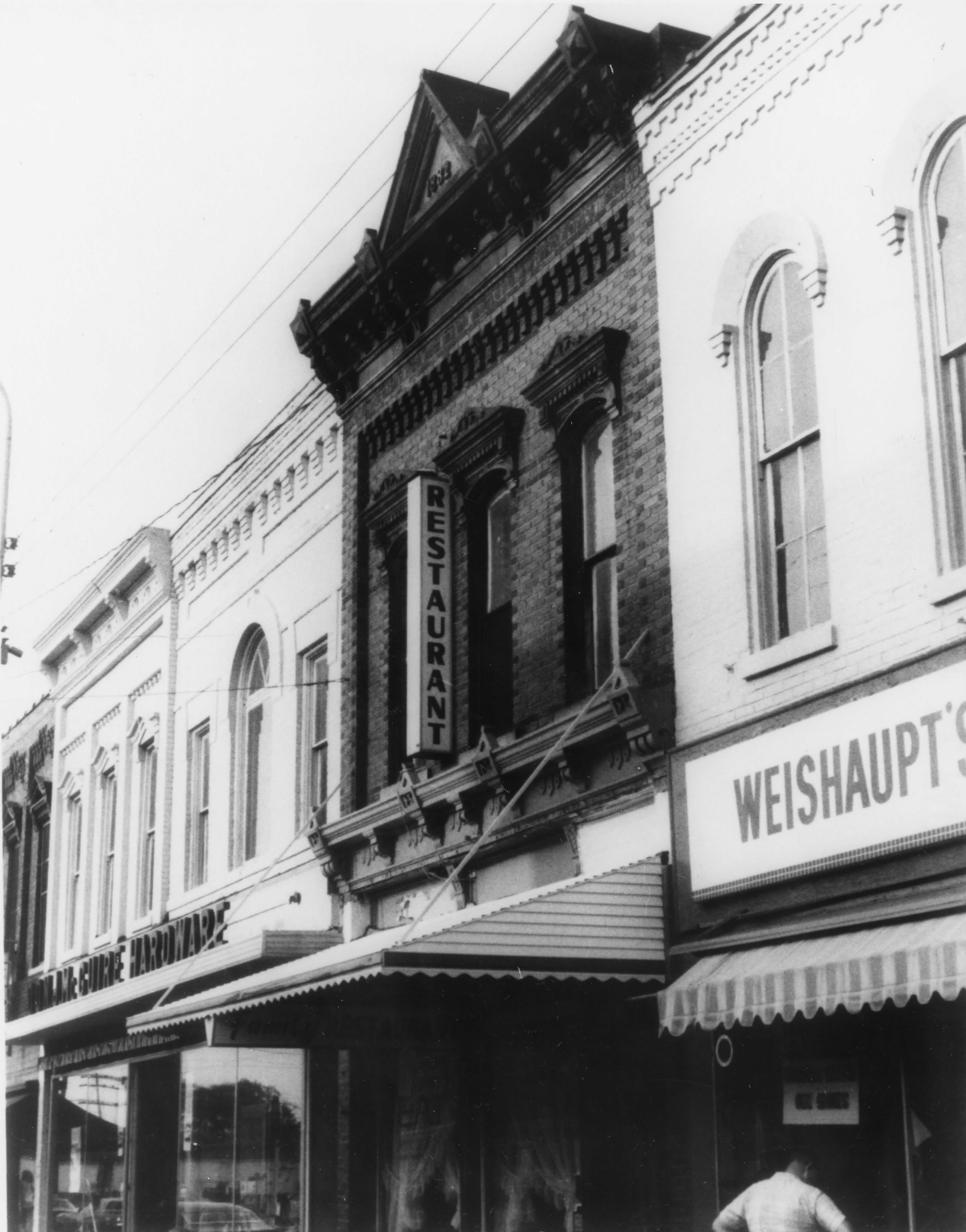
