= First Street Lofts =

- First National Bank and Trust Company Building
- U.S. National Register of Historic Places
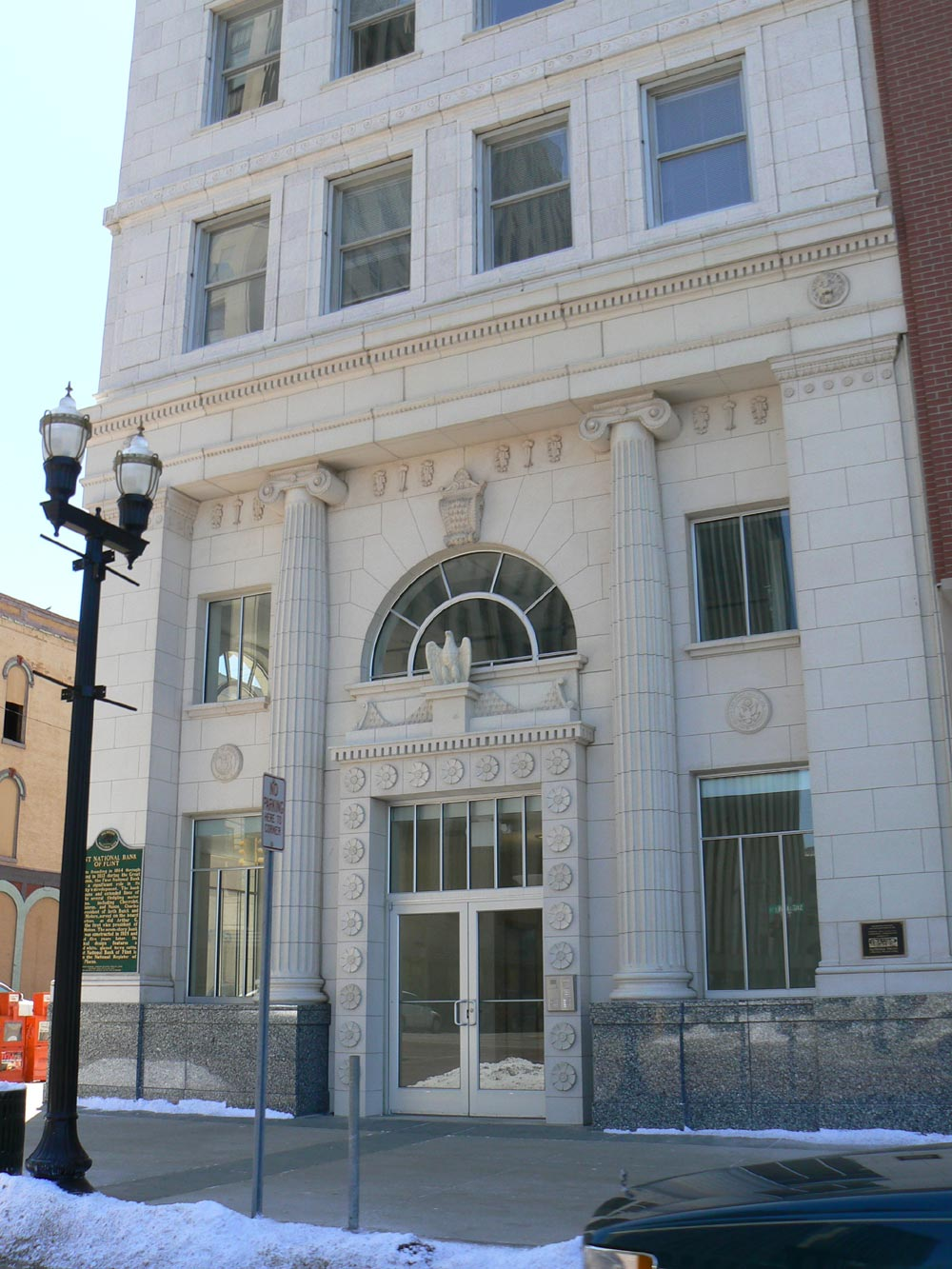
- Interactive map
- Location: 460 South Saginaw St., Flint, Michigan
- Coordinates: 43°00′57″N 83°41′28″W
- Area: 0.1 acres (0.040 ha)
- Built: 1923
- Architect: J.W. Cook
- Architectural style: Classical Revival
- NRHP reference No.: 07000646
- Added to NRHP: June 27, 2007

The First Street Lofts (formerly the First National Bank and Trust Company Building) is a converted office building located at 460 South Saginaw Street in Flint, Michigan. It was listed on the National Register of Historic Places in 2007.

== History ==
In 1858, the partnership of Meigs, Stone and Witherbee opened the Exchange Bank in Flint, with Austin B. Witherbee acting as a local representative, with two out-of-town partners. In 1864, Witherbee bought out his partners, and in 1865 reorganized it as the First National Bank; this became the First National Bank of Flint in 1905. In 1916, the bank consolidated some business aspects with the Genesee County Savings Bank. Due to Flint's booming economy, both banks were outgrowing their headquarters, and in 1919, First National purchased a lot on which to build. In 1923, they hired the local architectural firm of J.W. Cook to design a new building, and began construction. The building was completed in 1924.

The new building housed not only the bank, but the rental space on the upper floors was designed to house doctors and dentists. Over the rest of the 1920s, the bank grew tremendously, and in 1929 fully merged with the Genesee County Savings Bank, renaming itself the First National Bank and Trust Company. The merger created a need for new space, and the bank built an addition to their headquarters, nearly doubling the space. Also designed by J.W. Cook, the annex was completed in 1930. However, the 1930s also brought the Great Depression, and in 1933 the bank merged with the Union Industrial Savings Bank in order to remain open. However, both banks soon entered receivership. Liquidation of the First National Bank and Trust Company's assets began in 1934, and was not completed until 1940. The bank building was purchased by William Ballenger, a former board member, in 1940. A woman's clothing store opened in the former banking space, with professional offices still occupying the upper floors.

In 1966, the First Federal Savings and Loan Association purchased the building from the Ballenger Trust. In 2004, the Uptown Reinvestment Corporation received the building, and began restoration and rehabilitation, creating apartments upstairs and a bank space on the street level. As of 2018, the building houses lofts and is known as the First Street Lofts.

== Description ==
First Street Lofts is a rectangular, seven-story Classical Revival building, clad in white terra cotta. The building is located on a corner lot, and has a decorative entrance on each primary facade. The lower levels have been reconstructed to look like the original construction, after destructive renovation in the twentieth century. The facade facing Saginaw has an elaborate, deeply recessed central entryway topped with an arched window and a carved eagle sculpture. The entry is flanked by massive fluted Ionic piers, small windows, and Doric piers at the corners. The second floor line is topped with a terra cotta architrave, frieze, and cornice line, which continues around the corner. The side contains less decorative arch-topped windows on the lower level. The upper stories, three to seven, contain repetitive recessed window openings. An ornate cornice tops the seventh story, with a penthouse at the very top.
