= Argentine Township, Michigan =

- Civil township
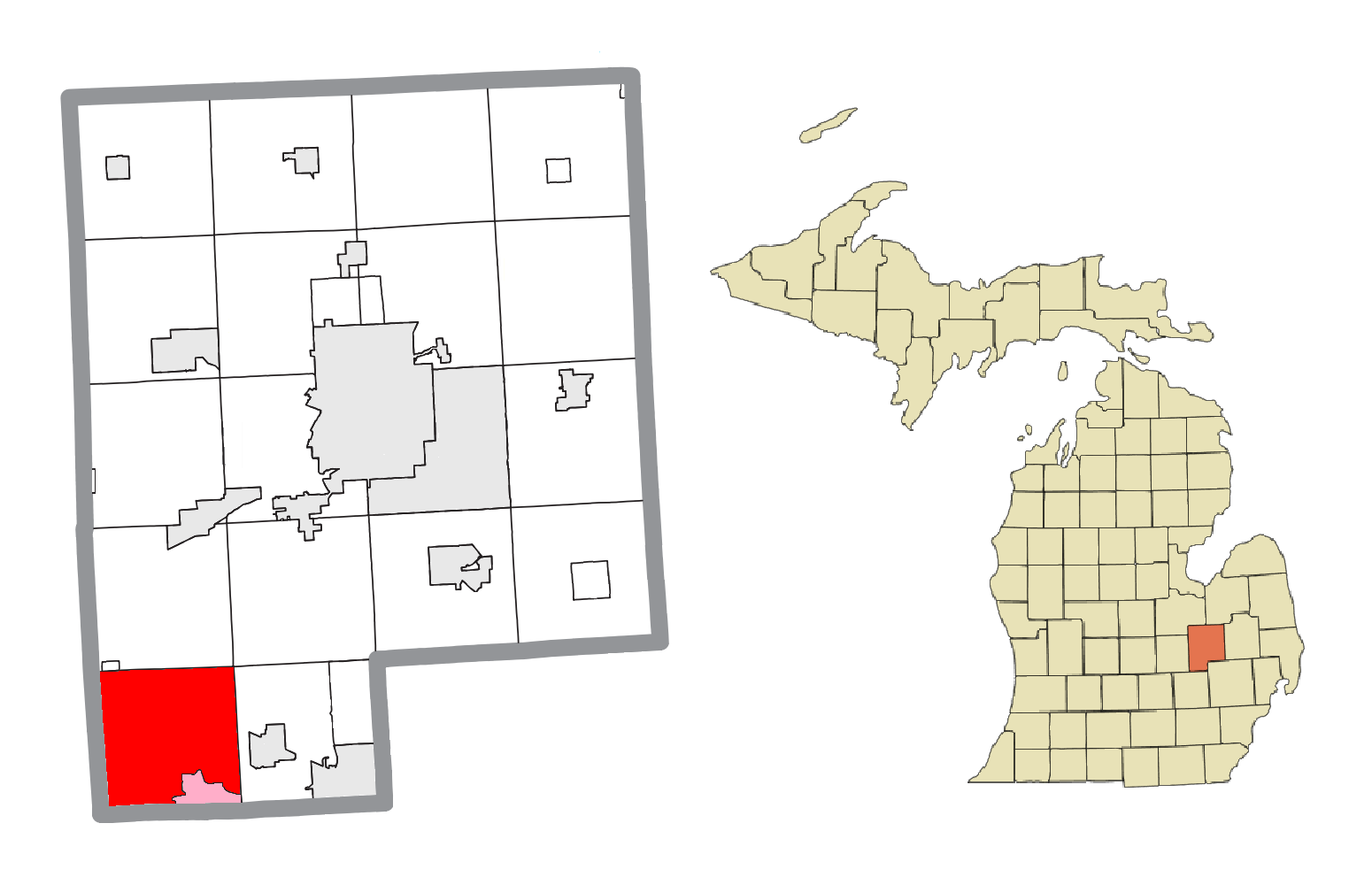
- Location within Genesee County (red) and the administered community of Argentine (pink)

- Location within the state of Michigan Argentine Township (the United States)
- Coordinates: 42°47′29″N 83°50′47″W
- Country: United States
- State: Michigan
- County: Genesee
- Organized: 1836

Government
  - Supervisor: Brian Saad
  - Clerk: Denise Graves
  - Treasurer: Norman Schmidt

Area
  - Total: 36.3 sq mi (94.1 km^{2})
  - Land: 35.1 sq mi (91.0 km^{2})
  - Water: 1.2 sq mi (3.1 km^{2})
- Elevation: 860 ft (262 m)

Population (2020)
  - Total: 7,091
  - Density: 202/sq mi (77.9/km^{2})
- Time zone: UTC-5 (EST)
  - Summer (DST): UTC-4 (EDT)
- ZIP code(s): 48418 (Byron); 48436 (Gaines); 48451 (Linden); 48457 (Montrose)
- Area code: 810
- FIPS code: 26-03420
- GNIS feature ID: 1625847
- Website: www.argentinetownship.gov

Argentine Township is a civil township of Genesee County in the U.S. state of Michigan. As of the 2020 census, the township population was 7,091, up from 6,912 at the 2010 census.

== Communities ==
- Argentine is an unincorporated community on Lobdell Lake in the southeast of the township at 42°47′29″N 83°50′47″W. A census-designated place with the same name is defined as a somewhat larger area around the community.

== Geography ==
According to the United States Census Bureau, the township has a total area of 36.3 square miles (94 km^{2}), of which 35.1 square miles (91 km^{2}) is land and 1.2 square miles (3.1 km^{2}) (3.33%) is water.

== Demographics ==
Historical population
Census	Pop.	Note	%±
1960	2,106		—
1970	2,901		37.7%
1980	4,180		44.1%
1990	4,651		11.3%
2000	6,521		40.2%
2010	6,913		6.0%
Source: Census Bureau. Census 1960- 2000, 2010.

At the 2000 census there were 6,521 people, 2,293 households, and 1,806 families in the township. The population density was 185.7 inhabitants per square mile (71.7/km^{2}). There were 2,493 housing units at an average density of 71.0 per square mile (27.4/km^{2}). The racial makeup of the township was 97.21% White, 0.23% African American, 0.84% Native American, 0.18% Asian, 0.08% Pacific Islander, 0.25% from other races, and 1.21% from two or more races. Hispanic or Latino of any race were 1.17%.

Of the 2,293 households, 43.2% had children under the age of 18 living with them, 67.0% were married couples living together, 8.0% had a female householder with no husband present, and 21.2% were non-families. 16.0% of households were one person, and 3.7% were one person aged 65 or older. The average household size was 2.82 and the average family size was 3.18.

In the township the population was spread out, with 29.7% under the age of 18, 7.1% from 18 to 24, 34.4% from 25 to 44, 21.7% from 45 to 64, and 7.1% 65 or older. The median age was 34 years. For every 100 females, there were 102.6 males. For every 100 females age 18 and over, there were 102.9 males.

The median household income was $60,641 and the median family income was $65,764. Males had a median income of $52,742 versus $32,328 for females. The per capita income for the township was $24,343. About 1.7% of families and 2.2% of the population were below the poverty line, including 3.0% of those under age 18 and none of those age 65 or over.
