= E. S. Swayze Drugstore =

- E. S. Swayze Drugstore/Otisville Mason Lodge No. 401
- U.S. National Register of Historic Places
- Michigan State Historic Site
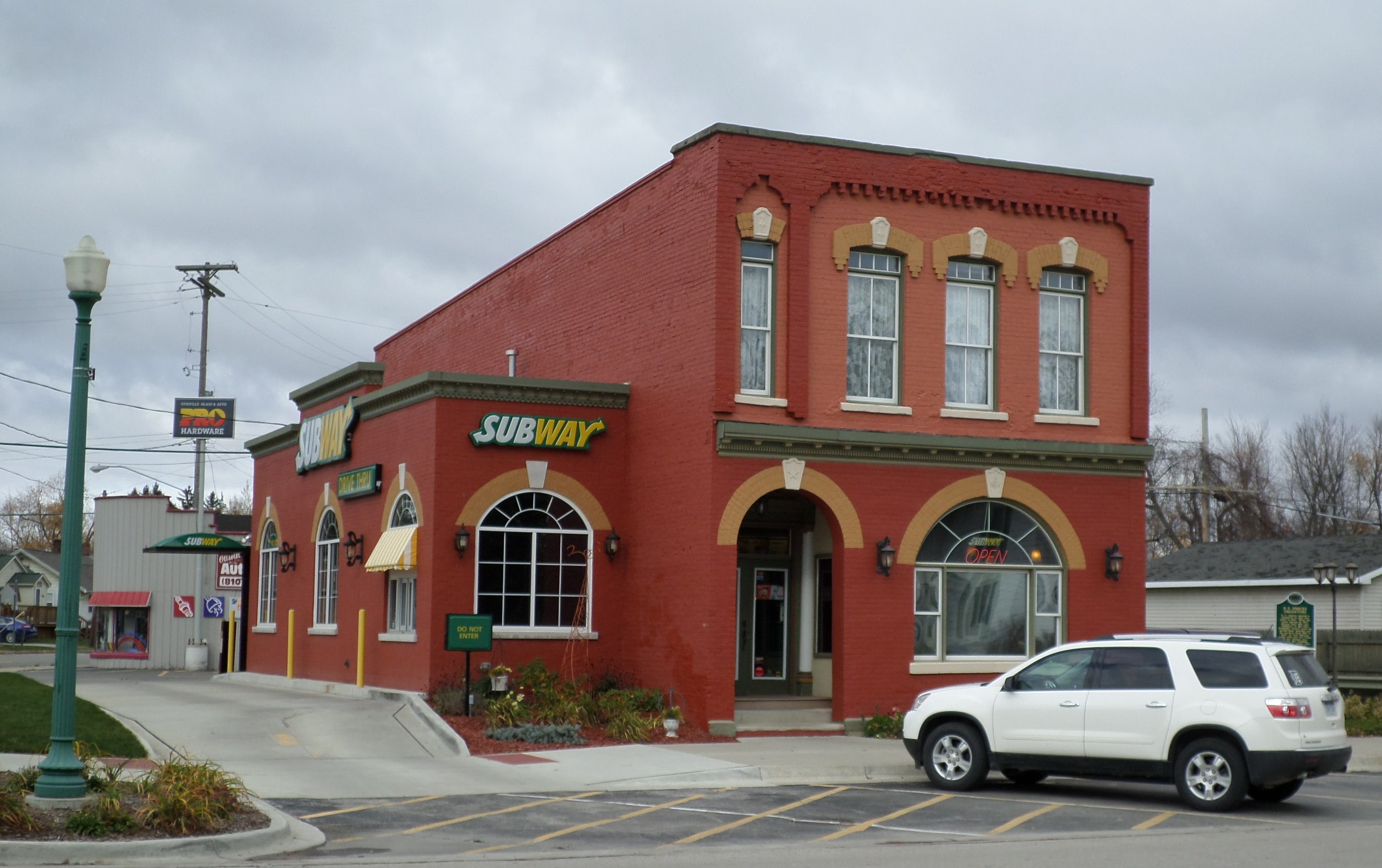
- The lodge building in November 2014

- Location within Michigan Location within the United States
- Interactive map
- Location: 106 Main St., Otisville, Michigan
- Coordinates: 43°10′0″N 83°31′27″W
- Area: less than one acre
- Built: 1874
- Architectural style: Italianate
- MPS: Genesee County MRA
- NRHP reference No.: 82000529

Significant dates
- Added to NRHP: November 26, 1982
- Designated MSHS: 2010

The E.S. Swayze Drugstore in Otisville, Michigan, United States, also known as Otisville Mason Lodge No. 401, is a building from 1874. It was listed on the National Register of Historic Places in 1982 and designated as a Michigan State Historic Site in 2010.

== History ==
This building was constructed to replace a previous store that burned in 1874. The second floor meeting hall was used by the Free Methodist Church for services from 1887 to 1890. In 1903 Otisville Lodge #401 (a local Masonic lodge) purchased the building, and used it as their meeting hall. It was owned by the Masons until 1970. The lodge has moved to other premises. The building remained vacant until at least the 1980s, but was then refurbished.

== Description ==
The E. S. Swayze Drugstore is a two-story red brick structure constructed in a vernacular Italianate style. The first floor has a double, five-panel door next to a Palladian-inspired window. Both window of which feature are set in rounded brick archways with keystones. A secondary cornice separates the first floor from the second. The second floor consists of a series of panels, containing four windows similar in to those at the first floor level. Brick corbelling runs across the cornice.
