= Dibbleville-Fentonville Historic District =

- U.S. National Register of Historic Places
- Michigan State Historic Site
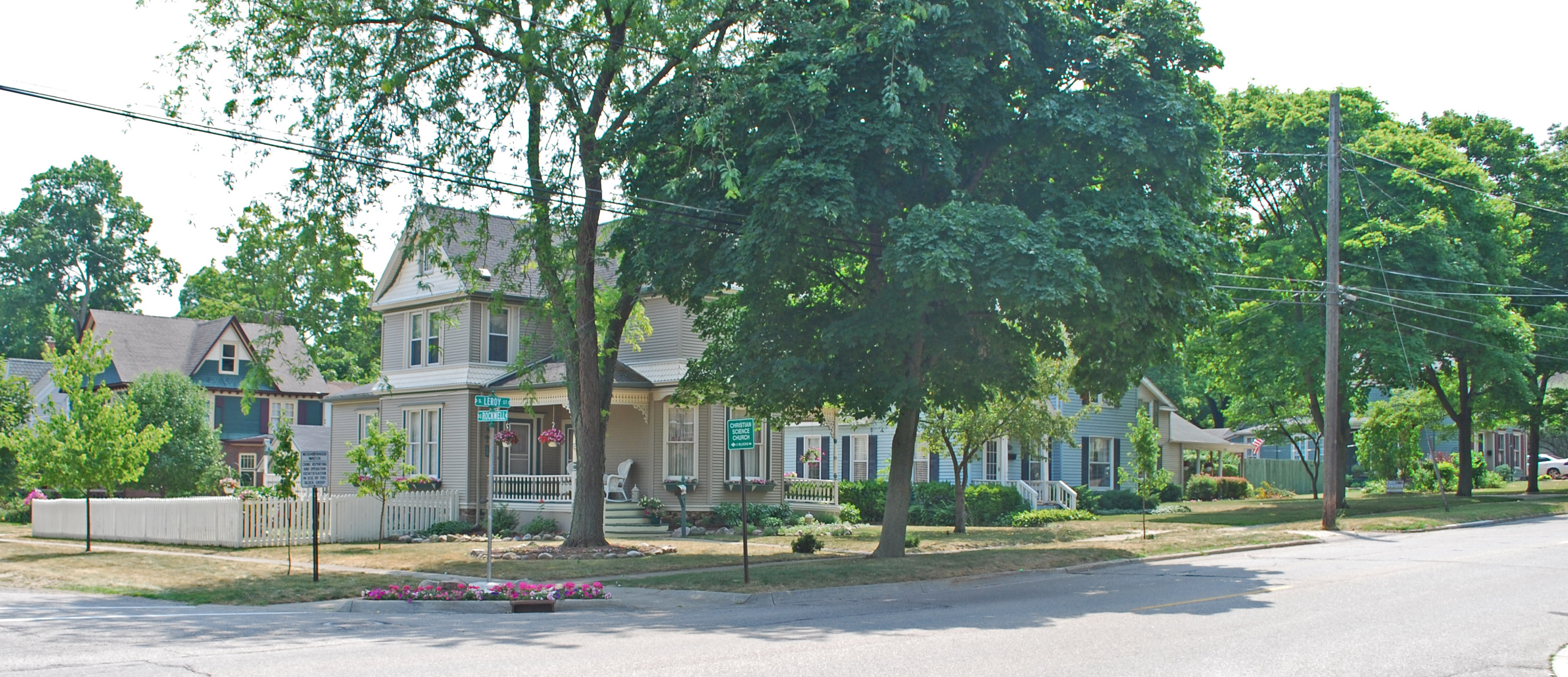
- Corner of Leroy and Rockwell Streets, looking south
- Interactive map
- Location: Roughly bounded by Shiawassee, Riggs, Holly and George Sts., Fenton, Michigan
- Coordinates: 42°47′31″N 83°42′20″W
- Area: 49 acres (20 ha)
- Architectural style: Mid 19th Century Revival, Late 19th And 20th Century Revivals
- MPS: Genesee County MRA
- NRHP reference No.: 82000507
- Added to NRHP: November 26, 1982

The Dibbleville-Fentonville Historic District is a primarily residential historic district roughly bounded by Shiawassee, Riggs, Holly and George Streets in Fenton, Michigan. It was listed on the National Register of Historic Places in 1982.

== History ==
Clark Dibble came to Michigan from New York State. He initially lived in Detroit and then Pontiac, but then stumbled across a site near the Saginaw Road where numerous Indian trails crossed. Convinced that the easy access to transportation could make a prosperous settlement, Dibble established the town of Dibbleville at this site in 1834. He established a sawmill and promoted the settlement, but did not stay long. In 1836, Robert LeRoy and William M. Fenton purchased the entire townsite on the advice of Robert's father, Judge Daniel LeRoy, who predicted the area would prosper when a planned railroad line was constructed. In 1837, Leroy and Fenton platted the town and renamed it Fentonville; they and other settlers opened stores, mills and hotels as Fentonville grew. The settlement was centered around the intersection of Shiawassee and Leroy Streets, and early settlers built houses nearby.

In 1856, the Detroit and Milwaukee Railroad built a line through the settlement, and Fentonville expanded again, adding industrial activities such as a fruit preservation plant, a woolen mill, a tannery, a brewery, and other operations. Both residential and commercial areas of the city expanded, and plats were added to the town. The community became a major market and shipping center. Fenton continued as a major center until the early 20th century, when nearby Flint began to dominate the area. As automobiles became more prevalent, Fenton's role as a market and industrial center declined. However, many residents were lured by the opportunity to commute to Flint, Pontiac, or Lansing and the automotive assembly jobs offered. Fenton continues to serve as a bedroom community for Flint and other nearby cities.

== Description ==
The Dibbleville-Fentonville Historic District includes 130 structures, of which 119 contribute to the historic character of the neighborhood. Of the 130 structure, 111 are originally residential (four of which have been converted to commercial use), 12 are commercial, four are churches, and three are public or institutional structures. These structures range from Greek Revival and Gothic Revival residences constructed in the 1830s to 1860s, to Italianate and Queen Anne structures from the later 19th century to Shingle, Colonial Revival, Mission, Spanish Revival, and Bungalow styles structures from around the turn of the century. Residential structures come is a range of sizes and grandeur, from large mansions to modest worker's cottages. The structures are made from wood, brick, cement block, stone, and various combinations of these materials.

The core of the district is the two commercial blocks in a T-shaped area at the intersection of Leroy and Shiawassee Streets. This area includes mainly two-story, brick Italianate commercial style buildings. Many have cast iron and pressed metal storefronts, rounded arch windows and decorative cornices. Nearby are four churches. The commercial sector is surrounded by residential buildings.

== Gallery ==
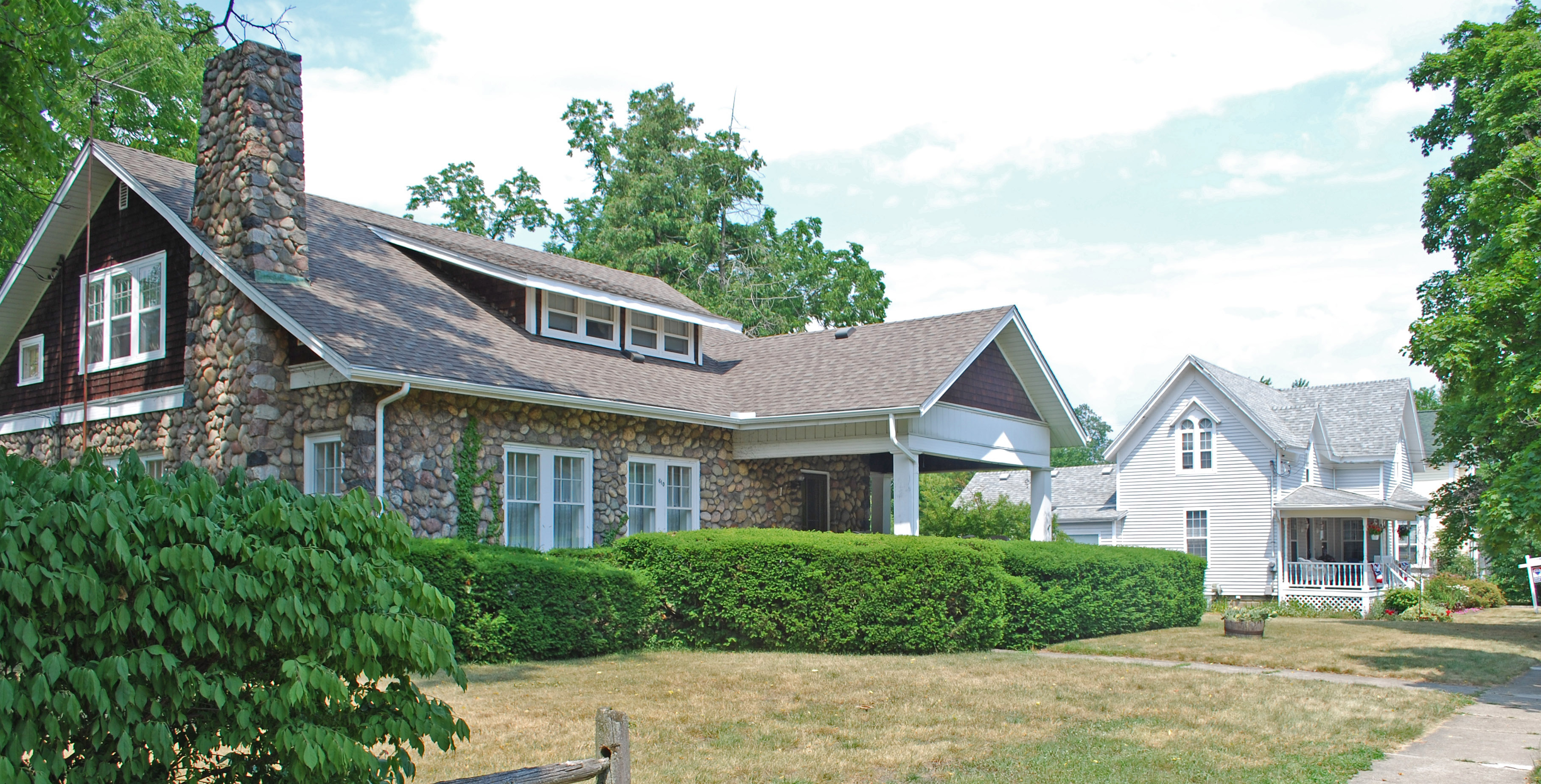
Corner of Leroy and Rockwell Streets, looking north

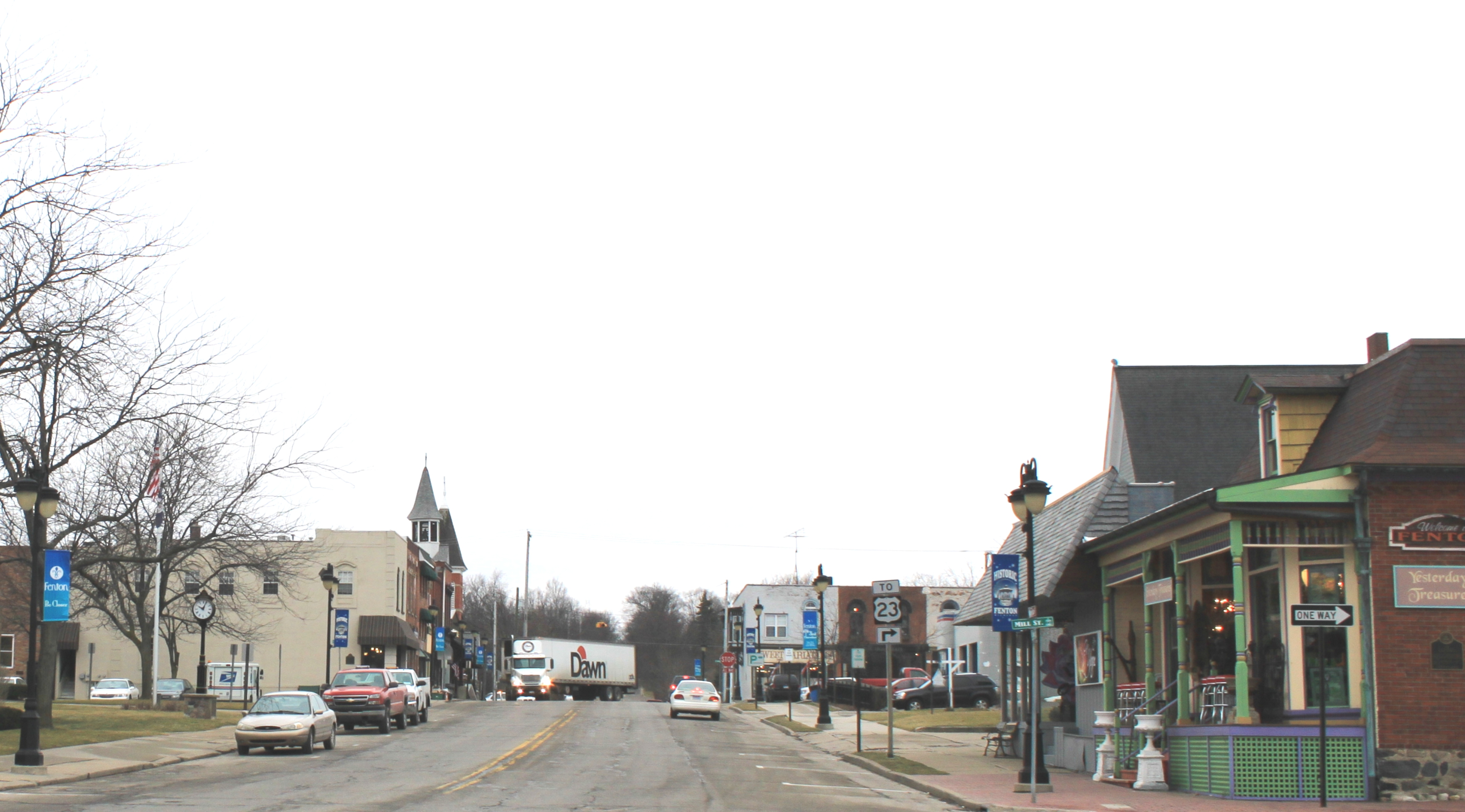
Leroy Street at Shiawassee, looking south

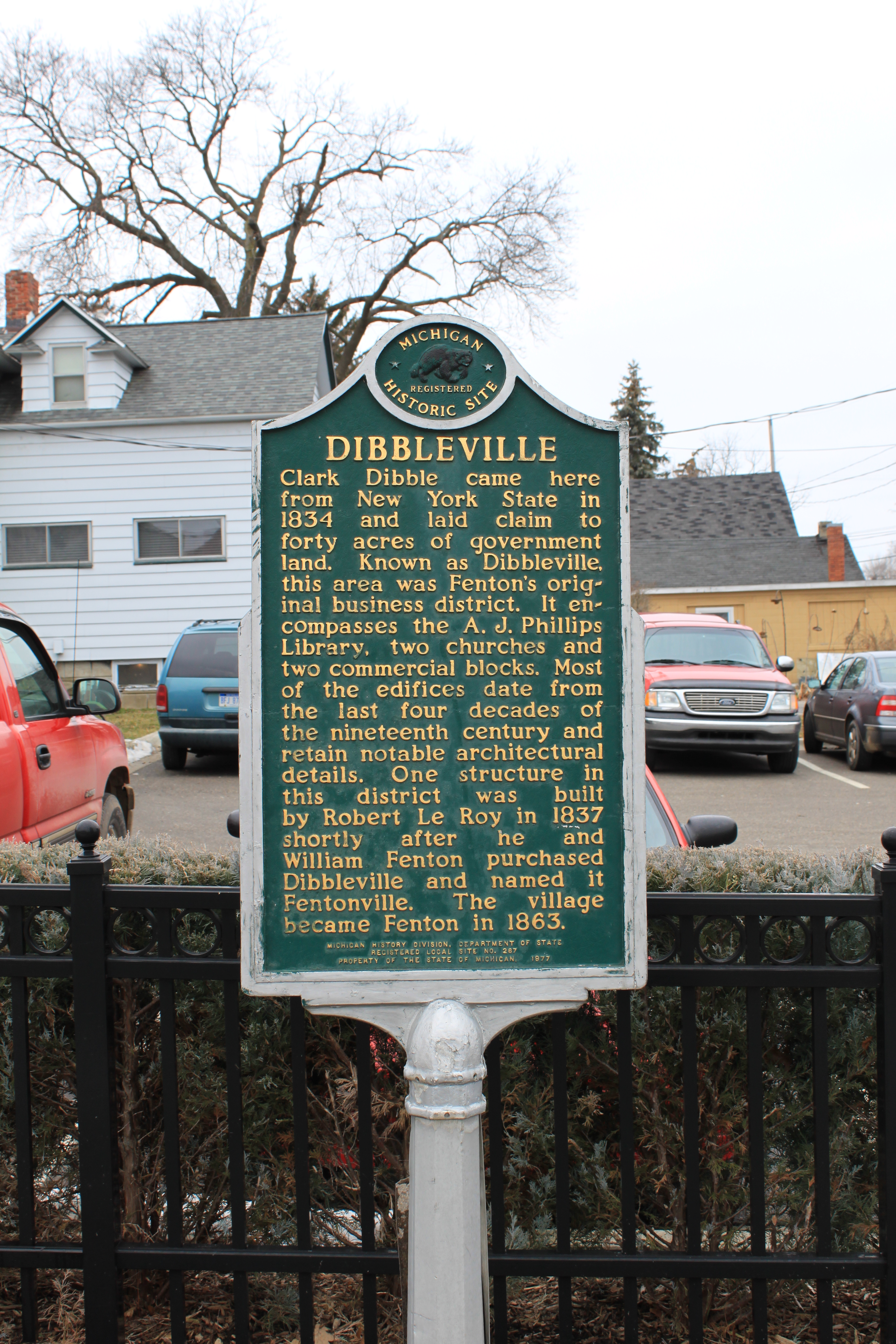
Historic marker
