= First Baptist Church of Grand Blanc =

Historic church in Michigan, United States

- U.S. National Register of Historic Places
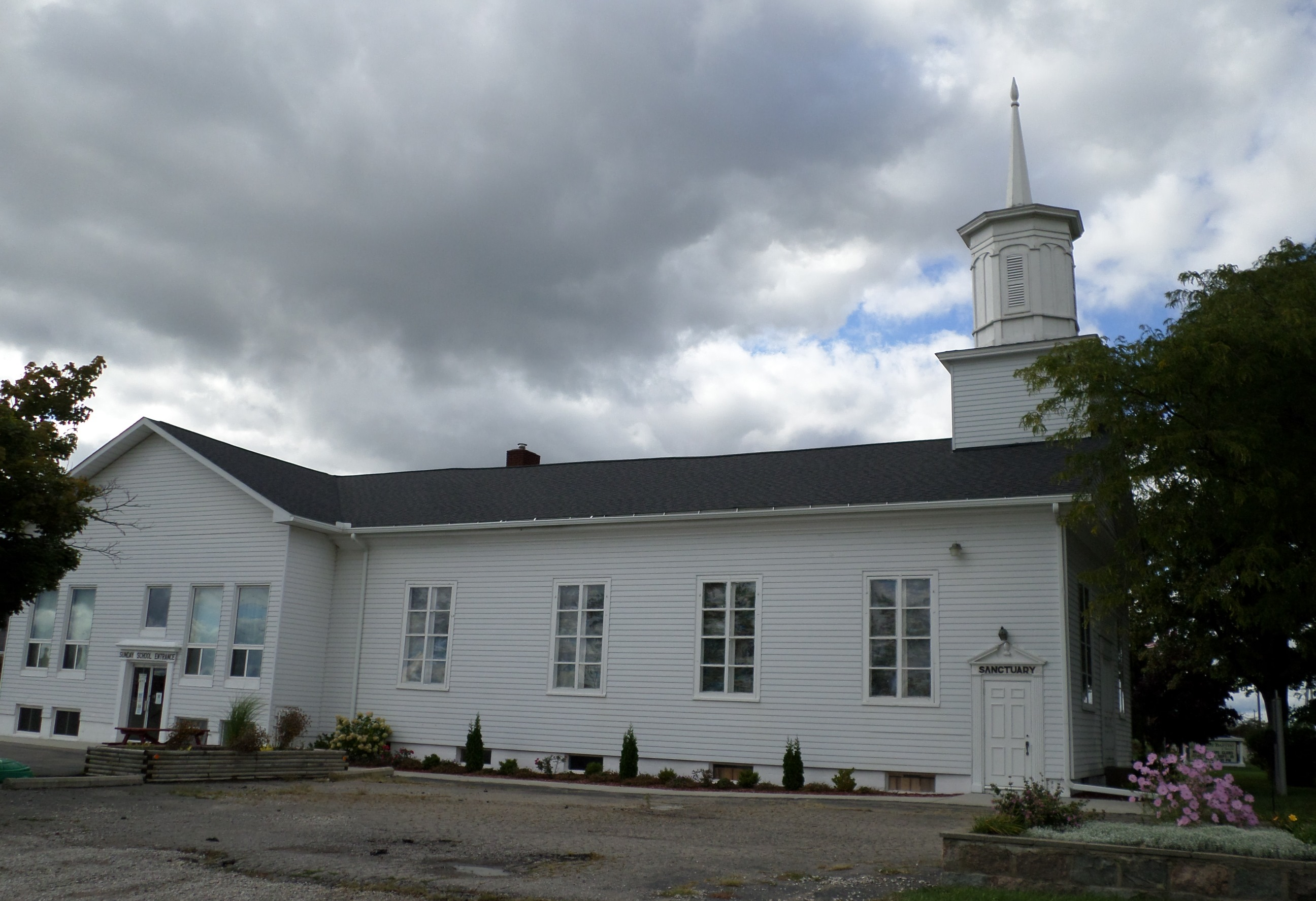
- The south side of the church, September 2014

- Location within Michigan Location within the United States
- Interactive map
- Location: 6101 S. Saginaw St., Grand Blanc, Michigan
- Coordinates: 42°56′32″N 83°38′53″W
- Area: less than one acre
- Built: 1851
- Architectural style: Greek Revival
- MPS: Genesee County MRA
- NRHP reference No.: 83000844
- Added to NRHP: June 20, 1983

First Baptist Church of Grand Blanc is a historic church at 6106 S. Saginaw Street in Grand Blanc, Michigan. It was built in 1851 and added to the National Register in 1983. It still serves the local Baptist congregation.

== History ==
The First Baptist Church of Grand Blanc was organized in 1833, and held services in the homes or barns of members. Chauncey Gibson a site for the construction of a permanent church, and the church building was completed in 1851. The church recruited its first pastor, Elder Edgar Randall, in 1879. Randall served as pastor until 1911.

== Description ==
The First Baptist Church of Grand Blanc is a rectangular plan gable end structure, three bays wide. The front facade has a central double door entrance flanked with pilasters. and topped by a full entablature. On either side are stained glass windows; more windows line the side facades. The church is topped with an octagonal belfry.
