= Lake Fenton, Michigan =

- Census-designated place (CDP) & unincorporated community
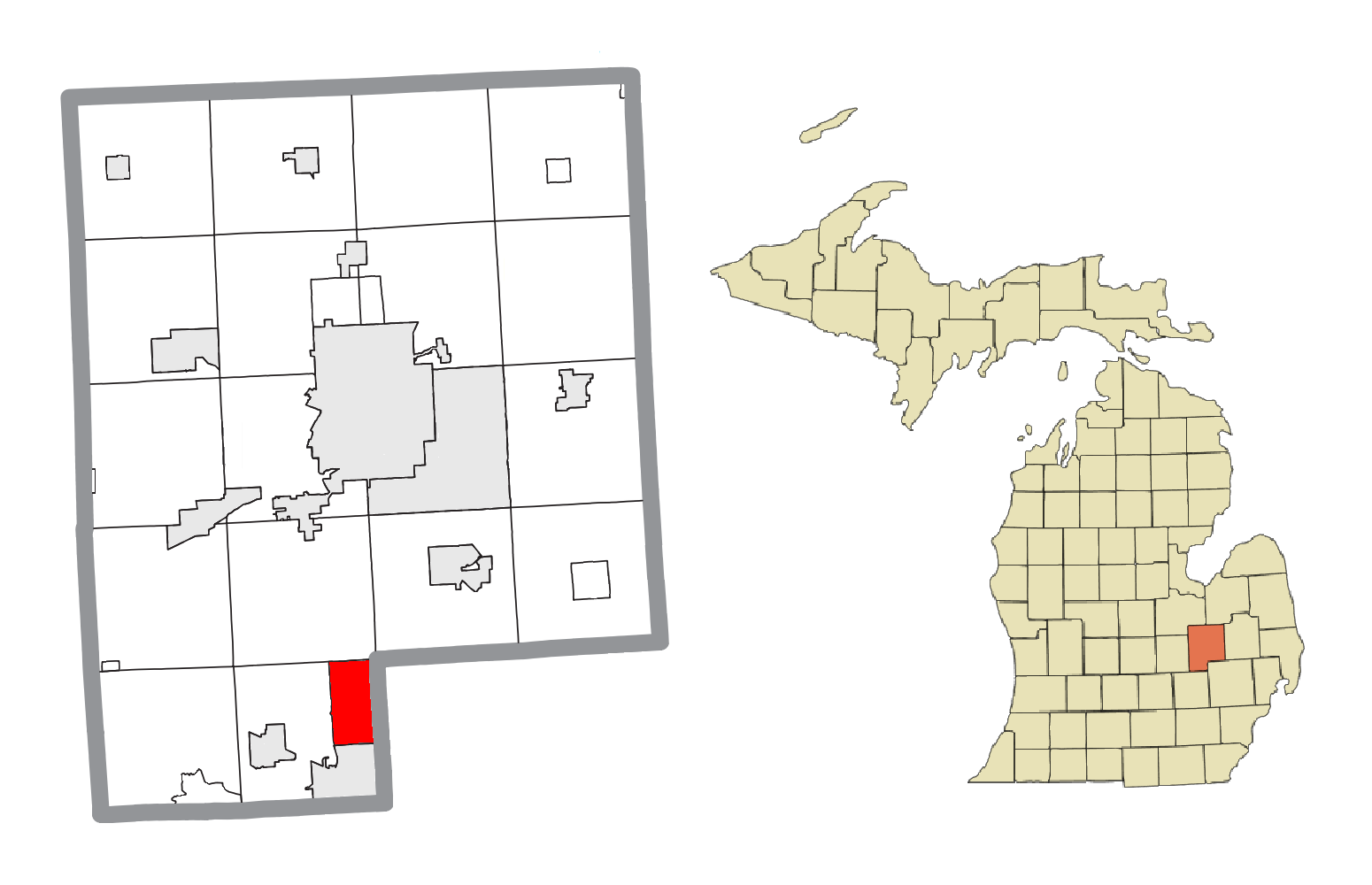
- Location within Genesee County

- Location within the state of Michigan Lake Fenton (the United States)
- Coordinates: 42°50′46″N 83°42′28″W
- Country: United States
- State: Michigan
- County: Genesee
- Township: Fenton

Area
  - Total: 7.20 sq mi (18.66 km^{2})
  - Land: 5.52 sq mi (14.29 km^{2})
  - Water: 1.69 sq mi (4.38 km^{2}) 23.51%
- Elevation: 879 ft (268 m)

Population (2020)
  - Total: 5,905
  - Density: 1,070.6/sq mi (413.36/km^{2})
- Time zone: UTC-5 (EST)
  - Summer (DST): UTC-4 (EDT)
- ZIP code(s): 48430 (Fenton); 48451 (Linden); 48439 (Grand Blanc)
- Area code: 810
- FIPS code: 26-44520
- GNIS feature ID: 1867319

Lake Fenton is a census-designated place (CDP) in Fenton Charter Township, Genesee County in the U.S. state of Michigan. As of the 2020 census, Lake Fenton had a population of 5,905. The CDP includes the unincorporated communities of Bayport Park and Lakeside.

The Lake Fenton Community Schools district overlaps a portion of this and adjacent areas. The school district and community are named after Lake Fenton, formerly known as Long Lake. A community was platted as "Mount Pleasant" by John Cook in 1840, with a second plat added in 1845. The name was changed to "Long Lake" in 1850, and a post office with that name opened on March 6, 1851. The lake was subsequently renamed "Lake Fenton", and the platted settlement became extinct. In 1932, the United States Board on Geographic Names decided on "Lake Fenton" as the official name of the lake.

Astronaut Michael J. Bloomfield grew up in Lake Fenton (his address was officially Linden, Michigan, and he was born in Flint).

== Communities ==
- Lakeside is an unincorporated community on the east side of Lake Fenton at 42°50′09″N 83°42′24″W, a short distance north of Fenton.
- Bayport Park is an unincorporated community on the north side of Lake Fenton at 42°51′15″N 83°43′04″W with elevation at 889 feet (271 meters).

== Geography ==
The Lake Fenton CDP occupies the northeast corner of Fenton Township, bordered to the north by Mundy Township, to the west by the rest of Fenton Township, to the south by the city of Fenton, and to the east by Holly Township in Oakland County. All but the southern end of Lake Fenton, the water body, is located within the Lake Fenton CDP; the southern end of the lake is in the city of Fenton. Other lakes in the CDP include Petts Lake, Crooked Lake, McCully Lake, Dollar Lake, Little Long Lake, and Barnum Lake. According to the United States Census Bureau, the CDP has a total area of 7.2 square miles (18.6 km^{2}), of which 5.5 square miles (14.3 km^{2}) is land and 1.7 square miles (4.4 km^{2}), or 23.51%, is water.

From the center of the Lake Fenton CDP, it is 3.5 miles (5.6 km) south to the center of Fenton city, and 12 miles (19 km) north to downtown Flint, via Fenton Road.

== Demographics ==
Historical population
Census	Pop.	Note	%±
2020	5,905		—
U.S. Decennial Census

=== 2020 census ===
As of the 2020 census, Lake Fenton had a population of 5,905. The median age was 46.8 years. 18.6% of residents were under the age of 18 and 21.1% of residents were 65 years of age or older. For every 100 females there were 97.3 males, and for every 100 females age 18 and over there were 97.0 males age 18 and over.

90.2% of residents lived in urban areas, while 9.8% lived in rural areas.

There were 2,440 households in Lake Fenton, of which 26.7% had children under the age of 18 living in them. Of all households, 55.7% were married-couple households, 16.4% were households with a male householder and no spouse or partner present, and 20.4% were households with a female householder and no spouse or partner present. About 24.4% of all households were made up of individuals and 10.9% had someone living alone who was 65 years of age or older.

There were 2,652 housing units, of which 8.0% were vacant. The homeowner vacancy rate was 0.5% and the rental vacancy rate was 3.2%.

Racial composition as of the 2020 census
Race	Number	Percent
White	5,465	92.5%
Black or African American	35	0.6%
American Indian and Alaska Native	17	0.3%
Asian	44	0.7%
Native Hawaiian and Other Pacific Islander	4	0.1%
Some other race	30	0.5%
Two or more races	310	5.2%
Hispanic or Latino (of any race)	159	2.7%

=== 2000 census ===
As of the 2000 census, there were 4,876 people, 1,886 households, and 1,433 families residing in the CDP. The population density was 884.3 inhabitants per square mile (341.4/km^{2}). There were 2,076 housing units at an average density of 376.5 per square mile (145.4/km^{2}). The racial makeup of the CDP was 97.09% White, 0.25% Black or African American, 0.45% Native American, 0.66% Asian, 0.02% Pacific Islander, 0.27% from other races, and 1.27% from two or more races. 1.39% of the population were Hispanic or Latino of any race.

There were 1,886 households, out of which 31.2% had children under the age of 18 living with them, 64.8% were married couples living together, 7.2% had a female householder with no husband present, and 24.0% were non-families. 19.5% of all households were made up of individuals, and 6.2% had someone living alone who was 65 years of age or older. The average household size was 2.58 and the average family size was 2.97.

In the CDP, the population was spread out, with 23.6% under the age of 18, 7.1% from 18 to 24, 29.0% from 25 to 44, 29.2% from 45 to 64, and 11.1% who were 65 years of age or older. The median age was 40 years. For every 100 females there were 102.7 males. For every 100 females age 18 and over, there were 102.0 males.

The median income for a household in the CDP was $67,885, and the median income for a family was $82,366. Males had a median income of $54,559 versus $32,804 for females. The per capita income for the CDP was $32,717. 3.2% of the population and 1.0% of families were below the poverty line. Out of the total population, 1.1% of those under the age of 18 and 4.7% of those 65 and older were living below the poverty line.
