= Vermont House and Fenton Grain Elevator =

- U.S. National Register of Historic Places
- Michigan State Historic Site
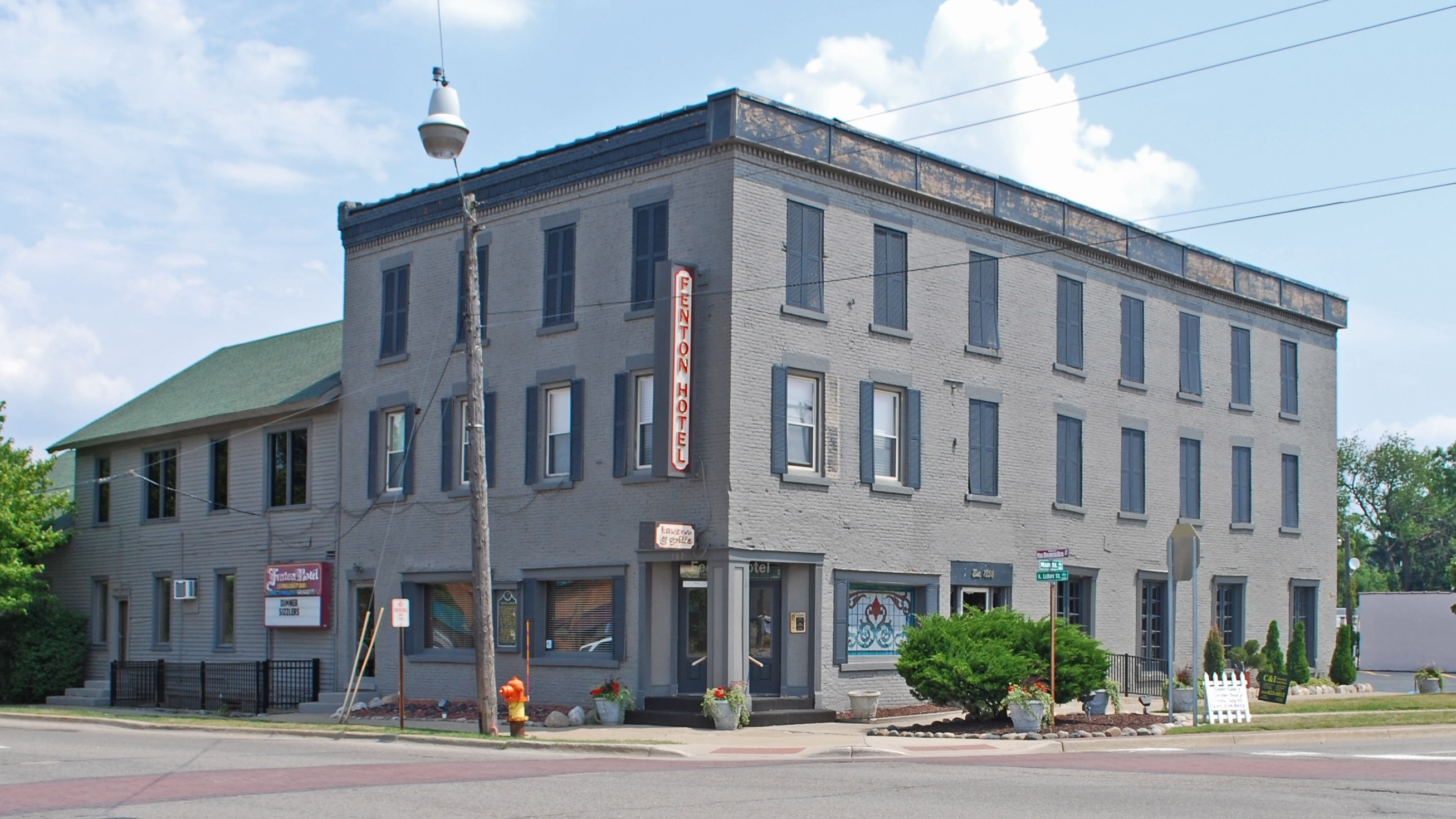
- Interactive map
- Location: 302 and 234 N. Leroy St., Fenton, Michigan
- Coordinates: 42°47′54″N 83°42′17″W
- Area: 2 acres (0.81 ha)
- Built: 1855
- NRHP reference No.: 80001853
- Added to NRHP: May 15, 1980

The Vermont House (also known as the Fenton Hotel and Fenton House) and Fenton Grain Elevator are two adjacent buildings located at 302 and 234 North Leroy Street in Fenton, Michigan. They were listed on the National Register of Historic Places in 1980.

== Fenton Hotel: History ==
In 1855, the Detroit, Grand Haven and Milwaukee Railway opened a line running from Pontiac to what is now Fenton. To service the influx of rail passengers, two local businessmen, Messrs. Seed and Flint, began construction of a hotel just north of the rail tracks. The Vermont House opened to the public in the middle of 1856. Seed and Flint managed the establishment until 1868, when local restaurateur Abner Roberts purchased it. Roberts renamed it the Hotel Fenton and managed it until 1876. Over the next decade, the hotel changed ownership multiple times until 1887, when Major L. L. Andress purchased it. It was sold again in 1892 and 1898, when Henry Hurd purchased it. In 1905, Mrs. L. R. Peer bought the hotel, then it was purchased in 1915 by Arthur Domanois, in 1945 by Mr. and Mrs. O'Rielly, in the early 1970s by Kurt Hartman and John Laffrey, and in 1977 by Harvey Gammage. It was purchased by a series of owners over the next two decades, until 1997 when Nick and Peggy Sorise purchased it.

During the Fenton Hotel's history, it served the travelling public and the local community, with space for wedding receptions and other celebrations. Although the upper guest rooms have been closed to the public since the mid-twentieth century, the restaurant in the building still operates. As of 2018, the restaurant operates as the Fenton Hotel Tavern & Grille.

== Fenton Grain Elevator: History ==
In 1865, J. R. Mason constructed the Fenton Grain Elevator on a site opposite the hotel. The elevator was successful, but Mason sold it to D. G. Colwell and E. M. Adams in 1867. By the 1880s, the elevator was handling about 20% of all the wheat produced in Genesee County. The elevator was sold to Mssrs. Smith and Stoner in the 1880s, and to Burdick Potter in the 1890s. Potter used the elevator for storage well into the twentieth century. The facility was used later by the Michigan Bean Company and the Big Acre Lumber Store, divisions of Wickes Corporation. By 1980, the elevator was used by the Michigan Craft and Artisan Foundation. In 2015, the building was sold to SkyPoint Ventures, who redeveloped it; Red Fox Outfitters moved into the building later that year.

== Fenton Hotel: Description ==
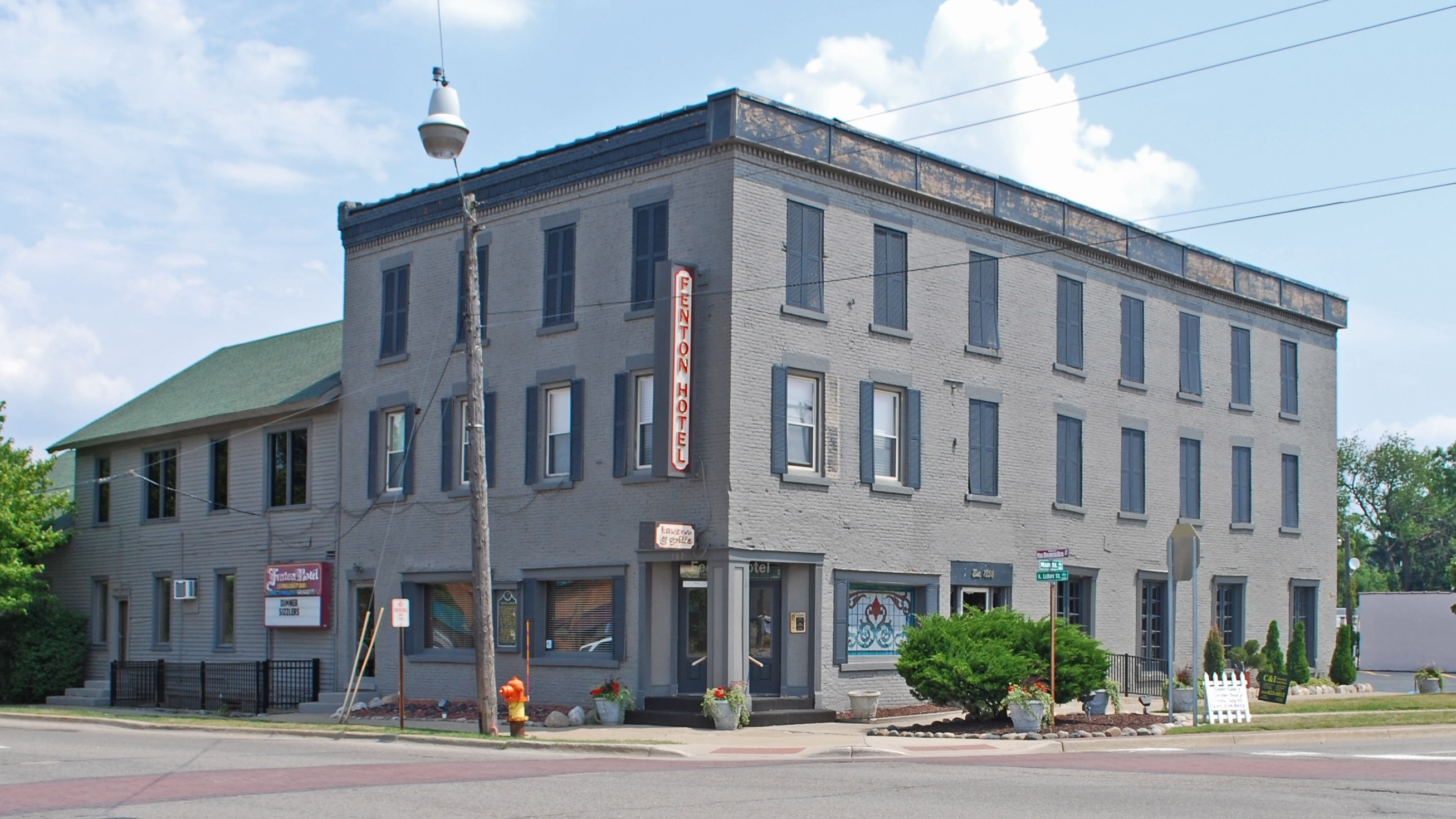
Fenton Hotel

The original section of the Fenton Hotel is a rectangular, three-story brick structure on a rubble foundation with a float roof. It is located directly on the sidewalk line. The windows are simple rectangular units with stone lintels, placed symmetrically. A simple brick corniceline encircles the building. A two-story wood-framed, gable roofed addition, constructed in 1882, is attached on one side. A single-story brick kitchen is attached at the rear.

The interior contains a foyer, bar and dining room on the first floor, with meeting and guest rooms on the upper floors.

== Fenton Grain Elevator: Description ==
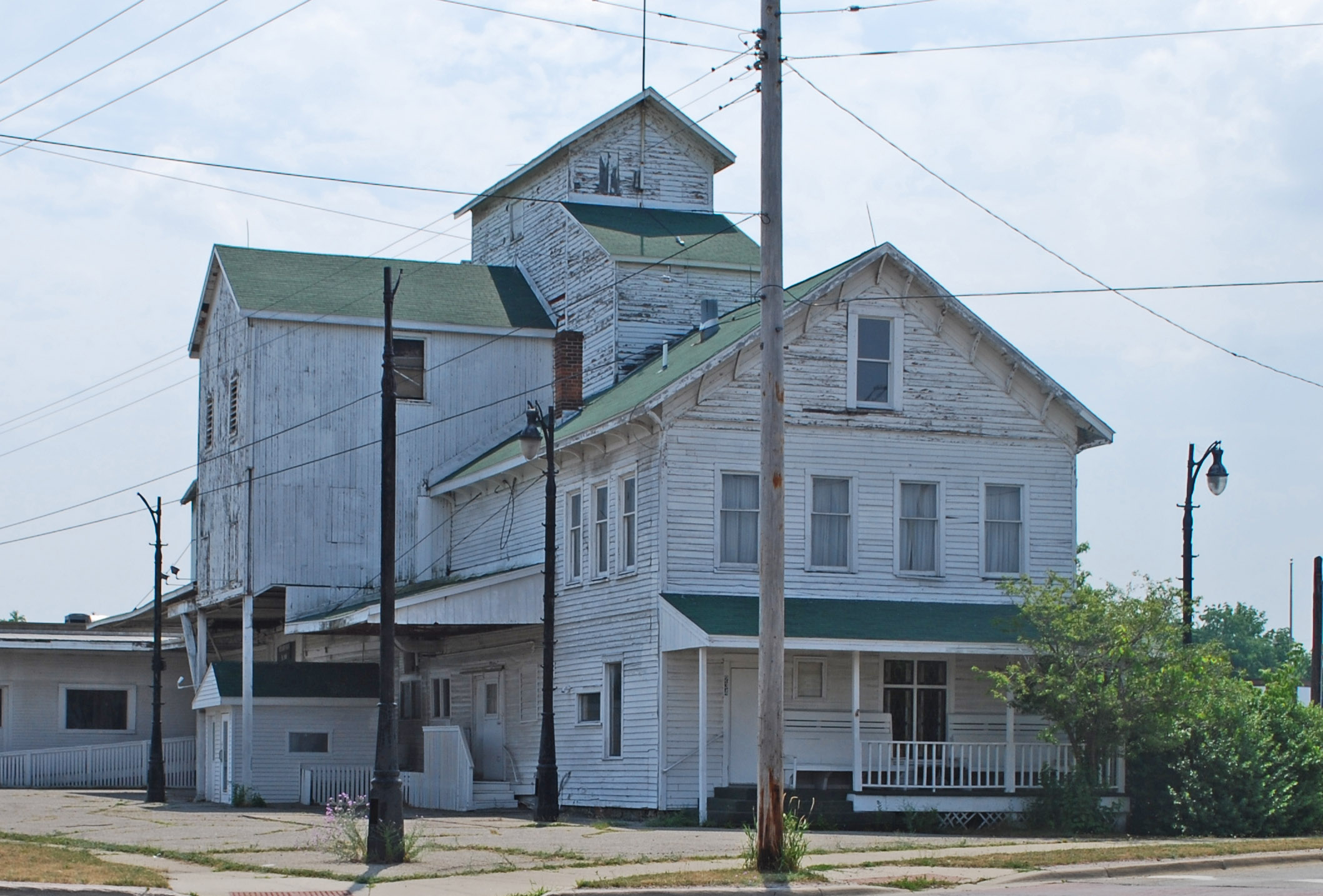
Fenton grain elevator

The Fenton grain elevator is located across the street from the Fenton Hotel. It is a wood-frame structure covered with board-and-batten or clapboard siding, sitting on a rubble foundation. It is basically rectangular, with portions ranging from two to 3 1/2 stories in height. It has an irregular floorplan and asymmetric massing. The roof is a combination of gable and shed styles. The street facade has a business entrance with a door on the first floor and four windows on the second. On the side are three sets of huge double doors originally for cartloads of grain.
