= Linden Mill =

- U.S. National Register of Historic Places
- Michigan State Historic Site
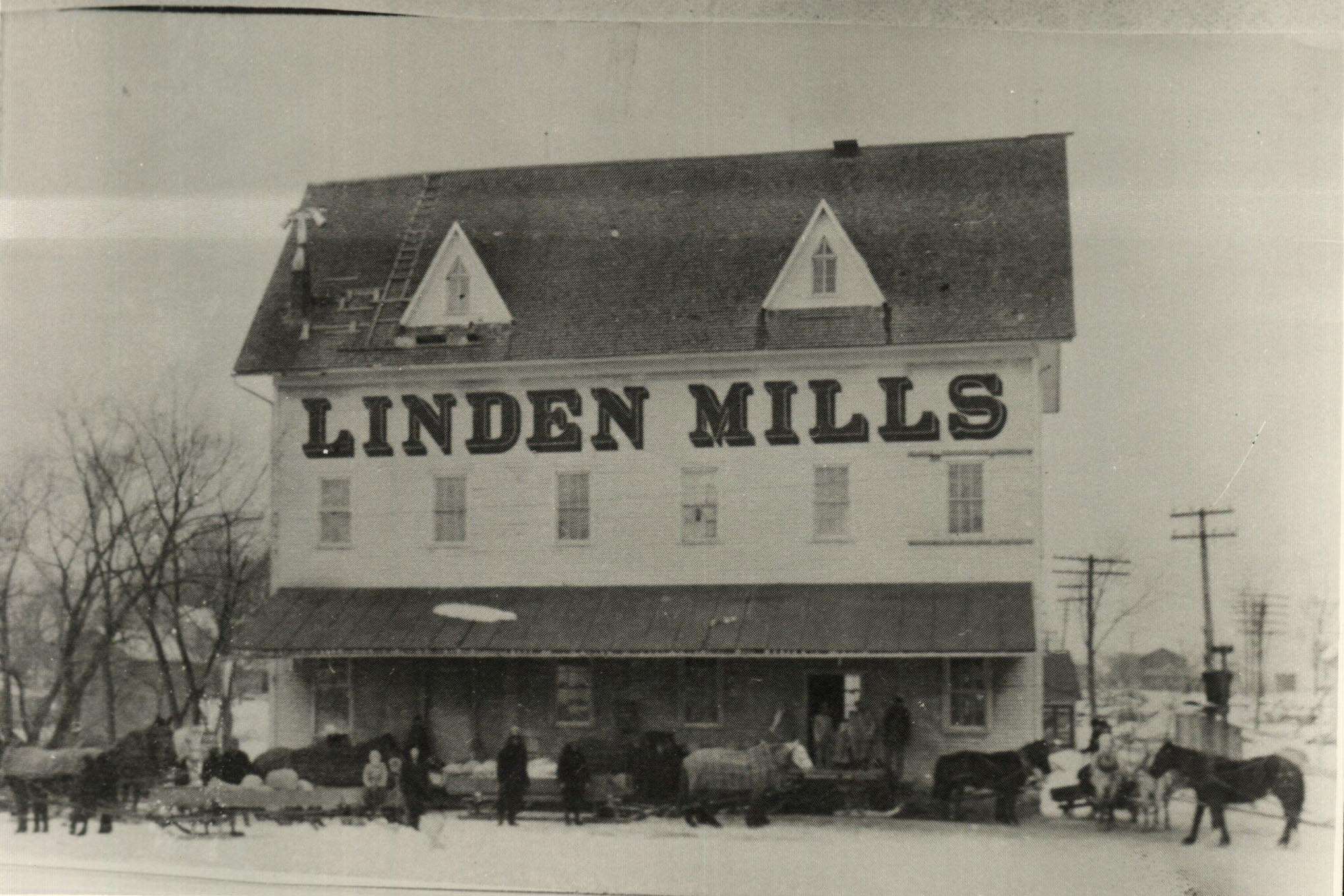
- Mill, c. 1890
- Interactive map
- Location: 201 N. Main St., Linden, Michigan
- Coordinates: 42°48′55″N 83°46′54″W
- Area: 1 acre (0.40 ha)
- Built: 1850
- NRHP reference No.: 72000615
- Added to NRHP: August 21, 1972

The Linden Mill is a former gristmill located in Linden, Michigan. It was listed on the National Register of Historic Places in 1972. As of 2018, the building housed the Linden branch of the Genesee District Library and the Linden Mills Historical Society Museum.

== History ==
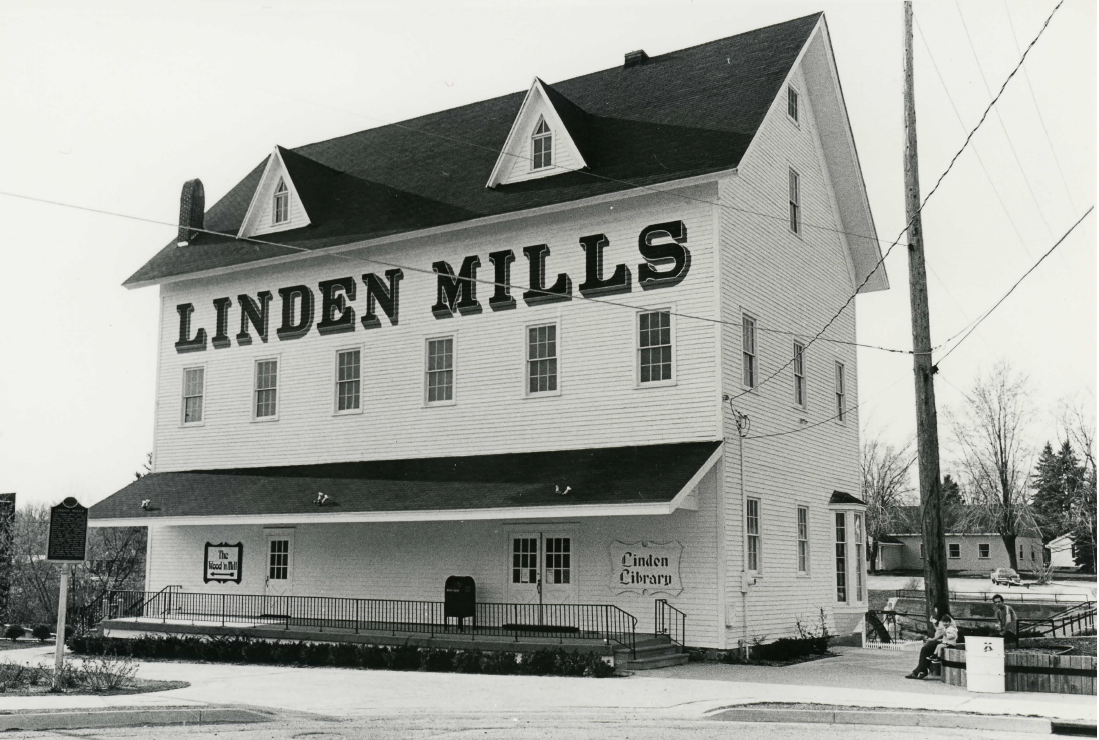
Linden Mill in 1982

Two mills were first built in Linden in 1837 and 1838. These burned, and in 1850, Seth C. Sadler and M. Warren bought the mill sites and constructed the present gristmill as well as a saw mill located across the river. These mills were operated together, and known as the "Linden Mills." By 1864, Linden had 450 inhabitants, and multiple businesses that depended on the mills, such as furniture manufacturers, makers of, staves and carriages, and a grain elevator. The saw mill burned down during the Civil War, but was soon rebuilt. In 1864, Israel B. Hyatt purchased the mills, and in about 1880 Myron Harris took over.

At some point, the saw mill was demolished, but the gristmill continued in operation until 1956. At that point, the water wheel was sold and the village of Linden purchased the mill for use as a library, and to house municipal offices. The structure was remodeled, and opened as a community center in 1961. In 1971, the water wheel was replaced with another wheel from an old mill. The municipal offices moved out of the building during the 1960s, and in 1976, the Linden Mills Historical Society Museum opened in the building. As of 2018, the library and the historical museum are still located in the old mill.

== Description ==
The Linden Mill is a 2-1/2-story frame structure, standing on a fieldstone basement that is exposed on the river side. The building measures approximately thirty feet by sixty feet. It has a gable roof with two dormers on each side. The exterior is clad with clapboard, and windows are six-over-six units, located on each side of the building. In the river side, windows are in both upper stories and the basement, giving the impression of a three-story building. The front facade has a shed roof running the full width of the facade.
