= Fenton Township, Michigan =

- Charter township
- Charter Township of Fenton
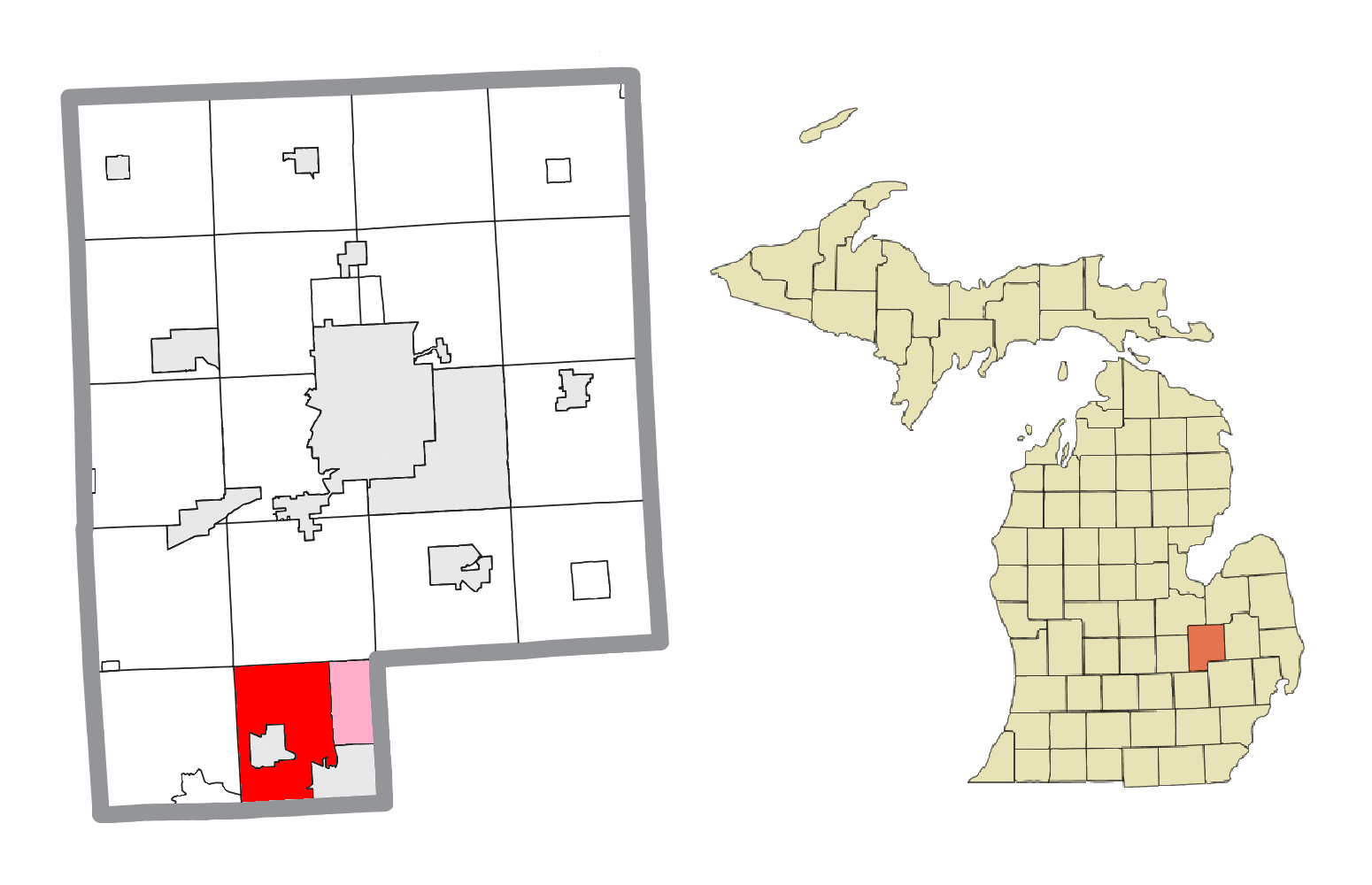
- Location within Genesee County (red) and the administered community of Lake Fenton (pink)

- Location within the state of Michigan
- Coordinates: 42°50′00″N 83°45′00″W
- Country: United States
- State: Michigan
- County: Genesee
- Settled: 1834
- Organized: 1838
- Chartered: 1980

Government
  - Supervisor: Bonnie Mathis
  - Clerk: Robert Krug
  - Treasurer: John Tucker

Area
  - Total: 27.5 sq mi (71.3 km^{2})
  - Land: 23.9 sq mi (61.8 km^{2})
  - Water: 3.7 sq mi (9.5 km^{2}) 13.29%
- Elevation: 869 ft (265 m)

Population (2020)
  - Total: 16,843
  - Density: 706/sq mi (273/km^{2})
- Time zone: UTC-5 (EST)
  - Summer (DST): UTC-4 (EDT)
- ZIP code(s): 48430 (Fenton); 48451 (Linden)
- Area code: 810
- FIPS code: 26-27780
- GNIS feature ID: 1626276
- Website: www.fentontownship.org

Charter Township of Fenton is a charter township of Genesee County in the U.S. state of Michigan. The population was 16,843 at the 2020 census.

The cities of Fenton and Linden were formed from areas formerly within the township.

== Communities ==
- Lake Fenton, is an area within the township, defined as a census-designated place (CDP) for statistical purposes by the U.S. Census Bureau. The Lake Fenton Community Schools district overlaps a portion of this and adjacent areas. This CDP includes two unincorporated communities, Lakeside and Bayport Park.

== History ==
The township land was initially a part of Grand Blanc Township when it was organized March 9, 1833, and a part of Genesee County when it was formed by the territorial legislature in 1835. The Fenton survey township area was a part of Argentine Township starting July 26, 1836 when it was separately organized.

Clark Dibble, a pioneer from New York, was the first white settler to purchase land in the township, in March 1834. Other settlers followed at Dibble's invite from Grumlaw, with Dustin Cheney and his family first to move there, forming the community of Dibbleville. and in 1837, William M. Fenton and Robert LeRoy bought land, a sawmill and water rights from Dibble, who moved elsewhere. Fenton and LeRoy had the settlement, then known as Dibbleville, platted. According to local legend, Fenton and LeRoy decided who would name the town in a game of poker. The town would be named after the winner and the main street after the loser. Fenton won and the town was known as Fentonville.

On June 26, 1837, the Fentonville post office opened and was renamed Fenton on February 25, 1866. The Township of Fenton was organized on March 6, 1838.

The town was incorporated as the Village of Fenton in 1863. While in 1871, Village of Linden was incorporated from the area in the center of the township.

The Township became a Charter Township in 1980. In 1988, Linden completely separated from the township when the community changed its incorporated status from village to city.

In 2000, the township, along with the cities of Fenton and Linden, passed a millage to turn the Tri-County Parks & Recreation share department into a parks and recreation metropolitan district. While Argentine Township and Tyrone Townships defeated the millage. Tri-County ceased operation on December 1, 2000, when the Southern Lakes Regional Parks & Recreation District began operations.

== Geography ==
According to the United States Census Bureau, the township has a total area of 27.5 square miles (71 km^{2}), of which 23.9 square miles (62 km^{2}) is land and 3.7 square miles (9.6 km^{2}) (13.29%) is water.

== Demographics ==
As of the census of 2000, there were 12,968 people, 4,883 households, and 3,803 families residing in the township. The population density was 543.2 inhabitants per square mile (209.7/km^{2}). There were 5,247 housing units at an average density of 219.8 per square mile (84.9/km^{2}). The racial makeup of the township was 97.02% White, 0.28% African American, 0.41% Native American, 0.77% Asian, 0.03% Pacific Islander, 0.34% from other races, and 1.15% from two or more races. Hispanic or Latino of any race were 1.18% of the population.

There were 4,883 households, out of which 34.8% had children under the age of 18 living with them, 68.1% were married couples living together, 6.2% had a female householder with no husband present, and 22.1% were non-families. 17.7% of all households were made up of individuals, and 5.1% had someone living alone who was 65 years of age or older. The average household size was 2.66 and the average family size was 3.02.

In the township, the population was spread out, with 25.2% under the age of 18, 6.6% from 18 to 24, 30.6% from 25 to 44, 28.6% from 45 to 64, and 9.0% who were 65 years of age or older. The median age was 38 years. For every 100 females, there were 100.4 males. For every 100 females age 18 and over, there were 100.9 males.

The median income for a household in the township was $71,094, and the median income for a family was $79,579. Males had a median income of $58,425 versus $35,018 for females. The per capita income for the township was $31,560. About 2.3% of families and 3.4% of the population were below the poverty line, including 2.7% of those under age 18 and 4.5% of those age 65 or over.

== Government ==
The Fenton Post Office, ZIP code 48430, serves the eastern portion of Fenton Township. While the Linden Post Office, ZIP code 48451, serves the western portion of Fenton Township.

=== Southern Lakes Parks & Recreation ===
Southern Lakes Regional Parks & Recreation District is a metropolitan district formed with the levying of a millage of .4 mills to operate park and recreational programs. Parks are owned by the cities and township in the district, Fenton City, Fenton Township, and Linden City.

Tri-County Parks & Recreation was formed in 1993 between Fenton City and Township, Tyrone Township and Fenton Community Schools as a consolidated summer recreation program.

With Tri-County Recreation's success, a series of "Town Hall Meetings" and "Strategic Study Session" were held for the program to expand to year-round activities. A charter commission was formed for Tri-County Recreation to change its form to a metropolitan district with the addition of Linden City and Argentine Township.

In November 2000, the township, along with the cities of Fenton and Linden, passed a millage to turn the Tri-County Parks & Recreation share department into a parks and recreation metropolitan district. While Argentine Township and Tyrone Townships defeated the millage. Tri-County ceased operation on December 1, 2000, when the Southern Lakes Regional Parks & Recreation District began operations.
