= Linden, Michigan =

- City
- City of Linden
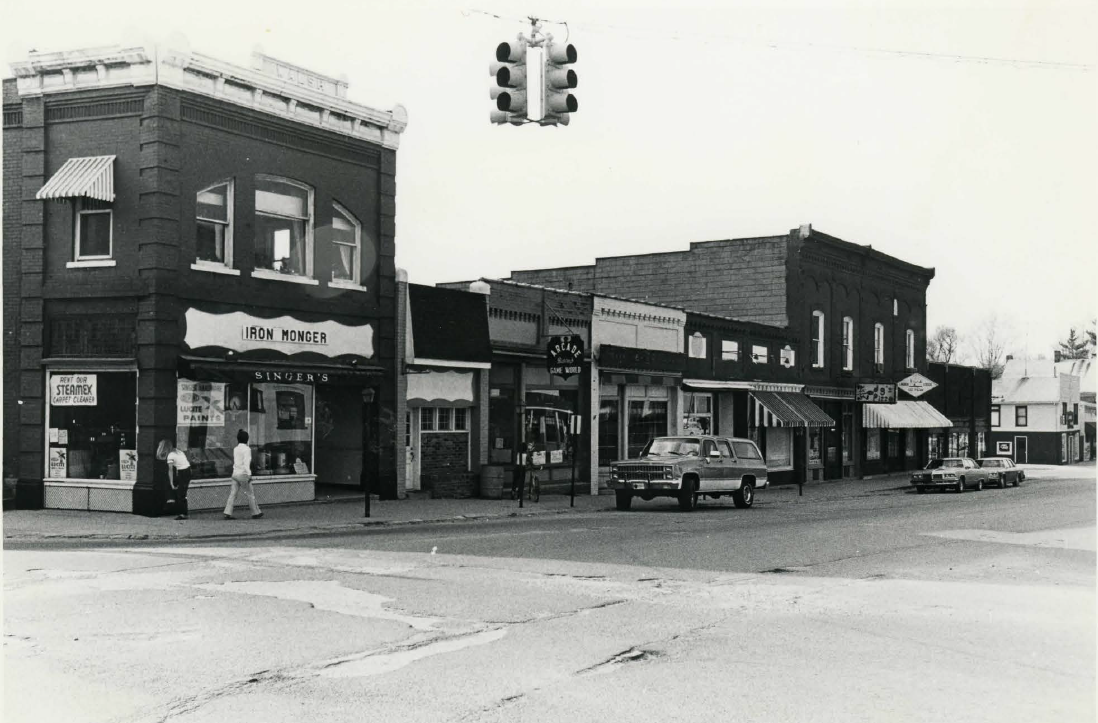
- Bridge Street-Broad Street Historic District in 1982

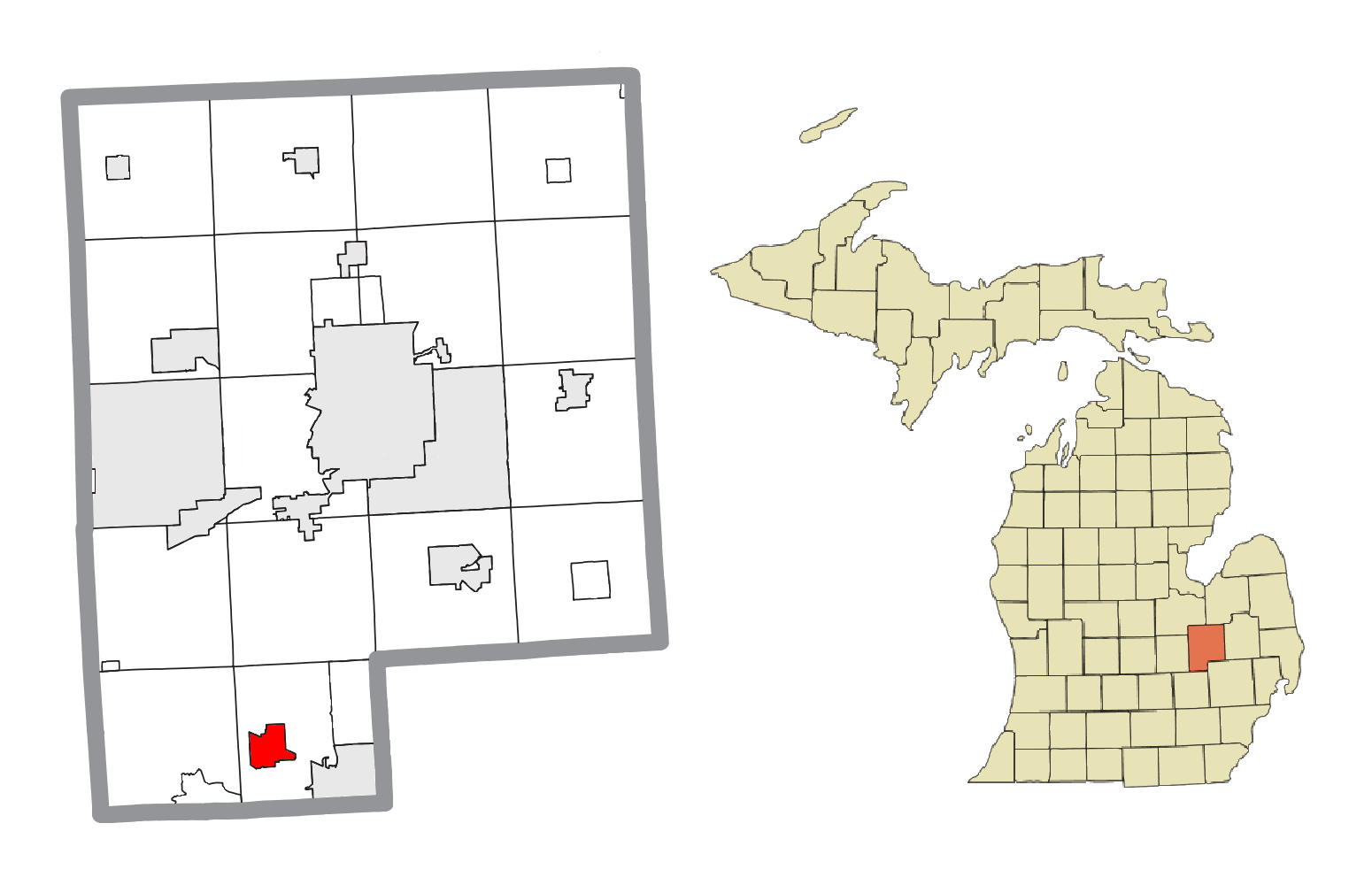
- Location within Genesee County

- Location within the state of Michigan
- Coordinates: 42°48′54″N 83°46′54″W
- Country: United States
- State: Michigan
- County: Genesee
- Settled: 1835
- Platted: 1840
- Incorporated: 1871 (village); 1988 (city)

Government
  - Type: Council–manager
  - Mayor: David E. Lossing
  - Mayor Pro-tem: Danielle Cusson
  - City manager: Ellen Glass

Area
  - Total: 2.42 sq mi (6.27 km^{2})
  - Land: 2.36 sq mi (6.10 km^{2})
  - Water: 0.066 sq mi (0.17 km^{2}) 2.88%
- Elevation: 873 ft (266 m)

Population (2020)
  - Total: 4,142
  - Density: 1,759/sq mi (679.1/km^{2})
- Time zone: UTC-5 (EST)
  - Summer (DST): UTC-4 (EDT)
- ZIP code(s): 48451
- Area code: 810
- FIPS code: 26-47820
- GNIS feature ID: 0630496
- Website: www.lindenmi.us

Linden is a city in southern Genesee County, Michigan, United States. Its population was 4,142 at the 2020 census. It is a part of the Fenton urban area just south of the Flint metropolitan area.

== History ==
Linden was settled in late 1835 by two brothers, Richard and Perry Lamb. Perry Lamb provided housing for travelers. The village of Linden subdivision was platted by Consider Warner and Eben Harris in 1840. Warner and Harris also built the Springer's Hotel hostelry that same year.

On September 23, 1851, the Linden post office was opened. North Linden village was platted in the northwest corner of section 20 along the railroad on January 31, 1857. Linden was incorporated as a village in 1871 by an act of the Legislature.

In 1974, the community began to hold its Summer Happening festival. In 1988, Linden changed its incorporated status from village to city.

In 2000, Linden, along with Fenton City and Township, passed a millage to turn the Tri-County Parks and Recreation share department into a parks and recreation metropolitan district, while Argentine Township and Tyrone Townships defeated the millage. Tri-County ceased operation on December 1, 2000 when the Southern Lakes Regional Parks and Recreation District began operations.

On May 18, 2007, a fire destroyed the historic Union Block of businesses and apartments on Broad Street. The building was demolished in August 2007 to make way for future development. In 2008, the LaFontaine family purchased the vacant space of seven lots. In 2014, an underground gasoline leak from the Beacon and Bridge gas station affected Union Block and other downtown properties. Dr. Nicole Wax of Wax Orthodontics of Linden purchased the block from the LaFontaine family in March 2016.

Summer Happenings was not held in 2011. A competing annual festival, Linden Mills Days, was launched in 2011 when Happenings pulled out of the city. In 2012, Happenings was held on Linden Community Schools grounds; while successful, it did not return in 2013.

In September 2011, one of the Loose Senior Center buildings was destroyed by fire. A capital campaign began to replace the building. In June 2012, the center's board of directors agreed to place a bid on a building in Fenton Township. Instead, the center added an expansion to an existing building which was finished in December 2013.

== Geography ==
According to the United States Census Bureau, the city has a total area of 2.43 square miles (6.29 km^{2}), of which 2.36 square miles (6.11 km^{2}) are land and 0.07 square miles (0.18 km^{2}) is covered by water. Linden is a lowland area typical of southern Michigan consisting of marsh, swamplands, previously dredged marl bottom lakes and surrounded by the similar geographic area of Fenton Township.

== Demographics ==
Historical population
Census	Pop.	Note	%±
1860	271		—
1870	565		108.5%
1880	676		19.6%
1890	552		−18.3%
1900	543		−1.6%
1910	550		1.3%
1920	579		5.3%
1930	717		23.8%
1940	782		9.1%
1950	933		19.3%
1960	1,146		22.8%
1970	1,546		34.9%
1980	2,174		40.6%
1990	2,415		11.1%
2000	2,861		18.5%
2010	3,991		39.5%
2020	4,142		3.8%
U.S. Decennial Census

=== 2020 census ===
As of the 2020 census, Linden had a population of 4,142. The median age was 44.7 years. 21.3% of residents were under the age of 18 and 25.3% of residents were 65 years of age or older. For every 100 females there were 89.1 males, and for every 100 females age 18 and over there were 86.6 males age 18 and over.

99.5% of residents lived in urban areas, while 0.5% lived in rural areas.

There were 1,690 households in Linden, of which 29.1% had children under the age of 18 living in them. Of all households, 49.8% were married-couple households, 15.8% were households with a male householder and no spouse or partner present, and 28.8% were households with a female householder and no spouse or partner present. About 29.3% of all households were made up of individuals and 16.3% had someone living alone who was 65 years of age or older.

There were 1,790 housing units, of which 5.6% were vacant. The homeowner vacancy rate was 1.0% and the rental vacancy rate was 7.1%.

Racial composition as of the 2020 census
Race	Number	Percent
White	3,827	92.4%
Black or African American	35	0.8%
American Indian and Alaska Native	9	0.2%
Asian	20	0.5%
Native Hawaiian and Other Pacific Islander	0	0.0%
Some other race	22	0.5%
Two or more races	229	5.5%
Hispanic or Latino (of any race)	113	2.7%

=== 2010 census ===
As of the census of 2010, 3,991 people, 1,552 households, and 1,067 families were residing in the city. The population density was 1,691.1 inhabitants per square mile (652.9/km^{2}). The 1,695 housing units averaged 718.2/sq mi (277.3/km^{2}). The racial makeup of the city was 93.8% White, 3.5% African American, 0.5% Native American, 0.4% Asian, 0.6% from other races, and 1.3% from two or more races. Hispanics or Latinos of any race were 2.0% of the population.

Of 1,552 households, 33.4% had children under the age of 18 living with them, 55.9% were married couples living together, 9.3% had a female householder with no husband present, 3.6% had a male householder with no wife present, and 31.3% were not families. About 26.6% of all households were made up of individuals, and 13.9% had someone living alone who was 65 years of age or older. The average household size was 2.51 and the average family size was 3.04.

The median age in the city was 39.5 years. About 25.6% of residents were under the age of 18; 5.4% were 18 and 24; 25.9% were from 25 to 44; 23% were from 45 to 64, and 19.9% were 65 or older. The gender makeup of the city was 47.0% male and 53.0% female.

=== 2000 census ===
As of 2000, the median income for a household in the city was $50,932, and the median income for a family was $57,798. Males had a median income of $50,000 versus $29,758 for females. The per capita income for the city was $23,620. About 2.5% of families and 4.6% of the population were below the poverty line, including 3.2% of those under age 18 and 4.9% of those age 65 or over.

== Government ==
Linden has a council-manager government and a Downtown Development Authority. The municipality operates its own water system (wells).

The Loose Senior Citizen Center, which provides senior services and activities, is operated by a nonprofit. The center receives some funding from a Genesee County senior millage and from Southern Lakes Parks and Recreation. The Southern Lakes Regional Parks and Recreation District operates Linden's parks and recreation programs for Linden's residents.
