= Flushing High School (Michigan) =

Location
- 5039 Deland Rd; Flushing, Michigan 48433; United States; 43.0758°N 83.844°W

Information
- School district: Flushing Community Schools
- Superintendent: Matt Shanafelt
- Principal: Kevin Foltz
- Staff: 69.14 (FTE)
- Grades: 9-12
- Enrollment: 1,278 (2022–2023)
- Student to teacher ratio: 18.48
- Color
- Athletics conference: Flint Metro League, MHSAA
- Nickname: Raiders
- Website: fhs.flushingschools.org

Flushing High School is a four-year public high school in Flushing, Michigan, United States. It is operated by Flushing Community Schools.

Its sports teams are known as the Raiders. The school colors are orange and black. The principal is Kevin Foltz. Its newspaper is titled The Blazer and its yearbook is titled Perannos.

== History ==
On March 19, 1930, 125 students walked out of the high school to protest the school board's firing of superintendent Herbert V. Truemner. Truemner had been dismissed by the school board to take place at the end of the school year. The high school had 190 students at the time.

In 1998, the collapse of a cinder block wall in a new auditorium under construction at the school killed four construction workers.

In January 2020, Flushing High School opened a brand new gymnasium and weight center, called the Raider Fieldhouse.

== Feeder schools ==
=== Middle school ===
- Flushing Middle School

=== Elementary schools ===
- Elms Elementary
- Central Elementary
- Seymour Elementary
- Springview Elementary

== Notable alumni ==
- Jacob Morrison (born 2003), Minor league baseball pitcher, class of 2022
- Dayna Polehanki (born 1969), Michigan state senator, class of 1988
- Ira Terry Sayre (1858–1926), Michigan state senator, graduated with one of the school's first classes in 1878
