= Jacob Morrison =

American baseball player (born 2003)

Milwaukee Brewers
- Pitcher
- Born: September 13, 2003 (age 22); Saginaw, Michigan, U.S.
- Bats: Right Throws: Right

Career highlights and awards
- ABCA Pitcher of the Year Award (2025)

Jacob Steven Morrison (born September 13, 2003) is an American professional baseball pitcher in the Milwaukee Brewers organization. He played college baseball for the Coastal Carolina Chanticleers.

== Amateur career ==
Morrison was raised in Flushing, Michigan, where he attended Flushing High School and played baseball. After serving as Flushing's ace his senior year, Morrison played summer collegiate baseball with the Princeton WhistlePigs of the Appalachian League.

After high school, Morrison committed to play college baseball at Coastal Carolina University. Morrison made his debut for Coastal Carolina on February 18, 2023, pitching 5.0 innings with three hits allowed and nine strikeouts against Middle Tennessee. On the season, Morrison registered a 6–1 record with a 6.55 ERA and 68 strikeouts in 57 2/3 innings. Before his sophomore year, Morrison underwent Tommy John surgery on his right arm, causing him to miss the entire 2024 season.

Returning to play for Coastal Carolina in 2025, Morrison began the season with strong performances in March, including two games against Georgia Southern and Texas State, where he twice matched his career-high of ten strikeouts, with eight hits and zero runs allowed in a combined 14 2/3 innings. On April 4, Morrison set a collegiate career-high in innings pitched, going 8.0 innings with three hits and three strikeouts in a win against Arkansas State. During the season, Morrison was named as a semifinalist for the Golden Spikes Award. Morrison helped Coastal Carolina reach the College World Series, where in the second round, he became the third pitcher since 2011 to retire 16 or more consecutive batters in the CWS, pitching 7 2/3 innings with five hits and one earned run along with seven strikeouts against Oregon State. Ultimately, in Morrison's final collegiate game, he allowed a season-high five earned runs in the championship-clinching game for LSU during the CWS Finals. By the season's end, Morrison was named the Sun Belt Conference Pitcher of the Year, along with receiving the ABCA Pitcher of the Year Award. Morrison was also tabbed as a consensus All-American.

== Professional career ==
Morrison was selected by the Milwaukee Brewers in the third round with the 94th overall pick in the 2025 Major League Baseball draft. He signed with the Brewers for $697,500 and was subsequently assigned to the ACL Brewers of the Arizona Complex League. On April 28, 2026, Morrison was promoted to the Single-A Wilson Warbirds. On July 28, Morrison was further promoted to the High-A Wisconsin Timber Rattlers.
