= Flushing Riverview Park =

Park in Michigan, United States

- Interactive map of Flushing Riverview Park
- Location: Flushing, Michigan, United States
- Coordinates: 43°03′40.1″N 83°51′17.9″W
- Area: 7.4 acres (3.0 ha)

Flushing Riverview Park is a public park along the Flint River in the city of Flushing, Michigan. Riverview Park has a kayak/canoe access site into the Flint River. Along with river access, the park has a tennis court, basketball court, playgrounds, pavilions, amphitheater, walkways and open field.

== History ==
The first concrete bandstand was built in the late 1940s by the Flushing Chamber of Commerce. When originally built, it did not include a cover.

In 1947, the flats area now known as Riverview Park was proposed by businessman Harrison Miller. This area once included Millpond. The Village of Flushing, along with donations by Bernard Bueche, make the park possible.

Tucker Memorial Pool was dedicated on July 1, 1956. The pool was built with money donated to the city from the will of Max Dealton Tucker, who was born in Flushing.

In 1976 for the 200th birthday of the Nation, the Flushing Bicentennial Walkway, part of the Riverview Park was completed.

In 1994, with public support, a cover was added.

On July 31, 2013, at a cost of almost $200,000, 440 new seats were installed in front of the amphitheater. These seats replaced old wooden benches. The Rotary Club of Flushing spearheaded the project
