= Flushing Mutton Park =

City park in Flushing, Michigan, United States

Mutton Park
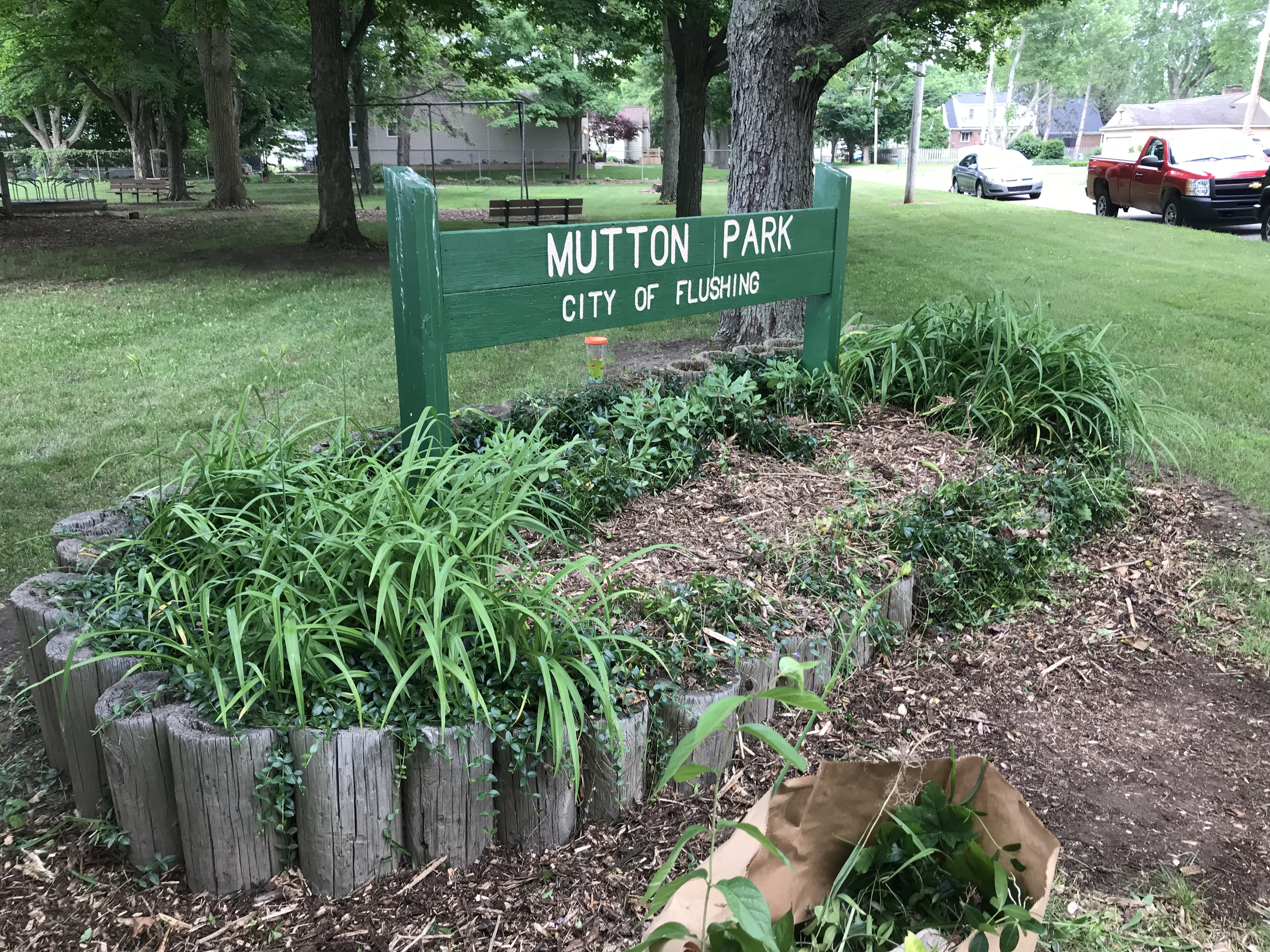
- The Mutton Park sign in 2018
- Interactive map of Mutton Park
- Type: Public park
- Location: Flushing, Michigan
- Coordinates: 43°03′59″N 83°49′59″W
- Area: 3.5 acres (1.4 ha)
- Created: 1921
- Operator: City of Flushing
- Status: Open all year

Mutton Park is a 3.5 acre city park located on the corner of Coutant and Chestnut Streets in the city of Flushing, Michigan. Bonnieview Court is located on the north side of the park. The park has a softball diamond, basketball court, playground and picnic area. This park is surrounded by residential on all sides.

== History ==
In the 1920s the village was desperately searching for a good water supply. It conducted tests on the site that is now the park. The village bought the land from Clarence Luce. In 1921 a water tower was erected, surrounded by five small well houses. This took up on the north section (now Bonnie View Court) and the south section was developed as "Waterworks park", not to be confused with the current Waterworks Park located on the north side of town.

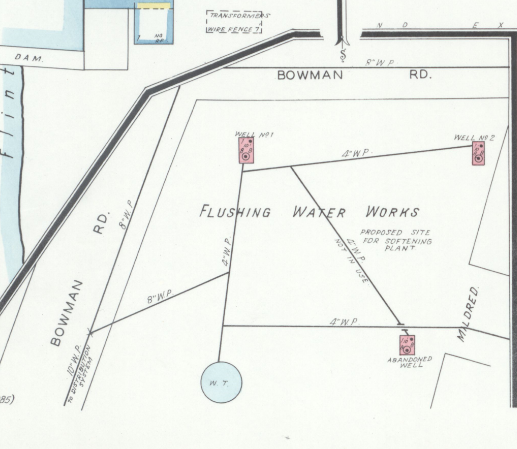
1934 map of north side of Mutton Park showing location of water tower.

William Mutton was a well known local farmer, a lumber yard operator and auctioneer. He loved to travel, visiting places in this and other countries. His residence was the cement block home at the north west corner of Main and Boman Streets. In 1927, following one of his trips, he received permission from the council to plant a grove of trees in the south section in honor of his wife. He outlined the plan for the grove from and inscription he had seen on a stone marker in England. "I am constrained to plant a grove, to please the lady of my love. This ample grove is to compose 25 trees in 12 straight rows. Five trees in each tow must I place, or I shall have never see her face". Mutton gained the services of Gordon Bedford, a graduate civil engineer to work out the mathematics of the design. Bedford also went to the site and staked out the location of each tree. Eighteen maples were secured from the farm of F. M. Confer and seven elms from the farm of Judd Lee. Village employees gave Mutton a hand in digging and planting the trees. Mutton carefully guarded the young grove, carrying water from a well near the water tower. He kept them well pruned and growing straight up. After a few years they provided shade where he used to site and rest on a sunny afternoon. Later officially named Mutton Park.
