= Ira Terry Sayre =

American politician

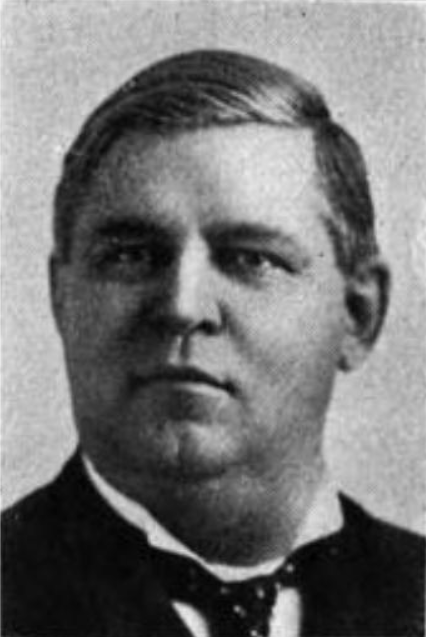

Member of the Michigan Senate from the 13th district
- In office January 1, 1899 – January 1, 1901
- Preceded by: George W. Teeple
- Succeeded by: William S. Pierson

Personal details
- Born: March 6, 1858 Hector, New York, U.S.
- Died: March 6, 1926 (aged 68) Flushing, Michigan, U.S.
- Party: Republican
- Spouse: Julia E. Niles (m. 1884)
- Education: University of Michigan

Ira Terry Sayre (March 6, 1858 – March 6, 1926) was a Michigan politician.

== Early life ==
Sayre was born in Hector, New York, on March 6, 1858, to parents Augustus and Sarah Evelyn Sayre. He and his family moved to Michigan in 1864. Sayre graduated from as a part of Flushing High School's first class in 1878. Sayre attended both Michigan Agricultural College and the University of Michigan Law School from 1880 to 1881, but did not graduate.

== Career ==
Sayre served as the Flushing Township clerk for seven years. Sayre served as justice of the peace in Flushing, Michigan, from 1888 to 1892. Sayre was admitted to the bar on June 12, 1881. He then started practicing in Flushing, Michigan. After organizing the Peoples State Bank in Flushing, Michigan, and served as its first president. On November 8, 1898, Sayre was elected to the Michigan Senate where he represented the 13th district from January 1, 1899, to January 1, 1901.

== Personal life ==
On August 5, 1884, Sayre married Julia E. Niles. Together they had three children. Sayre was a number of multiple Masonic organizations, including the Shrine.

== Death ==
Sayre died on March 6, 1926, in Flushing, Michigan. He was interred at the Flushing City Cemetery on March 8, 1926.
