= Halley H. Prosser =

American politician

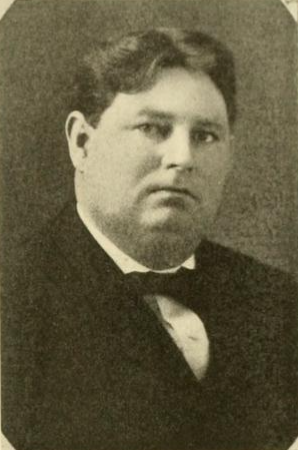

Member of the Michigan House of Representatives from the Genesee County 1st district
- In office January 1, 1905 – January 1, 1909
- Preceded by: Edward A. Walker
- Succeeded by: Elmer G. Wheeler

Personal details
- Born: March 13, 1870 Lansing, Michigan
- Died: December 22, 1921 (aged 51) Flint, Michigan
- Party: Republican
- Spouse: Winifred O. Ottaway

Halley H. Prosser (March 13, 1870 – December 22, 1921) was a Michigan politician.

== Early life ==
Halley H. Prosser was born on March 13, 1870, in Lansing, Michigan. Halley was the youngest of three siblings. His father was a lawyer named Edwin A. Prosser and his mother was Esther A. Elsworth. Halley received a public school education in Lansing and South Lyon, Michigan. Halley later studied pharmacy in university. In 1889, Halley passed the Michigan Board of Pharmacy's examination. In 1893, Halley moved to Flushing, Michigan.

== Career ==
In Flushing, Prosser worked as a clerk in the drug business for around four years. After four more years in the pharmaceutical business, Prosser gained employment in the grocery business, working for J. E. Ottaway & Company. On November 8, 1904, Prosser was elected to the Michigan House of Representatives where he represented the Genesee County 1st district from January 1, 1905, to January 1, 1909. In the book The Men of '05, editor Harry M. Nimmo poked fun at Prosser's weight and nosiness among other perceived character flaws.

== Personal life ==
On January 6, 1897, Prosser married Winifred O. Ottaway. Winifred was the daughter of James E. Ottaway. Prosser was a Freemason and a member of the Odd Fellows.

== Death ==
Prosser died on December 22, 1921, in his home in Flint, Michigan.
