= Edmund G. Love =

American writer (1912–1990)

- Born: February 14, 1912; Flushing, Michigan
- Died: August 30, 1990 (aged 78); Flint, Michigan
- Education: Bachelor of Arts; Master of Fine Arts
- Alma mater: University of Michigan
- Occupations: Author; Teacher
- Spouses: Anna V. Worts (1956-1990)
- Children: Shannon Gay Love; Nicholas Gregory Love
- Writing career
- Period: 1949-1987
- Genres: Non-Fiction; Autobiography; Military history Historical fiction Satire
- Notable work: Subways Are for Sleeping

Edmund G. Love (February 14, 1912 – August 30, 1990) was an American author. He was the author of 20 books including Hanging On, A Small Bequest, and Subways Are for Sleeping, which was the basis for the Broadway musical of the same name.

== Early life and education ==
Love grew up in Flushing, Michigan, and spent much of his childhood watching and interacting with the train system and engineers that worked on trains in the town. Later, Love wrote about the difficulties of living up to the legend of his family. His father had played Major League Baseball, one grandfather had competed as a heavyweight boxer and fought in a match against John L. Sullivan, and another grandfather was a professional billiards player who came close to beating Willie Hoppe in an official match. Love received a Bachelor of Arts and a Master of Fine Arts degree from the University of Michigan. During his attendance, he competed for literary prizes with rival schoolmates such as Arthur Miller and Betty Smith.

During the difficult times of the Great Depression, Love was laid off from his job at an automobile plant in 1934. He inherited some lakefront property from his relatives that year and spent the summer there with his friend George. Overall, the experience was not a positive one, and Love used those events in his later book, A Small Bequest.

== Career ==
During World War II, he served in the Army and later on headed the team that recorded military histories of the war in the Pacific. This led to his love for writing, especially in freelance publications.

=== Subways Are for Sleeping ===
The background of Love's 1958 book Subways Are for Sleeping involved him going through the experience of having to sleep on subway trains in New York City during the time period where he had been homeless. The focus of the book was the people that he met in similar situations, ranging from street musicians to backpacking tourists, that he referred to as the "Twilight People". The book's title came about from a quote by Henry Shelby, a person who lived on the subway and explored Manhattan during the daytime. The novel would later be adopted into a Broadway musical of the same name after the rights for the production were bought from Love by Jule Styne in February 1958.

=== Goal to eat from every restaurant in New York City Yellow Pages ===
During the time period where he was homeless in 1952 and afterwards when his book became successful, Love began going alphabetically through the Manhattan version of the yellow pages and every restaurant listed inside. At the beginning, he had been working in the cheese department of a supermarket located in Morristown, New Jersey, and earning around $40 per week, which he preferably spent on his job-hunting day at a restaurant named Shines. Eventually, he decided he wanted more variety and was recommended by a police officer to look in the yellow pages for options. While he started his alphabetical tour almost as a joke, Love stated that he also kept going in order to spite the expensive taste of his ex-wife. By the early 1970s, he had completed the over 6,000 locations listed in the directory and began going through the new restaurants that had opened since he began.

=== Hanging On ===
A far later publication of his, Love's 1988 book Hanging On is another historical life anecdote covering his early life with his family and how they survived the Great Depression together while living in Flint. The book itself became a piece of scholarly coverage of American history and would be used in academic classes at the University of Michigan when discussing that period of time.

=== Other works ===
Some of Love's other works would be used for film and television productions, including the film Destination Gobi and the story that the Naked City episode "Goodbye My Lady Love" is based on.

A collection of Love's work, including his diaries, photographs, and correspondences, are housed at the Bentley Historical Library.

== Personal life ==
Love had a daughter, Shannon Gay Love, with his first wife. They divorced in 1949. He remarried to Anna V. Worts on September 21, 1956. Together they had a son, Nicholas Gregory Love, and four grandchildren. Love died at St. Joseph's Hospital in Flint, Michigan, on August 30, 1990, after attempting recovery from a heart attack at home.

== Bibliography ==
- The 27th Infantry Division in World War II Infantry Journal Press, 1949
- The Hourglass, A History Of The 7th Infantry Division In World War II Infantry Journal Press, 1950
- Seizure of the Gilberts and Marshalls, with Philip Crowl, 1955
- Subways Are for Sleeping Signet, 1958
- War is a Private Affair Harcourt Brace & Co, 1959
- Arsenic and Red Tape Signet, 1960
- The Beautiful and Anxious Maidens, 1962
- An end to bugling Harper & Row, 1963
- The Situation in Flushing Wayne State University Press, 1965
- A shipment of Tarts Doubleday, 1967
- Set-up Doubleday, 1980
- Hanging on Or, How to Get Through a Depression and Enjoy Life Wayne State University Press, 1987
- A Small Bequest Wayne State University Press, 1987
