= Main Street Historic District (Flushing, Michigan) =

- U.S. National Register of Historic Places
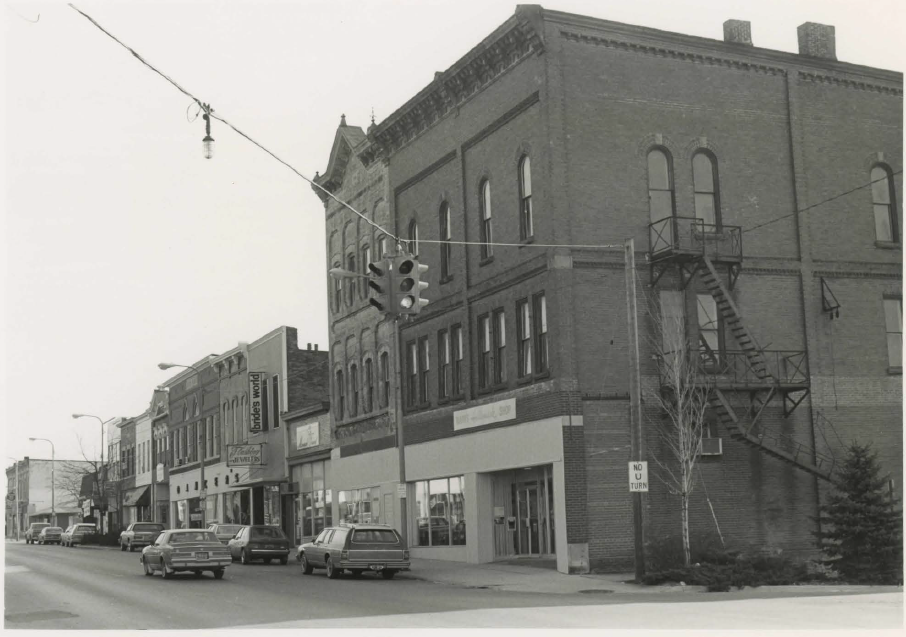

- Location within Michigan Location within the United States
- Interactive map
- Location: Main St. from Maple to 628 Main St. Flushing, Michigan
- Coordinates: 43°03′47″N 83°51′01″W
- NRHP reference No.: 83000846
- Added to NRHP: June 20, 1983

The Main Street Historic District, located in Flushing Michigan, includes buildings on Main St from Maple to 628 (East) Main St. Properties in this district are listed on the National Register of Historic Places. 82 structures located on 22.4 acres of land create the district with commercial buildings reflecting ornate Italianate and early twentieth-century styles constructed between 1850 and 1918 and residences exhibiting a wide variety of Greek Revival, Italianate, Queen Anne, Colonial Revival, and Bungaloid styles and their vernacular derivatives built from 1850 to 1932.. Properties we added as part of the Main Street Historic Commercial District and the Genesee County MRA (Multiple Resource Area).

== Notable Buildings ==
=== Henry H. Chatters & Charles N. Talbot Building ===
100 E Main St. Built 1889. Three story Italianate brick building.

In partnership with Charles Talbot, Henry Chatters opened a general mercantile business on the corner of Main and Maple. The building was built in 1889. The cost of the building was $8000. The first floor was used for their business. The second floor functioned as a dining room and dance hall. The 3rd floor was built as a headquarters for a Masonic lodge. The building was sold to the Masonic lodge in 1911. From 1920 to 1959 Bueches Bros., now Bueches Food World, used the first floor as a grocery store.

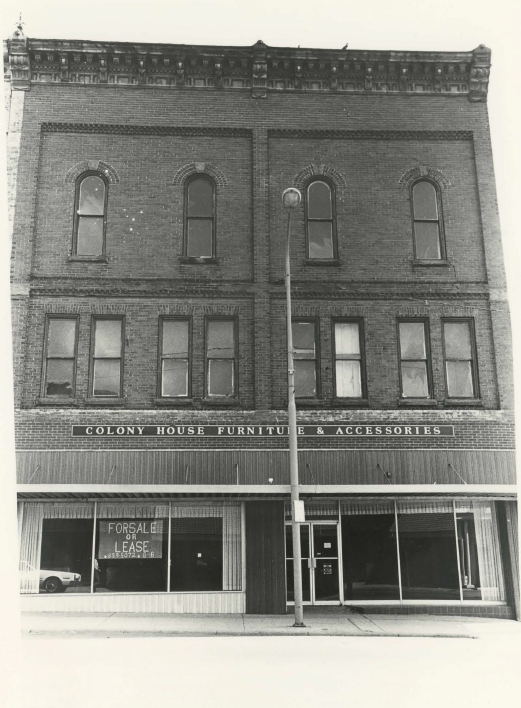

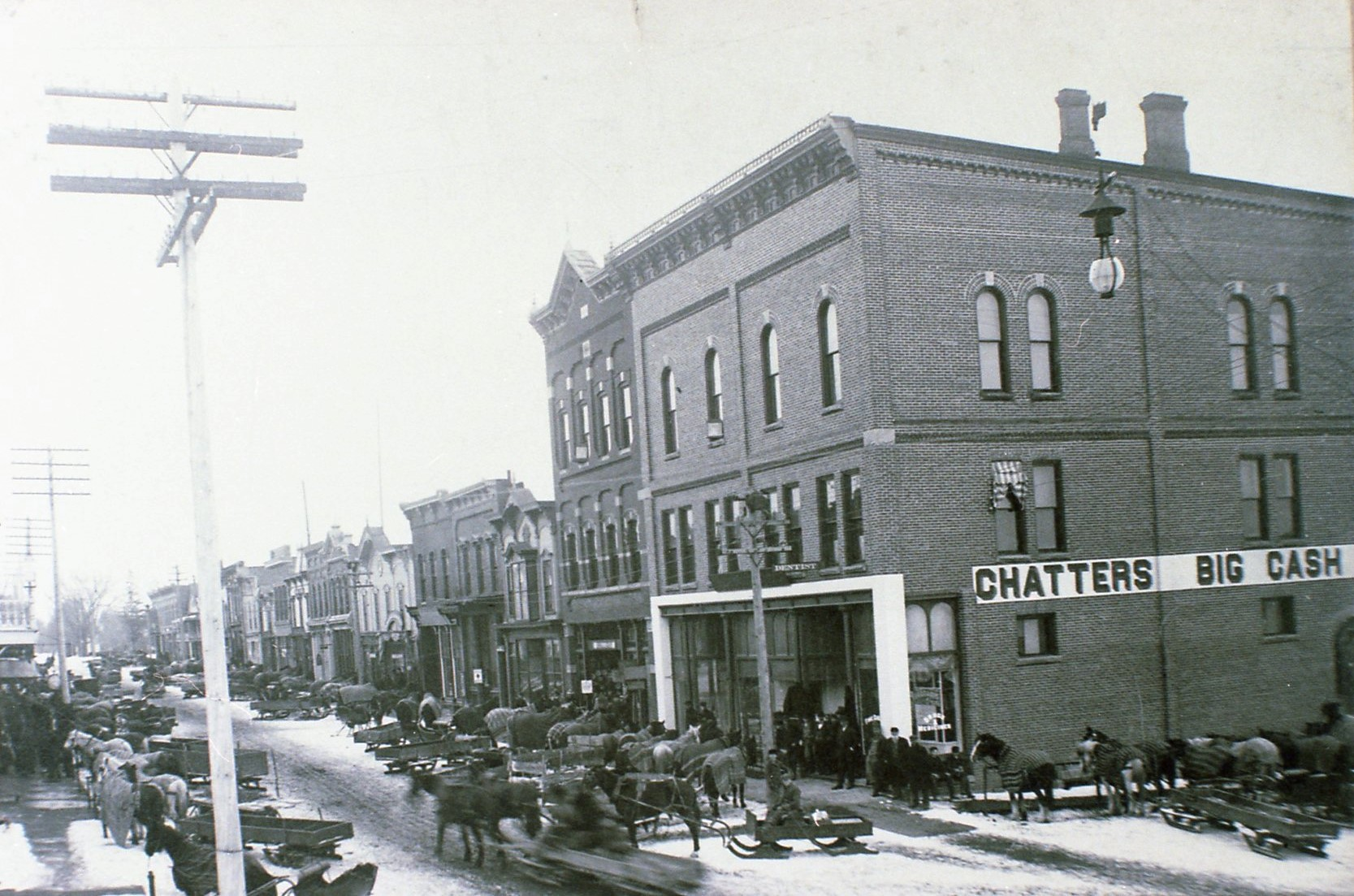

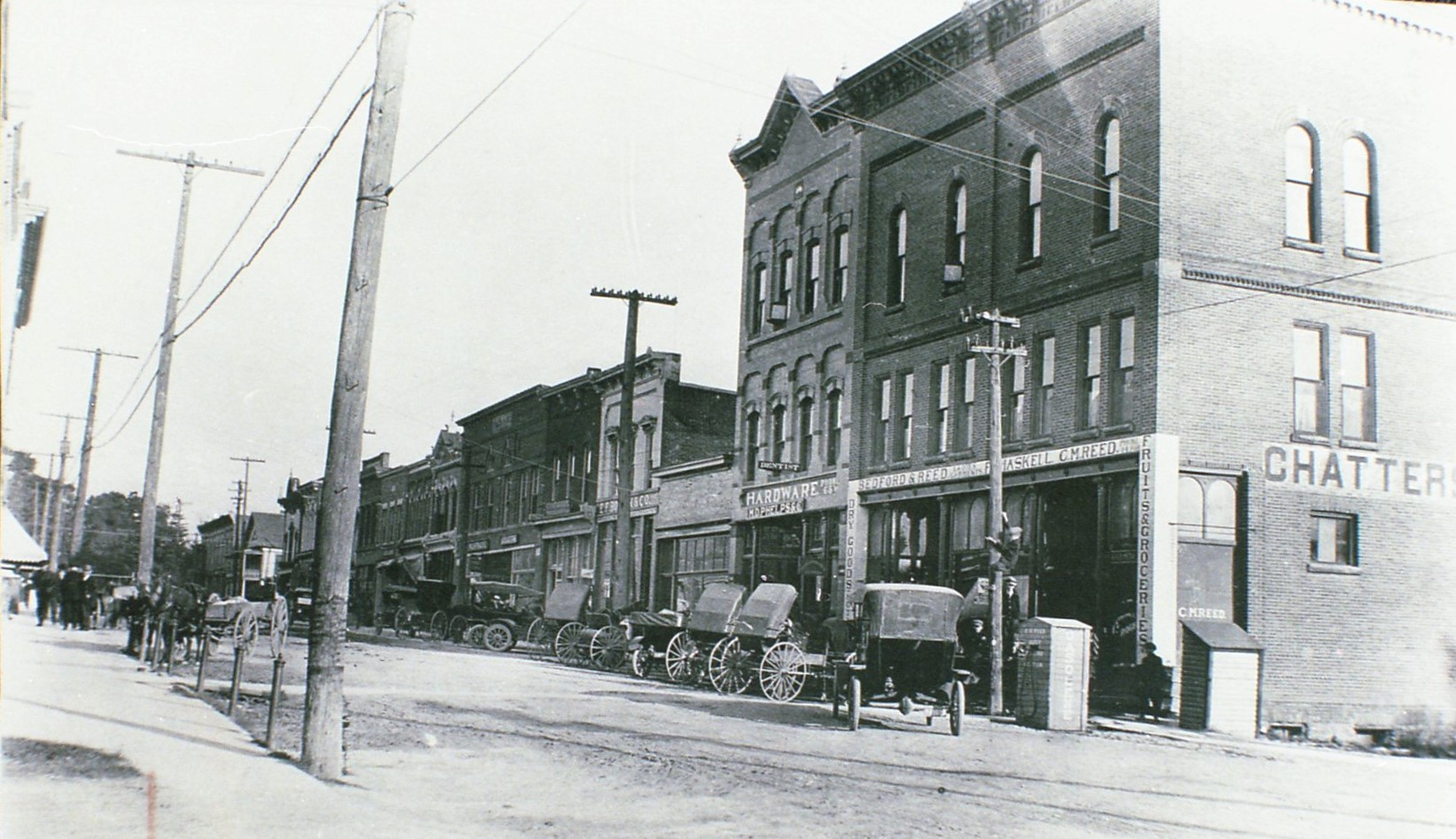

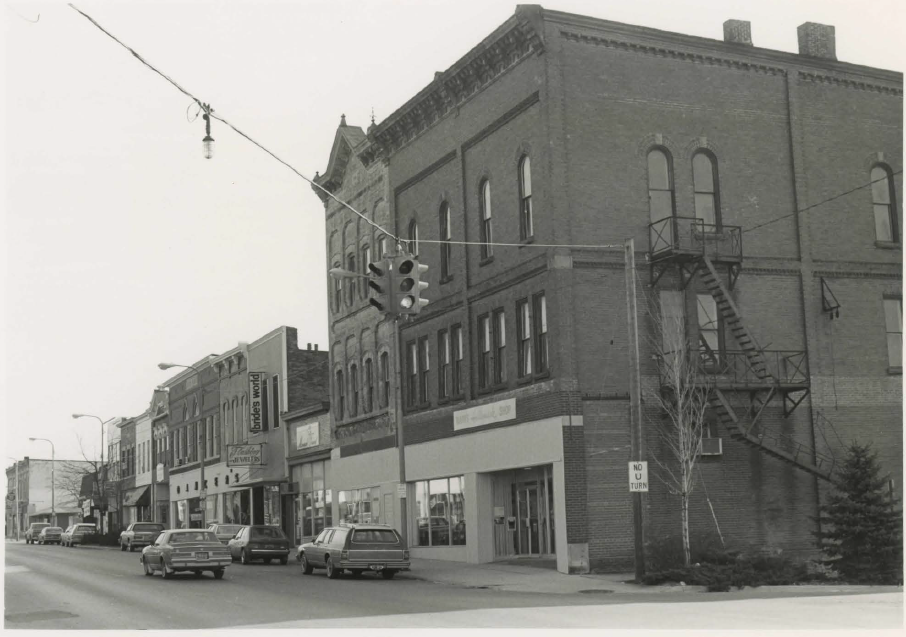

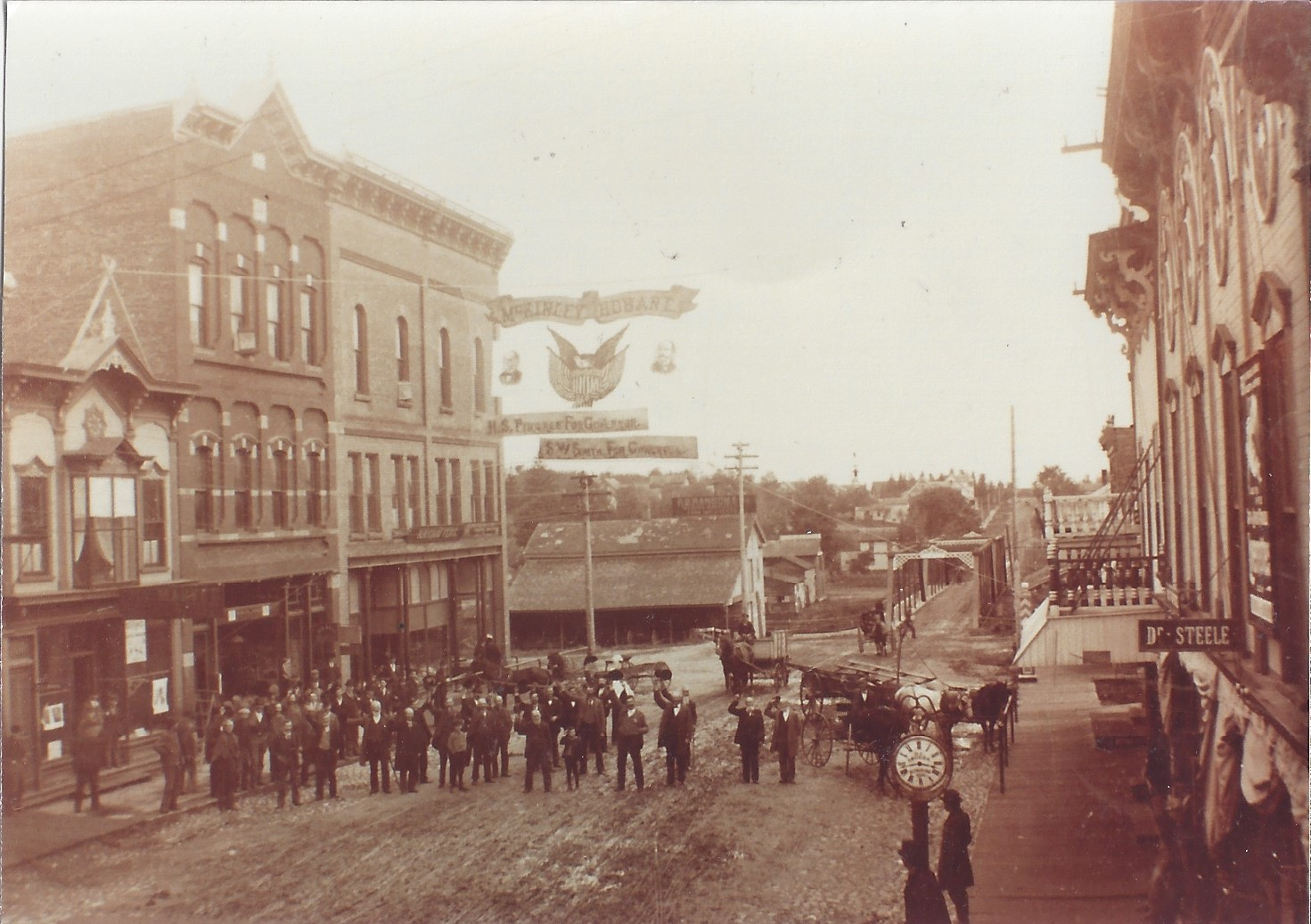

=== Laurel House Hotel ===
101 Main St. Built 1890–1895. Two story Italianate brick building.

Built on the site of a wood-framed hotel that burned in 1878. The wood building was purchased by Mary Passmore in the early 1870s. After the fire, a new, three-story brick building was erected by Mary. The three-story brick building was used as a hotel. The top story was removed after a fire on September 21, 1890, and was cut down to two stories. By the mid-1920s the building was no longer used as a hotel. The Flushing Observer occupied the second story from 1894 to 1919.

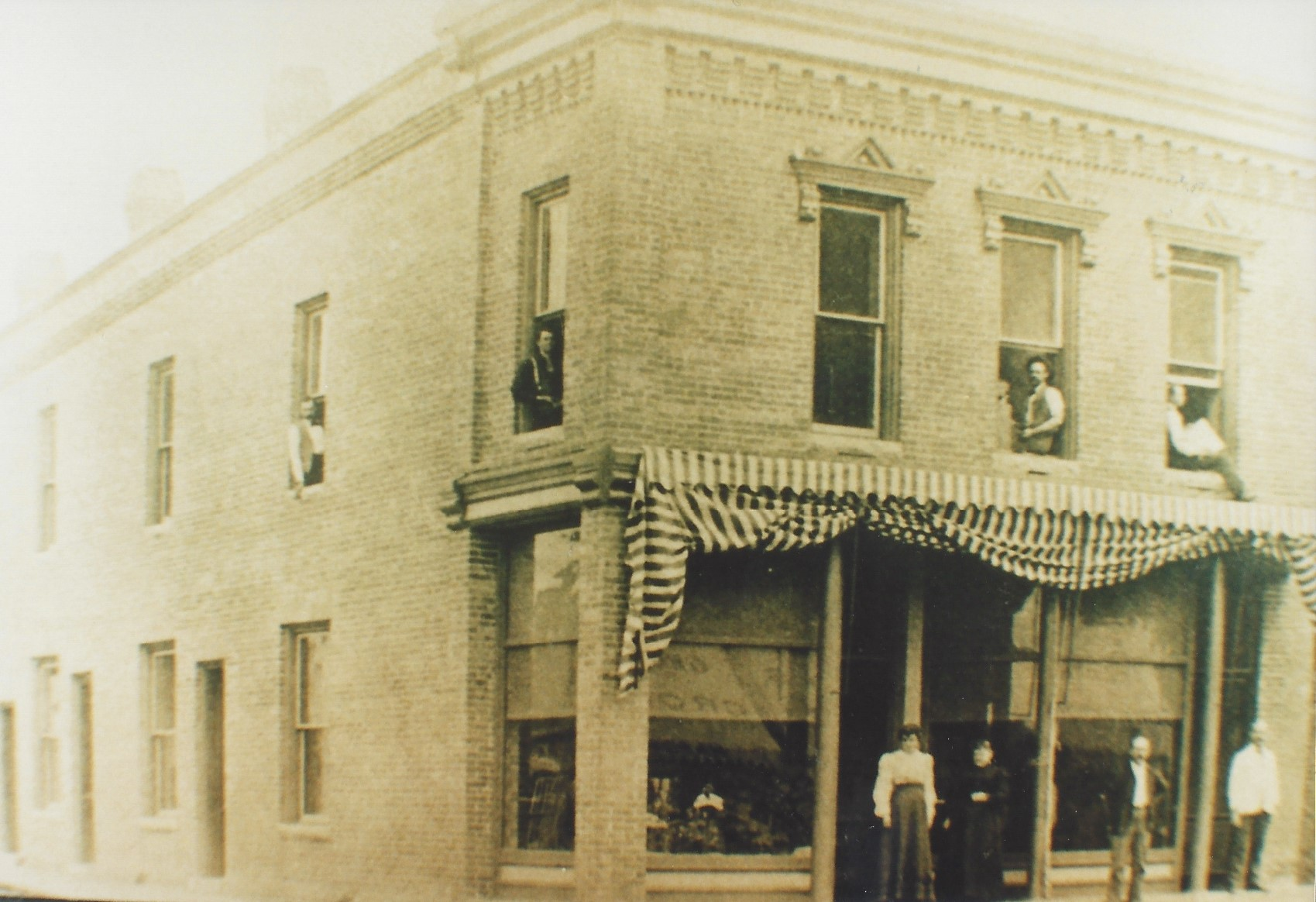

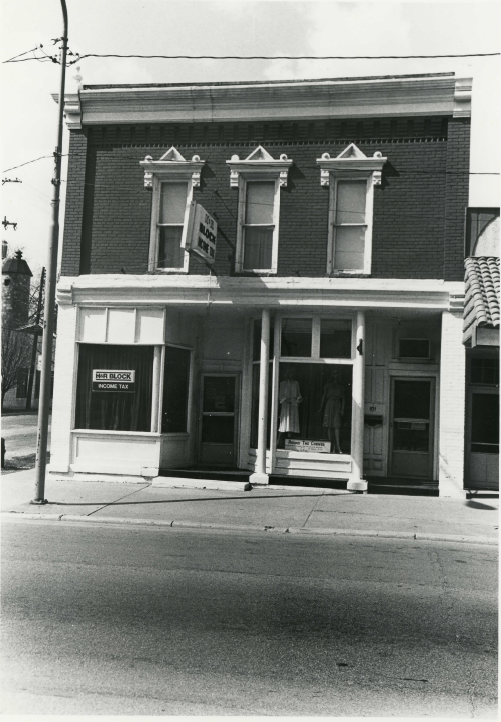

=== Arza Niles & Lyman Davie Building ===
104 Main St. Built in 1886. Three-story Italianate brick building.

Built by Arza Niles and Lyman Davie in 1886. The third story was added in 1889 for the Odd Fellows lodge and used until 1916.

=== Davie's Opera House ===
107 E Main St. Built in 1882.

Built in 1882 by Lyman E Davie. Contains the first cornerstone ever laid in Flushing. The cornerstone was secured from the site of the Flushing Stone Quarry. Davie's Opera House was located on the second floor. The building originally had a Balcony. The building was purchased in 1916 by the Odd Fellows lodge.

=== Franklin A Niles Building ===
112-114 Main St Built 1890–1900.

A two-story brick building built for Daniel Cotcher and Franklin Niles. Cotcher and Niles ran successful hardware business since 1865 that moved to this location.

=== J. B French Building ===
115 Main St

Built 1889-1890 by James French to house his hardware business.

=== John L. Green/Jacob Kimmel Building/Corinthian Hall ===
137 E Main St. Listed as 135. Built 1850-1860 Early wood-framed building. Brick exterior added in 1891.Two story Italianate brick veneer building.

Originally built by John L. Green as a wood framed blacksmith shop. Later its walls were sheathed with a brick veneer. Kimmel acquired the building in 1880 and operated his business there. The second floor was called Corinthian Hall. The room at the rear of the building was once used to house a fire engine. It is the only pioneer wooden building in existence in Flushing.

=== Flushing Grange and Observer Building ===
208 - 214 E Main St. Built 1889

Built in 1890 the Grange building and 3 adjoining were all built at the same time. The second build for the Perry Bros mercantile business, third for George Hall, a Flint businessman and the fourth by Joseph Davis & Sons for implement sales. One time used as an outlet for Durant-Dort Carriage Co. The Flushing Observer moved into 214 in 1919.

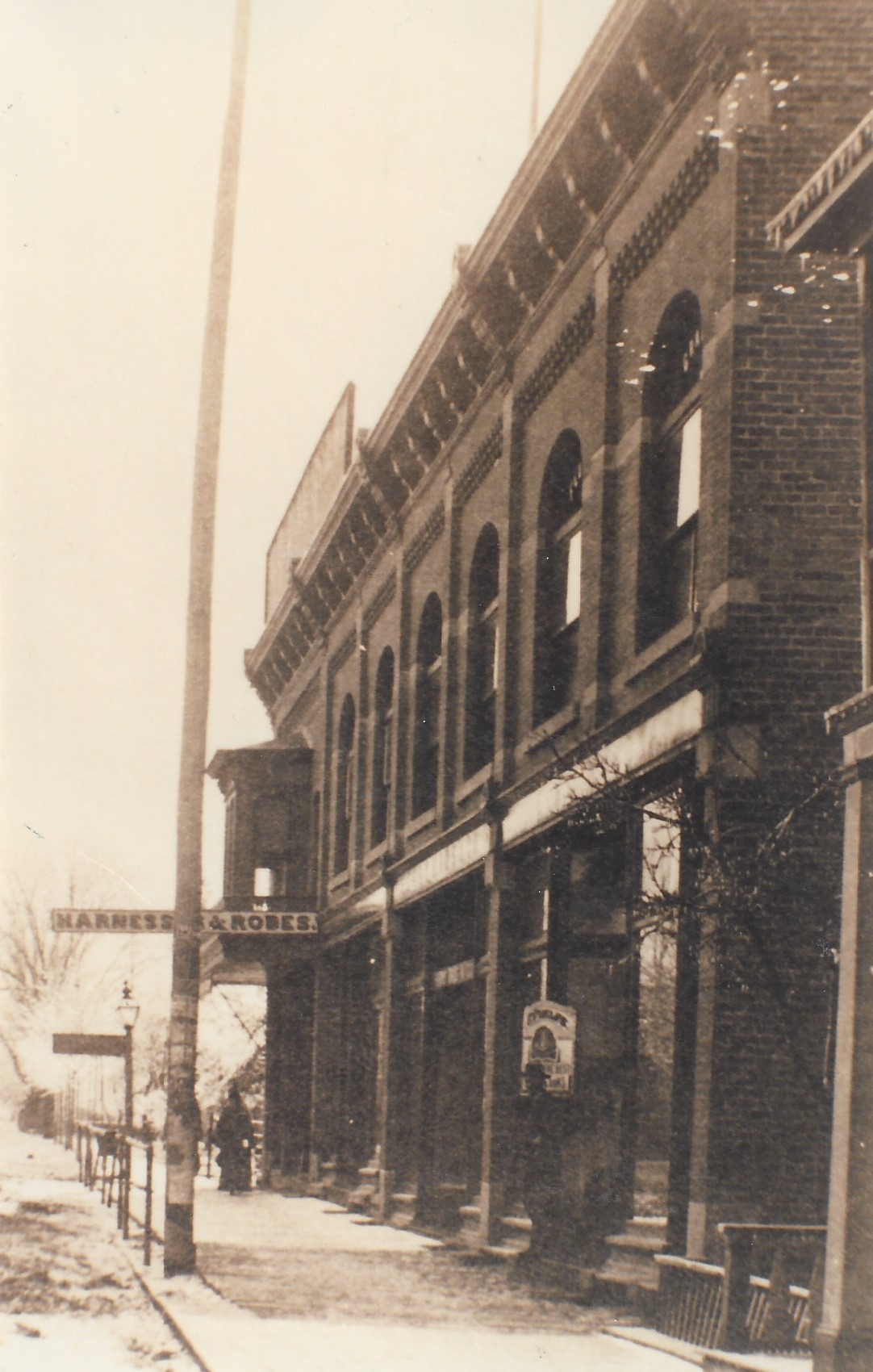

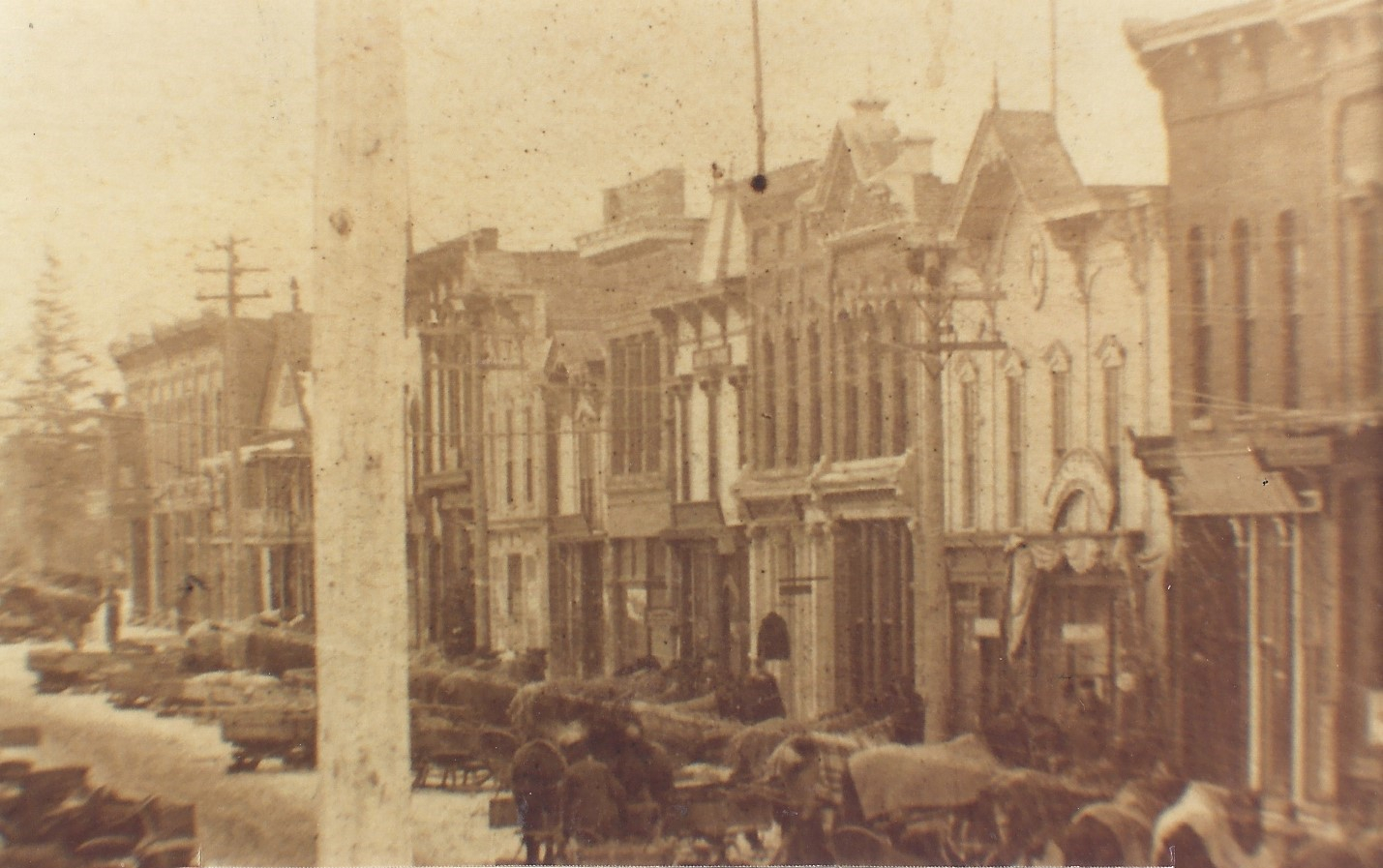

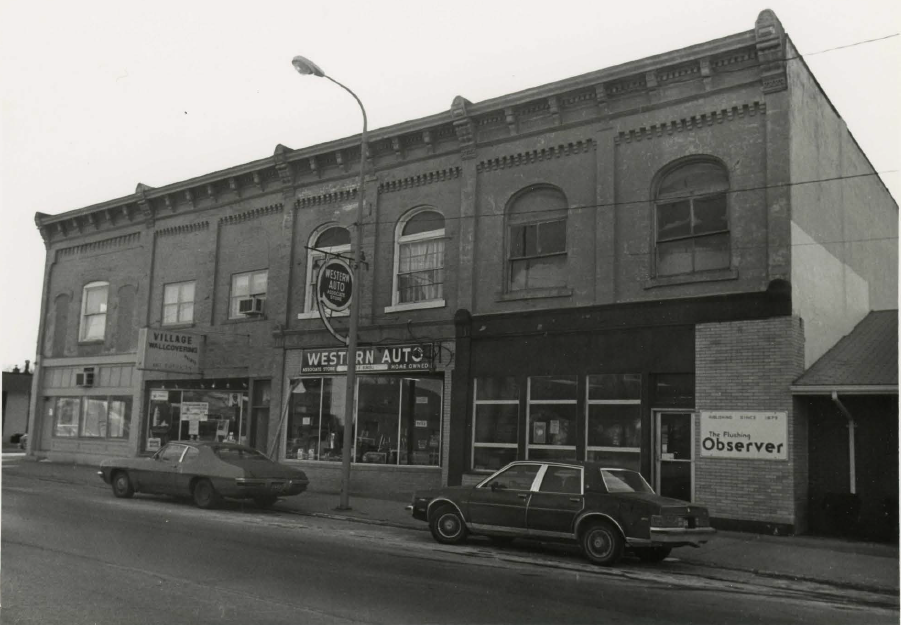

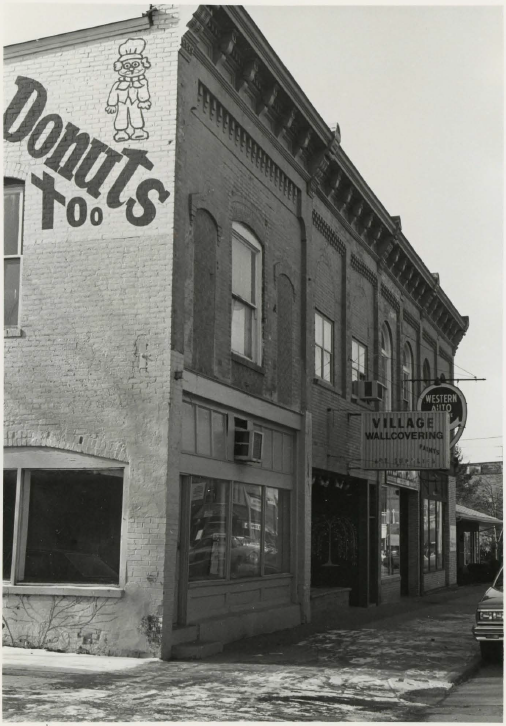

=== Presbyterian Church/Community Center ===
309 E Main St. Built in 1861 to 1864.

Construction started in 1861 but delayed because of the Civil War. The building was completed in 1864 with the steeple added in 1865. Church closed in 1921 and was donated to the city for use as city hall. The steeple was destroyed in 1934 by a cyclone.

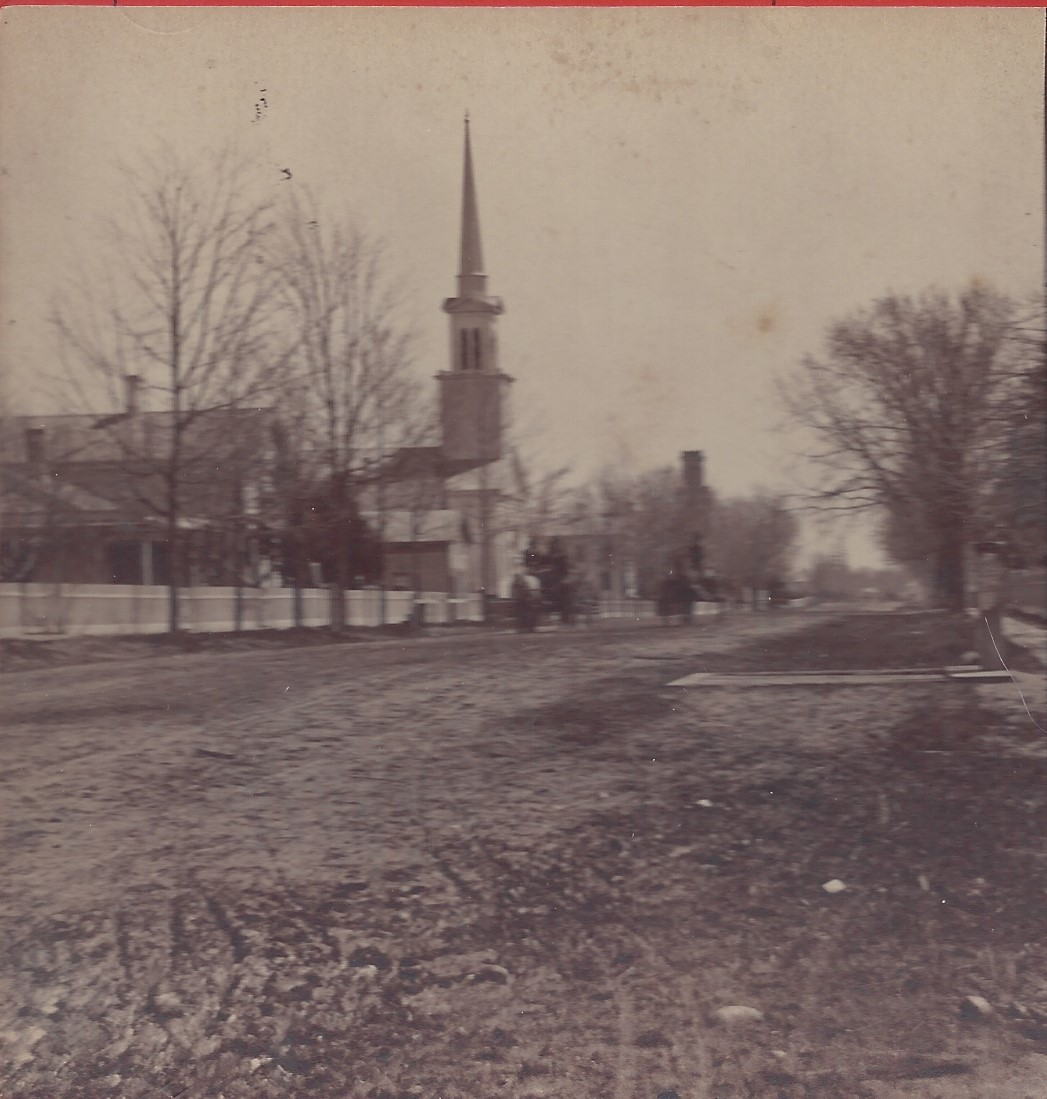

== Gallery ==
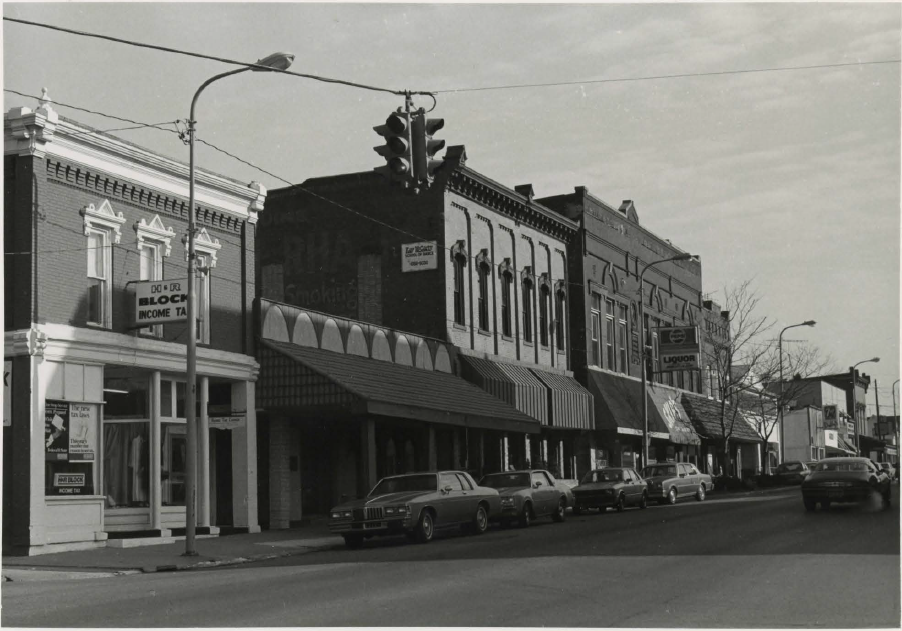

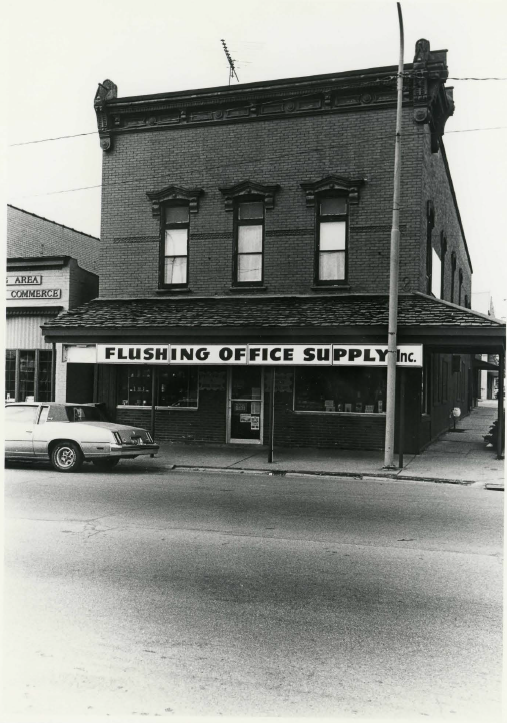

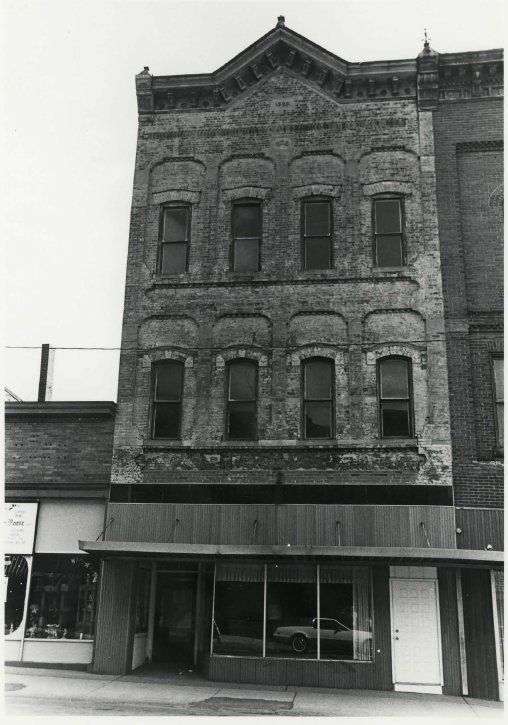

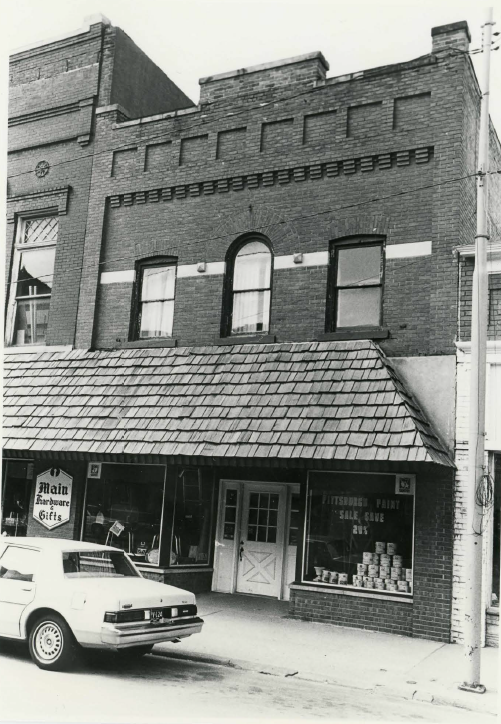

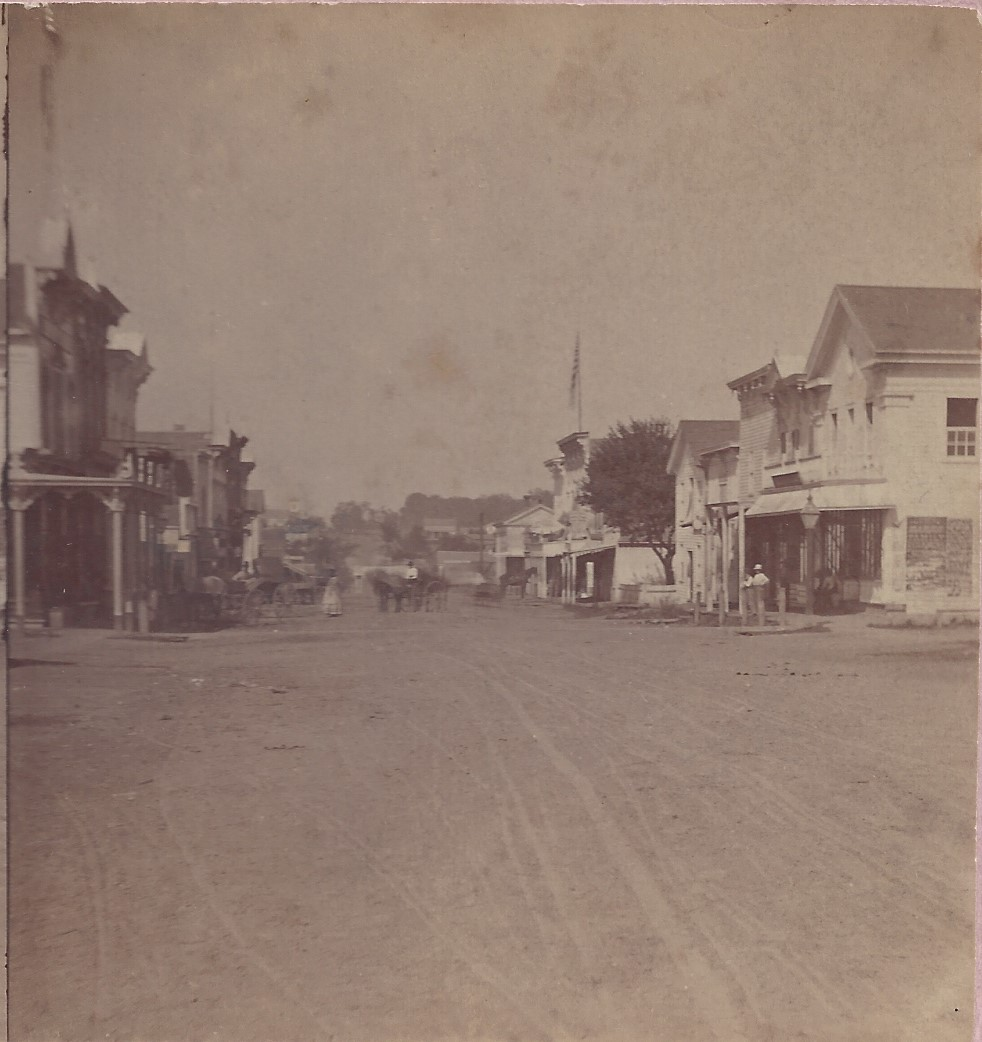

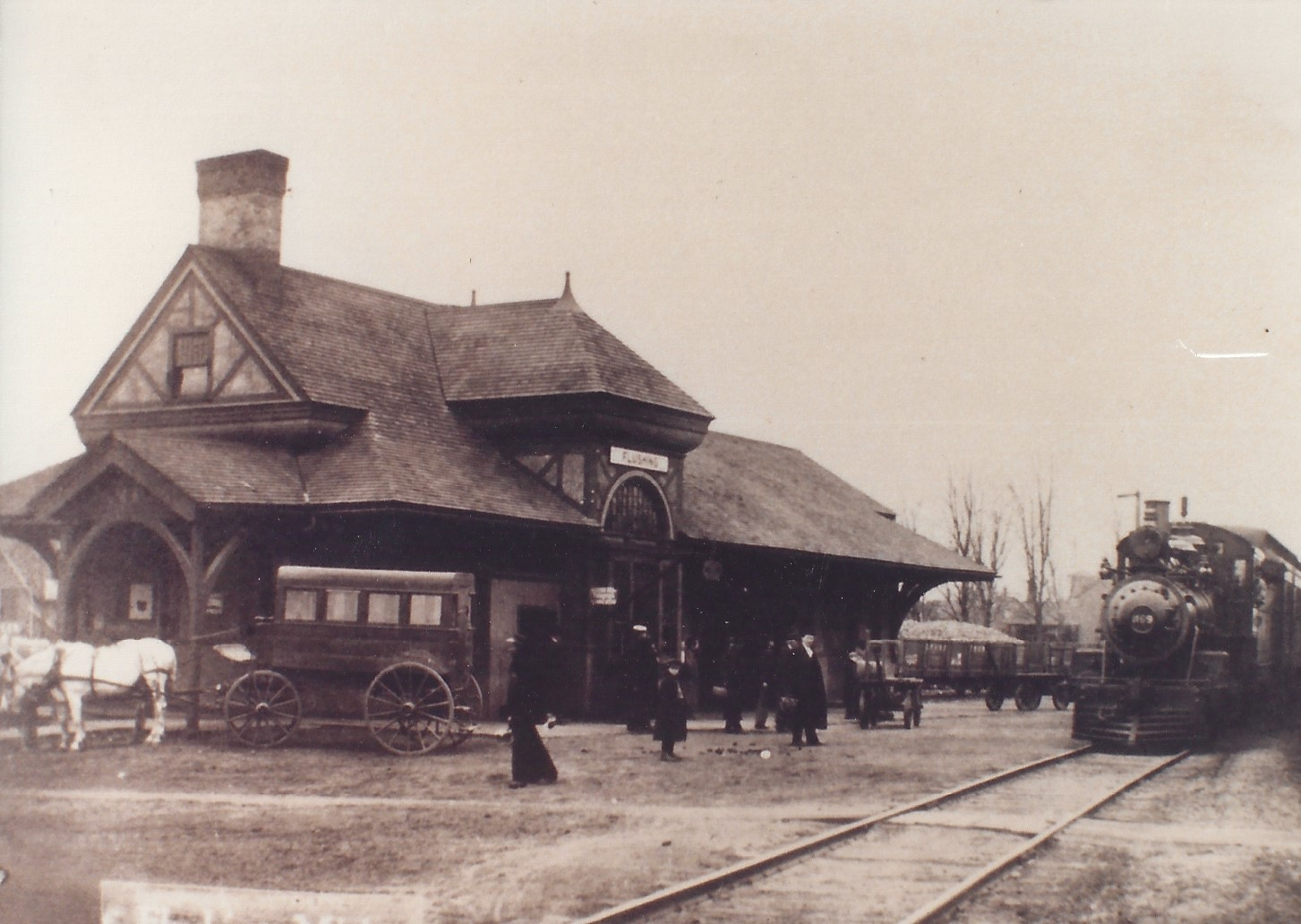

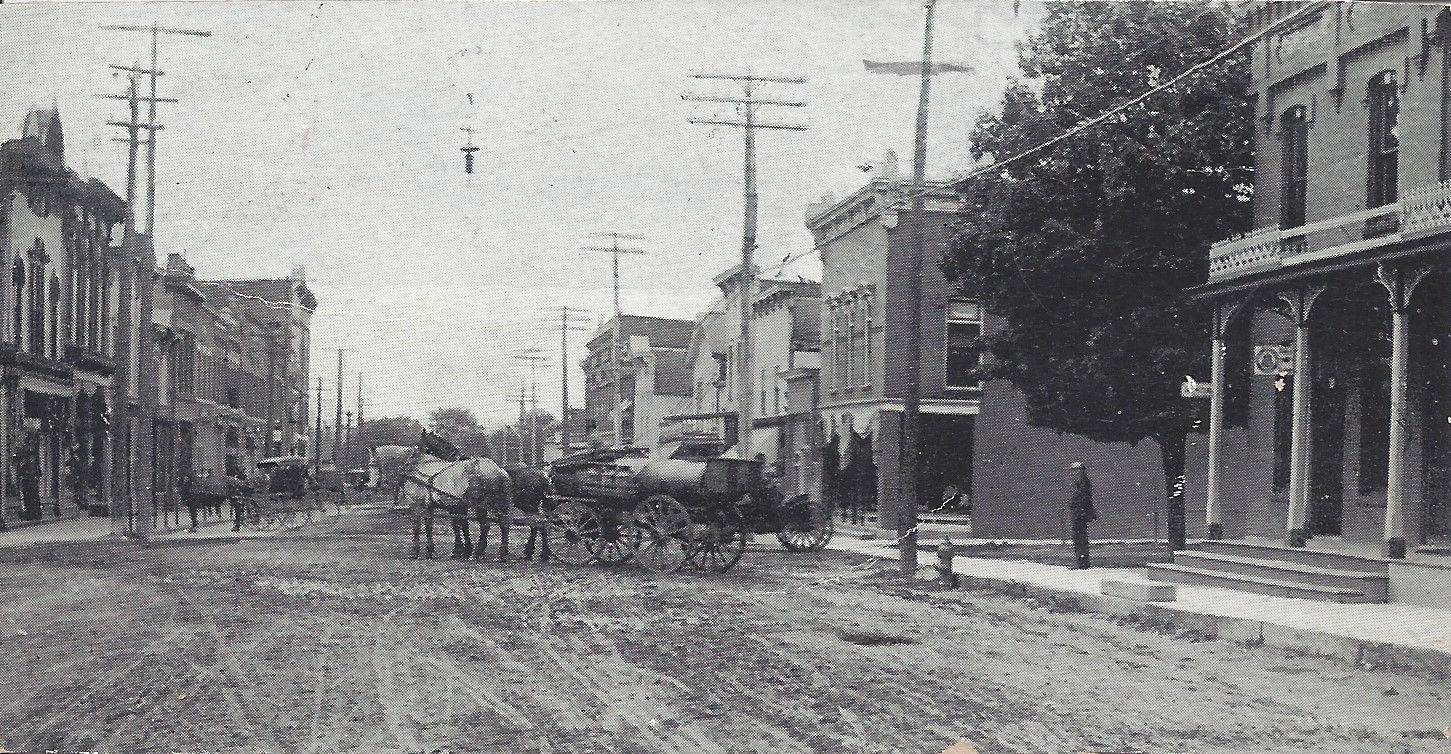
