= Destination Gobi =

1953 film by Robert Wise

- Theatrical release poster
- Directed by: Robert Wise
- Screenplay by: Everett Freeman
- Based on: Ninety Saddles for Kengtu; 1952 Collier's by Edmund G. Love
- Produced by: Stanley Rubin
- Starring: Richard Widmark; Don Taylor; Casey Adams; Murvyn Vye
- Narrated by: Richard Widmark
- Cinematography: Charles G. Clarke
- Edited by: Robert Fritch
- Music by: Sol Kaplan
- Production company: 20th Century Fox
- Distributed by: 20th Century Fox
- Release date: March 20, 1953
- Running time: 90 minutes
- Country: United States
- Language: English
- Budget: $1,340,000
- Box office: $1.2 million (US rentals)

Destination Gobi is a 1953 American Technicolor World War II film released by 20th Century-Fox. It was produced by Stanley Rubin, directed by Robert Wise (his first color feature film), and stars Richard Widmark and Don Taylor.

The film is about the Sino-American Cooperative Organization (SACO), referred to as Sino-American Combined Operations in the film.

Actor Ernest Borgnine has stated in interviews that he believed that this film, and Widmark's role of CPO Sam McHale, were the basis of the role of Quentin McHale in Borgnine's 1960s television show McHale's Navy.

== Plot ==
The film's foreword reads:

In the Navy records in Washington, there is an obscure entry reading "Saddles for Gobi." This film is based on the story behind that entry, one of the strangest stories of World War II.

The Navy created a meteorology command in order to provide accurate forecasts for operations in the Pacific War. Lt. Cmdr. Wyatt and CPO Sam McHale are detailed to the most remote station in the Gobi Desert deep inside Inner Mongolia. For McHale, who is fresh off a cruise on "The Big E" and itching to get back on the water, the desert is the last place he wants to be.

One evening, Mongolian nomads led by Kengtu set up camp at the station's oasis. Despite cultural differences, the two groups settle into an uneasy co-existence. Seaman Jenkins, an ex-cowboy, muses that the Mongols would make an excellent cavalry troop. Hoping to persuade the Mongols to join them against the Japanese, McHale requisitions 60 Army-issue saddles. They soon arrive and the Mongols appear delighted. Later, however, Japanese planes bomb and strafe the combined oasis camp, killing Wyatt and several Mongols. When the Mongols abandon the camp, the Americans, now alone and defenceless, begin to evacuate 800 miles east across the Gobi to the sea.

McHale and the men reach an oasis where Chinese traders are camped, and find the Mongols again, who surrender their saddles as they no longer feel worthy of the gift due to their abandonment. Nose-Ring trades the saddles for camels and agrees to lead the Americans to the coast. En route, Nose-Ring and the traders attempt to overrun the Americans, who are saved by both their own guards, and by the Mongols returning. Kengtu explains that he abandoned the station to protect his people from the Japanese "birds in the sky." In return for his followers keeping their saddles, Kengtu offers to escort the Americans to the sea if they disguise themselves in Mongol dress. All goes well until they reach the Japanese-occupied city of Sangchien, China, where Kengtu leads McHale's unit into a trap where they are captured by Japanese soldiers, who transport them to a prisoner-of-war camp on China's coast. There, the officer in charge decides that because they are not in uniform, they will be treated as spies.

However, one of Kengtu's men, Wali-Akhun, allows himself to be arrested while wearing a stolen American uniform. Wali reveals to McHale and his men that Kengtu has arranged for their escape and gives them wire-cutters he smuggled in. That night, they break out and head for the docks, where Kengtu is waiting with a Chinese junk. The wily Kengtu explains to McHale that their capture was a ploy to get the Japanese to transport them to the ocean. They set sail for Okinawa and are later spotted by U.S. Navy patrol planes and rescued. McHale is awarded the Navy Cross, and Kengtu and Wali are flown in an admiral's transport plane to re-join their people. There, McHale and his men present the Mongols with 60 brand-new, navy blue saddle blankets emblazoned with the logo: "The First U.S. Navy Mongolian Cavalry."

== Cast ==
- Richard Widmark as CPO Samuel T. McHale
- Don Taylor as Jenkins
- Casey Adams as Walter Landers
- Murvyn Vye as Kengtu
- Darryl Hickman as Wilbur 'Coney' Cohen
- Earl Holliman as Frank Swenson
- Martin Milner as Elwood Halsey
- Ross Bagdasarian Sr. (credited as Ross Bagdasarian) as Paul Sabatello
- Judy Dan as Nura-Salu (as Judy Dann)
- Rodolfo Acosta as Tomec
- Russell Collins as Lt. Cmdr. Hobart Wyatt
- Leonard Strong as Wali-Akhun
- Edgar Barrier as Yin Tang, aka Nose-Ring, unscrupulous camel trader, (uncredited)

== Production ==
The film is loosely based on actual events. The weather station in the Gobi was considered the "crown jewel" in the operation because it was in "meteorologically uncharted territory". Instead of the air strike by the Japanese depicted in the film, there was a skirmish 25 miles from the camp which helped to scare off the enemy. The story was dramatized by Edmund G. Love and published in Collier's September 6, 1952 issue.

Though most of the actors playing natives were American, some actual Mongolian phrases made their way into the film.

Gary Merrill, Richard Basehart, David Wayne, and William Lundigan were the actors that producers originally had in mind when the film was announced. The film was Robert Wise's first in color.

== Reception ==
In The New York Times, film critic A. H. Weiler wrote:

Ever hear of the First Mongolian Cavalry, United States Navy; or the Sino-American Cooperative Organization or Argos VI in Inner Mongolia? Well, a group of artisans at Twentieth Century Fox have. And they have culled from this curiosa as exotic and amiable an adventure as any to have come out of World War II. Titled "Destination Gobi," the Technicolored newcomer, now at the Globe, intriguingly parlays a willing cast, a fair share of laughs, crisp dialogue and unusual locale and some plausible and improbable derring-do into a light but engaging and engrossing entertainment.
