= Subways Are for Sleeping =

- Original cast recording
- Music: Jule Styne
- Lyrics: Betty Comden; Adolph Green
- Book: Betty Comden; Adolph Green
- Basis: Edmund G. Love's article in Harper's and subsequent book
- Productions: 1961 Broadway

Subways Are for Sleeping is a musical produced by David Merrick with book and lyrics by Betty Comden and Adolph Green and music by Jule Styne. The original Broadway production played in 1961–62.

The musical was inspired by an article about subway homelessness in the March 1956 issue of Harper's magazine and a subsequent 1957 book based on it, both by Edmund G. Love, who slept on subway trains throughout the 1950s and encountered many unique individuals. With the profits from his book, Love then embarked on an extraordinary hobby: over the course of several years, he ate dinner at every restaurant listed in the Manhattan yellow pages directory, visiting them in alphabetical order. A previous adaptation of the Harper's article was aired August 3, 1956 on CBS Radio Workshop.

== Synopsis ==
Angie McKay is a magazine writer assigned to write a story about a group of well-dressed homeless people sleeping in the New York subway system. Their leader is Tom Bailey, a one-man employment agency who finds other drifters odd jobs and sleeping quarters. To help research her story, Angie goes undercover and pretends to be a stranded girl from out-of-town. Trouble ensues when Tom discovers her real identity.

== Broadway production ==
After two previews, the Broadway production, directed and choreographed by Michael Kidd, opened on December 27, 1961 at the St. James Theatre, where it ran for 205 performances. The cast included Orson Bean, Sydney Chaplin, Carol Lawrence, Gordon Connell, Grayson Hall, and Green's wife Phyllis Newman (whose costume, consisting solely of a towel, was probably Freddy Wittop's easiest design in his distinguished career), with newcomers Michael Bennett and Valerie Harper in the chorus.

Subways Are for Sleeping opened to mostly negative reviews. The show already was hampered by a lack of publicity, since the New York City Transit Authority refused to post advertisements on the city's buses and in subway trains and stations for fear they would be perceived as officially sanctioning the right of vagrants to use these facilities as overnight accommodations.

The advertisement

Producer David Merrick and press agent Harvey Sabinson decided to invite individuals with the same names as prominent theatre critics (such as Walter Kerr, Richard Watts Jr. and Howard Taubman) to see the show, and afterwards used their favorable comments in print ads. Thanks to photographs of the seven "critics" accompanying their blurbs (the well-known real Richard Watts was not African American), the ad was discovered to be a deception. It was pulled from most newspapers, but not before running in an early edition of the New York Herald Tribune. However, the clever publicity stunt allowed the musical to continue to run and it eventually turned a small profit.

Newman won the Tony Award for Best Featured Actress in a Musical, and nominations went to Bean for Best Featured Actor and Kidd's choreography.

An original cast recording was released by Columbia Records. A revival production was briefly mounted in 2009.

== Songs ==
Act I

- Subways Are for Sleeping
- Girls Like Me
- Station Rush
- I'm Just Taking My Time
- I Was a Shoo-In
- Subway Directions
- Ride Through the Night
- Who Knows What Might Have Been
- Swing Your Projects
- Strange Duet
- I Said It and I'm Glad
- Be a Santa

Act II

- Subway Incident
- How Can You Describe a Face?
- I Just Can't Wait
- Comes Once in a Lifetime
- What Is This Feeling in the Air?

== Awards and nominations ==
=== Original Broadway production ===
Year	Award	Category	Nominee	Result
1962	Tony Award	Best Featured Actor in a Musical	Orson Bean	Nominated
1962	Tony Award	Best Featured Actress in a Musical	Phyllis Newman	Won
1962	Tony Award	Best Choreography	Michael Kidd	Nominated
