= Flushing, Michigan =

- City
- City of Flushing
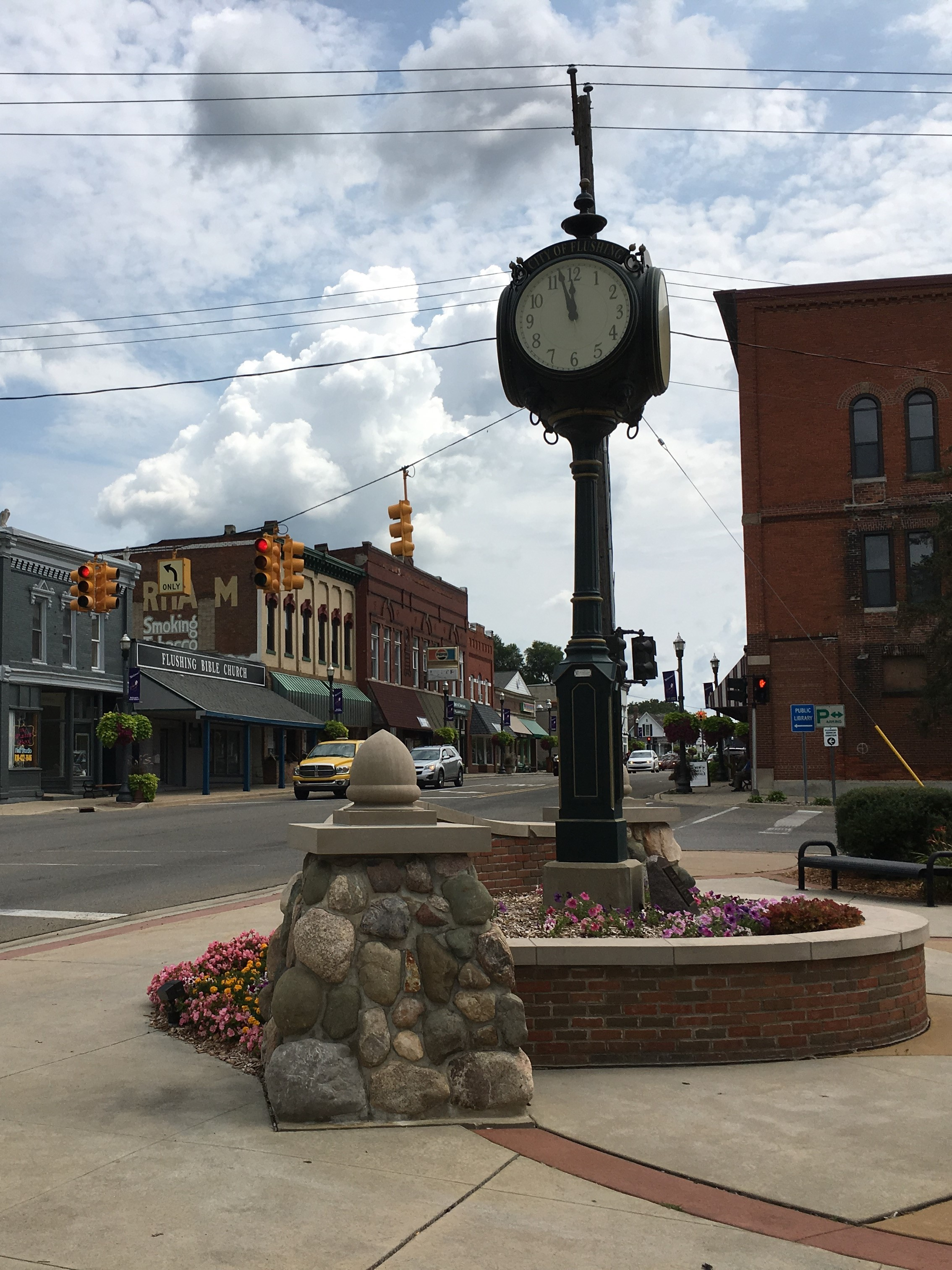
- Downtown Flushing looking east along Main Street from the Flint River

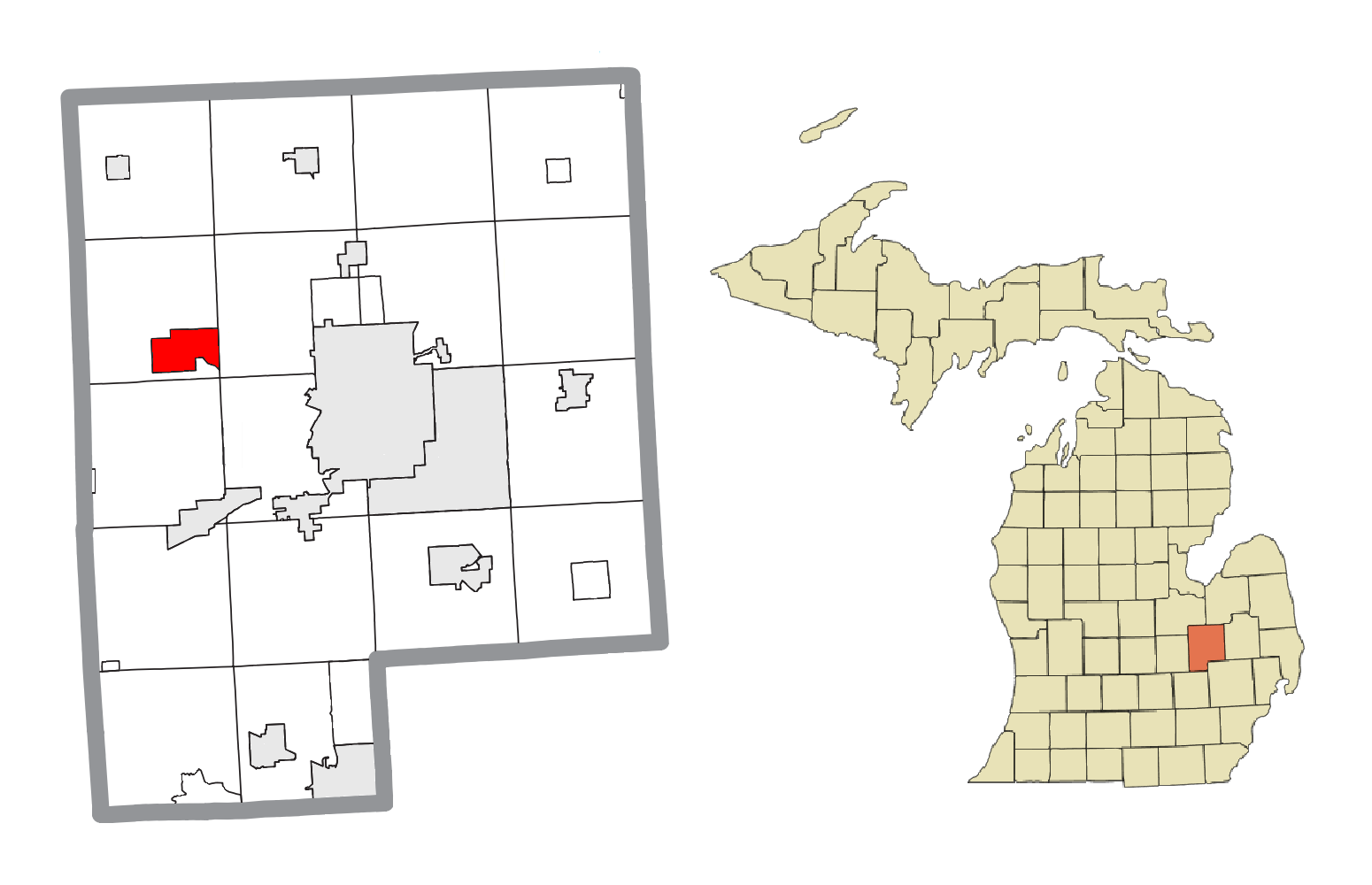
- Location within Genesee County

- Location within the state of Michigan
- Coordinates: 43°03′47″N 83°51′04″W
- Country: United States
- State: Michigan
- County: Genesee
- Platted: 1840
- Incorporated: 1877 (village); 1964 (city)

Government
  - Type: Council–manager
  - Mayor: Ed Sullivan
  - City manager: Michelle King
  - DPW Director: Jeffrey Clark

Area
  - Total: 3.73 sq mi (9.67 km^{2})
  - Land: 3.61 sq mi (9.35 km^{2})
  - Water: 0.12 sq mi (0.31 km^{2}) 4.49%
- Elevation: 699 ft (213 m)

Population (2020)
  - Total: 8,411
  - Density: 2,329.1/sq mi (899.26/km^{2})
- Time zone: UTC-5 (EST)
  - Summer (DST): UTC-4 (EDT)
- ZIP code(s): 48433
- Area code: 810
- FIPS code: 26-29200
- GNIS feature ID: 0626199
- Website: www.flushingcity.com

Flushing is a city in Genesee County, Michigan, United States. The population was 8,411 at the 2020 census. Flushing is considered a suburb of Flint. It is situated within the survey area of Flushing Charter Township, but is administratively autonomous.

Flushing originated as a mill town in the mid-1830s. Its location along the Flint River, the county's largest river, was a decisive factor in its settlement. Water power potential was a significant determinant for the selection of the settlement areas throughout the nineteenth century. In addition to its water power, the area around Flushing was also well suited to agricultural pursuits.

The name Dover originally was selected for the new village until it was discovered that the name already was in use in Lenawee County. Charles Seymour Sr., former resident of Flushing, Long Island, subsequently named the new community after the village in New York State.

== History ==
=== Indigenous era ===
When European settlers first arrived, the area was primarily occupied by bands of the Chippewa (Ojibwa) and Ottawa nations, with the Chippewa being the more numerous and recognized as the original proprietors of the Saginaw Valley. According to Chippewa tradition, their occupation of the region was relatively recent, as the territory had previously been held by the Sauks and Onottoways, who were eventually expelled by a confederation of Chippewa and Ottawa warriors. The principal Sauk village was located on the west side of the Saginaw River, but their domain extended as far south as the headwaters of the Shiawassee and Genesee Counties. The Chippewa and their allies launched a surprise attack, now known as the Battle of Skull Island, resulting in the near destruction of the Sauk and Onottoway tribes, with only a remnant escaping westward. According to the tradition, a reinforcement of Sauk coming from Detroit was intercepted and defeated near Flushing. On the farm formerly owned by Mr. Bailey, large burial mounds were discovered; now the present day Flushing Valley Golf Club. The mounds in this area, when opened by early settlers, were found to be filled with bones, further supporting the oral history of a large-scale battle. Mounds were observed in 1833 or 1834 and about 20 mounds in total .After the defeat of the Sauk, the Chippewa and Ottawa did not immediately settle in the conquered territory, which was considered haunted by the spirits of the slain. Eventually, the Chippewa established themselves in the Saginaw Valley, and the indigenous inhabitants of the Flushing area became known as the Saginaw tribe of the Chippewa nation.

Archaeological evidence, such as ancient mounds and relics, indicates that the Saginaw Valley, including the Flushing area, was inhabited long before the arrival of white settlers. These mounds, often used for sepulture, contained human bones and artifacts, suggesting the presence of a settled population. Some skeletons found in the county were of unusually large size, though the exact identity of these early inhabitants remains uncertain. The mounds in Genesee County, including those near Flushing, were typically burial sites rather than defensive works.

The Flint River, which flows through Flushing, was known to the Native Americans as "Pewonigowink," meaning "River of the Flint" or "River of the Fire Stone." The river and its surrounding lands were important for travel, hunting, and fishing. The principal Indian trail in the region was the "Saginaw trail," which connected Detroit to the Saginaw River and passed through Genesee County, including the Flushing area. This trail was a major route for indigenous peoples and later for European settlers.

The United States government recognized the possessory rights of the Indian tribes in the land and acquired these rights through treaties. The first relevant treaty was the Treaty of Detroit (1807), which ceded much of southeastern Michigan, including most of Genesee County, to the United States. The Treaty of Saginaw (1819), negotiated by Governor Lewis Cass, further extinguished Indian title to lands in the Saginaw Valley, including the Flushing area. In exchange, the Chippewa and other tribes received annuities and reserved certain tracts for their use. The Pewonigowink reservation, now Montrose, which included land in present-day Genesee and Saginaw Counties, was one such tract. Over time, additional treaties in the 1830s and 1840s led to the further cession of Indian lands and the gradual removal or assimilation of the indigenous population. Some Chippewa remained in the area for years after the formal cession of their lands, but most eventually relocated to reservations or other parts of Michigan and Canada. The history of Native Americans in Flushing is closely tied to broader patterns of settlement, displacement, and treaty-making in Michigan during the 18th and 19th centuries.

Early relations between Native Americans and white settlers in the Flushing area were generally peaceful, though marked by the broader context of displacement and cultural change. Indian trails became the basis for many early roads, and indigenous knowledge of the land was often sought by settlers.

=== European settlement ===
In 1835, Charles Seymour Sr. from New York state came to the Flushing area after purchasing land there. He formed a partnership with Horace Jerome in 1836 who had purchased water rights in the vicinity. In their partnership, Seymour would provide pine timber while Jerome would build a mill. The saw mill was operational in the summer of 1837. Jerome left Flushing after his wildcat bank, the Flint Rapids Bank, failed in 1838. A village plat on sections 26 and 27, bearing the name of Flushing and named after the township in which it was located, was laid out December 3, 1840 by Charles Seymour Sr. In 1843 Charles sold out to his brother James Seymour. James then made an additional plat, 31, in 1847.

in 1850, a flat-bottomed boat established early transportation between Flint and Flushing.

=== 19th century ===
On January 10, 1868, a Masonic Lodge, Flushing Lodge No. 223 F. & A. M., was chartered by the Grand Lodge of Free and Accepted Masons of the State of Michigan.

In 1874, a subscription private fire department, the Wolverine Fire Company, was formed with 35 members and Arza N. Niles as first chief engineer. Wolverine paid for a small engine designed by Captain Haas of Flint of his own design and patent.

Flushing was incorporated as a village on March 21, 1877, with its first election held on May 8, 1877. Oscar F. Clarke was elected as the first village president. After incorporation, the fire company turned over its equipment to the village. In 1878, the Haas engine was instrument in containing a major fire in the business district to just a saloon and hotel.

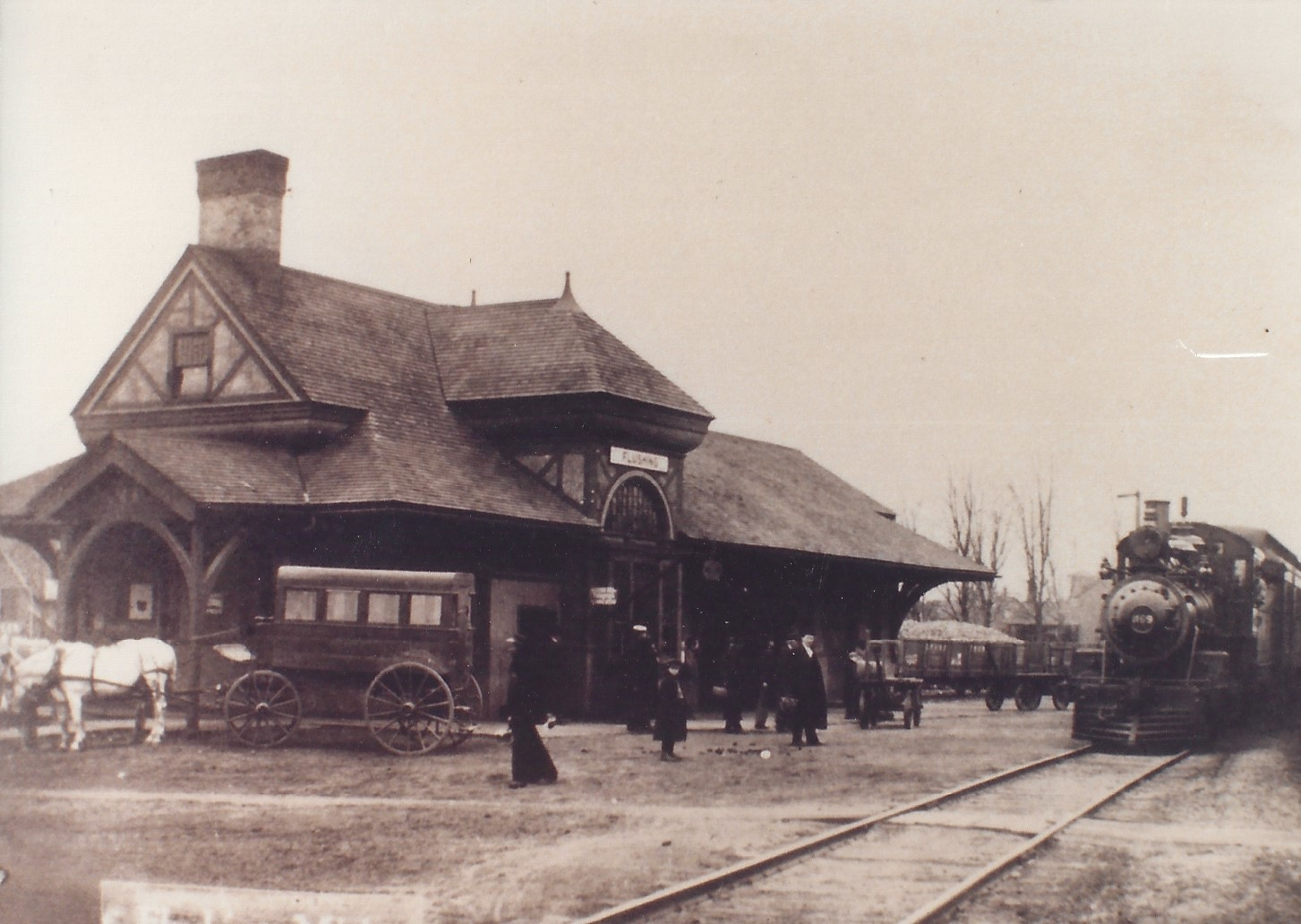
Flushing Depot

The railroad was first brought to Flushing in 1888. Headed by John Ashley, the Toledo and Ann Arbor Railroad connected Flushing to Durand and Saginaw. Construction reached Flushing in July 1888. On Monday, Dec. 17, 1888, the first passenger train arrived from Saginaw. The fare from Flushing to Saginaw was 80 cents. A railroad engine crossed the Flint river for the first time to Hart & Clark mill on February 7, 1889. The line is currently owned by Huron and Eastern Railway, while the restored 1888 depot is now the Flushing Area Museum and Cultural Center.

March 25, 1895 vote passes 215 to 30 for $20,000 bond to build a water works system and electric light plant. Water mains are first installed for use on Nov 1, 1895. Electricity was installed and ready for use on Nov 15, 1895, along with streetlights on Main St. By January 1897 there were 1600 incandescent lamps in the village.

=== 20th century ===
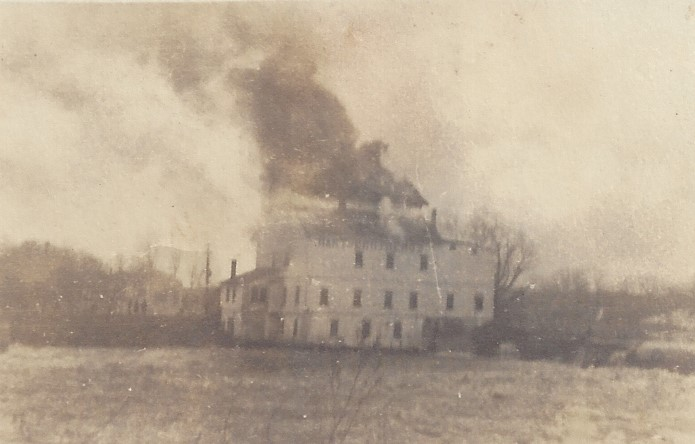
Hart Mill Burning

The Hart Flour Mill is destroyed in a fire on March 19, 1918. It was the 3rd Mill on the site and the 3rd to burn. The mill provided electricity until it burned down in 1918, leaving the village without power for 14 months until a new power plant was built.

Main Street was paved in 1920.

In May 1922 the current bridge on Main Street over the Flint river is completed. The bridge is a traditionally composed earth-filled closed spandrel concrete arch bridge built by L. Smith, H. A. and M. C. Nichols of Hastings, Michigan. The bridge was rehabilitated in 1998 adding new walkways and updated guardrails. The first wood bridge was built on this site in 1839. A second wood bridge in 1856. A third wood bridge in 1872 and a double span iron bridge in 1880. The iron bridge was removed in 1921.

Tucker Memorial Pool was dedicated on July 1, 1956. The pool was built with money donated to the city from the will of Max Dealton Tucker who was born in Flushing.

A book by Edmund G. Love titled The Situation in Flushing was published September 1, 1965. Edmund was born in Flushing and moved to Flint when he was 12. The book tells the account of his boyhood in the early 20th century.

Passengers service to the Flushing Depot ends in 1971.

Completed in 1975 by Michigan Bell Telephone at a cost of $2.2 million, the now AT&T building sits on the site of the former home of James Seymour, brother of Charles Seymour. The home was built in the 1850s and torn down prior to Bell selecting the site.

=== 21st century ===
On Monday November 27, 2017, the northern loop set of municipalities, including Flushing, began receiving water from the Karegnondi Water Authority pipeline which is treated by the Genesee County Drain Commission Water and Waste Division.

On January 15, 2020, District 2 councilwoman Karianne Martus resigned due to her new job at the Flint Farmers Market. With no decision of the council to fill the vacancy, three more councilors resigned at the beginning of the Covid Pandemic citing "discord". John Olson, long-time Planning Commission member, was appointed to serve as city councilman (temporary) in late March 2020 by Genesee County Election Commission. City Manager Brad Barrett was terminated April 20, 2020 at the city council meeting citing ethical concerns and Clarence Goodlein was immediately appointed interim City Manager. A special election was held on August 4, 2020, to fill the vacancies. Councilmen Dan Fralick, Eric Johnson, Dane Miller and councilwoman Danielle Smith were each elected to four year terms.

== Government and politics ==
The city of Flushing is a Council-Manager form of government. The original city charter was adopted Nov 3, 1964 and updated Nov 2, 1993. The Flushing Fire Department is an on call fire fighting service for the city as well as Flushing Township. The command staff consists of a chief, an assistant chief, a battalion chief, two captains and three lieutenants and other firefighters for a total of 20. The City of Flushing Police Department provides police coverage 24 hours a day with Chief, Detective and fourteen (14) patrol officers including a fulltime school resource officer for city elementary schools. The City of Flushing and Flushing township police regularly cooperate to improve services for both communities. The township receives water from the Karegnondi Water Authority pipeline treated by the Genesee County Drain Commission Water and Waste Division.

Flushing is part of the following:

- Genesee County Commissioner District 8
- Michigan's 49th House of Representatives district
- Michigan's 27th Senate district
- 67th District Court Division 1
- Michigan's 5th Congressional District
- Flushing Area Library operated by the Genesee District Library

== Education ==
=== Flushing Community Schools ===
Primary and secondary education are provided by Flushing Community Schools. Since 1954, Flushing is also home to Saint Robert Catholic School for Pre-K through 8th grade.

=== Library ===
==== History ====
The Flushing Ladies' Association was formally organized at the home of Mrs. James A. Button on July 30, 1873. The founding meeting was attended by a group of local women who sought to create a society dedicated to intellectual improvement and the advancement of community welfare. At this initial meeting, Mrs. George Button was elected as the first president, and Mrs. E. G. Bryant as secretary. The association quickly grew, with fifty-two women becoming members at the time of its founding. One of the association's earliest and most significant undertakings was the establishment of a circulating library for the village. The members raised funds through subscriptions, donations, and various fundraising events, such as socials and lectures. The association's library began with an initial fund of $67.60 and a first order of 41 books, costing $63. Over the next several years, the library expanded rapidly, and by 1876, it contained 480 volumes and had a membership of 102. The association also played a role in organizing social events, supporting local charitable causes, and fostering a sense of community among Flushing's women. Its meetings provided an opportunity for members to discuss literature, current events, and topics of mutual interest. The association disbanded in 1905. Library services resumed in 1913 when the Tuesday Club opened a reading room above the People’s State Bank. In 1933, the Flushing Township Board took over, renaming it the Flushing Township Public Library and relocating it to the old Presbyterian Church, now Goggins Hall. Renovations funded by Marian Packard in 1940 modernized the space, and in 1964 the Marian Packard Adult Reading Room was dedicated.

==== Flushing Area Library ====
The library joined the Genesee County Library System in 1966, later known as the Genesee District Library (GDL), expanding its resources. In 1991, it moved into the renovated Duramold building at Maple and Elm Streets, shared with the Flushing Senior Center, and embraced technology in the 2000s with public computers and digital services. The library relocated in October 2025 to the old Wendell W. Phelps DDS Building at address is 220 Boman Street, Flushing, MI 48433.

== Media ==
=== Newspapers ===
The Flushing Patrol was a local newspaper established in the village of Flushing, Michigan, in October 1878 by D. C. Ashmun, who served as its editor and proprietor. Published as a seven-column folio sheet, the Flushing Patrol quickly became the primary source of news and information for the community, covering local events, announcements, and advertisements relevant to Flushing and the surrounding area. At the time of the 1879 county history, the paper boasted a subscription list of 700 to 800 readers, reflecting its importance in the growing village. In addition to the newspaper, a small job-printing office was operated in connection with the publication, offering printing services to local residents and businesses. The Flushing Patrol was the first substantial and regularly published newspaper in Flushing. The Patrol was sold to A.E. Ransom June 15, 1882. and later became The Observer (1882 - 1883) before being renamed The Flushing Observer in 1883 under A.E. Ransom’s ownership. For over a century, the paper served the community by covering local news, civic affairs, and social events. Originally a weekly publication, it transitioned to semiweekly in 1985 and issued special editions marking milestones such as its Centennial Edition in 1935 and Flushing’s 125th Anniversary Picture Edition in 1960. Its content traditionally includes editorials, agricultural market reports, church directories, advertisements, and community announcements until its closure in 2012.

Starting in 2015, the Flushing View serves the area now under the Genesee County View.

== Geography ==
The Flushing area is dominated by the Flint River Valley. The Flint River flows in a northerly direction along the southern and western portions of the city and continues north bisecting Flushing Township. The valley is characterized by rich sandy loam ideal for the growth of vegetation. As a result, the valley is characterized by dense woodlots containing many varieties of trees and providing scenic and natural settings for the area.

According to the United States Census Bureau, the city has a total area of 3.79 square miles (9.82 km^{2}), of which 3.62 square miles (9.38 km^{2}) is land and 0.17 square miles (0.44 km^{2}) is water.

=== Neighborhoods ===
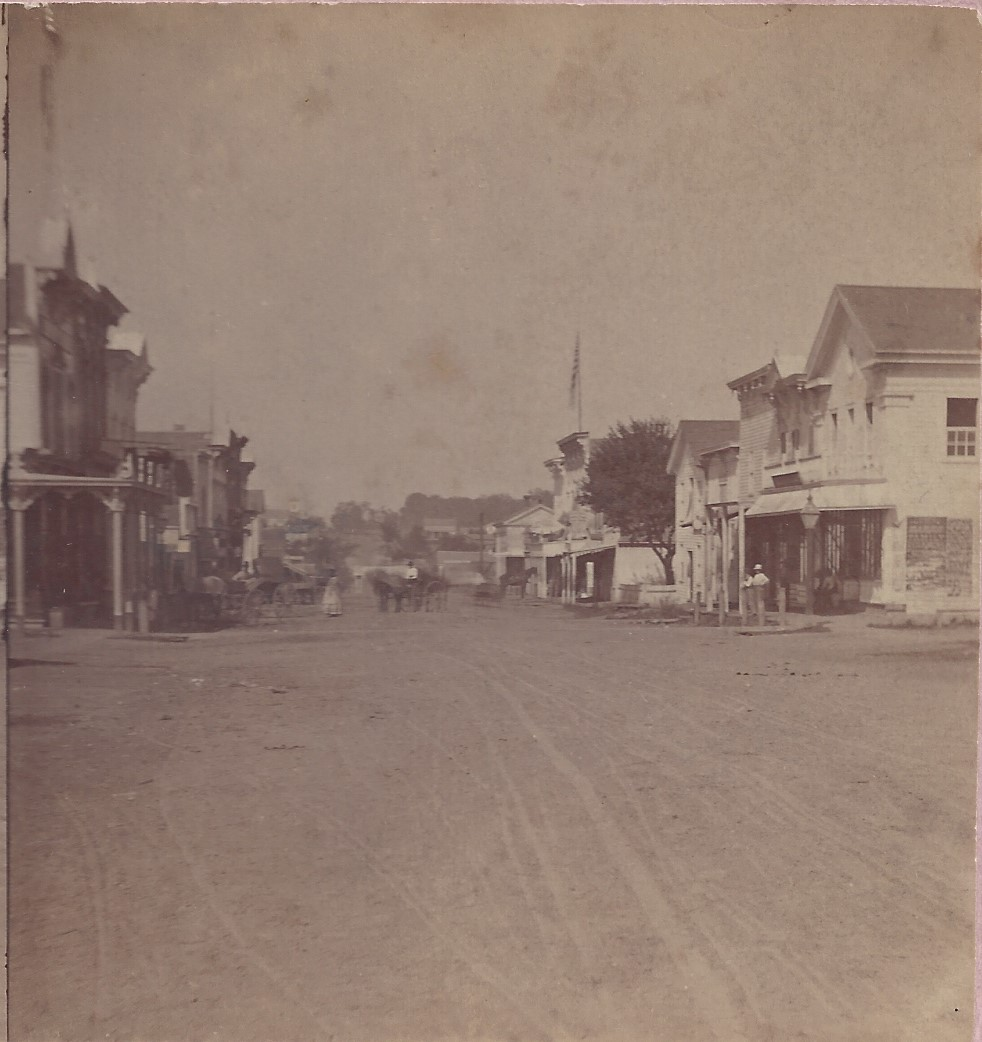
Downtown Flushing looking west. Pre. 1891

The Main Street Historic District includes buildings on Main St from Maple to 628 (East) Main St and the Flushing Depot at 431 W Main St. Properties in this district are listed on the National Register of Historic Places. 82 structures located on 22.4 acres of land create the district with commercial buildings reflecting ornate Italianate and early twentieth century styles constructed between 1850 and 1918 and residences exhibiting a wide variety of Greek Revival, Italianate, Queen Anne, Colonial Revival, and Bungaloid styles and their vernacular derivatives built from 1850 to 1932. Properties we added as part of the Main Street Historic Commercial District and the Genesee County MRA (Multiple Resource Area).

== Environment ==
Flushing's wastewater treatment includes an activated sludge treatment system installed in 1972 and a batch reactor treatment system that was added in 1988. Sewage is split between the two systems. Cleaned water is disinfected with UV light before being discharged into the Flint river. The plant is on 140 Industrial Drive and adjacent to the Riverview Trail. The Waste Water Treatment Plant is undergoing a 5.25 million upgrade which began inn 2022 and is expected to be completed July 2023. Last upgrade was in 1986.

Pollution along the Flint river were once a problem but have vastly improved since the 1950s and 1960s after the Clean Water Act was enacted. The river is a now popular place for fishing, canoeing and kayaking.

The City of Flushing is supplied by surface water pumped from Lake Huron by the Karegnondi Water Authority and delivered by the Genesee County water supply system. The water source was previously Great Lakes Water Authority (GLWA) until November 2017 when Genesee County switched sources.

Electricity and natural gas are provided by Consumers Energy.

== Parks and recreation ==
- Flushing Riverview Trail is a city trail along the Flint River that connects to Flushing County Park

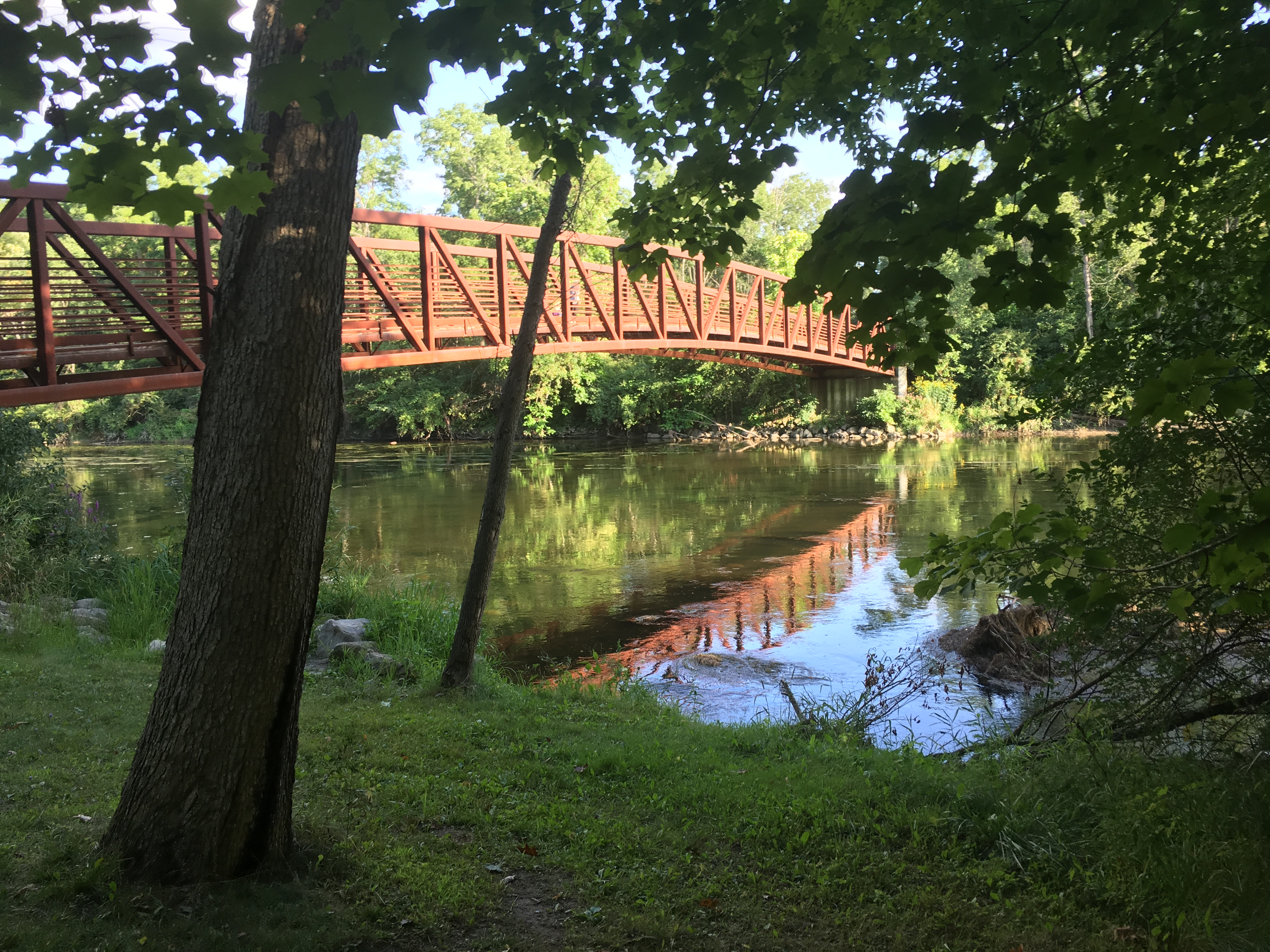
Bridge over Flint River from Flushing Trail

=== City parks ===
- Riverview Park is a 7.4 acre city park located along the Flint river between the Main Street bridge and the DPW.
- Mutton (Bonnie View) Park is a 3.5 acre city park located on the corner of Coutant St and Chestnut St
- Waterworks Park is a 4-acre city park off of Sunnyside Dr.
- Eastview Veterans' Memorial Park is a 14.4 acres park located off of Coutant St near Elms Rd.
- River Road Park is a 4.6 acre city park located off of River Rd near Morrish Rd.
- Cornwell Park is a city park .2 acre park located downtown on the south west corner of Main St and Cherry St. Cornwell park was established in 1961 after the relocation of Genesee Merchants Bank to Cherry St. The existing building was removed and the land donated to the village. A local business man Edgar L. Cornwell (October 17, 1866 - May 15, 1961) in his last civic gesture, established a trust fund to finance the conversion of the site into a park.

== Events ==
- Cruise Nights - Third Saturday of the Month April through September at the Flushing A near Riverview Park.
- Summer Festival - June. Starts with a parade and lasts five days with a carnival in Riverview Park, music, food and other activities.
- Art in the Park - June. Art vendors at Riverview Park.
- Concerts in the Park - Wednesday evenings June through August at Riverview Park.
- Movies in the Park - Saturday Evenings June through August at Riverview Park.
- Harvest Festival - September. downtown Flushing.
- Trail of Terror - October, Riverview Trail.
- Candle Walk - December. Downtown Flushing.

== Demographics ==
Historical population
Census	Pop.	Note	%±
1860	406		—
1870	687		69.2%
1880	690		0.4%
1890	965		39.9%
1900	900		−6.7%
1910	938		4.2%
1920	1,169		24.6%
1930	1,723		47.4%
1940	1,806		4.8%
1950	2,226		23.3%
1960	3,761		69.0%
1970	7,190		91.2%
1980	8,624		19.9%
1990	8,542		−1.0%
2000	8,348		−2.3%
2010	8,389		0.5%
2020	8,411		0.3%
U.S. Decennial Census

=== 2020 census ===
As of the 2020 census, Flushing had a population of 8,411. The population density was 2,329.3 inhabitants per square mile (899.3/km^{2}). The median age was 45.0 years, 21.0% of residents were under the age of 18, and 24.6% were 65 years of age or older. For every 100 females, there were 90.2 males, and for every 100 females age 18 and over there were 83.4 males age 18 and over.

99.9% of residents lived in urban areas, while 0.1% lived in rural areas.

There were 3,628 households, of which 26.6% had children under the age of 18 living in them. Of all households, 43.7% were married-couple households, 15.7% were households with a male householder and no spouse or partner present, and 34.1% were households with a female householder and no spouse or partner present. About 34.7% of all households were made up of individuals and 19.5% had someone living alone who was 65 years of age or older. There were 2.31 persons per household.

There were 3,770 housing units, of which 3.8% were vacant. The homeowner vacancy rate was 1.1% and the rental vacancy rate was 5.9%.

Racial composition as of the 2020 census
Race	Number	Percent
White	7,482	89.0%
Black or African American	310	3.7%
American Indian and Alaska Native	34	0.4%
Asian	85	1.0%
Native Hawaiian and Other Pacific Islander	0	0.0%
Some other race	56	0.7%
Two or more races	444	5.3%
Hispanic or Latino (of any race)	323	3.8%

=== 2010 census ===
As of the census of 2010, there were 8,389 people, 3,574 households, and 2,307 families residing in the city. The population density was 2,317.4 inhabitants per square mile (894.8/km^{2}). There were 3,816 housing units at an average density of 1,054.1 per square mile (407.0/km^{2}). The racial makeup of the city was 94.8% White, 2.4% African American, 0.4% Native American, 0.4% Asian, 0.3% from other races, and 1.6% from two or more races. Hispanic or Latino of any race were 2.2% of the population.

There were 3,574 households, of which 28.0% had children under the age of 18 living with them, 48.3% were married couples living together, 12.4% had a female householder with no husband present, 3.9% had a male householder with no wife present, and 35.5% were non-families. 32.7% of all households were made up of individuals, and 17.1% had someone living alone who was 65 years of age or older. The average household size was 2.30 and the average family size was 2.90.

The median age in the city was 45.1 years. 21.7% of residents were under the age of 18; 7.4% were between the ages of 18 and 24; 20.8% were from 25 to 44; 28.4% were from 45 to 64; and 21.7% were 65 years of age or older. The gender makeup of the city was 46.1% male and 53.9% female.

=== 2000 census ===
As of the census of 2000, there were 8,348 people, 3,435 households, and 2,366 families residing in the city. The population density was 1,936.7 inhabitants per square mile (747.8/km^{2}). There were 3,558 housing units at an average density of 825.4 per square mile (318.7/km^{2}). The racial makeup of the city was 96.98% White, 0.63% African American, 0.32% Native American, 0.40% Asian, 0.04% Pacific Islander, 0.37% from other races, and 1.26% from two or more races. Hispanic or Latino of any race were 1.61% of the population.

There were 3,435 households, out of which 29.7% had children under the age of 18 living with them, 55.8% were married couples living together, 10.2% had a female householder with no husband present, and 31.1% were non-families. 28.4% of all households were made up of individuals, and 14.3% had someone living alone who was 65 years of age or older. The average household size was 2.38 and the average family size was 2.92.

In the city, the population was spread out, with 23.0% under the age of 18, 6.5% from 18 to 24, 24.5% from 25 to 44, 26.3% from 45 to 64, and 19.7% who were 65 years of age or older. The median age was 43 years. For every 100 females, there were 84.8 males. For every 100 females age 18 and over, there were 80.7 males.

The median income for a household in the city was $54,010, and the median income for a family was $64,726. Males had a median income of $52,794 versus $31,502 for females. The per capita income for the city was $24,697. About 4.4% of families and 4.7% of the population were below the poverty line, including 6.3% of those under age 18 and 6.9% of those age 65 or over.

== Notable people ==
- Cornelia Moore Chillson Moots (1843–1929), missionary, temperance evangelist
- Shawn Cronin (1963) is a retired American professional ice hockey defenseman who played in the National Hockey League (NHL) for the Washington Capitals, Winnipeg Jets, Philadelphia Flyers and San Jose Sharks.
- Ralph M. Freeman (1902–1990) was a United States district judge of the United States District Court for the Eastern District of Michigan.
- John J. Gleason (1954) is a Democratic politician and the former Clerk/Register of Deeds for Genesee County, Michigan.
- Halley H. Prosser (1870–1921), member of the Michigan House of Representatives
- Matthew Rettenmund (1968), author (Boy Culture)
- Ira Terry Sayre (1858–1926), Michigan state senator
- Amanda Somerville (1979), singer-songwriter, vocal coach
- Edmund G. Love, (1912–1990), author (Subways Are for Sleeping)
- Tom Smallwood, (1977), professional ten-pin bowler
