= Porter Hazelton =

American politician

Supervisor
- In office 1852–1854
- Preceded by: William Patterson
- Succeeded by: William Patterson
- Constituency: Flint Township, Michigan

Personal details
- Born: November 15, 1812 New York
- Died: August 15, 1870 (aged 57) Flint, Michigan
- Relations: George and Edgar, Brothers

Porter Hazelton (November 15, 1812 – August 15, 1870) was a Michigan politician.

== Early life ==
With his two brothers, George and Edgar, and Ezekial Ewing constructed a bridge across the Flint River for the State of Michigan. With no money to pay them, they received most of the now Hazelton Township in Shiwassee County to the partners which they proceeded to sell to settlers and the Township and an unincorporated village was named after them.

== Political life ==
Hazelton served as Flint Township, Michigan Supervisor in 1852 to 1854. A source indicates that he was elected as the fifth mayor of the Village of Flint in 1859 serving a one-year term. while two other shows William M. Fenton serving another term.

Political offices
Preceded by William Patterson	Supervisor of Flint Township; 1852-1854	Succeeded by William Patterson
