= Joseph S. Fenton =

American politician (1781–1851)

Member of the Michigan House of Representatives from the Genesee County district
- In office February 5, 1851 – November 14, 1851

Personal details
- Born: January 21, 1781 Washington, Massachusetts
- Died: November 14, 1851 (aged 70) Flint, Michigan
- Party: Whig
- Children: William M. Fenton

Joseph S. Fenton (January 21, 1781 – November 14, 1851) was a Michigan politician.

== Early life ==
Fenton was born in Washington, Massachusetts, on January 21, 1781. Fenton lived in Norwich, New York for twenty one years, then he moved to Palmyra, New York. In 1840, he moved to Fenton, Michigan, a town named after his son, Michigan Lieutenant Governor William M. Fenton.

== Career ==
Fenton was a banker. On November 5, 1850, Fenton was elected to the Michigan House of Representatives, where he represented the Genesee County district from February 5, 1851, to until his death. Fenton was a Whig.

== Death ==
Fenton died in office on November 14, 1851, in Flint, Michigan.
