= William Paterson (Michigan politician) =

Mayor of Flint, Michigan

7th Mayor of the City of Flint
- In office 1862–1863
- Preceded by: Ephraim S. Williams
- Succeeded by: William Hamilton

Supervisor
- In office 1854–1855
- Preceded by: Porter Hazelton
- Succeeded by: John L. Gage
- Constituency: Township of Flint

Supervisor
- In office 1851–1852
- Preceded by: A.P. Davis
- Succeeded by: Porter Hazelton
- Constituency: Township of Flint

Supervisor
- In office 1845–1847
- Preceded by: John L. Gage
- Succeeded by: William M. Fenton
- Constituency: Township of Flint

Supervisor
- In office 1868–1868
- Preceded by: Paul H. Stewart
- Succeeded by: Paul H. Stewart
- Constituency: City of Flint, 3rd Ward

Personal details
- Born: c. 1811

William Paterson was a Michigan politician and the seventh mayor of the City of Flint, Michigan serving from 1862 to 1863.

== Political life ==
Patterson was born about 1811. He came to Flint in Michigan Territory fairly early on, but that place was not founded until 1819 so it is now where he was born.

In 1845, he was elected Supervisor of Flint Township and served until 1847. He served in that same office from 1851 to 1852 and again from 1854 to 1855. He was elected as the seventh mayor of the City of Flint in 1863, serving a one-year term. In 1868, he was Flint's 3rd Ward Supervisor for the County Board of Supervisors.

With George Hazelton, the brother of the former mayor Porter Hazelton, Paterson opened the first bank in Flint with capital from one of the other Hazelton brothers. Paterson and the capital disappeared never to be seen again.

Political offices
Preceded by Ephraim S. Williams	Mayor of Flint; 1862-63	Succeeded by William Hamilton
Preceded by John L. Gage	Supervisor, of Flint Township; 1845-1847	Succeeded by William M. Fenton
Preceded by A.P. Davis	Supervisor, of Flint Township; 1851-1852	Succeeded by Porter Hazelton
Preceded by Porter Hazelton	Supervisor, of Flint Township; 1854-1855	Succeeded by John L. Gage
