= Letta =

Letta is an Italian surname and an African given name. It may refer to:

- Gianni Letta (born 1935), an Italian politician and member of Forza Italia
- Enrico Letta (born 1966), Prime Minister of Italy
- Lencho Letta, Ethiopian politician, activist and founding member of Oromo Liberation Front
- Letta Mbulu, a South African jazz singer

== See also ==
- Lettiani, the Democratic Party faction around Enrico Letta
- Henrietta (Letta) Crapo Smith (1862-1921), American painter, granddaughter of the former Michigan Governor, Henry H. Crapo
