= Tillie Berger =

American museum technician

- Born: 1907; Washington, D.C.
- Died: February 12, 1994 (aged 86–87); Silver Spring
- Occupation: Scientific collector
- Employer: United States National Museum (1935–1963); National Museum of Natural History (1963–1977)
- Position held: preparator, supervisor

Tillie E. Hollis Berger (née Hollis; 1907 – 12 February 1994) was an American museum technician. She was the supervisor of the herbarium preparatory staff at the Smithsonian Institution where she pioneered and taught new techniques for mounting plants.

== Early life and education ==
Tillie E. Hollis was born in 1907 in Washington, D.C.. She grew up near the Smithsonian Institution on Linworth Place SW in Washington, D.C.. Her father owned a restaurant near 10th and Pennsylvania Avenue. Tillie and three of her sisters worked at the herbarium at the Smithsonian Institution.

She was married to John H. Berger, and together they had three children.

== Career ==
Tillie Berger worked at the Smithsonian Institution herbarium for 42 years, from 1935 to 1977. After joining, she soon became supervisor of the herbarium preparatory staff which added at least 35,000 newly mounted plants to the collection each year. She developed techniques for mounting plants of varying sizes and shapes to heavy rag paper and taught those techniques to thousands of visiting botanists and herbarium workers. This work required significant creativity and artistry.

Examples of work that she collected and prepared are in the collection at the Smithsonian Institution and include Malus spectabilis, Hibiscus coccineus, Polygonum cespitosum Blume, and Physostegia virginiana (L.) Benth.

== Death and legacy ==
Berger died on February 12, 1994, at the age of 86, in Silver Spring, Maryland.
