= Henry H. Crapo =

American politician (1804–1869)

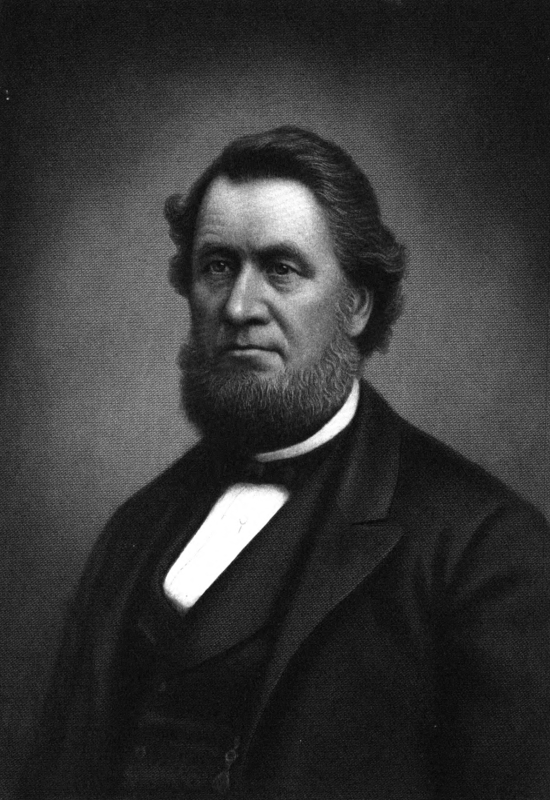

14th Governor of Michigan
- In office January 3, 1865 – January 6, 1869
- Lieutenant: Ebenezer Grosvenor 1865-67; Dwight May 1867-69
- Preceded by: Austin Blair
- Succeeded by: Henry P. Baldwin

5th Mayor of the City of Flint
- In office 1860–1861
- Preceded by: William M. Fenton
- Succeeded by: Ephraim S. Williams

Member of the Michigan Senate from the 24th district
- In office 1863-1864

Personal details
- Born: Henry Howland Crapo; May 24, 1804 Dartmouth, Massachusetts
- Died: July 23, 1869 (aged 65) Flint, Michigan
- Party: Republican
- Spouse: Mary A. Slocum Crapo (m. 1825)
- Relations: William Crapo Durant, grandson
- Children: Rebecca, Rhoda Crapo William W. Crapo
- Occupation: Lumber, railroad
- Profession: Businessman
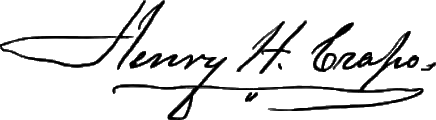
- Signature

Henry Howland Crapo (pronounced Cray-poe; May 24, 1804 – July 23, 1869) was a businessman and politician who was the 14th governor of Michigan from 1865 to 1869, during the end of the American Civil War and the beginning of Reconstruction.

== Early life in Massachusetts ==
Henry Howland Crapo was born to Jesse and Phoebe (Howland) Crapo in Dartmouth, Massachusetts on May 24, 1804. Jesse was of Huguenot descent and a farmer. Crapo took every opportunity to learn especially new words. He taught himself how to be a land surveyor from a book. After working as a surveyor, he became a teacher at the village school at Dartmouth. With a new high school, Henry passed the test to be principal of the new school.

He moved to New Bedford in 1832 at the age of 28 years. There, he returned to being a land surveyor, sometimes an auctioneer and entered the whaling business. He soon was involved in the town's government, being elected to various positions, Town Clerk, Treasurer, and Collector of taxes. He continued as Collector for 15 years until New Bedford became a city, then served the city as Treasurer and Collector of taxes for two or three years.

Crapo was a Justice of the Peace in New Bedford for many years. In 1841 he ruled in favor of the train conductor whom David Ruggles, who was Black, had sued for assault and battery after being violently thrown off a train for sitting in the first-class, "whites only" car. Crapo stated that train conductors had the right to do so, "the right being implied in the very nature of things and supported by common sense." Later that year he delivered a similar decision against the Black abolitionist minister Thomas James, ruling "that custom was law, and that by custom colored people were not allowed to ride in cars in company of white people." James appealed the case and the Massachusetts Supreme Court reversed Crapo's decision, declaring, according to James, "that the word "color," as applied to persons, was unknown to the laws of the commonwealth of Massachusetts, and that the youngest colored child had the same rights as the richest white citizen."

Crapo was elected Alderman of New Bedford, and became Chairman of Council Committee on Education. In the latter role he prepared a report upon which was based the order for the establishment of the free Public Library of New Bedford. On its organization, Mr. Crapo was chosen as a member of the board of trustees. This was the first free public library in Massachusetts, if not in the world. The Boston Free Library was established, however, soon afterwards. While a resident in New Bedford, he was much interested in horticulture, and to obtain the land necessary for carrying out his ideas he drained and reclaimed several acres of rocky and swampy land adjoining his garden. Here he started a nursery, which he filled with almost every description of fruit and ornamental trees, shrubs, flowers, etc. In this he was very successful and took great pride. He was a regular contributor to the New England Horticultural Journal, a position he filled as long as he lived in Massachusetts. As an indication of the wide reputation he acquired in that field of labor, it may be mentioned that after his death an affecting eulogy to his memory was pronounced by the President of the National Horticultural Society at its meeting in Philadelphia, in 1869. A fine barque built at Dartmouth, of which he was part owner, was named the "H. H. Crapo" in compliment to him.

== Life and politics in Michigan ==
In 1858 Crapo moved to Flint, Michigan, primarily due to investments in pinelands, and became Flint's mayor in 1860. His family established a lucrative lumbering business in the area, which by the beginning of the Civil War was one of the largest individually owned lumber firms in the state. He served as mayor until 1861. He was instrumental in the construction of the Flint and Holly Railroad, and was President of that corporation until its consolidation with the Flint and Pere Marquette Railroad. The line is now the CSX Saginaw Subdivision and leased by Lake State Railway.

In 1862, he was elected to the Michigan Senate to represent 24th District from 1863 to 1864.

In 1864, he was nominated on the Republican ticket for Governor of Michigan and won the election. He was re-elected in 1866, holding the office for two terms and retiring in January 1869.

== Retirement and death ==
While serving his last term he was attacked with a disease. A successful surgical operation was performed which seemed rapidly to restore him, but he overestimated his strength, and by too much exertion in business matters and State affairs suffered a relapse from which there was no rebound. Crapo died at the age of 65, nearly seven months after leaving office, at his home in Flint, and is interred there at Glenwood Cemetery.

== Family ==
He married Mary Ann Slocum (1805-1875) on June 9, 1825, in Dartmouth, MA. Their son, William W. Crapo was born on May 16, 1830, in Dartmouth, Bristol County, Massachusetts. He became a lawyer and then served Massachusetts as a representative at the state and federal levels. A daughter married James C. Willson, a doctor and mayor of Flint. His daughter, Rebecca, married William Clark Durant and their only son, William Crapo Durant (Billy Durant), became the leader of Flint's carriage and an automobile industry pioneer who founded General Motors. Crapo's granddaughter, Letta Crapo Smith, daughter of Lucy Crapo, was a well-known painter in the Detroit area.

Children of Henry and Mary:

- Mary Ann Crapo (1827-1903) married Rev John Orrell (1822-1876)
  - Mary Florence Orrell (1858–1943) married Frank Eberly Willett (1848–1924)
    - Mary Kuykendall Willett Blackinton (1886–1965)
    - Gretchen Willett (1888–1905)
  - Esther Morris Orrell (1860–1948) married David D. Mackenzie (1860–1926)
  - John Wallace Orrell (1861-1862)
  - Lucy Crapo Orrell (1863-1931) married Arthur Jerome Eddy (1859-1920)
    - Jerome Orrell Eddy (1891-1951)
  - Elizabeth French Orrell (1865–1867)
  - William Crapo Orrell (1868-1927) married Florence Whaley Bickford (1874–1959)
    - Robert Whaley Orrell (1898–1980) married 1st Martha May Gamble (1901–1977); married 2nd Anne Winifred Mullen (1920–2021)
- William Wallace Crapo (1830-1926) married Sarah Ann Davis Tappan (1831-1893)
  - Henry Howland Crapo II (1862-1951)
  - George Tappan Crapo (1864-1865)
  - Stanford Tappan Crapo (1865-1939) married Emma Caroline Morley (1872-1937)
    - William Wallace Crapo II (1895-1991)
    - Catherine Tappan Crapo (1897-1977) married John Morgan Bullard (1890-1965)
      - John Crapo Bullard (1921-2002) married Katherine G. Kilburn (1922-2005)
        - John Kilburn Bullard (1947-), Mayor of New Bedford, Massachusetts, from 1986 to 1992
      - Jane Bullard (1924-1942)
    - Mary Morley Crapo (1912-2003) married 1st Donald Frizell Hyde (1909-1966); married 2nd David Eccles, 1st Viscount Eccles
      - Anne Howland Hyde (1941-1941)
  - Anna Almy Crapo (1866-1867)
- Rebecca Folger Crapo (1833-1924) married William Clark Durant (1827-1883)
  - Rebecca Crapo Durant (1857-1903)
  - William Crapo Durant (1861-1947) married 1st Clara Miller Pitt (1864-1940), divorced; married 2nd Catherine Lederer (1886-1974)
    - Margery Pitt Durant (1887-1969) married Edwin Rutheven Campbell (1868-1929)
      - William D. Campbell (Scouting) (1907-1995) married Beatrice Hawn (-1987)
        - Margot Campbell
      - Margery Edwina Campbell (1909-2002) married Grant Sanger (1908-1989), son of Margaret Sanger
        - Peter Durant Sanger (1944-1986) married Katharine DuPont (1943-), member of the Du Pont family.
    - Russell Clifford Durant (1890-1937)
- Sarah Bush Crapo (1835-1935)
- Lucy Anna Crapo (1836-1920)
- Rhoda McComber Crapo (1838-1907)
- Henrietta Pell Crapo (1840-1866)
- Lydia Sherman Crapo (1843-1861)
- Emma Eliza Chase Crapo (1845-1897)
- Wilhelmina Helena Crapo (1849-1909) married Charles Warren Clifford (1844-1923), son of Governor of Massachusetts John H. Clifford.

Party political offices
Preceded by Austin Blair	Republican nominee for Governor of Michigan; 1864, 1866	Succeeded by Henry P. Baldwin
Political offices
Preceded by Austin Blair	Governor of Michigan; 1865–1869	Succeeded by Henry P. Baldwin
Preceded by William M. Fenton	Mayor of Flint; 1860-61	Succeeded by Ephraim S. Williams
