= 1864 Michigan gubernatorial election =

- November 8, 1864
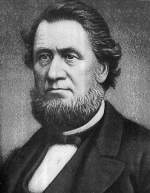

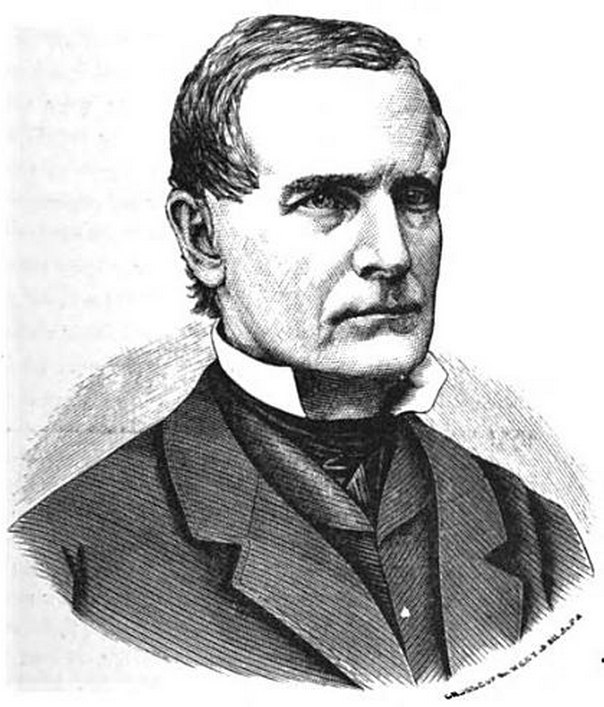
Nominee	Henry H. Crapo	William M. Fenton
Party	National Union	Democratic
Popular vote	91,356	74,293
Percentage	55.14%	44.84%
- County results Crapo: 50–60% 60–70% 70–80% 80–90% Fenton: 50–60% 60–70% 70–80% 80–90% No data/vote
Governor before election
Austin Blair
Republican
Elected Governor
Henry H. Crapo
National Union

The 1864 Michigan gubernatorial election was held on November 8, 1864. National Union nominee Henry H. Crapo defeated Democratic nominee William M. Fenton with 55.14% of the vote.

== General election ==
=== Candidates ===
Major party candidates

- Henry H. Crapo, National Union
- William M. Fenton, Democratic

=== Results ===
1864 Michigan gubernatorial election
Party	Candidate	Votes	%	±%
National Union	Henry H. Crapo	91,356	55.14%	+2.63%
Democratic	William M. Fenton	74,293	44.84%	−2.61%
	Scattering	19	0.01%	
	Imperfect (Note: These are ballots that were intended for the main candidates but contained misspellings. The canvass does not list specific variations, it just groups these votes together.)	3	0.00%	
Majority		17,063	10.30%	
Total votes		165,671	100.00%	
National Union hold		Swing	+5.24%	

==== Results by county ====
No votes were recorded in Alpena County and Marquette County. Ottawa County has voted Democratic in only one gubernatorial election since this one. (Note: In 1890)

County	Henry H. Crapo National Union		William M. Fenton Democratic		Margin		Total votes cast
County	#	%	#	%	#	%	Total votes cast
Allegan	1,865	54.60%	1,551	45.40%	314	9.19%	3,416
Antrim	73	82.95%	15	17.05%	58	65.91%	88
Allegan	1,665	61.99%	1,021	38.01%	644	23.98%	2,686
Bay	460	43.98%	586	56.02%	-126	-12.05%	1,046
Berrien	2,562	52.58%	2,311	47.42%	251	5.15%	4,873
Branch	3,037	67.35%	1,472	32.65%	1,565	34.71%	4,509
Calhoun	3,750	59.69%	2,532	40.31%	1,218	19.39%	6,282
Cass	1,774	55.20%	1,440	44.80%	334	10.39%	3,214
Cheboygan	23	26.44%	64	73.56%	-41	-47.13%	87
Chippewa	46	27.06%	124	72.94%	-78	-45.88%	170
Clinton	1,530	51.93%	1,416	48.07%	114	3.87%	2,946
Delta	20	40.00%	30	60.00%	-10	-20.00%	50
Eaton	1,850	57.29%	1,379	42.71%	471	14.59%	3,229
Emmet	74	30.08%	172	69.92%	-98	-39.84%	246
Genesee	2,716	57.69%	1,992	42.31%	724	15.38%	4,708
Grand Traverse	373	81.80%	83	18.20%	290	63.60%	456
Gratiot	572	61.11%	364	38.89%	208	22.22%	936
Hillsdale	3,807	68.64%	1,739	31.36%	2,068	37.29%	5,546
Houghton	382	28.05%	980	71.95%	-598	-43.91%	1,362
Huron	360	51.58%	338	48.42%	22	3.15%	698
Ingham	1,803	50.17%	1,791	49.83%	12	0.33%	3,594
Ionia	2,209	61.45%	1,386	38.55%	823	22.89%	3,595
Iosco	56	56.00%	43	43.00%	13	13.00%	100 (Note: Includes 1 scattering vote)
Isabella	215	71.19%	87	28.81%	128	42.38%	302
Jackson	3,005	50.80%	2,910	49.20%	95	1.61%	5,915
Kalamazoo	3,155	59.97%	2,106	40.03%	1,049	19.94%	5,261
Kent	3,406	53.37%	2,976	46.63%	430	6.74%	6,382
Keweenaw	295	43.00%	391	57.00%	-96	-13.99%	686
Lapeer	1,471	54.12%	1,247	45.88%	224	8.24%	2,718
Leelanau	232	61.38%	146	38.62%	86	22.75%	378
Lenawee	4,800	56.84%	3,645	43.16%	1,155	13.68%	8,445
Livingston	1,604	44.58%	1,994	55.42%	-390	-10.84%	3,598
Mackinac	30	13.95%	185	86.05%	-155	-72.09%	215
Macomb	2,050	48.45%	2,181	51.55%	-131	-3.10%	4,231
Manistee	144	66.67%	72	33.33%	72	33.33%	216
Manitou	11	8.27%	122	91.73%	-111	-83.46%	133
Mason	134	64.42%	74	35.58%	60	28.85%	208
Mecosta	146	60.08%	97	39.92%	49	20.16%	243
Menominee	51	68.00%	24	32.00%	27	36.00%	75
Midland	210	67.96%	99	32.04%	111	35.92%	309
Monroe	1,657	41.45%	2,341	58.55%	-684	-17.11%	3,998
Montcalm	596	57.31%	443	42.60%	153	14.71%	1,040
Muskegon	654	63.56%	375	36.44%	279	27.11%	1,029
Newaygo	404	61.96%	248	38.04%	156	23.93%	652
Oakland	3,723	49.28%	3,832	50.72%	-109	-1.44%	7,555
Oceana	354	66.42%	179	33.58%	175	32.83%	533
Ontonagon	251	36.12%	444	63.88%	-193	-27.77%	695
Ottawa	1,355	46.77%	1,542	53.23%	-187	-6.45%	2,897
Saginaw	1,722	47.40%	1,911	52.60%	-189	-5.20%	3,633
Sanilac	753	70.24%	319	29.76%	434	40.49%	1,072
Shiawassee	1,422	52.49%	1,287	47.51%	135	4.98%	2,709
St. Clair	1,816	46.80%	2,064	53.20%	-248	-6.39%	3,880
St. Joseph	2,689	59.78%	1,809	40.22%	880	19.56%	4,498
Tuscola	796	67.06%	391	32.94%	405	34.12%	1,187
Van Buren	1,995	58.76%	1,400	41.24%	595	17.53%	3,395
Washtenaw	3,643	48.66%	3,844	51.34%	-201	-2.68%	7,487
Wayne	5,948	43.57%	7,687	56.31%	-1,739	-12.74%	13,651 (Note: Includes 16 scattering votes)
Soldiers	9,612	76.24%	2,992	23.73%	6,620	52.51%	12,608 (Note: Includes 1 scattering vote and 3 imperfect votes)
Total	91,356	55.14%	74,293	44.84%	17,063	10.30%	165,671

===== Counties that flipped from Democratic to National Union =====
- Berrien
- Cass
- Ingham
- Iosco
- Jackson

===== Counties that flipped from Republican to Democratic =====
- Keweenaw
