= Ephraim S. Williams =

American politician

Ephraim Smith Williams
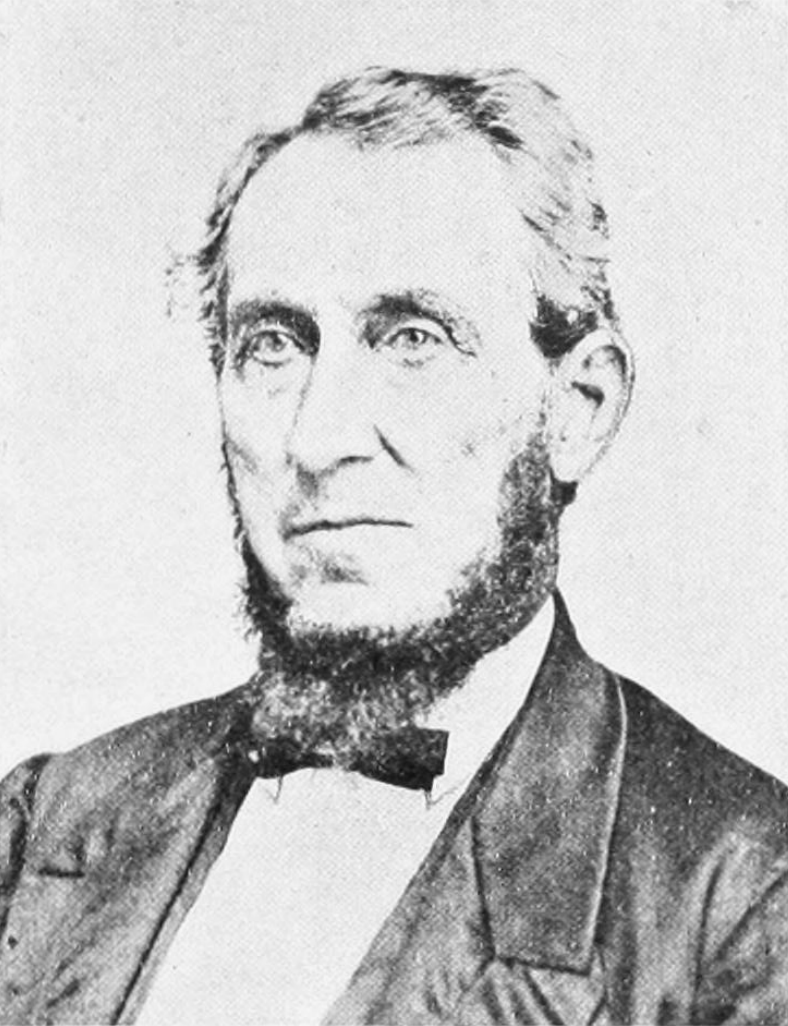

7th Mayor of the City of Flint
- In office 1861–1862
- Preceded by: Henry H. Crapo
- Succeeded by: William Paterson

Personal details
- Born: February 7, 1802 Concord, Massachusetts
- Died: July 20, 1890 (aged 88) Flint, Michigan

Ephraim Smith Williams (February 7, 1802 – July 20, 1890) was the seventh mayor of the Village (now City) of Flint, Michigan serving from 1861 to 1862.

== Early life ==
In 1861 he was elected Mayor of the city of Flint.

He also operated as a land merchant.

== Political life ==
He was elected as the seventh mayor of the City of Flint in 1861 serving a one-year term.

Political offices
Preceded by Henry H. Crapo	Mayor of Flint; 1861-62	Succeeded by William Paterson
