= Fenton United Methodist Church =

Church

Coordinates: 42.79593°N 83.70425°W

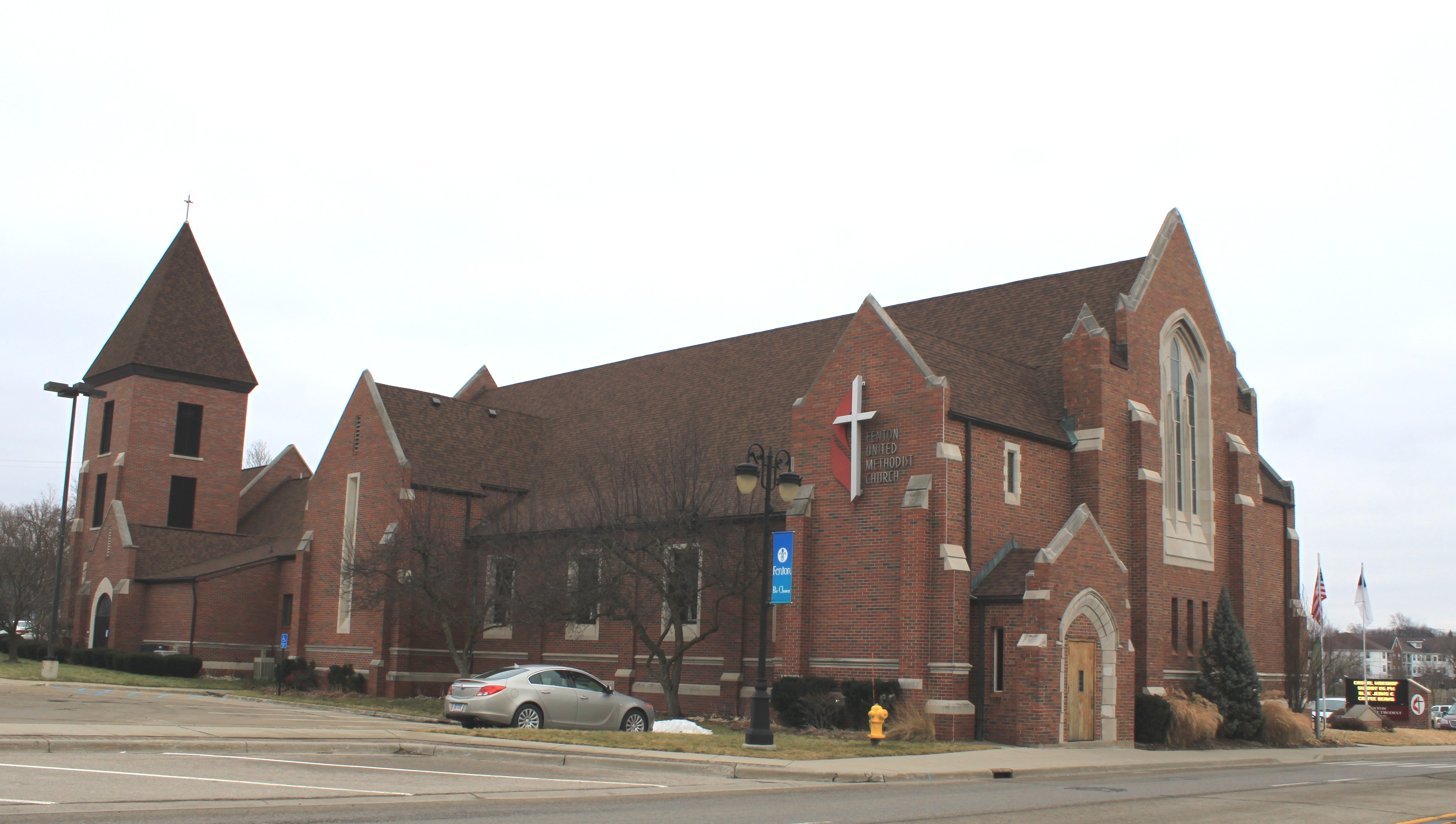
Fenton United Methodist Church

Fenton United Methodist Church is the oldest congregation in Fenton, Michigan. The group's church is located at 119 South Leroy Street.

The hymn tune "Keddy" was composed by Edwin R. Taylor for the text, "O God, Your Hand is Guiding Us" (penned by long-time church member, Beulah Keddy), and was first sung on May 3, 1987, at the church's 150th anniversary.
