= Supervision =

Act or instance of directing, managing, or oversight

Supervision is an act or instance of directing, managing, or oversight.

== Etymology ==
The English noun "supervision" derives from the two Latin words "super" (above) and "videre" (see, observe).

== Spelling ==
The spelling is "Supervision" in Standard English of all English linguistic varieties, including North American English.

== Definitions ==
Supervision is the act or function of overseeing something or somebody. It is the process that involves guiding, instructing and correcting someone.

A person who performs supervision is a "supervisor", but does not always have the formal title of supervisor. A person who is getting supervision is the "supervisee".

== Theoretical scope ==
Generally, supervision contains elements of providing knowledge, helping to organize tasks, enhance motivation, and monitoring activity and results; the amount of each element is varying in different contexts.

== Nature of supervision ==
=== Academia ===
In academia, supervision is the aiding and guiding of a university student in their research project; offering both moral support and scientific insight and guidance. The supervisor is often a senior scientist or scholar, and in some countries called doctoral advisor.

=== Business ===
In business, supervision is overseeing the work of staff. The person performing supervision could lack a formal title or carry the title supervisor or manager, where the latter has wider authority.

=== Counseling ===
In clinical supervision, the psychologist or psychiatrist has talk sessions with another professional in the field to debrief and mentally process the patient work.

=== Society ===
In society, supervision could be performed by the state or corporate entities to monitor and control its citizens. Public entities often do supervision of different activities in the nation, such as bank supervision.

== See also ==
- Clinical supervision
- Management
- Supervisor
