= 1866 Michigan gubernatorial election =

- November 6, 1866
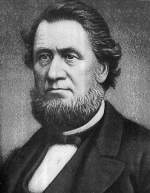

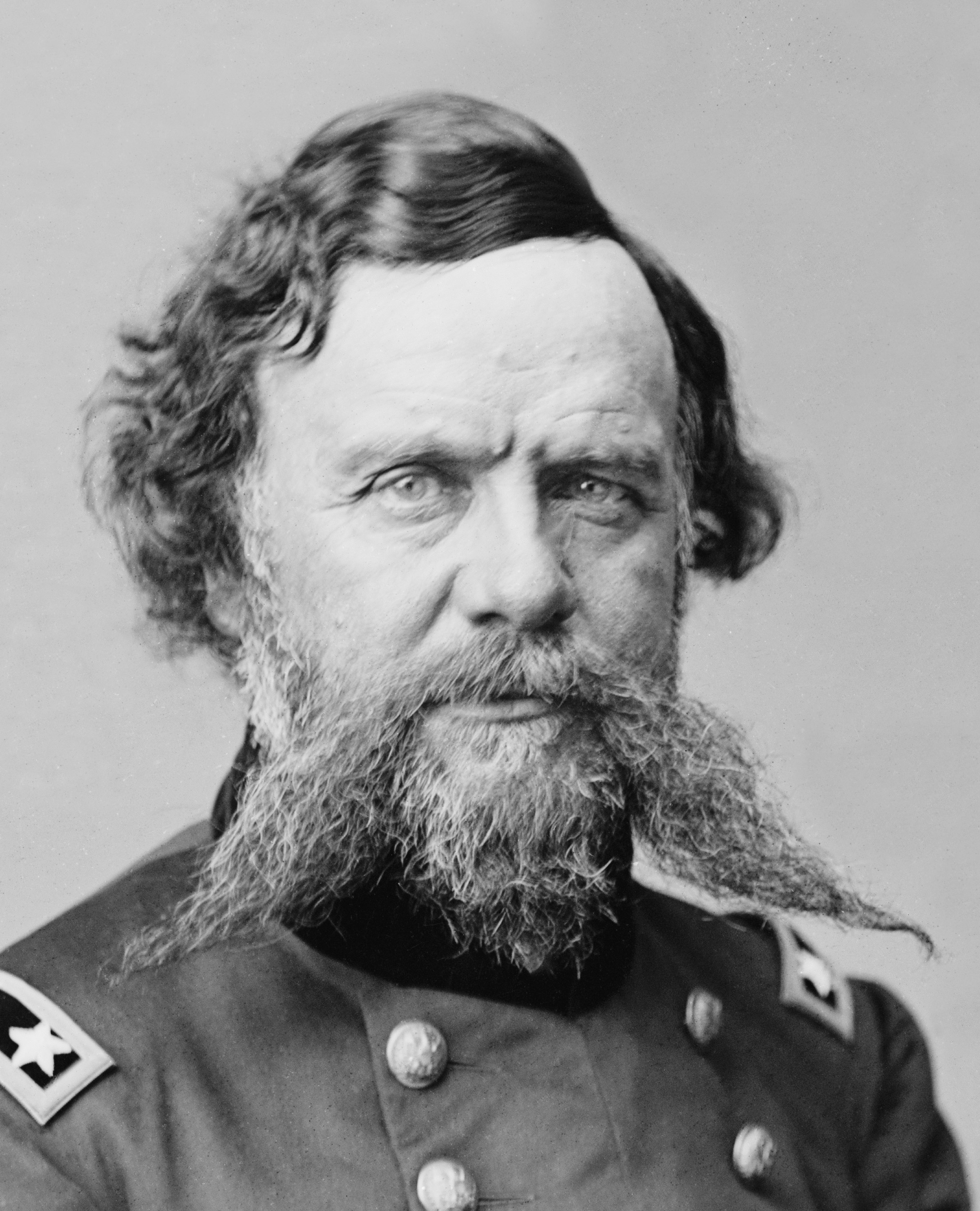
Nominee	Henry H. Crapo	Alpheus S. Williams
Party	Republican	Democratic
Popular vote	96,746	67,708
Percentage	58.81%	41.16%
- County results Crapo: 50–60% 60–70% 70–80% 80–90% 90–100% Williams: 50–60% 60–70% 70–80% No data/vote
Governor before election
Henry H. Crapo
Republican
Elected Governor
Henry H. Crapo
Republican

The 1866 Michigan gubernatorial election was held on November 6, 1866. Incumbent Republican Henry H. Crapo defeated Democratic nominee Alpheus S. Williams with 58.81% of the vote.

== General election ==
=== Candidates ===
Major party candidates

- Henry H. Crapo, Republican
- Alpheus S. Williams, Democratic

=== Results ===
1866 Michigan gubernatorial election
Party	Candidate	Votes	%	±%
Republican	Henry H. Crapo (inc.)	96,746	58.81%	+3.67%
Democratic	Alpheus S. Williams	67,708	41.16%	−3.68%
	Imperfect (Note: These are ballots that were intended for the main candidates but contained misspellings. The canvass does not list specific variations, it just groups these votes together.)	29	0.02%	
	Scattering	12	0.01%	
Majority		29,038	17.65%	
Total votes		164,495	100.00%	
Republican hold		Swing	+7.35%	

==== Results by county ====
No votes were recorded in Emmet County and Manitou County.

County	Henry H. Crapo Republican		Alpheus S. Williams Democratic		Margin		Total votes cast
County	#	%	#	%	#	%	Total votes cast
Allegan	2,496	63.11%	1,459	36.89%	1,037	26.22%	3,955
Alpena	125	49.02%	130	50.98%	-5	-1.96%	255
Antrim	124	87.94%	17	12.06%	107	75.89%	141
Allegan	2,243	67.30%	1,090	32.70%	1,153	34.59%	3,333
Bay	713	49.17%	737	50.83%	-24	-1.66%	1,450
Berrien	3,229	57.89%	2,347	42.08%	882	15.81%	5,578 (Note: Includes 2 scattering votes)
Branch	3,276	73.26%	1,195	26.72%	2,081	46.53%	4,472 (Note: Includes 1 scattering vote)
Calhoun	4,009	64.95%	2,163	35.05%	1,846	29.91%	6,172
Cass	2,034	58.45%	1,445	41.52%	589	16.93%	3,480 (Note: Includes 1 imperfect vote)
Cheboygan	41	33.33%	82	66.67%	-41	-33.33%	123
Chippewa	57	41.01%	82	58.99%	-25	-17.99%	139
Clinton	2,102	58.18%	1,511	41.82%	591	16.36%	3,613
Delta	74	41.34%	105	58.66%	-31	-17.32%	179
Eaton	2,333	61.62%	1,439	38.01%	894	23.61%	3,786 (Note: Includes 14 imperfect votes)
Genesee	3,214	61.87%	1,977	38.06%	1,237	23.81%	5,195 (Note: Includes 4 imperfect votes)
Grand Traverse	481	98.16%	9	1.84%	472	96.33%	490
Gratiot	888	64.82%	482	35.18%	406	29.64%	1,370
Hillsdale	4,364	72.44%	1,658	27.52%	2,706	44.92%	6,024 (Note: Includes 2 imperfect votes)
Houghton (Note: Not included in official canvass)	368	28.20%	937	71.80%	-569	-43.60%	1,305
Huron	505	60.33%	332	39.67%	173	20.67%	837
Ingham	2,538	55.32%	2,050	44.68%	488	10.64%	4,588
Ionia	2,687	67.48%	1,295	32.52%	1,392	34.96%	3,982
Iosco	121	54.02%	103	45.98%	18	8.04%	224
Isabella	336	60.11%	223	39.89%	113	20.21%	559
Jackson	3,410	53.07%	3,012	46.88%	398	6.19%	6,425 (Note: Includes 3 scattering votes)
Kalamazoo	3,145	65.21%	1,678	34.79%	1,467	30.42%	4,823
Kent	4,067	60.12%	2,698	39.88%	1,369	20.24%	6,765
Keweenaw	394	54.72%	326	45.28%	68	9.44%	720
Lapeer	1,831	59.08%	1,268	40.92%	563	18.17%	3,099
Leelanau	243	82.65%	51	17.35%	192	65.31%	294
Lenawee	5,639	61.08%	3,593	38.92%	2,046	22.16%	9,232
Livingston	1,968	49.55%	2,004	50.45%	-36	-0.91%	3,972
Mackinac	39	30.00%	91	70.00%	-52	-40.00%	130
Macomb	2,461	52.97%	2,185	47.03%	276	5.94%	4,646
Manistee	271	98.91%	1	0.36%	270	98.54%	274
Marquette	211	28.71%	524	71.29%	-313	-42.59%	735
Mason	134	95.04%	7	4.96%	127	90.07%	141
Mecosta	274	71.54%	109	28.46%	165	43.08%	383
Menominee	116	84.67%	21	15.33%	95	69.34%	137
Midland	258	67.19%	121	31.51%	137	35.68%	384 (Note: Includes 5 imperfect votes)
Monroe	2,164	50.93%	2,085	49.07%	79	1.86%	4,249
Montcalm	911	64.06%	511	35.94%	400	28.13%	1,422
Muskegon	803	67.54%	386	32.46%	417	35.07%	1,189
Newaygo	545	70.32%	229	29.55%	316	40.77%	775
Oakland	4,257	52.58%	3,839	47.42%	418	5.16%	8,096
Oceana	600	74.72%	203	25.28%	397	49.44%	803
Ontonagon	226	37.17%	380	62.50%	-154	-25.33%	608
Ottawa	1,606	53.48%	1,395	46.45%	211	7.03%	3,003
Saginaw	2,339	57.20%	1,749	42.77%	590	14.43%	4,089
Sanilac	925	75.63%	298	24.37%	627	51.27%	1,223
Shiawassee	1,907	56.79%	1,451	43.21%	456	13.58%	3,358
St. Clair	2,566	54.93%	2,105	45.07%	461	9.87%	4,671
St. Joseph	2,898	62.32%	1,752	37.68%	1,146	24.65%	4,650
Tuscola	1,073	75.14%	355	24.86%	718	50.28%	1,428
Van Buren	2,507	64.78%	1,363	35.22%	1,144	29.56%	3,870
Washtenaw	3,914	51.49%	3,688	48.51%	226	2.97%	7,602
Wayne	5,054	44.51%	6,299	55.48%	-1,245	-10.97%	11,354
Total	96,746	58.81%	67,708	41.16%	29,038	17.65%	164,495

===== Counties that flipped from Democratic to Republican =====
- Keweenaw
- Macomb
- Monroe
- Oakland
- Ottawa
- Saginaw
- St. Clair
- Washtenaw
