= Alpheus S. Williams =

Union Army general and politician

Alpheus Starkey Williams
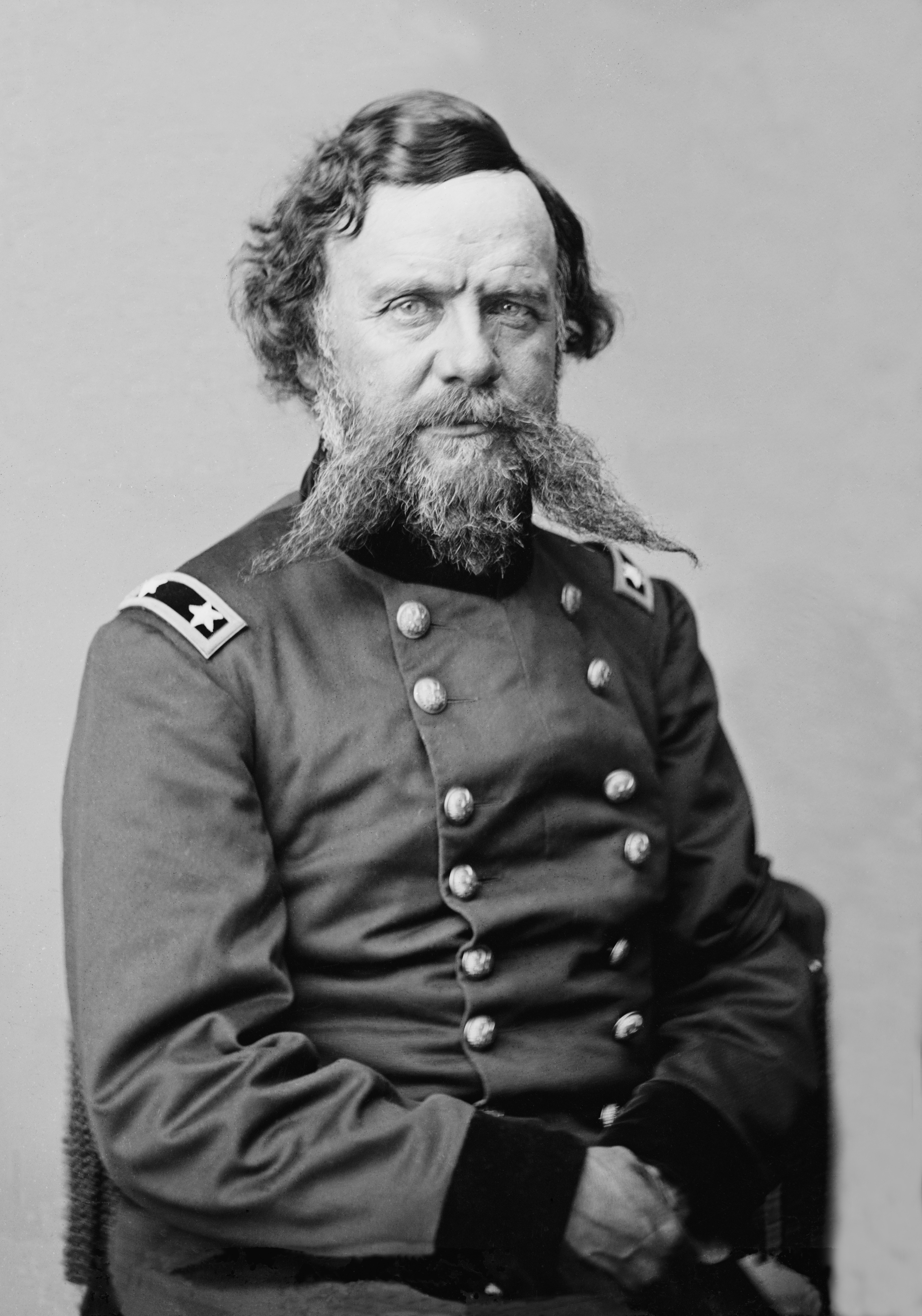
- Alpheus S. Williams

Member of the U.S. House of Representatives from Michigan's 1st district
- In office March 4, 1875 – December 21, 1878
- Preceded by: Moses W. Field
- Succeeded by: John Stoughton Newberry

Personal details
- Born: September 20, 1810 Deep River, Connecticut, U.S.
- Died: December 21, 1878 (aged 68) Washington, D.C., U.S.
- Resting place: Elmwood Cemetery, Detroit, Michigan
- Party: Democratic
- Education: Yale University

Military service
- Allegiance: United States of America; Union
- Branch/service: United States Army; Union Army
- Years of service: 1847–1848, 1861–1866
- Rank: Brevet Major General
- Commands: XII Corps
- Battles/wars: Mexican–American War (Arrived too late to see action.): American Civil War; Shenandoah Valley Campaign; Northern Virginia campaign; Battle of Cedar Mountain; Maryland Campaign; Battle of Antietam; Battle of Chancellorsville; Battle of Gettysburg; Atlanta campaign; Battle of Resaca; Battle of New Hope Church; Sherman's March to the Sea; Campaign of the Carolinas; Battle of Bentonville

Alpheus Starkey Williams (September 20, 1810 – December 21, 1878) was a lawyer, judge, journalist, U.S. congressman, and a Union general in the American Civil War.

== Early life ==
Williams was born in Deep River, Connecticut. He graduated from Yale University with a law degree in 1831. His father, who died when Williams was eight years old, had left him a sizable inheritance, which he used between 1832 and 1836 for extensive travel in the United States and Europe. Upon his return, he settled in Detroit, Michigan, which was a booming frontier town in 1836. He established himself as a lawyer and married the daughter of a prominent family, Jane Hereford Larned, with whom he produced five children, two of whom died as infants. Jane herself died young as well, in 1848, at the age of 30.

Williams had a variety of careers in Detroit. He was elected probate judge of Wayne County, Michigan; in 1842, president of the Bank of St. Clair; in 1843, the owner and editor of the Detroit Advertiser daily newspaper; from 1849 to 1853, postmaster of Detroit.

When Williams arrived in Detroit in 1836, he joined a company in the Michigan Militia and maintained a connection to the military activities of the city for years. In 1847, he was appointed lieutenant colonel of the 1st Michigan Infantry destined for the Mexican–American War, but it arrived too late to see any action. He also served as the president of the state's military board and in 1859 was a major in the Detroit Light Guard.

== Civil War ==
At the outbreak of the Civil War in 1861, Williams was involved in training the first army volunteers in Michigan. He was appointed brigadier general of volunteers on May 17, 1861. His first assignment after leaving the training camps was as a brigade commander in Maj. Gen. Nathaniel Banks's division of the Army of the Potomac, from October 1861 to March 1862. He then assumed division command in the V Corps of the Army of the Potomac, as of March 13, 1862. This division was transferred to the Department of the Shenandoah from April to June of that year. Williams and Banks were sent to fight Maj. Gen. Thomas J. "Stonewall" Jackson in the Shenandoah Valley and were thoroughly outmaneuvered, allowing Jackson to bottle them up in the Valley with his much smaller force.

On June 26, Williams's division was transferred to the Army of Virginia, under Maj. Gen. John Pope, for the Northern Virginia Campaign. In the Battle of Cedar Mountain, Banks's Corps was again up against Jackson, and was again defeated. The corps was at Bristoe Station and did not participate in the Second Battle of Bull Run.

Williams's division rejoined the Army of the Potomac as the 1st Division of the XII Corps and marched north in the Maryland Campaign to the Battle of Antietam. On the way, troops from the division found the famous Confederate "lost dispatch," Special Order 191, that revealed Gen. Robert E. Lee's plan for the campaign and gave Maj. Gen. George B. McClellan key insights on how to defeat Lee's divided army. The division was heavily engaged at Sharpsburg, once again up against Jackson on the Confederate left flank. The corps commander, Maj. Gen. Joseph K. Mansfield, was killed early at Antietam, and Williams assumed temporary command. The corps suffered 25% casualties in assaulting Jackson, and Brig. Gen. George S. Greene's division was forced to withdraw from its advanced position at the Dunker Church. George McClellan assigned Maj. Gen Henry Slocum permanent command of the XII Corps after the battle.

Williams's division missed the next major battle for the Army of the Potomac, the Battle of Fredericksburg, because it was engaged in defending the Potomac River in the Reserve. In the Battle of Chancellorsville, on May 2, 1863, Stonewall Jackson's corps executed a surprise flanking movement and smashed into the right flank of the Army of the Potomac, severely damaging the unsuspecting XI Corps. The neighboring division, under Williams, entrenched hastily and was able to stop the Confederate advance before it overran the entire army, but it suffered 1,500 casualties in the process.

In the Battle of Gettysburg, Williams's division arrived on the battlefield late in the afternoon of July 1, 1863, and occupied Benner's Hill, east of the town of Gettysburg. On July 2, the XII Corps took up positions on Culp's Hill, the right flank of the Union line. At this point, due to a command misunderstanding, Henry Slocum believed that he was in command of the "Right Wing" of the army, consisting of the XI and XII Corps. Therefore, Williams assumed temporary command of the XII Corps and controlled it for the rest of the battle. Brig. Gen. Thomas Ruger took command of Williams' division.

On the afternoon of July 2, a massive attack by Lt. Gen. James Longstreet on the Union's left flank caused army commander Maj. Gen. George G. Meade to order Williams to transfer his entire corps to reinforce the left, in the vicinity of Little Round Top. Williams convinced Meade of the importance of Culp's Hill and managed to retain one brigade, under Greene, in their defensive positions. In an heroic defense, Greene and his brigade withstood the assault of Maj. Gen. Edward "Allegheny" Johnson's Confederate division (the "Stonewall Division") throughout the night, until the remaining brigades of the XII Corps returned. Early on July 3, Williams launched an attack against the Confederates who had occupied some of the entrenchments on the hill and, after a seven-hour battle, regained his original line. Unfortunately for Williams, General Slocum was late in writing his official report of the battle, and Meade submitted his report for the army without acknowledging the critical contributions that Williams and XII Corps made to the Union defense.

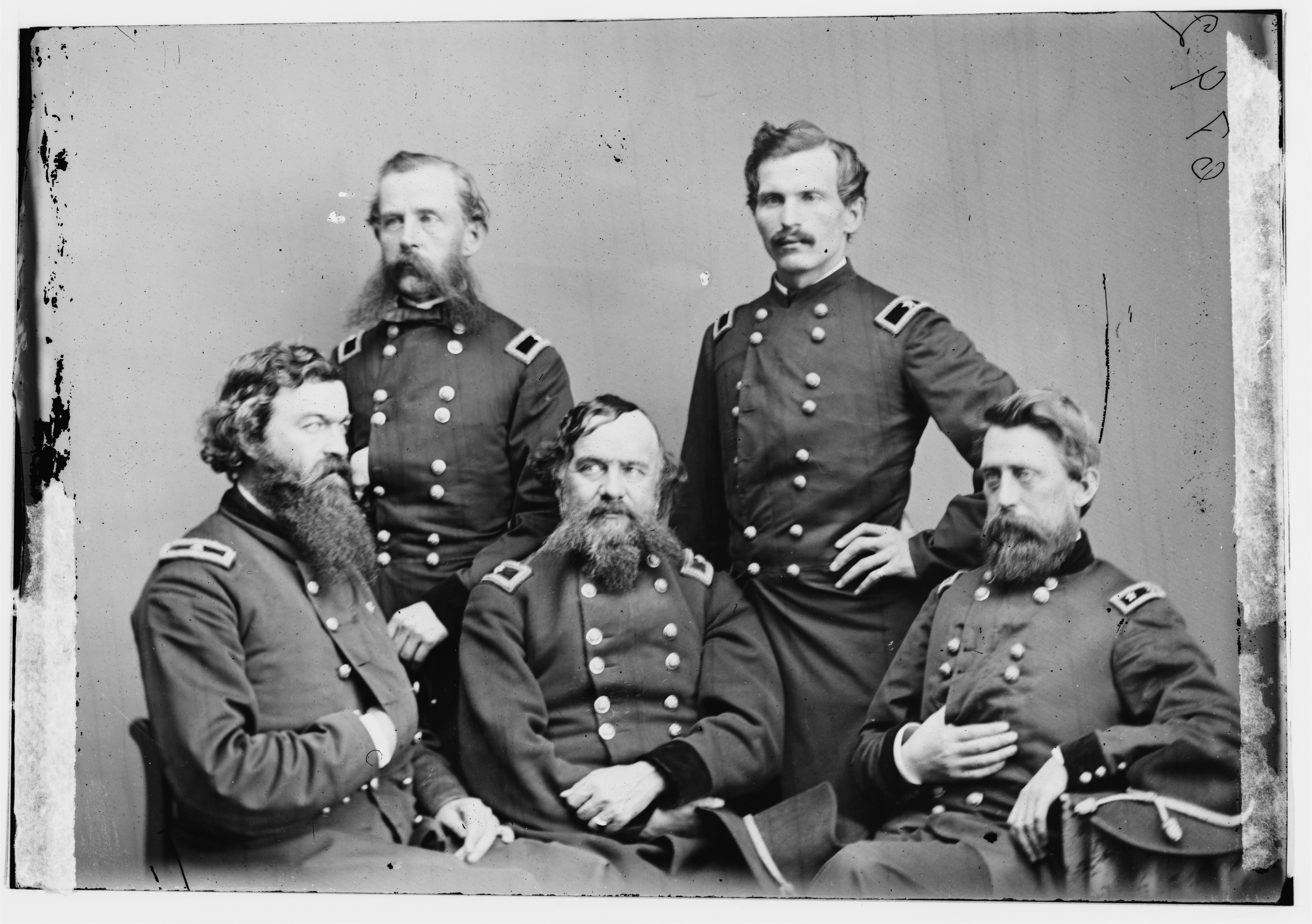
Alpheus S. Williams (center) and Generals Robinson, Baird, Barnum, and Davis ca. 1865

In September 1863, the Union army in Tennessee was defeated at the Battle of Chickamauga and two corps were sent west to help them as they were besieged in Chattanooga—the XI and XII Corps. (They later were combined due to their small sizes into a new XX Corps, Army of the Cumberland.) Williams' division did not reach Chattanooga, but guarded railroads in eastern Tennessee. However, it did join Maj. Gen. William T. Sherman as part of XX Corps in the Atlanta campaign and fought with distinction in a number of battles, particularly the Battle of Resaca. Williams was wounded in the arm at the Battle of New Hope Church on May 26, 1864. His division followed Sherman through his March to the Sea and the Carolinas campaign. In these campaigns Williams led XX Corps until, following the Battle of Bentonville, Joseph A. Mower was given command. Williams resumed leading his division. During this period, Williams received a brevet promotion to major general on January 12, 1865.

Williams held the distinction of being the longest-serving division commander in the Union army, having led his division continually from March 13, 1862 until the end of the war barring temporary absences and corps command. He led his division in the Grand Review of the Armies in Washington D.C. in May 1865. Despite his seniority and long record of dependable service over three years, Williams was inexplicably never promoted—he remained at the rank of brigadier general despite commanding a division, which was supposed to be led by a major general, nor did he get permanent command of a corps.

=== Horses ===
Throughout much of the war, Williams had two horses – Yorkshire and Plug Ugly. Because Yorkshire was more showy, Williams often preferred the larger Plug Ugly for more grueling duty. During the Battle of Chancellorsville, a Confederate shell landed in the thick mud underneath Plug Ugly. The subsequent explosion sent both horse and rider into the air. Remarkably, Williams was uninjured, and the horse escaped with a few minor injuries. Plug Ugly eventually became too worn for further use, and in 1864, Williams sold him for $50. Williams learned that the horse died not long after the sale.

== Postbellum ==
After the war, Williams served as a military administrator in southern Arkansas until he left the service on January 15, 1866. He returned to Michigan, but faced financial difficulties that forced him to take a post as the U.S. Minister at San Salvador, a position in which he served until 1869. He ran for governor of Michigan in 1870, but was not elected.

Williams was elected as a Democrat to the 45th United States Congress from Michigan's 1st congressional district, serving from March 4, 1875, to December 21, 1878. For part of his time in congress he served as chairman of the Committee on the District of Columbia.

Williams suffered a stroke on December 21, 1878, and died in the U.S. Capitol Building. He is buried in Elmwood Cemetery in Detroit.

== Legacy ==
Williams was a general who never received much public recognition. Despite fighting in important commands, he remained a brigadier general throughout most of the war. There were three reasons likely for the situation: first, he was not a West Point graduate, and the "old boys network" was as effective in the 19th century as it is today; second, during the formative months of the Army of the Potomac, Williams was stationed in the Shenandoah Valley, which denied him familiarity to the high command when reputations were being established; third, Williams was never comfortable mastering the common practice of promoting himself to the public with the help of friendly newspaper correspondents. Williams did, however, communicate well with his family, and the letters he wrote throughout the war were saved and published posthumously in 1959 as the well-regarded book, From the Cannon's Mouth: The Civil War Letters of General Alpheus S. Williams.

== Honors ==
An equestrian memorial to Williams by sculptor Henry Shrady stands in Belle Isle Park, in his home town of Detroit. Williams Avenue in the Gettysburg National Military Park is named for him.

== See also ==
- List of American Civil War generals (Union)
- List of members of the United States Congress who died in office (1790–1899)

== Notes ==
Party political offices
| Preceded by William M. Fenton | Democratic nominee for Governor of Michigan; 1866 | Succeeded by John Moore |
Military offices
| Preceded by Nathaniel Banks | Commander of the XII Corps (Army of the Potomac); September 12, 1862 – September 15, 1862 | Succeeded by Joseph K. Mansfield |
| Preceded by Joseph K. Mansfield | Commander of the XII Corps (Army of the Potomac); September 17, 1862 – October 20, 1862 | Succeeded by Henry W. Slocum |
| Preceded by Henry W. Slocum | Commander of the XII Corps (Army of the Potomac); July 1, 1863 – July 4, 1863 | Succeeded by Henry W. Slocum |
| Preceded by Henry W. Slocum | Commander of the XII Corps (Army of the Potomac); August 31, 1863 – September 13, 1863 | Succeeded by Henry W. Slocum |
U.S. House of Representatives
| Preceded by Moses W. Field | Member of the U.S. House of Representatives from Michigan's 1st congressional district 1875–1878 | Succeeded by John S. Newberry |
Diplomatic posts
| Preceded by James R. Partridge | United States Minister to El Salvador; January 21, 1867 – October 27, 1869 | Succeeded by Alfred T. A. Torbert |
