= Fenton Museum =

Museum in Fenton, Michigan

Coordinates: 42.79353°N 83.70552°W

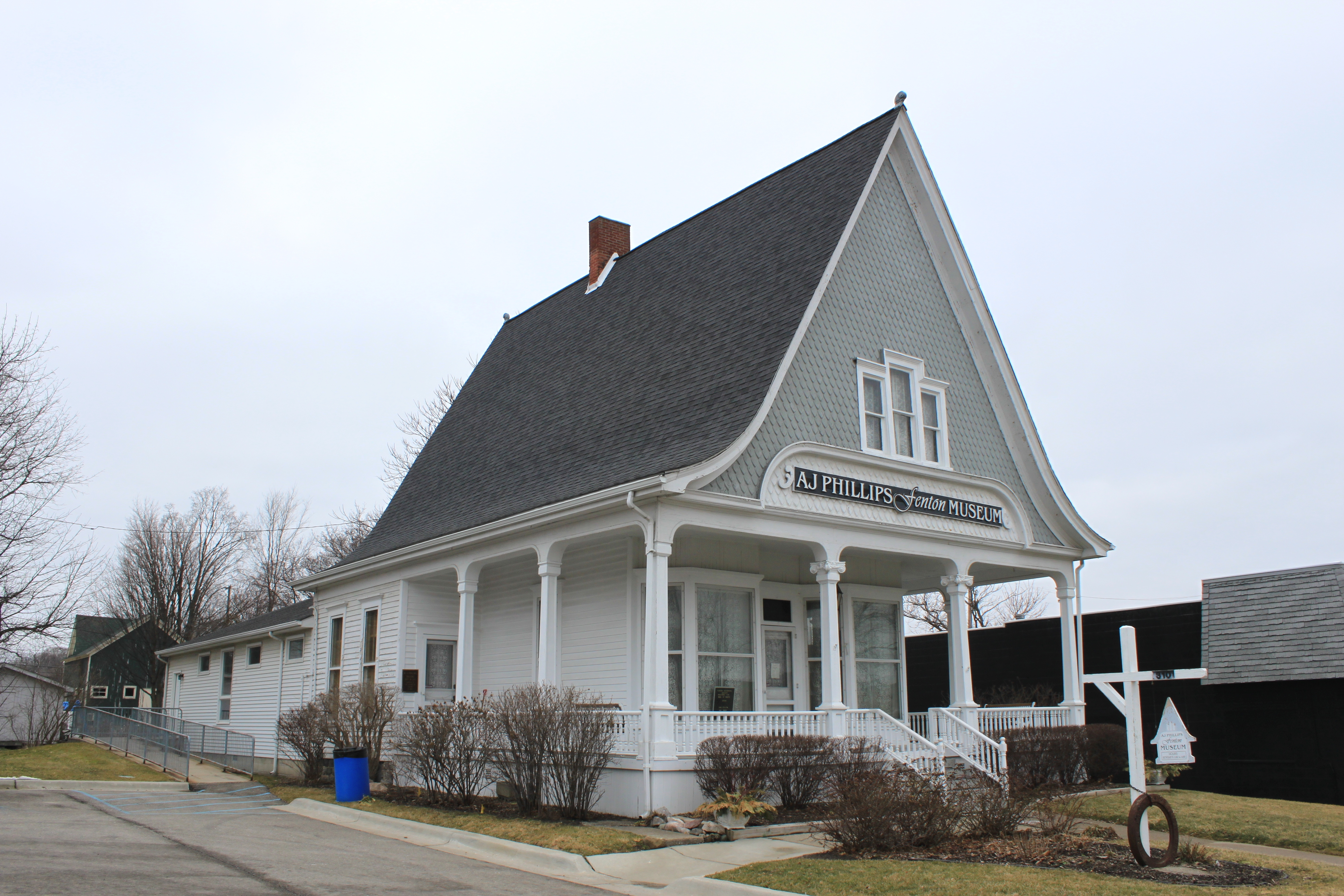
A.J. Phillips Fenton Museum building

The A.J. Phillips Fenton Museum and Historical Society is a museum located in a historic building in Fenton, Michigan. The building was constructed in 1900 and donated by the heirs of Andrew Jackson Phillips to the City of Fenton in 1906. The building was used as the Fenton Library, now renamed the Jack R. Winegarden Library, before the library was relocated to the old Post Office building.

The A.J. Phillips building is owned and maintained by the City of Fenton. Its holdings are owned by the Fenton Historical Society. The museum includes an extensive genealogy room cataloging residents of Fenton and the surrounding area including cemetery records for much of Genesee County. The Victorian Room is a reproduction of A.J. Phillips' personal office and includes some of his furniture. The museum also holds vintage pieces of clothing, tools, vintage televisions and old photography equipment. Military items in the museum are from the U.S. Civil War, the Spanish–American War, World War I, World War II and Vietnam War. The collection includes the sword belonging to Col. William Fenton, given to him by the City of Flint, Michigan when he took command of the 8th Michigan Volunteer Infantry Regiment.
