= William M. Fenton =

American politician (1808–1871)

William Matthew Fenton
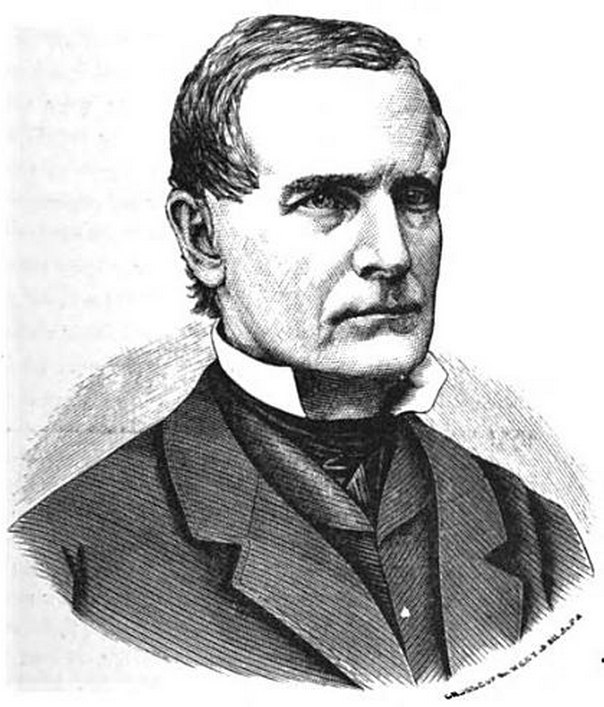

7th Lieutenant Governor of Michigan
- In office 1848–1852
- Governor: Epaphroditus Ransom; John S. Barry
- Preceded by: Charles P. Bush
- Succeeded by: Calvin Britain

Member of the Michigan Senate from the 6th district
- In office 1846–1847
- Preceded by: Gardner D. Williams
- Succeeded by: Andrew Parsons
- Constituency: 6th District

4th Mayor of the City of Flint, Michigan
- In office 1858–1860
- Preceded by: Henry M. Henderson
- Succeeded by: Henry H. Crapo

1st Alderman
- In office 1855–1856 Serving with Alvin T. Crosman
- Preceded by: none
- Succeeded by: Henry I. Higgins
- Constituency: Third Ward, City of Flint

Supervisor
- In office 1847–1848
- Preceded by: William Patterson
- Succeeded by: John L. Gage
- Constituency: Township of Flint

Personal details
- Born: December 19, 1808 Norwich, New York, U.S.
- Died: May 12, 1871 (aged 62)
- Party: Democratic
- Spouse: Adelaide Birdsall
- Relations: Joseph S. Fenton, Father
- Children: Ada B., John Brush, Henry, Sarah R.
- Education: Hamilton College
- Occupation: Sailor, Lawyer

William Matthew Fenton (December 19, 1808 – May 12, 1871) was an American politician from the U.S. state of Michigan. He is the namesake of the city of Fenton, Michigan.

== Early life ==
Fenton was born in Norwich, New York in 1808 and graduated at the top of his class in 1826 at Hamilton College.

== Politics ==
Fenton was elected to the Michigan Senate from the 6th District, representing Genesee, Oakland, Macomb and Livingston counties, 1846–47. He moved to Flint in 1847. In 1847, he was elected Flint Township Supervisor. He served as the seventh lieutenant governor of Michigan from 1848 to 1852 under Governors Epaphroditus Ransom (1848–50) and John S. Barry (1850–52). At the first village elections in 1855, Fenton was elected as a Third Ward Alderman with Alvin T. Crossman. He held the position of register of the U.S. land office at Flint from 1852 until it was moved to East Saginaw, and was mayor of Flint from 1858 to 1859.

Fenton was the Democratic candidate for governor in 1864, losing to Henry Crapo. He erected the large block and public hall in Flint that bear his name.

== Death ==
As chief of the fire department of Flint, while on duty, he received an injury which resulted in his death on May 12, 1871. He was interred at Glenwood Cemetery of Flint.

== See also ==
- Fenton Museum

Party political offices
| Preceded by Byron G. Stout | Democratic nominee for Governor of Michigan; 1864 | Succeeded by Alpheus S. Williams |
Political offices
| Preceded by Charles P. Bush | Lieutenant Governor of Michigan; 1848–1852 | Succeeded by Calvin Britain |
| Preceded by Henry M. Henderson | Mayor of Flint; 1858-60 | Succeeded by Henry H. Crapo |
| Preceded by None | Alderman, of Flint 3rd Ward jointly with Alvin T. Crossman; 1858-59 | Succeeded by Henry I. Higgins |
| Preceded by William Patterson | Supervisor, of Flint Township; 1847-48 | Succeeded by John L. Gage |
