= Fenton, Michigan =

- City
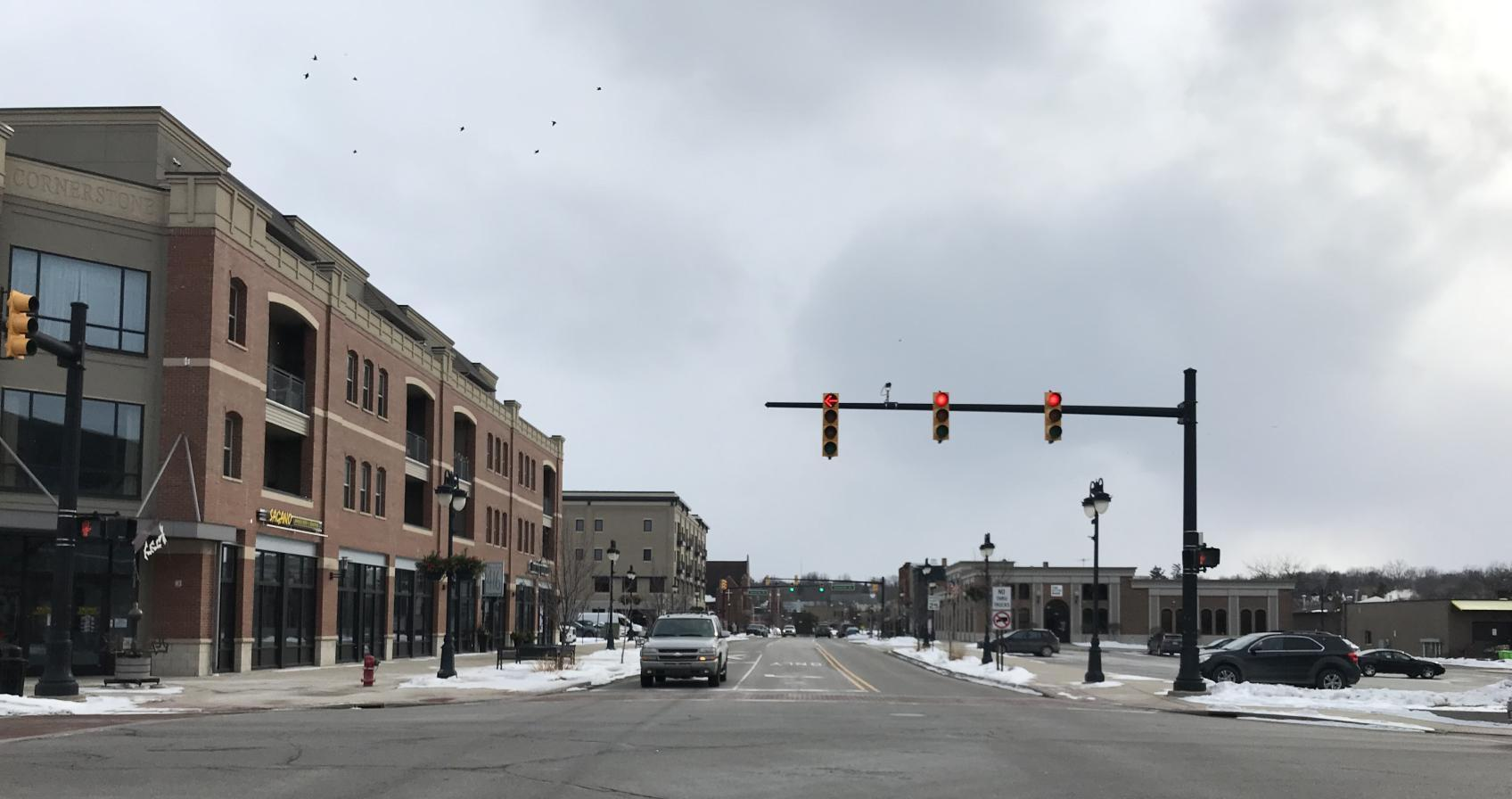
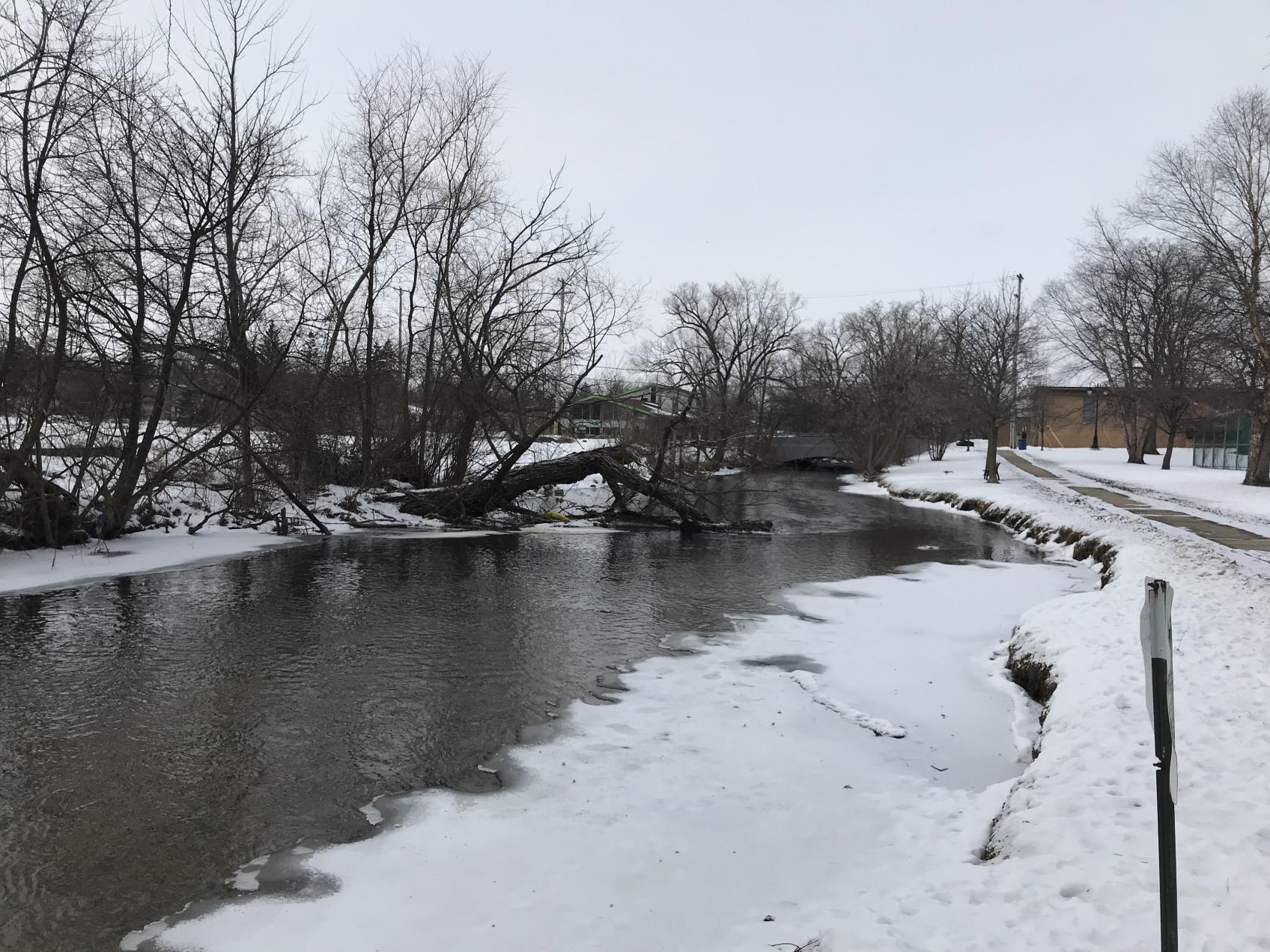
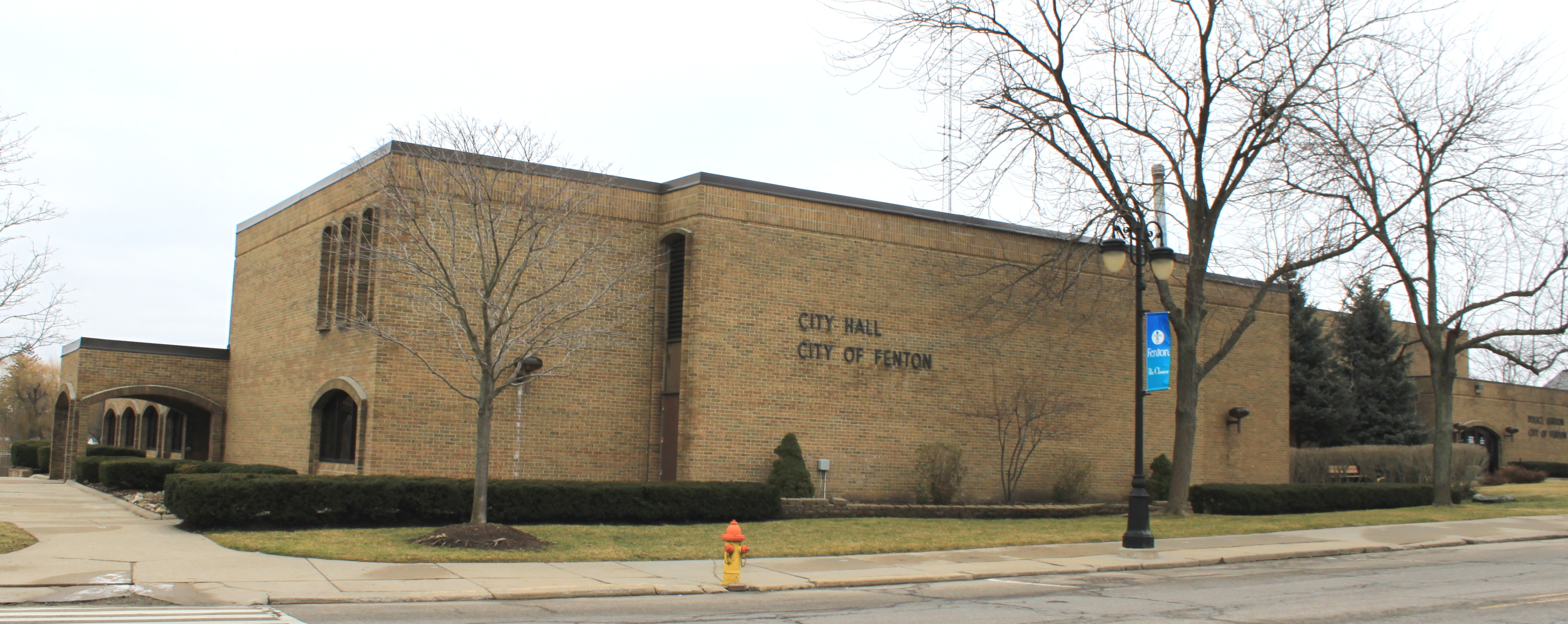
- Clockwise from top: Downtown Fenton; Fenton city hall; Shiawassee River

- Flag Seal Logo
- Motto: "Be Closer"
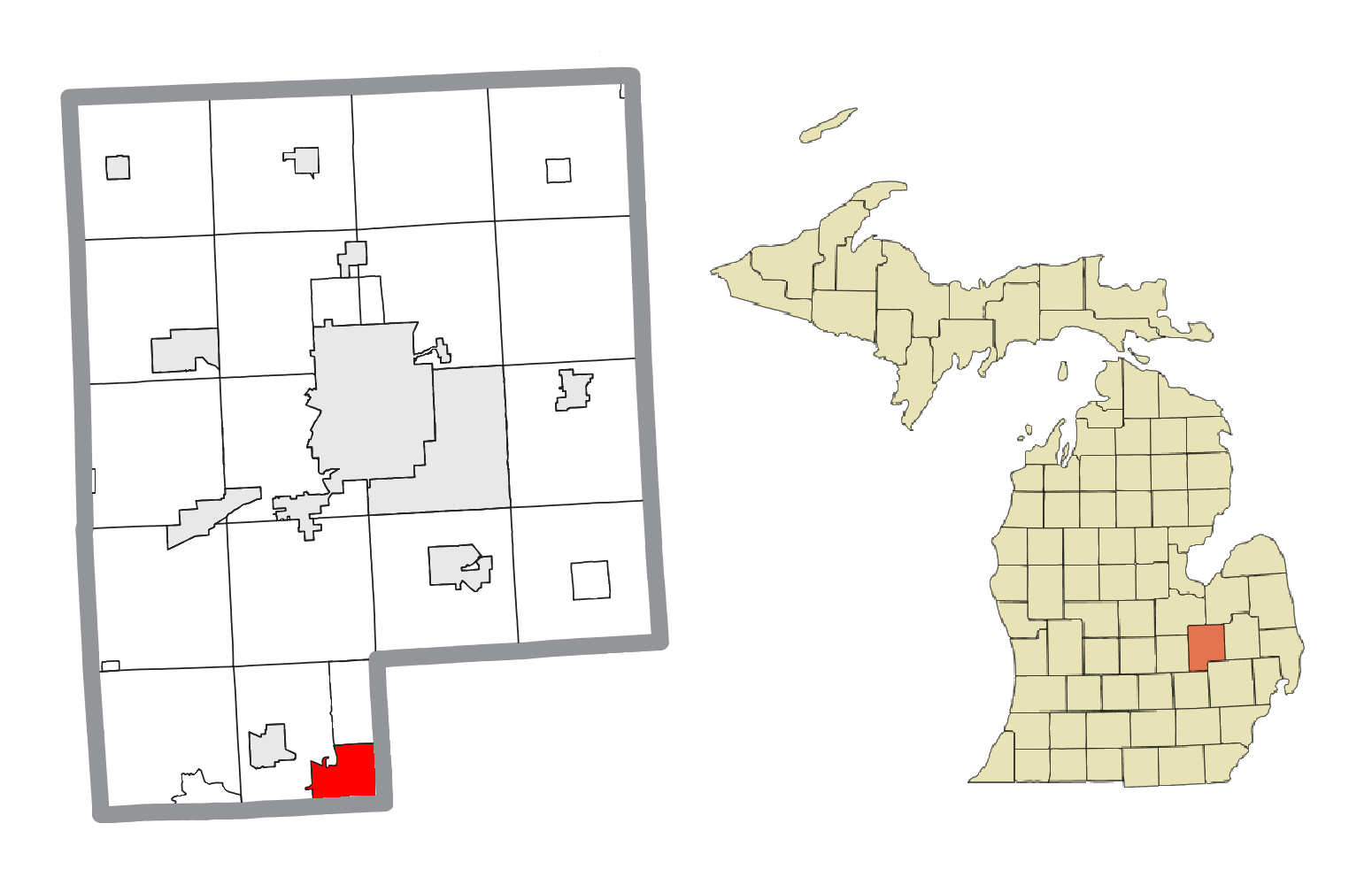
- Location within Genesee County

- Location within the state of Michigan
- Coordinates: 42°47′52″N 83°42′18″W
- Country: United States
- State: Michigan
- Counties: Genesee, Livingston, and Oakland
- Settled: 1834
- Incorporated: 1863 (village); 1964 (city)
- Named for: William M. Fenton

Government
  - Type: Council–manager
  - Mayor: Sue Osborn (I)
  - Mayor Pro Tem: Pat Lockwood
  - City council: Nancy Draves; Brad Jacob; David McDermott; Scott Grossmeyer; Pat Lockwood; Cherie Smith
  - City manager: Lynn Markland

Area
  - Total: 6.98 sq mi (18.07 km^{2})
  - Land: 6.65 sq mi (17.23 km^{2})
  - Water: 0.32 sq mi (0.84 km^{2}) 4.57%
- Elevation: 902 ft (275 m)

Population (2020)
  - Total: 12,050
  - Density: 1,811.7/sq mi (699.49/km^{2})
- Demonym(s): Fentonian, Fentonite
- Time zone: UTC-5 (Eastern (EST))
  - Summer (DST): UTC-4 (EDT)
- ZIP code: 48430
- Area codes: 248 and 810
- FIPS code: 26-27760
- GNIS feature ID: 0625893
- Website: www.cityoffenton.org

Fenton is a city in the U.S. state of Michigan that lies mostly in Genesee County, with small portions in neighboring Oakland and Livingston Counties. The city helps form the Fenton urban area which lies just south of the Flint Metropolitan area.

As of the 2020 census, Fenton had a population of 12,050.

== History ==
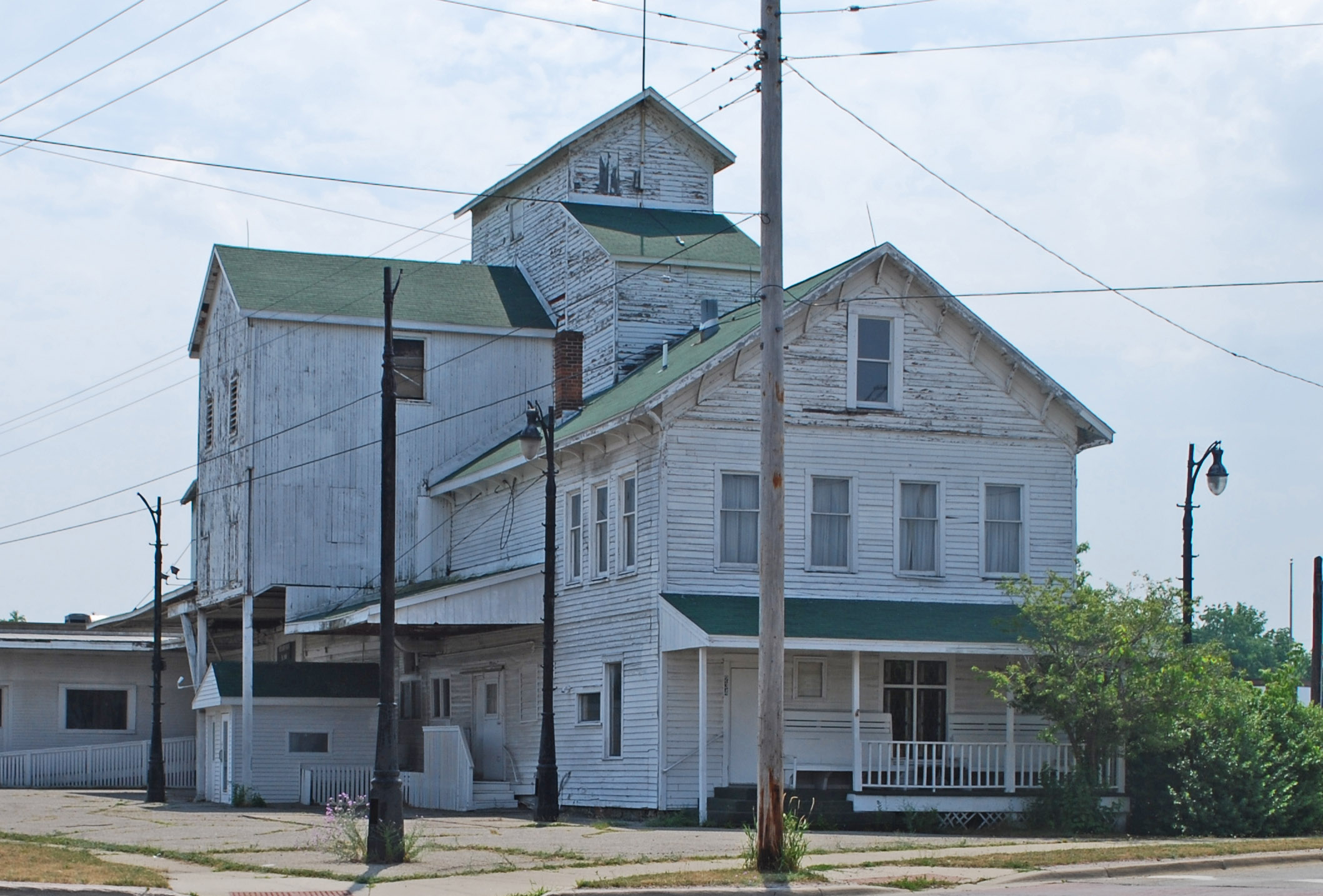
Fenton grain elevator

It was first established in 1834 and was originally named "Dibbleville" after Clark Dibble, one of the first settlers. It was platted in 1837 as "Fentonville" by William M. Fenton who later became lieutenant governor of Michigan. When the settlement was incorporated as a village in 1863 the name Fenton was used. The settlement's post office used the name Fentonville from 1837 until 1886, when it adopted the current name.

In the 1970s, the city leveled its downtown buildings and closed Leroy Street as part of an urban renewal plan. On August 24, 2007, an EF2 tornado hit Fenton, damaging several homes and a school, and almost completely destroying the soon to be opened Tractor Supply Company, tearing off its roof. This left many people without power, putting the city in a state of emergency. There were no fatalities or serious injuries. In July 2011, the first proposed building, Cornerstone, to restore the city's old downtown area was announced.

As of the 2010 census, the city population was 11,756. The city was incorporated from Fenton Township in Genesee County, and the city and township are administratively autonomous. Fenton includes several historic buildings. It was home to the first aviation school in Michigan and the A.J. Phillips Fenton Museum.

== Geography ==
According to the United States Census Bureau, the city has an area of 7.00 square miles (18.13 km^{2}), of which 6.68 square miles (17.30 km^{2}) is land and 0.32 square miles (0.83 km^{2}) (4.57%) is water.

Numerous municipalities in Michigan span two counties, but Fenton is one of two municipalities in Michigan to span three; the other is Lansing. The overwhelming majority of Fenton is in Genesee County, with a total area of 6.88 square miles (17.82 km^{2}), of which 6.56 square miles (16.99 km^{2}) is land and 0.32 square miles (0.83 km^{2}) is water. The Genesee County portion represents 98.29% of Fenton's area and 99.99% of its population. Of Fenton's 11,747 residents, all but 10 live in Genesee County. The other 10 live in Fenton's Livingston County portion, which has a land area of 0.11 square miles (0.28 km^{2}). A minuscule portion with no residents extends into Oakland County with a land area of 0.01 square miles (0.03 km^{2}).

The Tipsico Lake Project is a brownfield redevelopment project to restore the land and surrounding area.

== Demographics ==
Historical population
Census	Pop.	Note	%±
1860	735		—
1870	2,353		220.1%
1880	2,152		−8.5%
1890	2,182		1.4%
1900	2,408		10.4%
1910	2,331		−3.2%
1920	2,507		7.6%
1930	3,171		26.5%
1940	3,377		6.5%
1950	4,226		25.1%
1960	6,142		45.3%
1970	8,284		34.9%
1980	8,098		−2.2%
1990	8,444		4.3%
2000	10,582		25.3%
2010	11,756		11.1%
2020	12,050		2.5%
U.S. Decennial Census

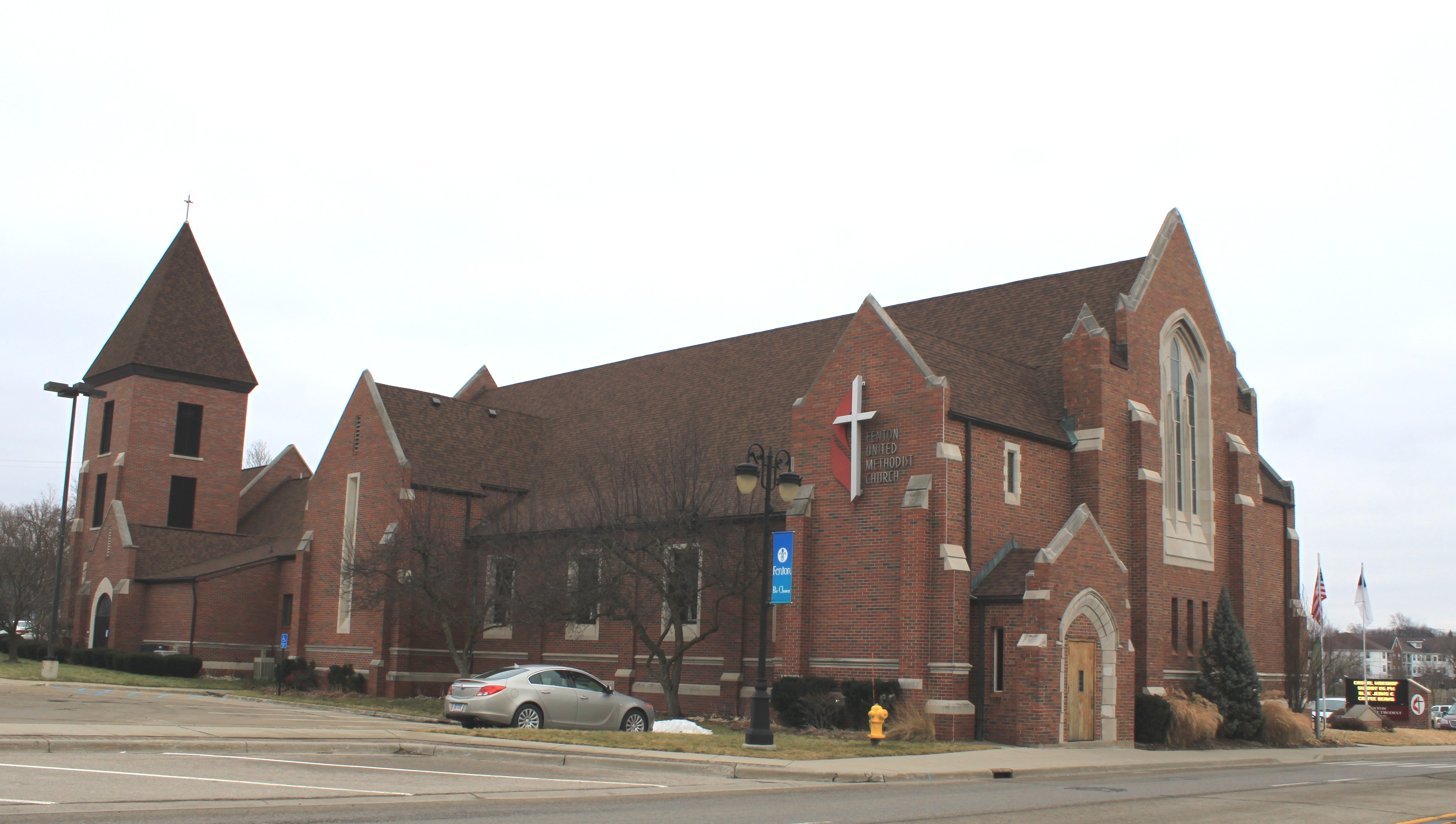
Fenton United Methodist Church

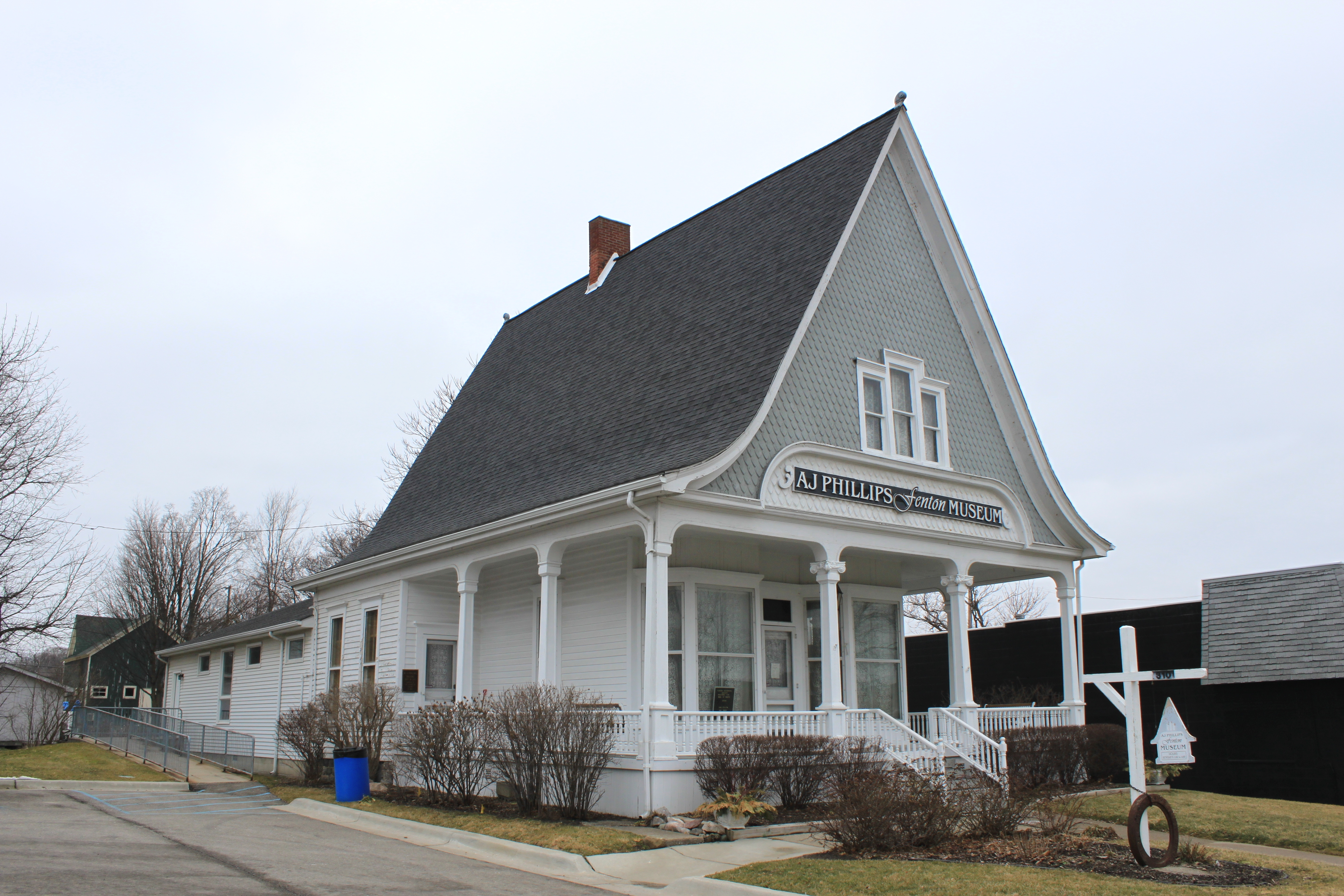
A.J. Phillips Building (1900)

=== 2020 census ===
As of the 2020 census, Fenton had a population of 12,050 and a population density of 1,811.8 inhabitants per square mile (699.5/km^{2}). The median age was 38.5 years. 21.3% of residents were under the age of 18 and 17.3% of residents were 65 years of age or older. For every 100 females there were 85.8 males, and for every 100 females age 18 and over there were 82.5 males age 18 and over.

99.5% of residents lived in urban areas, while 0.5% lived in rural areas.

There were 5,403 households and 3,060 families in Fenton, of which 26.9% had children under the age of 18 living in them. Of all households, 37.5% were married-couple households, 18.8% were households with a male householder and no spouse or partner present, and 35.4% were households with a female householder and no spouse or partner present. About 36.5% of all households were made up of individuals and 16.0% had someone living alone who was 65 years of age or older.

There were 5,776 housing units, of which 6.5% were vacant. The homeowner vacancy rate was 1.4% and the rental vacancy rate was 7.5%.

Racial composition as of the 2020 census
Race	Number	Percent
White	10,524	87.9%
Black or African American	266	2.2%
American Indian and Alaska Native	28	0.2%
Asian	401	3.4%
Native Hawaiian and Other Pacific Islander	2	0.0%
Some other race	36	0.3%
Two or more races	623	6.2%
Hispanic or Latino (of any race)	443	3.7%

=== 2010 census ===
As of the census of 2010, there were 11,756 people, 5,067 households, and 2,953 families living in the city. The population density was 1,759.9 inhabitants per square mile (679.5/km^{2}). There were 5,572 housing units at an average density of 834.1 per square mile (322.0/km^{2}). The racial makeup of the city was 95.1% White, 1.3% African American, 0.3% Native American, 0.7% Asian, 0.5% from other races, and 2.0% from two or more races. Hispanic or Latino residents of any race were 2.5% of the population.

There were 5,067 households, of which 31.9% had children under the age of 18 living with them, 39.8% were married couples living together, 13.2% had a female householder with no husband present, 5.2% had a male householder with no wife present, and 41.7% were non-families. 34.9% of all households were made up of individuals, and 13.5% had someone living alone who was 65 years of age or older. The average household size was 2.27 and the average family size was 2.96.

The median age in the city was 36 years. 24.1% of residents were under the age of 18; 8.9% were between the ages of 18 and 24; 29.7% were from 25 to 44; 22.8% were from 45 to 64, and 14.4% were 65 years of age or older. The gender makeup of the city was 46.8% male and 53.2% female.

=== 2000 census ===
As of the census of 2000, there were 10,582 people, 4,335 households, and 2,709 families living in the city. The population density was 1,612.5 inhabitants per square mile (622.6/km^{2}). There were 4,569 housing units at an average density of 696.2 per square mile (268.8/km^{2}). The racial makeup of the city was 96.25% White, 0.60% African American, 0.39% Native American, 0.95% Asian, 0.66% from other races, and 1.16% from two or more races. Hispanic or Latino residents of any race were 1.80% of the population.

There were 4,335 households, out of which 32.9% had children under the age of 18 living with them, 48.5% were married couples living together, 10.8% had a female householder with no husband present, and 37.5% were non-families. 30.7% of all households were made up of individuals, and 11.2% had someone living alone who was 65 years of age or older. The average household size was 2.38 and the average family size was 3.01.

In the city, 25.4% of the population was under the age of 18, 8.5% was from 18 to 24, 33.7% from 25 to 44, 18.8% from 45 to 64, and 13.6% was 65 years of age or older. The median age was 34 years. For every 100 females, there were 88.5 males. For every 100 females age 18 and over, there were 85.6 males.

The median income for a household in the city was $47,400, and the median income for a family was $55,637. Males had a median income of $44,874 versus $30,435 for females. The per capita income for the city was $22,435. About 4.4% of families and 6.2% of the population were below the poverty line, including 5.9% of those under age 18 and 12.4% of those age 65 or over.

== Infrastructure ==
Schools

- World of Wonder
- North Road Elementary
- State Road Elementary
- Tomek Elementary
- Andrew G. Schmidt Middle School
- Fenton High School

=== Highways ===
US Highway 23 runs north and south through the west side of the city as a freeway. The original routing of US 23 ran northeast along Shiawassee Avenue to Leroy Street, then north along Leroy to the northern edge of the city. The portion of old US 23 south of Silver Lake Road, along with Silver Lake Road itself west back to US 23, was designated a business route of US 23 in 1958, before being removed as a state trunkline in 2006.

=== Utilities ===
The municipality operates its own water system.

== Notable people ==
- Cynthia Roberts Gorton (1826–1894), blind poet and author
- Ira W. Jayne (1882–1961), Wayne County Circuit Court Chief Judge
- Kenny Allen (1994–), American football punter/placekicker
