= Letta Crapo Smith =

American painter

Henrietta (Letta) Crapo Smith
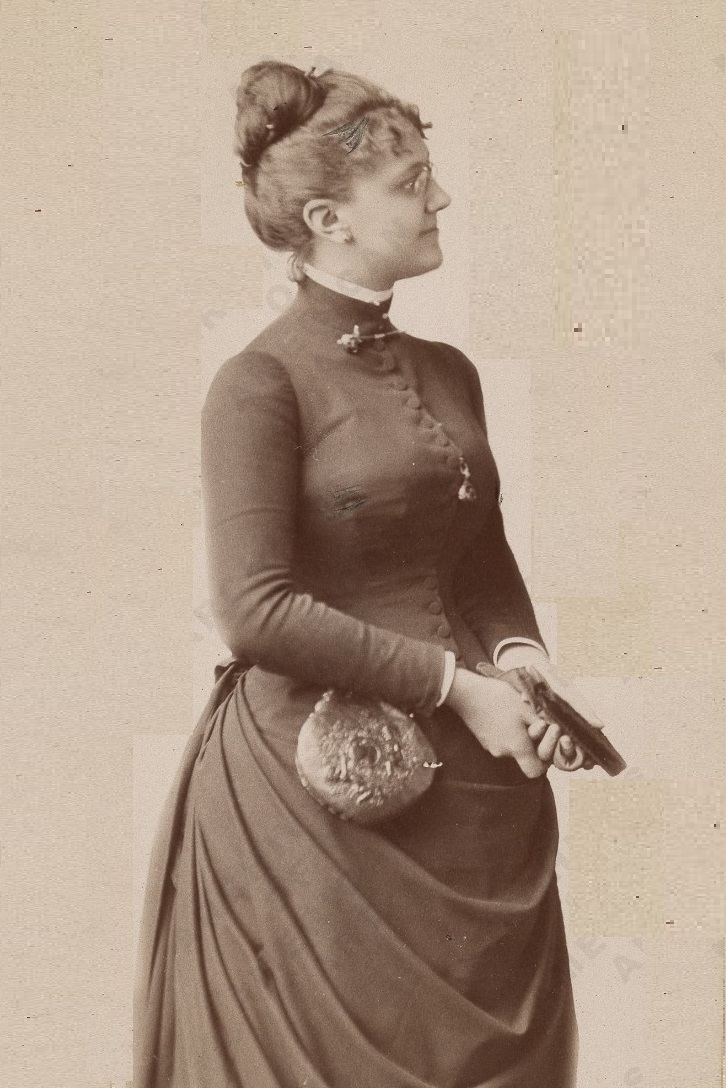
- Photo of Letta Crapo Smith circa 1880
- Born: July 4, 1862; Flint, Michigan
- Died: March 17, 1921 (aged 58); Boston, Massachusetts
- Occupation: artist
- Known for: Detroit artist, floral painter

Henrietta (Letta) Crapo Smith (1862 – 1921) was a painter, known as a color specialist and granddaughter of the former Michigan Governor, Henry H. Crapo.

== Early years ==
Letta Smith was born on 4 July 1862 into the prominent Crapo family of Flint, Michigan. Her father, Humphrey Henry Howland Crapo Smith, was a Michigan lumber baron and her mother, Lucy Ann Crapo, was the daughter of the former Michigan Governor, Henry H. Crapo. Through her mother's side, she was descended from Mayflower passenger William White and Revolutionary War Patriot, Peter Crapo of Massachusetts who served as a Minute Man from 1775 to 1776. Her first cousin was Billy Durant the founder of General Motors and Chevrolet, also of Flint, Michigan.

After her father moved the family to Detroit to establish an exporting center for Michigan lumber, Letta was raised in the prominent society of Detroit. She attended Daughters of the American Revolution functions with her mother. The society papers reported moments of her life which included entertaining at her mother's home, pouring tea for other Detroit society ladies, working on fundraising activities for Detroit charities and taking trips abroad with her mother.

== Artistry ==
In 1890, Smith sailed for Paris to study painting at the Académie Julian in Paris as she was prevented from attending École des Beaux-Arts because she was female. At the Academie, her work was critiqued by prominent French artists William Bouguereau and Tony Robert-Fleury. While in Paris, she was the first woman from Detroit to have her work accepted by a Paris salon.

Smith exhibited her work at the Woman's Building at the 1893 World's Columbian Exposition in Chicago, Illinois.

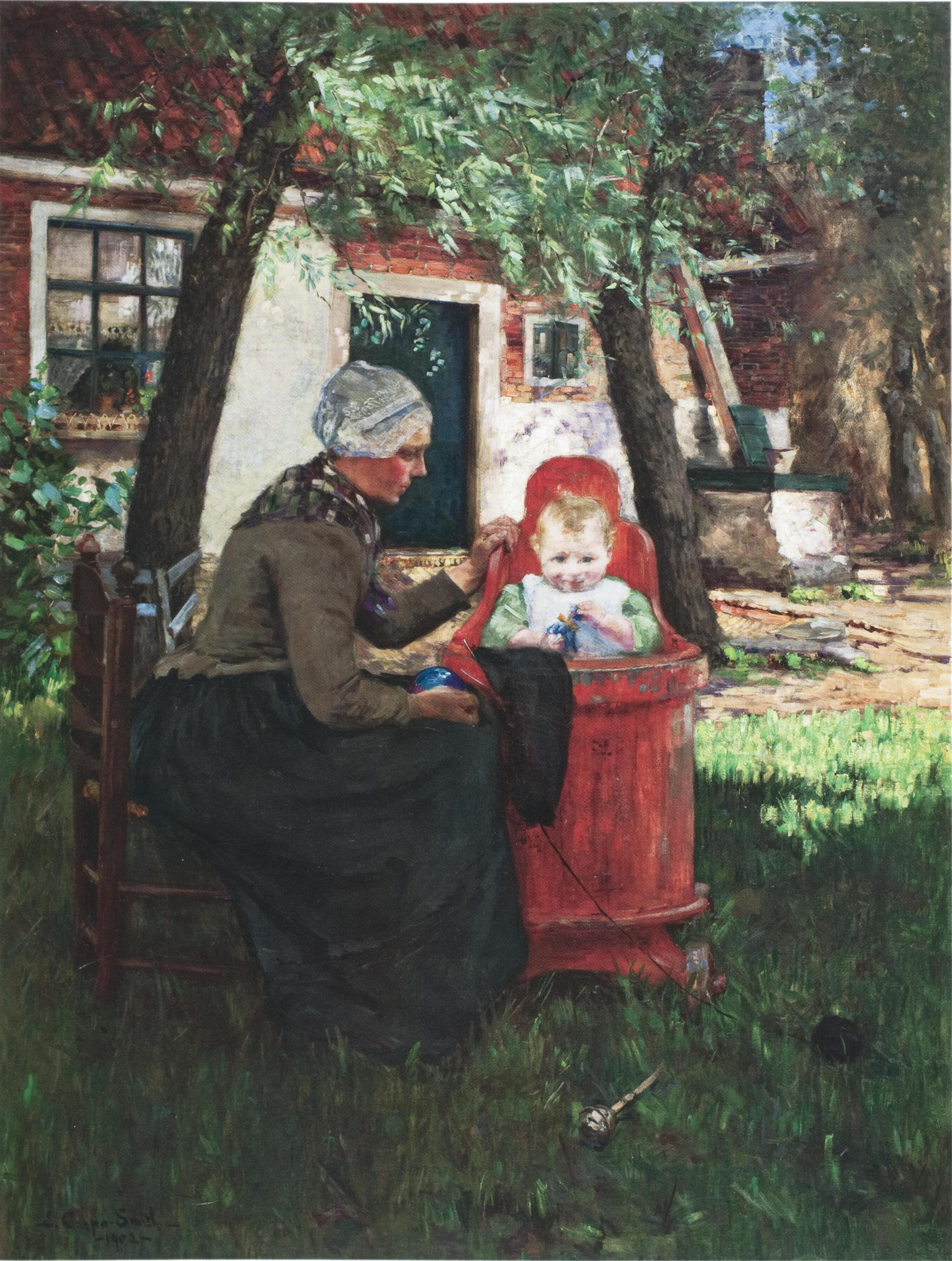
First Birthday

During the summers of 1901 and 1902, she enrolled in George Hitchcock's summer school in Egmond, the Netherlands. Her famous paintings, "A Daughter of Egmond" and "The First Birthday" were the result of this period of artistic study. The First Birthday earned a bronze medal at the St. Louis Exposition and for a period of time, it was displayed in the Louvre. The painting was also exhibited Pennsylvania Academy of Fine Arts and at the Carnegie Institute International Exhibition. Both paintings were placed on long-term loan to the Detroit Institute of Arts who wrote the following about The First Birthday in a 1907 publication:

the color is strikingly portrayed. The variegated notes in the red crib, the greens in sunlight and shadow, the dull tones of the matron's dress and the dull red of the tile and brick of the house, all combine to form one general tone with which no single note conflicts.

She created an art studio in Detroit which was located in her parents' Detroit home at 795 Jefferson Avenue near the corner of Chene and Jefferson. Her Detroit artistic pursuits included studying with other prominent Detroit artist, Julius Rolshoven. During a 1910 exhibition at the Detroit Museum of Art, the following was carried in the papers, "it has been conceded that Miss Letta Crapo-Smith's work stands out for beauty, strength and originality....Miss Smith's Rose Garden, with the girl bending over the flowers, is full of charm." Smith became president of the Detroit Society of Women Painters in 1907 and served in that capacity until 1915, when she became too ill to continue.

== Death ==
In 1914, Letta was diagnosed with tuberculosis which forced her to stop painting. Letta died on 17 March 1921 in Boston. She is interred in the Glenwood Cemetery in Flint with her parents.
