= Supervisor =

Lower-level management position and role in a business or event

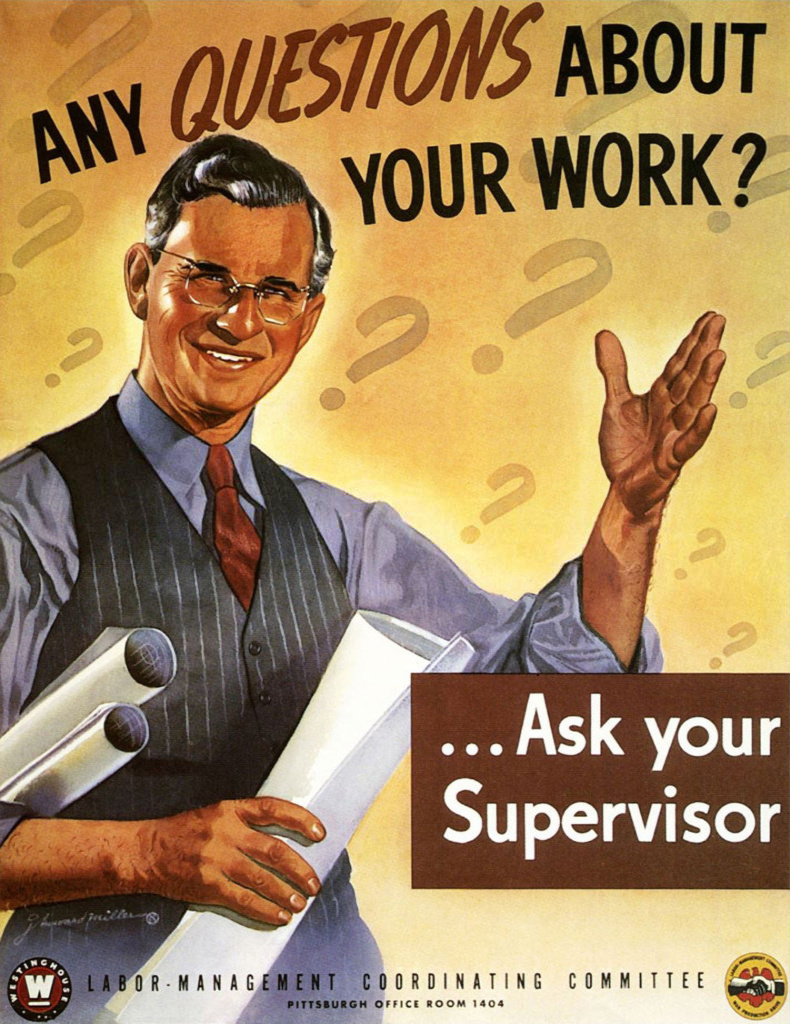
An American poster from the 1940s.

A supervisor, or lead, (also known as foreman, boss, overseer, facilitator, monitor, area coordinator, line-manager or sometimes gaffer) is the job title of a lower-level management position and role that is primarily based on authority over workers or a workplace. A supervisor can also be one of the most senior of the employees at a place of work, such as a professor who oversees a Ph.D. dissertation. Supervision, on the other hand, can be performed by people without this formal title, for example by parents. The term supervisor itself can be used to refer to any personnel who have this task as part of their job description.

An employee is a supervisor if they have the power and authority to do the following actions (according to the Ontario Ministry of Labour):

1. Give instructions and/or orders to subordinates.
2. Be held responsible for the work and actions of other employees.

If an employee cannot do the above, legally, they are most likely not a supervisor, but in some other category, such as a work group leader or lead hand. A supervisor is first and foremost an overseer whose main responsibility is to ensure that a group of subordinates get out the assigned amount of production, when they are supposed to do it and within acceptable levels of quality, costs and safety.

A supervisor is responsible for the productivity and actions of a small group of employees. A supervisor has several manager-like roles, responsibilities and powers. Differences between a supervisor and a manager are: a supervisor typically does not have "hire and fire" authority and a supervisor does not have budget authority. Supervisors are not considered part of the organization's management and instead are seen as senior members of a workforce. Unlike middle managers, supervisors presence is essential for the execution of work.

Lacking "hire and fire" authority means that a supervisor may not recruit employees working in the supervisor's group nor does the supervisor have the authority to terminate an employee. A supervisor may participate in the hiring process as part of interviewing and assessing candidates, but the actual hiring authority rests in the hands of a Human Resource Manager. The supervisor may recommend to management that a particular employee be terminated and the supervisor may be the one who documents the behaviors leading to the recommendation, but the actual firing authority rests on the authority of a manager.

Lacking budget authority means a supervisor is provided a budget developed by upper management within which constraints the supervisor is expected to provide a productive environment for the employees of the supervisor's work group. A supervisor will usually have the authority to make purchases within specified limits. A supervisor is also given the power to approve work hours and other payroll issues. Normally, budget affecting requests such as travel will require not only the supervisor's approval, but the approval of one or more layers of management.

As a member of management, a supervisor's main job is more concerned with orchestrating and controlling work rather than performing it directly.

== Tasks ==
- Carry out policies passed down a hierarchy from superiors/upper management.
- Plan short-range action-steps to carry out goals set by superiors/upper management.
- Organize work groups.
- Assign jobs to subordinates.
- Delegate projects to subordinates.
- Direct tasks, jobs and projects.
- Train subordinates.
- Enforce rules.
- Lead and motivate subordinates.
- Develop group cohesiveness.
- Solve routine daily problems.
- Control or evaluate the performance of subordinates and the department - performance appraisals.
- Discipline subordinates.

"Doing" can take up to 70% of the time - (this varies according to the type of supervisory job - the doing involves the actual work of the department as well as the planning, controlling, scheduling, organizing, leading, etc.).

== Academia ==
In academia, a supervisor is a senior scientist or scholar who, along with their own responsibilities, aids and guides a postdoctoral researcher, postgraduate research student or undergraduate student in their research project; offering both moral support and scientific insight and guidance.

== Gaffer ==
In colloquial British English, "gaffer" means a foreman, and is used as a synonym for "boss". In the UK, the term also commonly refers to sports coaches (football, rugby, etc.).

The term is also sometimes used colloquially to refer to an old man, an elderly rustic. The word is probably a shortening of "godfather", with "ga" from association with "grandfather". The female equivalent, "gammer", came to refer colloquially to an old lady or to a gossip. The use of gaffer in this way can be seen, for example, in J.R.R. Tolkien's character Gaffer Gamgee.

In 16th century English a "gaffer" was a man who was the head of any organized group of labourers. In 16th and 17th century rural England, it was used as a title slightly inferior to "Master", similar to "Goodman", and was not confined to elderly men. The chorus of a famous Australian shearer's song, The Backblocks' Shearer (also known as Widgegoeera Joe), written by W. Tully at Nimidgee, NSW (c.1900), refers to a gaffer:

Hurrah, me boys, my shears are set,
I feel both fit and well;
Tomorrow you’ll find me at my pen
When the gaffer rings the bell.
With Hayden's patent thumb guards fixed
And both my blades pulled back;
Tomorrow I go with my sardine blow
For a century or the sack!

In glassblowing, a gaffer is the central figure in the creation of a piece of art. For example, at the Corning Glass Works in Corning, New York, a gaffer is a skilled artisan who blows through a long tube to shape molten glass into a variety of useful and/or artistic objects. The Gaffer District in Corning is named in honor of these artisans.

== History ==
As industrial and commercial enterprises grew in size - especially after introduction of techniques of the Industrial Revolution - the perceived need for supervisors and foremen grew in tandem. For example: in the antebellum American South the development of the hierarchical model and of practices of plantation economies saw the role of the overseer coming to provide the interface between planters and the indentured servants and slaves.

By 1894 speakers of U.S. English had begun to refer to a subordinate or assistant foreman - sometimes contemptuously - as a straw boss, by analogy with the concept of a "straw man".

== See also ==
- Abusive supervision
- Gaffer (filmmaking)
- Position of trust
- Power (social and political)
- Supervision
