= 2003 Flint mayoral election =

← 2002 (special)	August 5, 2003 (first round); November 4, 2003 (runoff)	2007 →

Candidate	Don Williamson	Floyd Clack	James W. Rutherford
Party	Nonpartisan	Nonpartisan	Nonpartisan
First round	7,159; 48.13%	4,796; 32.25%	2,293; 15.42%
Runoff	13,906; 60.11%	9,228; 39.89%
Mayor before election
James W. Rutherford
Nonpartisan
Elected mayor
Don Williamson
Nonpartisan

The 2003 Flint mayoral election was held on November 4, 2003, following a primary election on August 5, 2003. Incumbent Mayor James W. Rutherford, who was elected in a 2002 special election following the recall of former Mayor Woodrow Stanley, ran for re-election. He was defeated in the primary election by businessman Don Williamson and County Commissioner Floyd Clack, both of whom advanced to the general election. Williamson ultimately defeated Clack in a landslide, winning 60 percent of the vote.

== Primary election ==
=== Candidates ===
- Don Williamson, businessman, 1991 and 1995 candidate for Mayor
- Floyd Clack, Genesee County Commissioner
- James W. Rutherford, incumbent Mayor
- Herbert G. Cleaves, Sr., member of the Flint Board of Education
- Daron Rice, financial analyst, brother of Glen Rice

=== Results ===
2003 Flint mayoral primary election results
Party	Candidate	Votes	%
Nonpartisan	Don Williamson	7,159	48.13%
Nonpartisan	Floyd Clack	4,796	32.25%
Nonpartisan	James W. Rutherford (inc.)	2,293	15.42%
Nonpartisan	Herbert G. Cleaves, Jr.	427	2.87%
Nonpartisan	Daron Rice	198	1.33%
Total votes		14,873	100.00%

== General election ==
=== Results ===
2003 Flint mayoral general election results
Party	Candidate	Votes	%
Nonpartisan	Don Williamson	13,906	60.11%
Nonpartisan	Floyd Clack	9,228	39.89%
Total votes		23,134	100.00%
