= 2002 Flint mayoral special election =

- August 6, 2002

Candidate	James W. Rutherford	A.J. Pointer (write-in)
Party	Nonpartisan	Nonpartisan
Popular vote	11,239	4,712
Percentage	70.42%	29.52%
Mayor before election
Darnell Earley (temporary)
Nonpartisan
Elected mayor
James W. Rutherford
Nonpartisan

The 2002 Flint mayoral special election took place on August 6, 2002. On March 5, 2002, voters recalled Mayor Woodrow Stanley, and city administrator Darnell Earley became temporary mayor. A special election was originally scheduled for May 7, 2002, but the state legislature cancelled the election to allow Governor John Engler to appoint a financial review team to evaluate the city's finances. The election was ultimately rescheduled for August 6, 2002. On May 22, 2002, Engler declared a financial emergency in the city, and appointed Ed Kurtz, the President of Baker College, as emergency financial manager on July 8. As a result, following the state takeover, the winner of the special election would have fewer powers.

While several candidates planned on running, former Mayor James W. Rutherford ended up being the only candidate to appear on the ballot. After the Reverend A.J. Pointer failed to qualify from the ballot, he announced that he would run as a write-in candidate. Though Pointer attracted a significant level of support for a write-in candidate, Rutherford ultimately won handily, receiving 70 percent of the vote to Pointer's 30 percent, becoming the oldest person to be elected as Mayor.

== Candidates ==
- James W. Rutherford, former Mayor
- A.J. Pointer, pastor of the Metropolitan Baptist Church

== Results ==
2002 Flint mayoral special election results
Party	Candidate	Votes	%
Nonpartisan	James W. Rutherford	11,239	70.42%
Nonpartisan	A.J. Pointer (write-in)	4,712	29.52%
Write-in		10	0.06%
Total votes		15,961	100.00%
