= Bruce J. McDonald (Michigan politician) =

American politician (1866–1923)

44th Mayor of the City of Flint, Michigan
- In office 1904–1905
- Preceded by: Austin D. Alvord
- Succeeded by: David D. Aitken

Personal details
- Born: August 26, 1866 Lakeport, Michigan
- Died: June 1, 1923 (aged 56) family home, E. Fifth Street, Flint, Michigan
- Resting place: Glenwood Cemetery, Flint, Michigan
- Party: Grace Baird
- Occupation: banker
- Profession: financial

Bruce J. McDonald (August 26, 1866 – June 1, 1923) was a Michigan politician. He was a Masons and the Knights Templar member.

== Early life ==
McDonald was born in Lakeport, Michigan. At age thirteen, he move to Flint to attend Flint Union High School. After he received his high school diploma, he was employed as a messenger by the First Union Bank. He continued working there and was over time promoted reaching the position of cashier.

== Political life ==
He was elected as the Mayor of City of Flint in 1904 for a single 1 year terms.

== Post-political life ==
MacDonald was married Grace Baird to in 1907 and had three children. In 1917 and 32 service years, he resigned from First Union Bank. He also served on the board of directors of the First National and the Genesee County Savings Banks. Additional, he served treasurer of the Home Builders and the firm Stone, MacDonald and Kaufman. Becoming sick in 1921, he travel to Battle Creek to be cured only to return to Hurley Hospital, Flint and lost his leg. On June 1, 1923, he died at his east Fifth Street home and was buried in Glenwood Cemetery, Flint.

Political offices
Preceded by Austin D. Alvord	Mayor of Flint; 1904–1905	Succeeded by David D. Aitken
