= George R. Gold =

American politician (1830–1902)

39th Mayor of the City of Flint, Michigan
- In office 1898–1899
- Preceded by: Milton C. Pettibone
- Succeeded by: Hugh Alexander Crawford

10th Recorder (law)
- In office 1867–1869
- Preceded by: Alvin T. Crossman
- Succeeded by: Anson S. Withee
- Constituency: City of Flint

Personal details
- Born: October 9, 1830 Cornwall, Connecticut, U.S.
- Died: June 1, 1902 (aged 71) Flint, Michigan

George Ruggles Gold (October 9, 1830 – June 1, 1902) was a Michigan politician.

== Early life ==
He served as a director of the Genesee County Savings Bank.

== Political life ==
In 1867, Gold was elected to the first of two terms in the office of Flint City Recorder. He was elected as the Mayor of City of Flint in 1898 for a single 1-year term.

Political offices
Preceded by Milton C. Pettibone	Mayor of Flint; 1898-99	Succeeded by Hugh Alexander Crawford
