= Samuel Randall =

Samuel Randall may refer to:

- Samuel J. Randall (1828–1890), Pennsylvania politician, attorney and soldier
- Samuel C. Randall (1837–1909), Michigan politician
