= Cull (surname) =

Cull is a surname.

Notable people with the surname include:

- Dave Cull (1950–2021), New Zealand politician
- Edwin E. Cull (1891–1956), American architect
- Elizabeth Cull (born 1952), Canadian politician, teacher, and broadcast panel member
- Frederika Alexis Cull (born 1999), Indonesian beauty pageant titleholder
- Harry K. Cull (1911–2000), American politician
- John Cull (1951–2022), Australian politician
- Nicholas J. Cull (born 1964), British writer
