= Knights of the Maccabees =

North American fraternal organization

- Founded: 1878; 148 years ago London, Ontario, Canada
- Type: Benefit society
- Affiliation: Independent
- Status: Defunct
- Scope: North America
- Motto: Astra Castra Numen Lumen "The stars my camp, the Deity my light"
- Nickname: The Maccabees
- Headquarters: Southfield, Michigan; United States

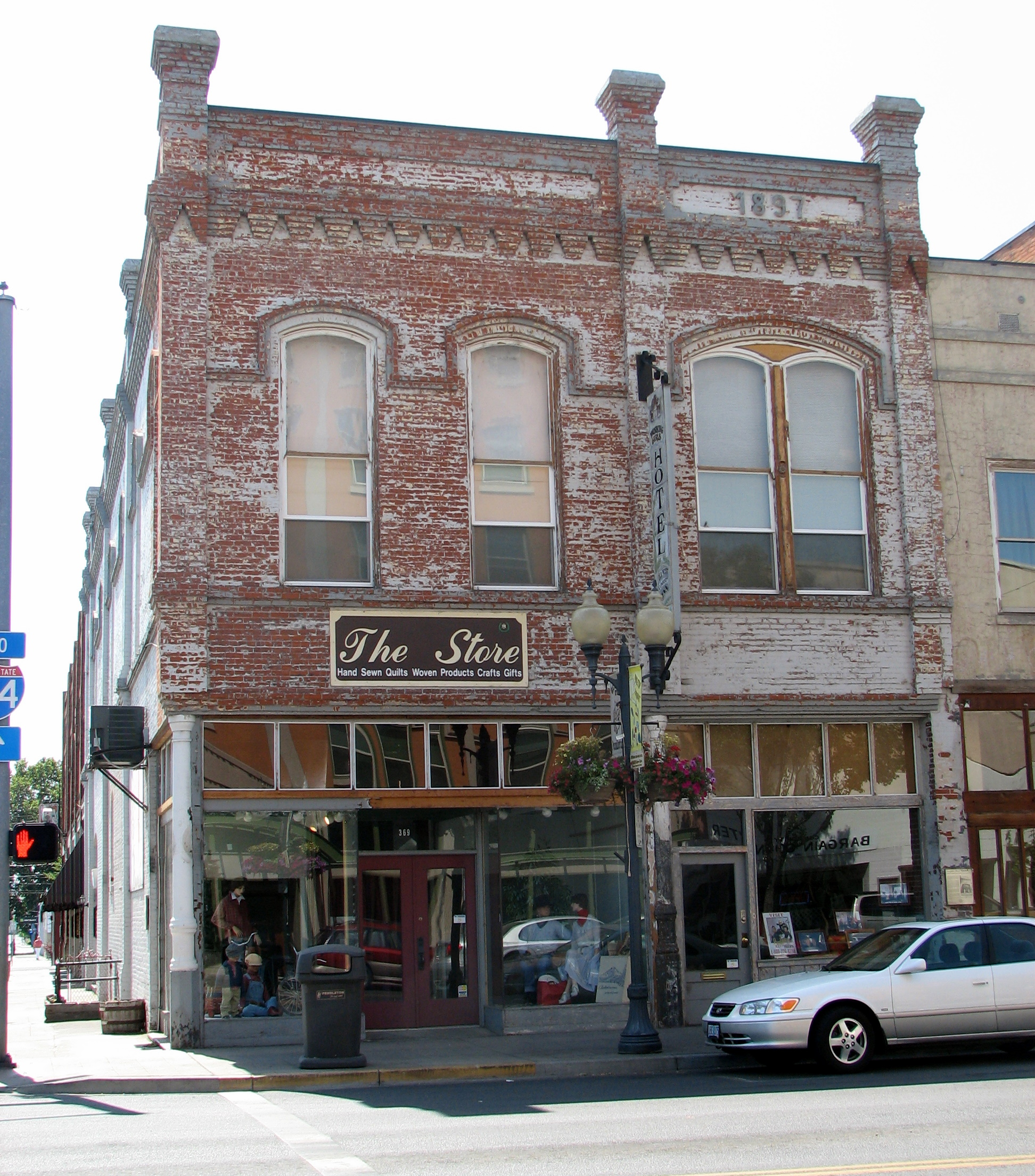
The KOTM Temple in Pendleton, Oregon, was listed on the National Register of Historic Places in 1982.

Knights of the Maccabees was a fraternal organization formed in 1878 in London, Ontario, Canada. Most active in the U.S. state of Michigan, the group's fraternal aspects took a back seat to providing low-cost insurance to members. In the society's early years, it also provided other final-expense related benefits such as society cemeteries.

The motto of the Knights of Maccabees was the Latin phrase "Astra Castra Numen Lumen" ,which means "The stars my camp, the Deity my light".

== History ==
The Knights of the Maccabees was founded in London, Ontario by members of the Order of the Foresters. They based their name, ceremonies, and rituals on the Maccabees, a group of Jewish rebels against the Seleucid Empire whose exploits are described in the Books of the Maccabees, considered part of the Biblical canon in Catholicism, but apocryphal in Judaism and Protestant Christianity. The first convention was held on August 7, 1878.

The group grew rapidly in Canada and several US states, reaching 10,000 members by 1880. The organization was not on an actuarially sound basis - no medical exams were required of new members, and assessments of death was 10 cents for each member. As death claims began piling up, the organization's expenses began to outweigh its income. A group of businessmen in Michigan, where the order had a number of members, endeavored to put the Maccabees on a sound financial basis.

To this end, a "grand review" was held in Buffalo, New York, in 1880 to reorganize the society, drawing up a new constitution and laws. Major Nathan Boynton was elected the new Supreme Lieutenant Commander. This created a brief schism with the Canadian group seceding under a man named McLaughlin. In 1881, the two factions' representatives met at Port Huron, Michigan, and they agreed to reconcile their differences. A committee was appointed, chaired by Boynton, to draft a new constitution acceptable to both factions, and this was agreed to in February 1881.

Under the new constitution, Great Camps could be formed in states or provinces with more than 1,000 members and the Supreme Tent (overall organization) operated the beneficiary aspect of the organization. The Great Camp of Michigan was incorporated in that state on June 11, 1881, which was considered the foundation date of the reorganized order. Organizational stability remained elusive. At the Supreme Tent in July 1881, the Michigan delegates obtained an amendment to allow individual Great Camps to establish their own beneficiary programs, anticipating that the national organization would become defunct. By 1882, the order had indeed become dormant outside of Michigan, and Boynton became Great Record Keeper and then Great Commander of the state. The Supreme Tent was then revived, again, in September 1883.

In 1914, the organization changed its name from the Knights of the Maccabees to simply the Maccabees. In terms of finances and benefits, the Maccabees adopted the National Fraternal Congress Tables in 1911 and the American Mortuary Table of Rates in 1920. A "Supreme Review" conducted in 1958, the Macabees became a mutual life insurance company effective 1961, though still kept some fraternal features.

Organizationally, the group suffered a split in 1905, when a group called the Western Bees seceded in 1905. This group eventually merged with the Highland Nobles in 1911. In the 1930s, the Maccabees began absorbing some smaller fraternal benefit societies, including the Brotherhood of America in 1935, the Slavic Progressive Beneficial Union in 1937, and the Michigan Union Life Association] in 1941.

=== 20th century ===
By 1920, the ladies' auxiliary, Ladies of the Maccabees, claimed more than 200,000 members. In 1926, the Maccabees established their headquarters at the Maccabees Building in downtown Detroit, Michigan.

In 1941, the Maccabees gained control of the Michigan Union Life Association, furthering its transformation from a benefit society into a modern, legal-reserve insurance company. In 1960, the Maccabees relocated to a new building in Southfield, Michigan - a suburb of Detroit. In 1962, the group changed its name again, this time to the Maccabees Mutual Life Insurance Company.

In 1986, they built new 251,000-square-foot (23,300 m^{2}) office building, in Southfield, Michigan. In the 1990s, the organization was demutualized and sold to the Royal Insurance Group and operated under the name Royal Maccabees Life Insurance Company. In 1999, Royal Maccabees was sold by its parent company, Royal & SunAlliance Financial Services, to Swiss Re. Swiss Re merged it into its subsidiary, Reassure America Life Insurance Company.

== Organization ==
The group was structured on a three-tiered model, with local Subordinate Camps, Great Camps at the district level, and the whole considered the Supreme Tent. By the 1970s, the local groups were called Subordinate Units. Head offices were traditionally in Detroit, but in 1965, they were moved to Southfield, Michigan.

The Ladies of the Maccabees were the group's female auxiliary.

== Membership ==
Membership was open to all white persons between 18 and 70, though those over 52 were ineligible for the beneficiary features. Applicants had to be of good moral character, bodily healthy, and socially acceptable. Furthermore, those engaged in extra-hazardous occupations, such as coal miners, electric linemen, aeronauts, people engaged in blasting, the manufacture of highly flammable or explosive material, and submarine officers were excluded from membership. Also, no one who was involved in the liquor trade or an alcoholic was admitted. Certain classes of railway employees, expressmen, miners (excluding coal miners) and firemen had to pay an additional 25 cents assessment per each $1,000.

On December 1, 1896, the Knights had 182,000 members in 40 states and provinces, though a third of the membership was in Michigan. The death rate among the membership was 5.54 per 1,000, which was considered exceptionally low. They also had a permanent headquarters in Port Huron, which had opened in 1892. By 1915, membership had reached 331,756, but by 1978 membership was down to about 10,000 About 3,500 members were in the US and Canada in 1994.

=== Degrees ===
- Degree of Protection - In the Degree of Protection, the candidate was introduced to the demands of Honor, Courage, and Obedience. The candidate learned the history of Maccabee household and how it protected Judea from King Antiochus during the war of independence. To prove themselves fit to "join in the cause of humanity," the tyros had to undergo an ordeal.
- Degree of Friendship - In the Degree of Friendship, the Commander takes the part of Mattathias, the Lt. Commander that of Judas, the Past Commander that of John (son of Mattathias), and the Chaplain that of Eleazar (son of Mattathias). The candidate received instruction in the nature of friendship.
- Degree of Loyalty - In the Degree of Loyalty, the dramatic work revolved around the following characters: Apelles, Mattathias, Matthathias's four sons, Judas, Soldiers, while the candidate, Sentinel, and a Knight took the parts of Jewish peasants. In keeping with the Maccabee legend of the revolt at Modin, the patriarch Mattathias remained steadfast to the Jewish religion when ordered to make sacrifice to Greek gods and at great personal risk stops an apostate Jew from offering sacrifice to false gods. The lesson derived from his example was that of genuine patriotism and inculcated the duty to uphold and defend the rights of liberty and conscience when they are threatened by irresponsible power in any form. Additionally, the candidate was reintroduced to the ghost of Eleazar and finally sees the end of the rebellion.

== Notable members ==
=== Members ===
- Frank D. Baker
- Martha E. Cram Bates
- Warren Antoine Cartier
- Thomas J. Cox
- Frank Fitzgerald
- Daniel P. Markey
- Oronhyatekha
- Milton C. Pettibone
- Treffle Raiche
- Winfred J. Sanborn

== See also ==
- Knights of the Maccabees Hall
