= Oliver Tappin =

American politician (1893–1945)

70th / 8th City Commission Mayor of the City of Flint, Michigan
- In office 1940–1940
- Preceded by: Harry M. Comins
- Succeeded by: William Osmund Kelly

City Commissioner of the City of Flint, Michigan

Personal details
- Born: June 16, 1893 Flintville, Wisconsin
- Died: November 18, 1945 (aged 52) Flint, Michigan

Oliver Ransom Tappin (June 16, 1893 – November 18, 1945) was a Michigan politician.

== Political life ==
The Flint City Commission select him as mayor in 1940.

Political offices
Preceded by Harold E. Bradshaw	Mayor of Flint; 1940	Succeeded by William Osmund Kelly
