= James A. Sharp Jr. =

American politician (1933–2023)

87th Mayor of the City of Flint
- In office 1983–1987
- Preceded by: James W. Rutherford
- Succeeded by: Matthew S. Collier

Personal details
- Born: May 28, 1933
- Died: July 2, 2023 (aged 90)
- Party: Democratic

James A. Sharp Jr. (May 28, 1933 – July 2, 2023) was an American politician who served as mayor of the City of Flint, Michigan, and the second "strong" mayor under Flint's 1974 Charter.

== Career ==
Sharp defeated James W. Rutherford in his attempt at a third term for Flint Mayor, effectively becoming the city's first popularly elected African American mayor; the city's first African American mayor Floyd J. McCree, who served between 1966 and 1968, had been selected by the Flint City Commission. In 1984, Sharp was selected as alternate delegate to the Democratic National Convention from Michigan. Sharp was defeated by Matthew S. Collier in 1987.

== Death ==
Sharp died on July 2, 2023, at the age of 90.

== See also ==
- List of first African-American mayors

Political offices
Preceded by James W. Rutherford	Mayor of Flint; 1983–1987	Succeeded by Matthew S. Collier
