= Harold Bradshaw =

Harold Bradshaw may refer to:

- Harold Chalton Bradshaw (1893–1943), British architect
- Harold E. Bradshaw (1898–1975), American politician in Michigan
