= Paterson (automobile) =

Defunct American motor vehicle manufacturer

W. A. Paterson Company
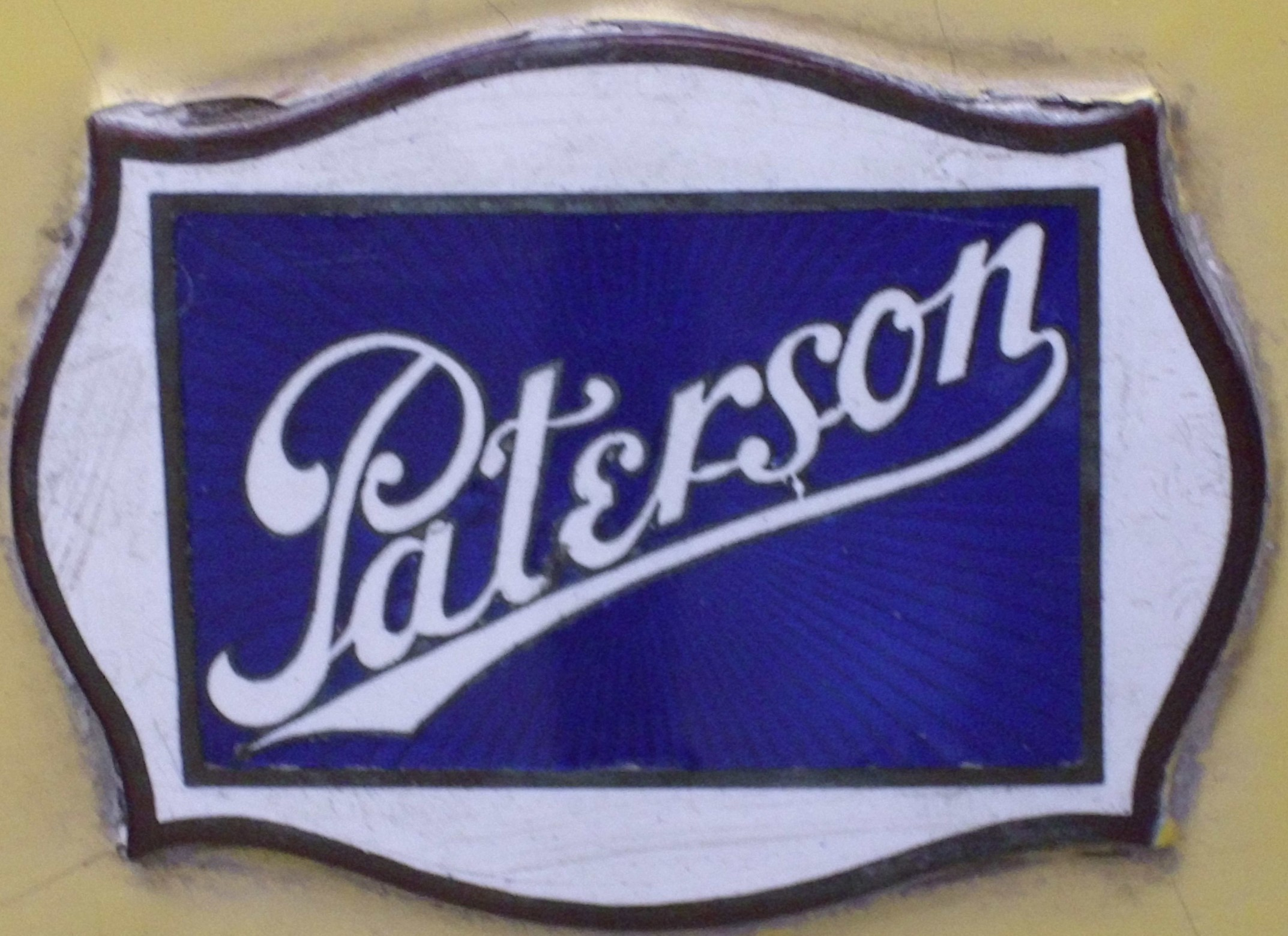
- Paterson Automobile emblem

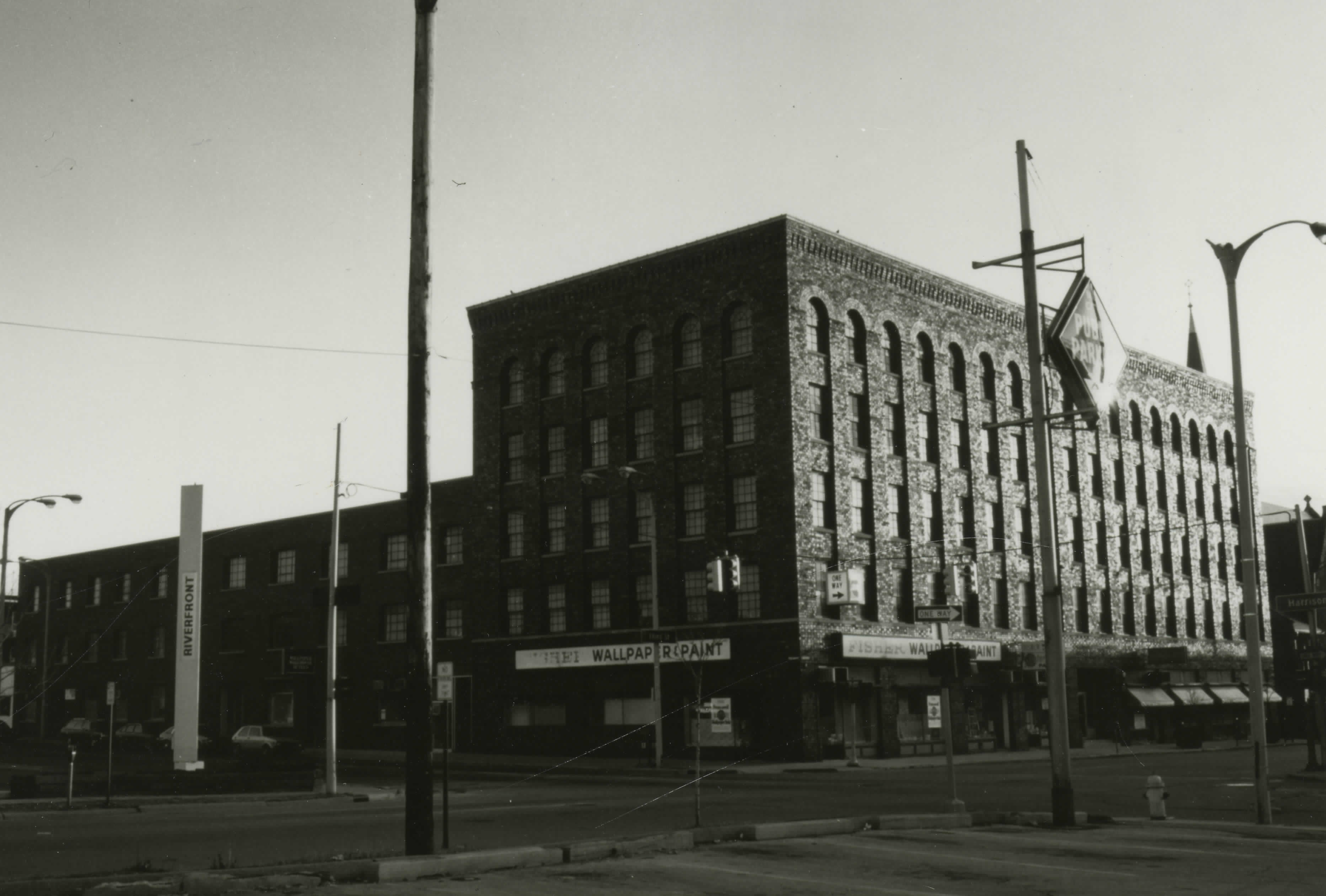
- W. A . Paterson Company factory - NRHP
- Company type: Automobile manufacturer
- Industry: Coachbuilder, Automotive
- Founded: 1869; 157 years ago
- Founder: William A. Paterson
- Defunct: 1923; 103 years ago
- Fate: Sold
- Headquarters: Flint, Michigan, United States
- Key people: William A. Patterson, William C. Patterson, W. R. Hubbard
- Products: Automobiles
- Production output: 12,652 (1909-1923)

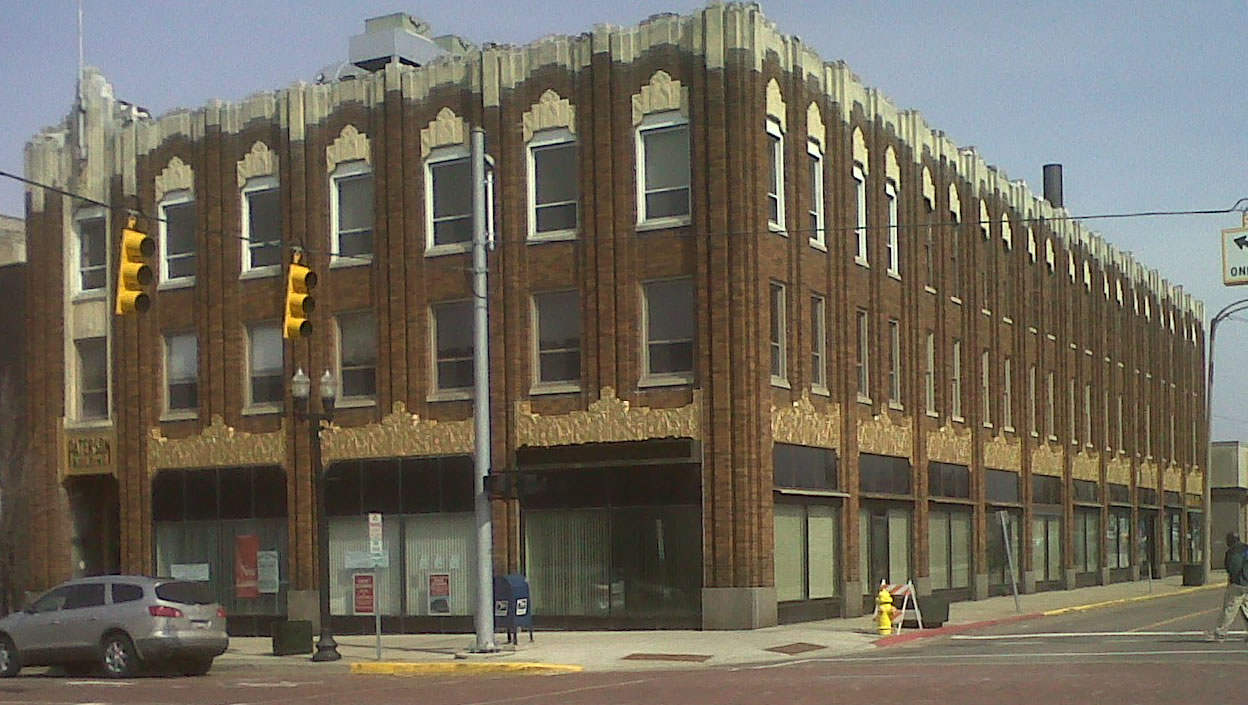
The Paterson Office Building, 653 S. Saginaw St. Flint MI

The Paterson was a Brass Era/Vintage car built in Flint, Michigan from 1909 until 1923.

== History ==
Canadian-born William A. Paterson set up the W. A. Paterson Company in Flint in 1869 to make carriages, and by 1900 he was producing some 30,000 yearly. Even though he entered the automobile field later than many of his fellow carriage makers, he was totally committed to the enterprise, and manufactured a well-built automobile. By 1910, he had completely stopped producing carriages.

The earliest Patersons were typical of motorized buggies at the time, featuring a two-cylinder air-cooled engine, planetary transmission, double chain drive and solid rubber tires. In 1910, the Paterson matured into a more refined automobile, with four-cylinder 30HP engines, shaft drive, and selective transmission. Six-cylinder engines were introduced in 1915, and the four was dropped the following year. For the remainder of its production run, Patersons featured Continental six-cylinder engines.

As with Cole in Indianapolis, Patersons enjoyed a high degree of owner loyalty. There was also a widespread distribution network, with dealers in all 48 states. After William Paterson died in 1921, his son, W. C. Paterson, and associate W. R. Hubbard had trouble running the company during the postwar depression. In July 1923, the two sold the company to Dallas Winslow, who was the Dodge dealer in Flint. Winslow stated he would be hiring the engineering and production manager, E. C. Kollmorgen, to alter the Paterson in order to continue production, but he must have soon changed his mind and the Paterson Company was closed.

The Paterson Office Building still stands in Flint at the corner of Saginaw Street and Third Street. The Paterson Building has been owned by the Collison Family for over 25 years and has been restored inside and out.

== Gallery ==
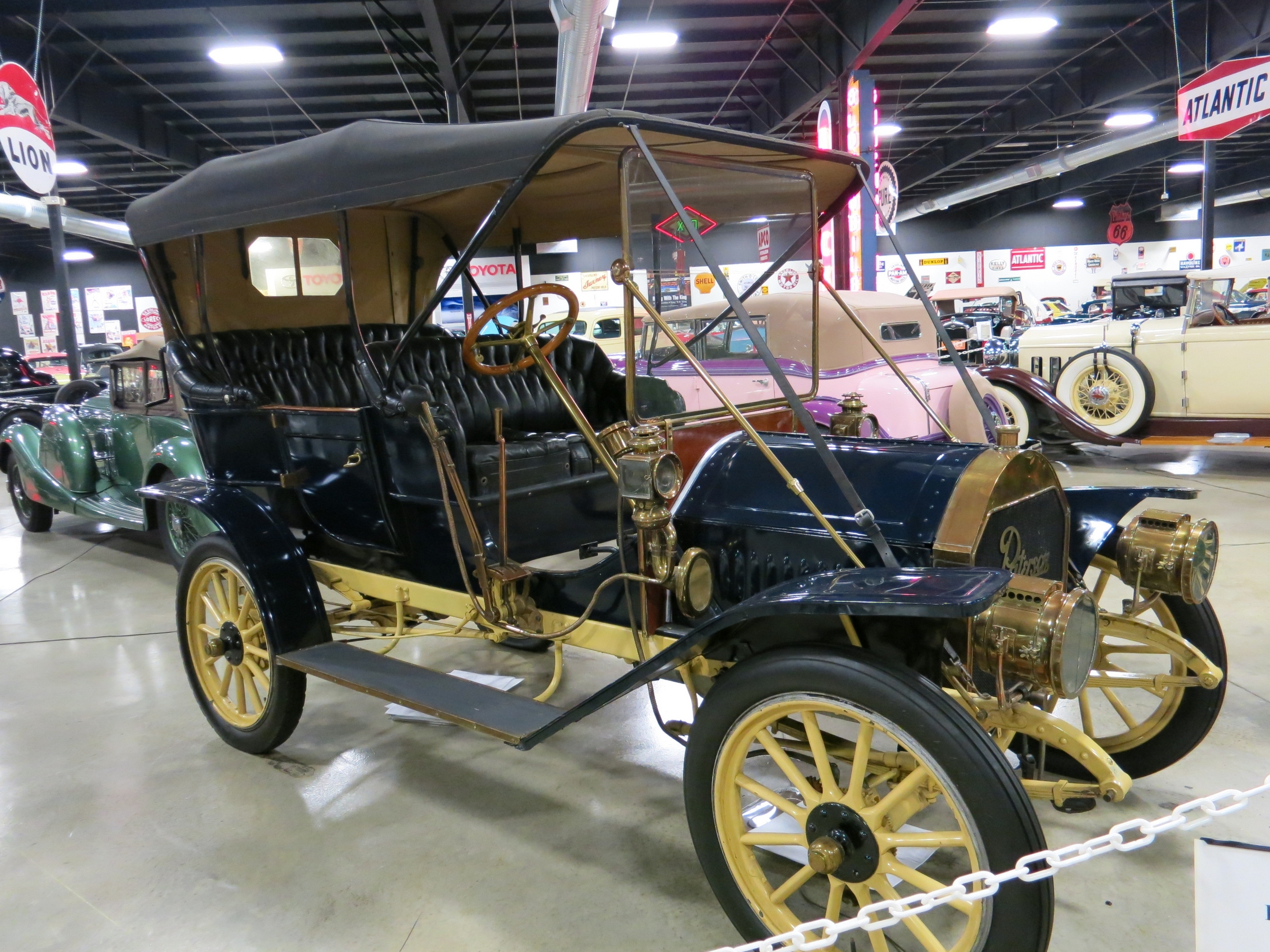
1910 Paterson at the Tupelo Automobile Museum

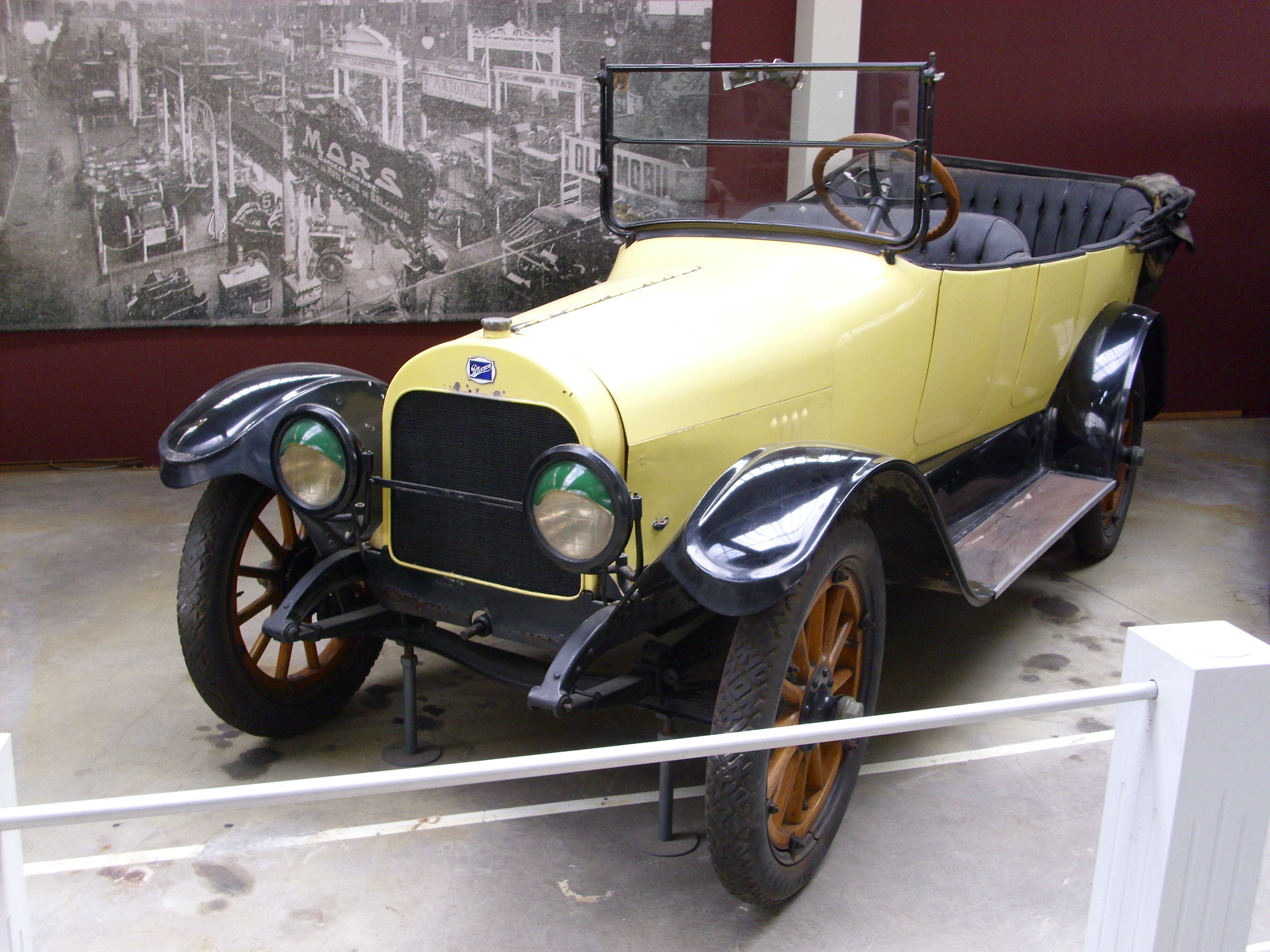
1916 Paterson at Autoworld Brussels

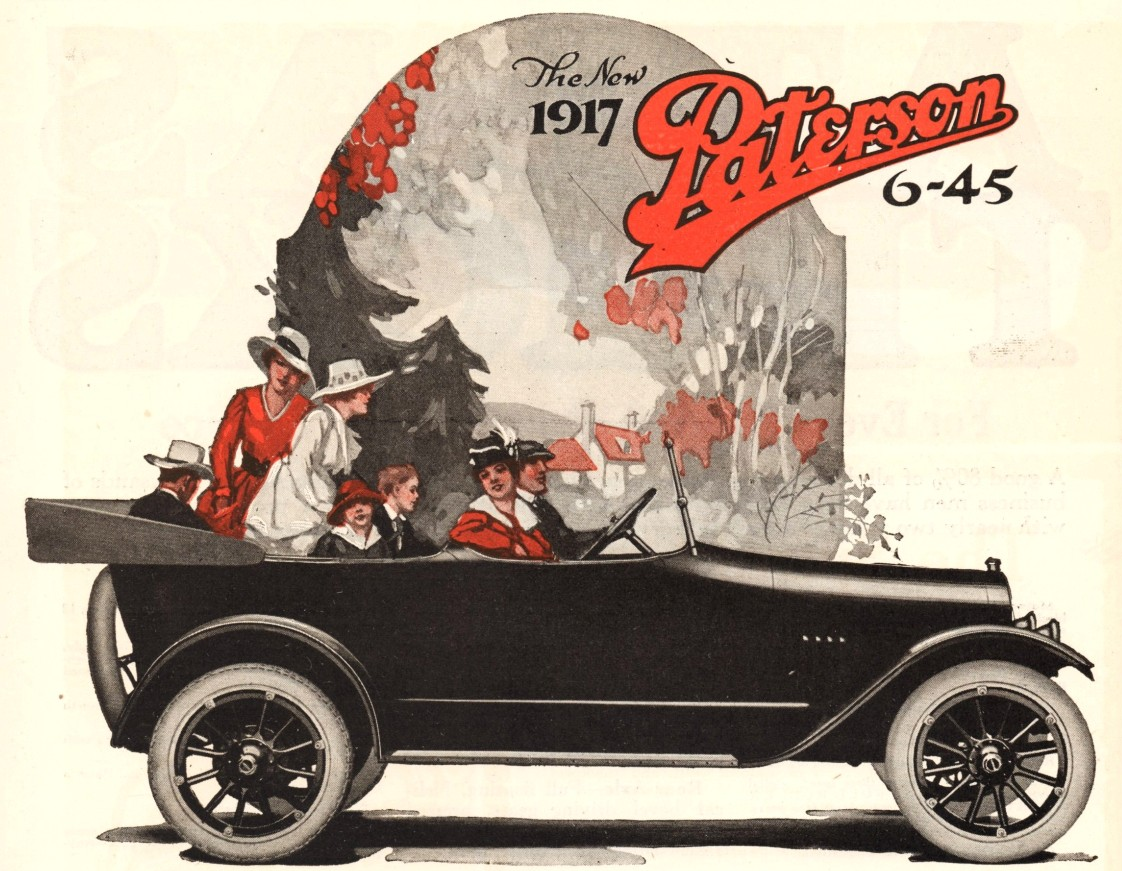
1917 Paterson 6-45 ad detail form Horseless Age

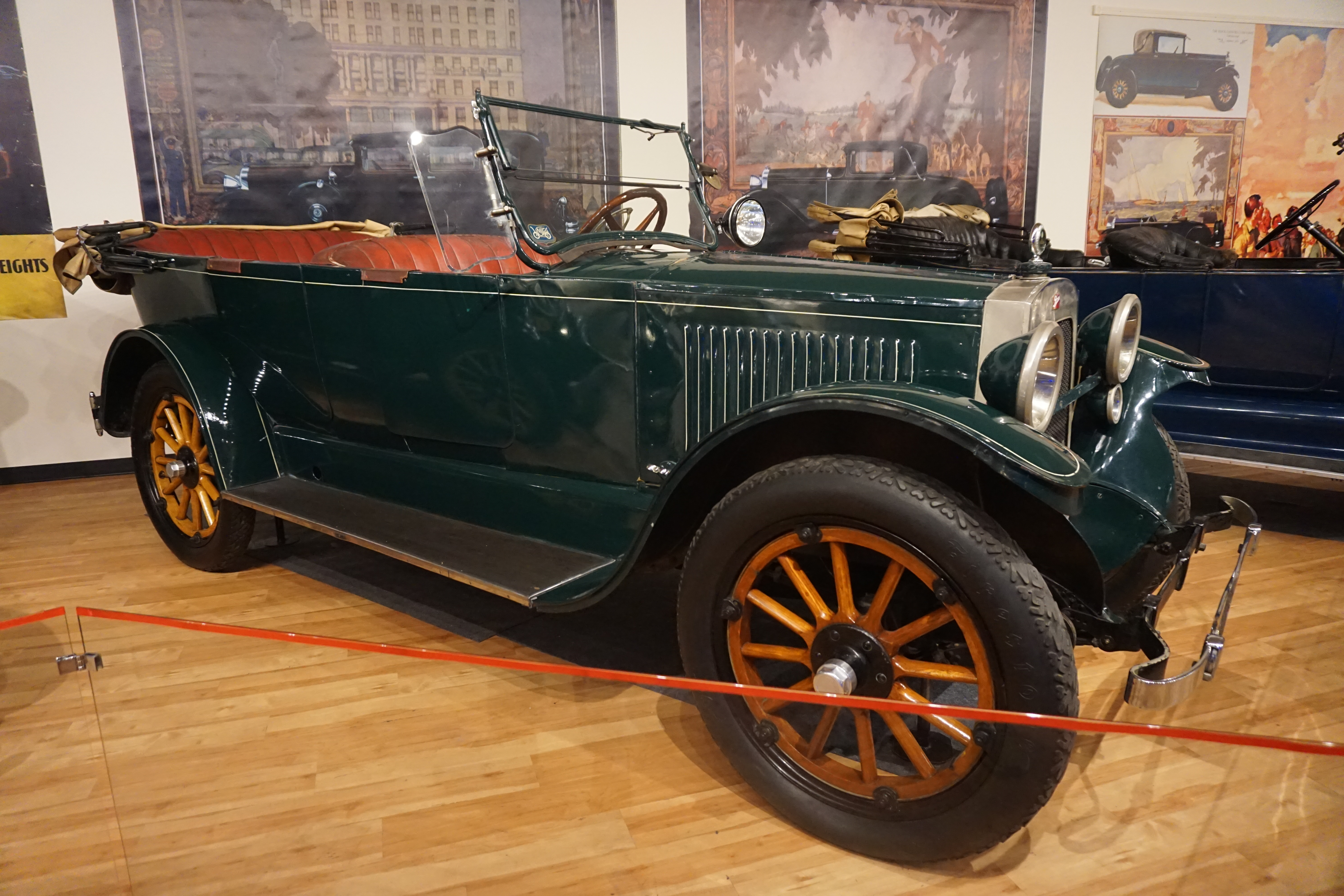
1919 Paterson at the Sloan Museum

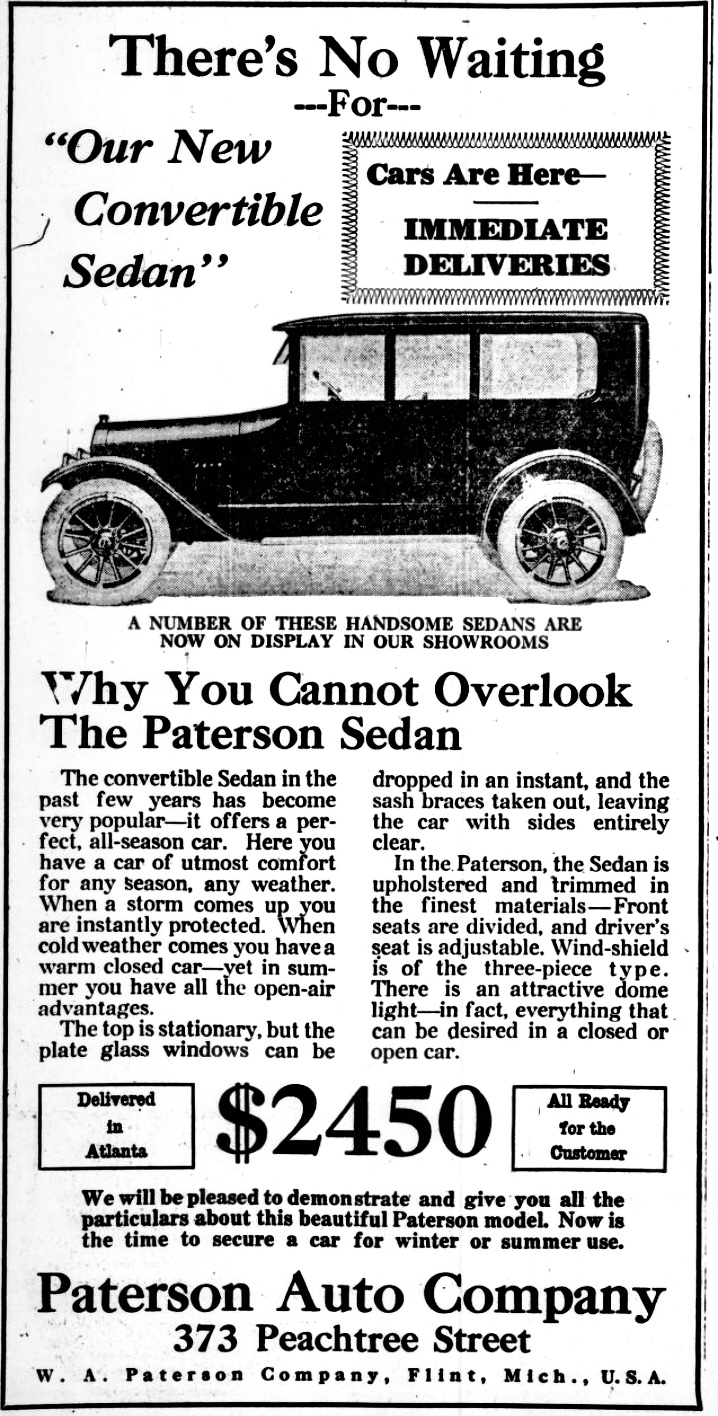
Paterson advertisement (1918)

== See also ==
- William A. Paterson
- The Paterson Building
- William A. Paterson Factory Complex
- 1910 Paterson in Reliability Run - Detroit Public Library
- 1910 Paterson sold at Bonhams
- 1912 Paterson sold at Goodings
