= Austin B. Witherbee =

American politician (1832–1871)

10th Mayor of the City of Flint, Michigan
- In office 1867–1868
- Preceded by: William B. McCreery
- Succeeded by: Samuel M. Axford

Personal details
- Relations: Col. E. H. Thomson, father-in-law
- Occupation: drugist, banker
- Profession: Merchant

Austin Brigham Witherbee (22 May 1832 – 2 February 1871) was an American politician who was the 10th mayor of Flint, Michigan.

== Early life ==
Witherbee was born 22 May 1832 in Marlborough, Massachusetts and moved to the Flint area with his parents in 1841.

== Occupation ==
Witherbee ran a self named drug store downtown and sold it to Charles A. Mason, another mayor of Flint and now the name of a new grocery store set to open in spring 2009 to serve the downtown area at the corner of King Avenue and University Drive, the former old Hats by Jake building.

He opened the first legitimate bank in Flint in 1858 with Mr. Meigs of Boston, Massachusetts and Mr. Stone from Sandy Hill, New Jersey. The Exchange Bank management by Witherbee was a success such that in the spring of 1864, he purchased his partners' shares until the organization of the First National Bank in 1865. In the First National Bank, he became the cashier, with Henry M. Henderson as president, and O. F. Forsyth as vice-president.

== Political life ==
He was elected as the tenth mayor of the City of Flint in 1867 serving a single 1-year term.

Political offices
Preceded by William B. McCreery	Mayor of Flint; 1867-68	Succeeded by Samuel M. Axford

== Death ==
Witherbee died 2 February 1871 in Flint, Michigan.
