= George M. Algoe =

American politician (1898–1968)

77th / 15th City Commission Mayor of the City of Flint, Michigan
- In office 1954–1958
- Preceded by: Donald W. Riegle Sr.
- Succeeded by: Robert J. Egan

City Commissioner of the City of Flint, Michigan

Personal details
- Born: May 26, 1898
- Died: June 4, 1968 (aged 70)
- Profession: Partner in the Algoe-Gundy Co., a funeral home in Flint, Michigan.

George M. Algoe (May 26, 1898 – June 4, 1968) was a Michigan politician.

== Early life ==
Algoe was born on May 26, 1898.

== Political life ==
The Flint City Commission selected him as mayor for the years 1954–1958.

== Post-political life ==
Algoe died in 1968.

Political offices
Preceded by Donald W. Riegle Sr.	Mayor of Flint; 1954–1958	Succeeded by Robert J. Egan
