= Francis E. Limmer =

American politician

84th / 22nd City Commission Mayor of the City of Flint
- In office 1970–1973
- Preceded by: Donald R. Cronin
- Succeeded by: Paul Calvin Visser

Francis E. Limmer is a former mayor of the City of Flint, Michigan, serving 1970–1973.

== Political ==
From 1970 to 1973, Limmer was selected by his fellow City Commissioners as Mayor. Under Limmer, the city agreed to acquire property and transfer those properties plus Wilson Park and parking lot & structures to the University of Michigan for its Flint branch campus to locate down town.

== Post-political ==
Limmer was caught up in financial law violations for registration and anti-fraud regarding promissory notes from GT&T Limited Partnerships from 1987 to 1990. He was ordered on September 13, 1993 to stop violating federal securities acts.

Political offices
Preceded by Donald R. Cronin	Mayor of Flint; 1970–1973	Succeeded by Paul Calvin Visser
