= Paul Calvin Visser =

American politician (1936–2026)

85th / 23rd City Commission Mayor of the City of Flint
- In office 1973–1975
- Preceded by: Francis E. Limmer
- Succeeded by: James W. Rutherford, 1st Strong Mayor? Council President

Personal details
- Born: August 5, 1936 Flint, Michigan, U.S.
- Died: January 8, 2026 (aged 89) Grand Blanc, Michigan
- Party: Republican

Paul Calvin Visser (August 5, 1936 – January 8, 2026) was an American politician who was mayor of the City of Flint, Michigan, serving as the last mayor selected under Flint's 1929 charter.

== Early life and education ==
Visser grew up on the outskirts of Flint, Michigan, with nine brothers and two sisters. He attended Wentworth and Tanner elementary schools and Kearsley High School, graduating in 1954. His home while growing up was on a small farm, a portion of which has become the Kearsley High School athletic field. Paul was an apprentice and then a journeyman electrician from 1954 to 1966, and served as an assistant to U.S. Congressman Donald Riegle from 1966 to 1971.

Visser joined The Massachusetts Mutual Life Ins. Co. as an agent in 1971. Earned Chartered Life Underwriter designation (CLU), Chartered Financial Consultant (CHFC) and Master of Science in financial services from the American College in Bryn Mawr, PA. He received numerous insurance industry awards, including Flint Agent of the Year 13 times and Million Dollar Round Table achievement for 25 years. Paul served as the president of the 5000-member Mass Mutual National Agents Association in the late 1980s.

Community activities included positions with United Way, Goodwill Industries, Salvation Army and as president of the Flint Rotary Club. Visser was the founding Chairman of the Flint Cultural Center Corporation and played an important role in its early success. In 1998, Visser was named the C.S. Mott Citizen of the Year by the Flint Area Chamber of Commerce in recognition of his leadership in bringing about the successful reorganization of the Flint Cultural Center. In 2022, Visser was inducted into the Kearsley High School Hall of Fame in recognition of his accomplishments in life after high school.

== Political career ==
In 1966 Visser ran unsuccessfully for Michigan State House of Representatives 82nd District. He served on the Flint Civil Service Commission in 1972 and 1973. In 1973 he was elected to the Flint City Commission and was selected by his fellow City Commissioners as Mayor. His term expired in 1975.

== Personal life and death ==
In 2017 Visser and his wife, Margaret, returned to his roots in the Flint area after 20 years in Charlevoix and Traverse City, Michigan. They later resided in Grand Blanc, and Ocala, Florida in the winter.

Visser and his wife were born-again Christians. They attended Timber Ridge Community Church in Dunnellon, Florida, and at Tyrone Covenant Presbyterian Church in Fenton, Michigan.

Visser died on January 8, 2026, at the age of 89.

Political offices
Preceded by Francis E. Limmer	Mayor of Flint; 1973–1975	Succeeded by (James W. Rutherford) (1st Strong Mayor)
