= George E. Newell =

American politician

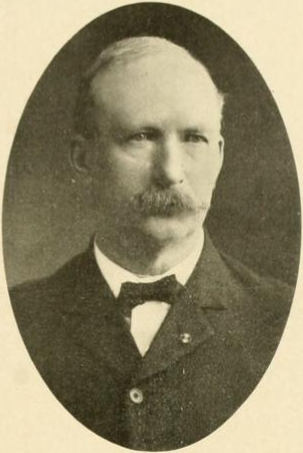

24th Mayor of the City of Flint, Michigan
- In office 1883–1884
- Preceded by: William A. Atwood
- Succeeded by: William W. Joyner

Personal details
- Born: September 18, 1842 Flushing, Genesee County
- Died: September 10, 1916
- Spouse: Sarah H. Freeman
- Children: two sons

George Edward Newell (last name possibly Newall) was a Michigan politician. He was a member of the Masons, the Grand Army of the Republic and a Knight of the Maccabbes.

== Early life ==
Newall was born to Thomas and Sarah (Bowden) Newall on September 18, 1842, in Flushing, Genesee County. His family move to Flint while he was young. At age fourteen, he left school to work in a planing mill. He served in the Civil War as a Lieutenant of Company A, Eighth Michigan Infantry from June 19, 1861, to September 10, 1862. He was a captain until March 9, 1863. In 1863, he married Sarah H. Freeman, with whom he had two sons.

== Political life ==
Newell entered public service as Flint's Postmaster and held the position of School Director and city supervisor of Flint's First Ward. He was elected as the Mayor of the City of Flint in 1883 serving a 1-year term.

== Post-Political life ==
Newall died on September 10, 1916.

Political offices
Preceded by William A. Atwood	Mayor of Flint; 1883-84	Succeeded by William W. Joyner
