= List of mayors of Flint, Michigan =

The mayor position of Flint, Michigan is a strong mayor-type. In Flint's previous 1929 charter, the mayor was one of the City Commissioners, as the council in a council-manager type government.

== 1855–1888 ==
The mayor was one of many citywide elected officers including the Recorder, Supervisor, Treasurer, Marshal, Directors of the Poor, School Inspector and Justices of the Peace. Additionally, other administrative officers were selected by wards.

Mayor	Start of Term	End of Term	Notes
Grant Decker	1855	1856	
Robert J. S. Page	1856	1857	
Henry M. Henderson	1857	1858	
William M. Fenton	1858	1860	Some records show Porter Hazelton as mayor from 1859 to 1860
Henry H. Crapo	1860	1861	
Ephraim S. Williams	1861	1862	
William Paterson	1862	1863	
William Hamilton	1863	1865	
William B. McCreery	1865	1867	
Austin B. Witherbee	1867	1868	
Samuel M. Axford	1868	1869	
William S. Patrick	1869	1870	
James B. Walker	1870	1871	
David Spencer Fox	1871	1873	
George H. Durand	1873	1875	
Alexander McFarland	1875	1876	
William Hamilton	1876	1877	
Edward Hughes Thomson	1877	1878	
Jerome Eddy	1878	1879	
James C. Willson	1879	1880	
Zacheus Chase	1880	1881	
Charles A. Mason	1881	1882	
William A. Atwood	1882	1883	
George E. Newall	1883	1884	
William W. Joyner	1884	1885	
Mathew Davison	1885	1886	
George T. Warren	1886	1887	
John C. Dayton	1887	1888	

== 1888 Charter ==
Mayor	Start of Term	End of Term	Notes
Oren Stone	1888	1889	
Frank D. Baker	1889	1890	
William A. Paterson	1890	1891	
Francis H. Rankin Jr.	1891	1892	
George E. Taylor	1892	1893	
Andrew J. Ward	1893	1894	
Arthur C. McCall	1894	1894	
John C. Zimmerman Sr.	1895	1896	
Samuel C. Randall	1896	1897	
Milton C. Pettibone	1897	1898	
George R. Gold	1898	1899	
Hugh Alexander Crawford	1899	1900	
Charles A. Cummings	1900	1901	
Clark B. Dibble	1901	1902	
Austin D. Alvord	1902	1904	
Bruce J. McDonald	1904	1905	
David D. Aitken	1905	1906	
George E. McKinley	1906	1908	
Horace C. Spencer	1908	1909	
Guy W. Selby	1909	1911	
John A. C. Menton	1911	1912	
Charles Stewart Mott	1912	1914	
John R. MacDonald	1914	1915	
William H. McKeighan	1915	1916	
Earl F. Johnson	1916	1917	
George C. Kellar	1917	1918	
Charles Stewart Mott	1918	1919	
George C. Kellar	1919	1920	
Edwin W. Atwood	1920	1922	
William H. McKeighan	1922	1923	
David R. Cuthbertson	1923	1924	
Judson L. Transue	1924	1927	
William H. McKeighan	1927	1928	
Ray A. Brownell	1929	1930	

Key to party colors and abbreviations for members of the U.S. Congress and other politicians or officials
Alaskan Independence (AKIP) Know Nothing (KN) American Labor (AL) Anti-Jacksonian (Anti-J); National Republican (NR) Anti-Administration (AA) Anti-Masonic (Anti-M) Conservative (Con) Covenant (Cov)	Democratic (D) Democratic–Farmer–Labor (DFL) Democratic–NPL (D-NPL) Dixiecrat (Dix), States' Rights (SR) Democratic-Republican (DR) Farmer–Labor (FL) Federalist (F); Pro-Administration (PA)	Free Soil (FS) Fusion (Fus) Greenback (GB) Independence (IPM) Independent Democrat (ID) Independent Republican (IR) Jacksonian (J) Liberal (Lib)	Libertarian (L) National Union (NU) Nonpartisan League (NPL) Nullifier (N) Opposition Northern (O); Opposition Southern (O) Populist (Pop) Progressive (Prog)	Prohibition (Proh) Readjuster (Rea) Republican (R) Silver (Sv) Silver Republican (SvR) Socialist (Soc) Union (U) Unconditional Union (UU)	Vermont Progressive (VP) Whig (W) Independent (I) Nonpartisan (NP)

== 1929 Charter ==
Under the 1929 charter, Flint move to a council–manager form of government with the council called the “City Commission.”

Mayor	Start of Term	End of Term	Notes
Harvey J. Mallery	1930	1931	
William H. McKeighan	1931	1933	
Ray A. Brownell	1933	1934	
Howard J. Clifford	1934	1935	
George E. Boysen	1935	1936	
Harold E. Bradshaw	1936	1938	
Harry M. Comins	1938	1940	
Oliver Tappin	1940	1940	
William Osmund Kelly	1940	1944	
Edwin C. McLogan	1944	1946	
Edward J. Viall	1946	1948	
George G. Wills	1948	1950	
Paul Lovegrove	1950	1952	
Donald W. Riegle Sr.	1952	1954	
George M. Algoe	1954	1958	
Robert J. Egan	1958	1960	
Charles A. Mobley	1960	1962	
George R. Poulos	1962	1964	
Harry K. Cull	1964	1966	
Floyd J. McCree	1966	1968	First African-American mayor
Donald R. Cronin	1968	1970	
Francis E. Limmer(C. Stanley Mills)	1970	1973	
Paul Calvin Visser	1973	1975	

== 1974 Charter ==
Under the 1974 Charter, the office of mayor is a non-partisan elected position.

Mayor	Start of Term	End of Term	Administrator	Notes	Elections
James W. Rutherford	1975	1983			Year / Votes / opponent / opponent's votes; 1975 / 20,679 / Floyd J. McCree / 20,474; 1979 / 20,738 / Floyd J. McCree / 12,902
James A. Sharp Jr.	1983	1987		First elected African-American mayor 2nd African-American mayor	1983 / 21,718 / James W. Rutherford / 20,467
Matthew S. Collier	1987	1991			1987 / 22,874 / James A. Sharp Jr. / 19,509
Woodrow Stanley	1991	March 5, 2002	? (1991–2001); Darnell Earley (2001–2002)	3rd African-American mayor Recalled from office in third term	1991 / 25,946 / Matt Collier / 17,686; 1995 / 21,687 / Don Williamson / 9,168; 1999 / 17,224 / Scott Kincaid / 16,393; 2002 / 12,336 / Recall / 15,863
Darnell Earley	March 5, 2002	August 6, 2002	himself	Temporary Mayor per City Charter; Effectively City Administrator as of July 9, 2002, due to State appointment of Emergency Financial Manager, Ed Kurtz	
James W. Rutherford	August 6, 2002	2003	Darnell Earley	elected to fill remainder of Stanley term; City still under State Financial Manager	2002 / 11,239 / Arthur J. Pointer (WI) / 4,712
Don Williamson	2003	February 15, 2009	Peggy R. Cook (2003–2007); Darryl Buchanan (2007–2009); Michael Brown (2009)	Initially under Emergency Financial Manager lifted in 2004. facing recall; resigns	2003 / 13,906 / Floyd Clack / 9,228; 2007 / 12,434 / Dayne Walling / 11,853
Michael Brown	February 16, 2009	August 5, 2009	himself	Temporary Mayor per City Charter	
Dayne Walling	August 5, 2009	November 9, 2015	Gregory Eason (August 14, 2009- December 2, 2011); Michael Brown (8/7/2012- July 2013); Natasha Henderson	Powers remove effective January 12, 2011, under city's financial emergency & transfer to an Emergency Manager of which several individuals served until April 30, 2015, when a Receivership Board assume some oversight.	2009 / 12,266 / Brenda Clack / 6,876; 2011 / 8,819 (56%) / Darryl Buchanan / 6,868 votes (44%)
Karen Weaver	November 9, 2015	November 11, 2019	Natasha Henderson; Sylvester Jones; Steve Branch (Chief of Staff, interim)	under RTA Board oversight First female mayor of Flint.	2015 / 7,825 (55%) / Dayne Walling / 6,061 (43%)
Sheldon Neeley	November 11, 2019	present	Clyde Edwards		2019 / 7,082 (50.19%) / Karen Weaver / 6,877 (48.74%)
