= George T. Warren =

American politician

27th Mayor of the City of Flint, Michigan
- In office 1886–1887
- Preceded by: Mathew Davison
- Succeeded by: John C. Dayton

Personal details
- Born: c. 1842 Ohio, U.S.

George T. Warren (born c. 1842, date of death unknown) was a Michigan politician.

== Political life ==
He was elected as the Mayor of the City of Flint in 1886 for a single 1-year term.

== Post-political life ==
Warren moved out the city by 1916.

Political offices
Preceded by Mathew Davison	Mayor of Flint; 1886-87	Succeeded by John C. Dayton
