= Fenton R. McCreery =

American diplomat

Fenton Reuben McCreery (April 21, 1866 Flint, Michigan–October 6, 1940) was the American Minister Resident/Consul General to the Dominican Republic (1907 until 1909) and Envoy Extraordinary and Minister Plenipotentiary to Honduras (1909 until 1911). He was also Chargé d'affaires in Chile from 1892 until 1893.

McCreery was the son of William B. McCreery and Ada Birdsall Fenton. He attended the Michigan Military Academy and graduated the University of Michigan in 1888. he is buried at Glenwood Cemetery (Flint, Michigan).
