= Arthur C. McCall =

American politician

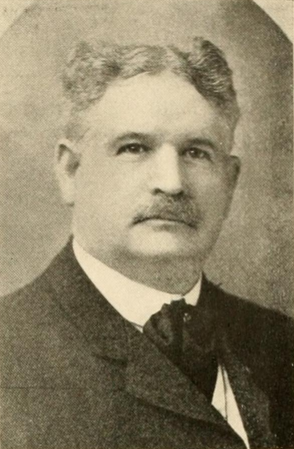

Sheriff
- In office 1884–1888
- Constituency: Genesee County

35th Mayor of the City of Flint, Michigan
- In office 1894–1895
- Preceded by: Andrew J. Ward
- Succeeded by: John C. Zimmerman Sr.

Alderman
- In office 1888–1890?
- Constituency: City of Flint ? Ward

Constable
- In office 1878–1879?
- Constituency: Grand Blanc

Personal details
- Born: July 5, 1852 Camillis, Onondaga County, New York
- Died: March 16, 1916 (aged 63)
- Resting place: Evergreen Cemetery, Grand Blanc
- Spouse: Harriet L. Tupper
- Children: Donald
- Occupation: harness, clothing, law enforcement
- Profession: harness

Arthur C. McCall (July 5, 1852 – March 16, 1916) was a Michigan politician. He was a thirty-second degree Mason and was Eminent Commander of the Knights Templar.

== Early life ==
In Camillis, Onondaga County, New York, McCall was born on July 5, 1852. At age 15, he moved with his family to Grand Blanc. He apprenticed in his father's Grand Blanc harness shop and later took it over.

== Political life ==
In 1878, McCall was elected Constable of Grand Blanc. He became a deputy county sheriff and turnkey in 1881. With three days remaining, he entered the race for Genesee County Sheriff and won in 1884 and served four years in that office. Thereafter, he joined the Pettibone and McCall clothing firm of Flint while serving two terms as alderman. He was elected as the Mayor of the City of Flint in 1894 for a single 1-year term. In 1896 he ran again for Sheriff and was elected, and re-elected in 1898, serving for four years. In 1901, he was appointed as deputy internal revenue collector serving two terms.

== Post-political life ==
Moving to Jacksonville, Illinois, he ran the Dunlap Hotel. After his return to Flint, he sold real estate and life insurance. On March 16, 1916, McCall died and was interred in Evergreen Cemetery, Grand Blanc.

Political offices
Preceded by Andrew J. Ward	Mayor of Flint; 1894–95	Succeeded by John C. Zimmerman Sr.
