= Robert J. Egan (Michigan politician) =

American politician

78th / 16th City Commission Mayor of the City of Flint, Michigan
- In office 1958–1960
- Preceded by: George M. Algoe
- Succeeded by: Charles A. Mobley

City Commissioner of the City of Flint, Michigan

Robert J. Egan was a Michigan politician.

== Political life ==
The Flint City Commission selected him as mayor for the years 1958-60.

Political offices
Preceded by George M. Algoe	Mayor of Flint; 1958–1960	Succeeded by Charles A. Mobley
