= William A. Paterson =

American politician

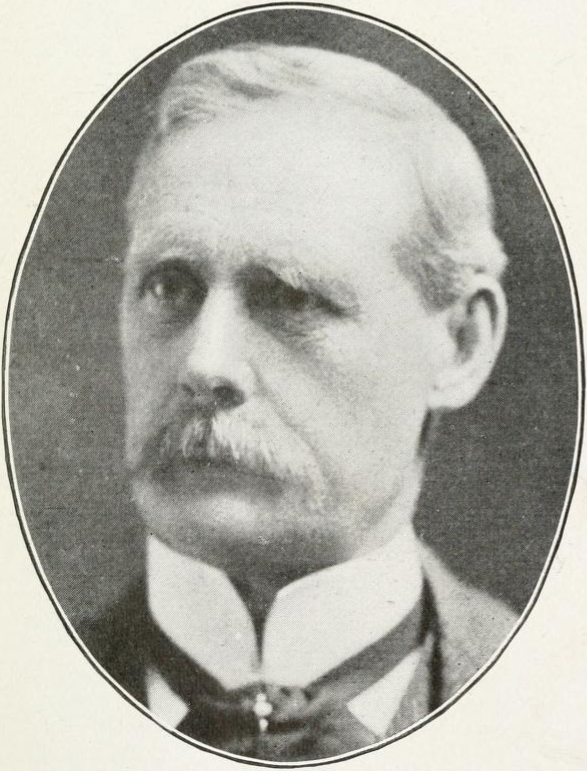

31st Mayor of the City of Flint, Michigan
- In office 1890–1891
- Preceded by: Frank D. Baker
- Succeeded by: Francis H. Rankin Jr.

Personal details
- Born: October 3, 1838 Fergus, Ontario
- Died: September 8, 1921 (aged 82) Flint, Michigan
- Resting place: Glenwood Cemetery, Flint, Michigan

William A. Paterson (October 3, 1838 – September 8, 1921) was born in Canada in 1838 and arrived in Flint, Michigan in 1868. He established the W. A. Paterson Company, a carriage-manufacturer. One of the original stockholders of Buick Motor Company, he entered the automobile business for himself and marketed the Paterson automobile (1908 to 1923).

From 1891 to 1892 he served as mayor of the City of Flint. He was also involved in founding the Union Trust Savings Bank.

Paterson constructed a new office on the corner of S. Saginaw and Third Streets. The art deco Patterson Building still stands today. It is now owned by Communities First, Inc.

== See also ==
- William A. Paterson Factory Complex

Political offices
Preceded by Frank D. Baker	Mayor of Flint; 1890–1891	Succeeded by Francis H. Rankin Jr.
