= Thomas J. Cox =

American politician and hotel owner

Thomas J. Cox (October 1, 1876 – November 23, 1930) was an American politician and hotel owner from New York.

== Life ==
Cox was born on October 1, 1876, in Brooklyn, New York. He attended St. Paul's Parochial School. He began working as a locker attendant in the Parkway Baths on Ocean Parkway. He eventually became proprietor of Cox's Hotel and Baths at Henderson's Walk on Coney Island.

In 1918, Cox was elected to the New York State Assembly as a Democrat, representing the Kings County 2nd District. He served in the Assembly in 1919. In 1921, he was elected to the New York City Board of Aldermen. He served as alderman for the next eight years. In January 1930, he was appointed Deputy Commissioner of Hospitals.

Cox was married to Katherine Gibbons. He was a member of the Coney Island Board of Trade, the Madison Club, the Union Club, the Knights of the Maccabees, and the Elks.

Cox died at home from heart disease on November 23, 1930. He was buried in Holy Cross Cemetery.

New York State Assembly
Preceded by William H. Fitzgerald	New York State Assembly; Kings County, 2nd District; 1919	Succeeded by James J. Mullen
