= Milton C. Pettibone =

American politician (1843–1916)

38th Mayor of the City of Flint, Michigan
- In office 1897–1898
- Preceded by: Samuel C. Randall
- Succeeded by: George R. Gold

Personal details
- Born: February 7, 1843 Howell, Michigan
- Died: August 11, 1916 (aged 73) Flint, Michigan
- Party: Republican
- Spouse: Elsie C. Rider
- Relations: Letitia Terhune & Roswell Pettibone, parents John Pettibone, grandfather Joseph Rider, father-in-law
- Children: Bertie, Charles L. and Max M.
- Occupation: clothing
- Profession: merchant

Milton Chauncey Pettibone (February 7, 1843 – August 11, 1916) was a Michigan politician. He was a member of the Free and Accepted Masons, the Royal Arch Masons, Knights of the Maccabees, and the Royal Arcanum. Additional he was a Past Eminent commander of the Genesee Valley Commandry, No. 15, K. T.

== Early life ==
Pettibone was born in Howell on February 7, 1843. He advanced his education such that he was qualified to teach. He clerked in the Jewett & Crossman dry goods store for two years. In 1867, he came to Flint and clerked for Judd, NcCreary & Avery. Pettibone joined that partnership after five years becoming the firm F. W. Judd & Co. After four successfully years, the partnership dissolved and Pettibone then clerked at Smith, Bridgeman & Co. for two years. He started the firm named Lewis & Pettibone in 1878 in the clothing business. Eleven years later, he sold out his share of the business to start another clothing firm. With A. C. McCall, Pettibone formed the firm, Pettibone & McCall.

== Political life ==
He was elected as the Mayor of City of Flint in 1897 for a single one-year term.

Political offices
Preceded by Samuel C. Randall	Mayor of Flint; 1897-98	Succeeded by George R. Gold
