= George R. Poulos =

American politician

80th / 18th City Commission Mayor of the City of Flint, Michigan
- In office 1962–1964
- Deputy: Daniel R. Seal (pro tem)
- Preceded by: Charles A. Mobley
- Succeeded by: Harry K. Cull

City Commissioner of the City of Flint, Michigan
- Constituency: 8th Ward

Personal details
- Born: December 11, 1926 Flint, Michigan
- Died: September 28, 2014 (aged 87)
- Spouse: Yvonne (Frechette) Poulos
- Children: Dianne Poulos, Bradley Poulos

George R. Poulos (December 11, 1926 – September 28, 2014) was a Michigan politician.

== Biography ==
Poulos was born in 1926 and lived in Flint until the day he died. He worked for Mobil Fuel Oil Home Delivery and later at the Bell/Ameritech Yellow Pages. He had one daughter and one son.

He was elected to The Flint City Commission in 1960 and later selected as mayor for the years 1962–1964. he also served on the Genesee County Board of Supervisors from 1964 to 1968.

Since 1989, he has volunteered at Bay Cliff Health Camp, a year-round, nonprofit therapy and wellness center for persons with physical disabilities located in Big Bay Michigan. He died September 28, 2014.

Political offices
Preceded by Charles A. Mobley	Mayor of Flint; 1962–1964	Succeeded by Harry K. Cull
