= John C. Dayton =

American politician

28th Mayor of the City of Flint, Michigan
- Preceded by: George T. Warren
- Succeeded by: Oren Stone

Trustee
- Constituency: Village of St. Johns

Personal details
- Born: October 28, 1837 Grand Blanc
- Died: August 19, 1895 (aged 57) Michigan
- Party: Republican
- Spouse: Jenny E. Wolverton
- Relations: Jonathan and Maria (Upham) Dayton, parents Daniel Dayton & Joseph Upham, grandfathers Dennis Wolverton, father-in-law
- Occupation: farmer, food manufacturer, hotelier

John C. Dayton (October 28, 1837 – August 19, 1895) was a Michigan politician.

== Early life ==
Dayton lived with his family on a farm in Grand Blanc Township after he was born on October 28, 1837. At age 22, he worked a sharecropper farm. Jenny E. Wolverton of Saratoga County, N. Y. married Dayton on October 20, 1859, in Grand Blanc. Moving to St. Johns in 1865, he joined J. M. Frisbie in the manufacture of crackers. He purchased his partner's share three years later. After selling his business in 1872, he moved to Flint. He was a dealer in horses until October 1880. At that time, he purchased the Brotherton House, a hotel, and renamed it Dayton House.

== Political life ==
While in St. Johns, he served two terms as Village Trustee. He was elected as the Mayor of the City of Flint in 1887 for a single 1-year term.

== Post-political life ==
Political offices
Preceded by George T. Warren	Mayor of Flint; 1887-88	Succeeded by Oren Stone
