= Harry M. Comins =

American politician (1882–1962)

69th / 7th City Commission Mayor of the City of Flint, Michigan
- In office 1938–1940
- Preceded by: Harold E. Bradshaw
- Succeeded by: Oliver Tappin

City Commissioner of the City of Flint, Michigan

Personal details
- Born: January 24, 1882 Saginaw, Michigan
- Died: April 15, 1962 (aged 80) Flint, Michigan

Harry Mason Comins (January 24, 1882 – April 15, 1962) was a Michigan politician.

== Political life ==
The Flint City Commission select him as mayor in 1938 for two one-year terms.

Political offices
Preceded by Harold E. Bradshaw	Mayor of Flint; 1938–1940	Succeeded by Oliver Tappin
