= Donald W. Riegle Sr. =

American politician (1917–1992)

76th / 14th City Commission Mayor of the City of Flint, Michigan
- In office 1952–1954
- Preceded by: Paul Lovegrove
- Succeeded by: George M. Algoe

City Commissioner of the City of Flint, Michigan

Personal details
- Born: Donald Wayne Riegle; June 23, 1917 Michigan, U.S.
- Died: March 13, 1992 (aged 74) Flint, Michigan
- Children: Donald W. Riegle Jr.

Donald Wayne Riegle Sr. (June 23, 1917 – March 13, 1992) was a Michigan politician.

== Political life ==
The Flint City Commission selected him as mayor in 1952 and then selected him again for another year. His son Donald W. Riegle Jr. served in Congress, representing the 7th district from 1967 to 1976, and served as United States Senator from Michigan from 1976 to 1995.

Political offices
| Preceded by Paul Lovegrove | Mayor of Flint; 1952–1954 | Succeeded by George M. Algoe |
