= George G. Wills =

American politician (1903–1983)

74th / 12th City Commission Mayor of the City of Flint, Michigan
- In office 1948–1950
- Preceded by: Edward J. Viall
- Succeeded by: Paul Lovegrove

City Commissioner of the City of Flint, Michigan

Personal details
- Born: June 18, 1903 Houghton, Michigan
- Died: April 6, 1983 (aged 79) Flint, Michigan
- Party: Republican

George Gill Wills (June 18, 1903 – April 6, 1983) was a Michigan politician.

== Political life ==
The Flint City Commission selected Wills as mayor in 1948 and then selected him again for another year. In 1961, Wills was a primary election candidate for Michigan state constitutional convention delegate, Genesee County 2nd District.

Political offices
Preceded by Edward J. Viall	Mayor of Flint; 1948–1950	Succeeded by Paul Lovegrove
