= Grant Decker =

American politician (1814–1890)

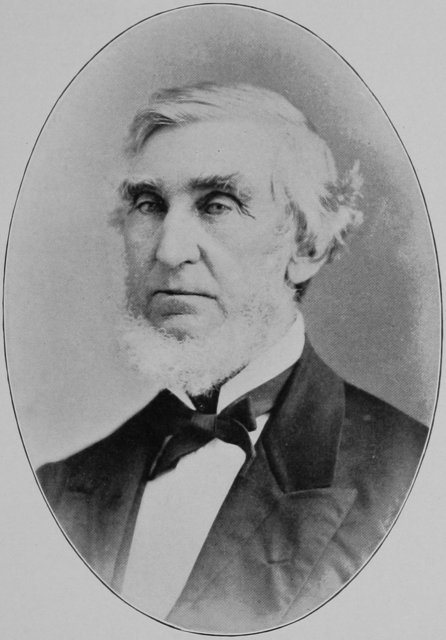

1st Mayor of the City of Flint
- In office 1855–1856
- Preceded by: Office established
- Succeeded by: Robert J. S. Page

Personal details
- Born: February 4, 1814 Deckertown, Sussex County, New Jersey
- Died: July 30, 1890 (aged 76) Flint, Genesee County, Michigan

Grant Decker (February 4, 1814 – July 30, 1890) was the first mayor of the village (now City) of Flint, Michigan serving from 1855 to 1856. He was a merchant, miller and in the lumber businesses at some time in his life.

== Early life ==
Decker was born in Deckertown, Sussex County, New Jersey on February 4, 1814. He came to Flint, Michigan, in 1839 to work in the lumbering industry. With the Honorable Artemas Thayer, he built a flour mill. Later in association with Captain Ira H. Wilder, he owned interests in a flour and feed mill. Over his time in Flint, eight fires hit his various businesses.

== Political ==
In 1855 Decker was elected Mayor of the Village of Flint serving until 1856.

== Post-Political ==
On July 30, 1890, Decker died in Flint with interment in Glenwood Cemetery, Flint.

Political offices
Preceded by none	Mayor of Flint; 1855-1856	Succeeded by Robert J. S. Page
