= Hugh Alexander Crawford =

American politician

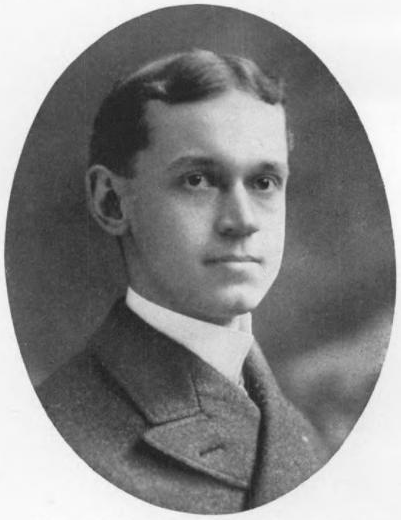

40th Mayor of the City of Flint, Michigan
- In office 1899–1900
- Preceded by: George R. Gold
- Succeeded by: Charles A. Cummings

Personal details
- Born: March 29, 1873 Otisville, Michigan, U.S.
- Died: February 2, 1951 (aged 77) Flint, Michigan, U.S.
- Party: Democratic

Hugh Alexander Crawford, also referred to as H. Alexander Crawford, or H. Alex Crawford, (March 29, 1873 – February 2, 1951) was a Michigan politician.

== Political life ==
Hugh Alexander Crawford was born in Otisville, Michigan on March 29, 1873. He was elected as the Mayor of the City of Flint in 1899 for a single one-year term. He was a candidate in 1900 for Michigan Presidential Elector.

== Post-political life ==
Crawford moved out of the city by 1916. He died in Flint on February 2, 1951.

Political offices
Preceded by George R. Gold	Mayor of Flint; 1899–1900	Succeeded by Charles A. Cummings
