= Samuel M. Axford =

American politician

11th Mayor of the City of Flint, Michigan
- In office 1868–1869
- Preceded by: Austin B. Witherbee
- Succeeded by: William S. Patrick

Personal details
- Died: 1873
- Education: University of Michigan
- Occupation: Medical doctor

Samuel M. Axford (died 1873) was an American politician and medical doctor who was the 11th mayor of Flint, Michigan.

== Early life ==
Axford lived in his youth in Oakland County. He attended the University of Michigan for medical education. In 1858, he moved from Detroit to Flint. He built Axford House as a joint residence and hospital.

== Political life ==
He was elected as the eleventh mayor of the Village of Flint in 1868 serving a single 1-year term.

Axford died in 1873.

Political offices
Preceded by Austin B. Witherbee	Mayor of Flint; 1868-1869	Succeeded by William S. Patrick
