= Robert J. S. Page =

American politician

2nd Mayor of the City of Flint
- In office 1856–1857
- Preceded by: Grant Decker
- Succeeded by: Henry M. Henderson

Personal details
- Occupation: attorney, judge
- Profession: law

Robert J. S. Page was the second mayor of the Village (now City) of Flint, Michigan serving from 1856 to 1857.

== Early life ==
Page was an attorney who came to Flint in 1838. On October 22, 1844, he was appointed receiver in the Genesee District office of the U.S. Land Office.

== Political life ==
In 1850, he was selected to serve in the office of justice of the peace serving until 1851. He was elected as the second mayor of the Village of Flint in 1856 serving a one-year term. Later, he serve on the bench as a probate judge.

Political offices
| Preceded by Grant Decker | Mayor of Flint; 1856-1857 | Succeeded by Henry M. Henderson |
