= William S. Patrick =

American politician in Michigan

12th Mayor of the City of Flint, Michigan
- In office 1869–1870
- Preceded by: Samuel M. Axford
- Succeeded by: James B. Walker

William S. Patrick was an American politician. He was elected as the twelfth mayor of the Village of Flint in 1869, serving a single 1-year term.

Political offices
Preceded by Samuel M. Axford	Mayor of Flint; 1869-70	Succeeded by James B. Walker
