= James B. Walker =

American politician

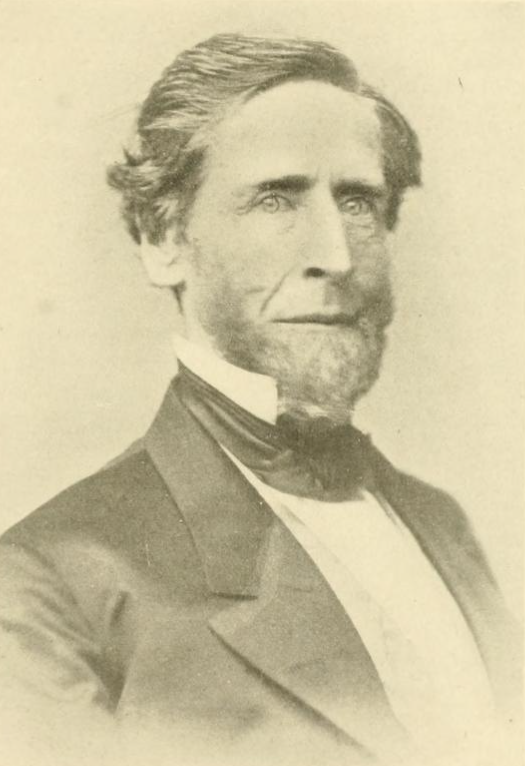

13th Mayor of the City of Flint, Michigan
- In office 1870–1871
- Preceded by: William S. Patrick
- Succeeded by: David Spencer Fox

Personal details
- Born: 1812 Locke, Cayuga County, New York
- Died: 1877 (aged 64–65)
- Children: Anna McCall
- Occupation: Clerk, banker
- Profession: Merchant

James B. Walker (1812–1877) was a Michigan politician.

== Early life ==
Walker was born in 1812 in Locke, Cayuga County, New York. He came to Flint, Michigan in 1836 and began working in as a clerk in Beach & Wesson dry goods store. Later, H.M. Henderson's dry goods store employed him. From 1838 to 1842, Walker operated a mercantile business on the north side of the Flint River. He building and ran a store at the corner of Kearsley and Saginaw streets from 1842 to 1858.

== Political life ==
As the governor's appointed state resident trustee, he was in charge of deaf, dumb and blind asylum's construction and continued as a trustee of the asylum from 1858 to 1873. He was elected as mayor of the City of Flint in 1870 serving a single 1-year term. The first pavement on Saginaw Street was laid during his term as Mayor.

== Post-Political life ==
In 1872, Walker was the first president and director of the Genesee Savings Bank. Walker died in Flint, 1877.

Political offices
Preceded by William S. Patrick	Mayor of Flint; 1870-71	Succeeded by David Spencer Fox
