= Oren Stone =

American politician

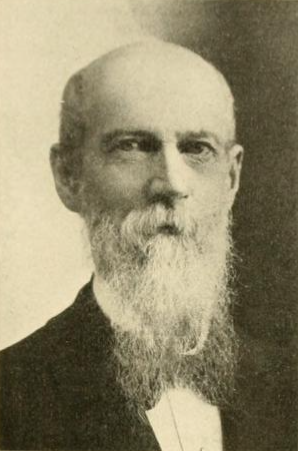

29th Mayor of the City of Flint, Michigan
- In office 1888–1889
- Preceded by: John C. Dayton
- Succeeded by: Frank D. Baker

Personal details
- Born: July 24, 1833 Auburn, Cayuga County, N.Y.
- Died: April 20, 1897 (aged 63) Flint, Michigan
- Resting place: Glenwood Cemetery, Flint
- Profession: Merchant

Oren Stone (July 24, 1833 – April 20, 1897) was a Michigan politician.

== Early life ==
On July 24, 1833, Stone was born in Auburn, Cayuga County, N.Y. He started Flint Woolen Mills with a partner and was owner of Stone's Opera House.

== Political life ==
He was elected as the Mayor of City of Flint in 1888 for a single 1-year term.

== Post-political life ==
Buried in Flint's Glenwood Cemetery, Stone died in Flint on April 20, 1897.

Political offices
Preceded by John C. Dayton	Mayor of Flint; 1888-89	Succeeded by Frank D. Baker
