= William Osmund Kelly =

American politician (1909–1974)

71st / 9th City Commission Mayor of the City of Flint, Michigan
- In office 1940–1944
- Preceded by: Oliver Tappin
- Succeeded by: Edwin C. McLogan

City Commissioner of the City of Flint, Michigan

Personal details
- Born: December 10, 1909 Flint, Michigan
- Died: July 1974 (aged 64)
- Spouse: Albina Jayman
- Education: Flint Junior College

Military service
- Allegiance: United States
- Branch/service: Navy
- Years of service: 1944–1946
- Battles/wars: World War II

William Osmund Kelly (December 10, 1909 – July 1974) was an American politician who served as mayor of Flint, Michigan.

He also filled the position of President for Saint Matthew Men's Club, the Flint Bowling Association and the Michigan Chapter of the National Association of Postmasters.

== Early life ==
Kelly was born on December 10, 1909, in Flint. He graduated from Saint Matthew High School in 1928. He then attended Flint Junior College and formed a band, Oz Kelly and his Orchestra, while there. The band played in Cleveland, Ohio, Milwaukee and Flint at the IMA Auditorium. In 1933, he was married to Albina Jayman.

== Political life ==
The Flint City Commission selected him as Mayor on November 12, 1940, and select for another two years. During World War II, Kelly resigned to join the Navy and served two years in the Pacific. In 1946, he was the Lieutenant Governor Democratic candidate but lost. Kelly was appointed in 1949 acting Postmaster—Flint then latter appointed 22nd Postmaster.

== Post-political life ==
In 1956, he became the Flint Manufacturer's Association Executive Director.

Party political offices
| Preceded by James H. Lee | Democratic nominee for Lieutenant Governor of Michigan; 1946 | Succeeded by John W. Connolly |
Political offices
| Preceded by Oliver Tappin | Mayor of Flint; 1940–1944 | Succeeded by Edwin C. McLogan |
