= Charles A. Mobley =

American politician

79th / 17th City Commission Mayor of the City of Flint, Michigan
- In office 1960–1962
- Preceded by: Robert J. Egan
- Succeeded by: George R. Poulos

City Commissioner of the City of Flint, Michigan

Personal details
- Born: April 7, 1897
- Died: April 8, 1989 (aged 92) Genesee County, Michigan
- Party: Republican

Charles A. Mobley (April 7, 1897 – April 8, 1989) was a Michigan politician.

== Political life ==
The Flint City Commission selected him as mayor for the years 1958–60. In 1962, he ran for Michigan state representative, 1962 (Genesee County 1st District). He ran again in 1964 in the 82nd District.

Political offices
Preceded by Robert J. Egan	Mayor of Flint; 1960–1962	Succeeded by George R. Poulos
