= Austin D. Alvord =

American politician

43rd Mayor of the City of Flint, Michigan
- In office 1902–1904
- Preceded by: Clark B. Dibble
- Succeeded by: Bruce J. McDonald

Personal details
- Born: April 1843 New Jersey, U.S.
- Died: December 3, 1924 (aged 81) Flint, Michigan
- Resting place: Gracelawn Cemetery; Flint, Michigan
- Party: Democratic
- Spouse: Phoebe Jane Powell

Austin D. Alvord (April 1843 – December 3, 1924) was a Michigan politician.

== Political life ==
He was elected on April 7, 1902, as the Mayor of City of Flint for the first of two one-year terms. In 1910, he ran again for mayor but was defeated by Republican Guy W. Selby.

Political offices
Preceded by Clark B. Dibble	Mayor of Flint; 1902–1904	Succeeded by Bruce J. McDonald
