= 2002 Flint mayoral recall election =

- March 5, 2002
- Recall Mayor Woodrow Stanley?

Results
Choice	Votes	%
Yes	15,863	56.25%
No	12,336	43.75%
Mayor before election
Woodrow Stanley
Nonpartisan
Mayor
Darnell Earley (temporary)
Nonpartisan

The 2002 Flint mayoral recall election took place on March 5, 2002. Mayor Woodrow Stanley, who had served as Mayor since 1991, faced a recall election over alleged mismanagement of city government. Stanley ultimately lost the election and was recalled from office, with 56 percent of voters supporting his recall.

== Campaign ==
On September 4, 2001, the Genesee County Election Commission approved recall language for Mayor Woodrow Stanley, which alleged that Stanley failed to adequately "maintain the city parks and recreation facilities," failed to "maintain city departments' equipment and personnel," failed "to provide financial records and account data for a timely 2000 audit," failed "to provide accurate revenue projections necessary to assess the 2001 fiscal budget," and failed "to market the city of Flint and attract investors." On Tuesday, December 4, 2001, recall proponents submitted nearly 13,000 petitions in support of Stanley's recall, 10,166 of which were validated, more than the 8,540 that were required. Stanley challenged the validity of the petitions and the legality of the recall election, but the challenges were ultimately rejected, enabling the March 5 recall election to proceed.

Stanley argued that the recall election was largely driven by white voters' animus toward him. As of the 2000 census, Flint was a majority-Black city, and supporters of Stanley argued that the recall effort was an effort to override Black voters. On election night, after Stanley was projected to have lost the election, he castigated the media for its treatment of him, saying, "This has been a Mississippi-style treatment of an African-American leader," and that "the stench of racism that reeks in this election will linger in the nostrils of this community for decades."

== Results ==
2002 Flint mayoral recall election
Choice	Votes	%
For	15,863	56.25
Against	12,336	43.75
Total	28,199	100.00
Source: Genesee County Clerk

== Aftermath ==
Following the recall election, city administrator Darnell Earley served as temporary mayor until a special election could be held to fill out the remainder of Stanley's term. The election was originally scheduled for May 7, 2002, but the state legislature postponed the election until August 6, 2002, when former Mayor James W. Rutherford was elected. After Stanley was recalled, he was elected to the Genesee County Commission in 2004 and to the State House in 2008.
