= Mathew Davison =

American politician (1839–1918)

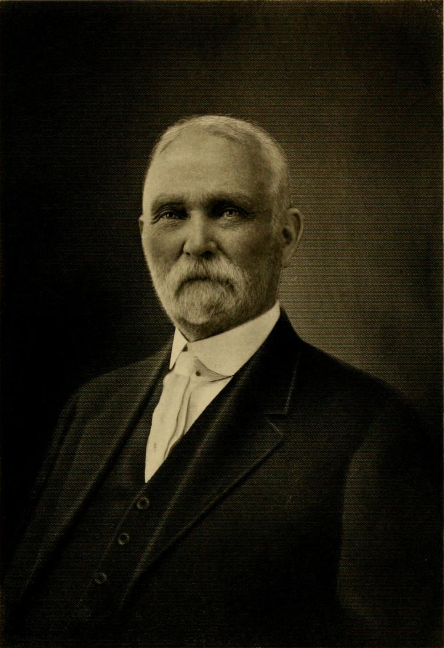

26th Mayor of the City of Flint, Michigan
- In office 1885–1886
- Preceded by: William W. Joyner
- Succeeded by: George T. Warren

Personal details
- Born: January 4, 1839 near Belfast, Ireland
- Died: September 9, 1918 (aged 79) Flint, Michigan

Mathew Davison (January 4, 1839 – September 9, 1918) was a Michigan politician.

== Early life ==
His first business was a clothing business. He was one of the area's largest landowners, owning large amounts of farm land. He served as the long time cashier of the Union Trust and Savings Bank.

== Political life ==
He was elected as the Mayor of the City of Flint in 1885 serving a 1-year term.

== Post-political life ==
By 1916, Davison was chairman of the board of Union Trust and Savings Bank.

Political offices
Preceded by William W. Joyner	Mayor of Flint; 1885-86	Succeeded by George T. Warren
