= The Paterson Building =

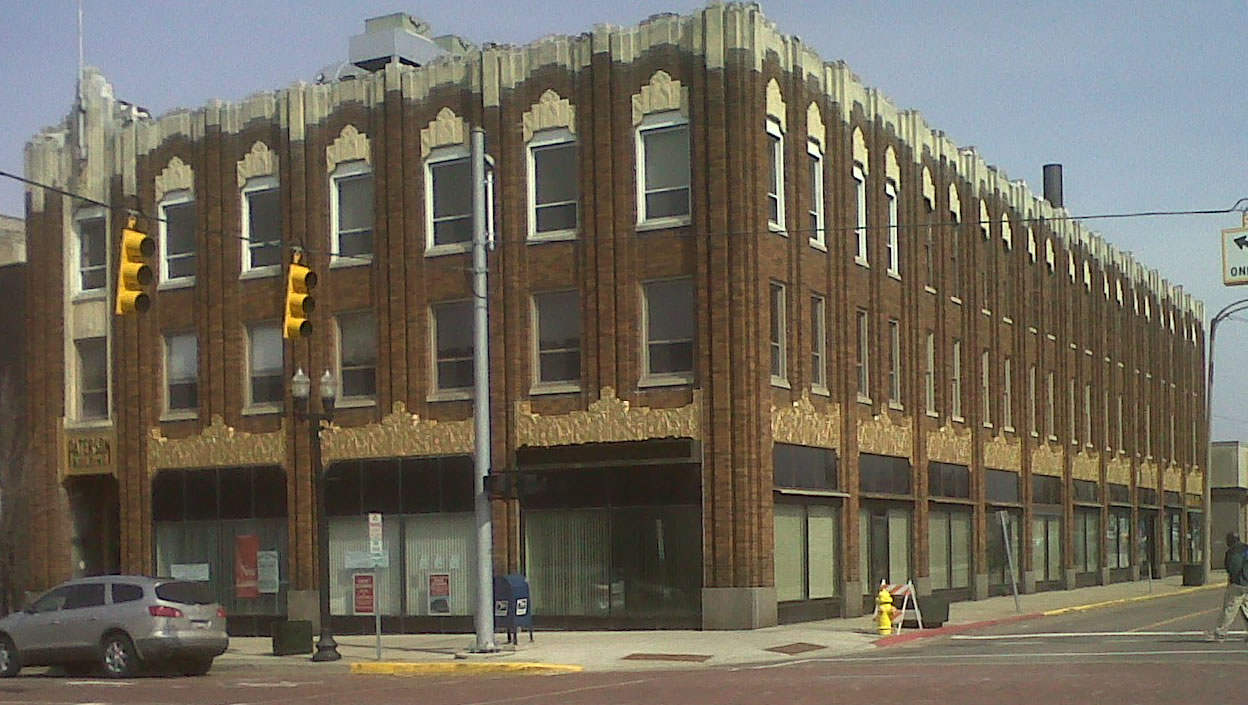
- Interactive map of the The Paterson Building area

General information
- Status: Completed
- Location: 653 S. Saginaw St., Flint, MI 48502, United States
- Coordinates: 43.0144°N 83.6889°W
- Owner: Communities First, Inc.

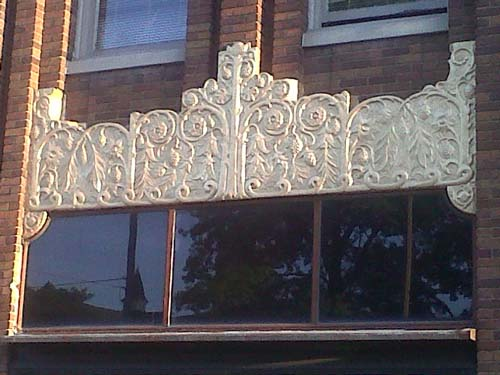
Exterior Art Deco Terracotta

The Paterson Building is a historic structure located at 653 South Saginaw Street and Third Street in Flint, Michigan. It was built by William A. Paterson of the W. A. Paterson Company who first built carriages there starting in 1869. He switched to manufacturing automobiles in 1909, and the company built well-regarded automobiles until 1923.

The building was damaged by fire and rebuilt in 1931 in the art deco style. The Paterson building had been owned by Thomas W. Collison Jr. of the Collison Family for 30 years under their parent corporation Thomas W. Collison & Co., Inc.

It was sold in 2019 to former NBA basketball player Morris Peterson's Flintstone Investment Group. In 2023 Peterson lost ownership of the building and the building was returned to the Collison Family. In January 2024, the Charles Stewart Mott Foundation awarded a $3.5 million grant to Communities First, Inc., a Flint-based nonprofit community development corporation, allowing the organization to purchase and rehabilitate the building. This redevelopment project is currently ongoing. The building has three office floors with a full garage in the basement level. The building consists of mainly law and medical offices. There are also retail stores on the Third Street side. The building's rich Art Deco design has been maintained throughout the interior and exterior of the building.
