= Paul Lovegrove =

American politician

75th / 13th City Commission Mayor of the City of Flint, Michigan
- In office 1950–1952
- Preceded by: George G. Wills
- Succeeded by: Donald W. Riegle Sr.

City Commissioner of the City of Flint, Michigan

Paul Lovegrove was a Michigan politician.

== Political life ==
The Flint City Commission selected Lovegrove as mayor in 1950 and then selected him again for another year.

Political offices
Preceded by George G. Wills	Mayor of Flint; 1950–1952	Succeeded by Donald W. Riegle Sr.
