= Andrew J. Ward =

American politician

34th Mayor of the City of Flint, Michigan
- In office 1893–1894
- Preceded by: George E. Taylor
- Succeeded by: Arthur C. McCall

Personal details
- Born: February 16, 1843 Medina County, Ohio
- Died: March 9, 1914 (aged 71) Grand Haven, Michigan

Andrew Job Ward (February 16, 1843 – March 9, 1914) was a Michigan politician. He was elected as the mayor of City of Flint in 1893 for a single 1-year term.

Political offices
Preceded by George E. Taylor	Mayor of Flint; 1893-94	Succeeded by Arthur C. McCall
