= Donald R. Cronin =

American politician

83rd / 21st City Commission Mayor of the City of Flint, Michigan
- In office 1968–1970
- Preceded by: Floyd J. McCree
- Succeeded by: Francis E. Limmer

City Commissioner of the City of Flint, Michigan

Personal details
- Died: April 20, 2006 (age 76)

Donald R. Cronin was a Michigan mayor and politician.

== Political life ==
The Flint City Commission selected Cronin as mayor for the years 1968-70.

Political offices
Preceded by Floyd J. McCree	Mayor of Flint; 1968–1970	Succeeded by Francis E. Limmer
