= George E. Taylor (Michigan politician) =

American politician

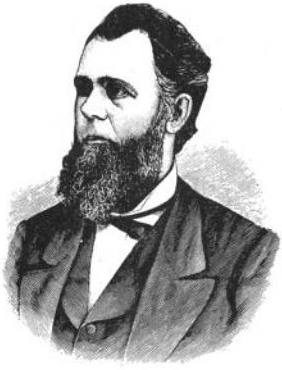

Judge of the Probate Court
- Constituency: Genesee County

Register of Deeds
- Constituency: Genesee County

33rd Mayor of the City of Flint, Michigan
- In office 1892–1893
- Preceded by: Francis H. Rankin Jr.
- Succeeded by: Andrew J. Ward

Supervisor
- In office 1865–1873

Alderman
- Constituency: 2nd Ward, City of Flint

Personal details
- Born: March 21, 1838 Oakland County, Michigan
- Died: March 8, 1903 (aged 64) home, Flint
- Spouse(s): 1) Sarah E. Beardslee, (-1868); 2) Euphemia A. Freeman (m. 1871)
- Relations: Isaac and Margaret (Davis) Taylor, parents
- Occupation: teacher, lawyer, judge
- Profession: legal

George E. Taylor (March 21, 1838 – March 8, 1903) was a Michigan politician and judge.

== Early life ==
On March 21, 1838, Taylor was born to Isaac and Margaret (Davis) Taylor in Oakland County, Michigan. At the age of 18, he taught school. He started studying law at age 21 and was admitted a few years later.

== Political life ==
Beginning with Taylor's election in 1865, he served eight years in the office of county supervisor. Additional, he held the offices of Register of Deeds, State Senator and Flint City second ward Alderman. He was elected as the Mayor of City of Flint in 1892 for a single 1-year term. That same year, he was elected Judge of the Probate Court.

== Post-political life ==
On March 8, 1903, Taylor died at his home in Flint.

Political offices
Preceded by Francis H. Rankin Jr.	Mayor of Flint; 1892-93	Succeeded by Andrew J. Ward
