= Clark B. Dibble =

American politician (1860–1932)

42nd Mayor of the City of Flint, Michigan
- In office 1901–1902
- Preceded by: Charles A. Cummings
- Succeeded by: Austin D. Alvord

Personal details
- Born: May 27, 1860 Genesee County, Michigan
- Died: July 24, 1932 (aged 72) Genesee County, Michigan
- Party: Democratic

Clark B. Dibble (May 27, 1860 – July 24, 1932) was a Michigan politician.

== Political life ==
He was elected as the Mayor of City of Flint in 1901 for a single 1-year term. He ran for the State Senate, District 13 in 1902 losing to George Barnes.

Political offices
| Preceded by Charles A. Cummings | Mayor of Flint; 1901–1902 | Succeeded by Austin D. Alvord |
