= William B. McCreery =

American politician

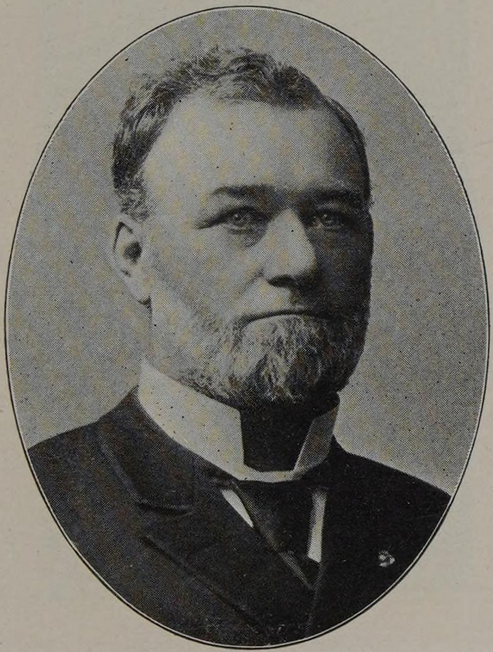

14th State Treasurer of Michigan
- In office 1875–1878
- Governor: John J. Bagley; Charles Croswell
- Preceded by: Victory P. Collier
- Succeeded by: Benjamin D. Pritchard
- Constituency: Michigan

9th Mayor of the City of Flint, Michigan
- In office 1865–1867
- Preceded by: William Hamilton
- Succeeded by: Austin B. Witherbee

Personal details
- Born: August 27, 1836 Mt. Morris, Livingston County, New York
- Died: December 9, 1896 (aged 60)
- Spouse: Ada B. Fenton
- Relations: Reuben McCreery, Father; Charles H. McCeery, Brother; William M. Fenton, Father-in-law
- Children: Fenton Reuben
- Profession: Law

Military service
- Allegiance: United States
- Branch/service: Army
- Rank: 21st Michigan Infantry
- Unit: Company F, Second Michigan Infantry
- Commands: 21st Michigan Infantry
- Battles/wars: Civil War -- Stones River; Williamsburg; Chickamauga

William Barber McCreery (August 27, 1836 – December 9, 1896) was an American politician and diplomat who lived much of his life in Michigan.

== Early life ==
McCreery was born on August 27, 1836, in Mt. Morris, Livingston County, New York. In 1859, he was admitted to the county bar.

== Civil War ==
Initially assigned to Company F, Second Michigan Infantry, He was later a Lieutenant Colonel commanding the 21st Michigan Infantry with the Union Army in the Civil War. He fought with valor and was serious wounded at Williamsburg, Virginia, and at Chickamauga. He was captured by the Confederates after being wounded at the Battle of Chickamauga. He escaped in 1864 from Libby Prison in Richmond, Virginia reportedly by the way of a tunnel dug by himself and other prisoners.

== After the war ==
Returning to Flint, McCreery enter the general merchandising business with F. W. Judd then in the lumber industry with a sawmill on the banks of the Flint River just south of the Saginaw Road bridge. In the Grant administration, he became the district collector of internal revenue. He was involved in the Flint City Water Works Company as its president and as an original stockholders and in the Grand Trunk Railway Flint-Lansing extension construction.

== Political life ==
He was elected as the ninth mayor of the City of Flint in 1865 serving two 1-year terms. Elected Michigan State Treasurer in 1875 serving until 1878. Appointed in 1890 as U.S. Consul in Valparaíso.

== Post-political Life ==
He served as a director of First National Bank of Flint. McCreery died on December 9, 1896, in Flint, Michigan, and laid to rest at Glenwood Cemetery, Flint, Michigan.

Political offices
Preceded by Victory P. Collier	Michigan State Treasurer; 1875-1878	Succeeded by Benjamin D. Pritchard
Preceded by William Hamilton	Mayor of Flint; 1865-67	Succeeded by Austin B. Witherbee
