= Charles A. Cummings =

American politician

41st Mayor of the City of Flint, Michigan
- In office 1900–1901
- Preceded by: Hugh Alexander Crawford
- Succeeded by: Clark B. Dibble

Personal details
- Party: Democratic

Charles A. Cummings, or Charles A. Comings, was a Michigan politician.

== Political life ==
He was elected on April 2, 1900 as the Mayor of City of Flint for a single one-year term.

Political offices
Preceded by Hugh Alexander Crawford	Mayor of Flint; 1900–1901	Succeeded by Clark B. Dibble
