= John C. Zimmerman Sr. =

American politician

36th Mayor of the City of Flint, Michigan
- In office 1895–1896
- Preceded by: Arthur C. McCall
- Succeeded by: Samuel C. Randall

Personal details
- Born: May 12, 1835 Free City of Frankfurt
- Died: October 26, 1935 (aged 100)
- Resting place: Glenwood Cemetery, Flint
- Spouse: Elizabeth Dietz
- Children: John C. Jr.
- Occupation: brickmason, merchant

John C. Zimmerman Sr. (May 12, 1835 – October 26, 1935) was a Michigan politician.

== Early life ==
Zimmerman was born on May 12, 1835, in Free City of Frankfurt. Zimmerman emigrated to the United States of America around 1853.

== Political life ==
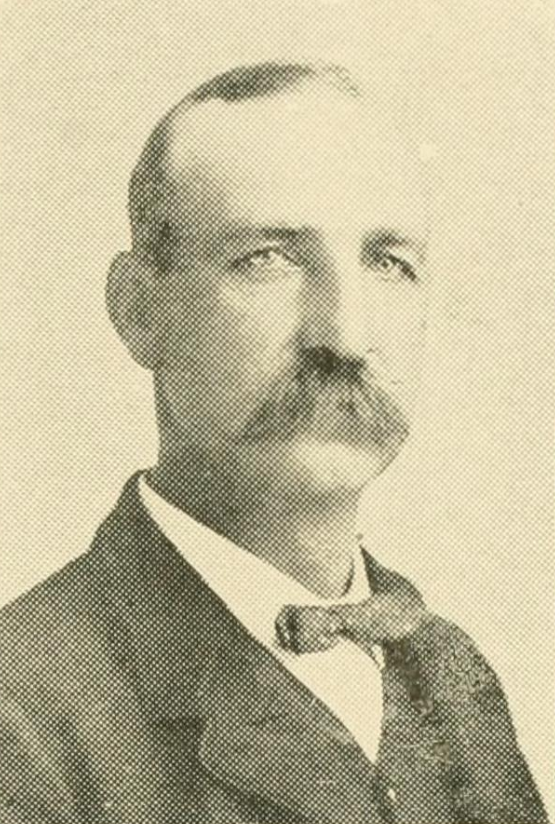
John C. Zimmerman Sr.'s son, Genesee County Sheriff John C. Zimmerman Jr.

He was elected as the Mayor of the City of Flint in 1895 for a single 1-year term.

== Personal life ==
John C. Zimmerman Sr. was married to Elizabeth Dietz. Together, they had seven children. Their second child, John C. Zimmerman Jr., would later serve as sheriff of Genesee County, Michigan.

== Post-political life ==
He was buried at Glenwood Cemetery, Flint, after his death on October 26, 1935.

Political offices
| Preceded by Arthur C. McCall | Mayor of Flint; 1895-96 | Succeeded by Samuel C. Randall |
