= William W. Joyner =

American politician (c.1831–??)

25th Mayor of the City of Flint, Michigan
- In office 1884–1885
- Preceded by: George E. Newell
- Succeeded by: Mathew Davison

Personal details
- Born: c. 1831 Sumner County, Tennessee

William W. Joyner (born c. 1831) was a Michigan politician.

== Political life ==
Joyner served as Flint Post Office's Postmaster. He was elected as the Mayor of the City of Flint in 1884 serving a 1-year term.

Political offices
Preceded by George E. Newell	Mayor of Flint; 1884-85	Succeeded by Mathew Davison
