= Harry K. Cull =

American politician

81st / 19th City Commission Mayor of the City of Flint, Michigan
- In office 1964–1966
- Preceded by: George R. Poulos
- Succeeded by: Floyd J. McCree

City Commissioner of the City of Flint, Michigan
- Constituency: 6th Ward

Personal details
- Spouse: Mabel Irene Pollock
- Relations: brothers: Carl, Robert and Elton sister: Elizabeth Carpenter
- Children: Constance Cooper; June Robinette; Roberta Lukins; Harry K. Cull, Jr.
- Occupation: Insurancy agent

Harry K. Cull (March 2, 1911 – February 2, 2000) was a Michigan politician.

== Political life ==
The Flint City Commission selected him as mayor for the years 1962-64.

Political offices
Preceded by George R. Poulos	Mayor of Flint; 1962–1964	Succeeded by Floyd J. McCree
