= Matthew S. Collier =

American mayor

Matt Collier

88th Mayor of Flint
- In office 1987–1991
- Preceded by: James A. Sharp Jr.
- Succeeded by: Woodrow Stanley

Personal details
- Born: Matthew Samuel Collier; November 15, 1957 (age 68) Flint, Michigan, U.S.
- Party: Democratic
- Children: 4
- Education: United States Military Academy (BS); Harvard University (MPA)

Military service
- Allegiance: United States
- Branch/service: United States Army
- Years of service: 1979–1985
- Rank: Captain
- Awards: Ranger Tab; Meritorious Service Medal; Expert Infantryman Badge

Matthew Samuel Collier is an American entrepreneur, U.S. Army veteran, and politician who served as the mayor of Flint, Michigan from 1987 to 1991. Taking office at 29, he was among the youngest mayors elected in a major city in the United States.

Following his stint as mayor, he served in executive roles with several technology companies. In January 2015, Collier was appointed as Senior Advisor to VA Secretary Bob McDonald at the U.S. Department of Veterans Affairs where he led public-private partnerships for the agency.

== Early life and education ==
Matt Collier was born on November 15, 1957, in Flint, Michigan. Collier grew up on Flint's Northwest side. Collier attended the United States Military Academy at West Point, where he played hockey and earned a BS in general engineering in 1979.

Following his graduation from West Point, Collier achieved airborne-ranger status, and served as an officer in the U.S. Army for six years. As a captain, in his final military assignment at the High Technology Test Bed in Fort Lewis, Washington, Collier became the youngest program manager in the Army. Shortly after his return to Flint, MI, Collier announced he would seek the office of Mayor of Flint. After a four-year term as Mayor, Collier earned his Master in Public Administration (MPA) from Harvard University in 1993.

== Family life ==
Collier is the father of four children: Ian, Charlie, Amy, and Sam.

Collier has four brothers. Two of them, Mark Collier (USMA '73) and Craig Collier (USMA '86) also graduated from West Point and served as Infantry officers in the U.S. Army. Craig and Mark are career soldiers and have frequently served in combat locations.

== Term as Mayor ==
=== The First Day in Office ===
In 1987 Matt Collier defeated the incumbent Flint mayor, James Sharp. Issues concerning the local economy, jobs, government spending, and crime were paramount.

Collier was elected with 54 percent of the vote. His "eventful" first day on the job as the Mayor of Flint occurred on November 9, 1987. After only a few hours in office, Collier fired the entire City of Flint executive staff that remained from the previous administration. Collier received word of a major oil spill on the Flint River; attended a previously planned (by the previous administration) press conference with the then-Governor of Michigan, James Blanchard; discovered that the news media had received the first "news leak" of his administration; and attended a dinner party with the private knowledge of a death-threat phoned into his office against him. At the end of his eventful first day, Collier watched the local evening news and learned of a politically motivated recall effort initiated against him. The first day had proved to be baptism by fire for the former Army officer

=== Flint Events During Collier's Term ===
During his time as Flint's mayor, Collier was focused on reducing crime, balancing the city's budget to avoid bankruptcy, and restoring the Flint economy. Major achievements during Collier's term include

- The retiring of a $4 million deficit inherited from prior administrations. Collier and his staff achieved a balanced budget each year of his term.
- The city partnered with General Motors to convert a soon to be closed automobile plant into GM's $110 million, 1.25 million ft2 "Great Lakes Technology Center." This business-government venture is estimated to have resulted in over 7,000 new private sector jobs for Flint.
- Unemployment in the city of Flint dropped from a high of 23% in 1988 to 7.7% in September 1990 according to the U.S. Department of Labor

In 1988, the City of Flint's contract for water with the City of Detroit expired. Collier negotiated a new contract in conjunction with Genesee County officials to reduce water costs and increase efficiency for Flint residents. This contract was in effect for a number of years and preceded the Flint water crisis.

=== Controversy ===
In 1989, midway through Collier's four-year term in office, Roger & Me, a film directed by Flint native Michael Moore, premiered nationally. The film described the effects of General Motors' cutbacks on Flint during the 1970s and 1980s. Collier contended that the town had cut its unemployment rate nearly in half in the two years Collier had been in office while GM had added jobs and the budgets were balanced to where the city had a surplus. According to Collier, the film "crippled the city's self-image and demoralized Flint as a whole." Collier stated that "the film ultimately made it increasingly difficult for him and his administration to champion the city's successes." Collier's administration starting receiving the sympathy of the nation and his administration was getting phone calls offering to donate literally $1 at a time to the city.

In response to the film's release, Collier was quoted in newspapers and magazines throughout the United States, including the Wall Street Journal, The New York Times, and Time Magazine, and Collier was featured on ABC's Primetime Live, and other national television programs, challenging the accuracy of the movie. The film did not directly criticize Collier's mayoral performance and the events portrayed in the film took place just prior to and up to the very first months of his term as mayor.

== Career ==
=== Business life ===
In September 1995, Collier became the vice president of engineering for Sensors, Inc., Saline, Michigan – a producer of auto-emission testing sensors. Prior to his stint at Sensors, Collier worked as the US Distributor Sales Manager for a UK-based labeling and coding equipment manufacturer, Willett America, with its US base of operations in Atlanta, Georgia.

In 1997, Collier became the president (and later, part owner) of SAFER Systems, a Camarillo, California–based software company that graphically depicts 3D gas plumes in the aftermath of a hazardous material spill. The software is primarily used to help guide clean-up and evacuation procedures.

In 2009, Collier became the executive vice president (EVP) of then Los Angeles–based Symark Software (now BeyondTrust Software, Inc.).

Collier is the Founder and CEO of VetAccel Inc. He is the Chief Strategy Officer for OutcomeMD, and a senior advisor with Fieldstone Equity Partners. He also serves on the board of directors for the Concussion Legacy Foundation and the National Association of Veterans’ Research and Education Foundations (NAVREF) Board. In 2019, Collier joined the Faculty of the Thayer Leader Development Group at West Point.

Collier is frequently featured as a keynote speaker and panelist at events and conferences around the world, including the U.S. Military Academy at West Point, the Kennedy School of Government at Harvard University, the University of Michigan's Ross School of Business, UCLA's Anderson School of Management, and many others.

=== U.S. Department of Veterans Affairs ===
In January 2015, Collier was appointed by President Obama to Senior Advisor to the Secretary at the U.S. Department of Veterans Affairs. In this role, he spearheaded the department's strategy for public-private partnerships to better address and support the needs of Veterans. Collier launched the VA Center for Strategic Partnerships and directed hundreds of millions of dollars in partnership investments over at two-year period to support the needs of Veterans and their families. Notable partnerships include Amazon, IBM, GE, Philips, Johnson & Johnson, Prostate Cancer Foundation, Wounded Warrior Project, and Google.
