= Floyd J. McCree =

American politician (1923–1988)

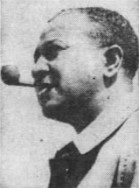

Register of Deeds
- In office 1971–1988
- Succeeded by: Jeffrey Brohn
- Constituency: Genesee County, Michigan

82nd / 20th City Commission Mayor of the City of Flint, Michigan
- In office 1966–1968
- Preceded by: Harry K. Cull
- Succeeded by: Donald R. Cronin.

City Commissioner of the City of Flint, Michigan
- In office 1958–1970

Personal details
- Born: Floyd Joel McCree; March 29, 1923 Webster Grove, MO
- Died: June 15, 1988 (aged 65)
- Party: Democratic
- Spouse: Leeberta Townsend (m. 1948–1988) (his death)
- Children: 4
- Education: Lincoln University

Floyd J. McCree (March 29, 1923 – June 15, 1988) was a Michigan politician. He was the first African American mayor of Flint, Michigan.

== Early life ==
Floyd Joel Mcree was born in Webster Grove, Missouri, on March 29, 1923, the son of Jordan Daniel McCree, Sr. and Minnie Blackwell. He went to high school in St. Louis and attended Lincoln University, Jefferson City.

McCree served in the South Pacific in World War II in the army, rising to the rank of staff sergeant. After leaving the army, he was hired at the Buick foundry in Flint, becoming a foreman. He was later promoted to supervisor of maintenance.

== Political life ==
McCree was elected to the Flint City Commission in 1958 which selected him as mayor for the years 1966–68. During his time as mayor, he pushed for open housing and employment equal opportunity.

In 1967, he was involved in trying to end the violence in Detroit during the 1967 riots. In the same year, after the City Commission refused to adopt an open housing ordinance, he threatened to resign as mayor. Other prominent African-Americans joined in threatening to resign from public boards. The open housing law was later adopted in a charged contested referendum. McCree continued serving on the City Commission until 1970. In 1970, he was a Michigan state representatives candidate for the 82nd district.

In 1971, McCree took office as Genesee County Register of deeds. He ran for mayor under a new charter that directly elected a strong mayor in 1975 and 1979, losing both times to James W. Rutherford.

Election	McCree votes	Rutherford votes
1975	20,474	20,679
1979	12,902	20,738

McCree continued to be elected County Register, but he died on June 15, 1988, before the primary election.

== Legacy ==
On April 4, 2022, a bronze statue of McCree by the artist Joe Rundell was unveiled in front of the Flint City Hall. It was financed by a fundraising campaign by the Community Foundation of Greater Flint.

== See also ==
- List of first African-American mayors

Political offices
Preceded by	Register of Deeds of Genesee County, Michigan; 1971–1988	Succeeded by Jeffrey Brohn
Preceded by Harry K. Cull	Mayor of Flint, Michigan; 1966–1968	Succeeded by Donald R. Cronin
