= Samuel C. Randall =

American politician (1837–1909)

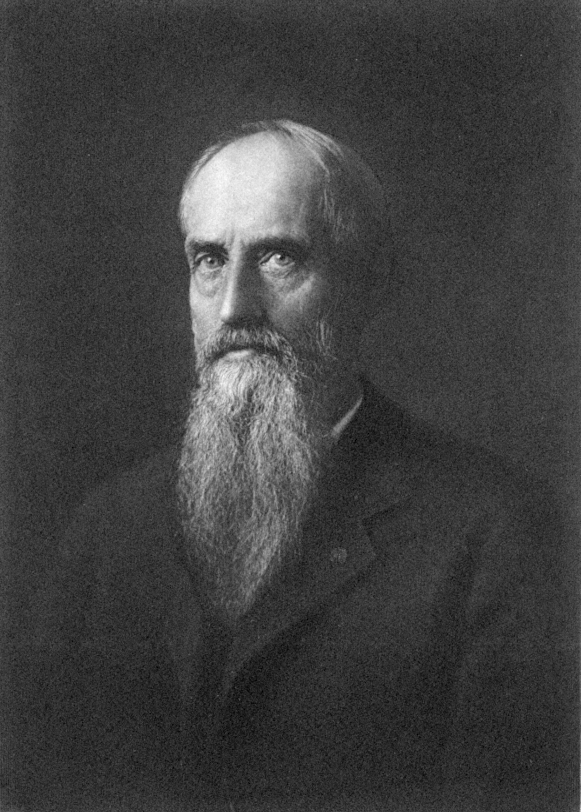

37th Mayor of the City of Flint, Michigan
- In office 1897–1898
- Preceded by: John C. Zimmerman Sr.
- Succeeded by: Milton C. Pettibone

Personal details
- Born: May 1837 Vestal, New York
- Died: 1909 (aged 71–72)

Military service
- Allegiance: United States
- Branch/service: Union Army
- Rank: captain
- Battles/wars: Civil War

Samuel C. Randall (May 1837 – 1909) was a Michigan politician. He was a thirty-third-degree Mason and a grand commander of Michigan Knights Templar.

== Early life ==
Randall was born in Vestal, New York. In the early 1850s, he came to Flint. He served in the Union Army during the Civil War finishing up at the rank of captain. He was in the lumbering industry. Additional, he was a director and vice-president of National Bank of Flint.

== Political life ==
He was elected as the Mayor of City of Flint in 1897 for a single 1-year term.

== Post-political life ==
Randall died in 1909.

Political offices
Preceded by John C. Zimmerman Sr.	Mayor of Flint; 1897–98	Succeeded by Milton C. Pettibone
