= Henry M. Henderson =

American politician

3rd Mayor of the City of Flint
- In office 1857–1858
- Preceded by: Robert J. S. Page
- Succeeded by: William M. Fenton

Personal details
- Relations: James Henderson, Brother
- Occupation: dry goods, banking
- Profession: businessman

Henry M. Henderson was the third mayor of the Village (now City) of Flint, Michigan serving from 1857 to 1858.

== Early life ==
In 1836, Henry M. Henderson left Livingston County, New York and came to Flint opening a dry goods business together with his brother, James. In 1842, the brother constructed the Henderson block. When the First National Bank of Flint was formed in 1865, Henderson became president and a director of the bank.

== Political life ==
He was elected as the third mayor of the Village of Flint in 1857 serving a one-year term.

Political offices
Preceded by Robert J. S. Page	Mayor of Flint; 1857-58	Succeeded by William M. Fenton
