= Frank D. Baker =

American politician

Sheriff
- In office 1891–1892?
- Constituency: Genesee County, Michigan

32nd Mayor of the City of Flint, Michigan
- In office 1889–1890
- Preceded by: Oren Stone
- Succeeded by: William A. Paterson
- Constituency: City of Flint, Michigan

Alderman

Personal details
- Born: October 10, 1852 Biddeford, Devonshire, England
- Died: June 6, 1927 (aged 74)
- Resting place: Evergreen Cemetery, Grand Blanc
- Spouse: Mattie Ritter
- Education: University of Michigan
- Occupation: Teacher, Doctor, pharmacist, real estate
- Profession: Medicine

Frank D. Baker (October 10, 1852 – June 6, 1927) was a Michigan politician. He was an active member in the Odd Fellows, Masons, and Knights of the Maccabees.

== Early life ==
Born near Biddeford, Devonshire, England on October 10, 1852, Frank D. Baker came to Flint, Michigan by the way of Quebec, Canada in 1856. He graduated from Flint High School in 1872. He then taught school for a while with a one-year stint in La Grange, Illinois. Attending the University of Michigan, he first majored in Literary then after a year switch to the Medicine school in 1877. After graduating in 1880, he set up a practice in Tuscola County, Michigan then for a short time in Edwardsville, Illinois. Returning to the area in 1881, Baker bought a farm in Clayton Township and started the pharmaceutical firm of Miller & Baker. In 1989 the drug business was sold. He also was involved in the real estate business.

== Political life ==
Baker was elected as an Alderman then as the Mayor of the City of Flint in 1889 for a single 1-year term. Then he was elected Sheriff of Genesee County in 1891.

== Post-political life ==
Upon his death on June 6, 1927, he was buried in Evergreen Cemetery, Grand Blanc.

Political offices
Preceded by Oren Stone	Mayor of Flint; 1889-90	Succeeded by William A. Paterson
