= James W. Rutherford =

American mayor

86th and 90th Mayor of Flint
- In office 1975–1983
- Preceded by: Paul Calvin Visser, City Commission Mayor
- Succeeded by: James A. Sharp, Jr.
- In office August 6, 2002 – 2003
- Preceded by: Darnell Earley (Acting)
- Succeeded by: Don Williamson

Flint Downtown Development Authority Director
- In office 2003–2008
- Succeeded by: Larry Ford, interim

Deputy City Manager, City of Flint
- In office 1963–1965

Personal details
- Born: April 23, 1925 Flint, Michigan
- Died: January 14, 2010 (aged 84) Flint, Michigan
- Party: Democratic
- Spouse(s): Dorothy Petyak; Betty Merrill (divorced)
- Relations: Harry and Isabelle, parents; Genevieve Young, fiancée
- Children: Michael, Jimmy, Marcia and Michele
- Education: Flint Central High School; Flint Junior College; Michigan State University
- Profession: Law enforcement

James W. Rutherford (April 23, 1925 – January 14, 2010) was a mayor of the City of Flint, Michigan serving as the first "strong" mayor elected under Flint's 1974 charter. Rutherford served for two terms. Rutherford was elected as a caretaker mayor after Mayor Stanley was recalled and an Emergency Financial Manager, Ed Kurtz, was appointed by the state.

== Biography ==
=== Early life ===
James W. Rutherford was born on April 23, 1925, to Harry and Isabelle Rutherford. Harry was a Buick worker. His family lived on the east side of the city and he eventually attended Flint Central High School. From 1945 to 1947, he served in the U.S. Navy. He married Dorothy Petyak in 1947. They had four children, two boys and two girls.

=== Police work ===
In 1948, Rutherford joined the Flint City Police Department. In 1953, he was promoted to detective. He was lead detective on a Flint horse racing bookie operation from 1954 to 1955 which lead to 14 conviction or guilty pleas. Rutherford attended Flint Junior College (since renamed Mott Community College) graduating in 1958 with an associate degree with honors. He then attended Michigan State University (MSU) attaining a bachelor's degree in police administration with honors in 1960. Later he continued at MSU, and earned a master's degree. Also in 1960, he arrested on gambling charges some suspected Mafia leaders. In 1961, he assisted Flint Junior College in developing the state's first police administration program. From 1963 to 1965, Rutherford served as deputy city manager rejoining the police department afterwards and being promoted to police inspector. In 1966, he was considered one of 10 outstanding police officers in the country. Rutherford was promoted to Police chief in 1967 and operated a mobile city office in 1969. His wife, Dorothy, died in 1974. Rutherford resigned as Police Chief to run for Mayor in 1975.

=== Political ===
Rutherford was elected mayor of the City of Flint, Michigan in 1975 as the first "strong" mayor elected under Flint's 1974 charter, defeating former city commission Mayor Floyd J. McCree. That same year, Rutherford married his second wife, Betty Merrill. In 1977, Rutherford donated $22,000 to the city for an ambulance which would serve until 2010.

Running for reelection in 1979, he defeated McCree again, 20,738 to 12,902. Facing a budget shortage, Rutherford laid off 300 employees. That same year, he announced, with the backing of the Mott Foundation, the purchase of the IMA Auditorium and its annex for $2.4 million for future development into AutoWorld with a projected cost of $38.5 million. AutoWorld encouraged other downtown development such as the Hyatt Regency Hotel, which opened in 1981; Water Street Pavilion; and Windmill Place. General Motors announced in 1982 a redevelopment plan for Buick City that included helping the city with infrastructure.

Attempting to win a third term as mayor in 1983, Rutherford instead lost to James A. Sharp, Jr. by 21,718 to 20,467. He took severance pay of $24,000, as well as some of his appointees, which triggered a lawsuit. With his top aides, he formed the Rutherford Group, Inc. which went on to run Mrs D's Sandwich Shop and a coffee service both for delivery to Total gas stations, Sunshine convenience and Action Auto stores throughout southeast Michigan, the three Harpos pizzeria locations, and a downtown Coney Island cart.

After attending a Toughman Contest in 1984 at the IMA Sports Arena, Rutherford fought a robber for several minutes but was robbed of "a substantial amount of money" and received minor injuries.

Running for Genesee County Clerk as a Democrat in 1984, he lost in the primary to John H. Trecha, the incumbent, by 73 votes, 13,444 to 13,371. Rutherford ran once again for mayor of Flint in 1987, but came in third out of seven candidates in the primary with Sharp and Matthew S. Collier continuing on to the general election.

Moving back to the private sector in 1989, he worked as head of public relations for Windmill Place, then owned by businessman Don Williamson. Rutherford became Williamson's co-campaign manager for his run for mayor of Flint in 1991, assisting in filing petitions, but Williamson failed to advance out of the primary. In 1999, he aided state Rep. Vera B. Rison in her run for mayor by appearing in a television commercial, however Rison took third in the primary.

After the March 5, 2002, recall of Woodrow Stanley as mayor, Rutherford failed to collect enough signatures to get on the ballot. However, the election was canceled due to the state's financial review of the city and a financial manager, Ed Kurtz, was named for the city. When the election was rescheduled, Rutherford collected enough signatures to appear on the ballot for mayor, becoming the only candidate on the ballot. Rutherford won the Flint Mayoral election over write in candidate, Arthur J. Pointer—11,239 to 4,712.

In 2003, Rutherford became the director of the Flint Downtown Development Authority and continued in this capacity under mayor Don Williamson serving until 2008.

=== Death ===
Rutherford died January 14, 2010, in his sleep, at the age of 84 years.

Political offices
Preceded by Darnell Earley, temporary (City Administrator)	Mayor of Flint; 2002–2004	Succeeded by Don Williamson
Preceded by (Paul Calvin Visser) (City Commission Mayor)	Mayor of Flint; 1975–1983	Succeeded by James A. Sharp, Jr.
Preceded by	Director of Flint Downtown Development Authority; 2003–2008	Succeeded by Larry Ford, interim
