= Harold E. Bradshaw =

American politician (1898–1975)

Harold Elmore Bradshaw

68th / 6th City Commission Mayor of the City of Flint, Michigan
- In office 1936–1938
- Preceded by: George E. Boysen
- Succeeded by: Harry M. Comins

City Commissioner of the City of Flint, Michigan

Personal details
- Born: November 5, 1898 Davison, Genesee County, Michigan
- Died: July 1975 (aged 76) Lansing, Michigan
- Party: Republican
- Spouse: Retha D. Sheley
- Relations: John P. H. Bradshaw and Winifred L. (Hurd) Bradshaw, parents

Military service
- Allegiance: United States
- Branch/service: Army
- Battles/wars: World War I

Harold Elmore Bradshaw (November 5, 1898 – July 1975) was a Michigan politician. He was a member of American Legion, Forty and Eight, Veterans of Foreign Wars, Freemasons and Elks.

== Early life ==
Bradshaw was born to John P. H. Bradshaw and Winifred L. (Hurd) Bradshaw on November 5, 1898, in Davison, Genesee County, Michigan. During World War I, he served in the U.S. Army. On December 24, 1920, he was married to Retha D. Sheley.

== Political life ==
The Flint City Commission select him as mayor in 1936 for two one-year terms.

Political offices
Preceded by George E. Boysen	Mayor of Flint; 1936–1938	Succeeded by Harry M. Comins
