= Genesee County Savings Bank =

- U.S. National Register of Historic Places
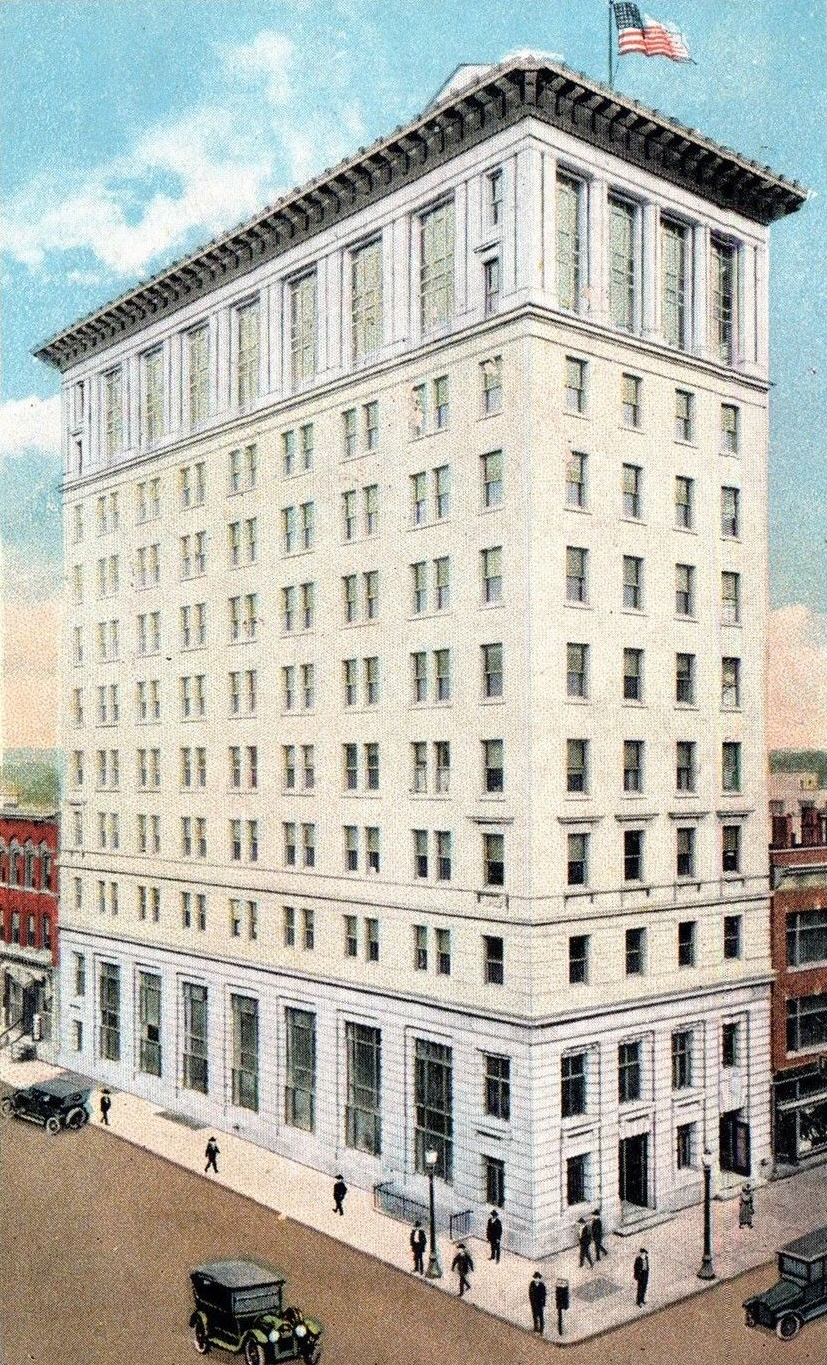
- Genesse County Savings Bank c. 1924
- Interactive map
- Location: 352 S. Saginaw St., Flint, Michigan
- Coordinates: 43°1′1″N 83°41′32″W
- Built: 1919
- Architect: Hodgson Brothers
- NRHP reference No.: 100001836
- Added to NRHP: November 27, 2017

The Genesee County Savings Bank is an office building located at 352 South Saginaw Street in Flint, Michigan. It was listed on the National Register of Historic Places in 2017.

The Genesee County Savings Bank was founded in 1872. In 1915, the bank opened a new headquarters at the corner of Kearsley and Saginaw Streets. In 1916, the bank consolidated some business aspects with the First National Bank of Flint. Due to Flint's booming economy, both banks were outgrowing their headquarters, and in 1919, Genesee County Savings Bank constructed this new building only a block from their old headquarters. The building was designed by Hodgson Brothers of New York City. Over the rest of the 1920s, the bank grew tremendously, and in 1957 merged with Merchants & Mechanics Bank to form Genesee Merchants Bank & Trust Co. The bank moved its headquarters to Genesee Towers in 1968.

As of 2017, the building was long vacant, and Uptown Development Corporation planned on redeveloping the building into a 100-room hotel. Renovation began in 2019, and was completed in 2020. The building is now home to the Downtown Flint Hilton Garden Inn, an Italian American restaurant, a coffee shop, and a rooftop bar.

== Description ==
The Genesee County Savings Bank is an eleven story building with a limestone exterior, located on a lot on the corner of Saginaw and Kearsley. Multiple cornices run around he building, emphasizing its length. The upper floors contain large windows to let natural light into the interior. The top two floors consisted of executive offices, with a colonnade running around the building. Above these is a deep cornice. The lower levels of the Saginaw Street façade appear to have been remodeled in an Art Modern style, inconsistent with the Kearsley Street façade.
