= Woodrow Stanley =

American politician (1950–2022)

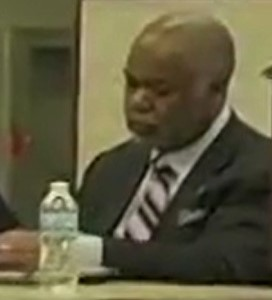
- Stanley in 2017

Member of the Michigan House of Representatives from the 34th district
- In office January 1, 2009 – December 31, 2014
- Preceded by: Brenda Clack
- Succeeded by: Sheldon Neeley

Chairman of the Genesee County Board of Commissioners
- In office 2008–2009

Member of the Genesee County Board of Commissioners from the 2nd district
- In office 2004–2009
- Succeeded by: Brenda Clack

89th Mayor of the City of Flint
- In office 1991 – March 5, 2002
- Preceded by: Matthew S. Collier
- Succeeded by: James W. Rutherford

Member of the Flint City Council
- In office 1983–1991
- Constituency: 2nd ward

Personal details
- Born: June 12, 1950 Schlater, Mississippi, U.S.
- Died: February 15, 2022 (aged 71) Flint, Michigan, U.S.
- Party: Democratic
- Spouse: Reta
- Children: 2
- Education: Mott Community College; University of Michigan-Flint

Woodrow Stanley (June 12, 1950 – February 15, 2022) was an American Democratic Party politician. He was mayor of Flint, Michigan from 1991 until his recall in 2002, and was a member of the Michigan House of Representatives from District 34 from 2009 to 2014.

== Early life ==
Stanley was born in Schlater, Mississippi, on June 12, 1950. He attended and graduated from Mott Community College. He then attended University of Michigan-Flint earning a bachelor's degree in political science. At University of Michigan-Flint, he had done additional course work towards a Masters of Public Administration.

== Political career ==
In 1983, Stanley was appointed to the Flint City Council representing the 2nd ward being reelected until his election to the office of Mayor of the City of Flint defeating the incumbent Matthew S. Collier. Stanley was elected to three terms as Mayor defeating (in order) future mayor Don Williamson (1995) and City Councilor Scott Kincaid (1999). He was recalled in 2002 due to the city's shaky financial condition and a state appointed Financial Manager was appointed after he left office. In 2004, Stanley was elected to the Genesee County Board of Commissioners, 2nd District. In his second term as Commissioner, Stanley was selected to be chairman of the Board of Commissioners. In November 2008, Stanley was elected to the Michigan House of Representatives from the 34th District.

== Personal life and death ==
Stanley died at Hurley Medical Center in Flint on February 15, 2022, at the age of 71.

Stanley is the grandfather of basketball standout, John "Trey" McKenney III.

== Electoral history ==
Mayoral Elections Results

1991	25,946	Matt Collier	17,686
1995	21,687	Don Williamson	9,168
1999	17,224	Scott Kincaid	16,393
2002	12,336	Recall	15,863

State Representative Election Results

Election Year	Votes	Opponent's Votes	Opponent
2008	26,867	4,973	Adam Ford (R)
2010	13,379	2,711	Bruce Rogers (R)

Political offices
Preceded by Matthew S. Collier	Mayor of Flint; 1991–2002	Succeeded by Darnell Earley, temporary (City Administrator)
