= Government of Flint, Michigan =

American municipal government

The City of Flint has operated under at least four charters (1855, 1888, 1929, 1974). The City is currently run under its 2017 charter that gives the city a Strong Mayor form of government. It is also instituted the appointed independent office of Ombudsman, while the city clerk is solely appointed by the City Council. The City Council is composed of members elected from the city's nine wards.

The city was under the supervision of a state-appointed Receivership Transition Advisory Board from 2015 to January 2019. The Receivership Transition Advisory Board had to review and rule on all financial matters approved by the city council and mayor.

In June 2018, an Administrative Hearings Bureau, or Blight Hearings Bureau, was started through a grant to handle blight hearings generated from blight citations given by the city's Blight Elimination Division. Attorney T.W. Feaster was appointed the first administrative hearing officer of the bureau. There were a backlog since 2013 of about 7,000 complaints.

== Other principal officers ==
See Also Mayor of the City of Flint, Michigan

Year	Recorders	Treasurers	Marshals
1855	Levi Walker	Elihu F. Frary	Cornelius Roosevelt
1856	Chas. B. Higgins	John C. Griswold	Joshua Vose
1857	M.L. Higgins	George F. Hood	Nathaniel Dodge
1858	Charles Hascall	George F. Hood	Cyrus H. Golf
1859	Charles Hascall	George F. Hood	Cyrus H. Golf
1860	Lewis G. Bickford	John A. Kline	George Andrews
1861	L.R. Buckingham	John A. Kline	J.A. Owens
1862	Julius Brouseau	John A. Kline	J.A. Owens
1863	H. R. Lovell	Anson S. Withee	J.D. Morehouse
1864	Alvin T. Crossman	Anson S. Withee	L.G. Buckingham
1865	Alvin T. Crossman	Anson S. Withee	J.D. Morehouse
1866	Alvin T. Crossman	William W. Barnes	J.D. Morehouse
1867	George R. Gold	William W. Barnes	John S. Freeman
1868	George R. Gold	William W. Barnes	John S. Freeman
1869	Anson S. Withee	William W. Barnes	William A. Miller
1870	Anson S. Withee	William W. Barnes	William A. Miller
1871	Chas. E. McAlester	William W. Barnes	Samuel B. Wicks
1872	Francis H. Rankin, Sr.	William W. Barnes	Samuel B. Wicks
1873	Solomon V. Hakes	William W. Barnes	Samuel B. Wicks
1874	Francis H. Rankin, Sr.	William W. Barnes	Samuel B. Wicks
1875	Francis H. Rankin, Sr.	William W. Barnes	Samuel B. Wicks
1876	Francis H. Rankin, Sr.	William W. Barnes	Samuel B. Wicks
Year	City Clerk•	Treasurers	Marshals
1877	Francis H. Rankin, Sr.	Charles C. Beahan	Samuel B. Wicks
1878	Francis H. Rankin, Sr.	Charles C. Beahan	Michael Doran
1879	J.B.F. Curtis	Jared Van Vleet	Michael Doran

•In 1876, the office of City Recorder was abolished and replaced with a city council appointed city clerk.

=== 1929 Charter ===
In 1929, the city adopted a new city charter with a council-manager form of government. In 1935, the city residents approved a charter amendment establishing the Civil Service Commission. The three-member Civil Service Commission had complete control over all personal matters leaving the city manager powerless to hire and fire. The Commission powers were reduced in the 1974 charter.

Year	City Manager	Deputy City Manager	Clerk
1963—1965		James W. Rutherford	
12/1971-4/1974	Brian Rapp		

=== Emergency manager ===
Term	Manager	Governor
Jul 2002 - Jun 2004	Ed Kurtz	John Engler
Dec 2011 - Aug 2012	Michael Brown	Rick Snyder
Aug 2012 - July 2013	Ed Kurtz	Rick Snyder
July 2013 - October 2013	Michael Brown	Rick Snyder
October 2013 - January 2015	Darnell Earley	Rick Snyder
January 2015–April 30, 2015	Jerry Ambrose	Rick Snyder

== Ward officers ==
	Street Commissioners				Assessors			
Year	1st	2nd	3rd	4th	1st	2nd	3rd	4th
1855	William Moon	William Eddy	John C. Griswold		Ashael Fuller	William Hamilton	David Foot	
1856	Thomas McElhany	George Andrews	James McAlester					
1857	William Baker	John A. Kline	John W. Palmer					
1858	John S. Ryno	Benjamin Pearson	Chas. H. Cudney					
1859	John S. Ryno	Elijah Drake	Chas. H. Cudney					
1860	Benjamin F. Golf	William Miller	Chas. H. Cudney					
1861	L. Bradford	S. C. Smith	William Bloomer					
1862	A.M. Hurd	L. Buckingham	Josiah Pratt					
1863	A.M. Hurd	L. H. Roberts	James D. Haight					
1864	David Watson	Theo. Simons	L. Buckingham					
1865	David Watson	Theo. Simons	L. Buckingham					
1866	William W. Joyner	Leonard Weason	Jacob B. Covert					
1867	William W. Joyner	Orson B. Gibson	Edmond Curtis					
1868	William O. Bassett	Orson B. Gibson	William Boomer					
1869	Jno. C. Clement	Josiah Pratt	Josiah Pratt (?)					
1870	Robert W. Dullam	L. H. Robert	Silas Austin					
1871	Robert Patrick, Sr.	L. H. Robert	Almon Reynolds	George Stanard				
1872	Robert Patrick, Sr.	S. B. Wicks	Almon Reynolds	Henry Stanley				
1873	Robert Patrick, Sr.	Edmond Curtis	L. Buckingham	Henry Thayer				
1874	Robert Patrick, Sr.	Edmond Curtis	Josiah Pratt	Henry Thayer				
1875	Robert Patrick, Sr.	Edmond Curtis	Josiah Pratt	John Becker				
1876	John Andrews	Edmond Curtis	Augustus Root	John Becker				
1877	John Andrews	Edmond Curtis	John C. Dayton	D. C. Andrews				
1878	Thomas Sullivan	Edmond Curtis	John C. Dayton	M. H. White				
1879	Thomas Sullivan	Alfred Ingalls	John C. Dayton	William Pidd				

== Council ==
=== 1855 Charter ===
Alderman		Wards							
Council	Years	1st		2nd		3rd		4th	
1st	1855	J.W. Armstrong	George W. Dewey	Benjamin Pearson	David Mather	William M. Fenton	Alvin T. Crosman		
2nd	1856	H. W. Wood	? (George W. Dewey)	Charles Rice	? (David Mather)	Henry Higgins	? (Alvin T. Crosman)		
3rd	1857	? (H. W. Wood)	C.S. Payne	? (Charles Rice); Lewis Walker†	Samuel N. Warren	? (Henry Higgins)	George W. Fish		
4th	1858	Jno. C. Allen	C.S. Payne	Samuel B. Wicks	Samuel N. Warren	G.W. Skidmore	George W. Fish		
5th	1859	Jno. C. Allen	C.S. Payne	Samuel B. Wicks	Samuel N. Warren	J. Skidmore	George W. Fish		
6th	1861	? (Jno. C. Allen)	Oscar Adams	? (Samuel B. Wicks)	William Hamilton	? (J. Skidmore)	William Patterson		
7th	1861	Alexander McFarland	? (Oscar Adams)	Edward C. Turner	? (William Hamilton)	William Clark	? (William Patterson)		
8th	1862	? (Alexander McFarland)	David Spencer Fox	? (Edward C. Turner)	William Hamilton	? (William Clark)	Paul H. Stewart		
9th	1863	O.F. Forsyth	David Spencer Fox	Edward C. Turner	I. N. Eldridge	David Foote	Paul H. Stewart		
10th	1864	O.F. Forsyth	William Stevenson	Edward C. Turner	I. N. Eldridge	David Foote	Hiram Parsell		
11th	1865	George H. Durand	William Stevenson	Edward C. Turner	I. N. Eldridge	David Foote	Hiram Parsell		
12th	1865	George H. Durand	William Stevenson	Edward C. Turner	L.H. Roberts	David Foote	Hiram Parsell		
13th	1866	George H. Durand	John Hawley	I. N. Eldridge	L.H. Roberts	David Foote	Sumner Howard		
14th	1867	George H. Durand	Abner Randall	I. N. Eldridge	William Hamilton	Charles Smith	Sumner Howard		
15th	1868	George H. Durand	Abner Randall	Orson B. Gibson	William Hamilton	Charles Smith	Sumner Howard		
16th	1869	George H. Durand	Abner Randall	F.W. Judd	Orson B. Gibson	F.H. Pierce	Sumner Howard		
17th	1870	M.S. Elmore	Abner Randall	F.W. Judd	Wilson S. Tousey	F.H. Pierce	W. O'Donoughue		
18th	1871	M.S. Elmore	Damon Stewart	John Willett	Wilson S. Tousey	W.Buckingham	W. O'Donoughue	J.R. Chambers	Chas. D. Smith
19th	1872	Samuel C. Randall	William Dullam	John Willett	J.B.F. Curtis	Edward B. Clapp	Josiah W. Begole	James Williams	Chas. D. Smith
20th	1873	Samuel C. Randall	Benj. Cotharin	H.C. Spencer	J.B.F. Curtis	P. Cleveland, Jr.	Josiah W. Begole	James Williams	Chas. D. Smith
21st	1874	Samuel C. Randall	Benj. Cotharin	H.C. Spencer	J.B.F. Curtis	P. Cleveland, Jr.	William R. Morse	James Williams	Chas. D. Smith
22nd	1875	Samuel C. Randall	Thomas Page	Williams Fobes	J.B.F. Curtis	P. Cleveland, Jr.	William R. Morse	James Williams	Chris Becker
23rd	1876	Chas. A. Mason	Thomas Page	Williams Fobes	J.B.F. Curtis	P. Cleveland, Jr.	Henry Brown	Chas. D. Smith	Chris Becker
24th	1877	Chas. A. Mason	Thomas Page	Andrew J. Ward	J.B.F. Curtis	William A. Atwood	William A. Burr	Chas. D. Smith	J. Zimmerman
25th	1878	Chas. A. Mason	Thomas Page	Andrew J. Ward	S.N. Androus	William A. Atwood	Henry C. Walker	Jos. M. Corkey	J. Zimmerman
26th	1879	George L. Caldwell	? (Thomas Page)	Andrew J. Ward	? (S.N. Androus)	? (William A. Atwood)	Henry C. Walker	? (Jos. M. Corkey)	A.R. Michaels

† To fill vacancy

=== 1974 Charter ===
Councilor		Wards								
Council	Years	1st	2nd	3rd	4th	5th	6th	7th	8th	9th
	1974 to 1983	John W. Northrup (ward unknown)								
	1983 to 1985	John W. Northrup (ward unknown)						Jack Minore		
	1985-1991	John W. Northrup (ward unknown)						Jack Minore		Scott Kincaid
	1991-January 1997	John W. Northrup (ward unknown)			Peggy R. Cook			Jack Minore		Scott Kincaid
	January 1997 to 1998				Peggy R. Cook			Jack Minore		Scott Kincaid
	1998 to 2004				Peggy R. Cook					Scott Kincaid
	2004 to 2005				Joshua Freeman					Scott Kincaid
	2005–2007	Darryl Buchanan	Jackie Poplar	Kerry Nelson	Sandy Hill	Carolyn Sims	Sheldon Neeley	Jim Ananich	Ehren Gonzales	Scott Kincaid
	2007–2009	Delrico Loyd	Jackie Poplar	Kerry Nelson	Sandy Hill	Carolyn Sims	Sheldon Neeley	Jim Ananich	Ehren Gonzales	Scott Kincaid
	2009–2013	Delrico Loyd	Jacqueline Poplar	Bryant Nolden	Joshua Freeman	Bernard Lawler	Sheldon Neeley	Dale Weighill	Michael Sarginson	Scott Kincaid
	2013-2017	Eric Mays	Jacqueline Poplar	Bryant Nolden (2013-1/2015; VP 2013-2014); Kerry Nelson, President (2015-2016)	Joshua Freeman (13-1/2016), president (2014-2015); Kate Fields (2016-2017)	Wantwaz Davis, Vice President (2014-2015)	Herbert Winfrey	Monica Galloway	Vicki VanBuren, Vice President (2015-2016)	Scott Kincaid, president (2013-2014)
	January 2018 to 2021	Eric Mays	Maurice Davis	Santino Guerra	Kate Fields	Jerri Winfrey-Carter	Herbert Winfrey	Monica Galloway	Allan Griggs	Eva Worthing
	January 2022 to 2025	Eric Mays (d. Feb. 24, 2024) Leon El-Alamin (app. Mar. 25, 2024)	Ladel Lewis	Quincy Murphy (d. Sept. 29, 2024) Lashawn Johnson (elected Aug. 13, 2025)	Judy Priestley	Jerri Winfrey-Carter	Tonya Burns	Allie Herkenroder (res. Jul. 1, 2023) Candice Mushatt (app. Jul. 26, 2023)	Dennis Pfeiffer	Eva Worthing (recalled 2023, dropped out of May 2024 special election) Jonathan Jarrett (elec. May 2024)

President and vice president are selected in November. The city council originally faced a 2 month deadlock beginning in November 2025 but in February 2026, the council elected 7th Ward Councilwoman Candice Mushatt as the new council president and 9th Ward Councilman Jonathan Jarret as the council vice president.

== Receivership Transition Advisory Board ==
The Receivership Transition Advisory Board was appointed by Governor Snyder after the city exited direct control of the emergency manager in its second Financial emergency in Michigan.

member	position	start	end
Fred Headen	chair	April 30, 2015	
Brian Larkin		April 30, 2015	October 28, 2015
David McGhee		April 30, 2015	
Robert McMahan		April 30, 2015	January 20, 2016
Beverly Walker-Griffea		April 30, 2015	
Mike Finney		January 19, 2016	May 26, 2017
Michael Townsend		January 21, 2016	May 26, 2017
Paul Newman		May 26, 2017	
William Tarver		May 26, 2017	

== Charter Review Commission ==
member 1974	position
Carl L. Bekofske	Chairman
Leroy Nichols	Vice Chairman
Bob Jackson	
John H. West
Joseph Conroy
Charles A. Greene
James P. Hanley
Philip D. Marvin
Banius C. Hedrick

member 2015	position	term
John D. Cherry	Vice chair	May 18, 2015 - May 18, 2018
Brian Larkin		May 18, 2015 - October 28, 2015
Cleora Magee	chair	May 18, 2015 - May 18, 2018
Victoria McKenze		May 18, 2015 - May 18, 2018
Charles Metcalfe		May 18, 2015 - May 18, 2018
Heidi Phaneuf		May 18, 2015 - May 18, 2018
James Richardson		May 18, 2015 - May 18, 2018
Marsha Wesley		May 18, 2015 - May 18, 2018
Barry Williams		May 18, 2015 - May 18, 2018
Quincy Murphy	December 17, 2015 - May 18, 2018	

== Supervisors ==
Supervisors represented the City on the Genesee County, Michigan Board of Supervisors.

Year	1st	2nd	3rd	4th
1855	Charles N. Beecher			
1856	Charles N. Beecher			
1857	George S. Hopkins			
1858	Francis Baker	William Lyons	George S. Hopkins	
1859	Francis Baker	William Lyons	George S. Hopkins	
1860	W. O'Donoughue	Samuel N. Warren	L.G. Buckingham	
1861	D.S. Freeman	Samuel N. Warren	George S. Hopkins	
1862	John C. Clement	Samuel N. Warren	George S. Hopkins	
1863	John C. Clement	Samuel N. Warren	George S. Hopkins	
1864	John C. Clement	Samuel N. Warren	P.H. Stewart	
1865	John C. Clement	Samuel N. Warren	Josiah W. Begole	
1866	John C. Clement	Samuel N. Warren	Josiah W. Begole	
1867	John C. Clement	Samuel N. Warren	Paul H. Stewart	
1868	John C. Clement	Samuel N. Warren	William Paterson	
1869	Andrew B. Chapin	Samuel N. Warren	Paul H. Stewart	
1870	Andrew B. Chapin	Samuel N. Warren	Paul H. Stewart	
1871	George E. Newall	Samuel N. Warren	Paul H. Stewart	George W. Thayer
1872	George E. Newall	Cornelius Roosevelt	Paul H. Stewart	George L. Walker
1873	George E. Newall	Cornelius Roosevelt	Paul H. Stewart	George L. Walker
1874	George E. Newall	Cornelius Roosevelt	John Algoe	George L. Walker
1875	George E. Newall	S. Mathewson	Ephraim S. Williams	George L. Walker
1876	George E. Newall	S. Mathewson	James Van Vleet	George L. Walker
1877	D.S. Freeman	S. Mathewson	James Van Vleet	George L. Walker
1878	L.C. Witney	S. Mathewson	James Van Vleet	Albert Crosby
1879	L.C. Witney	S. Mathewson	James Van Vleet	Albert Crosby

== Ombudsman ==
The City Ombudsman is a charter independent office of the city appointed by the City Council in a 2/3 votes to a seven-year term. A police ombudsman, Richard Dicks, predated the current charter position and was appointed in 1969.

Term	Office holder	notes
12/26/75-1978	Joe Dupcza	
05/15/78-07/21/87	James Ananich	
07/22/87-07/21/94	Terry Bankert	
08/17/94-04/08/96	Darryl Buchanan	He was removed from office by the City Council but was returned to office after a lawsuit and finished his term.
01/1999-05/8/2006	Jessie Binion	
05/8/2006-12/2/2011	Brenda L. Purifoy	Removed from office by the Emergency Manager Michael Brown.
