= Francis H. Rankin =

Francis H. Rankin may refer to:

- Francis H. Rankin Jr. (1854–1925), American politician and publisher in Michigan
- Francis H. Rankin Sr. (1818–1900), his father, American politician and publisher in Michigan
