= Education Achievement Authority =

School district in Michigan

Interlocal agreement school district overview
- Formed: June 2011
- Type: board
- Minister responsible: Roy Roberts, EAA Executive Committee Chair
- Interlocal agreement school district executive: Veronica Conforme, chancellor
- Parent interlocal agreement school district: Eastern Michigan University; Detroit Public Schools
- Child interlocal agreement school district: Education Achievement System
- Key document: EMU-Detroit Public Schools Agreement
- Website: Official website

The Education Achievement Authority (EAA or Authority) was the governing body of the Education Achievement System (EAS or System), a Michigan statewide school system for failing schools. It was discontinued in 2017 and the schools were returned to the Detroit Public Schools.

The office of the State Superintendent or an Emergency Manager of a school district may transfer a failing school from its district into the System that is not under an approved redesign plan.

== History ==
Michigan Governor Rick Snyder created the authority in June 2011 to take over and turn around failing schools.

On August 26, 2011, the EAA Executive Committee went into executive session to discuss hiring John Covington as chancellor. In the summer of 2011, John Covington was appointed chancellor of the Authority school system. Pursuant to a complaint, on October 28 Judge Robert Colombo ruled them in violation of Open Meetings Act for failing to have a 2/3 vote to enter the executive session of August 26.

Curt Guyette of the Metro Times wrote that "The EAA has been mired in controversy since its inception. "

In December 2011, Covington held meetings in the Detroit area to explain the Authority, take input about system including whether the EAA should start with more than Detroit Public Schools.

The Authority began taking over Detroit schools in September 2012. Covington resigned as chancellor on July 13, 2014, with an interim, Veronica Conforme, appointed the next day. After the last remaining candidate dropped out on November 4, 2014, Conforme was named chancellor the next day.

By 2014 many students who formerly went to EAA schools moved back to Detroit Public Schools (DPS) campuses, and the EAA campuses had significant declines in enrollment. Veronica Conforme, the EAA chancellor, announced that she will give autonomy to individual campuses in an effort to improve the academics and public image of the EAA.

In December 2014 Eastern Michigan University put the EAA on notice, asking it to improve.

As of 2015 the EAA did not spend a $11.5 million federal grant it received as part of the Teacher Incentive Fund (TIF).

In February 2016 the Eastern Michigan University Board of Regents submitted notice to withdraw from the Achievement Authority in June 2017. Following the notice Michigan Senate leaders announced they would be working to dismantle the EAA as part of a Detroit Public Schools support package.

== Operations ==
The EAA students used Buzz, an educational software program developed by Agilix Labs that had its testing phases during the EAA instruction. The program used software made by the School Improvement Network (SINET).

As of 2012, 25% of the teachers were from Teach for America.

== Schools ==
As of 2016 the following schools are controlled by the EAA:

Elementary and middle schools:

- Mary M. Bethune Elementary/Middle School
- Burns Elementary/Middle School
- Law Academy
- Nolan Elementary/Middle School
- Phoenix Elementary/Middle School
- Brenda Scott Elementary/Middle School

High schools:

- Central Collegiate Academy
- Denby High School
- Henry Ford High School
- Mumford High School
- Pershing High School
- Southeastern High School

Charter schools:

- Murphy Performance Academy
- Stewart Performance Academy
- Trix Performance Academy

== Authority Board ==
as of 2011

| Member | representing | position |
|---|---|---|
| Roy Roberts | Detroit Public Schools | Chair; Executive Committee 2 year Executive Committee Chair |
| Sharlonda Buckman | Detroit Public Schools | f |
| Mike Morris | Eastern Michigan University | executive committee 4 year |
| Mary Tender-Lang | Eastern Michigan University | |
| Mike Duggan | Governor Snyder | executive committee 3 year |
| Carol A. Goss | Governor Snyder | |
| Reverend Dr. Joseph Ralph Jordan | Governor Snyder | |
| Mark A. Murray | Governor Snyder | executive committee 1 year |
| Dr. William F. Pickard | Governor Snyder | executive committee 2 year |
| Shirley Stancato | Governor Snyder | |
| Judith Kaye Berry | Governor Snyder | |

== See also ==
- Financial emergency in Michigan
