= Financial emergency in Michigan =

Financial emergency is a state of receivership for the State of Michigan's local governments.

== History ==
In 1986 a state court appointed a receiver, Louis Schimmel, for the city of Ecorse which had a $6 million deficit. The court appointed receivership lasted until 1990.

The financial emergency status, along with the Emergency Financial Manager (EFM) position, was first created in Public Act 101 of 1988 for the specific emergency in Hamtramck. Public Act 101 was amended by Public Act 72 of 1990, allowing an Emergency Financial Manager to be appointed for any local governmental unit. PA 72 in turn was replaced by Public Act 4 of 2011, which renamed the position to Emergency Manager (EM) and gave the Manager additional authority.

When the Referendum petitions were approved by the Michigan State Board of Canvassers on August 8, 2012, under orders from the Michigan Supreme Court, PA 4 was suspended and the previous version, PA 72, was reinstated. All current EM except for Michael Brown in Flint were reappointed as EFM by the Local Emergency Financial Assistance Loan Board. Brown was previously a Flint City employee in the past five years and was not eligible under PA 72 to be an EFM. The Sugar Law Center filed to challenge PA 4 and PA 72. PA 4 was repealed by Michigan voters in the 2012 general election, and the Michigan Legislature subsequently passed Public Act 436 of 2012 to replace the revived Public Act 72.

On May 1, 2013, the City of Ecorse was moved from under an emergency manager to a transition advisory board, which includes the previous emergency manager. On July 2, a school district dissolution provision was passed into law allowing financially struggling school districts to be dissolved. On July 18 with the Governor's authorization, Detroit's manager filed Chapter 9 bankruptcy. In August, a transition advisory board was appointed for the City of Pontiac which included the then emergency manager.

For the City of Detroit, the state legislature passed a separate law forming a financial review commission to exercise financial check on city government as it exited bankruptcy and emergency management.

As of June 27, 2018, there are no Emergency Managers in Michigan for the first time since 2000.

== Procedure ==
=== Original law ===
Public Act 101 of 1988 provided certain triggers for an initial review which included: failure to pay debts, failure to pay employee salaries, a request by local residents or officials, or request by a state legislator or state treasurer. If the review found that a financial emergency existed, the Local Emergency Financial Assistance Loan Board would make the appointment of an emergency financial manager for the governmental unit. Public Act 72 of 1990 broadened the Emergency Financial Manager powers to handle all matters of finances of the city and provided a statute to also apply to public school districts.

=== Public Act 4 of 2011 ===
Public Act 4 amended and expanded the procedure. The Michigan Department of Treasury would conduct a preliminary examination of troubled local governments. If "probable financial stress" were found, a financial review would be ordered. The Governor of Michigan and other officials would appoint the eight members of a financial review panel, which could report back to the Governor indicating that the local government is in "mild financial stress, severe financial stress or a financial emergency" within 60 days. If a financial emergency existed but local officials had a viable plan to correct the situation, then the panel could recommend a consent agreement. Otherwise, the panel could recommend an emergency manager to take control of the local government. The Governor was given 10 days after the panel reported its findings to choose an option. The local government then had seven days to request a hearing by the Governor or his designee to appeal the decision. Local governments were required to pay the emergency manager.

=== Public Act 436 of 2012 ===
The Local Financial Stability and Choice Act of 2012 includes several triggers for a preliminary review:

- board requesting a review via resolution,
- local petition of 5 percent of gubernatorial election voters requesting one,
- creditor's written request,
- missed payroll,
- missed pension payments,
- deficit-elimination plan breach or lack of such a plan within 30 days after its due day,
- a legislative request.

As with the previous law, various reviews are taken before any actions are made. The State Financial Authority, either the State Treasurer or Superintendent of Public Instruction, must provide an interim report within 20 days of creating a preliminary review to the local government. Then within 30 days, they must provide a final report to the Local Emergency Financial Assistance Review Board (ELB). If the review finds a financial emergency exists, the local government is given four different choices: a consent agreement, chapter 9 bankruptcy, mediation or emergency manager. Under this law, the State government pays the manager's pay under this version. If an emergency manager is appointed, when the manager files his plan with the state, the local governing board may propose an alternative plan which the Local Emergency Financial Board will select which version the manager will implement. After one year, the manager may be removed by a 2/3 vote of the governing body.

A "transition advisory board" may be appointed after an emergency manager leaves a governmental unit and is to oversee the unit's finances. The law also allows the governor to impose a model charter or revise the existing one before the municipality exits receivership.

== School district dissolution ==
PA 72 provided statute for school districts to also come under Emergency Financial Manager. These powers were further extended under Public Act 10 of 1999, a separate state control arrangement, under which Detroit Public Schools operated from 1999 through 2005 during the John Engler administration for academic reasons. At the time the state assumed control in 1999, Detroit Public Schools had a budget surplus of nearly $115 million. At the end of the 2005 school year, the final year of the state's initial period controlling Detroit Public Schools, the district had accumulated a $31 million deficit.

Detroit Public Schools came under a financial emergency in 2009 under PA 72. With the expansion of emergency manager powers with PA 436, other schools have come under emergency management including school districts in the City of Muskegon Heights and City of Highland Park.

On July 2, 2013, a school district dissolution provision was passed into law allowing school districts that are financially struggling to be dissolved by the state treasurer and state superintendent with the intermediate school district splitting up the district's territory between neighboring school districts. Dissolved school districts become a tax-collecting unit, under the intermediate school district's control, to pay off debts.

Dissolved school districts

- Buena Vista School District (Michigan), July 30, 2013
- Inkster Public Schools, July 25, 2013

== Local Emergency Financial Assistance Loan Board ==
The Local Emergency Financial Assistance Loan Board (ELB) is ex officio formed board consisting of the State Treasurer of Michigan, director of licensing and regulatory affairs and the Director of Technology, Management and Budget as members or their respective designees. The board selects the emergency manager and chooses between the emergency manager's cost-cutting plan and the local unit board's alternative plan. The ELB approves all major financial decisions over $10,000 while a municipality is under emergency management, including transfers of publicly owned assets.

== Emergency manager ==
An emergency manager, formerly an emergency financial manager, is an official appointed by the governor to take control of a local government under a financial emergency in the State of Michigan and is not the same as an emergency manager as defined by the International Association of Emergency Managers (IAEM) and the U.S. Department of Labor job classification. A manager temporarily supplants the governing body, chief executive officer, or chief administrative officer of the local government and has the authority to remove any of the unit's elected officials should they refuse to provide any information or assistance. Managers have complete control over the local unit with the ability to reduce pay, outsource work, reorganize departments and modify employee contracts. Emergency managers assigned to school districts may transfer failing schools to the Education Achievement Authority.

=== List of emergency managers ===
Local Government	Term	Manager	Governor
City of Allen Park	October 2012–September 2014	Joyce A. Parker	Rick Snyder
City of Lincoln Park	July 2014 - December 2015	Brad Coulter	Rick Snyder
City of Benton Harbor	Apr 2010 - Jan 2013	Joseph Harris	Jennifer Granholm
City of Benton Harbor	January 2013–March 2014	Tony Saunders	Rick Snyder
City of Detroit	March 2013– December 10, 2014	Kevyn Orr	Rick Snyder
City of Ecorse	Oct 2009 - Apr 2013	Joyce A. Parker	Jennifer Granholm
City of Flint	Jul 2002 - Jun 2004	Ed Kurtz	John Engler
City of Flint	Dec 2011 - Aug 2012	Michael Brown	Rick Snyder
City of Flint	Aug 2012 - July 2013	Ed Kurtz	Rick Snyder
City of Flint	July 2013 - October 2013	Michael Brown	Rick Snyder
City of Flint	October 2013 - January 2015	Darnell Earley	Rick Snyder
City of Flint	January 2015–April 30, 2015	Jerry Ambrose	Rick Snyder
Hamtramck City	1988-?		
Hamtramck City	December 2000- Feb 2007	Louis Schimmel	John Engler
Hamtramck City	July 2013 – Dec 2014	Cathy Square	Rick Snyder
City of Highland Park	Dec 2000 - Mar 2005	Ramona Henderson Pearson	John Engler
City of Highland Park	Mar 2005 - Apr 2009	Arthur Blackwell	Jennifer Granholm
City of Highland Park	Apr 2009 - Jul 2009	Robert Mason	Jennifer Granholm
City of Pontiac	Aug 2010 - Oct 2011	Michael Stampfler	Jennifer Granholm
City of Pontiac	Oct 2011 - August 2013	Louis Schimmel	Rick Snyder
Three Oaks Village	December 2008 - December 2009	Pam Amato	Jennifer Granholm
Detroit Public Schools	Mar 2009 - May 2011	Robert Bobb	Jennifer Granholm
Detroit Public Schools	May 2011 – January 2015	Roy Roberts	Rick Snyder
Detroit Public Schools	January 2015 - February 2016	Darnell Earley	Rick Snyder
Muskegon Heights School District	April 2012 - October 2016	Donald Weatherspoon	Rick Snyder
Highland Park Schools	Jan 2012– October 2012	Jack Martin	Rick Snyder
Highland Park Schools	October 2012 - February 2016	Donald Weatherspoon	Rick Snyder
Highland Park Schools	Feb 2016 - October 2016	Steve Schiller	Rick Snyder
Highland Park Schools	October 2016 - May 2018	Kevin Smith	Rick Snyder

== Other ==
- Bankruptcy
  - Detroit (in addition to emergency manager) (July 21, 2013-December 10, 2014)
- Consent agreements
  - Inkster, March 2012-
  - Detroit (March 2012- ) -August 8, 2012
  - Pontiac Public Schools
- Court order receivership
  - Ecorse (1986-1990)
- Financial review commission
  - Detroit
- Transition advisory board
  - Ecorse (May 1, 2013 – present)
  - City of Pontiac (August 2013 – present)
  - City of Allen Park (September 2014 – present)
  - City of Flint (April 30, 2015-January 11, 2019 )

== See also ==
- Chapter 9, Title 11, United States Code, a chapter of the United States Bankruptcy Code, available exclusively to municipalities, that assists them in the restructuring of debts.
- Education Achievement Authority, a Michigan statewide school system for failing schools
- Municipal Assistance Corporation, New York State receivership agencies
