= Senator Buttars =

Senator Buttars may refer to:

- Archibald Buttars (1838–1926), Michigan State Senate
- Chris Buttars (1942–2018), Utah State Senate
