= Arthur Jerome Eddy =

Modernist art collector, writer, and businessman

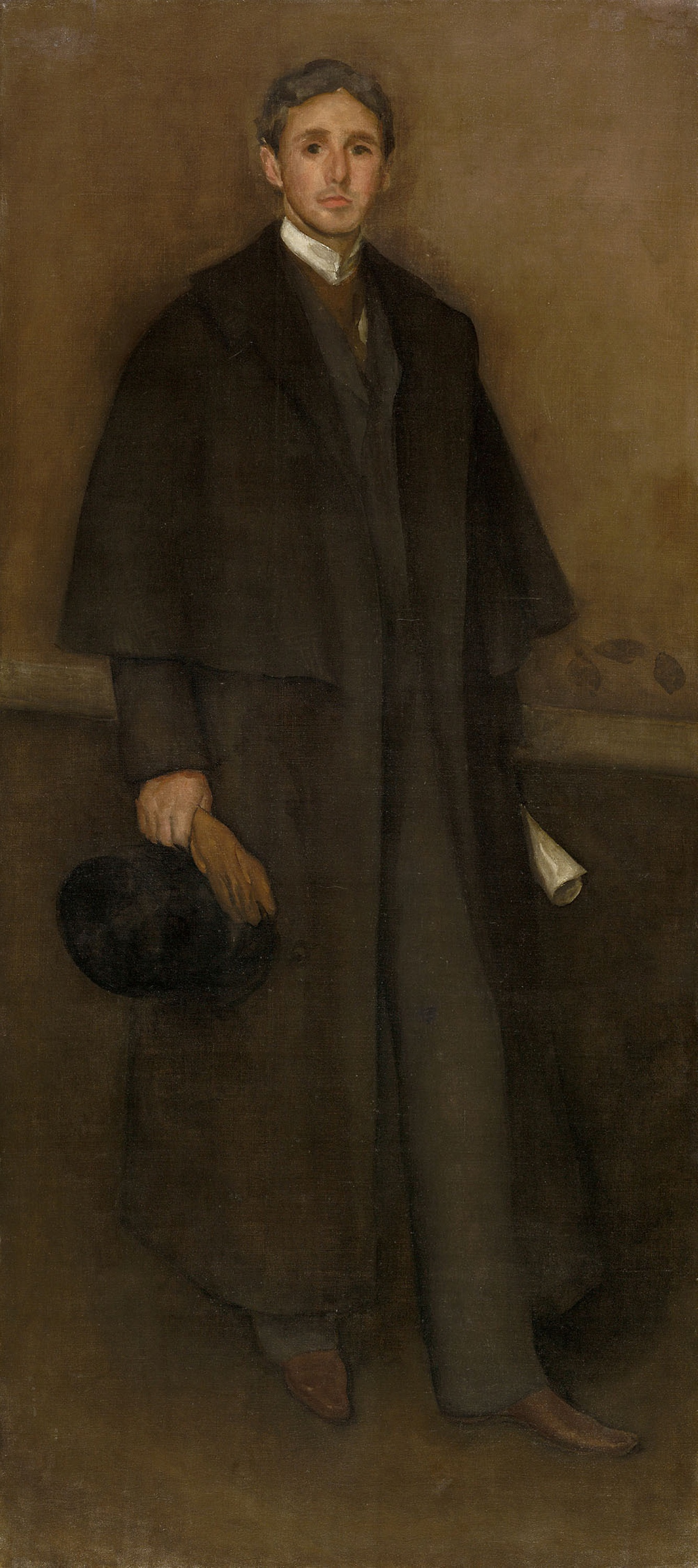
Arrangement in Flesh Colour and Brown: Portrait of Arthur J. Eddy by James McNeill Whistler (1894)

Arthur Jerome Eddy (November 5, 1859 – July 21, 1920, in New York City, New York) was an American lawyer, author, art collector, and a prominent member of the first generation of American Modern art collectors. His book Cubists and Post-Impressionism was the first American book promoting these new art movements and the work of Wassily Kandinsky. Eddy's collection was distinguished by the inclusion of German expressionists and Wassily Kandinsky.

Eddy was known for his support of the Armory Show, purchasing work from the show in New York and Chicago and lecturing on the art during the Chicago show. In 1931, a portion of Eddy's collection was donated by his widow and son to the Art Institute of Chicago as the "Arthur Jerome Eddy Memorial Collection" which is an important core of the museum's collection of Modern art.

== Early life and education ==
Eddy was born in Flint, Michigan, to Jerome Eddy, the city's mayor. His father purchased the Flint Michigan paper, the Genesee Democrat. After running the paper himself, Jerome Eddy turned over management of the paper to Arthur Jerome Eddy.

One source says that Eddy graduated from the "literary department" of Harvard University. A second source indicates that he "entered Harvard Law School in 1877 but in 1879 returned to be publisher of the Genesee Democrat newspaper. He continued studying law with a local expert. In 1888 he moved to Chicago to begin his legal career, passing the Illinois Bar in 1890."

Arthur J. Eddy married Lulu Crapo Orrell, a granddaughter of Michigan governor Henry H. Crapo and cousin of the founder of General Motors, William Crapo Durant. His son, Jerome Orrell Eddy, was born May 12, 1891, and died December 28, 1951.

== Business career ==
Eddy practiced corporate law with Wetten, Matthews & Pegler, which later became the firm of Eddy, Wetten & Pegler. Mr. Eddy was one of the driving forces in creating the National Carbon Company which combined multiple carbon companies into one company that controlled approximately 75% of the US carbon market in the world. Carbon was used to make numerous products related to the use of electricity. He helped organize American Steel Foundry Corporation, National Turbine Company, and American Linseed Oil Company. He helped established the Bridge Builder's Society.

== Writings ==
Eddy wrote on a variety of subjects and in various formats. These included 2000 Miles on an Automobile (travelog), Law of Combinations (economics), Tales of a Small Town (short stories), Ganton & Co. (a novel) and The Warning (a play). He wrote several very important books on art, including Delight, the Soul of Art, Recollections of James McNeill Whistler, and Cubists and Post Impressionism.

He wrote an article on tile roofs that appeared in Gustav Stickley's magazine, The Craftsman. He contributed poetry and edited a Chicago literary magazine, Contributors' Magazine, which was the self-published work of the Contributor's Club. Members of the club included Eugene Field, Harriet Monroe, George P. Upton, Potter Palmer, and John J. Glessner.

== Homes ==
Eddy resided in Chicago but maintained a second home, designed by Frederick Roehrig in Pasadena. The house was cited as "the most complete example of the California (Southern Californian!) interpretation of Arts and Crafts principles." William Le Baron Jenney wrote an article, "A Remarkable Dwelling," about the Eddy House in the May 1906 Inland Architect and News Record. An article about the house was published in The Craftsman magazine. The house was "one of the most important bungalow designs of the period, strongly influencing later ranch style houses throughout California and later the United States." The Pasadena house was torn down in 1973.

== Automobiles ==
Michigan roads are all bad, but some are worse than others.

— Arthur Jerome Eddy, 1902

Mr. Eddy was an early automobile enthusiast. The New York Times reported that he set a record in automobile travel by traveling 2900 miles in two months. The trip started in Chicago on August 1, 1901. He traveled to Boston and returned to Chicago on September 30, 1901. He wrote about this trip in his 1902 book Two Thousand Miles on an Automobile; Being a Desultory Narrative of a Trip Through New England, New York, Canada, and the West, under the pseudonym of "A. Chauffeur." He drove a Winton Motor Carriage Company automobile in the 1901 trip. In 1902, he drove a Panhard to Flint Michigan to visit family and gave Margery Durant, the daughter of William Crapo Durant, her first automobile ride. Her father, the future founder of General Motors, responded: "Margery, how could you, how could you, be so foolish as to risk your life in one of those things."

== Art collector and patron ==
His interest in art did not awaken until he saw the World Columbian Exposition in Chicago, where he was most taken with the work of James McNeill Whistler and Auguste Rodin. Eddy, who traveled to Paris in the middle of the 1890s, was portrayed by Whistler in the painting Arrangement in Flesh Color and Brown: Portrait of Arthur Jerome Eddy. Around the same time Rodin also sculpted a portrait bust of Eddy, bronze casts of which are in the Musée Rodin in Paris, the Art Institute of Chicago, and the Albuquerque Museum of Art and History. In 1902 his first book about art, titled Delight, the Soul of Art, was published. In the following year he published Recollections and impressions of James A. McNeill Whistler. Thus through 1912 he focused on the art of the late 19th century.

For Eddy, as for many Americans, the 1913 Armory Show proved a revelation of modern art. Fascinated by the efforts of these artists, he immediately began his collection of avant-garde art with the purchase of a Brâncuși sculpture and 25 paintings. "In New York, Eddy purchased 15 of the most radical works on display, including Marcel Duchamp's Portrait of Chess Players (1911) and The King and Queen Surrounded by Swift Nudes (1912), Albert Gleizes's Man on a Balcony (1912), and Francis Picabia's Dances at the Spring (1912). In Chicago, he purchased three additional paintings by the Portuguese artist Amadeo de Souza Cardoso, as well as three lithographs by Maurice Denis and four by Édouard Vuillard." On two occasions during the show, Mr. Eddy lectured on "Cubism" at the Art Institute of Chicago.

On trips to London and Germany he came to know of Wassily Kandinsky and by 1920 had bought four of his paintings. Kandinsky introduced Eddy to another artist in working in Munich at the time, Albert Bloch. Eddy would become Bloch's most important collector, owning over forty paintings and etchings. Eddy's collection in modern art would grow to over 100 works of art.

The year 1914 saw the publication of perhaps his most important writing, Cubists and Post-Impressionism, a large portion of which was based on information that Eddy obtained from the artists themselves. It is considered to be the first work published in the United States in which Modern Art was presented and explained sympathetically. Additionally it was the first adequate account of Kandinsky in America; the artist had been represented by only one painting in the Armory Show the year before.

In his last years of life Eddy shifted the focus of his collecting to the American moderns, including some paintings by artists such as Arthur Dove.

== Death ==
He died after surgery for acute appendicitis at Post Graduate Hospital in New York City.

In 1921, Louis Sullivan designed a "family memorial enclosure" with the "Dimensions: ca: 51' (diameter)" in Glenwood Cemetery in Flint Michigan which was not built.

== Memorial Collection ==
After his death in 1920, some of the collection was dispersed. The Art Institute of Chicago exhibited his collection September 19 to October 22, 1922. In 1931, his widow and son donated 20 paintings and 3 sculptures to the Art Institute of Chicago to form the Arthur Jerome Eddy Memorial Collection. as described below.

The collection includes 19th-century works:

- Édouard Manet – A Philosopher (Beggar with Oysters) (1865)
- Winslow Homer – Coast of Maine (1893)
- James Abbott McNeill Whistler – Portrait of Arthur Jerome Eddy (c. 1896)

The collection is noted for containing members of the German Der Blaue Reiter (The Blue Rider) movement:

- Gabriele Münter – Still Life with Queen (1912)
- Franz Marc – The Bewitched Mill (c. 1912)
- Wassily Kandinsky – Trojka (1911), Landscape with Two Poplars (1912), Improvisation with Green Center, No. 176 (1912) and Improvisation No. 30 (1913)

Further artists represented in the Art Institute's Eddy collection:

- Albert Bloch – Scene from a Pantomime (1914)
- Emilie Charmy – Landscape: L'Estaque (c. 1910), (Armory Show)
- André Derain – Forest at Martigues (c. 1908), (Armory Show)
- Amadeo de Souza Cardoso – Leap of the Rabbit (1911)(Armory Show), Marine Pont L'Abbe (1911), (Armory Show), and Stronghold (Armory Show – Chicago only)
- Maurice de Vlaminck – Rueil (c. 1912), (Armory Show – Chicago)
- André Dunoyer de Segonzac – The Pasture (c. 1912), (Armory Show)
- Robert Genin – Thirst (1913)
- Auguste Herbin – House and Flowering Cherry Trees: Hamburg
- Eugène Zak – The Shepard (Armory Show)

The sculpture in the collection are:

- Constantin Brâncuși – Sleeping Muse (1910), (Armory Show)
- Auguste Rodin – Mask of the Man with the Broken Nose (1864) and Arthur Jerome Eddy (Portrait Bust), (1898)

== Paintings from Eddy's collection ==
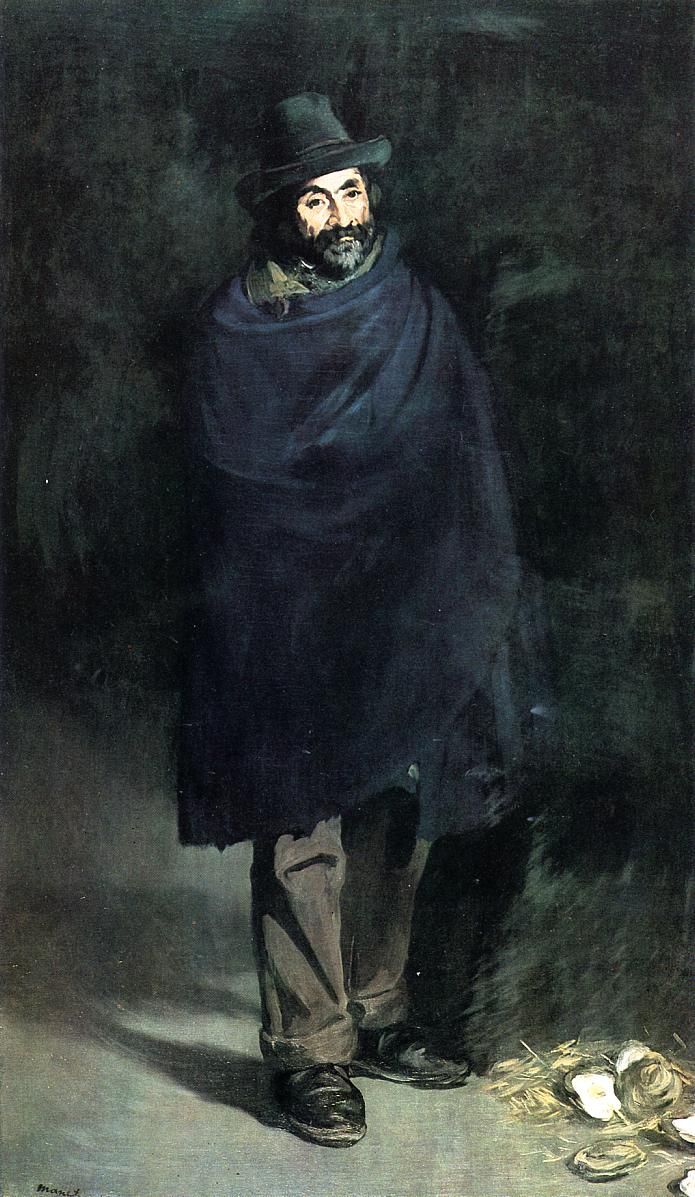
Édouard Manet:
A Philosopher (Beggar with Oysters)

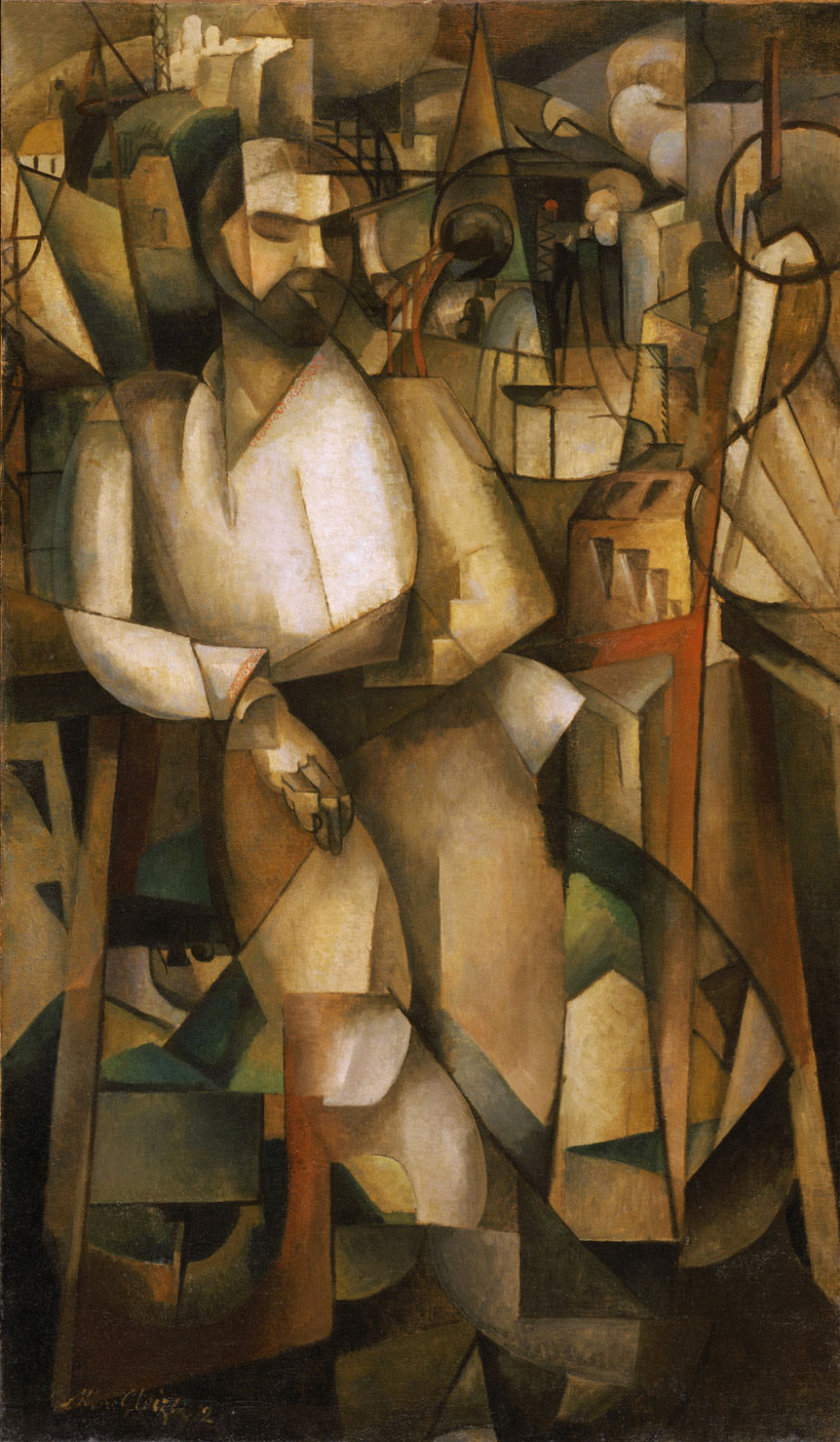
Albert Gleizes, 1912, L'Homme au Balcon, Man on a Balcony (Portrait of Dr. Théo Morinaud). Purchased from the Armory Show

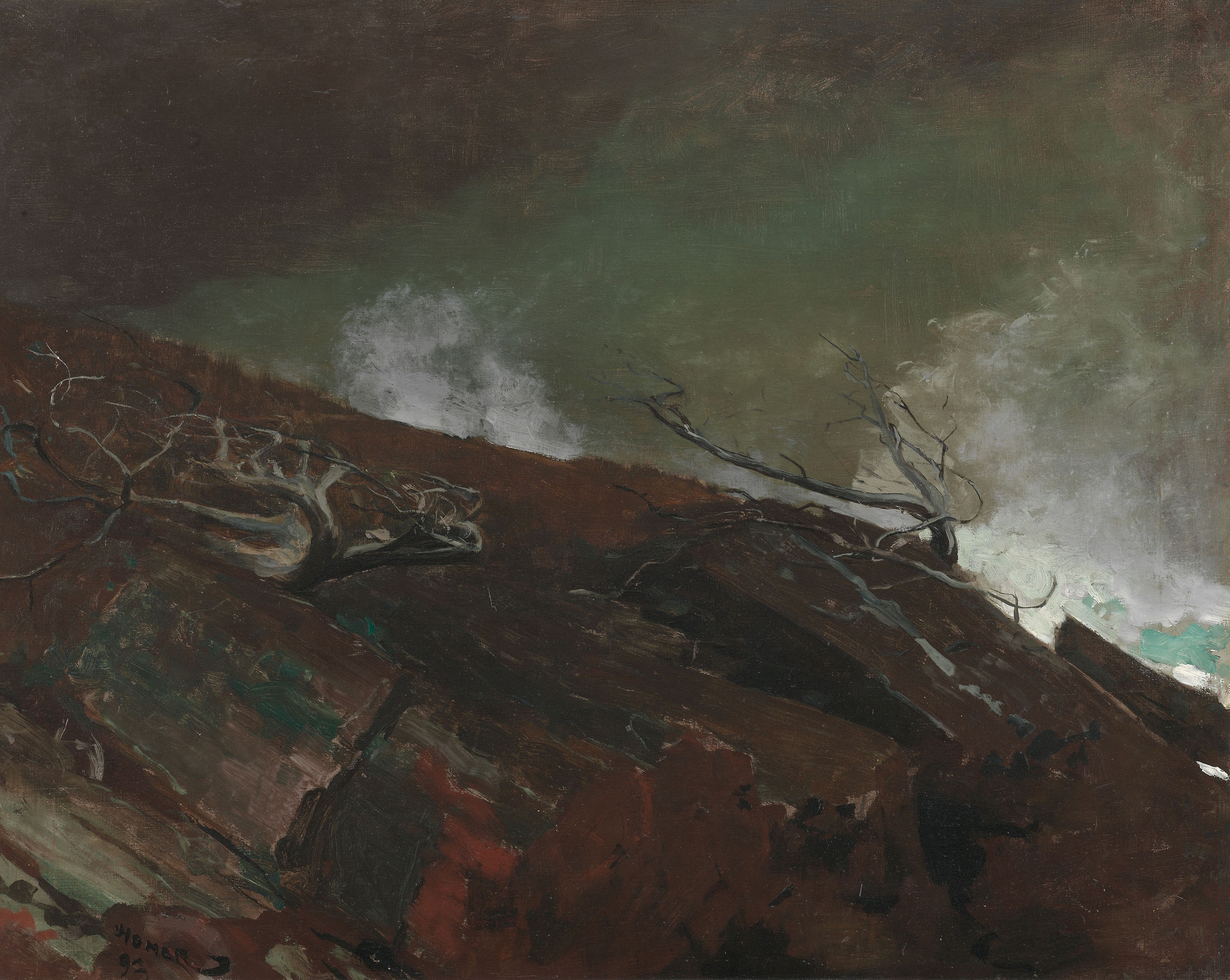
Winslow Homer:
Coast of Maine

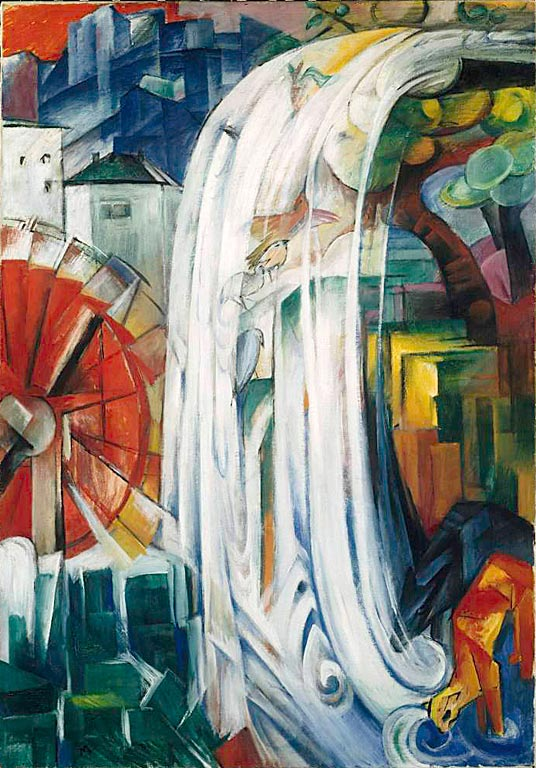
Franz Marc:
The Bewitched Mill

== Bibliography ==
- Come Let Us Reason Together: The Tariff, Facts and Figures for the Laborer, the Farmer, the Manufacturer. The Eddy printing and publishing house, Flint, Michigan, c. 1884
- A Plain Talk to Farmers about the Tariff. Flint, Michigan 1984
- The Farmer's Complete Encyclopedia: A compendium of practical information on all subjects relating to the farm and household. The Eddy printing and publishing house, Flint, Michigan 1885
- The Law of Combinations: embracing monopolies, trusts, and combinations of labor and capital. Callaghan and Company, Chicago 1901
- Two thousand miles on an automobile; being a desultory narrative of a trip through New England, New York, Canada, and the West J.B. Lippincott Co., Philadelphia 1902. Originally published under the pseudonym "Chauffeur."
- Delight, the soul of art. J.B. Lippincott Co., Philadelphia 1902
- Recollections and Impressions of James A. McNeill Whistler. J. B. Lippincott Co., Philadelphia 1903
- Tales of a Small Town: By One Who Lived There J. B. Lippincott Co., Philadelphia 1907
- Tiled roofs; the kind of buildings to which they are suited and a method of construction that makes them practical as well as picturesque The Craftsman, May 1907
- Ganton & Co.; a story of Chicago commercial and social life. McClurg, Chicago 1908
- Unmask! a play, 1909
- The New Competition; an examination of the conditions underlying the radical change that is taking place in the commercial and industrial world. D. Appleton, New York 1912
- Cubists and Post-impressionism. A. C. McClurg & Co., Chicago 1914

== Resources ==
- Art Institute of Chicago: The Arthur Jerome Eddy collection of modern paintings and sculpture. Chicago 1931
- Art Institute of Chicago: Paintings in the Art Institute of Chicago. Chicago 1961
- Distel, Anne. Les collectionneurs des impressionnistes, Amateurs et marchands La Bibliothèque des Arts, Paris 1989 ISBN 2-85047-042-2
- Dictionary of Art Historians, "Arthur Jerome Eddy"
- Robson, A. Deirdre. "Eddy, Arthur Jerome." In Grove Art Online. Oxford Art Online, (accessed February 28, 2012; subscription required).
- Sweet, Frederick A. Great Chicago Collectors in Apollo Magazine September 1966
