= Charles N. Beecher =

American politician

Member of the Michigan House of Representatives from the Genesee County 1st district
- In office January 1, 1857 – December 31, 1858
- Preceded by: Daniel N. Montague
- Succeeded by: Edward Hughes Thomson

Member of the Michigan House of Representatives from the Genesee County district
- In office February 5, 1851 – December 31, 1852

Personal details
- Born: May 7, 1806 Livonia, New York
- Died: November 2, 1864 (aged 58) Flint, Michigan
- Party: Whig (Before 1856); Republican (After 1856)

Charles N. Beecher (May 7, 1806 – November 2, 1864) was a Michigan politician.

== Early life ==
Beecher was born on May 7, 1806, in Livonia, New York. Beecher moved to Michigan in May 1836.

== Career ==
After arriving to the state in 1836, Beecher settled a farm in Genesee, Michigan. Beecher lived on farm until 1854. On November 5, 1850, Beecher was elected to the Michigan House of Representatives where he represented the Genesee County district from February 5, 1851, to December 31, 1852. Sometime after this term in the legislature, Beecher switched from being a Whig to a Republican. On November 4, 1856, Beecher was elected to the Michigan House of Representatives where he represented the Genesee County 1st district from January 7, 1857, to December 31, 1858. During unspecified years of his life, Beecher has served as a postmaster for seventeen years, a county commissioner for two years, and an associate county judge.

== Death ==
In 1854, Beecher moved to Flint, Michigan. Beecher died in Flint on November 2, 1864.
