= William Ball (Michigan politician) =

American politician (1830–1902)

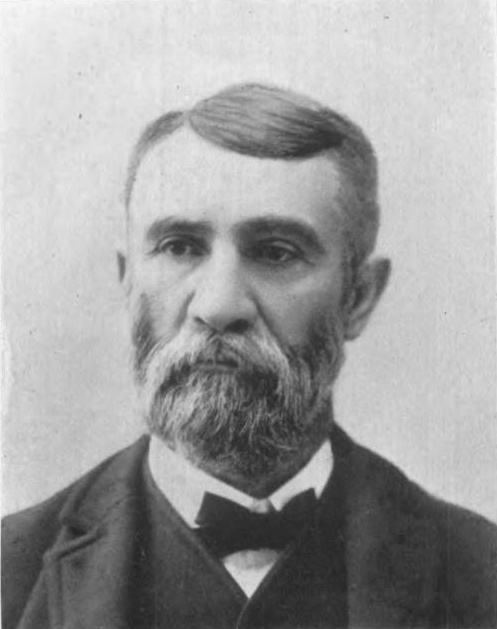

25th Lieutenant Governor of Michigan
- In office January 19, 1889 – January 1, 1891
- Governor: Cyrus G. Luce
- Preceded by: James H. MacDonald
- Succeeded by: John Strong

Member of the Michigan Senate from the 13th district
- In office 1889–1890
- Preceded by: William A. Atwood
- Succeeded by: John R. Benson

Member of the Michigan House of Representatives from the Livingston County district
- In office 1881–1882

Member of the Michigan House of Representatives from the Livingston County 1st district
- In office 1865–1868

Personal details
- Born: April 7, 1830 Cayuga County, New York
- Died: August 28, 1902 (aged 72) Ann Arbor, Michigan
- Party: Republican

William Ball (April 7, 1830 – August 28, 1902) was an American politician. From 1865 to 1868, he served in the Michigan House of Representatives, where he represented the Livingston County 1st district. He served another term in the state House from 1881 to 1882, where he represented the Livingston County district. During this term, he served as speaker pro tempore. From 1889 to 1890, Ball was served in the Michigan Senate. As president pro tempore of the state Senate, Upon the death of Lieutenant Governor James H. MacDonald in 1889, Ball served president of the Senate and as acting lieutenant governor. He died at age 72 in Ann Arbor, Michigan.
