= David Spencer Fox =

American politician (1817–1901)

14th Mayor of the City of Flint, Michigan
- In office 1871–1873
- Preceded by: James B. Walker
- Succeeded by: George H. Durand

4th Alderman
- In office 1862–1864 Serving with Alexander McFarland(1962); O.F. Forsyth (1963)
- Preceded by: Oscar W. Adams Jr.
- Succeeded by: William Stevenson
- Constituency: 1st Ward, City of Flint, Michigan

Personal details
- Born: 1817 Warren County, Pennsylvania
- Died: 1901 (aged 83–84)
- Resting place: Glenwood Cemetery, Flint, Michigan

David Spencer Fox (1817–1901) was a Michigan politician.

== Early life ==
In 1817, Fox was born in Warren County, Pennsylvania. He gained employment with a shingles manufacturing company. He came to Michigan in 1846. In Flint, He became a partner of Walker & Begole, a shingles manufacturer, timber land speculation and logging firm.

== Political life ==
Fox first was elected to serve the first ward on the Flint City Council in 1862 and 1863. He was elected as mayor of the City of Flint in 1871 serving two 1-year terms.

== Post-Political life ==
In 1880, Fox became president of the First National Bank. He also became involved with the Flint Wagon Works, which later acquired by the Chevrolet Motor Company. He died in 1901 and was buried at Glenwood Cemetery, Flint, Michigan.

Political offices
Preceded by James B. Walker	Mayor of the City of Flint, Michigan; 1871-73	Succeeded by George H. Durand
Preceded by Oscar W. Adams Jr. Alexander McFarland	Alderman, 1st Ward of Flint; 1862-1864 with Alexander McFarland(1962); O.F. Forsyth (1963)	Succeeded by William Stevenson
