= Alexander McFarland =

American politician and businessman (1812–1881)

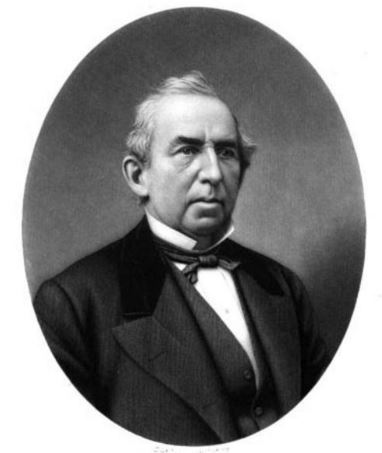

16th Mayor of the City of Flint, Michigan
- In office 1875–1876
- Preceded by: George H. Durand
- Succeeded by: William Hamilton

4th Alderman
- In office 1861–1863 Serving with Oscar Adams (1861); David Spencer Fox (1962)
- Preceded by: John C. Allen
- Succeeded by: O.F. Forsyth
- Constituency: 1st Ward, City of Flint, Michigan

Personal details
- Born: 14 February 1812 Montgomery, New York
- Died: 22 April 1881 (aged 69) Flint, Michigan
- Spouse: Margaret Ann Simpson
- Children: Jennie, Mary, Alexander, Anna
- Occupation: Politician, businessman

Alexander McFarland (more commonly "McFarlan") was a Michigan politician and a prominent lumberman and businessman in Flint, Michigan.

== Early life ==
McFarlan was born on 14 February 1812 in Montgomery County, New York to John and Jeanette McFarlan. Both of his parents emigrated from Scotland in their youth. When McFarlan was one year old, his father died and he was raised by his mother. As a young man, he was trained in the tannery trade, shoe-making and for a brief stint, attended a seminary in Rochester, New York.

== Business life ==
He was married to Margaret Ann Simpson in 1842 and in 1850, he purchased fifty percent of a saw mill in Flint, Michigan forming the firm, "Hazelton & McFarlan". His saw mills burned down a total of three times. After the first fire, McFarlan bought out his partner and rebuilt. Each time he rebuilt, he built on a larger scale and was, in the end, a successful lumberman, producing 11 million feet of cut lumber per year. In Flint, the only mill that was more successful at the time, was the mill owned by Henry H. Crapo.

Profits from his lumber business enabled him to buy up large tracts of pine forest land in Michigan. He also became an owner of large sections of the first ward in Flint. McFarlan's farm in Mount Morris, Michigan employed Charles W. Nash as a farm hand, paying $12 per month. While on the farm, Nash learned the carpentry trade from John Shelben and then started a hay pressing concern that lead him to meet his wife Jessie Halleck. Nash went on to find employment in the Flint Road Cart Company ultimately becoming president of General Motors in 1915.

McFarlan became one of the leading stockholders and a president of the Citizen's National Bank in Flint. He was succeeded as bank president by his son-in-law, Robert J. Whaley who served as president for over twenty-six years.

== Political life ==
McFarland was elect for the 1st Ward, Alderman twice back to back beginning in 1861. He was elected as mayor of the City of Flint in 1875 serving a 1-year term.

== Death ==
McFarlan died at his home in Flint on 22 April 1881.

Political offices
Preceded by George H. Durand	Mayor of Flint; 1875-76	Succeeded by William Hamilton
Preceded by John C. Allen	Alderman, 1st Ward of Flint; 1861-1863 with Oscar Adams (1861); David Spencer Fox (1962)	Succeeded by O.F. Forsyth
