= Jerome Eddy =

American politician

19th Mayor of the City of Flint, Michigan
- In office 1878–1879
- Preceded by: Edward Hughes Thomson
- Succeeded by: James C. Willson

Personal details
- Born: November 29, 1829 Stafford, Genesee County, New York
- Died: November 24, 1905 (aged 75)
- Party: Democratic
- Spouse: Ellen M. Curtis
- Relations: Willard and Eliza (Case) Eddy, Parents; Lulu Orrell, daughter-in-law
- Children: Arthur Jerome Eddy
- Profession: Businessman

Jerome Eddy was a Michigan businessman, politician and diplomat. He served on the Democratic Michigan State Central Committee and was a delegate to many Democratic State Conventions. During the Grover Cleveland Presidency, he served as a United States Consul in Canada.

== Early life ==
Born on November 29, 1829, in Stafford, Genesee County, New York, Eddy moved to Flint with his parents, Willard and Eliza (Case) Eddy, in 1837. In 1841, he left school to become an apprentice to George H. Hazleton, brother of another Flint Mayor, Porter Hazelton. When he reached the age of 20, he went into business for himself as a merchant and into real estate. Ellen M. Curtis married Eddy in 1858. Eddy was in the lumbering business with Artemus Thayer operating a planing mill. Original, he lived with his wife at the corner of East Kearsley and Clifford streets, later the location of the Flint Public Library building, The Carnegie Library, in 1910. Around 1870 they moved to a house on Church Street built by George Hazelton in the 1930s.

== Political life ==
He was elected as the mayor of the City of Flint in 1878 serving a 1-year term. While Mayor in 1878, Eddy purchased the Genesee Democrat from H. N. Mather. Soon afterwards, his son Arthur Jerome Eddy managed and edited the Democrat. His son became a noted businessman, art collector, and writer. His son married Lulu Orrell, the granddaughter of Henry H. Crapo, a Governor of Michigan.

== Post-political life ==
Eddy was buried in Glenwood Cemetery, Flint after he died on November 24, 1905.

Political offices
Preceded by Edward Hughes Thomson	Mayor of Flint; 1878-1879	Succeeded by James C. Willson
