= 1862 Michigan gubernatorial election =

- November 4, 1862
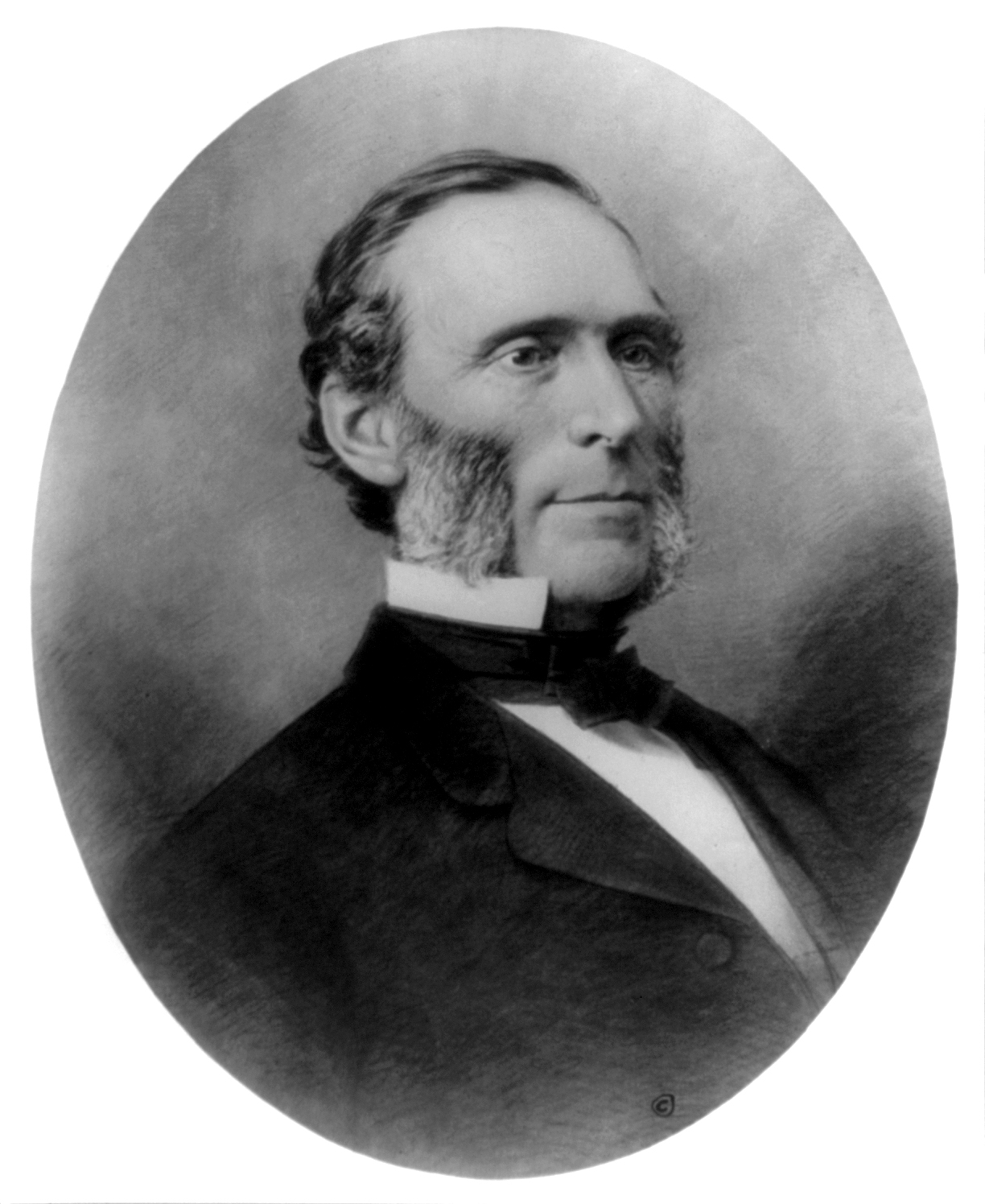

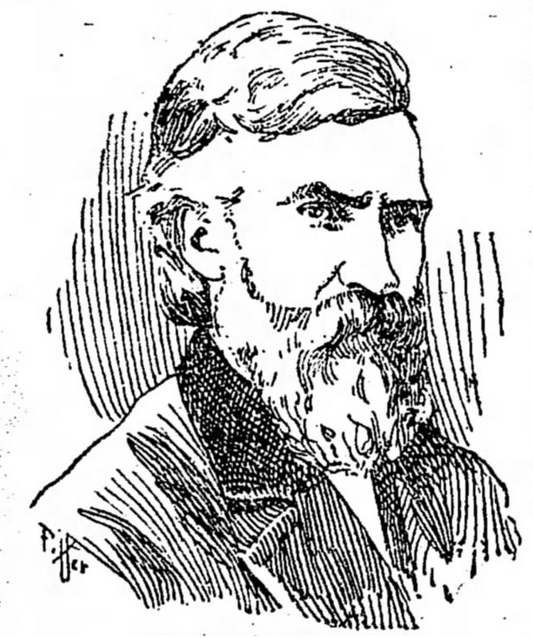
Nominee	Austin Blair	Byron G. Stout
Party	Republican	Democratic
Popular vote	68,716	62,102
Percentage	52.51%	47.46%
- County results Blair: 50–60% 60–70% 70–80% 80–90% Stout: 50–60% 60–70% 70–80% 80–90% No Data/Votes
Governor before election
Austin Blair
Republican
Elected Governor
Austin Blair
Republican

The 1862 Michigan gubernatorial election was held on November 4, 1862. Incumbent Republican Austin Blair defeated Democratic nominee Byron G. Stout with 52.51% of the vote.

== General election ==
=== Candidates ===
Major party candidates

- Austin Blair, Republican
- Byron G. Stout, Democratic

=== Results ===
1862 Michigan gubernatorial election
Party	Candidate	Votes	%	±%
Republican	Austin Blair (inc.)	68,716	52.51%	−4.12%
Democratic	Byron G. Stout	62,102	47.46%	+4.10%
	Imperfect (Note: These are ballots that were intended for the main candidates but contained misspellings. The canvass does not list specific variations, it just groups these votes together.)	24	0.02%	
	Scattering	16	0.01%	
Majority		6,614	5.05%	
Total votes		130,858	100.00%	
Republican hold		Swing	-8.22%	

==== Results by county ====
No votes were recorded in Delta County and Manitou County.

County	Austin Blair Republican		Byron G. Stout Democratic		Margin		Total votes cast
County	#	%	#	%	#	%	Total votes cast
Allegan	1,467	51.38%	1,386	48.55%	81	2.84%	2,855 (Note: Includes 2 Imperfect votes)
Alpena	74	81.32%	14	15.38%	60	65.93%	91 (Note: Includes 3 Imperfect votes)
Allegan	1,649	61.58%	1,029	38.42%	620	23.15%	2,678
Bay	256	39.63%	390	60.37%	-134	-20.74%	646
Berrien	1,864	47.26%	2,076	52.64%	-212	-5.38%	3,944 (Note: Includes 4 Scattering votes)
Branch	2,414	62.90%	1,424	37.10%	990	25.79%	3,838
Calhoun	3,198	58.34%	2,283	41.65%	915	16.69%	5,482 (Note: Includes 1 Imperfect vote)
Cass	1,424	49.21%	1,468	50.73%	-44	-1.52%	2,894
Cheboygan	8	17.39%	38	82.61%	-30	-65.22%	46
Chippewa	33	24.63%	101	75.37%	-68	-50.75%	134
Clinton	1,251	50.73%	1,214	49.23%	37	1.50%	2,466 (Note: Includes 1 Scattering vote)
Eaton	1,668	56.75%	1,270	43.21%	398	13.54%	2,939
Emmet	94	41.78%	131	58.22%	-37	-16.44%	225
Genesee	2,401	57.21%	1,796	42.79%	605	14.42%	4,197
Grand Traverse	518	83.41%	103	16.59%	415	66.83%	621
Gratiot	524	62.09%	320	37.91%	204	24.17%	844
Hillsdale	3,213	66.73%	1,600	33.23%	1,613	33.50%	4,815
Houghton	125	24.04%	395	75.96%	-270	-51.92%	520
Huron	262	50.68%	249	48.16%	13	2.51%	517 (Note: Includes 6 Imperfect votes)
Ingham	1,645	48.03%	1,780	51.97%	-135	-3.94%	3,425
Ionia	1,958	64.28%	1,088	35.72%	870	28.56%	3,046
Iosco	9	24.32%	28	75.68%	-19	-51.35%	37
Isabella	196	73.41%	71	26.59%	125	46.82%	267
Jackson	2,613	49.76%	2,638	50.24%	-25	-0.48%	5,251
Kalamazoo	2,752	57.71%	2,014	42.23%	738	15.47%	4,769 (Note: Includes 3 Scattering votes)
Kent	3,090	54.07%	2,625	45.93%	465	8.14%	5,715
Keweenaw	88	51.46%	83	48.54%	5	2.92%	171
Lapeer	1,325	54.21%	1,119	45.79%	206	8.43%	2,444
Lenawee	4,069	53.97%	3,466	45.97%	603	8.00%	7,540 (Note: Includes 3 Imperfect votes and 2 Scattering votes)
Livingston	1,633	46.42%	1,885	53.58%	-252	-7.16%	3,518
Mackinac	23	21.90%	82	78.10%	-59	-56.19%	105
Macomb	1,903	49.93%	1,906	50.01%	-3	-0.08%	3,811 (Note: Includes 1 Imperfect vote and 1 Scattering vote)
Manistee	64	51.61%	60	48.39%	4	3.23%	124
Marquette	108	61.02%	68	38.42%	40	22.60%	177
Mason	103	83.74%	20	16.26%	83	67.48%	123
Mecosta	103	76.87%	31	23.13%	72	53.73%	134
Midland	135	73.37%	49	26.63%	86	46.74%	184
Monroe	1,406	39.88%	2,119	60.10%	-713	-20.22%	3,526
Montcalm	451	56.59%	346	43.41%	105	13.17%	797
Muskegon	479	71.60%	190	28.40%	289	43.20%	669
Newaygo	375	69.32%	166	30.68%	209	38.63%	541
Oakland	3,368	48.36%	3,594	51.60%	-226	-3.24%	6,965 (Note: Includes 1 Imperfect vote and 2 Scattering votes)
Oceana	232	59.49%	158	40.51%	74	18.97%	390
Ontonagon	101	39.15%	157	60.85%	-56	-21.71%	258
Ottawa	993	45.03%	1,212	54.97%	-219	-9.93%	2,205
Saginaw	1,106	44.92%	1,355	55.04%	-249	-10.11%	2,462
Sanilac	514	67.28%	250	32.72%	264	34.55%	764
Shiawassee	1,229	50.97%	1,181	48.98%	48	1.99%	2,411
St. Clair	1,660	45.74%	1,969	54.26%	-309	-8.51%	3,629
St. Joseph	2,306	56.23%	1,794	43.75%	512	12.48%	4,101
Tuscola	715	69.35%	316	30.65%	399	38.70%	1,031
Van Buren	1,809	57.61%	1,331	42.39%	478	15.22%	3,140
Washtenaw	3,142	47.11%	3,527	52.89%	-385	-5.77%	6,669
Wayne	4,570	42.68%	6,137	57.32%	-1,567	-14.64%	10,707
Total	68,716	52.51%	62,102	47.46%	6,614	5.05%	130,858

===== Counties that flipped from Democratic to Republican =====
- Isabella

===== Counties that flipped from Republican to Democratic =====
- Berrien
- Cass
- Ingham
- Jackson
- Livingston
- Macomb
- Monroe
- Oakland
- Ontonagon
- Ottawa
- Saginaw
- St. Clair
- Washtenaw
- Wayne
