= William Hamilton (Flint politician) =

American politician (died 1878)

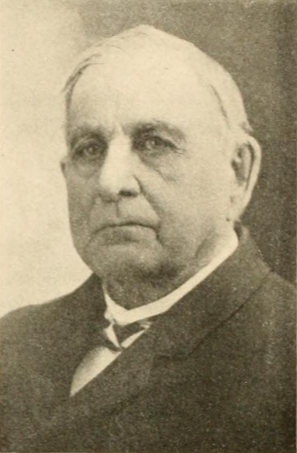

8th Mayor of the City of Flint, Michigan
- In office 1863–1865
- Preceded by: William Paterson
- Succeeded by: William B. McCreery

17th Mayor of the City of Flint, Michigan
- In office 1876–1877
- Preceded by: Alexander McFarland
- Succeeded by: Edward Hughes Thomson

3rd Alderman
- In office 1861–1863 Serving with Samuel B. Wicks (1861); Edward C. Turner
- Preceded by: Samuel N. Warren
- Succeeded by: I. N. Eldridge
- Constituency: 2nd Ward, City of Flint, Michigan

1st Assessor
- In office 1855–?
- Preceded by: none
- Succeeded by: ?
- Constituency: 2nd Ward, City of Flint, Michigan

Personal details
- Children: Lizzie

William Hamilton (died January 9, 1878) was a Michigan politician that was the ninth and eighteenth mayor of the city of Flint, Michigan serving from 1863 to 1865 and 1876 to 1877.

== Political life ==
At the first Flint City elections in 1855, Hamilton was selected as Second Ward Assessor. From 1861 to 1863 for 2 terms, he was City Council Alderman from the 2nd ward. He was elected as the eighth mayor of the City of Flint in 1863 and again in 1864, serving two one-year terms. He was later elected to the office again in 1876.

== Post-political life ==
His daughter, Lizzie, died from consumption on January 9, 1878.

Political offices
Preceded by William Paterson	Mayor of Flint; 1863-65	Succeeded by William B. McCreery
Preceded by Alexander McFarland	Mayor of Flint; 1876-77	Succeeded by Edward Hughes Thomson
Preceded by Samuel N. Warren	Alderman, 2nd Ward of Flint; 1861-1863 with Samuel B. Wicks (1861); Edward C. Turner	Succeeded by I. N. Eldridge
Preceded by none	Assessor, 2nd Ward of Flint; 1855-?	Succeeded by ?
