= Byron G. Stout =

American politician (1829–896)

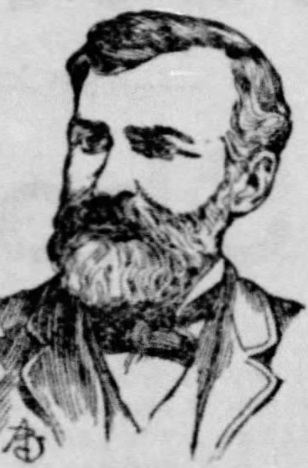
- The York Daily (York, PA), October 7, 1892

Member of the U.S. House of Representatives from Michigan's 6th district
- In office March 4, 1891 – March 3, 1893
- Preceded by: Mark S. Brewer
- Succeeded by: David D. Aitken

Member of the Michigan Senate
- In office 1860–1860

Member of the Michigan House of Representatives
- In office 1855–1855
- In office 1857–1857

Personal details
- Born: Byron Gray Stout; January 12, 1829 Richmond, New York
- Died: June 19, 1896 (aged 67) Pontiac, Michigan
- Party: Democratic
- Education: University of Michigan

Byron Gray Stout (January 12, 1829 – June 19, 1896) was a politician from the U.S. state of Michigan.

Stout was born in Richmond, New York and moved with his parents to Michigan in 1831. He attended the common schools and graduated from the University of Michigan at Ann Arbor in 1851. He studied law and became superintendent and principal of Pontiac High School in 1853 and 1854 respectively.

Stout served as a member of the Michigan House of Representatives in 1855 and 1857, serving as speaker in the latter year. He was also member of the Michigan Senate in 1860 and served as president pro tempore. He was a candidate for Governor of Michigan in 1862, losing to incumbent Republican Austin Blair.

He was a member of the National Union Convention at Philadelphia in 1866 and delegate to the Democratic National Conventions in 1868, 1880, and 1888. He was defeated for election to Congress to represent Michigan's 5th congressional district in 1868 and 1870, losing to Omar D. Conger. Prior to 1869, he engaged in private banking.

In 1890, Stout was elected as a Democrat from Michigan's 6th congressional district to the 52nd Congress, serving from March 4, 1891, to March 3, 1893. He was not a candidate for reelection in 1892.

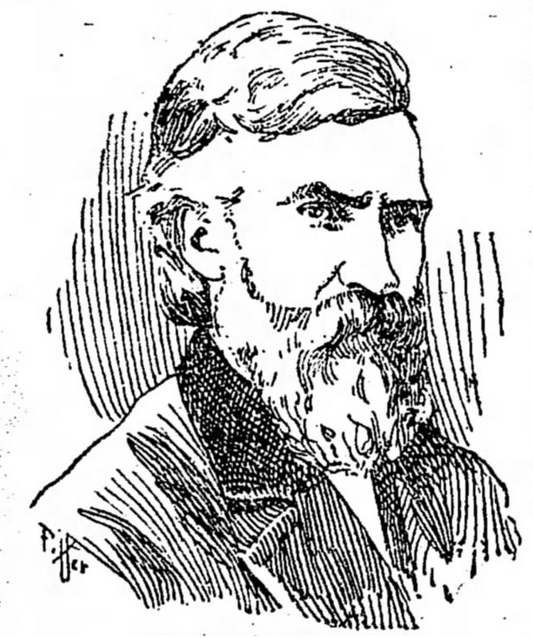
Detroit Free Press, June 20, 1896

Byron G. Stout served as president of the Oakland County Bank from 1893 to 1896. He died in Pontiac, Michigan on June 19, 1896, and is interred in Oak Hill Cemetery.

Party political offices
Preceded by John S. Barry	Democratic nominee for Governor of Michigan; 1862	Succeeded by William M. Fenton
U.S. House of Representatives
Preceded by Mark S. Brewer	United States Representative for the 6th Congressional District of Michigan; 1891 – 1893	Succeeded by David D. Aitken
