= Genesee Democrat =

Defunct newspaper in Flint, Michigan

- Format: Broadsheet
- Founded: 1845
- Ceased publication: 1906
- Headquarters: Flint, Michigan
- Price: 1.50

The Genesee Democrat was a major paper in Flint, Michigan printed from 1845 to 1906 under different names. It was an early paper in the county being challenged by the Wolverine Citizen, and the Flint Globe.

== History ==
Original the Democrat was named The Flint Republican and started publication in 1845 by Daniel S. Merritt. Price at that time was $1.50 cash or $2 in produce. In 1848, the Republican was acquired and renamed to Genesee Democrat by Royal W. Jenny. With the death in 1876 of Jenny, Mrs. Jenny, a poem book author, ran the paper for several weeks until it was sold to H. N. Mather for five hundred dollars. Mather added a Sunday Edition. He was editorially in support of the Democratic Party.

While Flint Mayor in 1878, Jerome Eddy purchased the Genesee Democrat from Mather. Soon afterwards, his son managed and edited the Democrat. In 1884, the Daily News was launched as a daily paper to complement the weekly Genesee Democrat.

William H. Werkheiser and Sons of Easton, Pennsylvania purchased the papers in 1884. In 1887, Werkheiser and this two sons, George and Frank F., began editing the paper. W. V. Smith, of Olean, New York purchased the papers in 1905 and operating them until sold to H. H. Fitzgerald in 1906. Fitzgerald fold the Democrat and the Daily News into his other newspapers.
