= Darnell Earley =

American administrator and initiator of Flint Water Crisis

Member of the Michigan Natural Resources Commission
- In office May 3, 2005 – December 31, 2008
- Appointed by: Jennifer Granholm

Emergency Manager of Detroit Public Schools
- In office January 2015 – February 29, 2016
- Appointed by: Rick Snyder
- Preceded by: Roy Roberts
- Succeeded by: Steven Rhodes (transition manager)

Emergency Manager of the City of Flint
- In office September 2013 – January 2015
- Appointed by: Rick Snyder
- Preceded by: Michael Brown
- Succeeded by: Jerry Ambrose

City Manager of Saginaw, Michigan
- In office June 6, 2006 – September 2013
- Preceded by: Cecil A. Collins, Jr.

Temporary Mayor of the City of Flint
- In office March 5, 2002 – August 6, 2002
- Preceded by: Woodrow Stanley
- Succeeded by: James W. Rutherford

City Administrator of Flint
- In office 2001–2004
- Succeeded by: Peggy Cook

Personal details
- Spouse: Sandra Faye (White) (d. August 12, 2003)
- Education: Muskegon Community College (associate); Grand Valley State University (B.S.); Western Michigan University (M.P.A.)
- Occupation: public administration

Darnell Earley is an American public administrator and municipal manager. Formerly the city manager of Saginaw, Michigan and emergency manager of Flint, Michigan, Earley served as temporary mayor of Flint after the recall of Woodrow Stanley. Earley was appointed emergency manager of the Detroit Public Schools system in January 2015. He resigned that position in February 2016. In January 2021 he was indicted on felony charges regarding the Flint water crisis. The charges were later dismissed.

== Early life and education ==
Earley was born to James and Earlie Mae Earley and was one of nine children. He grew up in Muskegon Heights, Michigan.

Earley graduated from Muskegon Heights High School in 1969 and earned an associate's degree from Muskegon Community College in 1975. He then earned a Bachelor of Science degree from Grand Valley State University and a Master of Public Administration degree from Western Michigan University.

== Career ==
=== Early career ===
Earley was director of community development at the Urban League of Greater Muskegon from 1978 to 1981. Later, he worked at Muskegon County as an assistant to the county administrator and equal employment opportunity officer until 1986. In 1985, Earley was appointed township manager in Saginaw County's Buena Vista Charter Township. Lewis Dodak, speaker of the Michigan House of Representatives, then named Earley as director of research and public policy for the House Democratic Caucus, and he served in this post from 1988 to 1992. From 1993 to 2001, Earley served as Ingham County budget director and deputy controller.

In April 2001, Earley was appointed the city administrator of Flint, Michigan. After the recall of Mayor Woodrow Stanley, Earley became temporary mayor from March 5 to August 6, 2002, the fourth African-American to hold the office. Part of his term was under an emergency financial manager, Edward J. Kurtz. He continued as city administrator under James W. Rutherford until July 2004.

In August 2004, Earley became deputy city manager and interim director of fiscal services for the City of Saginaw. In September 2005, Earley was appointed interim city manager of Saginaw, and in June 2006 was appointed city manager, remaining in that position until 2013.

Earley was paid an annual salary of $110,000 for his work in Saginaw under a contract that went into effect in 2005, but in a controversial addendum to Earley's employment contract with the City of Saginaw appointed by the City Council in May 2011, the city agreed to give lifetime health insurance and life insurance benefits to Earley. In 2015, Saginaw city councilman Michael Balls proposed rescinding this benefit, arguing that it was a "travesty" to give lifetime insurance for six years of city employment.

On May 3, 2005, Earley was appointed to the Michigan Natural Resources Commission by Governor Jennifer Granholm, for a term expiring on December 31, 2008. On September 30, 2011, Michigan Governor Rick Snyder appointed a state eight-member review team for City of Flint including Earley.

=== Emergency manager roles ===
Earley remained with the City of Saginaw served until he was appointed emergency manager (EM) for Flint in October 2013, succeeding Michael Brown. Earley served in that post from September 2013 until January 2015. Under Earley's leadership, the city separated from the Detroit Water and Sewerage Department and joined the Karegnondi Water Authority (KWA), a new regional water authority. The decision to join the KWA was made under then-Emergency Manager Ed Kurtz, and approved by then-State Treasurer Andy Dillon.

The water supply switched to the Flint River on April 25, 2014. This decision resulted in lead poisoning to the city, in what became known as the Flint water crisis. Some critics say that Flint's decision to join the KWA ultimately "put the city on course to draw water from the Flint River," while supporters of the KWA "reject that version of events and ... stress that the decision to break from the Detroit water system was separate from the later choice of tapping the Flint River as a temporary water source."

In October 2015, Earley said that he was not to blame for the decision, saying that the decision had been made before his term in office and that "It did not fall to me to second-guess or to invalidate the actions that were taken prior to my appointment."

Earley was appointed to be EM for Detroit Public Schools on January 13, 2015, the city's fourth consecutive EM in six years. At the time of Earley's appointment, the school system had a budget deficit of almost $170 million and faced rapidly declining enrollment. The state Democratic Party called for Earley to be fired from this post in October 2015, citing his tenure in Flint and that city's water crisis.

Earley frequently clashed with the Detroit Federation of Teachers (DFT) union. In December 2015 and January 2016, a series of organized teacher sickouts (which Earley condemned as "misguided" and illegal strikes) took place in the school system. In January 2016, the DFT sued DPS in state court, alleging that "the DPS and Darnell Earley have let the fiscal situation and the environmental conditions of the schools to deteriorate so severely that Detroit is not providing a minimally sufficient education." The teachers asked a judge to remove Earley as EM.

Earley announced his resignation on February 2, 2016 (effective February 29), after allegations were raised in the media about inaccurate reports sent to the state capitol claiming that more highly-paid administrator positions had been eliminated than really were. Jim Ananich, Democrat representing Flint, and the state Senate minority leader, said: "For the sake of the kids, Earley needed to go." The DFT hailed Earley's resignation, saying: "As emergency manager, Earley has shown a willful and deliberate indifference to our schools' increasingly unsafe and unhealthy conditions, and a blatant disrespect for the teachers, school employees, parents and students of our city."

In November 2015, Earley was one of fourteen officials named as defendants in a class action lawsuit brought in federal court by Flint residents. The complaint, filed in the U.S. District Court in Detroit, alleges that "Defendants' conduct in exposing Flint residents to toxic water was so egregious and so outrageous that it shocks the conscience" and that "For more than 18 months, state and local government officials ignored irrefutable evidence that the water pumped from the Flint River exposed (users) to extreme toxicity." Along with Earley, Governor Snyder, former Flint mayor Dayne Walling, former Flint EM Jerry Ambrose, and others were named as defendants.

In early February 2016, the Oversight and Government Reform Committee of the United States House of Representatives issued a subpoena to Earley to testify before the committee on the situation in Flint, but Earley's counsel said that he would be unavailable to appear.

On December 20, 2016, Michigan's attorney general Bill Schuette announced criminal charges of false pretenses and conspiracy to commit false pretenses, willful neglect of duty, and misconduct in office against Earley for his role in the Flint water crisis. Earley was arraigned on December 21, 2016.

On June 14, 2017, Michigan's attorney general Bill Schuette announced a further charge of involuntary manslaughter due to the events that took place under his watch in the Flint Water Crisis. In January 2021 he was indicted on two counts of felony misconduct in office. The charges were later dismissed.

== Memberships, affiliations, and awards and honors ==
Earley served as president of the International City/County Management Association (ICMA) in 2009 to 2010 and is an ICMA Credentialed Manager. Earley is a life member of Alpha Phi Alpha fraternity, a member of the National Forum for Black Public Administrators, and a former member of the National Association of County Administrators. Earley received the Western Michigan University School of Public Affairs and Administration's Outstanding Alumni Achievement Award in 2011. He received Muskegon Community College's Distinguished Alumni Award in 2015.

== Personal life ==
Earley is an ordained Baptist deacon.

Throughout his tenure in Flint and the Detroit Public Schools, Earley has lived in Delta Township, Michigan.

Earley was married to Sandra Faye (White) Earley, a former teacher and principal in Muskegon Heights Public Schools. She died in August 2003.

Political offices
Preceded by Woodrow Stanley	Mayor of Flint; March 5, 2002 – August 6, 2002; Temporary	Succeeded by James W. Rutherford
