= Portrait of Arthur Jerome Eddy =

Painting by James McNeill Whistler

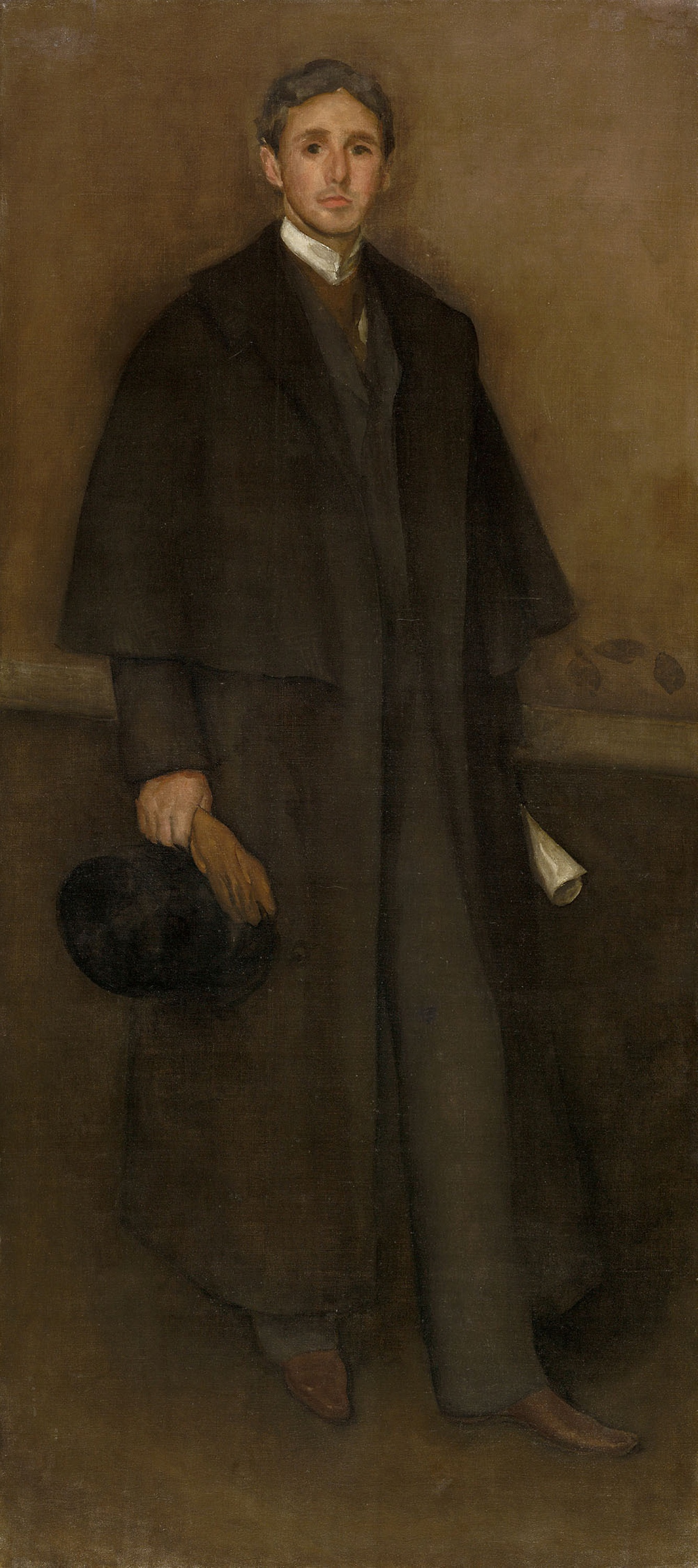
- Artist: James McNeill Whistler
- Year: 1894
- Type: Oil on canvas, portrait painting
- Dimensions: 209.9 cm × 92.4 cm (82.6 in × 36.4 in)
- Location: Art Institute of Chicago, Illinois

Portrait of Arthur Jerome Eddy is an 1894 portrait painting by the Anglo-American artist James McNeill Whistler. It depicts the American lawyer and noted art collector Arthur Jerome Eddy. Reflecting Whistler's ideas about Tonalism, it is also known by the longer title Arrangement in Flesh Colour and Brown.

Eddy became an admirer of Whistler's work after seeing it at the Chicago World's Fair in 1893. He travelled to Paris to sit for this portrait. He became a noted collector of Modern art. The picture passed by inheritance to Eddy's son, who presented it to the Art Institute of Chicago in 1931.

== See also ==
- List of paintings by James McNeill Whistler

== Bibliography ==
- Druick, Douglas. Master Paintings in the Art Institute of Chicago. Yale University Press, 2013.
- Merrill, Linda. After Whistler: The Artist and His Influence on American Painting. Yale University Press, 2003.
- Sutherland, Daniel E. Whistler: A Life for Art's Sake. Yale University Press, 2014.
