= Whaley Historic House Museum =

Historic house in Michigan, United States

- Robert J. Whaley House
- U.S. National Register of Historic Places
- Michigan State Historic Site
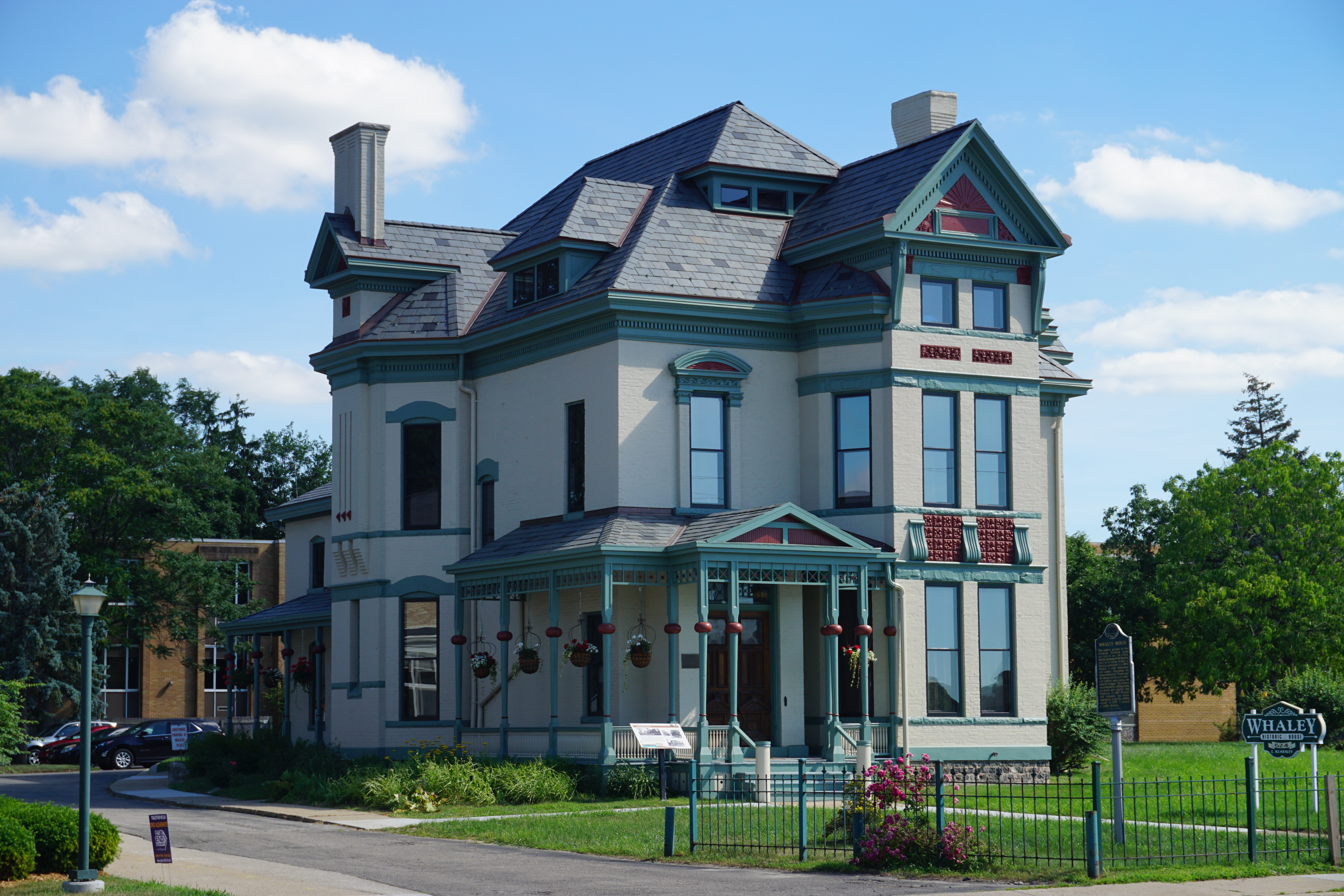
- The house in July 2018

- Location within Michigan Location within the United States
- Interactive map
- Location: 624 E. Kearsley St., Flint, Michigan
- Coordinates: 43.0200°N 83.6840°W
- Built: c. 1873
- Architectural style: Queen Anne
- NRHP reference No.: 80001855

Significant dates
- Added to NRHP: May 15, 1980
- Designated MSHS: February 7, 1977

The Whaley Historic House Museum, also known as the Robert J. Whaley House, is a historic house, now converted to a museum, located in Flint, Michigan. The house was listed as a Michigan State Historic Site in 1977 and added to the National Register of Historic Places in 1980.

== History ==
The land on which this house was constructed passed through several owners until it was purchased by Edward H. Thompson in 1847. In 1858, Thompson deeded the land to his daughter Mollie and her husband Austin Witherbee (a cashier at the First National Bank of Flint and later mayor of the city). At some point before 1859, either Thompson or Witherbee constructed a small Greek Revival house on the property. Austin Witherbee died in 1871, and his wife sold the property the next year to James H. Briscoe. Briscoe immediately constructed a much larger house, essentially what is seen today, attached to the original Greek Revival structure. Briscoe, however, was a poor businessman, and financial troubles forced him to sell in 1884. The next owner of the house, and who it is named for, was Citizens National Bank president Robert Whaley, who occupied the house beginning in 1884.

Robert Whaley was born in Wyoming County, New York in 1840 and lived in both New York and Wisconsin in his early years. In 1867 he married Mary McFalan, whose father Alexander was a prominent Flint lumberman and banker. The Whaleys moved to Flint, where Robert Whaley entered his father-in-law's business as a bookkeeper. In 1877 he was named a director of Citizens National Bank, and when Alexander McFalan died in 1881, Whaley succeeded him as bank president. The Whaleys lived in this house until Robert Whaley's death in 1922 and Mary Whaley's death in 1925.

The house has been used as a museum since 1974. In 2015, the third floor of the house was damaged by fire.

== Description ==
The Robert J. Whaley House is a two-story, Queen Anne house with asymmetrical massing and a hipped and dormered roof. The exterior is painted brick. The front facade is three bays wide, with a wraparound front porch covering the entrance in the left-most bay. A tall window with an elaborately carved rounded-arch lintel is above the porch roof. The central bay projects forward, and contains tall one-over-one double hung sash window units on the first and second stories, and is topped with a gabled dormer above the roofline. The right-most bay has three simple windows on each level.
