= Francis H. Rankin Jr. =

American politician

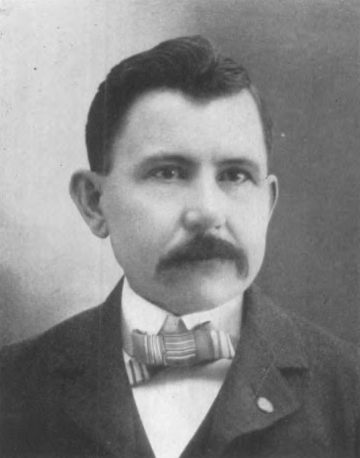

32nd Mayor of the City of Flint, Michigan
- In office 1891–1892
- Preceded by: William A. Paterson
- Succeeded by: George E. Taylor
- Constituency: City of Flint, Michigan

Treasurer of the City of Flint, Michigan
- In office 1881–1883
- Preceded by: Jared Van Vleet
- Succeeded by: Jonathan Palmer
- Constituency: City of Flint, Michigan

Personal details
- Born: December 28, 1854 Flint, Michigan
- Died: December 7, 1925 (aged 70) Flint, Michigan
- Resting place: Glenwood Cemetery, Flint, Michigan
- Party: Republican
- Spouse: Caroline Pierce
- Relations: Arabella and Francis H. Rankin Sr., Parents; Joseph Rankin, Richard S. Hearn, Grandfathers; Silas Pierce, father-in-law
- Children: Caroline A.
- Occupation: printer, editor, publisher
- Profession: Publishing

Francis H. Rankin Jr. (December 28, 1854 – December 7, 1925) was a Michigan politician and publisher.

== Early life ==
On December 28, 1854, Rankin was born in Flint, Michigan to Arabella and Francis H. Rankin Sr. He was educated by attending the ward schools until the age of thirteen when he went to work for his father's newspaper, the Wolverine Citizen. He was a co-owner of the paper with his father in 1881. On October 21 of that same year, Rankin married Caroline Pierce, daughter of Silas Pierce.

== Political life ==
In 1881, he was appointed to fill the vacancy in the office of Treasurer of the City of Flint under Mayor Charles A. Mason and serving another full term under Mayor George E. Newell. Rankin was elected as the Mayor of City of Flint in 1891 for a single 1-year term. Additional he was Secretary of the Republican County Committee for six years.

== Post-political life ==
He served in a few organization as officers with the Genesee County Agricultural Society as secretary and with the Flint Gentleman's Driving Club as Vice President On December 7, 1925 in Flint, Michigan, Rankin died and was later buried in Glenwood Cemetery, Flint, Michigan.

Political offices
Preceded by William A. Paterson	Mayor of Flint; 1891-92	Succeeded by George E. Taylor
Preceded by Jared Van Vleet	Treasurer of Flint; 1881-83	Succeeded by Jonathan Palmer
