= James C. Willson =

American politician

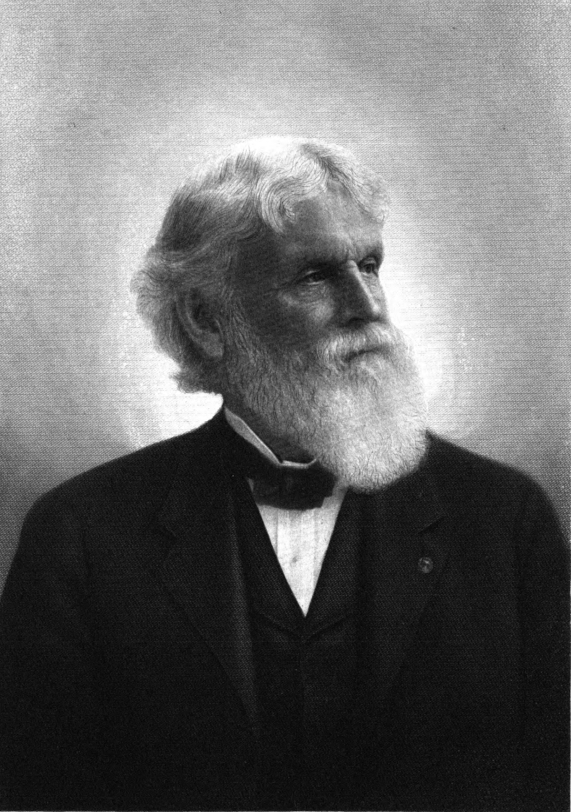

20th Mayor of the City of Flint, Michigan
- In office 1879–1880
- Preceded by: Jerome Eddy
- Succeeded by: Zacheus Chase

Personal details
- Born: April 28, 1833 Fitzroy Harbour, Upper Canada
- Died: August 29, 1912 (aged 79) Flint, Michigan
- Party: Republican
- Spouse: Rhoda Macomber Crapo
- Relations: John R. and Eliza (Riddell) Willson, Parents; Dr. George B. Willson, cousin Henry H. Crapo, father-in-law
- Children: George Crapo Willson
- Education: University of Michigan
- Occupation: Physician
- Profession: Medical

James Caldwell Willson (April 28, 1833 – August 29, 1912) was a Michigan politician.

== Early life ==
On April 28, 1833, Willson was born in Fitzroy Harbour, Upper Canada. Going to New York, he attended a district school and taught for a year. Moving on to Olean, New York, he was involved in making daguerreotypes. In the fall of 1855, Willson move to Ann Arbor to study at the University of Michigan medical department. In 1857, he started practicing medicine in the office of R. D. Lamond in Flint. Returning in 1858 to the University, Willson graduated in 1859 with a Doctor of Medicine degree. Back in Flint, he joined his cousin's, Dr. George B. Willson, practice. He serve as a Union Army major in the American Civil War. In 1861, he was a surgeon to the Tenth Michigan Infantry. Willson was transfer to the Eight Michigan Infantry. He was honorable discharged in March 1863 because of ill health. On May 18, 1865, he married Rhoda Crapo, daughter of Governor Henry H. Crapo. That same year, he was sent to Washington, D.C., as the appointed Michigan military agent. Willson joined and was active in two Civil War organizations: the Grand Army of the Republic and the Loyal Legion. On the death of Henry Crapo, the Willsons moved into the Crapo Mansion in Flint at First and Clifford (now Wallenberg Street) Streets, now known as Willson Park and part of the University of Michigan–Flint Campus.

== Political life ==
He was elected as the twentieth mayor of the City of Flint in 1879 serving a 1-year term. Additional, from 1881 to 1884, Willson served on the City of Flint School Board. As a trustee for the Michigan School for the Deaf, Willson served a six-year term.

== Post-political life ==
Willson became involved in businesses serving as Flint Gas Company's and Genesee County Savings Bank's president. His wife died on May 8, 1907, and buried in Glenwood Cemetery.

James C. Willson died in Flint on August 29, 1912.
