= Peggy R. Cook =

American politician

City Administrator
- In office July 2004 – 2007
- Preceded by: Darnell Earley
- Succeeded by: Darryl Buchanan

City Council Member
- In office 1991 – July 2004
- Succeeded by: Joshua Freeman
- Constituency: 4th Ward, City of Flint

Personal details
- Born: July 8, 1939
- Died: December 24, 2011 (aged 72) Grand Blanc Township, Michigan
- Resting place: Alabama
- Citizenship: USA
- Spouse: Robert “Bob” Cook

Peggy R. Cook (July 8, 1939 – December 24, 2011) was a politician in Flint, Michigan.

Cook was a community organizer on the East side of Flint in its 4th Ward, where she involved in neighborhood associations and starting neighborhood foot patrol.

In 1991, Cook was elected to the Flint City Council. She continue to get reelected and served until July 2003. At that time, Flint Mayor Don Wiliamson appointed Cook as City Administrator. In 2007, Cook was on extended sick leave for six months while a councilman, Scott Kincaid, question whether or not she had enough sick time accumulated. The Flint City Benefit Manager indicated that a city ordinance allows for extended sick pay at 75% pay. Her husband Bob was also serving as the City's director of parks and recreation.

In December 2007, Cook was replaced as Flint City Administrator, only to return in March 2008 as governmental operations director replacing former State Senator Joe Conroy until Williamson resigned from office of the Mayor in 2009.

On December 24, 2011, Cook died at Genesys Regional Medical Center, Grand Blanc Twp. and was buried in Alabama.

Political offices
Preceded by Darnell Earley	City Administrator of Flint; 2004-2007	Succeeded by Darryl Buchanan
Preceded by	Flint City Councilor, Ward 4; 1991-2004	Succeeded by Joshua Freeman
