= Mark S. Brewer =

American politician (1837–1901)

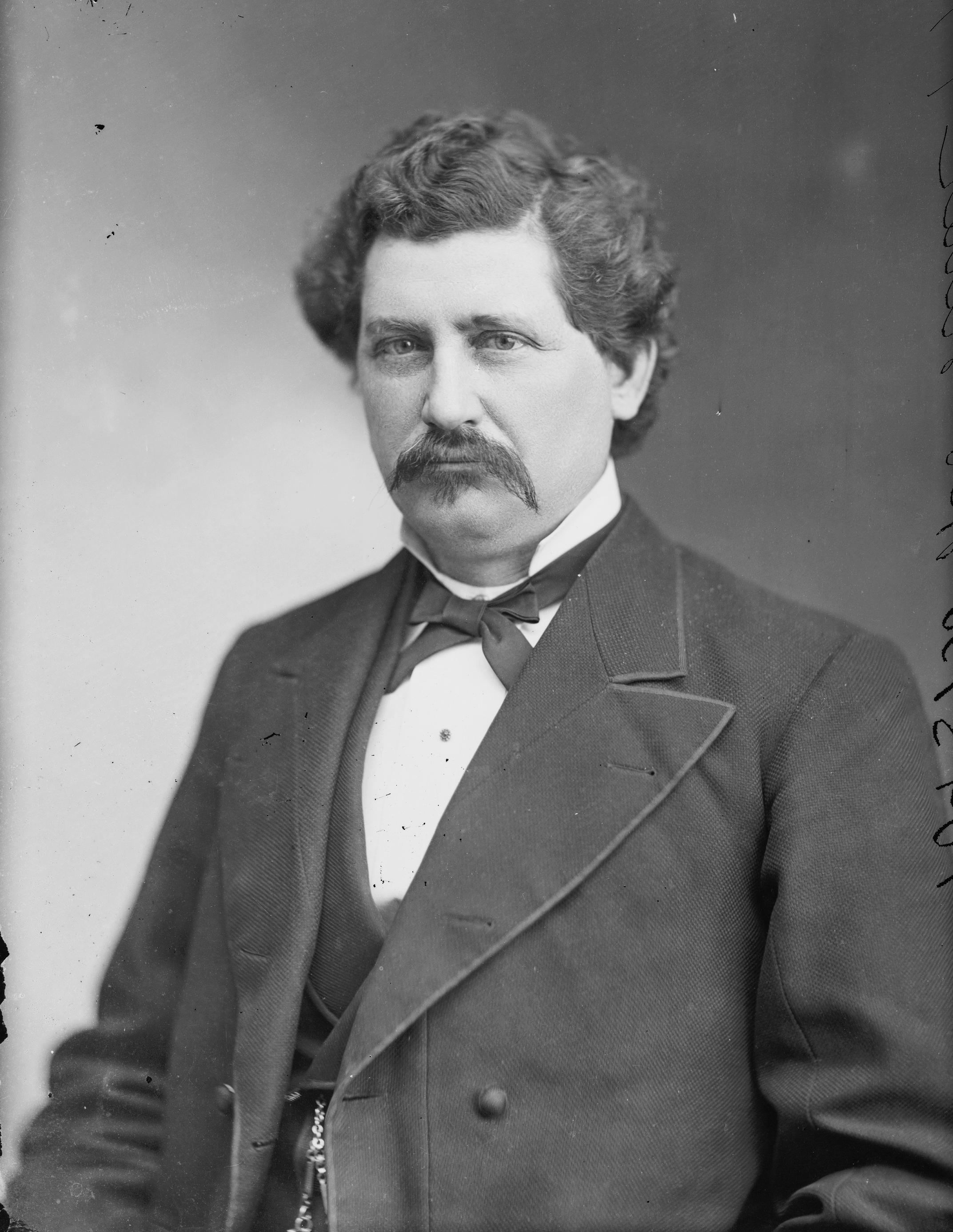

Member of the U.S. House of Representatives from Michigan's 6th district
- In office March 4, 1887 – March 3, 1891
- Preceded by: Edwin B. Winans
- Succeeded by: Byron G. Stout
- In office March 4, 1877 – March 3, 1881
- Preceded by: George H. Durand
- Succeeded by: Oliver L. Spaulding

Member of the Michigan Senate from the 20th district
- In office January 1, 1873 – January 1, 1875
- Preceded by: Homer G. Barber
- Succeeded by: Charles V. Babcock

Personal details
- Born: Mark Spencer Brewer; October 22, 1837 Addison Township, Michigan
- Died: March 18, 1901 (aged 63) Washington, D.C.
- Resting place: Oak Hill Cemetery
- Party: Republican
- Profession: lawyer

Mark Spencer Brewer (October 22, 1837 – March 18, 1901) was an American lawyer and politician from the U.S. state of Michigan who served four terms over two different stints in Congress between 1877 and 1891.

== Early life and education ==
Brewer was born in Addison Township, Michigan, and attended the rural schools and Romeo and Oxford Academies. He studied law, was admitted to the bar in 1864 and commenced practice in Pontiac. He was city attorney of Pontiac in 1866 and 1867 and circuit court commissioner for Oakland County 1866–1869. He was a member of the Michigan State Senate from the 20th District 1873–1874.

== Political career ==
Brewer was elected as a Republican to the United States House of Representatives from Michigan's 6th District for the 45th and 46th Congresses, serving from March 4, 1877, to March 3, 1881.

He was appointed consul general to Berlin on June 30, 1881, by U.S. President James A. Garfield and served from August 29, 1881, until June 7, 1885.

He was again elected to the U.S. House for the 50th and 51st Congresses, serving from March 4, 1887, to March 3, 1891. He declined to be a candidate for renomination in 1890 and resumed the practice of law in Pontiac.

=== Later career ===
He was a delegate to the 1896 Republican National Convention and was appointed a member of the United States Civil Service Commission by President William McKinley January 18, 1898, and served until his death in Washington, D.C.

== Death and burial ==
He is interred in Oak Hill Cemetery, in Pontiac, Michigan.

U.S. House of Representatives
| Preceded by George H. Durand | United States Representative for the 6th congressional district of Michigan; 1877–1881 | Succeeded by Oliver L. Spaulding |
| Preceded by Edwin B. Winans | United States Representative for the 6th congressional district of Michigan; 1887–1891 | Succeeded by Byron G. Stout |
