= Zacheus Chase =

American mayor

21st Mayor of the City of Flint, Michigan
- In office 1880–1881
- Preceded by: James C. Willson
- Succeeded by: Charles A. Mason

Personal details
- Born: April 18, 1837 New Bedford, Massachusetts, US
- Died: November 20, 1900 (aged 63) Flint, Michigan, US
- Party: Republican

Zacheus Chase was a Michigan politician.

He was elected as the mayor of the City of Flint in 1880 serving a one-year term.

Political offices
Preceded by James C. Willson	Mayor of Flint; 1880-81	Succeeded by Charles A. Mason
