= James H. MacDonald =

American politician

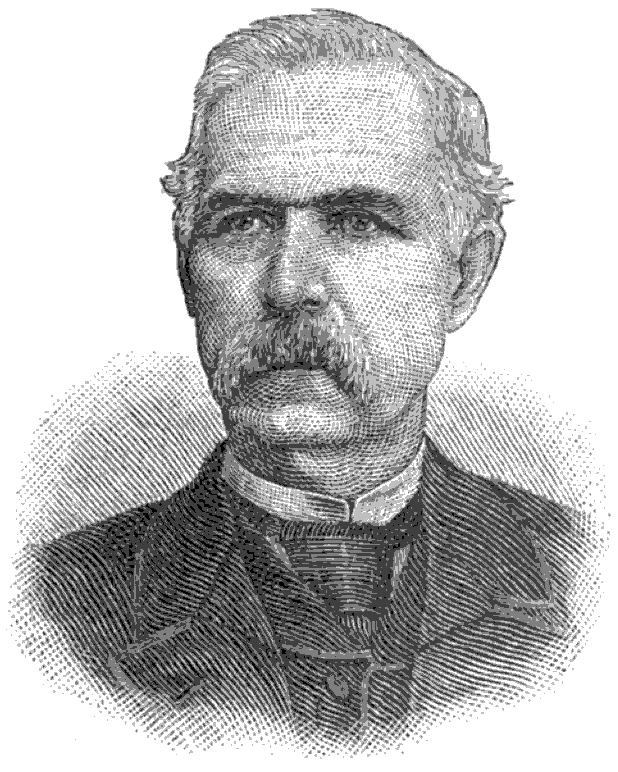

24th Lieutenant Governor of Michigan
- In office January 1, 1887 – January 19, 1889
- Governor: Cyrus G. Luce
- Preceded by: Archibald Buttars
- Succeeded by: William Ball

Personal details
- Born: May 1832 Inverness-shire, Scotland
- Died: January 19, 1889 (aged 56) Gogebic County, Michigan, U.S.
- Party: Republican

James Hugh MacDonald (May 1832 – January 19, 1889) was an American politician. He was elected to two terms as lieutenant governor of Michigan. During his second term, he died in a railroad accident.

== Biography ==
MacDonald was born in Northwest Inverness-shire, Scotland in May 1832. He immigrated to the United States in 1848. He first worked as a delivery clerk for a store in Pennsylvania. He then worked on a railroad, before moving to Ohio in 1854. Around 1857, he moved to Wisconsin. There, he chopped wood for the La Cross and Milwaukee rail road. From 1859 to 1863, he worked as a railway construction foreman in Cuba. Then, he moved to Michigan, where he was employed by the Chicago and North Western Railway Company. In 1865, he was employed to lead the construction of the Mineral Range Railroad. He then worked for the Chicago and North Western Railway Company again as a roadmaster until 1867, when he resigned due to the money he was gaining from his iron ore mining property. By 1887, MacDonald was receiving an income of $40,000 a year from the mining property he had purchased for under $350. He lived in Escanaba.

In 1886, James H. MacDonald was elected lieutenant governor of Michigan on the Republican ticket, defeating Democratic nominee Solomon S. Curry. He received 181,830 votes. In 1888, MacDonald was re-elected, defeating Democratic nominee William B. Moran. MacDonald received 235,030 votes in that election. On January 19, 1889, MacDonald died in a railroad accident near Elmwood station in Gogebic County. He left a widow and two children, a 25-year-old son and 20-year-old daughter.
