= William A. Atwood =

American politician (1835–1908)

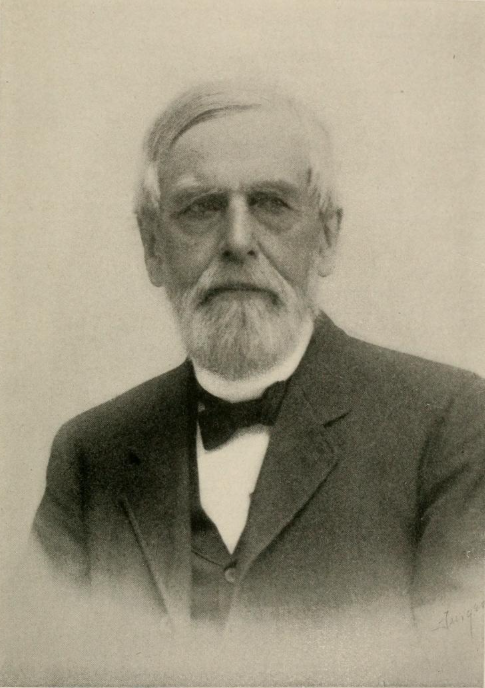

Michigan State Senator
- In office 1887–1888
- Governor: Cyrus G. Luce
- Preceded by: John Carveth
- Succeeded by: William Ball
- Constituency: 13th District

23rd Mayor of the City of Flint, Michigan
- In office 1882–1883
- Preceded by: Charles A. Mason
- Succeeded by: George E. Newell

Alderman
- In office 1877–1879 Serving with William A. Burr (1877-1878); Henry C. Walker (1878-1879)
- Preceded by: Henry Brown
- Succeeded by: S.I. Beecher
- Constituency: City of Flint 3rd Ward

Personal details
- Born: April 11, 1835 Newfane, Niagara County, N.Y.
- Died: April 11, 1908 (aged 73) Flint, Michigan
- Party: Republican
- Spouse: Helen C. Wood
- Relations: Asa and Fannie (Gibbs) Atwood, parents Jesse B., brother H.C. Wood, Father-in-law
- Children: Edwin W. Atwood
- Occupation: Farmer, Banker, Manufacturer
- Profession: Businessman

William A. Atwood (April 11, 1835 – April 11, 1908) was a Michigan politician.

== Early life ==
On April 11, 1835, Atwood was born in Newfane, Niagara County, New York born to Asa and Fannie (Gibbs) Atwood. Asa was a merchant who retired to farming. He joined his brother in a stave and cooperage factory at Galt, Canada. Closing the factory in fall of 1869, he returned to Pendleton, New York to farm for two years. During his those two years, he opened a shingle and heading mill which burnt down two and a half years later without insurance. He returned to Canada in the fall of 1863 to operate a business in lumber and shingles until the end of reciprocity treaty in March 1866. He started up the same business in Flint, Michigan with his brother, Jesse, and B.W. Linnington. He married Helen C. Wood, daughter of noted oldest Flint resident, H.C. Wood.

== Political life ==
For two years, he was a Third Ward Alderman. He was elected as the twenty fourth mayor of the City of Flint in 1882 serving a 1-year term. Many improvements were made to the city in his administration with the water works founded, the first city iron bridge and more. Atwood defeated former Michigan Governor Begole for the Michigan State Senate seat in 1886. In 1887 began Atwood service in the State Senate from the 13th District serving and chair three committees: on State affairs, on Public Lands and on Railroads. Additionally a new Flint City Charter was approved by the state legislature.

== Non-political life ==
He purchased a partnership share of Flint Woolen Mills in 1876 which would later be known by the name of Stone, Atwood & Co. He further purchased a share in Wood & Atwood Hardware Company in 1884 and maintained holdings in the First National Bank and Genesee County Savings Bank. He also served as vice president of Genesee County Savings Bank and president of Flint Gas-Light Company. He was buried in Glenwood Cemetery after his April 11, 1908 death.

Political offices
Preceded by Henry F. Pennington	Michigan State Senator; 13th District; 1882-1883	Succeeded by William Ball
Preceded by Charles A. Mason	Mayor of the City of Flint, Michigan; 1882-83	Succeeded by George E. Newell
