= Charles A. Mason =

American politician

22nd Mayor of the City of Flint, Michigan
- In office 1881–1882
- Preceded by: Zacheus Chase
- Succeeded by: William A. Atwood

Charles A. Mason was a Michigan politician.

== Early life ==
Charles A. Mason purchased Austin B. Witherbee's self-named drug store downtown and ran it for 22 years. It is now the name of a new grocery store set to open in spring 2009 to serve the downtown area at the corner of King Avenue and University Drive, the former old Hats by Jake building.

== Political life ==
He was elected as the mayor of the City of Flint in 1881 serving a 1-year term.

== Post-Political life ==
Political offices
Preceded by Zacheus Chase	Mayor of Flint; 1881-82	Succeeded by William A. Atwood
