= Archibald Buttars =

English-American politician (1838–1926)

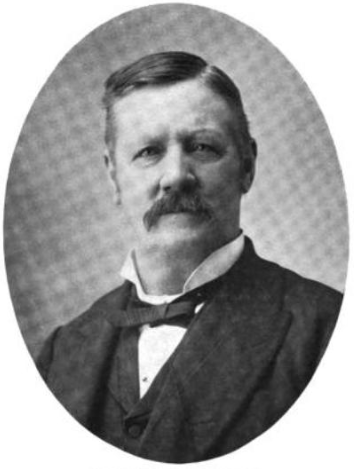
- Buttars in 1908

23rd Lieutenant Governor of Michigan
- In office January 1, 1885 – January 1, 1887
- Governor: Russell A. Alger
- Preceded by: Moreau S. Crosby
- Succeeded by: James H. MacDonald

Member of the Michigan Senate
- In office January 5, 1881 – 1884
- Preceded by: George W. Bell
- Succeeded by: William H. Francis
- Constituency: 30th district (1881–1882); 28th district (1883–1884)

Personal details
- Born: November 21, 1838 Manchester, England
- Died: June 5, 1926 (aged 87) National City, California, US
- Party: Republican
- Occupation: Politician

Archibald Buttars (November 21, 1838 – June 5, 1926) was an English-American politician. A Republican, he served as the Lieutenant Governor of Michigan, under Russell A. Alger.

== Biography ==
Buttars was born on November 21, 1838, in Manchester, the oldest child born to David Buttars and Esther (née Walley) Buttars. He was of English and Scottish ancestry. In April 1849, his family moved to Cincinnati, to Huron County, Michigan in September 1862, then finally to Emmet County in 1856. There, he worked in the lumber industry. He later worked as a merchant. He lived in Charlevoix, where he was vice-president of its bank.

Buttars was a Republican. He was a member of the Michigan Senate from January 5, 1881, to 1884. He represented the 30th district in 1881 and 1882, and its 28th district in 1883 and 1884. In the Senate, he was chairman of the Committee on Public Lands and on Fisheries, and was a member of the Committee on the State Normal School, on Counties and Townships, and on Roads and Bridges. He served as Lieutenant Governor from January 1, 1885, to January 1, 1887, under Russell A. Alger. He earned $3.00 per day as Lieutenant Governor and served as acting Governor for a time.

On September 1, 1864, Buttars married Celia E. Moses, with him he had a daughter. Celia died in July 1875, and around 1896, he married Emma C. Blinn, having no children together. He was a member of the Methodist Episcopal Church, as well as member of the Knights Templar. He died on June 5, 1926, aged 87, in National City, California. His body was brought to Charlevoix on September 15, after which he was buried.
