= Wolverine Citizen =

Weekly newspaper in Flint, Michigan

- Type: Weekly newspaper
- Format: Quarto
- Owner(s): F.H. Rankin & Son
- Editor-in-chief: Francis H. Rankin, Sr. & Jr.
- Founded: 1850
- Ceased publication: 1915
- Political alignment: Republican
- Headquarters: Flint, Michigan

The Wolverine Citizen was a weekly newspaper in Flint, Michigan. The paper also operated as a general printer.

== History ==
In 1850, Francis H. Rankin, Sr. came to Flint, Michigan and opened the Genesee Whig. Six years later it was renamed The Wolverine Citizen and Genesee Whig. Later yet, Genesee Whig was dropped from the title. The paper was used to support the formation of the Republican Party from the remains of the Whig Party and the anti-slavery section of the Democratic Party. During the American Civil War, the newspaper switched to daily publication for 18 months. The paper was very supportive of the Federal side.

When Francis, Jr. - son of Francis H. Rankin, Sr. - was thirteen, he started working at the press. In 1881, he gained some interest in the Citizen, and went on to continue the paper after his father's death in 1900, up until 1915.

A number of prominent Michigan journalist got their start at the Citizen: W. R. Bates, Lumberman's Gazette; C. B. Turner, Pontiac Gazette; R. L. Warren, Lawrence Advertiser; Morgan Bates, Jr., Marshall Statesman; E. D. Cowles, of the Saginaw Daily Courier; W. A.. Smith, of the Charlevoix Sentinel; Harry Hall, Stuart Locomotive; Charles Fellows, of the Flint Journal; Orlando White, of the Linden Record and A. M. Woodin, of the Lansing Sentinel.
