= Robert J. Whaley =

American banker

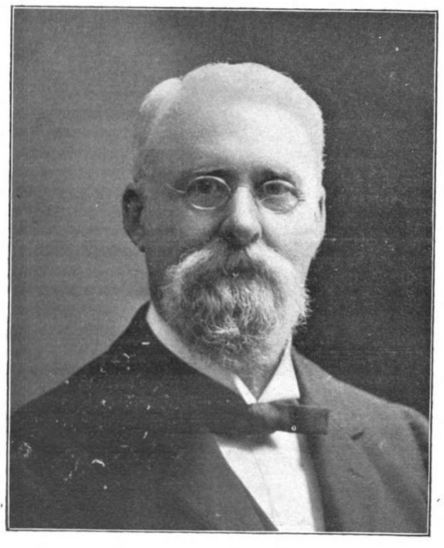
- Portrait of Robert Whaley
- Born: Robert J. Whaley; December 8, 1840; Castile, New York
- Died: February 12, 1922 (aged 81); Flint, Michigan
- Occupation: Banker
- Known for: Philanthropy, banking, lumber
- Spouse: Mary McFarlan (m. January 24, 1867, d. 1925)
- Children: Donald

Robert J. Whaley (December 8, 1840 – February 12, 1922) served as Citizens Bank's president for over forty years. His 1886 loan to the Flint Road Cart Company eventually led to the creation of General Motors in 1908. William C. Durant's bank book, which records the loan, is currently exhibited at Whaley House Historical Museum courtesy of Citizens Bank.

== Early years ==
Whaley was born in 1840 in Castile, New York to Jeremiah and Parmelia Ann Whaley. He moved to Wisconsin during the 1840s.

== Family ==
He married Mary McFarlan from Flint, Michigan, where they resided. Around 1885, the family moved into a large Victorian home in Flint. This building, known as the Whaley Historic House Museum, is now used as a museum.

The Whaleys' only son, Donald, died at the age of ten after contracting diphtheria during a visit to Detroit with his mother. His mother was very affected by the loss of the child. Robert Whaley urged his grieving wife to use their affluence to create a memorial to their son by creating the Whaley Children's Foundation.

Still Mary's grief was near overwhelming, so Robert built her a 'new style' house on Stone Lake in Cassopolis, Michigan, where she could have peace and quiet and entertain close friends. She soon found herself with new purpose running the Whaley Children's foundation and preparing the house for friends to come stay for weekend parties. Through her foundation work Mary Whaley became close with a girl, Florence Bickford, and would welcome her into their family like she was their own child, although no formal adoption papers are known to exist.

== Death ==
Robert died under unexplained health complications in the Stone Lake House in 1922. A few years later Mary was also found dead in the Stone Lake House of the same unexplained complications. Local police investigated the death as a suicide, and even revisited Robert Whaley's death as a possible murder, but the investigation was cut short and the death was deemed to be by natural causes. Leaving their beloved, and then married, adopted daughter everything in their name.
