= Edward Hughes Thomson =

American politician

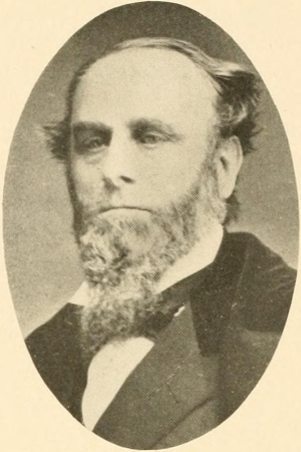

Member of the Michigan Senate from the 6th district
- In office 1848–1849

Member of the Michigan House of Representatives from the Genesee County 1st district
- In office 1849–1860

18th Mayor of the City of Flint, Michigan
- In office 1877–1878
- Preceded by: William Hamilton
- Succeeded by: Jerome Eddy

Prosecuting Attorney
- Constituency: Lapeer County

Prosecuting Attorney
- In office 1845–1846
- Constituency: Genesee County

Personal details
- Born: June 15, 1810 Kendal, Westmorland, England
- Died: February 2, 1886 (aged 75) Flint, Michigan
- Resting place: Glenwood Cemetery, Flint
- Occupation: Lawyer
- Profession: Law

Edward Hughes Thomson (1820-1886) was a Michigan politician.

== Early life ==
On June 15, 1810, Thomson was born in Kendal, Westmorland, England. He became a lawyer and practiced out of Millard Fillmore's Buffalo law office.

== Political life ==
He served as Lapeer County's and Genesee County's Prosecuting Attorney. Became a Michigan State Senator in 1848 for the 6th district then Genesee County 1st District Michigan Representative from 1859 to 1860. He enlisted as a colonel in the Union Army during the Civil War. He was elected as mayor of the City of Flint in 1877 serving a 1-year term.

== Death ==
Thomson died on February 2, 1886, in Flint, Michigan and is buried in Glenwood Cemetery, Flint.

Political offices
Preceded by William Hamilton	Mayor of Flint; 1877-78	Succeeded by Jerome Eddy
