= George H. Durand =

American judge and politician (1838–1903)

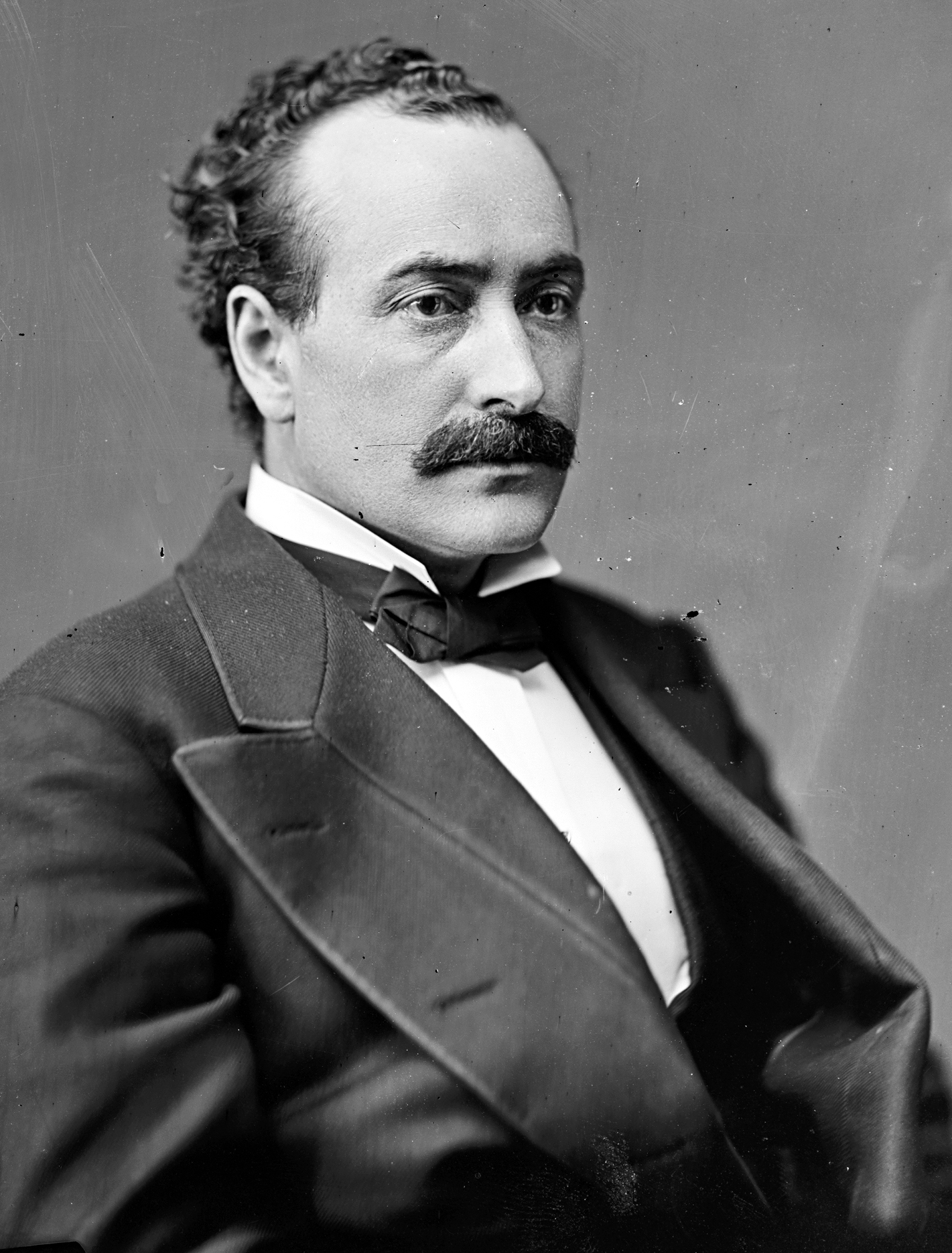
- Mathew Brady photo, Library of Congress

15th Mayor of the City of Flint, Michigan
- In office 1873–1875
- Preceded by: David Spencer Fox
- Succeeded by: Alexander McFarland

Member of the U.S. House of Representatives from Michigan's 6th district
- In office March 4, 1875 – March 3, 1877
- Preceded by: Josiah W. Begole
- Succeeded by: Mark S. Brewer

Personal details
- Born: George Harman Durand; February 21, 1838 Cobleskill, New York
- Died: June 8, 1903 (aged 65)
- Party: Democrat
- Relations: Lorenzo Thurston Durand, brother
- Occupation: Lawyer, Judge
- Profession: Law

George Harman Durand (February 21, 1838 – June 8, 1903) was a politician, jurist, and attorney from Michigan.

== Biography ==
Durand was born in Cobleskill, New York. He attended the common schools and Genesee Wesleyan Seminary at Lima, New York. Durand moved to Oxford, Michigan, in 1856, where he taught school, studied law, and was admitted to the bar.

Durand was the Worshipful Master of the Masonic Lodge - Genesee Lodge No. 174 F. & A. M in Flint Michigan from 1870 to 1874 and again in 1877 He was the Grand Master of the Grand Lodge of Free and Accepted Masons of the State of Michigan in 1875.

== Career ==
Durand commenced practice at Flint, Michigan, in 1858, where he was also a member of the board of education and a member of the board of aldermen, from 1862 to 1867. He was the mayor of Flint in 1873 and 1874.

In 1874, Durand was elected as a Democrat from Michigan's 6th congressional district to the 44th United States Congress, serving from March 4, 1875, to March 3, 1877. In 1876, he lost in the general election to Republican Mark S. Brewer.

Durand resumed his law practice. In 1892, he was one of Michigan's Presidential Electors. He was appointed Justice of the Michigan Supreme Court in 1892, and was subsequently defeated for election to the court in 1893 by Frank A. Hooker. Durand was president of the State board of law examiners for many years and was appointed special assistant United States attorney in Chinese and opium smuggling cases in Oregon, serving from 1893 to 1896.

== Death and legacy ==
Durand died in Flint and is interred in Glenwood Cemetery there.

In 1876, the community of Durand, Michigan, was named after him.

U.S. House of Representatives
| Preceded by Josiah W. Begole | United States Representative for the 6th congressional district of Michigan; 1875 – 1877 | Succeeded by Mark S. Brewer |
| Preceded by David Spencer Fox | Mayor of Flint; 1873-75 | Succeeded by Alexander McFarland |
