= Francis H. Rankin Sr. =

American politician

Francis Hamilton Rankin Sr.

Michigan State Senator
- In office 1877–1879

Michigan State Representative
- In office 1860–1865

14th Recorder (law)
- In office 1872–1873
- Preceded by: Charles E. McAlester
- Succeeded by: Solomon V. Hakes
- Constituency: City of Flint, Michigan

16th Recorder (law)
- In office 1874–1876
- Preceded by: Solomon V. Hakes
- Succeeded by: abolished (City Clerk)
- Constituency: City of Flint, Michigan

1st City clerk
- In office 1876–1879
- Preceded by: Created
- Succeeded by: J. B. F. Curtis
- Constituency: City of Flint, Michigan

Personal details
- Born: October 19, 1818 County Down, Ireland
- Died: August 11, 1900 (aged 81) Flint, Michigan, US
- Party: Whig; Republican
- Spouse: Arabella
- Relations: Joseph Rankin, Father; Richard S. Hearn, father-in-law
- Children: Francis H. Rankin Jr.
- Occupation: Printer, editor, publisher
- Profession: Publishing

Francis Hamilton Rankin Sr. (October 19, 1818 – August 11, 1900 in Flint, Michigan) was a Michigan, United States politician and publisher. He was a member of and Grand Master of the Independent Order of Odd Fellows and in 1873 was the Sovereign Lodge's Grand Representative. He received the Knight Templar degree in the Masons.

== Early life ==
Born in County Down, Ireland, to Joseph Rankin, He married Arabella Hearn of County Longford, Ireland. He came to the United States in 1848 initially to Pontiac, Michigan, where he learned the trade of printing. In 1850, he came to Flint, Michigan and founded the Genesee Whig, a weekly newspaper. On December 28, 1854, he had a son of the same name.

== Political life ==
Rankin was appointed to the Flint City Charter draft committee in 1855. Rankin served on the School Board for several terms. In 1860, he was elected to the first of two terms in Michigan House of Representatives. Rankin was elected City of Flint Recorder in 1872 serving a one-year term. In 1874, he returned to that position, serving additional terms until the city charter was amended to replace the elected Recorder office with a common council appointed clerk in 1876. He was the first person appointed to the office of City Clerk of Flint. In addition to being the City clerk, Rankin was elected as a Michigan State Senator in 1877 serving a single term. Under Governor Crapo, Rankin served as one of several prison inspectors. From 1879 to 1887, he served as postmaster.

== Post-political life ==
In 1895, with William C. Durant and several other individuals, they founded a fraternal beneficiary society on January 31, 1895 called the Knights of the Loyal Guard.

Political offices
Preceded by Charles E. McAlester	Recorder of Flint; 1872–1873	Succeeded by Solomon V. Hakes
Preceded by Solomon V. Hakes	Recorder of Flint; 1874–1876	Succeeded by abolished (City Clerk: Himself)
Preceded by None	City clerk of Flint; 1876–1879	Succeeded by J. B. F. Curtis
