= Roy Roberts (chief executive) =

American business executive (born 1939)

Roy S. Roberts is an American business executive who had a long career at General Motors before retiring as group vice president, North American Vehicle Sales, Service and Marketing in 2000. He is also a former managing director at Reliant Equity Investors. From 2011 - 2013 he was the Detroit Public Schools' Emergency Financial Manager and board chairman of the Education Achievement Authority of Michigan.

He is considered a pioneer for African Americans in the auto industry. He once told Forbes magazine, "I've been the first black everywhere I went. One of my jobs is to see I'm not the last."

An August 1988 article published in The New York Times stated Roberts was the second African-American vice-president at GM, after Otis Smith. For much of his career he was the highest-ranking African American in the automobile industry.

Roberts began his professional career working on an assembly line at Lear Siegler while attending Western Michigan University.

Roberts has also served in numerous volunteer and civic organizations. He is a member of the National Executive Board of the Boy Scouts of America (the organization's governing body) a former president of the Boy Scouts of America and an officer in the NAACP.

== Early life ==
Roberts was born in 1939, the ninth of ten children, in Magnolia, Arkansas. His mother died when he was two years old and later his father moved the family to Muskegon, Michigan. He describes his upbringing as "dirt-poor." His father worked two jobs (as a foundry employee and as a barber) to support the family. Roberts credits his father with instilling in him the value of education.

Roberts worked full-time while attending Western Michigan University at night, where he graduated with honors, with a bachelor's degree in Business Administration.

== Bloomfield Hills Country Club controversy ==
Roberts unwillingly found himself at the center of a controversial event at the Bloomfield Hills Country Club in 1994 when the club refused to admit him after he had applied for membership. Though the club claimed its actions were not based on Roberts' race, G.M.'s president, John F. Smith Jr., and its chief financial officer, J. Michael Losh, chose to resign their memberships with the club because Roberts had been barred from joining.

Roberts was later accepted as a member.

== Autobiography ==
Roberts' autobiography, My American Success Story: Always the First, Never the Last, was published in 2015.
