= 1923 in Michigan =

- Decades: 1900s; 1910s; 1920s; 1930s; 1940s
- See also: History of Michigan; Historical outline of Michigan; List of years in Michigan; 1923 in the United States

Events from the year 1923 in Michigan.

== Office holders ==
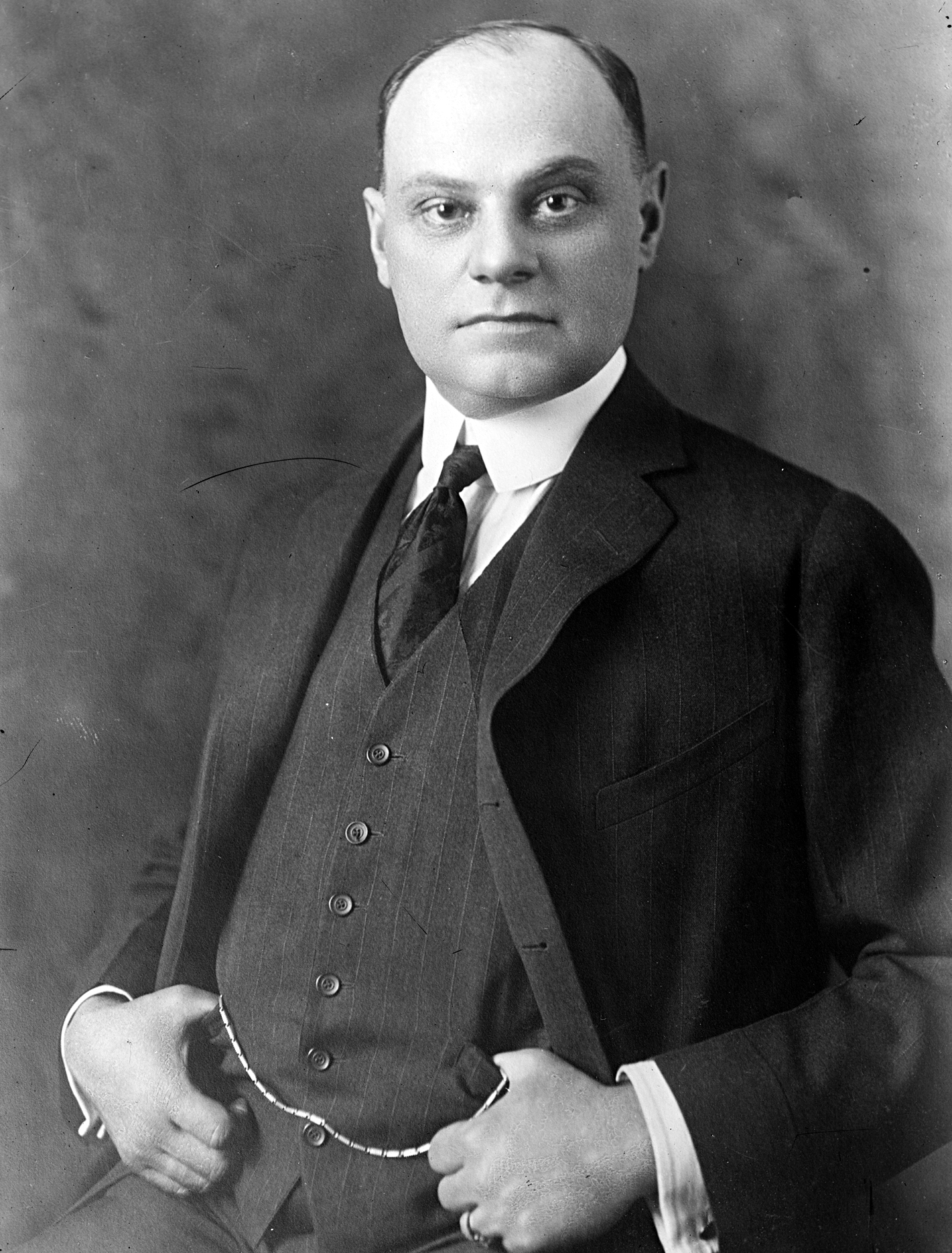
Gov. Groesbeck

=== State office holders ===
- Governor of Michigan: Alex J. Groesbeck (Republican)
- Lieutenant Governor of Michigan: Thomas Read (Republican)
- Michigan Attorney General: Merlin Wiley (Republican), Andrew B. Dougherty (Republican)
- Michigan Secretary of State: Charles J. DeLand (Republican)
- Speaker of the Michigan House of Representatives: George W. Welsh (Republican)
- Chief Justice, Michigan Supreme Court: Howard Wiest

=== Mayors of major cities ===
- Mayor of Detroit: John C. Lodge (Republican)/Frank Ellsworth Doremus (Democrat)
- Mayor of Grand Rapids: William Oltman/Julius Tisch
- Mayor of Flint: William H. McKeighan/David R. Cuthbertson
- Mayor of Lansing: Silas F. Main/Alfred H. Doughty
- Mayor of Saginaw: Ben N. Mercer
- Mayor of Ann Arbor: George E. Lewis

=== Federal office holders ===
- U.S. Senator from Michigan: James J. Couzens (Republican)
- U.S. Senator from Michigan: Charles E. Townsend (Republican)/ Woodbridge N. Ferris (Democrat)
- House District 1: George P. Codd (Republican)/ Robert H. Clancy (Democrat)
- House District 2: Earl C. Michener (Republican)
- House District 3: John M. C. Smith (Republican)/ Arthur B. Williams (Republican)
- House District 4: John C. Ketcham (Republican)
- House District 5: Carl E. Mapes (Republican)
- House District 6: Patrick H. Kelley (Republican)/ Grant M. Hudson (Republican)
- House District 7: Louis C. Cramton (Republican)
- House District 8: Joseph W. Fordney (Republican)/ Bird J. Vincent (Republican)
- House District 9: James C. McLaughlin (Republican)
- House District 10: Roy O. Woodruff (Republican)
- House District 11: Frank D. Scott (Republican)
- House District 12: W. Frank James (Republican)
- House District 13: Vincent M. Brennan (Republican)/ Clarence J. McLeod (Republican)

== Population ==
In the 1920 United States census, Michigan was recorded as having a population of 3,668,412, ranking as the seventh most populous state in the country. By 1930, Michigan's population had increased by 32.0% to 4,842,325.

=== Cities ===
The following is a list of cities in Michigan with a population of at least 15,000 based on 1920 U.S. Census data. Historic census data from 1910 and 1930 is included to reflect trends in population increases or decreases.

1920 Rank	City	County	1910 Pop.	1920 Pop.	1930 Pop.	Change 1920-30
1	Detroit	Wayne	465,766	993,678	1,568,662	57.9%
2	Grand Rapids	Kent	112,571	137,634	168,592	22.5%
3	Flint	Genesee	38,550	91,599	156,492	70.8%
4	Saginaw	Saginaw	50,510	61,903	80,715	30.4%
5	Lansing	Ingham	31,229	57,327	78,397	36.8%
6	Hamtramck	Wayne	3,559	48,615	56,268	15.7%
7	Kalamazoo	Kalamazoo	39,437	48,487	54,786	13.0%
8	Jackson	Jackson	31,433	48,374	55,187	14.1%
9	Bay City	Bay	45,166	47,554	47,355	−0.4%
10	Highland Park	Wayne	4,120	46,499	52,959	13.9%
11	Muskegon	Muskegon	24,062	36,570	41,390	15.2%
12	Battle Creek	Calhoun	25,267	36,164	45,573	26.0%
13	Pontiac	Oakland	14,532	34,273	64,928	89.4%
14	Port Huron	St. Clair	18,863	25,944	31,361	20.9%
15	Ann Arbor	Washtenaw	14,817	19,516	26,944	38.1%
16	Ironwood	Gogebic	12,821	15,739	14,299	−9.1%

=== Boom cities of the 1920s ===
The 1920s saw an explosion of growth in the population of small cities near Detroit, with some communities growing more than three fold. Dearborn was the most extreme case, growing 20-fold from 2,470 to 50,358 persons.

1920 Rank	City	County	1910 Pop.	1920 Pop.	1930 Pop.	Change 1920-30
	Warren	Macomb	2,346	6,780	24,024	254.3%
	Royal Oak	Oakland	1,071	6,007	22,904	281.3%
	Ferndale	Oakland	--	2,640	20,855	690.0%
	Dearborn	Wayne	911	2,470	50,358	1,938.8%

=== Counties ===
The following is a list of counties in Michigan with populations of at least 40,000 based on 1920 U.S. Census data. Historic census data from 1910 and 1930 are included to reflect trends in population increases or decreases.

1920 Rank	County	Largest city	1910 Pop.	1920 Pop.	1930 Pop.	Change 1920-30
1	Wayne	Detroit	531,591	1,177,645	1,888,946	60.4%
2	Kent	Grand Rapids	159,145	183,041	240,511	31.4%
3	Genesee	Flint	64,555	125,668	211,641	68.4%
4	Saginaw	Saginaw	89,290	100,286	120,717	20.4%
5	Oakland	Pontiac	49,576	90,050	211,251	134.6%
6	Ingham	Lansing	53,310	81,554	116,587	43.0%
7	Calhoun	Battle Creek	56,638	72,918	87,043	19.4%
8	Houghton	Houghton	88,098	71,930	52,851	-26.5%
9	Jackson	Jackson	53,426	72,539	92,304	27.2%
10	Kalamazoo	Kalamazoo	60,327	71,225	91,368	28.3%
11	Bay	Bay City	68,238	69,548	69,474	-0.1%
12	Berrien	Niles	53,622	62,653	81,066	29.4%
13	Muskegon	Muskegon	40,577	62,362	84,630	35.7%
14	St. Clair	Port Huron	52,341	58,009	67,563	16.5%
15	Washtenaw	Ann Arbor	44,714	49,520	65,530	32.3%
16	Lenawee	Adrian	47,907	47,767	49,849	4.4%
17	Ottawa	Holland	45,301	47,660	54,858	15.1%
18	Marquette	Marquette	46,739	45,786	44,076	−3.7%

== Sports ==
=== Baseball ===
- 1921 Detroit Tigers season – Under player-manager Ty Cobb, the Tigers compiled a 71–82 record and finished third in the American League. The team's statistical leaders included Harry Heilmann with a .394 batting average, 19 home runs, and 139 RBIs, and Ty Cobb with 124 runs scored. The team's pitching leaders were Howard Ehmke 13 wins and Dutch Leonard with a 3.75 earned run average.

=== American football ===
- 1921 Michigan Wolverines football team – In their 21st season under head coach Fielding H. Yost, the Wolverines compiled a 5–1–1 record, outscored opponents 187–21, and finished fifth in the Big Ten.
- 1921 Michigan Agricultural Aggies football team – Under head coach Albert Barron, the Aggies compiled a 3–5 record and were outscored by opponents, 126 to 68.
- 1921 Western State Normal Hilltoppers football team – Under head coach William H. Spaulding, the Hilltoppers compiled a 6–2 record and outscored opponents by a total of 262 to 40.
- 1921 Michigan State Normal Normalites football team – Under head coach Joseph McCulloch, the Normalites compiled a record of 3–3 and outscored opponents by a total of 82 to 50.
- 1921 Detroit Titans football team – Under head coach James F. Duffy, the Titans compiled an 8–1 record and outscored opponents by a total of 245 to 24.
- 1921 Detroit Junior College football team – Under head coach David Holmes, the Detroit Junior College team compiled a 6–0–2 record and outscored opponents by a total of 165 to 0.
- 1921 Central Michigan Normalites football team – Under head coach Wallace Parker, Central Michigan compiled a 7–2–1 record.

=== Basketball ===
- 1920–21 Michigan Wolverines men's basketball team – Under head coach E. J. Mather, the Wolverines compiled an 18–4 record and tied for first in the Big Ten Conference.

== Chronology of events ==
=== January ===
- January 4 - Merlin Wiley resigned as Michigan Attorney General
- January 4 - A gunfight in downtown Detroit results in the death of Detroit police detective Daniel J. Couglin.
- January 5 - The announcement of a plan to purchase Isle Royale (later Isle Royale National Park) for $4 million to create a state park is met with opposition to the cost. The Detroit Free Press published front-page stories critical of the acquisition for six consecutive days. Support for the plan waned in face of the opposition.
- January 11 - Plans were announced for construction of the Book Cadillac Hotel in downtown Detroit.

=== May ===
- May 9 - Southeastern Michigan recorded record snow fall for the month of May

== Births ==
- January 1 - Milt Jackson, jazz vibraphonist, in Detroit
- March 6 - Ed McMahon, announcer on The Tonight Show Starring Johnny Carson (1962-1992), in Detroit
- April 16 - Vito Giacalone, capo of the Detroit organized crime family
- May 15 - Doris Dowling, actress (The Crimson Key), in Detroit
- May 18 - Don Lund, baseball player, in Detroit
- July 7 - Josephine Clay Ford, philanthropist and granddaughter of Henry Ford, in Dearborn
- August 11 - Jack O'Dell, civil rights activist and writer, in Detroit
- August 12 - Garry E. Brown, U.S. House of Representatives (1967-1979)
- November 6 - Robert P. Griffin, U.S. Senator (1966-1979), in Detroit
- 1923 - Mitchell Hooks, illustrator, in Detroit

== Deaths ==
- January - Daniel E. Soper, Michigan Secretary of State (1891) involved with the Michigan relics hoax, in Chattanooga, Tennessee
- April 17 - Fred M. Warner, Governor of Michigan (1905-1911), in Orlando, Florida
- November 23 - Oscar Marx, mayor of Detroit (1913-1918), in Detroit
- December 9 - Bill Donovan, Detroit Tigers pitcher (1903-1912), in Forsyth, New York
- 1923 - Marvin H. Chamberlain, mayor of Detroit (1886-1887), in Woodstock Township, Michigan
