= 1920 in Michigan =

- Decades: 1900s; 1910s; 1920s; 1930s; 1940s
- See also: History of Michigan; Historical outline of Michigan; List of years in Michigan; 1920 in the United States

Events from the year 1920 in Michigan.

== Office holders ==
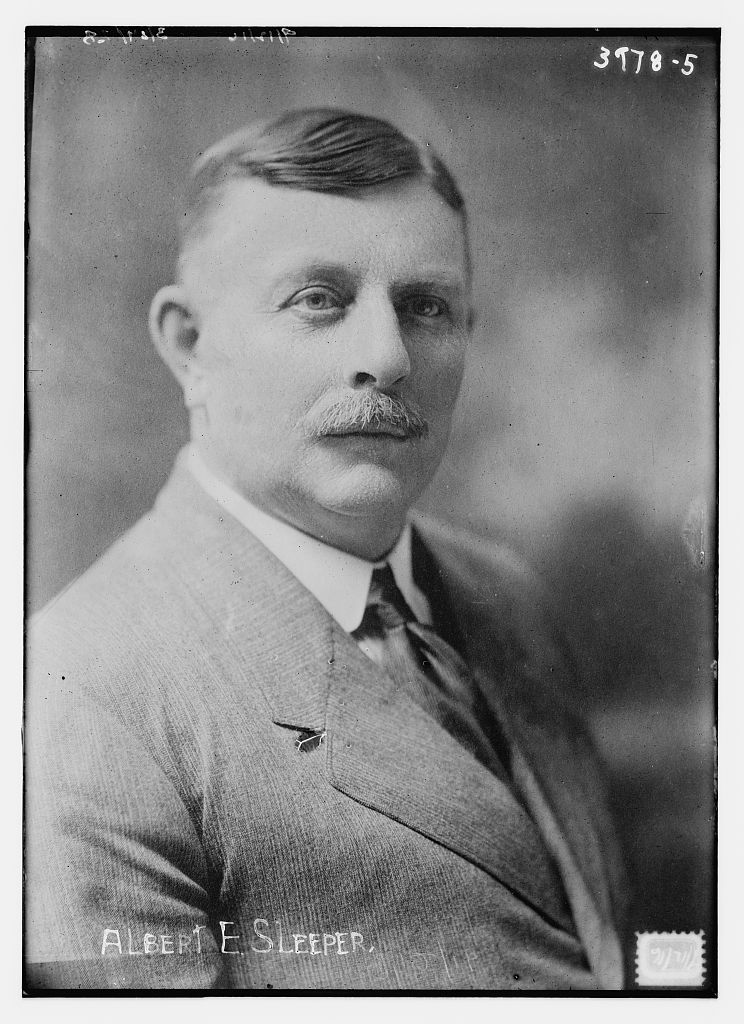
Gov. Sleeper

=== State office holders ===
- Governor of Michigan: Albert Sleeper (Republican)
- Lieutenant Governor of Michigan: Luren D. Dickinson (Republican)
- Michigan Attorney General: Alexander J. Groesbeck (Republican)
- Michigan Secretary of State: Coleman C. Vaughan (Republican)
- Speaker of the Michigan House of Representatives: Thomas Read (Republican)
- Chief Justice, Michigan Supreme Court: Joseph B. Moore

=== Mayors of major cities ===
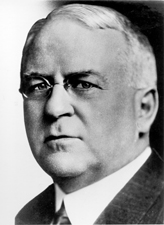
Mayor Couzens

- Mayor of Detroit: James J. Couzens (Republican)
- Mayor of Grand Rapids: Christian Gallmeyer/John McNabb
- Mayor of Flint: George C. Kellar/Edwin W. Atwood
- Mayor of Lansing: Benjamin A. Kyes
- Mayor of Saginaw: Ben N. Mercer
- Mayor of Ann Arbor: Ernst M. Wurster

=== Federal office holders ===
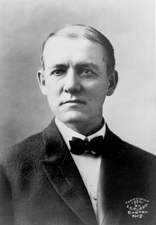
Sen. Townsend

- U.S. Senator from Michigan: Truman Handy Newberry (Republican)
- U.S. Senator from Michigan: Charles E. Townsend (Republican)
- House District 1: Frank Ellsworth Doremus (Democrat)
- House District 2: Earl C. Michener (Republican)
- House District 3: John M. C. Smith (Republican)
- House District 4: Edward L. Hamilton (Republican)
- House District 5: Carl E. Mapes (Republican)
- House District 6: Patrick H. Kelley (Republican)
- House District 7: Louis C. Cramton (Republican)
- House District 8: Joseph W. Fordney (Republican)
- House District 9: James C. McLaughlin (Republican)
- House District 10: Gilbert A. Currie (Republican)
- House District 11: Frank D. Scott (Republican)
- House District 12: W. Frank James (Republican)
- House District 13: Charles Archibald Nichols (Republican)

== Population ==
In the 1920 United States census, Michigan was recorded as having a population of 3,668,412, ranking as the seventh most populous state in the country. By 1930, Michigan's population had increased by 32.0% to 4,842,325.

=== Cities ===
The following is a list of cities in Michigan with a population of at least 15,000 based on 1920 U.S. Census data. Historic census data from 1910 and 1930 is included to reflect trends in population increases or decreases.

1920 Rank	City	County	1910 Pop.	1920 Pop.	1930 Pop.	Change 1920-30
1	Detroit	Wayne	465,766	993,678	1,568,662	57.9%
2	Grand Rapids	Kent	112,571	137,634	168,592	22.5%
3	Flint	Genesee	38,550	91,599	156,492	70.8%
4	Saginaw	Saginaw	50,510	61,903	80,715	30.4%
5	Lansing	Ingham	31,229	57,327	78,397	36.8%
6	Hamtramck	Wayne	3,559	48,615	56,268	15.7%
7	Kalamazoo	Kalamazoo	39,437	48,487	54,786	13.0%
8	Jackson	Jackson	31,433	48,374	55,187	14.1%
9	Bay City	Bay	45,166	47,554	47,355	−0.4%
10	Highland Park	Wayne	4,120	46,499	52,959	13.9%
11	Muskegon	Muskegon	24,062	36,570	41,390	15.2%
12	Battle Creek	Calhoun	25,267	36,164	45,573	26.0%
13	Pontiac	Oakland	14,532	34,273	64,928	89.4%
14	Port Huron	St. Clair	18,863	25,944	31,361	20.9%
15	Ann Arbor	Washtenaw	14,817	19,516	26,944	38.1%
16	Ironwood	Gogebic	12,821	15,739	14,299	−9.1%

=== Boom cities of the 1920s ===
The 1920s saw explosive growth in the population of small cities near Detroit, with some communities growing more than three fold. Dearborn was the most extreme case, growing 20-fold from 2,470 to 50,358 persons.

1920 Rank	City	County	1910 Pop.	1920 Pop.	1930 Pop.	Change 1920-30
	Warren	Macomb	2,346	6,780	24,024	254.3%
	Royal Oak	Oakland	1,071	6,007	22,904	281.3%
	Ferndale	Oakland	--	2,640	20,855	690.0%
	Dearborn	Wayne	911	2,470	50,358	1,938.8%

=== Counties ===
The following is a list of counties in Michigan with populations of at least 40,000 based on 1920 U.S. Census data. Historic census data from 1910 and 1930 are included to reflect trends in population increases or decreases.

1920 Rank	County	Largest city	1910 Pop.	1920 Pop.	1930 Pop.	Change 1920-30
1	Wayne	Detroit	531,591	1,177,645	1,888,946	60.4%
2	Kent	Grand Rapids	159,145	183,041	240,511	31.4%
3	Genesee	Flint	64,555	125,668	211,641	68.4%
4	Saginaw	Saginaw	89,290	100,286	120,717	20.4%
5	Oakland	Pontiac	49,576	90,050	211,251	134.6%
6	Ingham	Lansing	53,310	81,554	116,587	43.0%
7	Calhoun	Battle Creek	56,638	72,918	87,043	19.4%
8	Houghton	Houghton	88,098	71,930	52,851	-26.5%
9	Jackson	Jackson	53,426	72,539	92,304	27.2%
10	Kalamazoo	Kalamazoo	60,327	71,225	91,368	28.3%
11	Bay	Bay City	68,238	69,548	69,474	-0.1%
12	Berrien	Niles	53,622	62,653	81,066	29.4%
13	Muskegon	Muskegon	40,577	62,362	84,630	35.7%
14	St. Clair	Port Huron	52,341	58,009	67,563	16.5%
15	Washtenaw	Ann Arbor	44,714	49,520	65,530	32.3%
16	Lenawee	Adrian	47,907	47,767	49,849	4.4%
17	Ottawa	Holland	45,301	47,660	54,858	15.1%
18	Marquette	Marquette	46,739	45,786	44,076	−3.7%

== Sports ==
=== Baseball ===
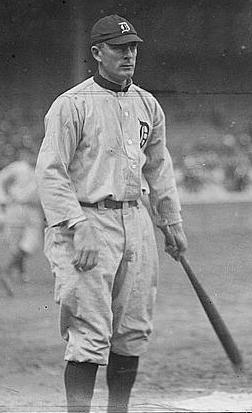
Bobby Veach

- 1920 Detroit Tigers season – Under manager Hughie Jennings, the Tigers finished seventh in the American League with a record of 61–93. The team's statistical leaders included Ty Cobb with a .334 batting average, Bobby Veach with 113 RBIs and 65 extra-base hits, and Howard Ehmke with 15 wins and a 3.25 earned run average.
- 1920 Michigan Wolverines baseball season - Under head coach Carl Lundgren, the Wolverines compiled a 17–6–2 record and won the Big Ten Conference championship. Slicker Parks was the team captain.

=== American football ===
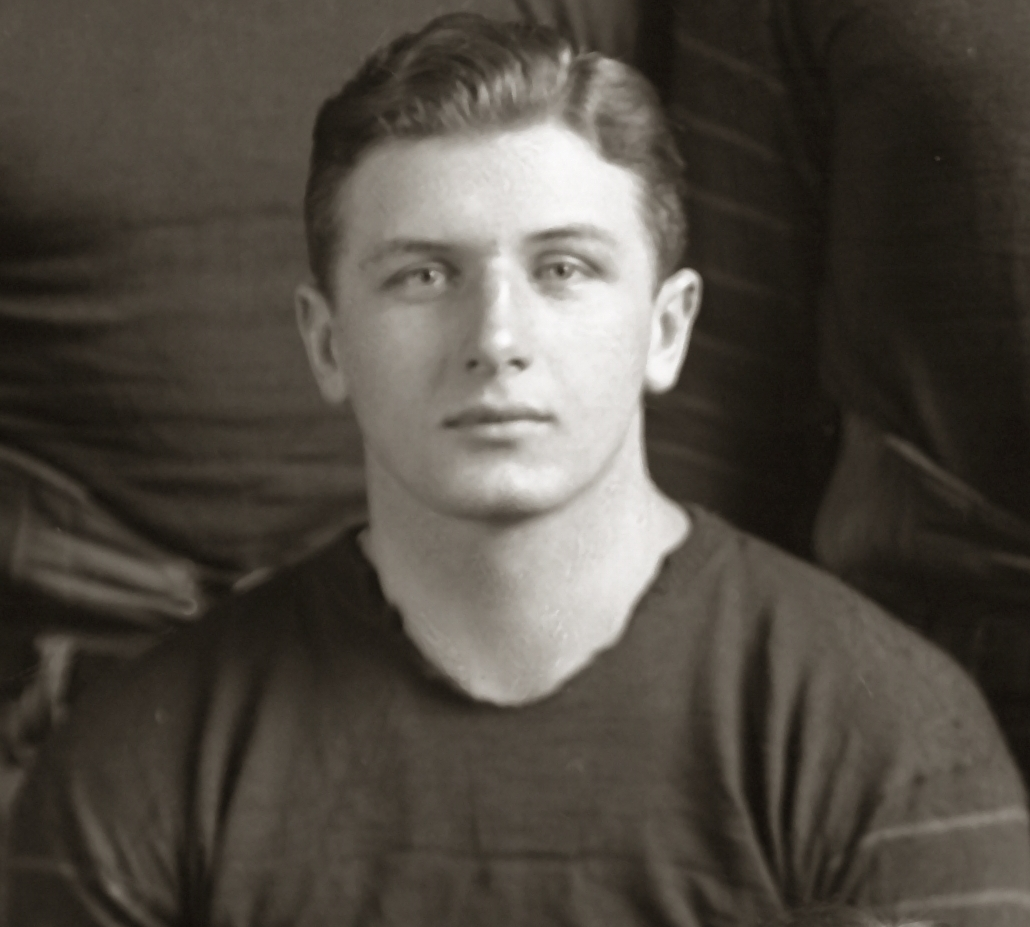
Ernie Vick

- 1920 Michigan Wolverines football team – Under head coach Fielding H. Yost, the Wolverines compiled a 5–2 record. Center Ernie Vick was selected as a first-team All-Big Ten Conference player.
- 1920 Michigan Agricultural Aggies football team – Under head coach Potsy Clark, the Aggies compiled a 4–6 record and outscored their opponents 270 to 166, including a 109 to 0 victory over Olivet College on October 30, 1920.
- 1920 Michigan State Normal Normalites football team – Under head coach Elton Rynearson, the Normalites compiled a record of 6–2 and outscored all opponents by a combined total of 132 to 86.
- 1920 Detroit Titans football team – The Titans shut out six of ten opponents, outscored all opponents by a combined total of 279 to 32, and finished with an 8–2 record under head coach James F. Duffy.
- 1920 Central Michigan Normalites football team – Under head coach Joe Simmons, the Central Michigan football team compiled a 4–3–1 record, shut out four of eight opponents, and outscored all opponents by a combined total of 166 to 41.
- 1920 Western State Hilltoppers football team – Under head coach William H. Spaulding, the Hilltoppers compiled a 3–4 record and were outscored by their opponents, 131 to 119.

=== Basketball ===
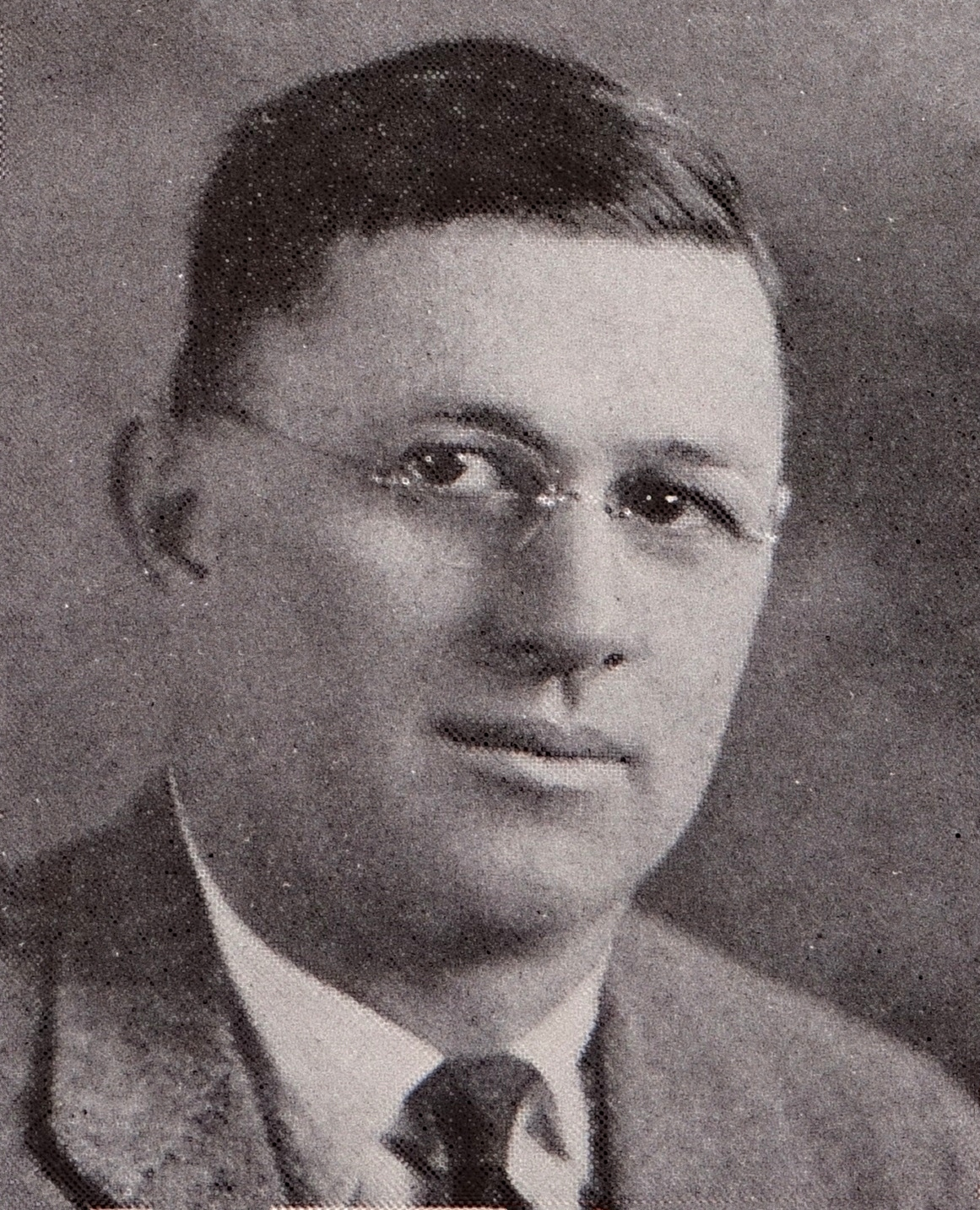
E. J. Mather

- 1919–20 Michigan Wolverines men's basketball team – The team compiled a record of 10–13. E. J. Mather was in his first year as the team's coach, and Ralph O. Rychener was the team captain.

=== Other ===
- 1919–20 Michigan College of Mines men's ice hockey team – In the first season of college ice hockey in the state, the Michigan College of Mines (later renamed Michigan Technological University) team compiled a 1–2–1 record under head coach E. R. Lovel.

== Chronology of events ==
=== November ===
General Motors Building

- November 27 - The Durant Building in Detroit, later renamed the General Motors Building and eventually Cadillac Place, was opened for business as the new headquarters for General Motors.

== Births ==
- January 15 - Steve Gromek, Major League Baseball pitcher (1941–1957), in Hamtramck, Michigan
- January 22 - Margaret Hillert, author of more than 80 children's books, including the Dear Dragon series, in Saginaw, Michigan
- February 8 - Bob Bemer, computer scientist known for his work on the specifications for COBOL and the ASCII character codeset, in Sault Ste. Marie, Michigan
- February 18 - Eddie Slovik, U.S. soldier executed for desertion during World War II, in Detroit
- February 23 - Hall Overton, composer, jazz pianist and music teacher, in Bangor, Michigan
- April 9 - Art Van Damme, jazz accordionist, in Norway, Michigan
- April 22 - Alfred Burt, jazz musician who composed music for 15 Christmas carols, in Marquette, Michigan
- April 29 - David M. Nelson, football coach and Secretary-Editor of the NCAA Football Rules Committee for 29 years who was inducted into the College Football Hall of Fame, in Detroit
- May 31 - Francis P. Hammerberg, U.S. Navy diver who received the Medal of Honor posthumously for rescuing two fellow divers, in Daggett, Michigan
- July 13 - Don Ralke, prolific music arranger and composer for film and television and producer of the "Golden Throats" recordings, in Battle Creek, Michigan
- July 20 - Dominic Jacobetti, longest serving Michigan state legislator, served in state house from 1955 to 1994, in Negaunee, Michigan
- July 30 - Marie Tharp, geologist and oceanographic cartographer who discovered the Mid-Atlantic Ridge, which led to acceptance of the theories of plate tectonics and continental drift, in Ypsilanti, Michigan
- August 19 - Ralph Story, television and radio personality best known as the host of The $64,000 Challenge, in Kalamazoo, Michigan
- September 1 - Charline White, first African-American woman to be elected to the Michigan Legislature, in Atlanta, Georgia
- September 13 - Charles Smith, actor (The Shop Around the Corner, The Major and the Minor) in Flint, Michigan
- October 11 - James Aloysius Hickey, Roman Catholic Cardinal and Archbishop of Washington, D.C. (1980–2000), in Midland, Michigan
- October 21 - Ruth Terry, singer and actress, in Benton Harbor, Michigan
- November 12 - Richard Quine, stage, film and radio actor, and television director, in Detroit

=== Gallery of 1920 births ===
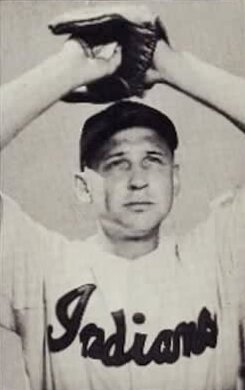
Steve Gromek

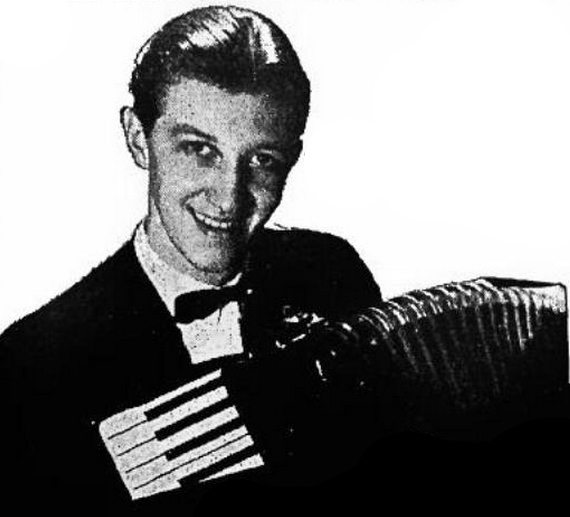
Art Van Damme

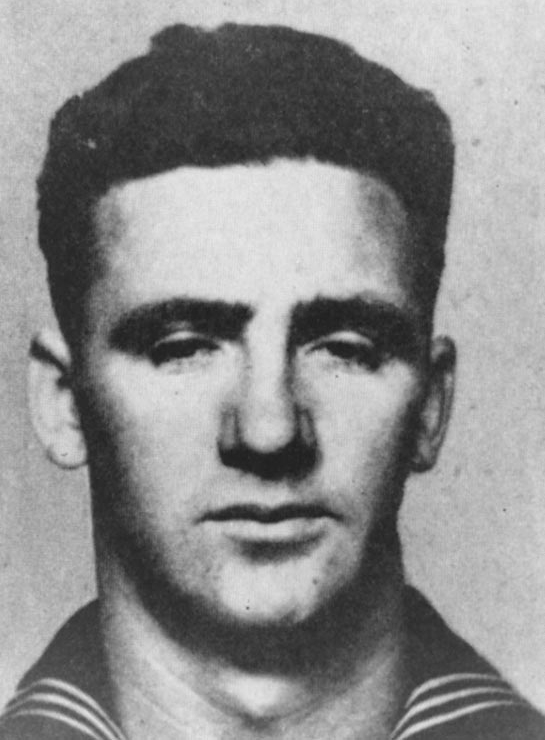
Francis P. Hammerberg

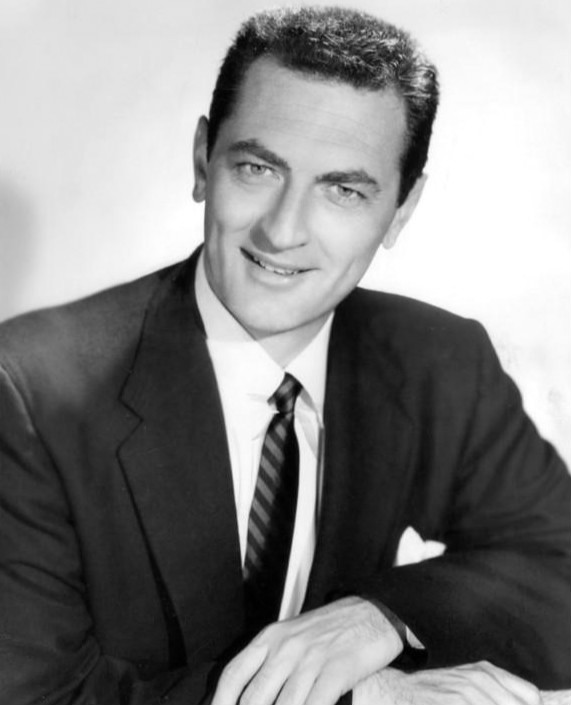
Ralph Story

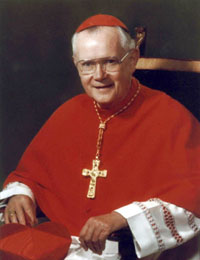
James Aloysius Hickey

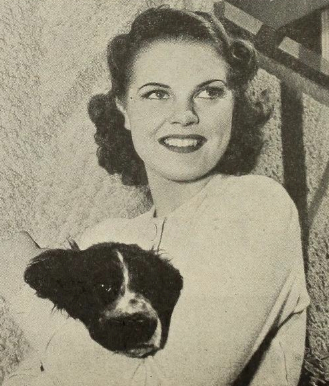
Ruth Terry

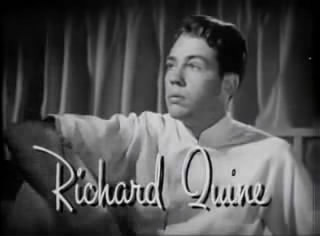
Richard Quine

== Deaths ==
- January 14 - John Francis Dodge, automobile manufacturing pioneer and co-founder of Dodge Brothers Company, at age 55 in New York City
- January 21 - Ferris S. Fitch Jr., Michigan Superintendent of Public Instruction (1891–1892), at age 66 in Detroit
- February 4 - Ed Siever, Major League Baseball pitcher (1901–1908) and AL ERA leader (1902), at age 44 in Detroit
- April 2 - Matty McIntyre, Major League Baseball outfielder (1901–1912) led AL in runs scored (1908), at age 39 in Detroit
- July 21 - Otto Kirchner, Michigan Attorney General (1877–1880), at age 74 in Detroit
- December 10 - Horace Elgin Dodge, automobile manufacturing pioneer and co-founder of Dodge Brothers Company, in Palm Beach, Florida
- December 14 - George Gipp, Notre Dame football player and native of Laurium, Michigan, in South Bend, Indiana

=== Gallery of 1920 deaths ===
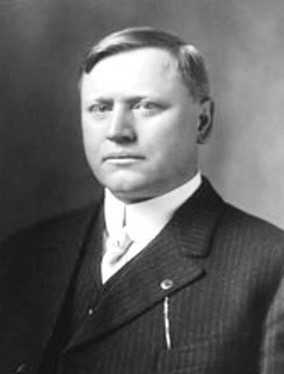
John Francis Dodge

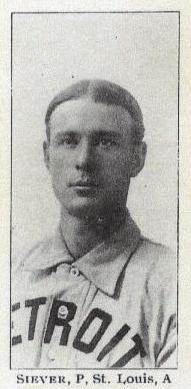
Ed Siever

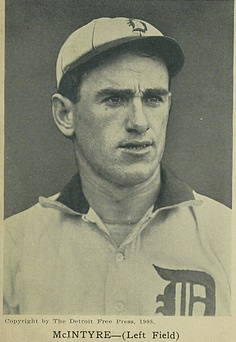
Matty McIntyre

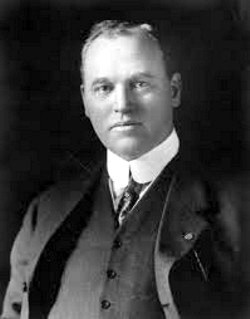
Horace Elgin Dodge

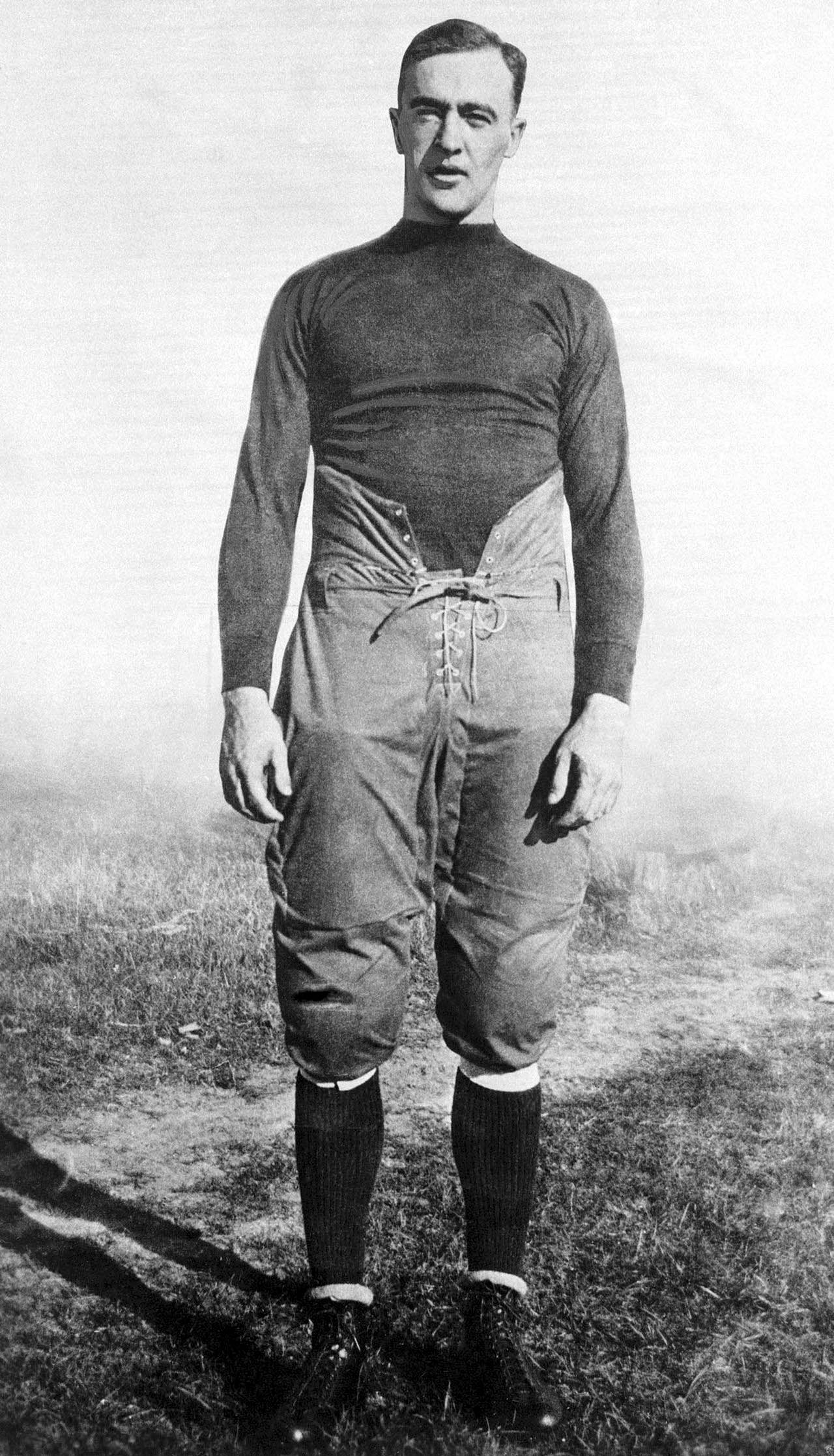
George Gipp

== See also ==
- History of Michigan
- History of Detroit
