= 1922 in Michigan =

- Decades: 1900s; 1910s; 1920s; 1930s; 1940s
- See also: History of Michigan; Historical outline of Michigan; List of years in Michigan; 1922 in the United States

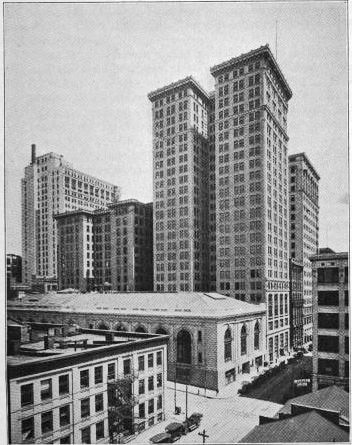
Detroit Financial District, c. 1922

Events from the year 1922 in Michigan.

Major events occurring during 1922 in Michigan included: a multi-day debate in the U.S. Senate over the seating of Michigan Senator Truman Newberry who stood accused of misconduct undermining his election to the Senate; the re-election of Alex J. Groesbeck as Governor of Michigan; the election of Woodbridge N. Ferris, the first Democrat to represent Michigan in the U.S. Senate in 70 years; the resignation of Sen. Newberry in November 1922 and his replacement with Detroit Mayor James J. Couzens; the 1922 Michigan Wolverines football team, led by All-Americans Harry Kipke, Bernard Kirk, and Paul G. Goebel, going through the season undefeated; and the December 1922 death of Michigan star Bernard Kirk due to injuries sustained in an automobile crash.

At the end of the year, the Detroit Free Press published a list of the principal events occurring in that city during 1922. The principal events included: laying of the cornerstone on the Detroit Masonic Temple; opening of the new Temple Beth El; the opening of the Capitol Theater (later renamed the Detroit Opera House); voters approval of the city's purchase of the Detroit United Railway; the Dodge Brothers' gift of 11 new parks to the state; the opening of bank offices at the First National Bank building; announcement of plans to construct a new Roman Catholic cathedral; the Detroit Tigers' third-place finish in the American League; the final run of the Detroit Fire Department's fire horses on April 10; the victory of Jesse G. Vincent's Packard Chris-Craft in the annual Gold Cup motorboat race; and the launching of the USS Detroit.

== Office holders ==
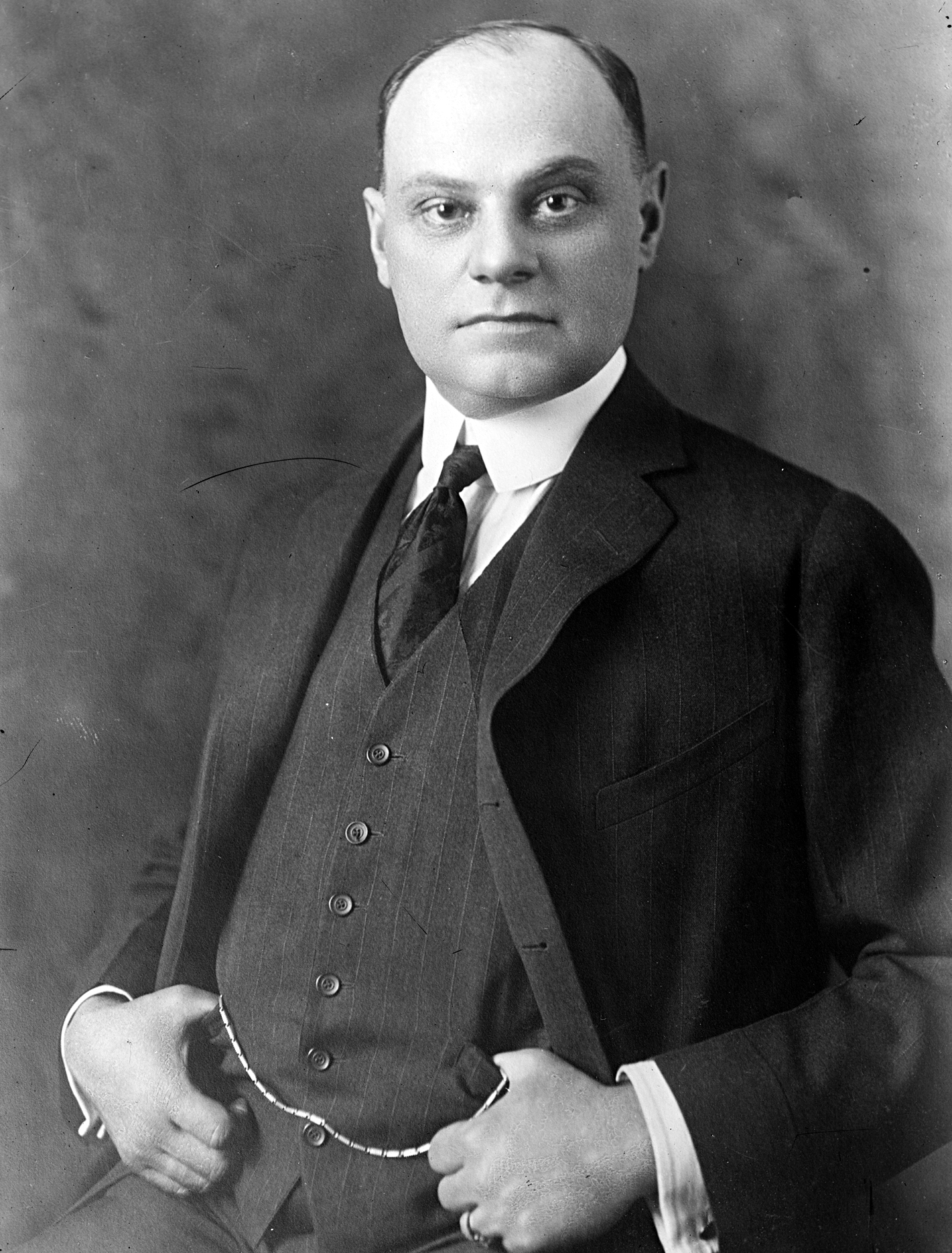
Gov. Groesbeck

=== State office holders ===
- Governor of Michigan: Alex J. Groesbeck (Republican)
- Lieutenant Governor of Michigan: Thomas Read (Republican)
- Michigan Attorney General: Merlin Wiley (Republican)
- Michigan Secretary of State: Charles J. DeLand (Republican)
- Speaker of the Michigan House of Representatives: Fred L. Warner (Republican)
- Chief Justice, Michigan Supreme Court: Grant Fellows

=== Mayors of major cities ===
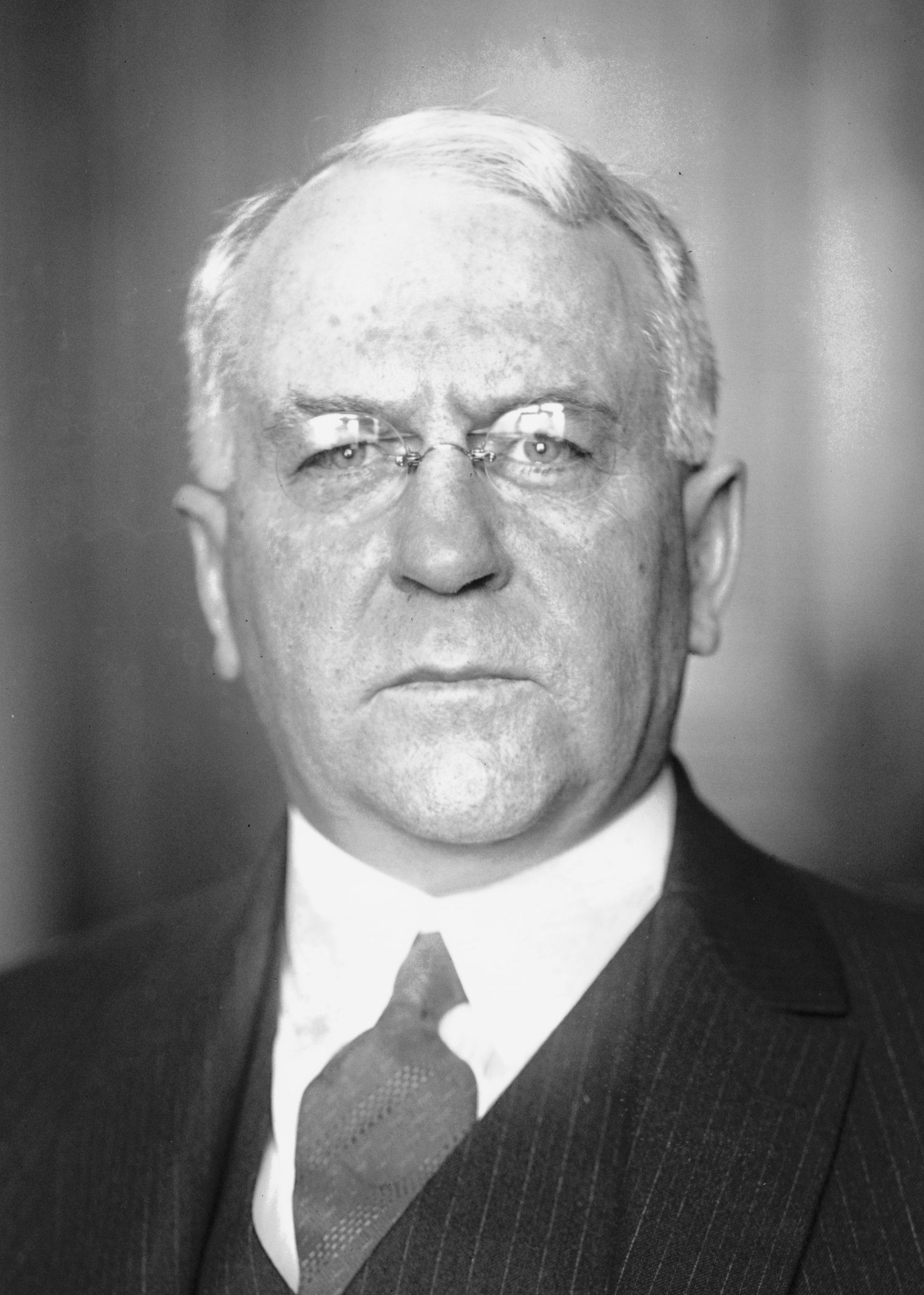
Mayor Couzens

- Mayor of Detroit: James J. Couzens/John C. Lodge
- Mayor of Grand Rapids: John McNabb
- Mayor of Flint: William H. McKeighan
- Mayor of Lansing: Silas F. Main
- Mayor of Saginaw: Ben N. Mercer
- Mayor of Ann Arbor: George E. Lewis

=== Federal office holders ===
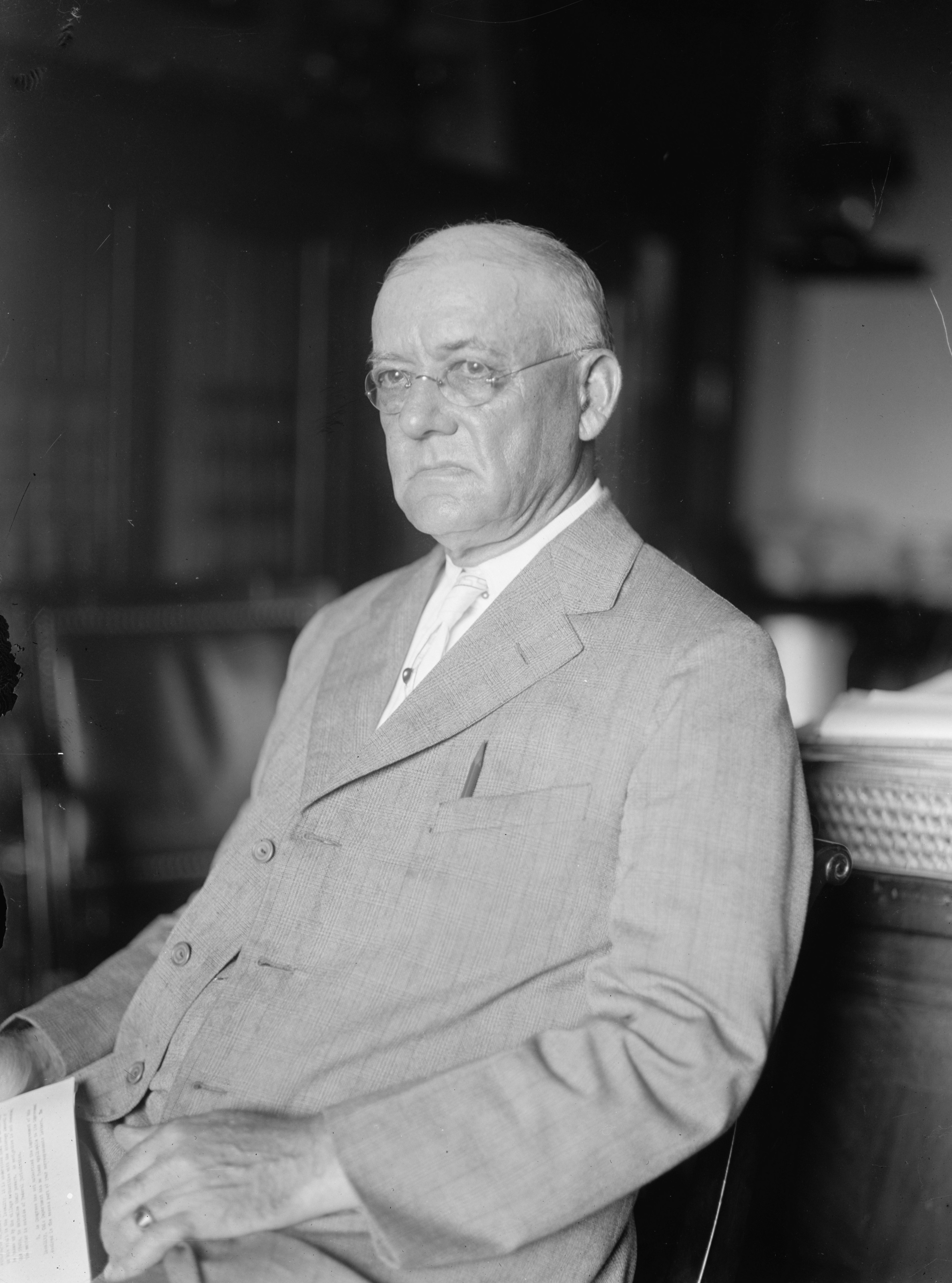
Sen. Townsend

- U.S. Senator from Michigan: Truman Handy Newberry (Republican)/ James J. Couzens
- U.S. Senator from Michigan: Charles E. Townsend (Republican)
- House District 1: George P. Codd (Republican)
- House District 2: Earl C. Michener (Republican)
- House District 3: John M. C. Smith (Republican)
- House District 4: John C. Ketcham (Republican)
- House District 5: Carl E. Mapes (Republican)
- House District 6: Patrick H. Kelley (Republican)
- House District 7: Louis C. Cramton (Republican)
- House District 8: Joseph W. Fordney (Republican)
- House District 9: James C. McLaughlin (Republican)
- House District 10: Roy O. Woodruff (Republican)
- House District 11: Frank D. Scott (Republican)
- House District 12: W. Frank James (Republican)
- House District 13: Vincent M. Brennan (Republican)

== Population ==
In the 1920 United States census, Michigan was recorded as having a population of 3,668,412, ranking as the seventh most populous state in the country. By 1930, Michigan's population had increased by 32.0% to 4,842,325.

=== Cities ===
The following is a list of cities in Michigan with a population of at least 15,000 based on 1920 U.S. Census data. Historic census data from 1910 and 1930 is included to reflect trends in population increases or decreases.

1920 Rank	City	County	1910 Pop.	1920 Pop.	1930 Pop.	Change 1920-30
1	Detroit	Wayne	465,766	993,678	1,568,662	57.9%
2	Grand Rapids	Kent	112,571	137,634	168,592	22.5%
3	Flint	Genesee	38,550	91,599	156,492	70.8%
4	Saginaw	Saginaw	50,510	61,903	80,715	30.4%
5	Lansing	Ingham	31,229	57,327	78,397	36.8%
6	Hamtramck	Wayne	3,559	48,615	56,268	15.7%
7	Kalamazoo	Kalamazoo	39,437	48,487	54,786	13.0%
8	Jackson	Jackson	31,433	48,374	55,187	14.1%
9	Bay City	Bay	45,166	47,554	47,355	−0.4%
10	Highland Park	Wayne	4,120	46,499	52,959	13.9%
11	Muskegon	Muskegon	24,062	36,570	41,390	15.2%
12	Battle Creek	Calhoun	25,267	36,164	45,573	26.0%
13	Pontiac	Oakland	14,532	34,273	64,928	89.4%
14	Port Huron	St. Clair	18,863	25,944	31,361	20.9%
15	Ann Arbor	Washtenaw	14,817	19,516	26,944	38.1%
16	Ironwood	Gogebic	12,821	15,739	14,299	−9.1%

=== Boom cities of the 1920s ===
The 1920s saw an explosion of growth in the population of small cities near Detroit, with some communities growing more than three fold. Dearborn was the most extreme case, growing 20-fold from 2,470 to 50,358 persons.

1920 Rank	City	County	1910 Pop.	1920 Pop.	1930 Pop.	Change 1920-30
	Warren	Macomb	2,346	6,780	24,024	254.3%
	Royal Oak	Oakland	1,071	6,007	22,904	281.3%
	Ferndale	Oakland	--	2,640	20,855	690.0%
	Dearborn	Wayne	911	2,470	50,358	1,938.8%

=== Counties ===
The following is a list of counties in Michigan with populations of at least 40,000 based on 1920 U.S. Census data. Historic census data from 1910 and 1930 are included to reflect trends in population increases or decreases.

1920 Rank	County	Largest city	1910 Pop.	1920 Pop.	1930 Pop.	Change 1920-30
1	Wayne	Detroit	531,591	1,177,645	1,888,946	60.4%
2	Kent	Grand Rapids	159,145	183,041	240,511	31.4%
3	Genesee	Flint	64,555	125,668	211,641	68.4%
4	Saginaw	Saginaw	89,290	100,286	120,717	20.4%
5	Oakland	Pontiac	49,576	90,050	211,251	134.6%
6	Ingham	Lansing	53,310	81,554	116,587	43.0%
7	Calhoun	Battle Creek	56,638	72,918	87,043	19.4%
8	Houghton	Houghton	88,098	71,930	52,851	-26.5%
9	Jackson	Jackson	53,426	72,539	92,304	27.2%
10	Kalamazoo	Kalamazoo	60,327	71,225	91,368	28.3%
11	Bay	Bay City	68,238	69,548	69,474	-0.1%
12	Berrien	Niles	53,622	62,653	81,066	29.4%
13	Muskegon	Muskegon	40,577	62,362	84,630	35.7%
14	St. Clair	Port Huron	52,341	58,009	67,563	16.5%
15	Washtenaw	Ann Arbor	44,714	49,520	65,530	32.3%
16	Lenawee	Adrian	47,907	47,767	49,849	4.4%
17	Ottawa	Holland	45,301	47,660	54,858	15.1%
18	Marquette	Marquette	46,739	45,786	44,076	−3.7%

== Sports ==
=== Baseball ===
- 1922 Detroit Tigers season – Under player-manager Ty Cobb, the Tigers compiled a 79–75 record and finished third in the American League. The team's statistical leaders included Cobb with a .401 batting average, Harry Heilmann with 21 home runs, Bobby Veach with 126 RBIs, and Lu Blue with 131 runs scored. Herman Pillette led the pitching staff with a 19–12 record and 2.85 earned run average.
- 1922 Michigan Wolverines baseball season – The Wolverines compiled a 21–6 record.

=== American football ===
- 1922 Michigan Wolverines football team – In their 22nd season under head coach Fielding H. Yost, the Wolverines compiled a 6–0–1 record, outscored opponents 183–13, and tied with Iowa for the Big Ten championship.
- 1922 Western State Hilltoppers football team – Under first-year head coach Milton Olander, the Hilltoppers compiled a perfect 6–0 record, shut out every opponent, and outscored opponents by a total of 160 to 0.
- 1922 Michigan Agricultural Aggies football team – Under head coach Albert Barron, the Aggies compiled a 3–5–2 record and were outscored by opponents, 135 to 111.
- 1922 Michigan State Normal Normalites football team – Under head coach Joseph McCulloch, the Normalites compiled a record of 3–2–2 and outscored opponents by a total of 31 to 28.
- 1922 Detroit Titans football team – Under head coach James F. Duffy, the Titans compiled a 7–2–1 record and outscored opponents by a total of 116 to 54.
- 1922 Central Michigan Normalites football team – Under head coach Wallace Parker, Central Michigan compiled a 6–0–2 record, shut out six of eight opponents, and outscored all opponents, 179 to 11.

=== Basketball ===
- 1921–22 Michigan Wolverines men's basketball team – Under head coach E. J. Mather, the Wolverines compiled a 15–4 record and finished second in the Big Ten Conference.

== Chronology of events ==
=== January ===
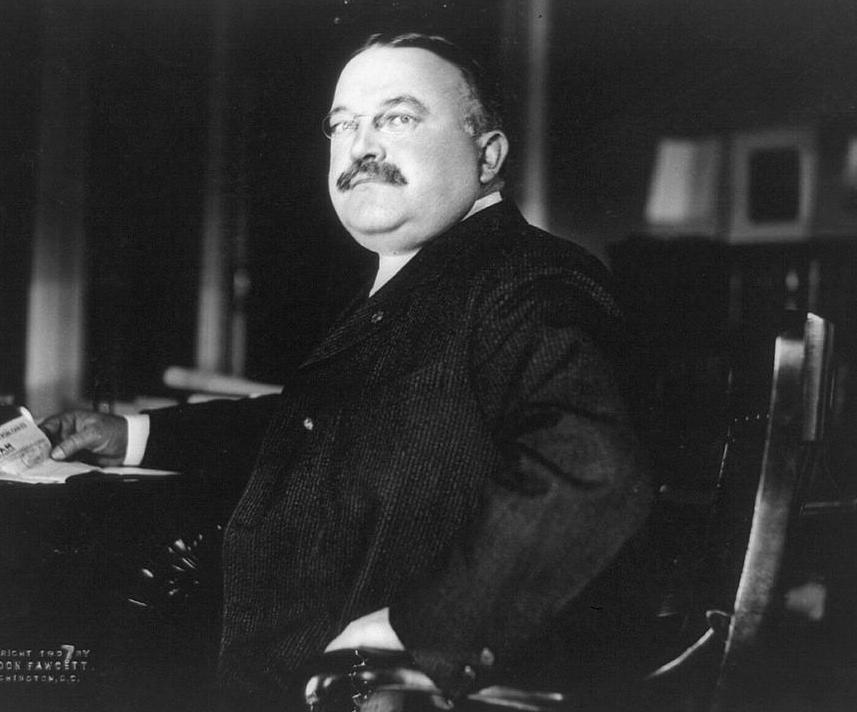
Truman Newberry

- January 6–12 - Members of the U.S. Senate debated for a week over the seating of Michigan Senator Truman Newberry. Newberry was charged with misconduct undermining the integrity of his 1918 election victory over Henry Ford. See Newberry v. United States. The proceedings included a speech by Newberry emotionally denying all wrongdoing and cross-examination of Newberry by Democratic Senators. On January 12, the Senate voted narrowly (46 to 41) to seat Newberry.
- January 7 - The 1922 lineup of automobiles, consisting of 400 models from 42 makers, went on display at the 22nd annual national automobile show in New York City. Prices of the new models ranged from $525 to $11,000.
- January 9 - Wayne County approved the expenditure of $3 million to lay 50 miles of concrete highway and to replace bridges.
- January 12 - Detroit's Capitol Theater, a movie palace on Broadway at Grand Circus Park, opened. A crowd of 4,500 attended on opening night. The film was accompanied by an orchestra of 35 musicians conducted by Eduard Werner. The theater was later renamed the Detroit Opera House.
- January 19 - A spokesman for the Dodge estate confirmed that Mrs. Horace Dodge was the owner of a pearl necklace that had belonged to Catherine the Great. The necklace was purchased by Horace Dodge for $825,000 shortly before his death in 1920.

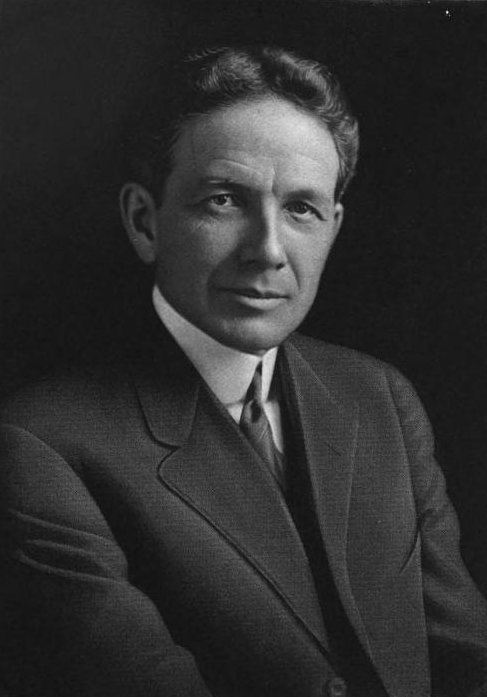
Will Durant

- January 21 - The Detroit automobile show opened with the display of 300 new automobiles.

=== February ===
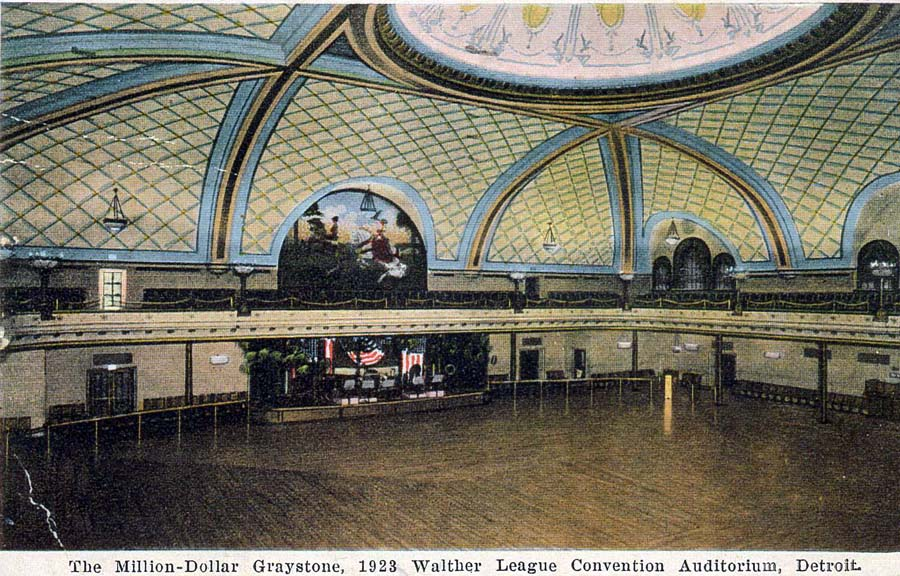
Graystone Ballroom

- February 1 - Congressman Vincent M. Brennan of Detroit presented a proposal to the House Ways and Means Committee to legalize beer and light wines. Brennan announced three months later that he would not seek reelection.
- February 4 - Henry Ford purchased the bankrupt Lincoln Motor Company for $8 million and announced that it would immediately reopen the plant. The plant reopened two days later and received $1 million in orders, reflecting confidence in the company's new management. Days later, a public dispute arose between Ford and Lincoln's receiver as to whether Ford had purchased only the physical plant or had also acquired the patents, copyright, trademark, and negotiable papers.
- February 15 - William C. Durant announced that his new company, Durant Motors, would be releasing a four-cylinder, five-passenger car at a price of $348.
- February 24 - Detroit police raided the Plaza Theater at 11631 E Jefferson Ave to stop the display of an "indecent" film to 1,500 men attending the showing arranged by a fraternal organization.
- February 27 - The Graystone Ballroom opened in Detroit at 4245 Woodward Avenue. A fire broke out at the ballroom on May 11 when an overcharge of flash powder from a photographer's camera set decorations on fire. The fire caused a panic to the 1,400 persons in attendance, including Governor Groesbeck.

=== March ===
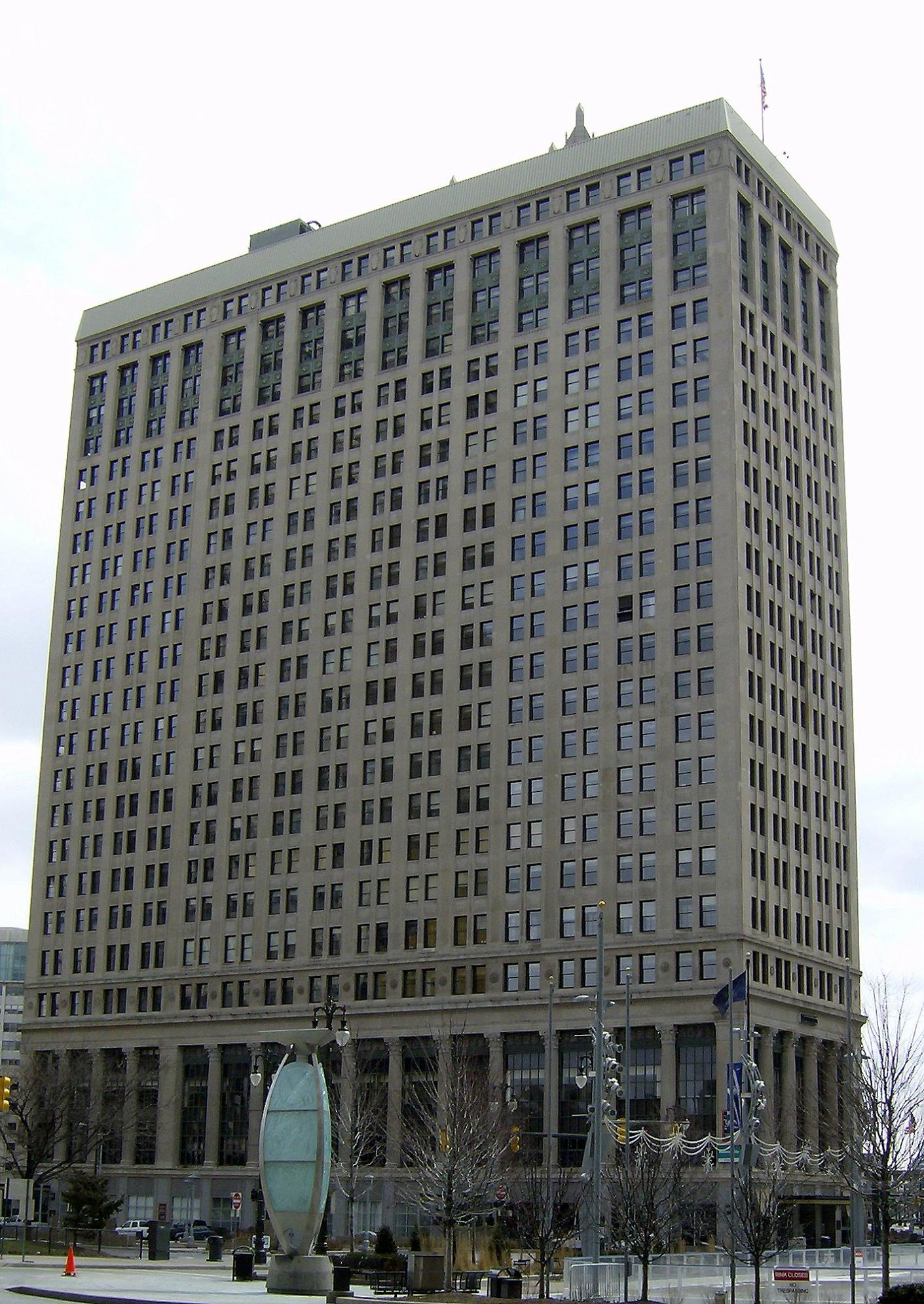
First National Bank Building

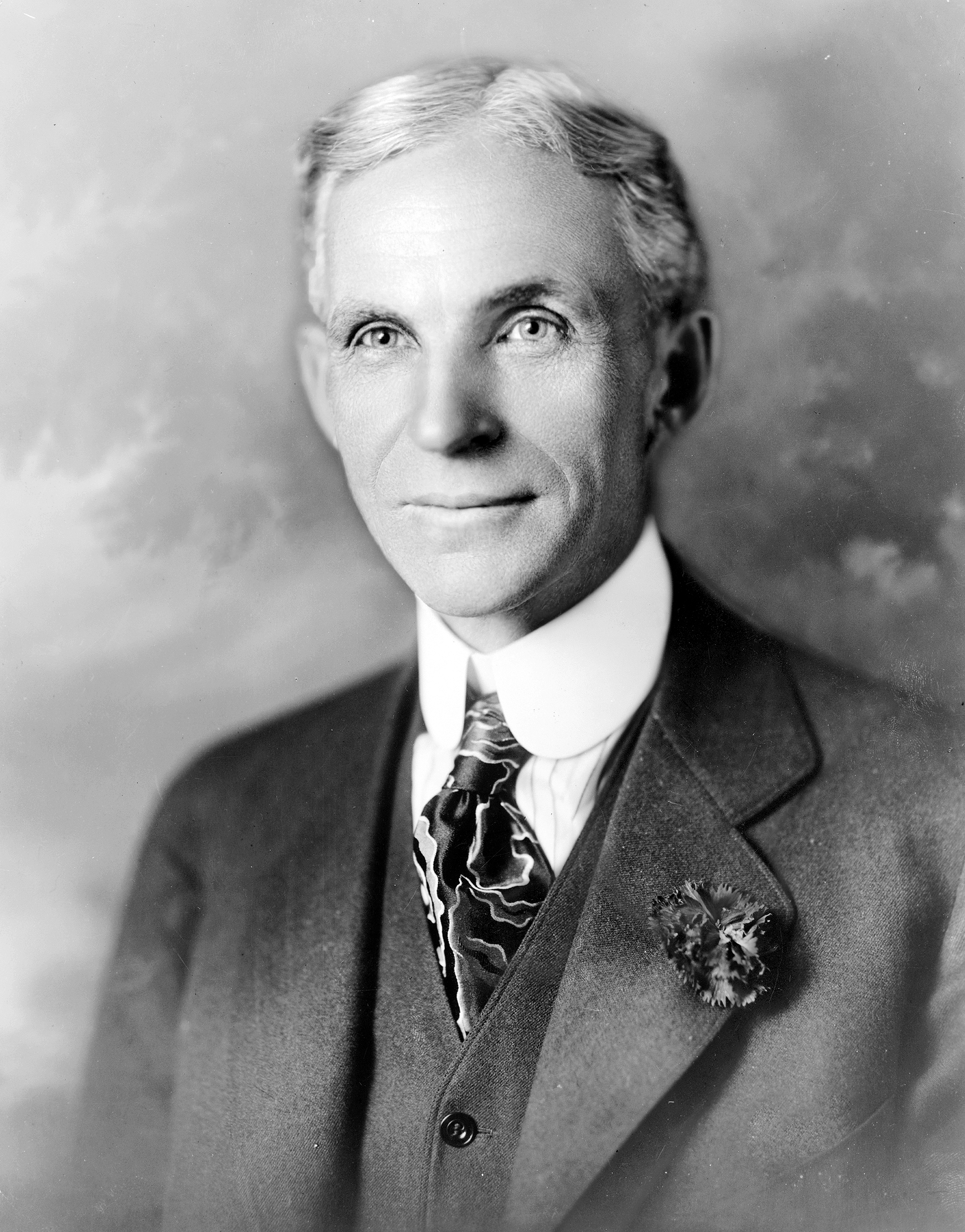
Henry Ford announces 40-hour work week

- March-April 1933 - John Duval Dodge, 24-year-old son of automobile manufacturing pioneer John Francis Dodge, faced charges in Detroit and Kalamazoo of speeding, driving while intoxicated, and transporting and distributing liquor. He was found guilty on speeding and liquor charges but acquitted of driving while intoxicated. He also faced a civil suit for running over a child with his automobile. Dodge's legal proceedings remained on the front page of the state's newspapers for much of the months of March and April.
- March 9 - Unpersuaded by pleas from Detroit's jazz devotees and bobbed-hair flappers girls, Mayor James J. Couzens ordered the revocation of the Crystal Palace dance hall on grounds that it was a rendezvous site for improper women and that improper dancing was permitted. The mayor also ordered police "to increase its vigilance at certain other dance halls, where the more jazzy steps are permitted." The following week, the Crystal Palace secured an injunction in court prohibiting molestation with the business.
- March 10 - After weeks of contentions negotiations, the Detroit United Railway agreed to sell its Detroit operations (including more than 300 miles of tracks and 1,157 cars) to the city for $19.85 million. A special election was set for April 17 to have the voters approve the transaction.
- March 11 - The 24-story, 300-foot-high First National Bank Building opened in Detroit. The Detroit Free Press called it a "lofty monument to faith in city."
- March 24 - The Ford company announced that it had adopted a 40-hour, five-day work week with pay remaining at $6 minimum per day ($5 for new workers). The company also stated that it would hire 3,000 new workers to meet demand in light of the reduced work week. Henry Ford explained the decision as follows: "Every man need more than one day a week for rest and recreation. The Ford company always has sought to promote ideal home life for its employees. We believe that in order to live properly every man should have more time to spend with his family, more time for self-improvement, more time for gardening, more time for building up the place we call home."
- March 25 - Four Boy Scouts, a scoutmaster, and three others drowned while trying out a new 14-foot steel boat in high winds at Magician's Lake near Dowagiac, Michigan.
- March 26 - The ferry, Omar D. Conger, sank in the Black River at Port Huron after an explosion. Four persons were killed and several persons maimed or injured.
- March 29 - A report from the Federal Reserve Board showed that Detroit's economic output was growing at a faster rate than any other city. The report showed the output of passenger cars up 32.1% from 81,474 in January to 107,626 in February. Output of trucks was up 40.9% from 8,832 to 12,444.

=== April ===
- April 1 - The Michigan Hall of Fame was opened at the Detroit Public Library. The first 10 persons inducted were James V. Campbell, Zachariah Chandler, Thomas M. Cooley, David Farrand, Douglass Houghton, James Frederick Joy, Henry Ledyard, William Frederick Poole, James McMillan, and Nancy Martin.
- April 3 - Peter Jezewski, a druggist and leader in the Polish community, was elected as the first mayor of the newly-formed city of Hamtramck, Michigan. Due to concerns about potential improprieties, the election was overseen by 20 state troopers and 75 sheriff deputies. Hamtramck had grown from a population of 3,559 persons in the 1910 Census to 48,615 persons in the 1920 Census. Two months later, Jezewski was sued for allegedly having an affair with Mrs. Joseph Wojcik while her husband was at work.
- April 5 - A report from the United States Employment Service showed that Detroit led all American cities in adding 11,439 jobs in the month of March.
- April 8 - Edward Fox, chief of detectives at the Detroit Police Department, was shot in the chest in the presence of his wife and child as four gunmen held up a Detroit meat market. The four alleged assailants were named two weeks later.

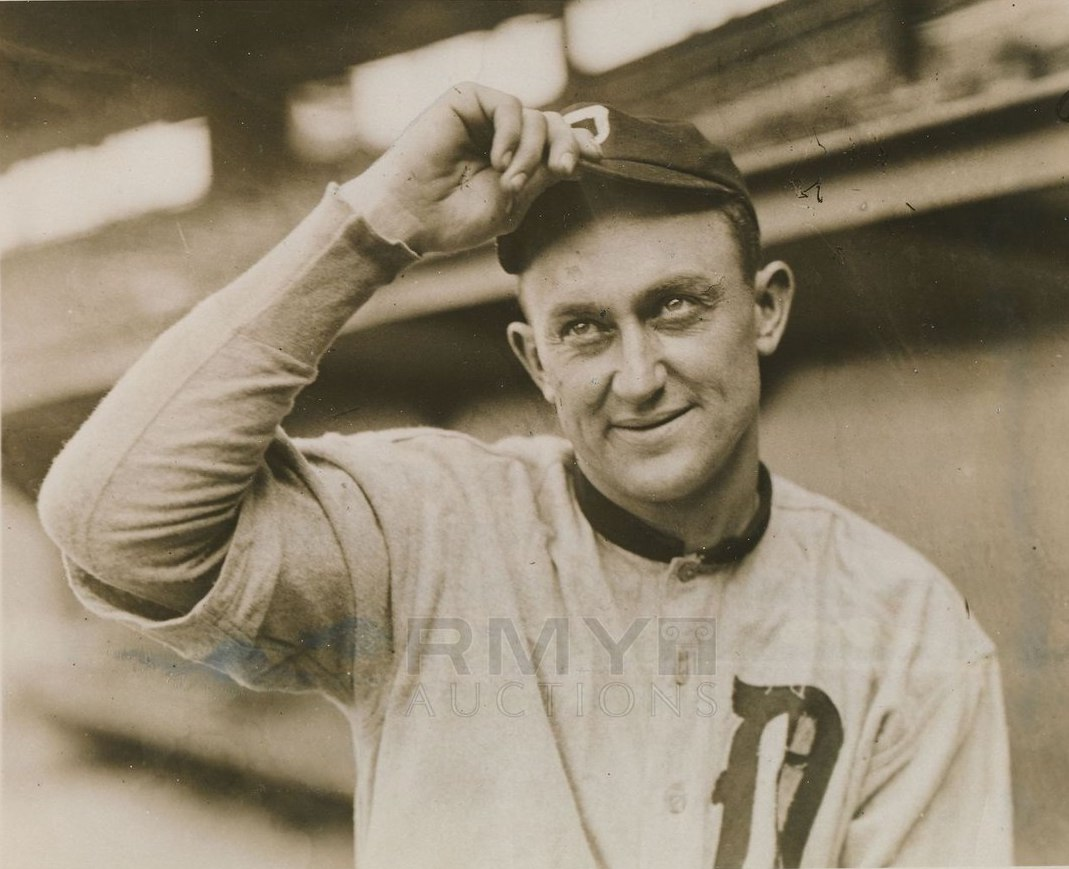
Ty Cobb led the 1922 Tigers with a .401 batting average.

- April 10 - The town of Tower in northern Michigan experienced major damage and one death due to flooding of the Lost River. Flood waters also swept through Cheboygan in the following days.
- April 12 - The Detroit Tigers lost on opening day to the Cleveland Indians by a score of 7–4 at Cleveland.
- April 13 - Seven convicts escaped from the Detroit House of Correction by leaping from a third-floor window.
- April 17 - Voters in Detroit overwhelmingly approved the city's purchase of the Detroit United Railway by a margin of 55,658 to 12,198.
- April 19 - Patrick T. Roche, described at the country's star rum sleuth, opened a permanent office with 20 special agents in Detroit to invest to investigate charges by Judge Tuttle of corruption in the enforcement of Prohibition laws.
- April 21 - The Employers Association announced that unemployment had ended in Detroit and that plants were unable to fill vacancies for skilled workers. According to the report, Detroit had 40,000 unemployed persons in October 1921, and 45,000 jobs had been added since that time.
- April 23 - A report from the National Bank of Commerce focused on the migration of industry from the Eastern Seaboard to the Midwest. It was reported that Michigan's manufacturing output had grown tenfold from $320 million in 1900 to $3.5 billion.

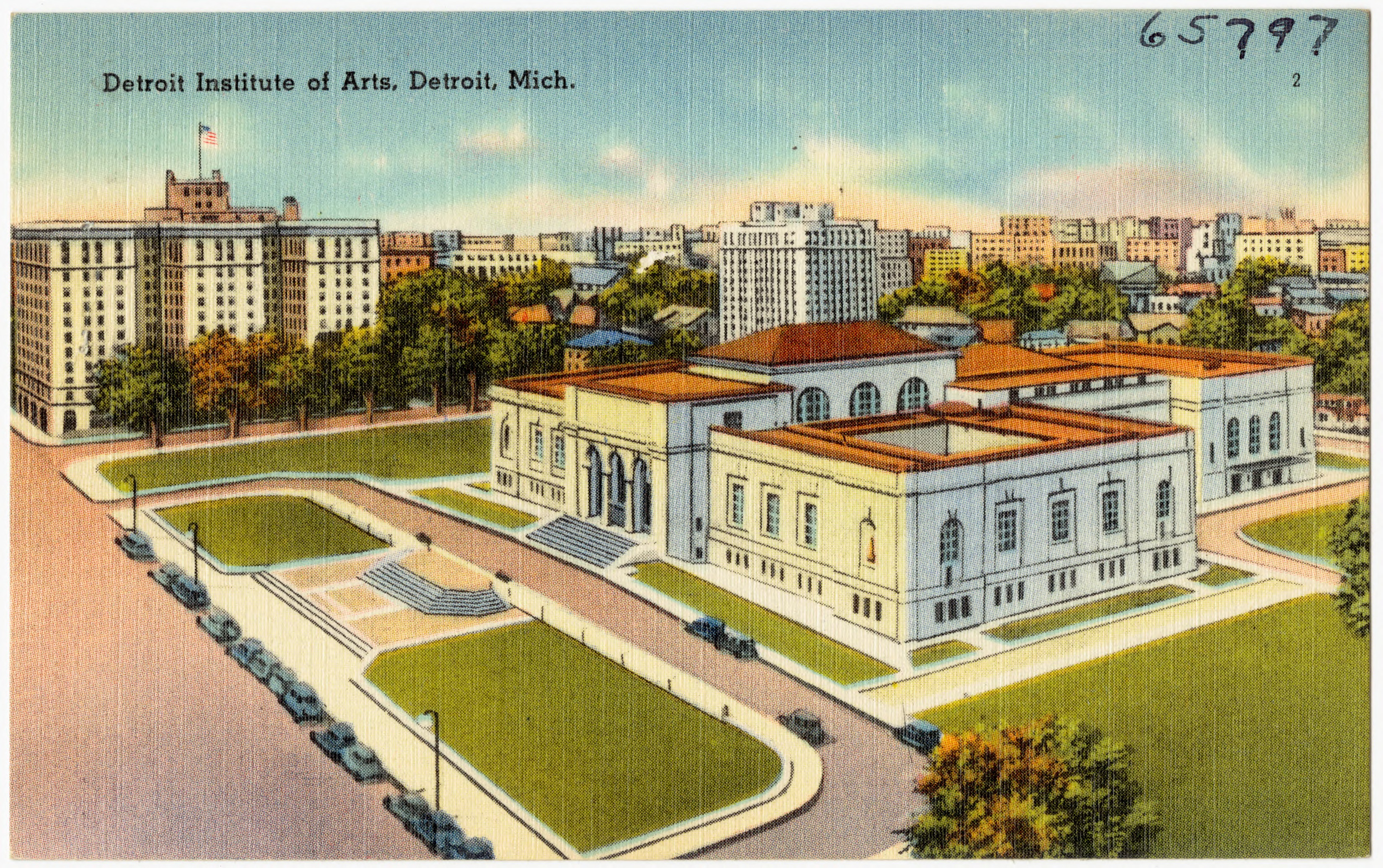
Work on the Detroit Institute of Arts began in 1922.

- April 23 - Five inmates escaped from the state prison in Ionia.
- April 28 - Packard announced it would hire 1,000 new workers, and Ford announced it would hire 9,000 more. Ford stated it was hiring 100 new men per day.
- April 28 - Plans and drawings for the new Detroit Institute of Arts building were unveiled. The building, to be built of white marble with a wide balustrade, was projected to take two years to build at a cost of $2.5 million.
- April 30 - A shootout took place between a security guard and police officers at the R.M. Schorenstein lumber company after the guard mistook the officers for burglars. The security guard was killed in the exchange of gunfire, and two police officers were wounded.

=== May ===
- May 1 - The federal reserve reported that production and shipment of automobiles increased by 55% in one month – from 98,487 passenger vehicles in February to 152,512 in April.
- May 4 - Radio came to the state as the Detroit Free Press began operation of a radio station known as WCX. The newspaper announced the endeavor as a gift to the people of Michigan. Governor Groesbeck attended the first broadcast. The first broadcast, heard as far as Chicago, included Mendelsohn music played on a Duoart reproducing piano and an aria and popular songs performed live by the noted Polish-American opera singer Thaddeus Wronski. WCX became WJR after being sold by the Free Press in 1925.
- May 5 - The U.S. Employment Bureau reported that automobile plants added 20,556 new workers in April, a 10% increase in the workforce in one month. Detroit led all cities with 16,428 new jobs added in April.
- May 7 - Eddie Stinson piloted a Junker airplane, carrying seven passengers, from Ashburn Field in Chicago and arrived at Morrow Field in Detroit two-and-a-half hours later. The passengers were able to have breakfast in Chicago and lunch in Detroit.
- May 12 - American League president Ban Johnson announced that, as part of the investigation of the Black Sox Scandal, evidence had been presented that $100 was paid to each of four players on the Detroit Tigers (Hooks Daus, Willie Mitchell, Bill James, and Oscar Stanage) to induce them to use extra efforts to defeat rivals of the White Sox in the closing days of the 1919 pennant race.
- May 18 - The 6,000,000th Ford automobile was produced at Ford's plant in Highland Park, Michigan.

=== June ===
- June 1 - A gun battle between a gang of four bank robbers and a posse of 500 farmers and police officers, using a machine gun, left two of robbers dead in a swamp near Hadley, Michigan. The gang had earlier in the day robbed $6,500 from the Metamora State Savings Bank. Two days later, a posse of 600 pursued a gang that robbed $8,000 from a bank in Farwell, Michigan.
- June 23 - After being extradited back to Michigan in April, Charles C. Jonesi, manager of the L.J. Sinkula brokerage company, was tried (in front of Judge Willie Heston) and convicted of conspiracy to defraud in selling $1 million in worthless stock to foreign-born residents of Detroit, mostly Poles. The story received front-page coverage for much of the spring and summer. Jonesi was sentenced on June 28 to two years in jail. His conviction was later affirmed by the Michigan Supreme Court in 1923.

=== September ===
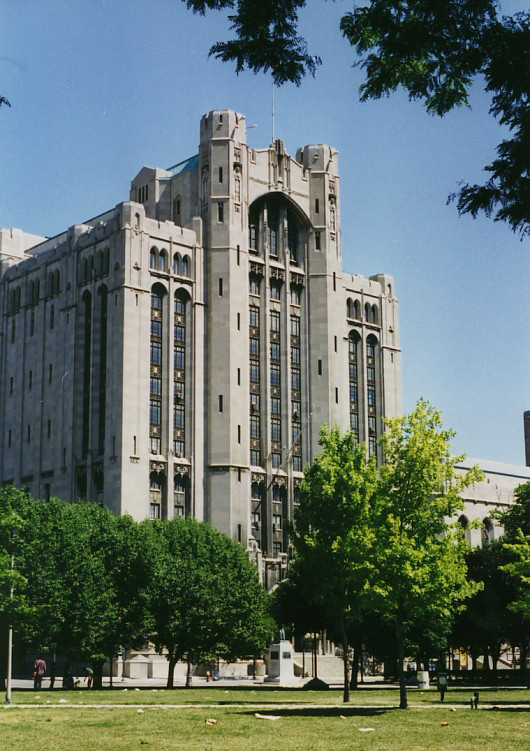
Detroit Masonic Temple

- September 5 - Colonel Jesse G. Vincent piloted his Packard Chris-Craft boat to a victory in the Gold Cup, the national powerboat championship. The race was run on the Detroit River before a crowd of 100,000 persons. Vincent's victory broke a five-year winning streak by Gar Wood who won the Gold Cup each year from 1917 to 1921.
- September 18 - Navy Secretary Edwin Denby laid the cornerstone for the $5-million Detroit Masonic Temple, before a crowd of 200,000 persons.

=== October ===
- October 1 - The Detroit Tigers concluded their season with a loss to Cleveland. Several Tiger ranked among the American League's leaders. Ty Cobb's .401 batting average, 211 hits, and 16 triples all ranked second behind George Sisler. Lu Blue's 131 runs also ranked second behind Sisler. And Bobby Veach's 126 RBIs also ranked second in the league.
- October 14 - The 1922 Michigan vs. Vanderbilt football game ended in a scoreless tie. The Wolverines won every other game during their 1922 season.

=== November ===
- November 4 - Sen. Charles E. Townsend, in close competition for re-election, defended his support for seating the beleaguered Sen. Truman Newberry. At a Detroit rally, Townsend insisted that Newberry was "honestly elected" and noted that the seating of Newberry preserved Republican control of the Senate and made it possible to defeat the League of Nations.

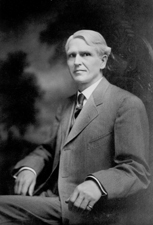
Woodbridge N. Ferris

- November 4 - Michigan defeated Michigan Agricultural by a 63–0 score in the annual rivalry game. Lloyd Northard wrote in the Detroit Free Press that "not in the past 10 years has an Aggie team been so utterly out-classed in every department of the game." Fully embracing the passing game, Michigan threw 33 passes with 17 completions. Northard wrote that the game at times "more resembled basketball than football" and called it "the greatest exhibition of aerial play ever witnessed on Ferry Field", setting records for both passes thrown and completed.
- November 7 -

- In the 1922 Michigan gubernatorial election, the incumbent Republican Alex J. Groesbeck received 61.5% of the votes, easily defeating Democratic candidate Alva M. Cummins who received 37.4% of the votes.
- In the election for a U.S. Senate seat from Michigan, Democrat former Governor Woodbridge N. Ferris defeated incumbent Sen. Charles E. Townsend. Ferris won by a narrow margin of 294,932 votes (50.59%) to 281,843 votes (48.35%). Ferris was the first Democratic Senator elected from Michigan in 70 years.
- In the election for Michigan's 13 seats in the U.S. House of Representatives, Republicans retained control of 12 seats. In the first district, following the retirement of Republican George P. Codd, Democrat Robert H. Clancy won the seat with 55.4% of the votes.

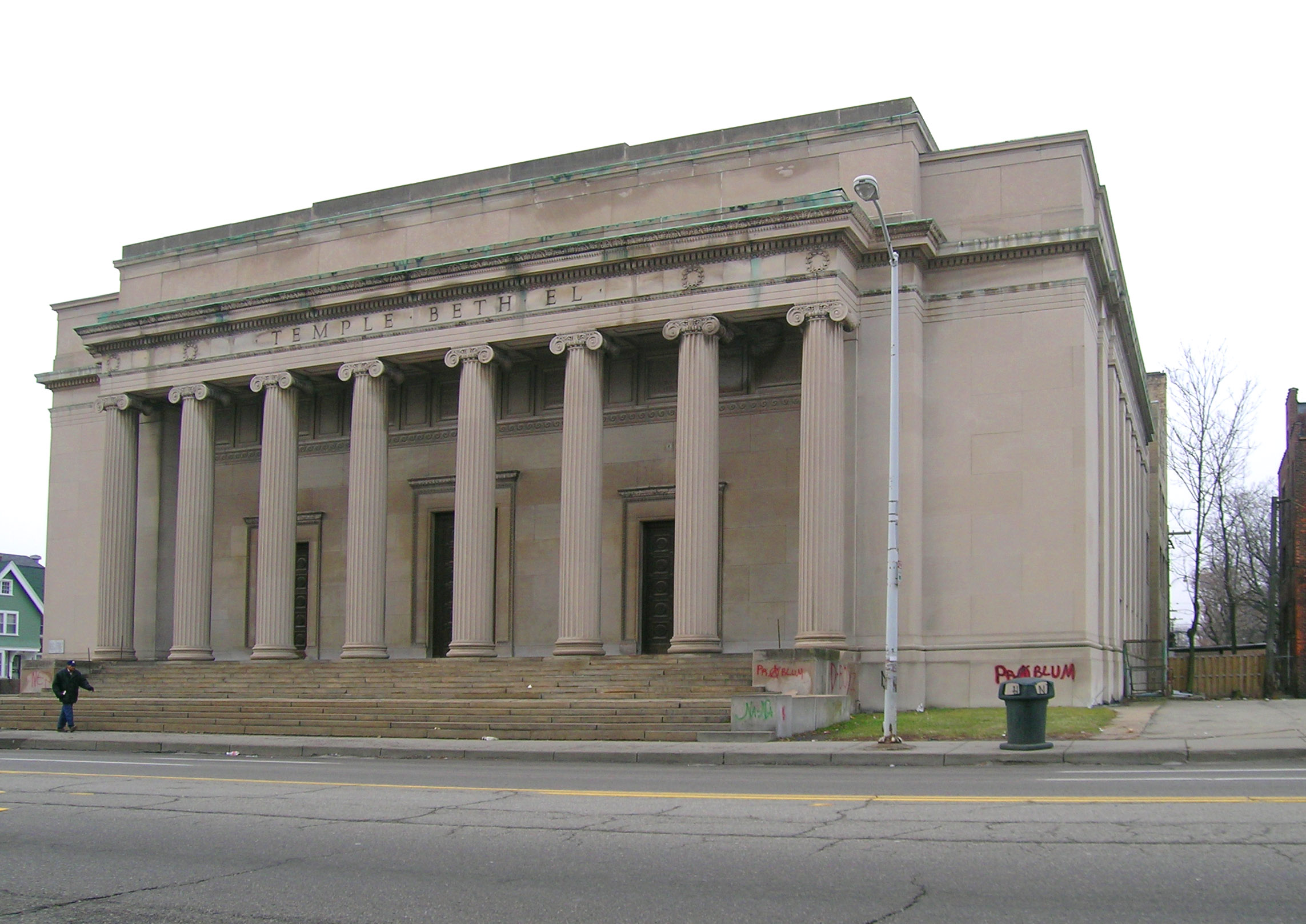
Temple Beth El

- November 7 - Baseball great Sam Thompson who led the 1887 Detroit Wolverines to the city's first championship in the 1887 World Series died, age 62, at his home at 6468 Trumbell Avenue in Detroit. In retirement, he lived in Detroit, invested in real estate, and served as a deputy marshall at Detroit's federal building.
- November 10-12 - Temple Beth El at 8801 Woodward Avenue, designed by Albert Kahn, was dedicated in Detroit. Several days after the dedication, Rabbi Leo M. Franklin, pastor at the old temple since 1898, was elected as "rabbi for life" of the new temple.
- November 19 - U.S. Senator Truman Newberry resigned from the Senate, complaining about partisan persecution. The resignation, presented to Gov. Groesbeck, was effective immediately. Newberry had been criticized for spending $190,000 in his 1918 campaign to defeat Henry Ford in the election to the Senate. Woodbridge N. Ferris, recently elected to the Senate, had recently announced that his first official act would be a demand to unseat Newberry.
- November 29 -

* Gov. Groesbeck appointed Detroit Mayor James Couzens to the U.S. Senate, filling the vacancy resulting from the resignation of Truman Newberry.
- John C. Lodge, president of Detroit's common council, became the acting Mayor of Detroit.

=== December ===
- December 7 - James Couzens sworn in as a U.S. Senator in Washington, D.C.
- December 16 - The last span of Detroit's Belle Isle Bridge was bolted into place.
- December 14 - The tugboat Reliance, owned by the Superior Paper Company, was stranded after crashing into rocks in a storm off Lizzard Island in Lake Superior, resulting in the loss of four lives. Twenty-three crew members survived in lifeboats.
- December 21 - Henry Ford announced that, with demand exceeding the capacity of the Highland Park plant, the company would build a new $6-million manufacturing and assembly plant near Chicago.

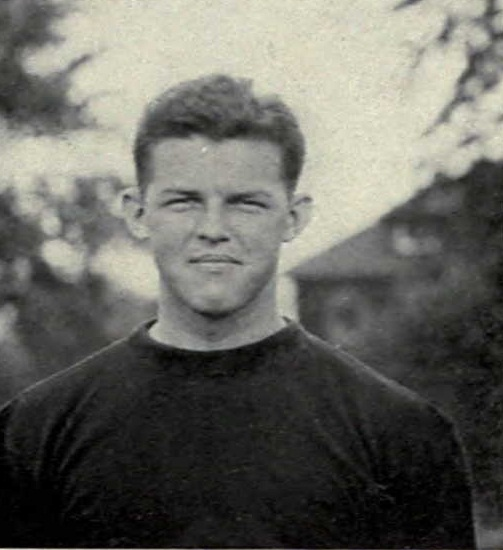
Bernard Kirk

- December 27 - The funeral of Michigan football star Bernard Kirk, held in Ypsilanti after the 22-year old athlete died from injuries sustained in an automobile accident, was covered by newspapers across the United States. The church where the requiem mass was held "could not accommodate a tenth of those attending the services." Kirk's honorary pallbearers included University of Michigan President Marion Leroy Burton, Michigan Governor Alex Groesbeck, Fielding H. Yost, and two U.S. Congressmen. His casket was carried to the grave by eight of his Michigan teammates, including Harry Kipke, Paul Goebel, Irwin Uteritz, and Franklin Cappon. One account described the emotional response of Kirk's teammates at the funeral: "As the casket bearing the body of the former University of Michigan football star was slowly lowered into his last resting place, husky athletes who battled with him on the football fields for the glory and honor of Michigan sobbed unashamed."
- December 28 - Federal Prohibition officers raided 10 sites in Wyandotte, Michigan. Director James P. Davis described the raids as the first step in a well-defined plan to ensure that Detroiters celebrated New Year's Eve without alcohol. The following day, Davis' agents launched raids on "blind pigs and resorts" in Detroit.

== Births ==
- January 28 - Anna Gordy Gaye, record executive, songwriter, sister of Berry Gordy, wife of Marvin Gaye, in Georgia
- January 30 - Dick Martin, comedian and co-host of 'Rowan & Martin's Laugh-In, in Battle Creek, Michigan
- March 26 - William Milliken, Governor of Michigan (1969-1983), in Traverse City, Michigan
- March 31 - James M. Nederlander, theatre owner and producer, in Detroit
- April 28 - William Broomfield, US Congress (1957-93), in Royal Oak
- June 30 - Zolton Ferency, political activist and law professor, in Detroit
- July 4 - Damon Keith, US District Court Judge (1967-77), Court of Appeals (1977-95), in Detroit
- July 4 - R. James Harvey, Congress (1961-74), US District Judge (1973-2019), in Iron Mountain, MI
- August 23 - George Kell, third baseman for Detroit Tigers (1946–1952), Hall of Fame inductee, and TV play-by-play announcer(1959–1996), in Swifton, Arkansas
- September 3 - Burt Kennedy, film and TV director, writer, producer, specializing in Westerns, in Muskegon
- September 16 - Robert J. McIntosh, US Congress (1957-59), in Port Huron
- November 12 - Kim Hunter, actress, in Detroit
- November 26 - Richard Vander Veen, US Congress (1974-77), in Grand Rapids
- December 2 - Charles Diggs, Congressman, in Detroit
- December 5 - Bill Davidson, businessman and owner of Detroit Pistons, in Detroit

=== Gallery of 1922 births ===
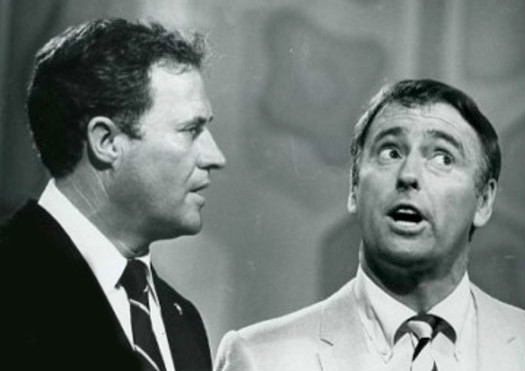
Dick Martin

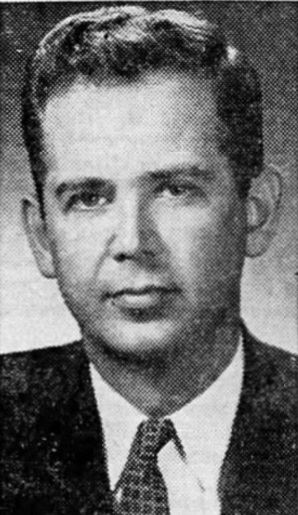
William Milliken

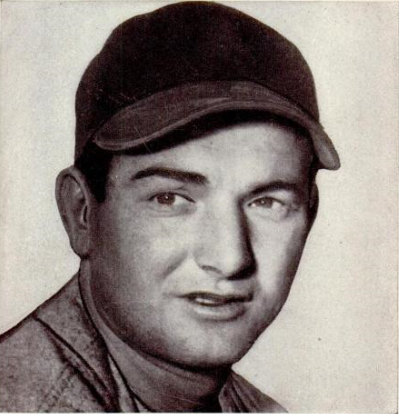
George Kell

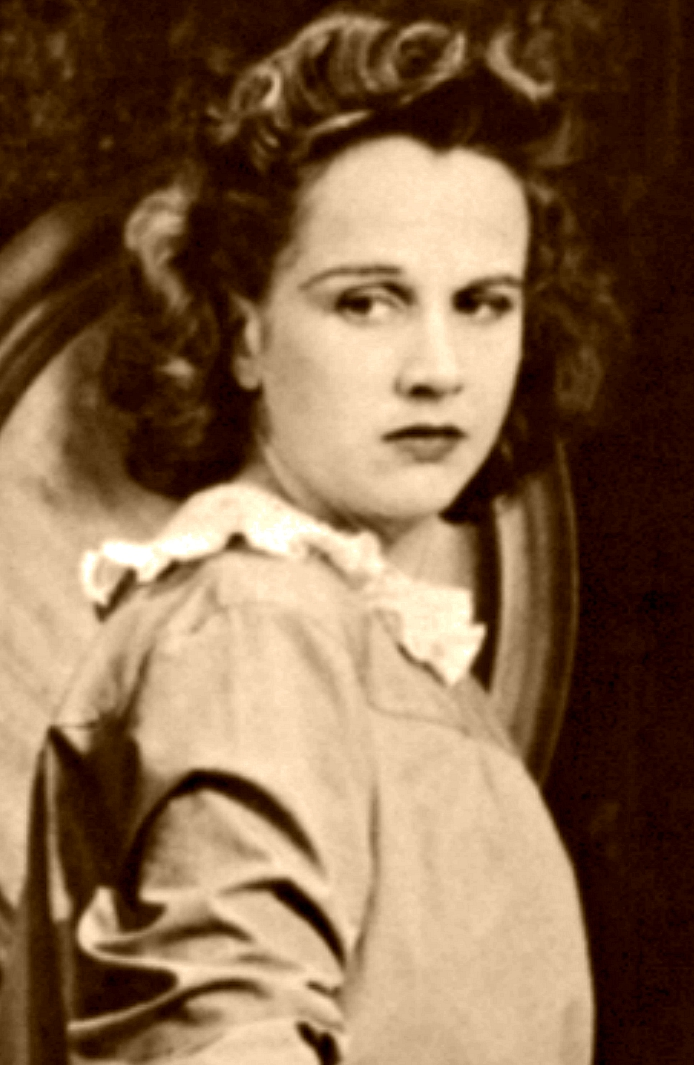
Kim Hunter

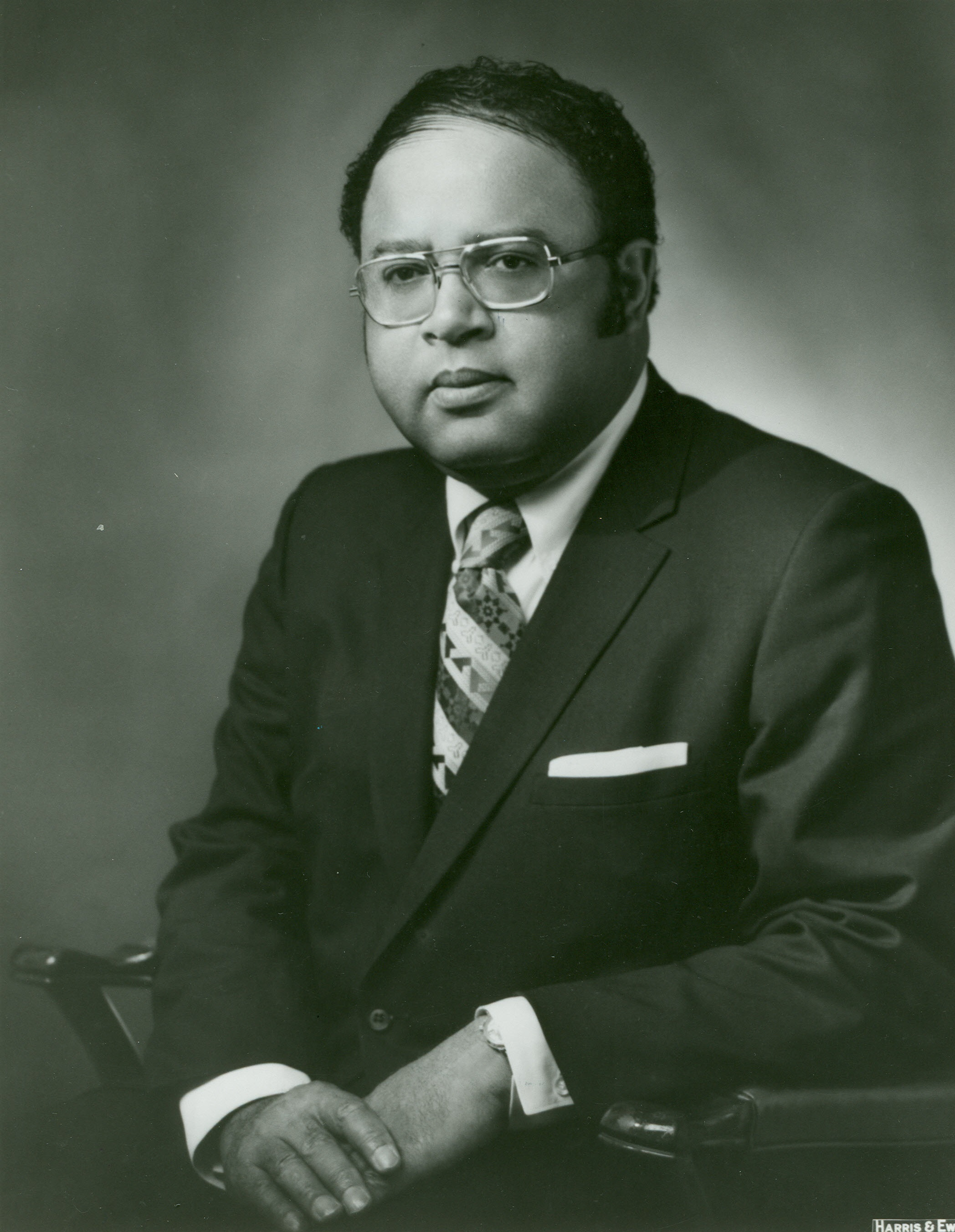
Charles Diggs

== Deaths ==
- April 19 - W. Irving Latimer, Michigan Auditor General (1879–1881), at age 85 in Portland, Oregon
- July 30 - Oliver L. Spaulding, U.S. Congressman from Michigan (1881–1883), at age 88 in Washington, D.C.
- August 24 - William Wilson Talcott, quarterback for the undefeated 1898 Michigan football team, at age 43 by suicide at Chicago's Navy Pier after his wife left him for a "love cult"
- November 7 - Sam Thompson, MLB player for Detroit Wolverines (1885–1888), Hall of Fame inductee, at age 62 in Detroit
- December 23 - Bernard Kirk, end for U-M football team, at age 22 from injuries sustained in a car crash

=== Gallery of 1922 deaths ===
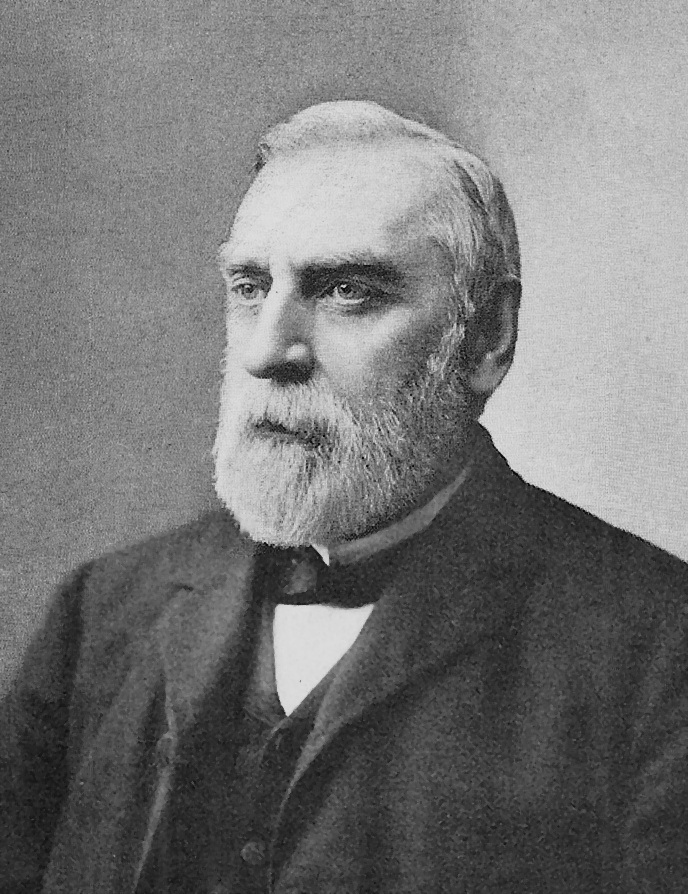
Oliver L. Spaulding

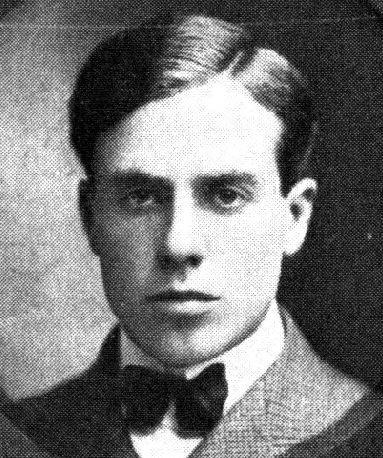
William Wilson Talcott

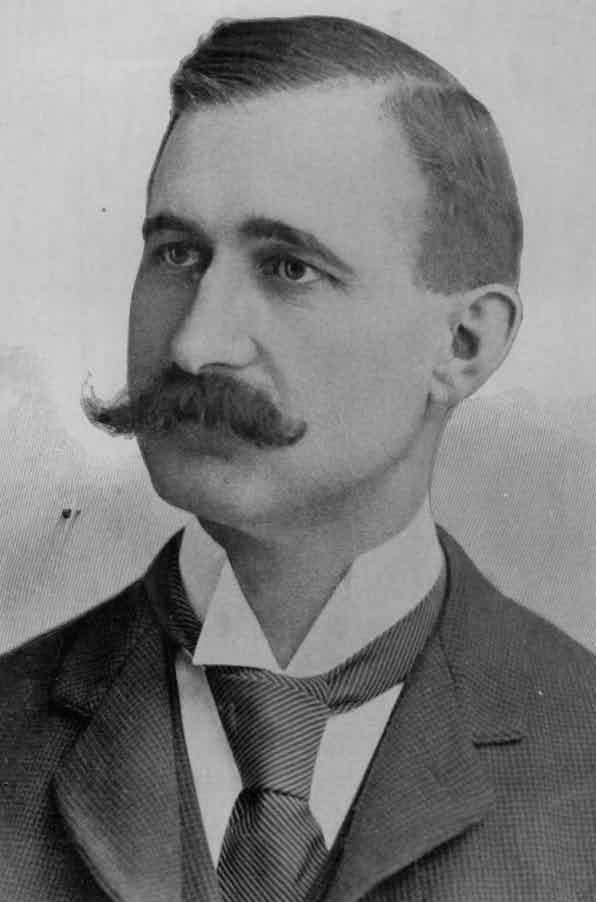
Sam Thompson
