= William McKeighan =

William McKeighan may refer to:

- William A. McKeighan (1842–1895), Nebraska Populist politician
- William H. McKeighan (1886–1957), Michigan politician
