= George E. Boysen =

American politician (1890–1967)

George Everett Boysen

67th / 5th City Commission Mayor of the City of Flint, Michigan
- In office 1935–1936
- Preceded by: Howard J. Clifford
- Succeeded by: Harold E. Bradshaw

City Commissioner of the City of Flint, Michigan

Personal details
- Born: March 15, 1890 Port Clinton, Ohio, U.S.
- Died: March 22, 1967 (aged 77) Genesee County, Michigan, U.S.
- Party: Republican
- Spouse: Kathryn Wadsworth
- Relations: Charles and Caroline Boysen, parents

George Everett Boysen (March 15, 1890 – March 22, 1967) was a Michigan politician. He was employed for 24 years with the Buick Motor Company. He was a member of the Freemasons and Benevolent and Protective Order of Elks.

== Early life ==
Boysen was born to Charles and Caroline Boysen on March 15, 1890, in Port Clinton, Ottawa County, Ohio. On June 18, 1913, he married Kathryn Wadsworth.

== Political life ==
In 1932 Boysen ran in the Republican primary for U.S. Representative from Michigan 6th District and again in 1936. The Flint City Commission select him as mayor in 1935 for a single year. In 1938 he was a candidate for Michigan state senate 13th District.

Political offices
Preceded by Howard J. Clifford	Mayor of Flint; 1935–1936	Succeeded by Harold E. Bradshaw
