= Charles Stewart Mott =

American businessman and politician (1875–1973)

C.S. Mott
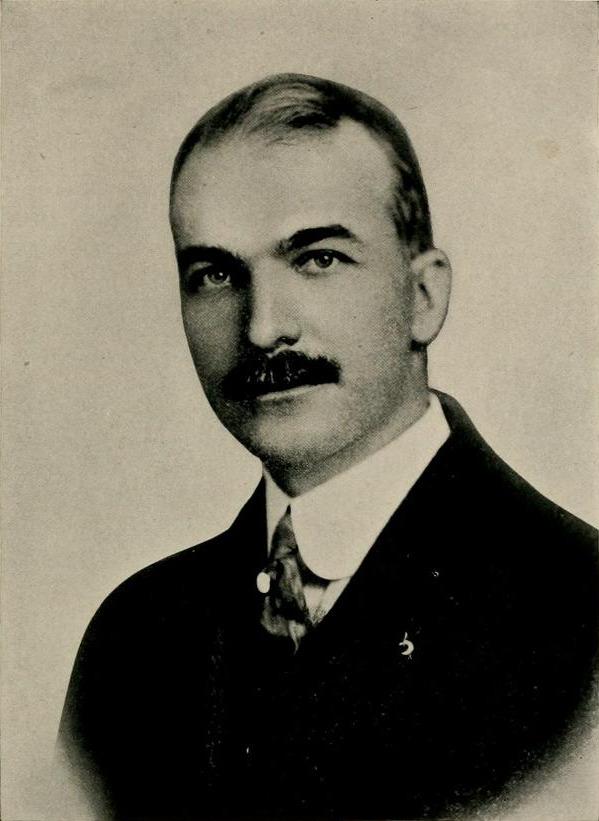

50th and 55th Mayor of the City of Flint, Michigan
- In office 1918–1919
- Preceded by: George C. Kellar
- Succeeded by: George C. Kellar
- In office 1912–1914
- Preceded by: John A. C. Menton
- Succeeded by: John R. MacDonald

Personal details
- Born: Charles Stewart Mott; June 2, 1875 Newark, New Jersey, U.S.
- Died: February 18, 1973 (aged 97) Flint, Michigan, U.S.
- Party: Republican
- Spouse(s): Ethel Culbert Harding (m. 1900-d. 1924); Mitlies Rathburn (m. 1927-d. 1928); Fernande Jacqueline “Dee” Van Balkom (m. 1929-d. 1929); Ruth Rawlings (m. 1934-)
- Children: Aimee Mott; Elsa Beatrice Mott; Charles Stewart Harding Mott; Susan Elizabeth Rawlings Mott; Stewart Rawlings; Maryanne Rawlings Mott
- Education: Stevens Institute of Technology
- Religion: Episcopalian
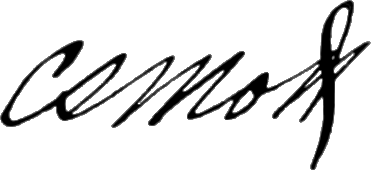
- Signature
- Website: History and Founder - CS Mott Foundation

Military service
- Allegiance: United States
- Branch/service: Navy
- War: Spanish–American War

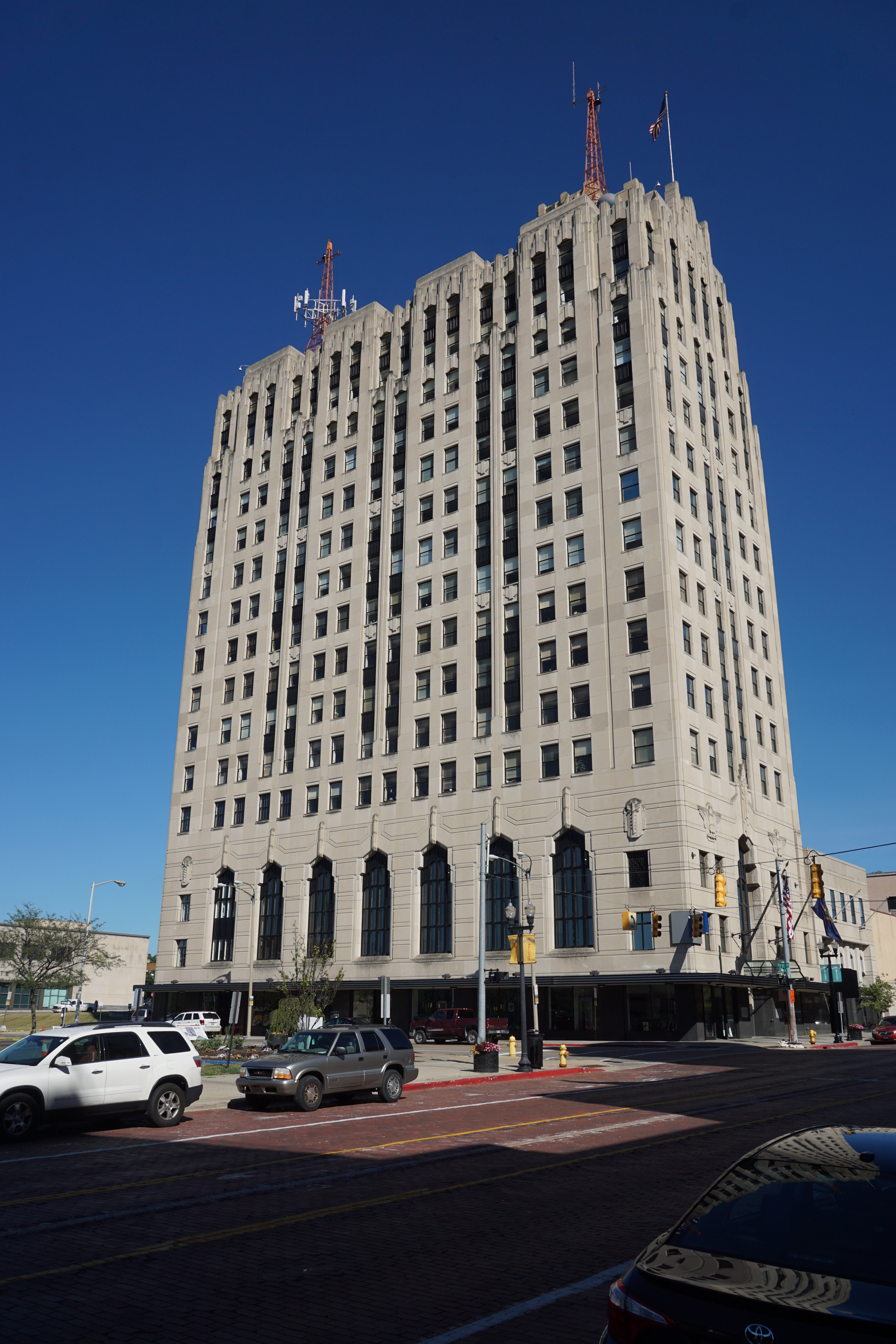
The Charles Stewart Mott Foundation Building in Flint, MI

Charles Stewart Mott (June 2, 1875 – February 18, 1973) was an American industrialist and businessman, philanthropist, a co-owner of General Motors, and the 50th and 55th mayor of Flint, Michigan.

Mott is the figure most responsible for founding the Flint Senior College (now University of Michigan–Flint). Mott initiated the idea of creating the college and pledged $1 million toward the project.

== Career ==
Charles Stewart Mott was born on June 2, 1875, in Newark, New Jersey, to John Coon Mott and Isabella Turnbull Stewart. He graduated from Stevens Institute of Technology in 1897 with a degree in mechanical engineering. In 1907 Mott moved his wheel and axle manufacturing firm, Weston Mott, from Utica, New York to Flint, Michigan after an invitation by William C. Durant, then the President of the Buick Motor Company, which was soon to become the General Motors Corporation. Weston-Mott later merged with GM. For many decades Mott would remain the single largest individual shareholder in the firm, and accumulate wealth in excess of $800 million. His closest proteges at the helm of GM were Alfred P. Sloan, Jr. and Charles Kettering. In 1921, Mott became chief of the GM Advisory Staff at the Detroit headquarters. He served on the GM Board of Directors for 60 years, from 1913 until his death in 1973. He was Mayor of the City of Flint in 1912–1913 and was defeated for re-election in 1914, but was again elected in 1918. In 1920, he ran in the Republican primary for governor of Michigan. In 1924 and 1940, he was a Michigan delegate to the Republican National Convention. He was selected as a Republican presidential elector candidate for Michigan in 1964. Mott purchased U.S. Sugar in 1931.

== Philanthropy ==
In 1926, Mott established the Charles Stewart Mott Foundation.

In 1965, Mott donated $6.5 million to the University of Michigan to help the university build its first children's hospital. Due to his donation, the equivalent of $50 million in 2021, the university named the children's hospital in honor of him. The 200 bed hospital would go on to serve about 3,500 children in its first year of operation.

In 1972, Mott received the Golden Plate Award of the American Academy of Achievement.

== Personal life ==
C.S. Mott married Ethel Culbert Harding in 1900 and they had three children: Aimee, Elsa and C.S. Harding. Ethel Mott died in 1924 at age 43 after falling from the window of her second-story bedroom. In 1927, Mott married his second wife Mitlies Rathburn (1892-1928). She died on February 26, 1928. In March 1929, Mott married his third wife, Dee Furey (1899-1986), and filed for divorce in October of the same year. In 1934 Mott married his fourth wife, Ruth Rawlings, with whom he also had three children: Susan Elizabeth, Stewart Rawlings, and Maryanne.

== Applewood ==
C.S. Mott's Flint, Michigan estate, Applewood, was built in 1916 as a self-sustaining farm for the Mott family. The main residence and grounds encompass approximately 34 acres (140,000 m^{2}), 18 extensively landscaped. They include perennial, rose, cut flower and demonstration gardens, and an orchard with 29 varieties of heritage apples. The Ruth Mott Foundation currently owns and maintains Applewood, which is seasonally open to the public.

== Death ==
Mott entered St. Joseph Hospital in Flint on January 28, 1973, with a cold, and then developed a flu which worsened from there. Mott died on February 18, 1973, in hospital. In response to his death, Flint City Mayor Francis E. Limmer declared a seven-day mourning period in the city. He was laid in state at St. Paul's Episcopal Church before being interred at in the Mott family mausoleum in Glenwood Cemetery.

Political offices
Preceded by John A. C. Menton	Mayor of Flint; 1912–1914	Succeeded by John R. MacDonald
Preceded by George C. Kellar	Mayor of Flint; 1918–1919	Succeeded by George C. Kellar
