= Earl F. Johnson =

American politician

53rd Mayor of the City of Flint, Michigan
- In office 1916–1917
- Preceded by: William H. McKeighan
- Succeeded by: George C. Kellar

Personal details
- Born: March 30, 1868 Thetford Township, Michigan
- Died: April 8, 1947 (aged 79) Genesee County, Michigan
- Spouse: 1

Earl F. Johnson (March 30, 1868 – April 8, 1947) was a Michigan politician.

== Political life ==
In 1900, Johnson was a Michigan Alternate delegate to the Republican National Convention. He was elected as the mayor of City of Flint in 1916 for a single one-year term.

Political offices
Preceded by William H. McKeighan	Mayor of Flint; 1916–1917	Succeeded by George C. Kellar
