= Judson L. Transue =

American politician

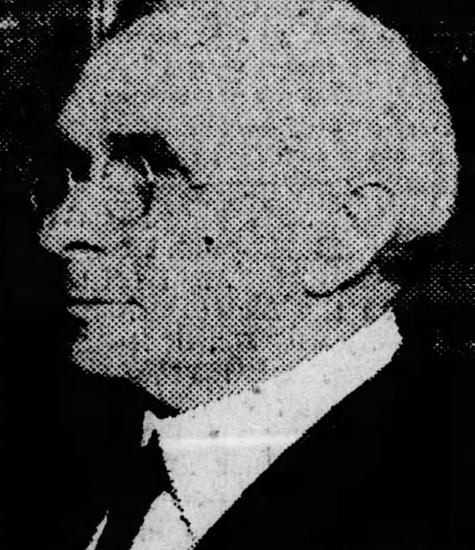

60th Mayor of the City of Flint, Michigan
- In office 1924–1927
- Preceded by: David R. Cuthbertson
- Succeeded by: William H. McKeighan

Personal details
- Born: February 15, 1897 Williamson, New York
- Died: December 17, 1980 (aged 83) Genesee County, Michigan

Judson Lincoln Transue (February 15, 1897 – December 17, 1980) was a Michigan politician.

== Political life ==
He was elected as the Mayor of City of Flint in 1924 for three 1 year terms. Transue was supported by the Ku Klux Klan, who mounted A recall effort of his predecessor, Cuthbertson, for his appointment of a Catholic Police Chief, James P. Cole. Despite the KKK's support, he kept Cole on as police chief.

Political offices
Preceded by David R. Cuthbertson	Mayor of Flint; 1924–1927	Succeeded by William H. McKeighan
