= Howard J. Clifford =

American politician (1870–1940)

66th / 4th City Commission Mayor of the City of Flint, Michigan
- In office 1934–1935
- Preceded by: Ray A. Brownell
- Succeeded by: George E. Boysen

City Commissioner of the City of Flint, Michigan

Personal details
- Born: 1870
- Died: 1940 (aged 69–70)

Howard J. Clifford (1870–1940) was a Michigan politician.

== Political life ==
The Flint City Commission select him as mayor in 1934 for a single year.

Political offices
Preceded by Ray A. Brownell	Mayor of Flint; 1934–1935	Succeeded by George E. Boysen
