= Ray A. Brownell =

American politician (1876–1954)

62nd Mayor of the City of Flint, Michigan
- In office 1929–1930
- Preceded by: William H. McKeighan
- Succeeded by: 1st City Commission Mayor; Harvey J. Mallery

65th / 3rd City Commission Mayor of the City of Flint, Michigan
- In office 1933–1934
- Preceded by: William H. McKeighan
- Succeeded by: Howard J. Clifford

City Commissioner of the City of Flint, Michigan
- Constituency

Personal details
- Born: June 1876
- Died: August 9, 1954 (aged 78) Genesee County, Michigan

Ray A. Brownell (June 1876 – August 9, 1954) was a Michigan politician.

== Political life ==
Brownell was elected as the Mayor of City of Flint in 1929 for a single 1-year term by the City Commission. He was last of the directly elected Flint Mayors until 1975.

Political offices
Preceded by William H. McKeighan	Mayor of Flint; 1929–1930	Succeeded by 1st City Commission Mayor; Harvey J. Mallery
Preceded by William H. McKeighan	Mayor of Flint; 1933–1934	Succeeded by Howard J. Clifford
