= Harvey J. Mallery =

American politician

63rd / 1st City Commission Mayor of the City of Flint, Michigan
- In office 1930–1931
- Preceded by: Ray A. Brownell
- Succeeded by: William H. McKeighan

City Commissioner of the City of Flint, Michigan

Harvey J. Mallery was a Michigan politician.

== Political life ==
The Flint City Commission select him as mayor in 1930 for a single year as the first City Commission Mayor under the 1929 charter.

Political offices
Preceded by Ray A. Brownell; Directly Elected Mayor	Mayor of Flint; 1st City Commission Mayor; 1930–1931	Succeeded by William H. McKeighan
