= John R. MacDonald =

American politician (1857–1946)

51st Mayor of the City of Flint, Michigan
- In office 1914–1915
- Preceded by: Charles Stewart Mott
- Succeeded by: William H. McKeighan

Personal details
- Born: March 30, 1857 Moretown, Washington County, Vermont
- Died: January 1946 (aged 88)
- Party: Progressive

John R. MacDonald (1857–1946) was a Michigan politician. He was a member of Knights of the Loyal Guard, Freemasons, Shriners and Knights of Pythias.

== Early life ==
On March 30, 1857, MacDonald was born in Moretown, Washington County, Vermont. In 1895, he was the first captain-general of Division No. 1 of The Knights of the Loyal Guard, a fraternal beneficiary society. In 1905 and 1906, he served as Worshipful Master of Genesee Lodge No. 174 of the Free and Accepted Masons of Michigan.

== Political life ==
He was elected as the Mayor of City of Flint in 1914 for a single 1-year term defeating his predecessor, Charles Stewart Mott.

== Post-political life ==
MacDonald died at Hurley Hospital from injuries from a fall at home in January 1946. He was cremated with his ashes interred at Avondale Cemetery, Flint, Michigan.

Political offices
Preceded by Charles Stewart Mott	Mayor of Flint; 1914–1915	Succeeded by William H. McKeighan
