= David R. Cuthbertson =

American politician

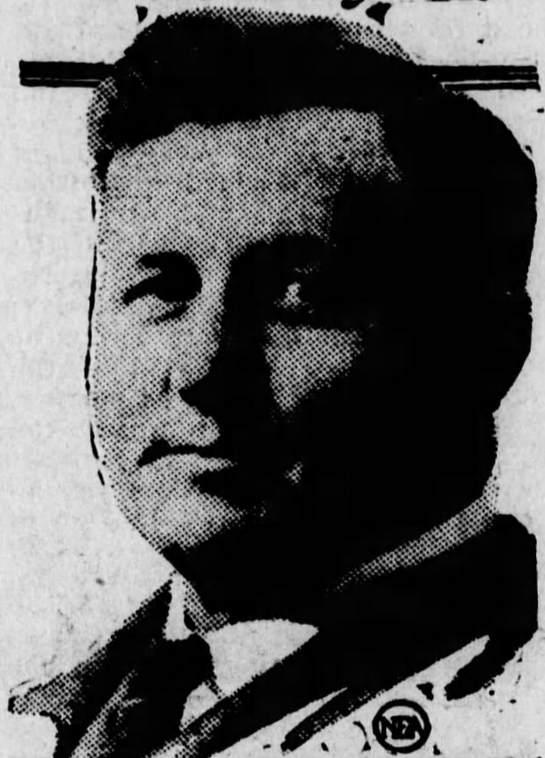

59th Mayor of the City of Flint, Michigan
- In office 1923–1924
- Preceded by: William H. McKeighan
- Succeeded by: Judson L. Transue

Personal details
- Born: May 5, 1868 Taymouth, Michigan, US
- Died: January 5, 1941 (aged 72) Flint, Michigan
- Party: Democratic
- Children: Willis Earle Cuthbertson

David Ross Cuthbertson (May 5, 1868 – January 5, 1941) was a Michigan politician.

== Political life ==
He was elected as the Mayor of City of Flint in 1923 for a single one-year term, defeating the incumbent mayor, William H. McKeighan.

=== Recall Election 1924 Results ===
A recall effort was mounted by people, including the Ku Klux Klan, who opposed Cuthbertson's appointment of a Catholic Police Chief, James P. Cole. The 1924 election was successful in removing Cuthbertson.

Yes	8,304	58%
No	5,977	42%
Total	14,281	100%

Cuthbertson indicated that he would run in the replacement election.

Political offices
Preceded by William H. McKeighan	Mayor of Flint; 1923–1924	Succeeded by Judson L. Transue
