= George C. Kellar =

American politician (1879–1954)

54th Mayor of the City of Flint, Michigan
- In office 1917–1918
- Preceded by: Earl F. Johnson
- Succeeded by: Charles Stewart Mott

56th Mayor of the City of Flint, Michigan
- In office 1919–1920
- Preceded by: Charles Stewart Mott
- Succeeded by: Edwin W. Atwood

President pro tem
- Constituency: Common Council, City of Flint

Alderman
- Constituency: Fourth Ward, City of Flint

Personal details
- Born: July 31, 1879 Tyler County, West Virginia
- Died: September 20, 1954 (aged 75) Genesee County, Michigan
- Party: Republican

George Currant Kellar (July 31, 1879 – September 20, 1954) was a Michigan politician.

== Political life ==
Kellar was an Alderman and President Pro Temp of the Flint City Common Council in 1916-1917. He was elected twice as the Mayor of City of Flint first in 1917 for a single 1-year term then again for another term in 1919. In 1934, he was a Genesee County 1st District Michigan state house of representatives candidate.

Political offices
Preceded by Earl F. Johnson	Mayor of Flint; 1917–1918	Succeeded by Charles Stewart Mott
Preceded by Charles Stewart Mott	Mayor of Flint; 1919–1920	Succeeded by Edwin W. Atwood
