= Edwin W. Atwood =

American politician

57th Mayor of the City of Flint, Michigan
- In office 1920–1922
- Preceded by: George C. Kellar
- Succeeded by: William H. McKeighan

Personal details
- Born: September 1875 Michigan, U.S.
- Died: January 31, 1958 (aged 82) Genesee County, Michigan
- Relations: William A. Atwood, father

Edwin W. Atwood (September 1875 – January 31, 1958) was a Michigan politician.

== Political life ==
He was elected as the Mayor of City of Flint in 1920 for a two 1 year terms. He was re-elected unopposed in 1921. In 1928, Atwood was a Michigan delegate to Republican National Convention.

Political offices
Preceded by George C. Kellar	Mayor of Flint; 1920–1922	Succeeded by William H. McKeighan
