= Thaddeus Wronski =

Opera singer (1887–1965)

Thaddeus Ziembinski Wronski (born Tadeusz; 13 September 1887 – 24 May 1965) was a Polish-American opera singer, theatrical manager, teacher, and innovator. He dedicated much of his life to innovative approaches to teaching singers.

Born in Piotrków Trybunalski, Poland, he studied in Warsaw, Milan, and Paris under Vincenzo Maria Pintorno, Maria Maddalena Fratini, André Caplet, the brothers Édouard and Jean de Reszke. He first went to the United States in 1911 and immigrated in 1913. As a baritone, he initially sang for the Boston Opera, but, he did not abandon his native land, Poland. He worked with Ignacy Jan Paderewiski to raise over $500,000 for Poland and recruited men for the Polish army during World War I. He became the head of the National Recording Studio launching his lifelong work to improve singing through the use of phonographic technology. In 1921, he returned from a trip to Poland and planned to open a studio in New York City. In that same year, he published The Singer And His Art.

He moved to Detroit initially as a teacher, but, he became the director of the Detroit Civic Opera from 1928 to 1938. His production of Aida in 1930 incorporated the use of African-American actors, a dramatic move for that era. In 1938, the Detroit company began to struggle financially and he resigned moving to Los Angeles in 1939. In California, he pursued his hope to improve American singing through recording technology. He prepared a set of recordings of commonly sung pieces without the voice]. This "music minus one" approach gives singers an opportunity to develop their skills without the need for a live accompanist or group. Eventually moving to San Diego, he died there in 1965.
