= William H. McKeighan =

American politician (1886–1957)

William Henry McKeighan
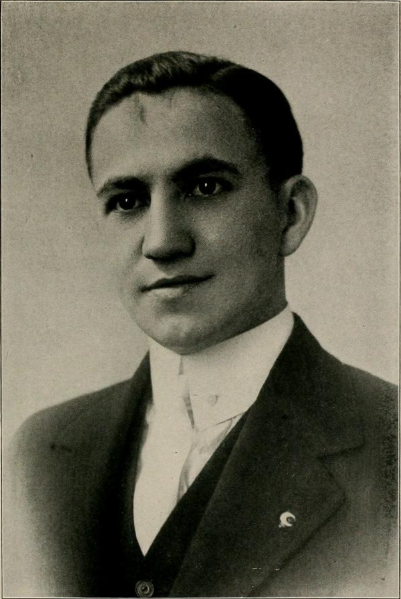

52nd Mayor of the City of Flint, Michigan
- In office 1915–1916
- Preceded by: John R. MacDonald
- Succeeded by: Earl F. Johnson

58th Mayor of the City of Flint, Michigan
- In office 1922–1923
- Preceded by: Edwin W. Atwood
- Succeeded by: David R. Cuthbertson

61st Mayor of the City of Flint, Michigan
- In office 1927–1928
- Preceded by: Judson L. Transue
- Succeeded by: Ray A. Brownell

64th / 2nd City Commission Mayor of the City of Flint, Michigan
- In office 1931–1933
- Preceded by: Harvey J. Mallery
- Succeeded by: Ray A. Brownell

City Commissioner of the City of Flint, Michigan

Personal details
- Born: July 1, 1886 Cleveland, Ohio, U.S.
- Died: September 15, 1957 (aged 71) Miami, Florida, U.S.
- Party: Republican

William Henry McKeighan (July 1, 1886 – September 15, 1957) was a Michigan politician and state political boss based in Flint. Together with Detroit Mayor Ed Barnard and Grand Rapids politician-businessman Frank D. McKay form a Republican political triumvirate with ties to the Purple Gang of Detroit.

== Biography ==
William H. McKeighan was born in 1886 in Cleveland. In Saginaw, he attended high school. He moved to Flint in 1908, initially working in a drug store. A year later, he opened his own pharmacy. McKeighan established a "base of operations at Leith Street and Industrial Avenue" where he owned a barber shop and pool hall, then organized his political machine.

McKeighan in 1913 was elected as a Flint city alderman at age 27. He was elected five times to the office of Mayor of City of Flint. His first time was in 1915 for a single 1-year term then again in 1922 defeating Marvin C. Barney, Citizens Party candidate. On April 3, 1923, he was defeated in the race for mayor by David R. Cuthbertson. He was elected as mayor again in 1927. A recall election to remove McKeighan in 1927 failed during which the police arrested recall supporters. In 1928, he faced conspiracy charges.

McKeighan was under investigation for a multitude of crimes and ticked off the rest of the city leaders that they pushed for changes in the city charter to a council-manager form with the council called commission. So, he ran the "Green Slate" of candidates who won in 1931 and 1932 that he was selected Flint Mayor in 1931 by the other City Commissioners. He entered the 1932 primary Governor of Michigan race. In 1940, he was a delegate to the Republican National Convention from Michigan. Along with his political ally, Frank D. McKay, McKeighan was charged with conspiracy to violate state liquor laws in 1945; he was given a judge-directed verdict of not guilty.

Political offices
Preceded by John R. MacDonald	Mayor of Flint; 1915–1916	Succeeded by Earl F. Johnson
Preceded by Edwin W. Atwood	Mayor of Flint; 1922–1923	Succeeded by David R. Cuthbertson
Preceded by Judson L. Transue	Mayor of Flint; 1927–1928	Succeeded by Ray A. Brownell
Preceded by Harvey J. Mallery	Mayor of Flint; 1931–1933	Succeeded by Ray A. Brownell
