= Flint Community Players =

Theatre company

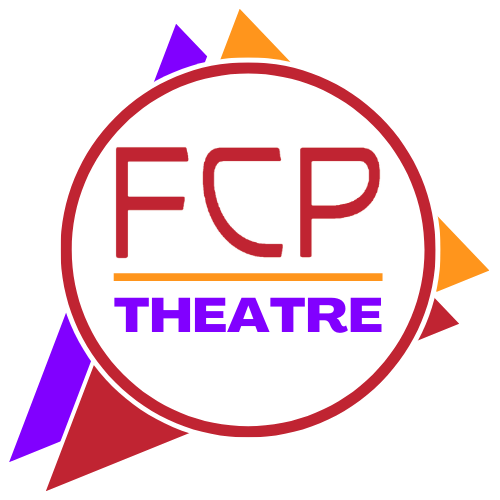
- Flint Community Players' Logo, Designed by Tomoko Miller
- Formation: 1929
- Type: Community Theatre
- Purpose: Musicals, Plays, Dramas, Comedies
- Location: 2462 S Ballenger Hwy, Flint, MI 48507
- Website: www.flintcommunityplayers.com

Flint Community Players is a non-profit theatre organization based in Flint, Michigan and founded in 1929.

== Founding ==
Officially founded in 1929, Flint Community Players (FCP) is Genesee County's oldest community theatre.

In 1928 a group of Flint locals began to meet to read and study plays. When the Wright Players (a professional theatre group performing in Flint) disbanded there was a hole left in the Flint performing arts scene. The study group decided to fill this hole by producing amateur productions. They called themselves the Flint Theatre Guild. Led by Bertha Creighton, on June 27, 1929, the Flint Theatre Guild put on their first production, Meet the Wife, performed at Flint Central High School. After a successful first production the group produced a show a week for the next five weeks.

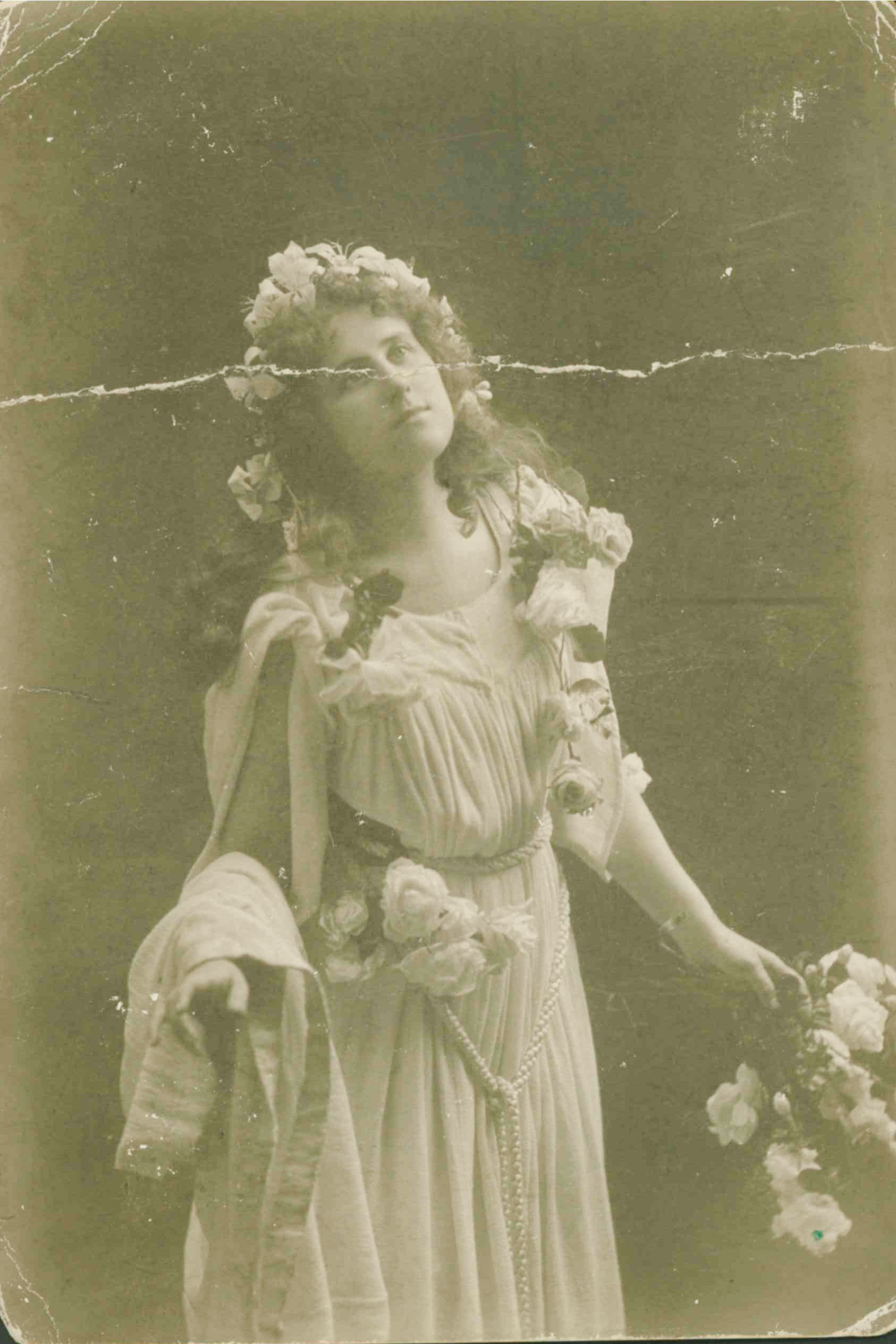
One of FCP's Founders, Bertha Creighton

After their first year, R. Stanley Clarke took over the direction of Flint Theatre Guild and moved them to the Industrial Mutual Association Auditorium. The guild took on the name the Industrial Mutual Association Playhouse, after the location they were performing in. This venue was far too large for the group at 6,000 seats. In April 1930 they moved to facilities provided by the News-Advertiser, a local newspaper. At this time the group held a meeting of the members and elected a board of directors. They became incorporated under the name Flint Playhouse Association. The trustees were E. A. Atwood, Arthur M. Davison, R. Spencer Bishop, E. H. Watson, and Harlow H. Curtice. The papers of incorporation were not renewed the next year, and the group took on another new name, Flint Community Players.

In 1945 Flint Community Players incorporated again with a new constitution.

== Venue ==
Flint Community Players' returned to Flint Central High School in 1933 and remained there until 1945 when they moved to Homedale Elementary School. Sets were built elsewhere and moved to the performance venue.

In 1949, after the death of her husband Fred, Adah Swan donated her house on East Street to FCP. Due to zoning issues, FCP was unable to use the property as a performance space. FCP sold the property and the funds were placed in a trust. Performances again moved to Freeman Elementary School in 1951 because of inadequate space at Homedale.

In 1958 FCP performed their first production at the F.A. Bower Theater. While the Bower gave FCP a performance space, they still did not have space to rehearse, build sets, or store props, costumes, and set pieces. To solve this FCP purchased land on Ballenger Highway to build a workshop. The new workshop was dedicated on December 13, 1959.

In 1991 the Ballenger Highway workshop was expanded. This expansion added a kitchen, laundry room, rehearsal hall, costuming area, offices and a foyer.

In 2012 the Ballenger Highway location was expanded again to add dressing rooms and a performance hall. The new performance hall allowed FCP to be entirely self-contained. On September 13th, 2012, FCP held their first performance in the new hall, Cabaret.
