= Susan E. Borrego =

Chancellor of the University of Michigan–Flint from 2014 to 2019

8th Chancellor of the University of Michigan–Flint
- In office August 1, 2014 – July 31, 2019
- Preceded by: Ruth J. Person
- Succeeded by: Debasish Dutta

Personal details
- Education: Northwest Nazarene College, Azusa Pacific University, and Claremont Graduate School
- Profession: Educator; Administrator,(Professor)

Dr. Susan E. Borrego was the second woman chancellor and eighth chancellor of the University of Michigan–Flint. and also served as interim president at the University of California, Stanislaus.

== Career ==
Borrego was raised in Detroit. Borrego received her Bachelor of Arts degree in speech and communication from Northwest Nazarene College. She went on to receive a Master of Arts in Social Science: Student Development from Azusa Pacific University, and her Ph.D. in education from Claremont Graduate School.

Prior to being appointed chancellor at University of Michgain-Flint, Borrego served as the vice president for enrollment management, planning, and student affairs at California State University, Dominguez Hills. Borrego had been vice president for student affairs at California State University, Monterey Bay, and assistant vice chancellor for student affairs and associate vice chancellor/dean of students at the University of Arkansas. She served at California Institute of Technology during the 1990s where she developed the university's first high-achievement program for under-represented students.

On April 17, 2014, she was approved by the Board of Regents of the University of Michigan as the eighth chancellor of the University of Michigan–Flint, beginning a five-year appointment on August 1, 2014.

== Personal life ==
Borrego and her partner, Mary Boyce, are the parents of two adult children and eight grandchildren.
