= University of Michigan (disambiguation) =

The University of Michigan is a public research university located in Ann Arbor, Michigan, United States.

The Regents of the University of Michigan also administers two separately-accredited campuses:

- University of Michigan–Dearborn in Dearborn, Michigan
- University of Michigan–Flint in Flint, Michigan
