= Ruth J. Person =

American university administrator

7th Chancellor of the University of Michigan–Flint
- In office August 18, 2008 – July 31, 2014
- Preceded by: Juan E. Mestas
- Succeeded by: Susan E. Borrego

Personal details
- Education: Gettysburg College; University of Michigan; Harvard University; George Washington University
- Profession: Educator; Administrator

Ruth J. Person was the first woman and the seventh chancellor of the University of Michigan–Flint. In January 2014, she announced her intention to resign as chancellor and return to the faculty in the University of Michigan–Flint School of Management in January 2015. Her term as chancellor ended on July 31, 2014.
