= Mona Haydar =

Syrian-American rapper and activist

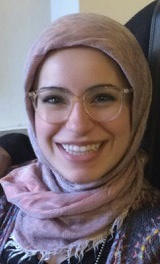
- Haydar at Union Theological Seminary
- Born: 18 May 1988 (age 38)
- Spouse: Sebastian

Mona Haydar (born 18 May 1988) is a Syrian-American rapper, poet, activist, and chaplain. Her EP is Barbarican (2018), and she is best known for her viral song "Hijabi (Wrap My Hijab)," a protest song.

== Early life and education ==
Haydar was raised, along with her seven siblings, in Flint, Michigan. Her parents immigrated to the United States from Damascus, Syria, in 1971.

At 14 years old, Haydar began performing spoken word poetry in Flint at open mics and poetry shows downtown. There she developed her act and was taught to use poetry as a way to tell stories she felt were largely ignored or intentionally skewed by the mainstream media. Haydar was mentored by the majority Black artist community in Flint who taught her to use her voice as a way to heal white supremacy and tell true stories. One such mentor was Dr. Traci Currie, then a professor at the University of Michigan-Flint.

In 2011, after graduating from the University of Michigan-Flint, Haydar left the US and studied at Jami' Abu-Noor in Damascus, Syria. When the Syrian conflict erupted, Haydar's studies in Islamic spirituality were cut short and she moved back to Flint.

Haydar has a master's degree in Social Ethics from Union Theological Seminary.

In 2012, Haydar left Flint where she had been working as a substitute teacher and moved off grid to an inter-spiritual community and retreat center called Lama Foundation. There she met and married her husband, Sebastian.

== Early career ==
In 2015, Haydar and her husband, Sebastian, set up a stand in Cambridge, Massachusetts, inviting people to “Talk to a Muslim,” offering them coffee, donuts, and flowers as a means to “replace trauma with love.” Haydar gained an audience after her social media post about their project went viral, and it helped her reach an international audience. Her music and show, The Great Muslim American Road Trip, is a continuation of that work.

== Career ==
Haydar is the co-host of the PBS show "The Great Muslim American Road Trip" which aired in July 2022. The show follows Mona and her husband Sebastian "on a cross-country journey along historic Route 66. As they meet new friends and explore more than a dozen stops, Mona and Sebastian weave a colorful story about what it means to be Muslim in America today." The couple spent weeks on the road meeting people all along Route 66 to hear the story of Muslims in America starting from the earliest stories (pre-USA) like that of Mustafa Azzemmouri, a Moroccan enslaved by the Spanish and forcibly brought to North America with the Conquistadors as a navigator and skilled linguist as well as the stories of the enslaved West-African-Muslims who were sold into chattel slavery in the early US history. The show highlights these historical stories as well as modern stories of Muslims in the now US.

In 2016, at 6 months pregnant with her second child, Haydar was at the Standing Rock Indian Reservation, taking a stand with the native peoples of the U.S in opposition to the Key Stone Pipeline. Her song "American", from her EP Barbarican, speaks to some of her experiences there.

Haydar appeared in the 2016 Microsoft holiday campaign “#SpreadHarmony”, shot by Jake Scott.

Haydar's debut song, "Hijabi (Wrap My Hijab)", went viral. Billboard named this 2017 single one of “The 20 Best Protest Songs of 2017” as well as one of the “Top 25 Feminist Anthems." The song builds bridges of hope and understanding while dispelling myths, correcting stereotypes, and educating the world about who she is and what she stands for. The song launched her career as well as creating positive reception.

NPR called her debut video for “Hijabi (Wrap My Hijab)" “reminiscent of Lemonade”, and that the visuals “channel Beyonce”. The video was included by the De Young Museum in San Francisco in an exhibit on Muslim women's fashions in 2018.

Haydar's second single "Dog" featured Jackie Cruz of Orange Is the New Black. The video featured a public service announcement about violence against women, taking on the global problem of toxic patriarchy. Her other song, "Suicide Doors", was written to deal with the suicide of one of her friends. The culture of Flint is the reason Haydar became a lover, student and creator in hip hop culture. She cites the likes of Mos Def, Lupe Fiasco, Lauryn Hill and others as inspirations to her for representing themselves and their religion in music proudly and without compromise.

In 2018, Haydar spoke alongside Katie Couric at the media festival SXSW. She also appeared in Couric's National Geographic show America Inside Out. On March 28, 2018, she was featured on the CBS Evening News for her "resistance music".

The Emmy-nominated series The Secret Life of Muslims by Josh Seftel featured her and Sebastian. Their episode remains the most viewed episode of the series. In July 2018, Haydar appeared on Marcus Samuelsson's PBS show No Passport Required, where she showed him around the studio where she recorded her first two songs. In November 2018, Haydar released her song "Lifted". "Lifted" encourages community building and healing from imperial and colonial wounds through the strategies she learned from James H. Cone and others while getting her master's.

Her debut 2018 EP Barbarican was met with positive reviews.

In 2020, Haydar took part in the online Call to Unite program, which was started by Tim Shriver to help those most vulnerable during the COVID-19 pandemic. She performed a song live as part of the event.

== Education ==
Haydar received her Bachelors of Arts from the University of Michigan-Flint in English literature. She received her master's degree in Social Ethics from the Union Theological Seminary in the City of New York. She did her field work at New York University and worked as a chaplain at NYU at that time.

== Discography ==
- Barbarican (2018)
