= Industrial Mutual Association Auditorium =

- Formerly listed on the U.S. National Register of Historic Places
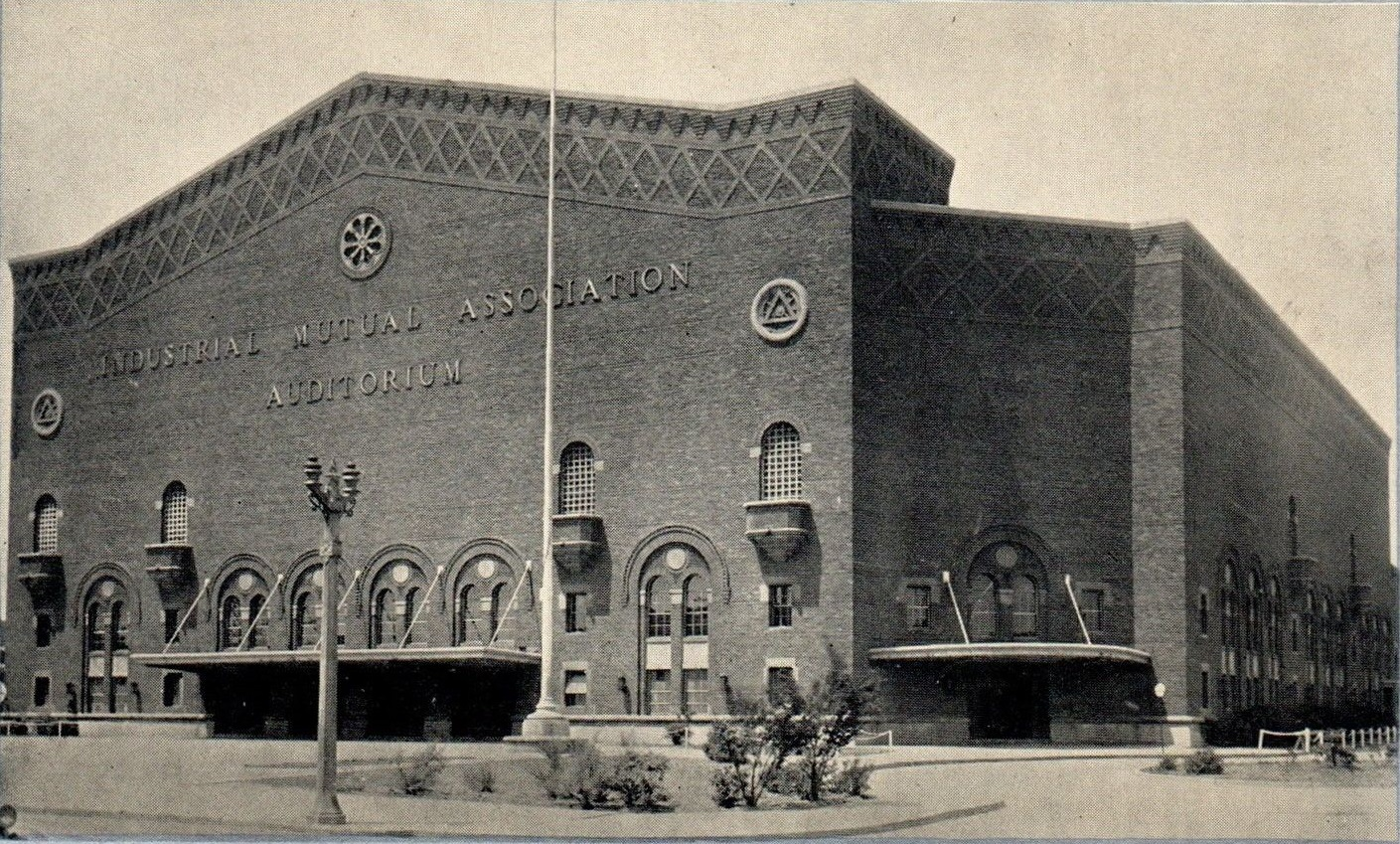
- Interactive map
- Location: 815 E. 2nd Ave., Flint, Michigan
- Coordinates: 43°1′15″N 83°41′29″W
- Area: 1.5 acres (0.61 ha)
- Built: 1929
- Architect: Smith, Hinchman & Grylls
- Architectural style: Romanesque Revival
- Demolished: 1997
- NRHP reference No.: 83000849

Significant dates
- Added to NRHP: July 28, 1983
- Removed from NRHP: November 12, 1997

The Industrial Mutual Association Auditorium was an auditorium located at 815 East 2nd Avenue in Flint, Michigan.

In 1901, the Flint Vehicle Factories Mutual Benefit Association (FVFMBA) was established by manufacturers in the Flint area. The Association provided benefits to workers in the event of sickness, injury or death, and was funded by contributions from their paychecks. In 1915, the Industrial Fellowship League (IFL) was founded by Charles Stewart Mott, with Walter P. Chrysler as chairman. The League offered workers recreational and educational activities. In 1922, the FVFMBA and the IFL merged to form the Industrial Mutual Association of Flint.

In 1927, the IMA purchased the Randall Lumber and Coal Company property in downtown Flint. There, they constructed an athletic park and an auditorium. The auditorium was constructed in 1929 at a cost of $1.2 million, and financed through mandatory deductions from local autoworkers' pay. The Auditorium served as the venue for many of Flint's athletic, entertainment and social events for the next 50 years. The IMA eventually sold the Auditorium to the Charles Stewart Mott Foundation.

The building was a six-story Romanesque Revival structure that contained halls, offices, gymnasiums, and an auditorium that seated nearly 7000 people.

The last event hosted by the Auditorium occurred in 1979. It was added to the National Register of Historic Places in 1983.

The Auditorium was incorporated into the AutoWorld theme park, which opened in 1984 and limped along until closing permanently in 1994. After two years of staying dormant, the IMA Auditorium was imploded on February 23, 1997. The implosion event was broadcast by WJRT-TV. In November that year, it was removed from the NHRP. The location where it once stood is now a part of the University of Michigan–Flint campus.
