= Juan E. Mestas =

6th Chancellor of the University of Michigan–Flint
- In office September 1999 – July 2007
- Succeeded by: Ruth J. Person

Personal details
- Born: Cuba
- Education: University of Puerto Rico; Stony Brook University
- Profession: Educator; Administrator

Dr. Juan E. Mestas was formerly the deputy chairman of the National Endowment for the Humanities (NEH) and the former chancellor of the University of Michigan-Flint.

Previously Mestas taught at Portland State University, and before that he was director of Educational Access Services, director of Educational Opportunity Programs, and associate director of Student Development Programs at California State University. He has coordinated leadership programs sponsored by the American Council on Education (ACE); served as an ACE/Pew fellow at the University of Pennsylvania; directed San Jose State University's Upward Bound Program, which the U.S. Department of Education considered one of the nation's most successful college preparatory programs for economically disadvantaged and academically underprepared high school students; and chaired the Puerto Rican Studies Program at Stony Brook University. Author of El pensamiento social de Jose Martí: ideología y cuestión obrera (Madrid: Editorial Pliegos, 1993), he holds a Ph.D. and an M.A. from Stony Brook University in Hispanic Languages and Literature and a B.A. from Universidad de Puerto Rico in Hispanic Studies.
