= Industrial Mutual Association =

Nonprofit organization

- Industrial Mutual Association of Flint
- Abbreviation: IMA
- Formation: September 22, 1922; 104 years ago
- Founded at: Flint, Michigan, United States
- Dissolved: 2008; 18 years ago
- Merger of: Flint Vehicle Factories Mutual Benefit Association and The Industrial Fellowship League
- Type: 501(c)(4) organization
- Tax ID no.: 38-0677900
- Headquarters: Burton, Michigan, United States
- Revenue: US$2,063,354 (2007); US$2,404,407 (2006)
- Expenses: US$2,070,568 (2007); US$2,668,422 (2006)

The Industrial Mutual Association of Flint (commonly known as the Industrial Mutual Association or by its abbreviation IMA) was a 501(c)(4) nonprofit organization whose focus was to benefit the workers and families of workers of General Motors.

== History ==
The Industrial Mutual Association was formed on September 22, 1922, with the merger of the Flint Vehicle Factories Mutual Benefit Association and the Industrial Fellowship League.

The organization reported to the Internal Revenue Service with its 2008 Form 990 that it had discontinued its operations. On January 1, 2019, the organization transferred its remaining assets, worth US$2,610,679 at the time, to the IMA Recreation Association.

=== Flint Vehicle Factories Mutual Benefit Association ===
The Flint Vehicle Factories Mutual Benefit Association (originally known as the Flint Vehicle Factory Mutual Benefit Association and sometimes referred to as the Flint Vehicle Factories Mutual Association) was founded by Josiah Dallas Dort to provide insurance for workers of General Motors automobile factories.

=== Industrial Fellowship League ===
The Industrial Fellowship League was formed within the YMCA by Charles Stewart Mott to provide recreational and educational activities to workers of automobile factories.

== Activities ==
The Industrial Mutual Association provided services and activities meant to benefit the workers and families of workers of General Motors.

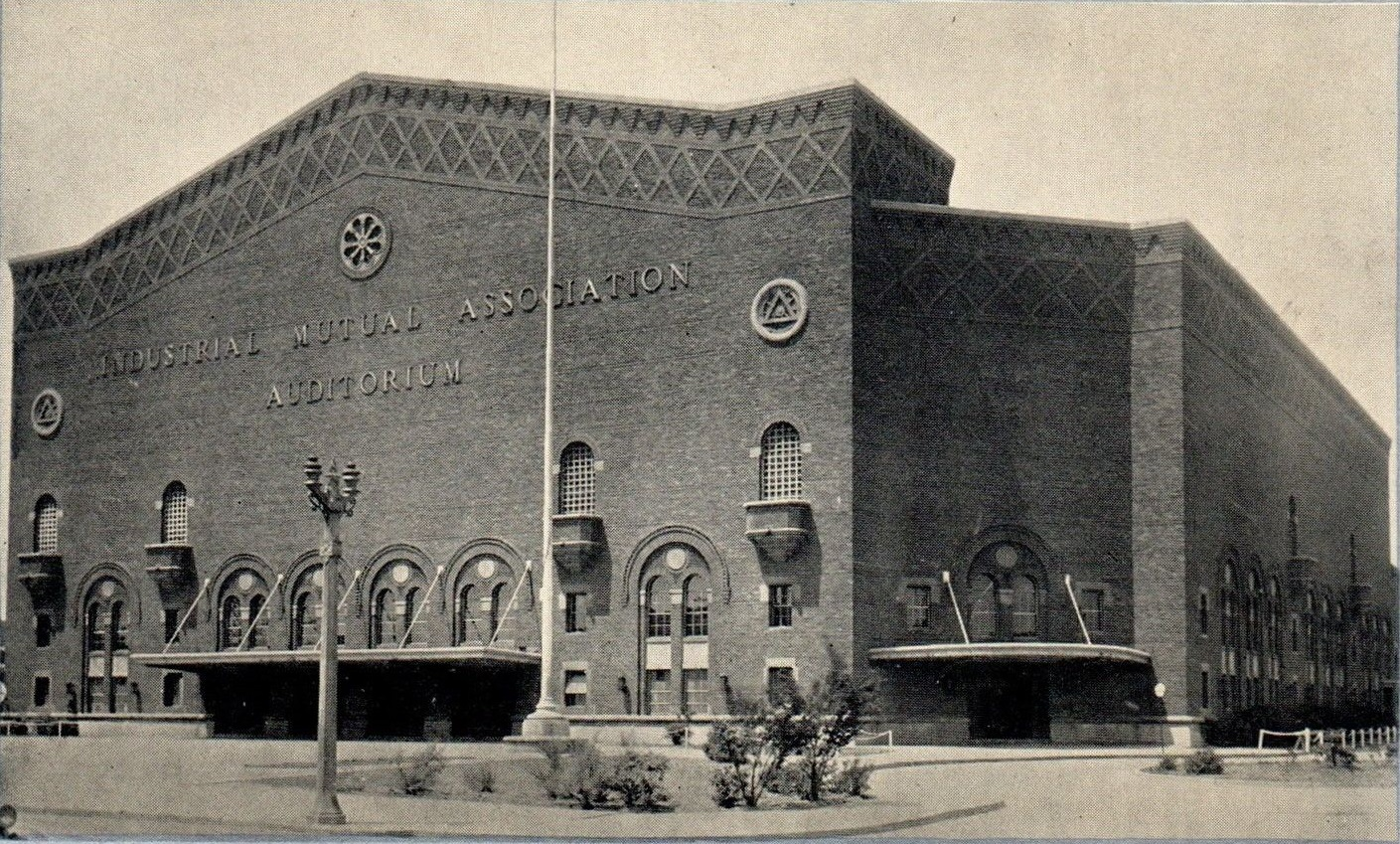
Industrial Mutual Association Auditorium, circa 1925

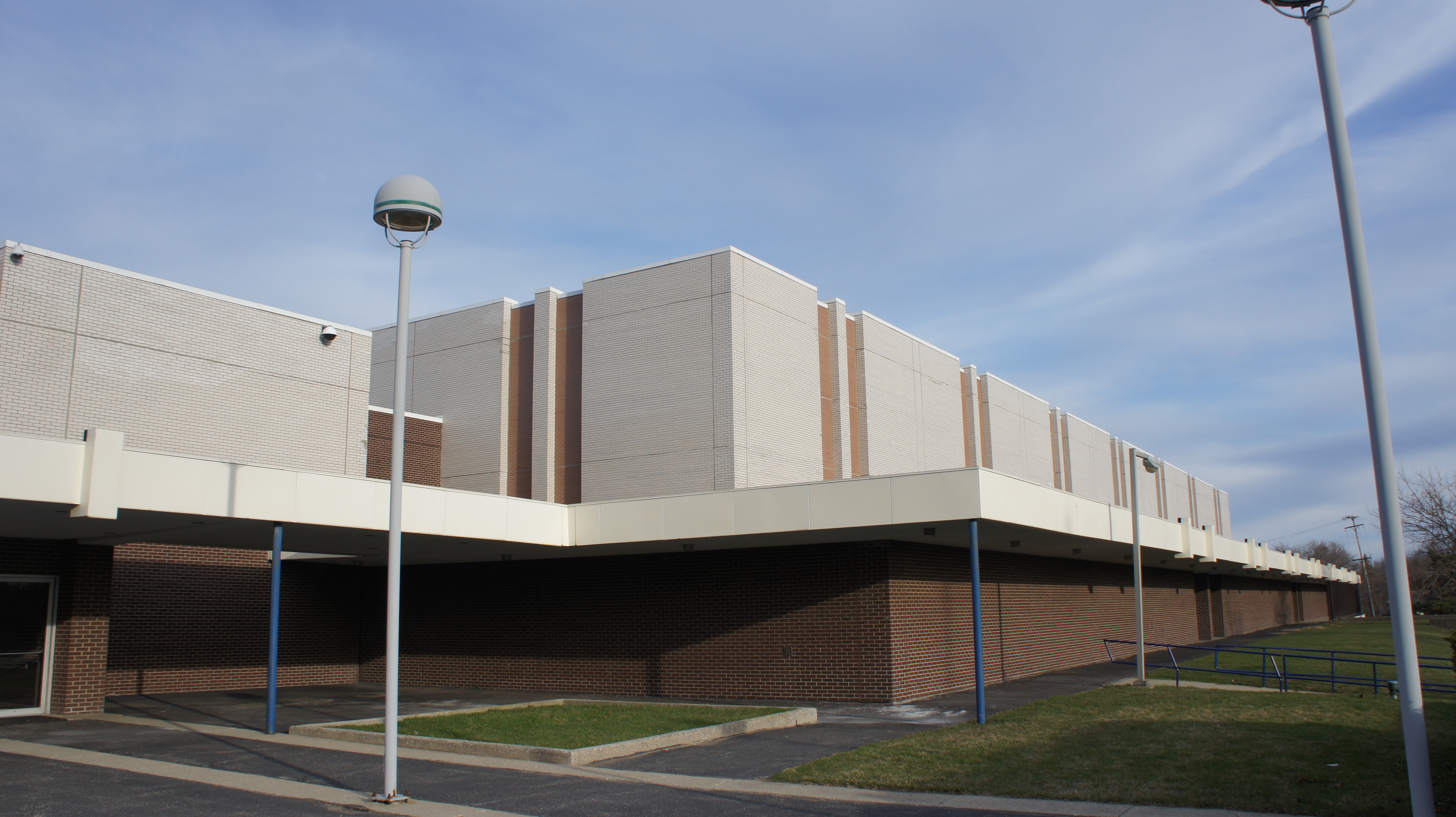
Exterior of Dort Financial Center in March 2016

In 1929, it built the Industrial Mutual Association Auditorium on the former site of the Randall Lumber and Coal Company, and the previous site of the Crapo Sawmill, for US$1,200,000 (equivalent to $22,500,000 in 2025). Its final major event was a Peter Frampton concert held on June 1, 1979. The auditorium was sold to the Mott Foundation for US$2,400,000 (equivalent to $10,646,492 in 2025) and was incorporated into the AutoWorld theme park, which opened in July 1984 and closed in 1994. The building was imploded in February 1997.

In 1969, the association built the IMA Sports Arena (today known as the Dort Financial Center) for US$10,000,000 (equivalent to $87,794,918 in 2025). It sold the arena to the city of Flint in 1980.

At the time of their dissolution, the organization's activities included providing recreational activities to workers of General Motors, such as golf, softball, hockey, basketball, chess, quilting, soccer, karate, and theatre. They also provided food services at recreation facilities including concessions and catering services.

== See also ==
- Dort Financial Center
- Industrial Mutual Association Auditorium
