= AutoWorld (theme park) =

Former indoor theme park in Flint, Michigan

- Interactive map of AutoWorld
- Location: Flint, Michigan
- Coordinates: 43°01′15″N 83°41′29″W
- Status: Defunct
- Opened: July 4, 1984
- Closed: 1994

AutoWorld was an indoor theme park in Flint, Michigan, United States, developed as a tourist attraction for its host city. It opened as Six Flags AutoWorld on July 4, 1984, and closed for the first time just six months later, closing permanently in 1994 before its demolition three years later.

On the grand opening of AutoWorld, then-Governor James J. Blanchard said it would trigger "the rebirth of the great city of Flint."

== Origins ==
The idea for AutoWorld originated as early as 1969, when Joseph Anderson, retired manager of AC Spark Plug, "recalled that Harding Mott, president of the Mott Foundation was angry because of a news story from California about students burying a Chevrolet to emphasize their antagonism towards cars" and wanted to show the importance of the automobile to society. However, former mayor of Flint, James W. Rutherford, attributes the idea for AutoWorld to Anderson. A second possible origin for the idea of AutoWorld is Harding Mott discussing the need for the Flint community "to get its pride together" because "after all, [Flint is] one of the main centers in the history of automaking."

== Planning ==
AutoWorld was one element of Flint's overall downtown redevelopment plan in the 1960s and 1970s. Initially, the idea was to build a hall of fame for the automobile in Flint. On April 2, 1970, civic leaders from Flint met at the Consumers Power Co. lodge at Tippy Dam on the Big Manistee River to discuss the redevelopment of the central city of Flint. This meeting led to the establishment of the Flint Area Conference, Inc. (FACI), a non-profit corporation with the stated purpose "of an organization of civic and business leaders working with public officials in an effort to meet unfilled physical and economic needs of the community."

After the meeting at Tippy Dam, a committee headed by Anderson was founded to study the idea for an automotive hall of fame. The committee commissioned Yamasaki and Associates of Troy, Michigan, to produce a plan for the hall of fame to be built on an island in the Flint River, which was the first plan for AutoWorld. Over the next decade, between 1970 and 1980, several other plans and designs were commissioned, playing roles of varying importance to the development of AutoWorld. In 1978, C. W. Shaver & Company, Inc., developed a plan to create "a National Institute to demonstrate the impact of the automobile" and "a people-attraction in downtown Flint centered around the automobile." The project was called "A National Institute of Automotive Science and History (AutoWorld)."

In 1980, the C. S. Mott Foundation and the FACI received a market support update from Hammer, Siler, George Associates, which included updated projections based on their initial study of 1976. This updated plan "retains an automotive theme but incorporates many theme park elements" and states, "AutoWorld will contain several rides and shows as well as highly participatory displays and a wide variety of retail and restaurant outlets." AutoWorld was to contain elements of a theme park but on a smaller scale, indoors, and with more attractions for visitors of all ages. This plan included attendance projections and predicted that residents of Flint would comprise the majority of AutoWorld attendees based on projections from other similar theme parks.

The final plan for AutoWorld came from Randall Duell Associates, and Recreation Consultants of Santa Clara, headed by David L. Brown, completed a Feasibility Study of AutoWorld for FACI. The plan revealed that projected attendance for the first year would be 750,000 and approximately 1 million for the next year.

=== Financial support ===
The project received financial support from various private and public sources, including $11 million from the Mott Foundation, $36.5 million in public funds, $4 million from local donors, $9 million from Capital Income Properties, and $1 million from GM.

== Operation ==
After fifteen years of planning, AutoWorld opened on July 4, 1984, with great fanfare, including a parade. For $8.95 a ticket, visitors could enter what was promoted as "the largest enclosed theme park in the world."

During the first month of operation, AutoWorld hit its turnstile target: From July 4 to August 4, 1984, 139,970 people visited the park. Most experts predicted that AutoWorld would draw one million visitors per year; however, it soon became clear that these figures were overestimated. By the fall of 1984, attendance had already begun to decrease. Although business increased on holidays and weekends, during the week, the attraction was mostly empty. When it became clear that AutoWorld would not reach its attendance target, financiers moved to close the park down.

=== Attractions ===
Inside AutoWorld's dome, there were a variety of attractions, including a replica of historic downtown Flint, designed to depict Saginaw Street as it appeared in 1900. This simulation included a flowing river, comfortable benches, and "$500,000 worth of tropical plants and trees."

The first display that visitors encountered was a small cabin, inside of which was a mannequin designed to look like Jacob Smith, the founder of Flint. Pushing a red button on the outside of the cabin started a film that was projected onto the mannequin's face. The mannequin/film would welcome the visitor to AutoWorld and talk about the beginning of Flint. Other attractions included a ferris wheel and a carousel, a carnival ride through "The Humorous History of Automobility," and several shops and restaurants.

Inside section housed in the Industrial Mutual Association (IMA) Auditorium, there was a giant automobile engine, a wall with a rotating display of old brand shields, and an attraction depicting the past, present, and future of automobile assembly, including a mock assembly line operated by robots. AutoWorld also had an IMAX theater and a two-story ramp that exhibited a history of the effect of automobiles in popular culture.

One attraction, a film entitled The Car of Your Dreams, produced by award-winning experience designer Bob Rogers and the design team BRC Imagination Arts, celebrated three decades of automobile mobile industry advertisements, from the early days of television advertising and into the 1980s. The short film, which continues to be in distribution for educational purposes, exemplifies how the automotive industry has long been a master of creating and manipulating images of desirable lifestyles to sell a product.

== Closure ==
In December 1984, AutoWorld announced it would only be open on weekends throughout the rest of the winter. In January 1985, investors closed AutoWorld completely. Initially, there were efforts to keep AutoWorld in operation. There were efforts, planned for May 1987, to open AutoWorld with "weekend only operation with seasonal operation as a theme park and festival center."

Although AutoWorld would open for several brief periods throughout the following years, Michigan's depressed economy continued to scare away tourists and investors. AutoWorld closed permanently in 1994. After the closure, there were several proposals for redevelopment, including a casino, but that plan was rejected in 1994. The Flint Downtown Development Authority (DDA) gave the land to the University of Michigan-Flint, and the park was demolished in early 1997. The land is currently home to the University of Michigan-Flint's William S. White Building, which houses the nursing program and College of Health Sciences.

== References in popular culture ==
AutoWorld was featured in the 1989 Michael Moore film Roger & Me. Footage of AutoWorld being demolished was shown in Moore's 1997 film The Big One.
