= Debasish Dutta =

American academic

Debasish (Deba) Dutta
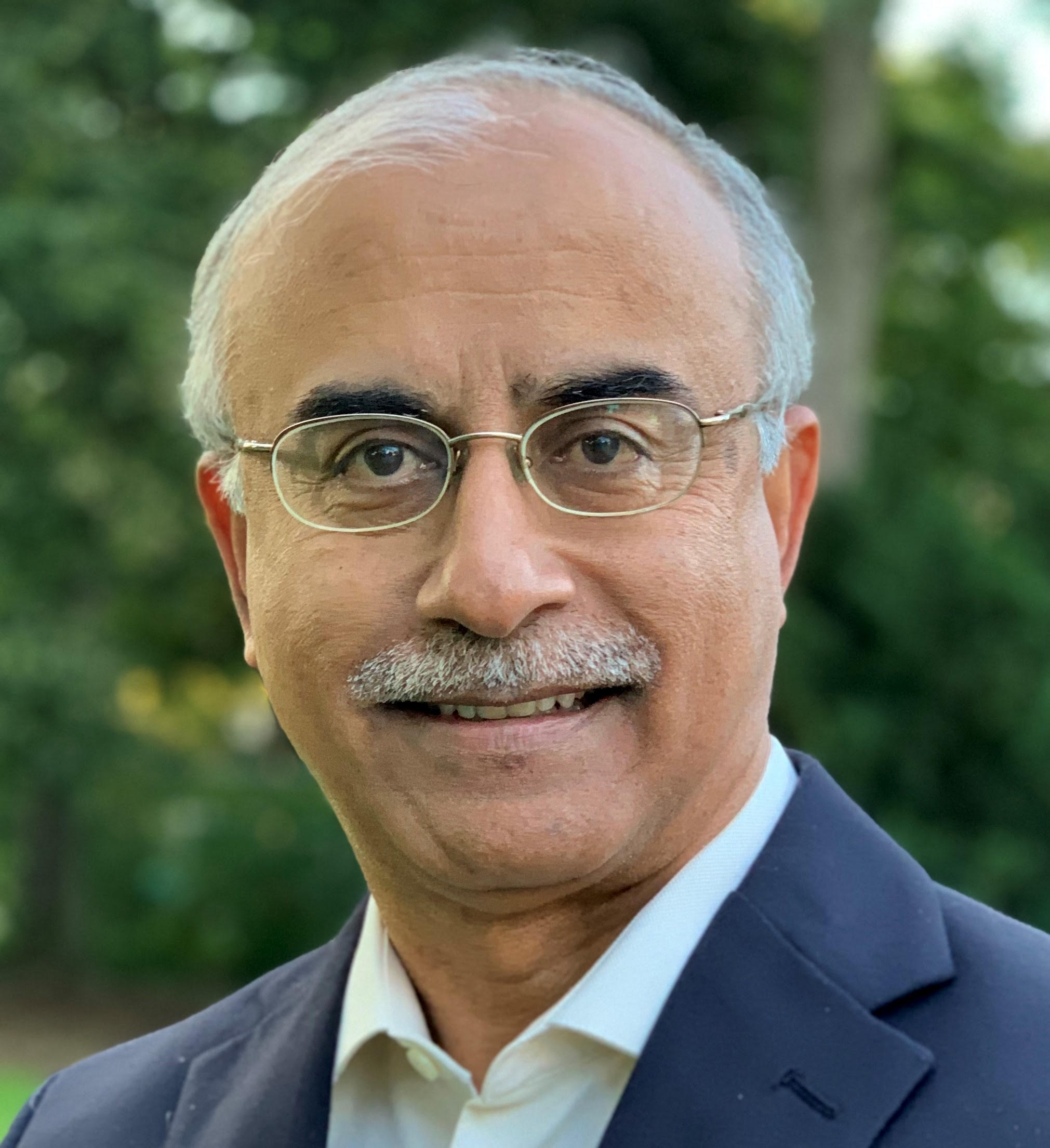

Sr. Advisor to the President University of Illinois System
- Incumbent
- Assumed office September 2023
- Scientific career
- Fields: Mechanical Engineering; Industrial Engineering
- Workplaces: University of Michigan, Ann Arbor; National Science Foundation; University of Illinois, Urbana-Champaign; Purdue University

Debasish "Deba" Dutta is an American mechanical engineer and higher education administrator. He is currently senior advisor to the president of the University of Illinois System and has served (2024–2026) as interim executive director of the Discovery Partners Institute.

Dutta has held various leadership positions, both at large public research universities and smaller regional institutions. He has served as Chancellor at Rutgers University–New Brunswick, at University of Michigan-Flint as Chancellor, as Provost and Executive Vice President of Academic Affairs and Diversity at Purdue University, and as Associate Provost and Dean of the Graduate College at University of Illinois Urbana-Champaign. He was Distinguished Professor of Engineering at Rutgers University—New Brunswick and Edward and Jane Marr Gutgsell Professor at University of Illinois at Urbana-Champaign. Dutta is an Elected Fellow of the American Association for the Advancement of Science and American Society of Mechanical Engineers.

== Career ==
=== University of Michigan, Ann Arbor ===
Dutta joined the University of Michigan as assistant professor of mechanical engineering in 1989 after completing his Ph.D. from Purdue University. He earned tenure and became Associate Professor in 1995 and was promoted to full professor in 2000. He was appointed director of the Program in Manufacturing and the founding director of InterPro, a unit established for interdisciplinary professional programs. In 2009, Dutta left University of Michigan to become Dean of the Graduate College at University of Illinois at Urbana-Champaign.

=== National Science Foundation ===
While at U Michigan, in 2004, Dutta was tapped by the National Science Foundation (NSF) to lead Integrative Graduate Education and Research Traineeship (IGERT), the flagship graduate education and research traineeship program at NSF. Later, he was appointed acting director of the Division of Graduate Education, overseeing several education programs across the foundation. Dutta also served as Senior Advisor in the directorate. While at NSF, he helped create new partnerships with the National Institutes of Health and the Office of Naval Research. NSF Director Arden Bement appointed him to the NSF's strategic planning committee where he chaired the Learning and Workforce Development group for the Cyberinfrastructure Vision for the 21st Century.

=== University of Illinois at Urbana-Champaign ===
Dutta served as Associate Provost and Dean of the Graduate College from January 2009 until June 2014. He was responsible for facilitating and nurturing interdisciplinary and multi-disciplinary connections, assuring integrity and quality of graduate programs, and providing essential graduate student services. In 2011, he chaired the steering committee for Stewarding Excellence at Illinois, an institution-wide program for cost control and organizational efficiency created in the face of falling state revenues. He also chaired a campus-wide committee to assess doctoral education at Illinois including the size, quality, effectiveness, demand, and operational costs of individual doctoral programs. At Illinois, he was Edward and Jane Marr Gutgsell Endowed Professor of Mechanical Science and Engineering.

=== National Academy of Engineering ===
Dutta served as a Scholar in Residence at the US National Academy of Engineering and completed two projects: The Lifelong Learning Imperative in Engineering study, completed and published in 2012, and the Educate to Innovate study, completed and published in 2014.

=== Purdue University ===
Starting in July 2014, Dutta served as Provost and Executive Vice President for Academic Affairs at Purdue University. In July 2015, he also assumed the role of Chief Diversity Officer for Purdue. His significant contributions to academic excellence, diversity and student success at Purdue were recognized by a Resolution of Appreciation adopted by the Purdue University Board of Trustees.

When it was announced Dutta would leave Purdue for Rutgers in July 2017, Purdue President Mitch Daniels said of Dutta, "He has made an enormous and positive difference for Purdue and has proven himself an effective change agent in a sector where such people are scarce. Immensely talented leaders often attract the attention of others and so it is in this case."

=== Rutgers University-New Brunswick ===
Dutta was appointed chancellor of Rutgers University-New Brunswick in July 2017. Dutta led the largest Rutgers campus with over 40,000 students, 2,000 faculty, and 5,000 staff. The Faculty Council viewed him as "a model for how administrators should interact with faculty in shared governance relationships.” Dutta created a new administrative structure for the campus to bring focus and accountability to key functional areas. He oversaw the matriculation of the largest first-year class in history, the reversal of a three-year decline in research funding, and increased alumni engagement. Dutta worked extensively with state legislators and business and community leaders to create institutional momentum around student success, affordability, and academic excellence.

On July 25, 2018, Dutta announced his resignation as chancellor, citing misalignment with the University's vision for the chancellorship.

=== University of Michigan-Flint ===
Dutta was appointed eighth chancellor of the University of Michigan-Flint in June 2019. He helped turn around eight consecutive years of enrollment decline, posting a 3% increase in fall 2023 followed by a 6.5% increase in fall 2024. and a 9.1% increase i n fall 2025. In fall 20206, UM-Flint posted a fourth year of enrollment increase (2%) and was one of only three public universities in Michigan that posted an enrollment increase. Since 2023, UM-Flint has increased enrollment by more than 21%. He guided UM-Flint through the pandemic while creating a new College of Innovation and Technology, establishing the first regents-approved bylaws for shared governance, creating several named professorships for faculty, revitalizing and promoting faculty scholarship by creating three research institutes, increasing graduation rates by 10%, and surpassing previous fundraising records. He worked to transform UM-Flint from a primarily teaching institution to a research-active university that increased its year-over-year total awarded research dollars from $1.3M to over $11M in FY2025. He led the efforts to raise $50 million from federal, state, and private sources for the construction of a new Innovation and Technology Complex to make UM-Flint an engine for economic growth. After four years as chancellor of University of Michigan-Flint, Dutta stepped down on September 15, 2023, and joined the University of Illinois as Senior Advisor to the President. In the announcement, Dutta was applauded by the president of University of Michigan for being a strong advocate for UM-Flint and for his commitment and work transforming the institution.
