= University of Michigan–Flint =

Public university in Flint, Michigan, U.S.

University of Michigan-Flint
- Former names: Flint Senior College of the University of Michigan (1956–1965); Flint College of the University of Michigan (1965–1971)
- Motto: Artes, Scientia, Veritas
- Motto in English: Arts, Knowledge, Truth
- Type: Public
- Established: 1956; 70 years ago
- Parent institution: University of Michigan Board of Regents
- Accreditation: HLC
- Academic affiliations: CUMU
- Endowment: $150 million (2021)
- Budget: $151 million (2026-27)
- Chancellor: Laurence B. Alexander
- President: Domenico Grasso
- Provost: Abby Parrill-Baker
- Faculty: 474
- Administrative staff: 518
- Students: 7,124
- Undergraduates: 5,539
- Postgraduates: 1,585
- Location: Flint, Michigan, U.S. 43.0185°N 83.6887°W
- Campus: Urban
- Newspaper: The Michigan Times
- Colors: Maize and blue
- Nicknames: Wolverines; The Victors (unofficial)
- Website: umflint.edu

The University of Michigan–Flint (UM-Flint) is a public university in Flint, Michigan, United States. Founded in 1956 as the Flint Senior College, it was initially established as a remote branch of the University of Michigan, offering upper-division undergraduate courses. The institution expanded into a four-year college in 1965, and received its own accreditation in 1970, then becoming separate from the main University of Michigan and adopting its current name. It is governed by the regents of the University of Michigan, but is otherwise separate from the University of Michigan.

UM-Flint is one of the five doctoral/professional universities in the state of Michigan. Together with Oakland University, the University of Michigan–Dearborn, and Wayne State University, UM-Flint is one of the four Coalition of Urban and Metropolitan Universities (CUMU) members in the State of Michigan.

The university's student-athletes compete in intramural and club sports as the Michigan-Flint Wolverines. Notable alumni include former United States Senator Donald Riegle, Oscar-winning film director Michael Moore, who was an editor for the student newspaper The Michigan Times, and former Flint Mayor Woodrow Stanley.

== History ==
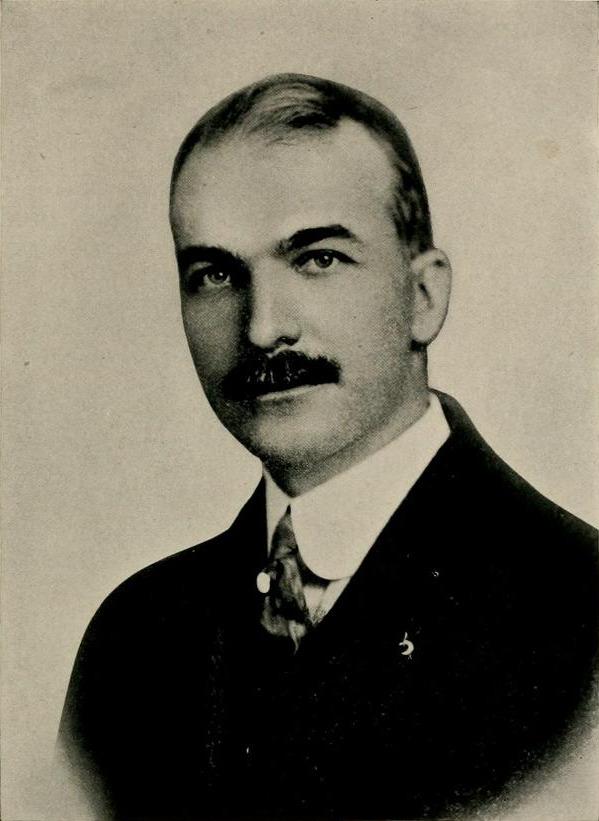
Mayor C.S. Mott, the father of the university, whose pledge in 1946 enabled its establishment

=== Flint Senior College (1956–1965) ===
Former Flint mayor C.S. Mott first suggested bringing a full university to Flint in a meeting with then-President Alexander Ruthven in 1946. Mott pledged to give $1 million to the project if the voters would pass a $7 million bond issue. The University of Michigan initially opposed Mott's idea but, ultimately, agreed to create the Flint Senior College of the University of Michigan as an extension of the existing Flint Junior College (now Mott Community College), while the colleges remained separate institutions.

For a number of years, the college shared the Court Street campus with Flint Junior College. This campus was part of the Flint Cultural Center with major donations from many Flint business leaders. Original donors included the Sponsors Fund of Flint and William Ballenger. The first building constructed in 1954 was The Ballenger Field House. The Mott Memorial Building or simply the Mott Building, built on additional 6.25 acres donated by C. S. Mott, opened in August 1957, was the main academic building for the Flint Senior College, and included a library that served both colleges.

In February 1956, David M. French was named the first dean of the Flint Senior College to begin in mid-March. The official opening ceremonies were held in the field house on September 23, 1956. The college began classes in 1956 with 118 full-time and 49 part-time students. Degrees were offered in liberal arts and sciences and in the professional fields of education and business administration. The college's first class graduated in 1958. From 1958 to 1965, the junior/senior student population grew very modestly and the admissions standards were kept high.

=== Independent proposal and the four-year Flint College (1965–1971) ===
From 1963 to 1964, studies were commissioned to explore the possibility of transforming Flint Senior College into a four-year institution. Subsequently, the Michigan State Board of Education recommended that the college transition into an autonomous four-year institution, phasing out the University of Michigan's involvement in Flint. This proposal was part of a broader statewide trend to grant independence to branch campuses, similar to the transition of Oakland University from Michigan State University during the same period. Proponents of the proposal argued that full independence would enable the college to better serve its academic community with its own governing board. However, the proposal faced opposition from the Flint community, the Flint Board of Education, and C.S. Mott, who threatened to withdraw his pledged support. As a result, the independent proposal was circumvented; instead the Flint Board of Education's proposal that the institution be expanded as a four-year college of the University of Michigan was accepted by the Board of Regents in April 1964, with the hope Flint College of the University of Michigan would start in Fall 1965. In July 1965, eight departments were established in the Flint College.

The expansion to four years open the way for the Flint branch to achieve maturity. The effect on size and academic program was immediate.

In Fall 1965, the first group of freshman, 170 of them, were enrolled. From 1965 to 1971, the student population at the Flint College increased substantially, reaching 2,000 in 1971, along with the trends towards more women, more minority, and more unmarried younger students.

=== University of Michigan–Flint (1971–present) ===
In 1970, Flint College received its own accreditation independent from the main campus in Ann Arbor, from the North Central Association of Colleges and Schools. In March 1971, the Regents named William E. Moran as the first chancellor and then a month later officially changed the name of the institution to the University of Michigan-Flint, both effective July 1, 1971.

The community and city assisted UM–Flint in acquiring 42 acres along the Flint River. $5 million over five years was pledged towards a new campus in 1972 by the C.S. Mott Foundation. During September 1972, sixteen temporary buildings were erected to ease campus overcrowding, pressuring the Regents to move UM-Flint to the 42 acres along the Flint River. In its October 1972 meeting, the Regents adopted unanimously a resolution approving the riverfront site as the main campus for UM-Flint, delineating and appreciating the massive financial support of the citizens and City of Flint.

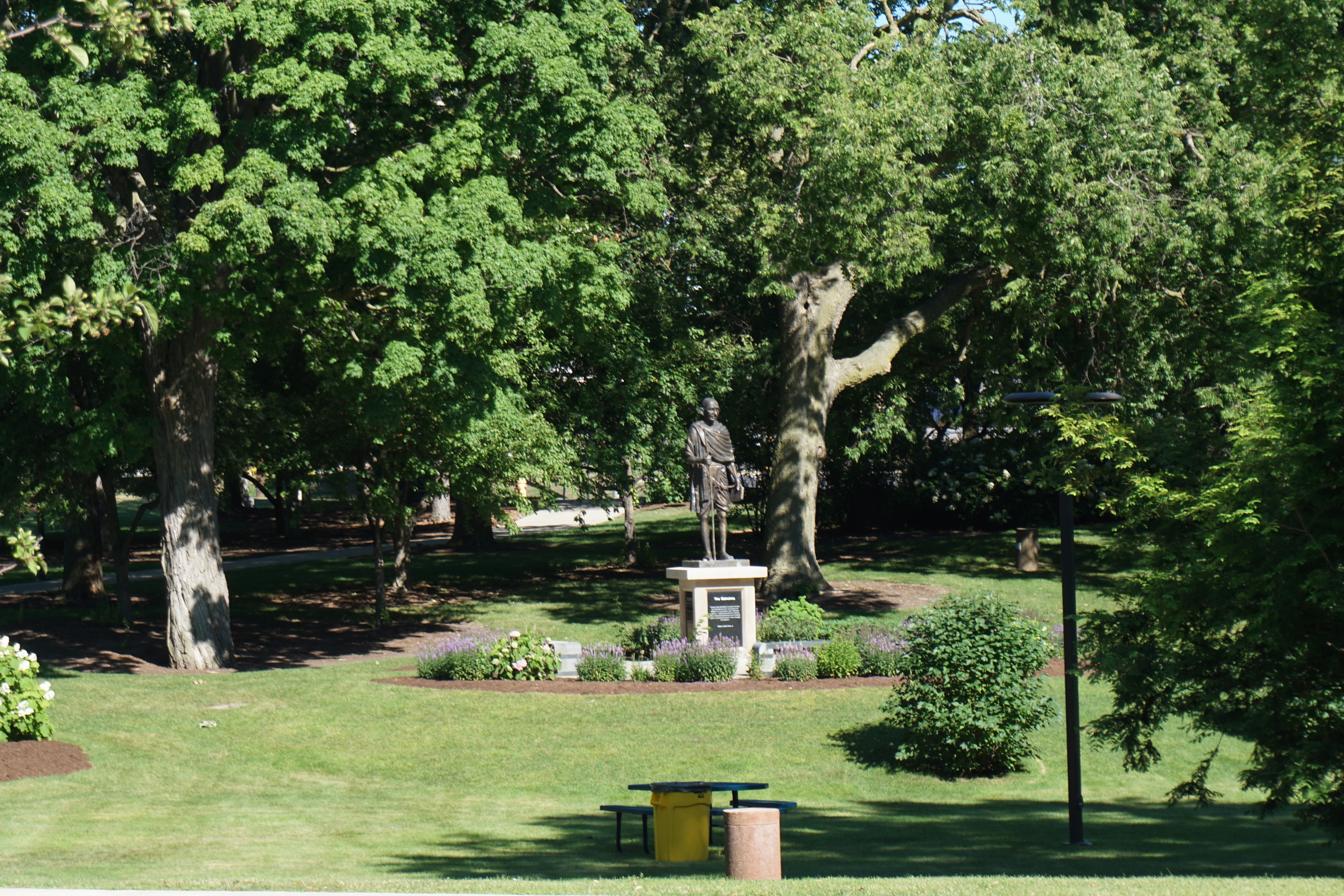
Willson Park at the University of Michigan–Flint

On September 1, 1973, the Regents adopted the designs for the first Class Room and Office Building (CROB) by Sedgewick-Sellers & Associates, originally planned for a site at Lapeer Road and Court Street. Instead, a new master plan had CROB as the first building on the newly acquired 42 acres along the Flint River. Meanwhile, the university acquired the Ross House and the Hubbard Building. The ground breaking ceremony of CROB was held on May 9, 1974, at the Willson Park bandstand. In 1975, UM-Flint separated the School of Management from the liberal arts and education, which was named the College of Arts and Sciences, each with a dean. Construction of CROB and the Central Energy Plant ended in 1977. CROB, with the library moved into its 5th floor and a theatre, was dedicated March 1977, later renamed the David M. French Hall in 2000. In 1979, the original Harrison Street Halo Burger location was vacated to make way for UM-Flint parking, and the Harding Mott University Center (UCen) was finished that same year.

The physical therapy program was moved in 1982 from the Ann Arbor campus to the Flint campus and was housed in the Surge Building. UM-Flint then formed the School of Health Sciences and received regental approval in May 1982 to renovate the Mott Memorial Building, where UM-Flint's science departments were located, for additional laboratories to support the physical therapy program. The Recreation Center was added that year to the riverfront campus.

The Classroom/Laboratory Building was sited on the riverfront campus master plan in 1977 and the schematic designs for it and the University Plaza were approved in 1979. But a severe state downturn delayed further considerations until October 1984, when the preliminary plans were greenlighted to proceed through working drawings for construction. In July 1986 the project budget of $24.7M for the 181,000 square feet building was approved and opened for bids. The contract was awarded to low bidder, Erickson & Lingstrom Construction Co. of Flint in September 1986. The building was completed in 1988 on schedule and within budget. All the classes held at the Mott Memorial Building were moved to the riverfront campus for Fall 1986, to the delight of both faculty and students. In November 1988, the building was named the William S. Murchie Science Building. In September 1989, all rights to the Mott Memorial Building was transferred to the Mott Community College, ending a 33-year University of Michigan presence on the Mott Community College campus.

Prior to the late 1980s, the Ann Arbor School of Nursing controlled both the promotion and tenure of the UM-Flint nursing faculty as well as the UM-Flint nursing curriculum and degree. After the provost secured an agreement with the Ann Arbor School of Nursing dean to discontinue their extraordinary practice of reviewing UM-Flint nursing faculty for promotion and tenure, the Regents in February 1989 dissolved the administrative structure with the Ann Arbor School of Nursing control and granted UM-Flint autonomy over its nursing curriculum and degree. The Regents then approved uniting the two faculties of the nursing program and of the School of Health Sciences into one school named the School of Health Professions and Studies.

In March 1990, Chancellor Jones announced that the City of Flint has offered to lease the struggling Water Street Pavilion to UM-Flint. The news garnered widespread support on campus, where it would address severe space needs, in the Flint community, from the Mott Foundation, and in the state legislature. In September 1990, UM-Flint accepted from the Downtown Development Authority the conveyance of the Water Street Pavilion and Ice Rink, including land, and units 2 and 3 in the Water Street condominium parking deck. In March 1991, Elgin Builders, Inc. was awarded a $3M construction contract to renovate the Pavilion to include retail space and a book store on the first floor and administrative offices on the second floor, freeing up much needed instructional space in CROB.

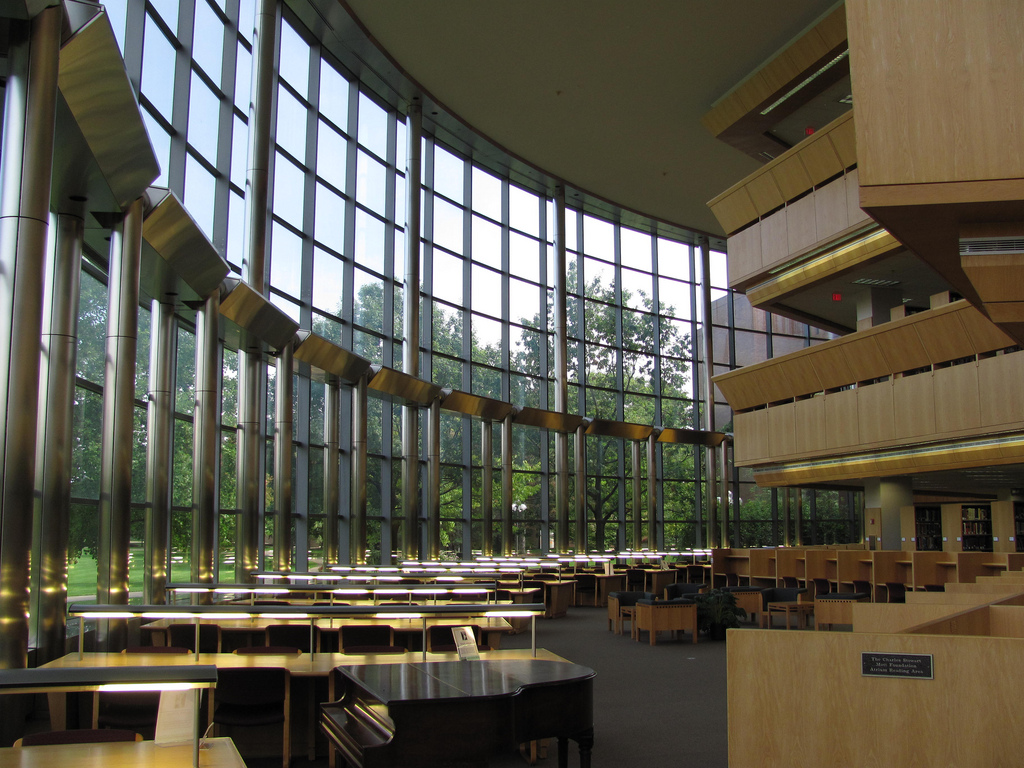
The atrium of the Frances Willson Thompson Library, designed by Gunnar Birkerts and Associates.

The Library/Learning Resources Building, designed by Gunnar Birkerts and Associates in the years following 1985, was planned for a site near Willson Park. After the acquisition of the Water Street Pavilion in September 1990, the master plan was revised in October 1991 with the proposed library relocated to its present site facing the river and named the Frances Willson Thompson Library. Private fund raising for the Library, which went back to the early 1980s, officailly began in 1989, led by Senator Don Riegle and Chancellor Clinton Jones, who reported in May 1992 when the Regents approved the project that $18M had been raised. The funds for the library are entirely from private donations; no state or public money went into the construction of the building. In February 1993, Chancellor Jones informed the Regents that the construction contract has been awarded to the low bidder Walbridge Aldinger Co. of Detroit. On October 17, 1994, the dedication ceremony for Frances Willson Library was held in its atrium.

In November 1994, William S. White of the Mott Foundation announced the offer of $40M to help UM-Flint acquire the AutoWorld property north of the river. In December 1995, the Regents accepted the gift of AutoWorld property (25 acres) from the Flint Downtown Development Authority on the mutually agreed condition that the property is cleared of all buildings and that environmental assessment and remediation is completed. In February 1997 AutoWorld is imploded and cleared to make room for the William S. White building. In 2001, UM-Flint expanded north for the first time with the opening of the William S. White Building which houses health classrooms and labs. Today, the modern and inviting campus spans over 70 acres along the Flint River.

Ground was broken In 2024 on phase one of a new Innovation and Technology Complex. Featuring 14,000 sq. ft. of state-of-the-art instructional laboratories designed to encourage collaboration and interdisciplinary research, the complex will support existing STEM pathways and forthcoming academic degrees in artificial intelligence, smart manufacturing, human-centered design, and electrical & computer engineering, among others.

As a community partner, the university has, over time, acquired existing buildings throughout the downtown area and turned them into viable parts of the campus. These spaces include the University Pavilion, the Northbank Center, and The Riverfront Conference Center.

Today, five major academic units, consisting of the College of Arts & Sciences, the School of Management, the College of Health Sciences, the School of Nursing, and the College of Innovation & Technology are housed within the university.

== Campus ==
University Pavilion
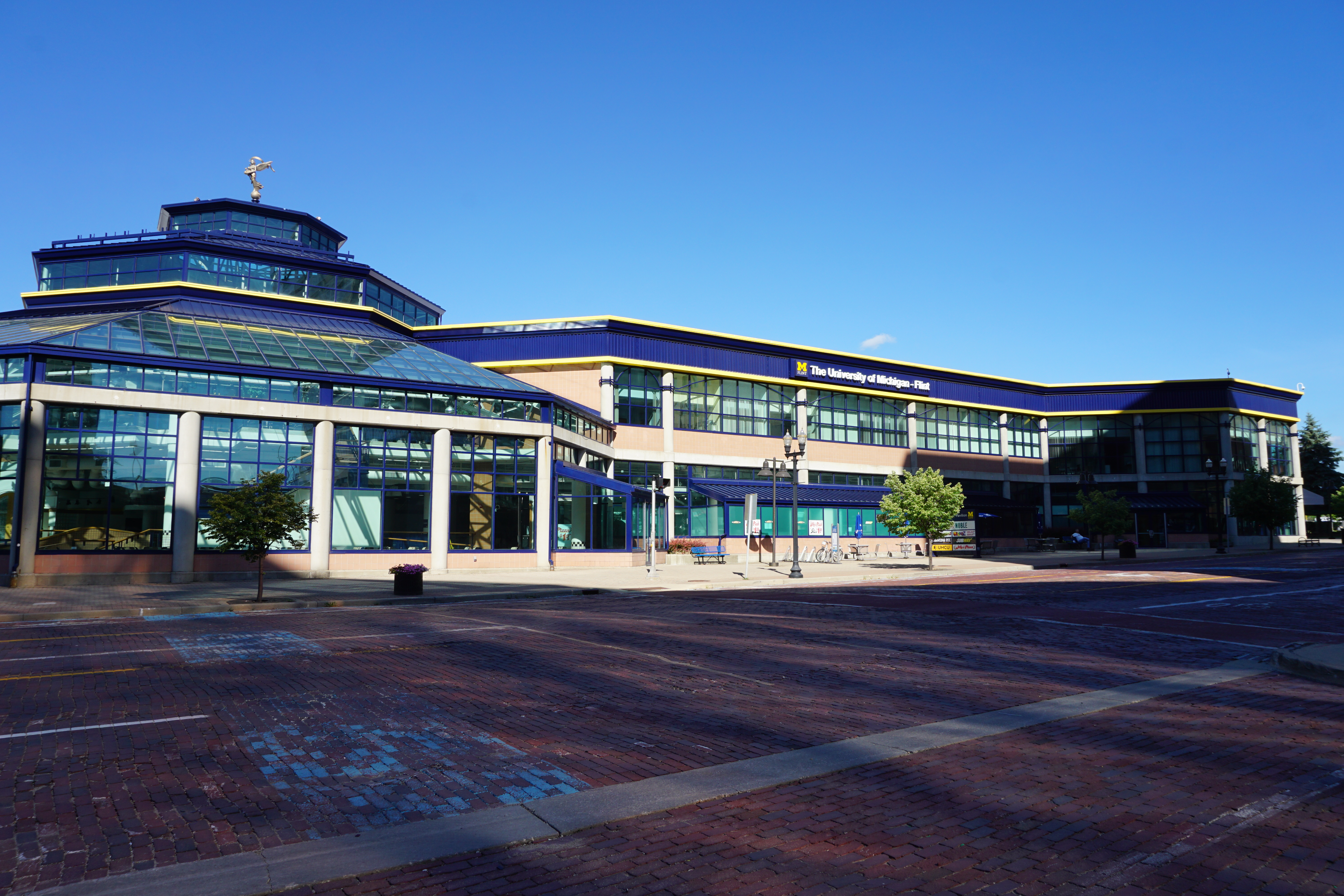
- Exterior view at sunset (July 2018)
- Former names: Water Street Pavilion (1985–1990)

General information
- Status: Operational (defunct as a festival marketplace)
- Type: Festival marketplace (1985–1990); Mixed-use (early 1990s–present)
- Location: Flint, Michigan, United States, 303 Saginaw Street, 48502
- Completed: 1985
- Opened: June 27, 1985; 41 years ago (as Water Street Pavilion); After June 1993; about 30 years ago (as University Pavilion)
- Renovated: March 1991; June 2015; September 2018
- Closed: September 1990; 36 years ago (converted into University Pavilion)
- Owner: University of Michigan-Flint
- Operator: University of Michigan–Flint

Technical details
- Floor count: 2
- Floor area: 100,000 square feet (9,300 m^{2})

Design and construction
- Architect: Mort Hoppenfeld
- Developer: James W. Rouse and the Enterprise Development Co.

Renovating team
- Renovating firm: UM-Flint
- Main contractor: Elgin Builders, Inc.; Niles Construction; Bennings Painting

Other information
- Number of stores: 60+ (at peak)

The University Pavilion (UPAV) at University of Michigan-Flint is a two-story building with retail shops and book store on the first floor, and administrative offices and key student services on the second floor, including Admissions, Financial Aid, and Academic Advising.

The building was formerly known as the Water Street Pavilion, a festival marketplace in Flint, Michigan, that failed and closed after only five years in operation. It was developed by the Enterprise Development Company (EDC), a for-profit subsidiary of the non-profit Enterprise Foundation, founded by James W. Rouse in 1982 after he retired from the Rouse Company as CEO in 1979. The EDC was founded specifically to bring Rouse's festival marketplace concept to smaller cities, including Flint. The Water Street Pavilion was intended to revitalize Flint, and it was licensed and consulted by the Columbia, Maryland-based Rouse Company.

The mall cost $15.75 million to develop, and featured 100,000 square feet (9,300 m^{2}) of retail and dining space, adjacent to the Flint River. Despite the name Water Street Pavilion, it is not on Water Street, but rather is named after it. Its name is also a reference to the Harborplace pavilions in Baltimore with similar names, specifically the Pratt and Light Street Pavilions. It once housed over 60 local tenants, but the majority of them closed in the late 1980s, alongside the failing Six Flags AutoWorld. It was famously featured in Michael Moore's Roger & Me in 1989 as a symbol of failed development, as it was an attempt to bring a specialized retail genre that required massive tourism to survive long-term, which Flint did not have at the time of the Water Street Pavilion's development. As a result of the mall's failure, James Rouse and the EDC pulled out of the project in January 1990 and began closing down the center. The pavilion permanently closed its doors as a festival marketplace in September 1990. The University of Michigan Board of Regents approved a plan to take over operations.

In 1991, UM-Flint took possession of the Water Street Pavilion, keeping restaurants there while moving in administrative offices. The Flint Downtown Development Authority officially sold the property to UM-Flint for $60,000. The university subsequently invested $3 million to fully renovate and adapt the building into University Pavilion. The library moved to its own building in 1994, with the completion of the Frances Willson Thompson Library. The 25-acre (10 ha) site across the river on the north side was acquired in 1997. Northbank Center was acquired in 1998.

Starting on June 2, 2015, UM–Flint initiated a "Going Blue" renovation on University Pavilion by new chancellor Susan E. Borrego, who made a cake replica of the building. The campaign involved painting the entire steel structure, the adjacent outdoor ice rink, the rink annex, and the connected parking garage in the university's signature colors, Maize and Blue, stripping away the original teal-and-white color scheme Rouse used. Massive, official "University of Michigan-Flint" signs were mounted on the exterior facing Kearsley Street to make the building instantly recognizable to visitors, and the iconic downtown corner clock tower at Kearsley and Saginaw Streets was completely refurbished and updated to match the new campus aesthetic by local firms Niles Construction and Bennings Painting. The renovation was done to celebrate the building's 30th anniversary, with UM–Flint pointing out that they "took a lemon off the hands of the city, and made lemonade for downtown."

While University Pavilion is no longer a festival marketplace, some of its businesses as of February 2019 include Barnes & Noble University Bookstore, Subway, Jilly's Pizza, Sportlite Grill, Shawarma Bite, and O'Blendz. The University Pavilion was renovated in September 2018, which involved removing the escalators due to costly maintenance, and it creates more open space for the dining area. The roof of the pavilion has also been refurbished to add new walking paths for workers and others in the area. Signs were also added to navigate people to the stairwells.

== Organization ==
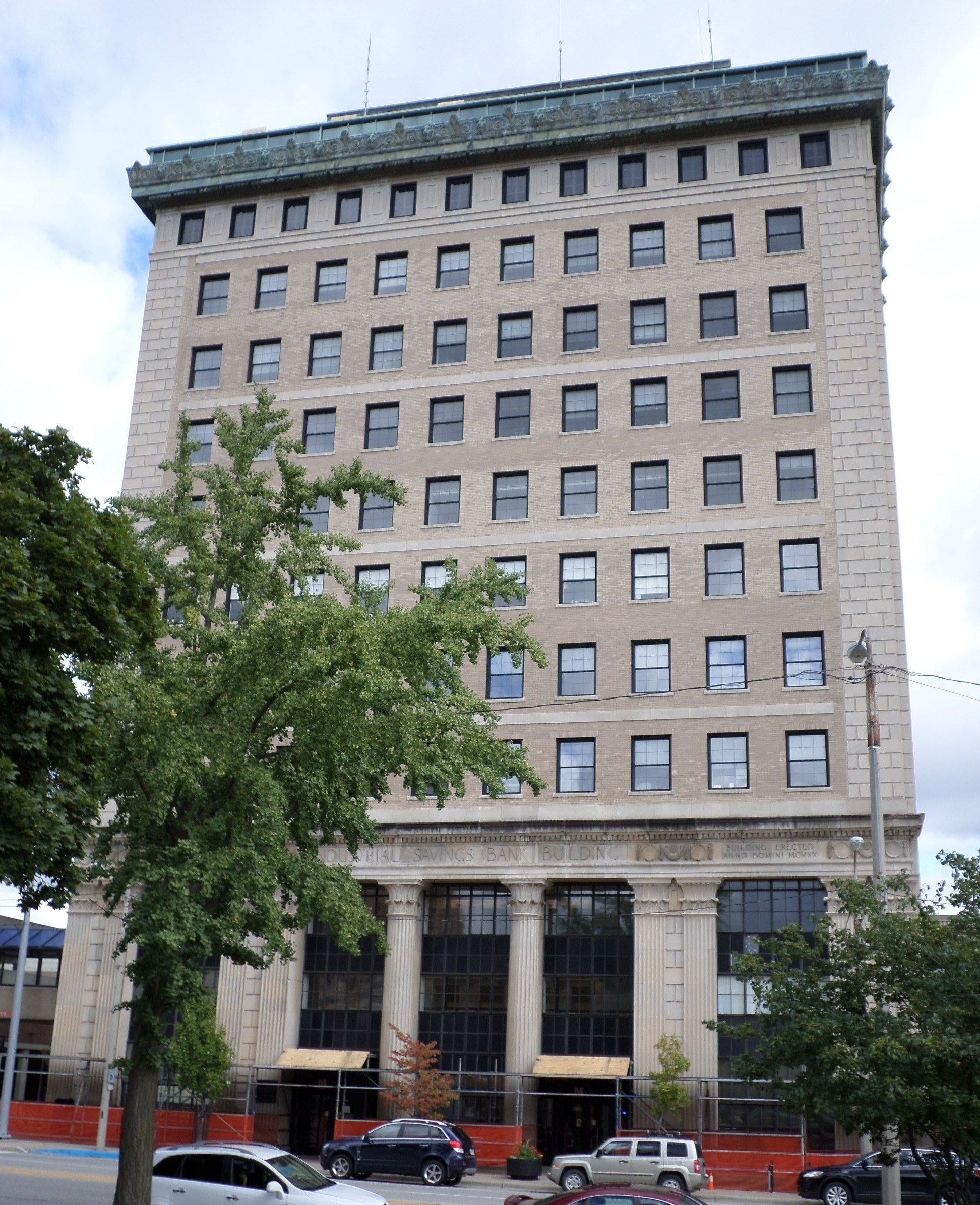
Northbank Center of University of Michigan–Flint located at 432 North Saginaw Street

=== Administration ===
UM–Flint, historically a branch of the University of Michigan, has operated under the policies of the Board of Regents of the University of Michigan since its accreditation in 1970. The Board of Regents, as the governing body, is responsible for the appointment of the university president, who presides over the Board's meetings but does not have voting rights. Instead of directly managing the university's operations, the university president recommends the appointment of a chancellor, who is subject to approval by the Board of Regents and is tasked with overseeing the day-to-day administrative duties of the university as its chief executive officer.

In contrast to the dean of the Flint College, who reported to the Ann Arbor vice president for academic affairs, the chancellor of UM-Flint reports to the president and is in charge of a campus, not a college.

==== List of chancellors ====
- William E. Moran, 1971 - 1979
  - William Vasse, 1979 - 1980 (interim)
- Conny E. Nelson, 1980 - 1983
  - Joe Roberson, 1983 - 1984 (interim)
- Clinton B. Jones, 1984 - 1993
  - Lawrence Kugler, 1993 - 1994 (interim)
- Charlie Nelms, 1994 - 1997
  - Beverly Schmoll, 1998 - 1999 (interim)
- Juan E. Mestas, 1999 - 2007
  - Jack Kay, 2007 - 2008 (interim)
- Ruth Person, 2008 - 2014
- Susan E. Borrego, 2014 - 2019
- Debasish Dutta, 2019 - 2023
  - Donna Fry, 2023 - 2024 (interim)
- Laurence B. Alexander, 2024 - present

==== Faculty governance ====
The UM-Flint faculty governance is part of a central faculty governance which provides the structure for shared governance at the University of Michigan. Through its three bodies: Senate Advisory Committee on University Affairs (SACUA), Senate Assembly and Faculty Senate, faculty are represented and contribute to a collective voice concerning institutional policies and other matters of campus, and universitywide, concern. UM-Flint has four representatives to the Senate Assembly, which has 77 members representing all U-M campuses.

=== Finances ===
The university's FY 2022–23 operating budget of $141.7 million has four major sources of funding: the General Fund ($116.5 million), the Expendable Restricted Funds ($20.7 million), the Auxiliary Funds ($4 million), and the Designated Funds ($480,000). The Office of Budget and Planning reports that student tuition and fees are the largest funding source, contributing $90.8 million to the General Fund, which accounts for 64.07% of the total operating budget. In the fiscal year 2022–23, the State of Michigan provided $25.2 million to the university, which represents 17.79% of its total operating budget. Revenue from government sponsored programs contributed $14.5 million to the Expendable Restricted Funds, accounting for 10.23% of the total operating budget.

=== Schools and colleges ===
The university's schools and colleges include the College of Arts, Sciences and Education (CASE), College of Health Sciences (CHS), College of Innovation and Technology (CIT), School of Management (SOM) and School of Nursing (SON).

College/school	Year founded	Enrollment (Fall 2025)
College of Arts, Sciences and Education	1955	2,198
College of Health Sciences	1982	1,233
College of Innovation and Technology	2021	1,056
School of Management	1975	1,336
School of Nursing	2016	1,301
TOTAL ENROLLMENT	–	7,124

== Academics ==
Programs

The university offers 183 areas of study, including 43 graduate programs in the form of master’s, doctoral and PhD offerings. There are also 23 joint bachelor’s and graduate degree options and 15 dual graduate degrees. A variety of fully online degrees are also available, including 15 bachelor’s and 20 master’s degrees, three doctoral degree programs, and four completion programs.

Popular undergraduate programs include nursing, psychology, social work, business administration and health sciences. On the graduate side, nursing, doctor of physical therapy, master of business administration, doctor of nurse anesthesia, and doctor of business administration are leaders in student interest and enrollment.

Accreditation

UM-Flint is accredited by the Higher Learning Commission (HLC) of Colleges and Schools. Program-level accreditation is maintained by many programs in affiliation with: the Accreditation Board for Engineering and Technology, the American Chemical Society, Association for the Accreditation of Human Research Protection Programs, the Association to Advance Collegiate School of Business – International, Association of University Programs in Health Administration, the Commission on Accreditation in Physical Therapy Education, Commission on Accreditation in Respiratory Care, the Commission of Collegiate Nursing Education, the Council for Accreditation of Teacher Education, the Council on Accreditation for Nurse Anesthesia Educational Programs, the Council on Social Work Education, the Joint Review Committee on Education in Radiologic Technology, Michigan Department of Education, the National Association for the Education of Young Children and the National Association of Schools of Music.

=== Employment outcomes ===
According to the U.S. Department of Education's College Scorecard, graduates of the University of Michigan-Flint have median earnings of $65,600. The College Scorecard also reports median earnings by field of study, with graduate programs in nursing and business and undergraduate programs in computer science, nursing and engineering among the university's highest-earning disciplines.

== Student life ==
=== On-campus housing ===
In November 2004, the Board of Regents of the University of Michigan approved the request of the Flint Campus to explore the feasibility of student housing. After several assessments, studies, and surveys showing the probable progression of growth of the campus, student housing was approved. The first-ever student dormitory, the First Street Residence Hall, opened to students in fall 2008.

In December 2015, Uptown Reinvestment Corporation donated the Riverfront Residence Hall, a privately owned high-rise building that houses both UM-Flint and Baker College students, to the university. The 16-story Residence Hall can house up to 500 students.

=== Student organizations ===
There are over 100 recognized student organizations and seven Sponsored Student Organizations (SSOs). They are organizations for various academic departments, religions and cultural backgrounds, as well as organizations for honors, club sports, social fraternities and sororities, service groups, and special interests.

University sponsored organizations include:

- Black Student Union
- Campus Activities Board
- College Panhellenic Association
- Interfraternity Council
- National Pan-Hellenic Council
- Student Government
- Club Sports

=== Greek life ===
The university is home to several fraternities and sororities:

Sororities:

- Sigma Gamma Rho
- Zeta Phi Beta
- Phi Sigma Sigma
- Theta Phi Alpha

Fraternities:

- Kappa Alpha Psi
- Phi Beta Sigma
- Alpha Sigma Phi
- Kappa Sigma
- Theta Chi

=== Radio station ===
The school owns WFUM (91.1 FM), a public radio station affiliated with the Michigan Radio network.

=== Student newspaper ===
The Michigan Times is a student-run campus newspaper at the University of Michigan–Flint, founded in 1959 and casually called "The M-Times" on campus. Notable former staff includes filmmaker Michael Moore and American Idol finalist LaKisha Jones. For most of its history, it was published weekly and distributed free of charge on campus and in the Flint area. In March 2024 it was announced that The Michigan Times was "sunsetting" and would cease operations due to dwindling student interest. After a call to revive the paper, the university formed an exploratory committee to find sustainable ways to bring it back. In January 2026, the paper resumed operations and experienced renewed student and community engagement. In spring 2026, it published its first print edition since its closure and, for the first time, partnered with The Michigan Daily and The Michigan Journal to help produce the first-ever tri-campus edition.

Under the new model, The Michigan Times no longer functions as a Sponsored Student Organization (SSO) but is now part of the College of Arts, Science and Education, within the Language & Communications department.

The Qua Literary & Fine Arts Magazine is the student-run literary and arts publication at the University of Michigan-Flint. It accepts submissions in fiction, poetry, creative nonfiction, and visual arts each semester, compiling them into a magazine distributed on campus and in the community. It is also housed within the Language & Communications department.

=== Student government ===
The University of Michigan–Flint Student Government represents the students and manages student funds on the campus. Student Government is a member of the statewide Association of Michigan Universities.

== Athletics ==
The University of Michigan-Flint currently offers eight club sports. Club sports are university-sponsored, student-run organizations that compete against other colleges and universities in various state, regional, and national contests.

Club sports include:

- Men's & Women's Soccer
- Men's Basketball
- Women's Volleyball
- Baseball
- Men's Ice Hockey
- Golf
- Tennis

UM-Flint’s men’s club hockey was promoted to ACHA Division I and joined the Great Lakes Collegiate Hockey League for the 2025-26 season. In 2026-2027, they will compete in ACHA Division I and Division III and will have its largest recruiting class in program history.

UM-Flint esports program recently expanded to 15 teams, competing across 11 games and leagues. In 2025-2026, esports had a record five teams compete in national championship finals.

The University of Michigan-Flint is currently pursuing the launch of intercollegiate athletics at the NAIA level, competing in the Wolverine Hoosier Athletic Conference.

== Notable faculty and alumni ==
- Jim Ananich – Michigan Senate minority leader
- Deborah Cherry – former Michigan state senator
- John D. Cherry – 62nd lieutenant governor of Michigan
- Bobby Crim – former Michigan Speaker of the House and state representative and founder of the Crim Festival of Races
- Christopher Paul Curtis (2000) – writer and Newbery Medal winner
- Erin Darke – actress
- Mona Haydar – rapper, poet, activist and chaplain
- LaKisha Jones – singer, American Idol contestant
- Michael Moore – documentary film director, author
- Don Riegle (1960) – United States Senator from Michigan
- Marietta S. Robinson – former commissioner of the U.S. Consumer Product Safety Commission
- John Sinclair (1964) – poet, political activist
- Tim Sneller – member of the Michigan House of Representatives from the 50th district
- Woodrow Stanley – former Michigan state representative, Mayor of Flint
- Phil Phelps - former Michigan state representative
- Rob Paulsen - voice-over artist
