= List of Michigan State Historic Sites in Shiawassee County =

Location of Shiawassee County in Michigan

The following is a list of Michigan State Historic Sites in Shiawassee County, Michigan. Sites marked with a dagger (†) are also listed on the National Register of Historic Places in Shiawassee County, Michigan.

== Current listings ==
Name	Image	Location	City	Listing date
Byron Cemetery		306 Hamilton, Byron, MI 48418	Burns Township	February 29, 1996
Byron Informational Designation		312 West Maple Street	Byron	July 26, 1974
Charles H. Calkins House†		127 East First Street	Perry	February 7, 1977
Capitol Theatre		122 East Main Street	Owosso	December 5, 1986
Frederick Chavannes House		12454 M-52	Perry	December 5, 1996
Coal Creek Vein Informational Site		M-21, east of State Road near Michigan Brick Company	Corunna vicinity	October 23, 1987
Elias Comstock Cabin†		Curwood Castle Drive and John Street	Owosso	January 18, 1980
Congregational Church of Perry		130 East Second Street	Perry	February 10, 1983
Corunna Public Schools / Shiawassee Street School		106 South Shiawassee Street	Corunna	April 25, 1988
Curwood Castle†		224 John Street	Owosso	April 24, 1970
Thomas E. Dewey Boyhood Home		421 West Oliver	Owosso	December 10, 1971
Birthplace of Thomas Edmund Dewey (Demolished)		313 West Main Street	Owosso	February 11, 1972
First Congregational Church and Society		327 North Washington Street	Owosso	January 17, 1991
First Congregational Church		401 East Grand River Road	Laingsburg	March 15, 1990
First National Bank of Corunna		201 North Shiawassee Street	Corunna	April 29, 1982
Herman C. Frieseke House† / Frederick Carl Frieseke Informational Designation		654 North Water Street	Owosso	June 10, 1987
Julius Frieseke House†		529 Corunna Avenue	Owosso	April 23, 1985
Durand Union Station†		200 Railroad Street	Durand	November 6, 1970
John N. Ingersoll House†		570 West Corunna Avenue	Corunna	February 11, 1972
Judd's Corners Informational Designation		9000 Juddville Road, SE corner of Durand Road	Corunna	June 15, 1992
Knaggs Bridge Area Informational Site (marker stolen)		Cole Road at the Shiawassee River, 3 miles southeast of Bancroft	Bancroft	April 11, 1963
Knights Templar Special Informational Designation		Iron Horse Park, 205 West Clinton Street	Durand	May 8, 1986
Maple River Area		540-1151 East Bennington and 5210 Colby Road	Owosso vicinity	April 4, 1978
Martin Road Bridge†		Martin Road at the Shiawassee River	Caledonia Township	June 21, 1990
Hugh McCurdy / Hugh McCurdy Park Informational Site		West Corunna Avenue at Governor Parsons Drive	Corunna	March 15, 1990
Methodist Episcopal Church		101 South Beach Street	Bancroft	April 21, 1980
Methodist Episcopal Church (Burned)		7495 Orchard	New Lothrop	September 7, 1989
Governor Andrew Parsons House		318 McNeil Street	Corunna	June 27, 1969
Old Perry Centre Informational Designation		M-52 at the junction of Ellsworth Road	Perry	March 19, 1987
Perry District No. 4 School		Roselawn Cemetery, 1864 West Ellsworth Road	Perry	January 23, 1992
Saint Mary's Church		509 Main Street	Morrice	September 24, 1992
Saint Michael Church	St. Michael Church-New Lothrop	17994 Lincoln Rd.	New Lothrop	May 10, 1987
Shiawassee Conservation Association Clubhouse		4247 North M-52	Owosso	September 26, 1987
Shiawassee County Courthouse†		218 N Shiawassee Avenue (M-71)	Corunna	November 14, 1974
South Side School		405 South Oak Street	Durand	July 26, 1978
Ellen May Tower Informational Designation		312 West Maple Street	Byron	January 19, 1989
Andrew J. Van Riper House		7480 West Beard Road	Perry vicinity	January 22, 1987

== See also ==
- National Register of Historic Places listings in Shiawassee County, Michigan

== Sources ==
- Historic Sites Online – Shiawassee County. Michigan State Housing Developmental Authority. Accessed June 3, 2011.
