= Middletown, Michigan =

- Census-designated place (CDP) & unincorporated community
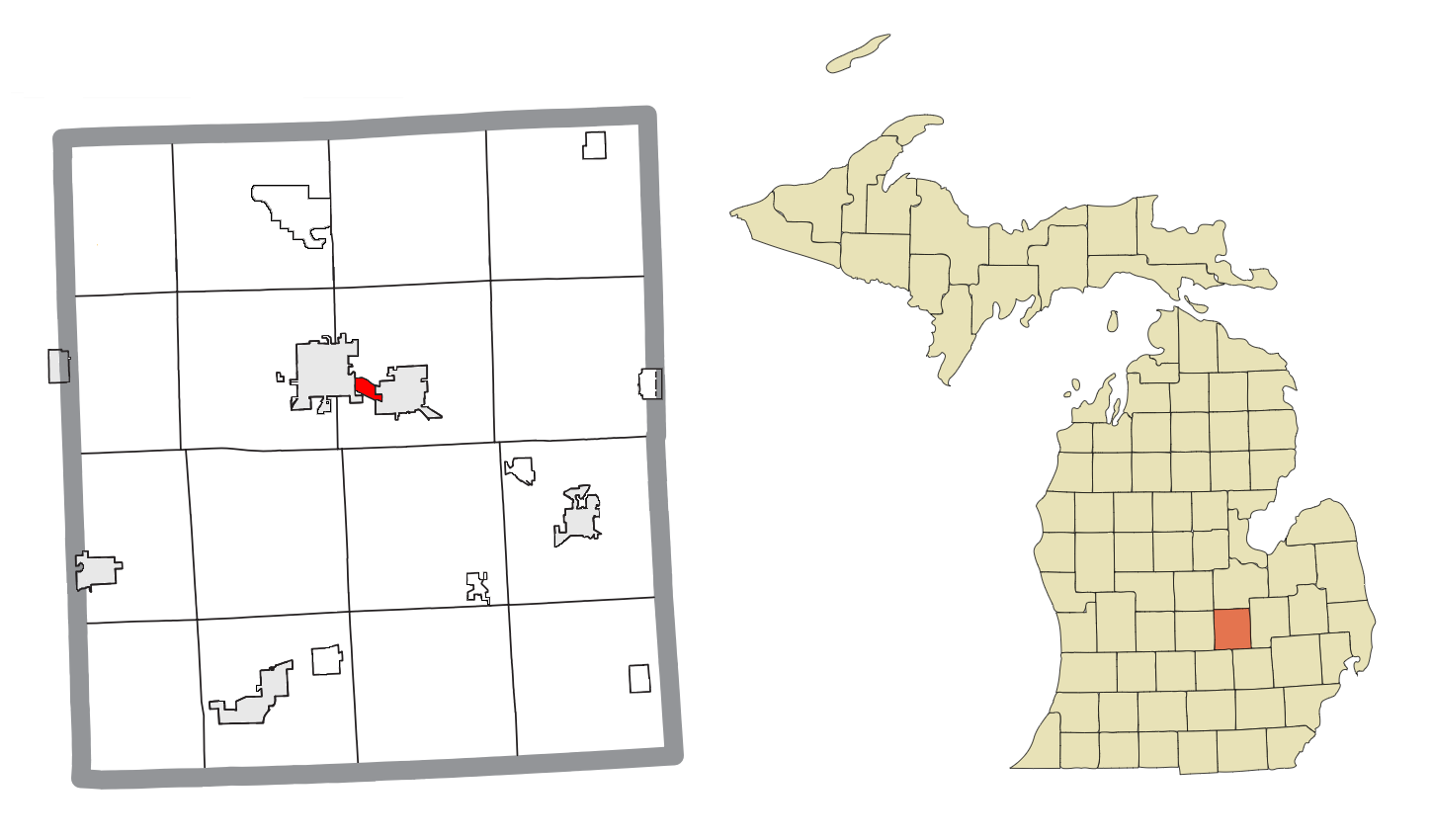
- Location within Shiawassee County

- Location within the state of Michigan Middletown (the United States)
- Coordinates: 42°59′12″N 84°08′40″W
- Country: United States
- State: Michigan
- County: Shiawassee
- Township: Caledonia

Area
  - Total: 0.48 sq mi (1.24 km^{2})
  - Land: 0.47 sq mi (1.22 km^{2})
  - Water: 0.012 sq mi (0.03 km^{2})
- Elevation: 742 ft (226 m)

Population (2020)
  - Total: 825
  - Density: 1,757.8/sq mi (678.68/km^{2})
- Time zone: UTC-5 (Eastern (EST))
  - Summer (DST): UTC-4 (EDT)
- ZIP code(s): 48867 (Owosso)
- Area code: 989
- FIPS code: 26-53730
- GNIS feature ID: 2393130

Middletown is a census-designated place (CDP) in Shiawassee County in the U.S. state of Michigan. Middletown is located within Caledonia Township along M-71 between the cities of Corunna and Owosso. The CDP had a population of 825 at the 2020 census.

== Geography ==
According to the United States Census Bureau, the CDP has a total area of 0.48 square miles (1.24 km^{2}), of which 0.47 square miles (1.22 km^{2}) is land and 0.01 square miles (0.03 km^{2}) (2.08%) is water.

The Shiawassee River flows just north of Middletown.

== Demographics ==
Historical population
Census	Pop.	Note	%±
2010	897		—
2020	825		−8.0%
U.S. Decennial Census

As of the census of 2000, there were 966 people, 374 households, and 264 families residing in the CDP. The population density was 1,973.3 inhabitants per square mile (761.9/km^{2}). There were 396 housing units at an average density of 808.9 per square mile (312.3/km^{2}). The racial makeup of the CDP was 97.52% White, 0.31% African American, 0.52% Native American, 0.21% Asian, 0.83% from other races, and 0.62% from two or more races. Hispanic or Latino of any race were 1.97% of the population.

There were 374 households, out of which 32.9% had children under the age of 18 living with them, 56.7% were married couples living together, 10.7% had a female householder with no husband present, and 29.4% were non-families. 22.5% of all households were made up of individuals, and 8.0% had someone living alone who was 65 years of age or older. The average household size was 2.58 and the average family size was 3.02.

In the CDP, the population was spread out, with 26.1% under the age of 18, 7.1% from 18 to 24, 34.0% from 25 to 44, 21.1% from 45 to 64, and 11.7% who were 65 years of age or older. The median age was 36 years. For every 100 females, there were 105.5 males. For every 100 females age 18 and over, there were 100.0 males.

The median income for a household in the CDP was $32,891, and the median income for a family was $44,792. Males had a median income of $34,125 versus $22,639 for females. The per capita income for the CDP was $16,500. About 8.3% of families and 7.7% of the population were below the poverty line, including 7.4% of those under age 18 and none of those age 65 or over.

== Transportation ==
=== Major highway ===
- M-71

=== Airport ===
- Owosso Community Airport is located just north in Caledonia Township.
