= Owosso Township, Michigan =

- Charter township
- Owosso Charter Township
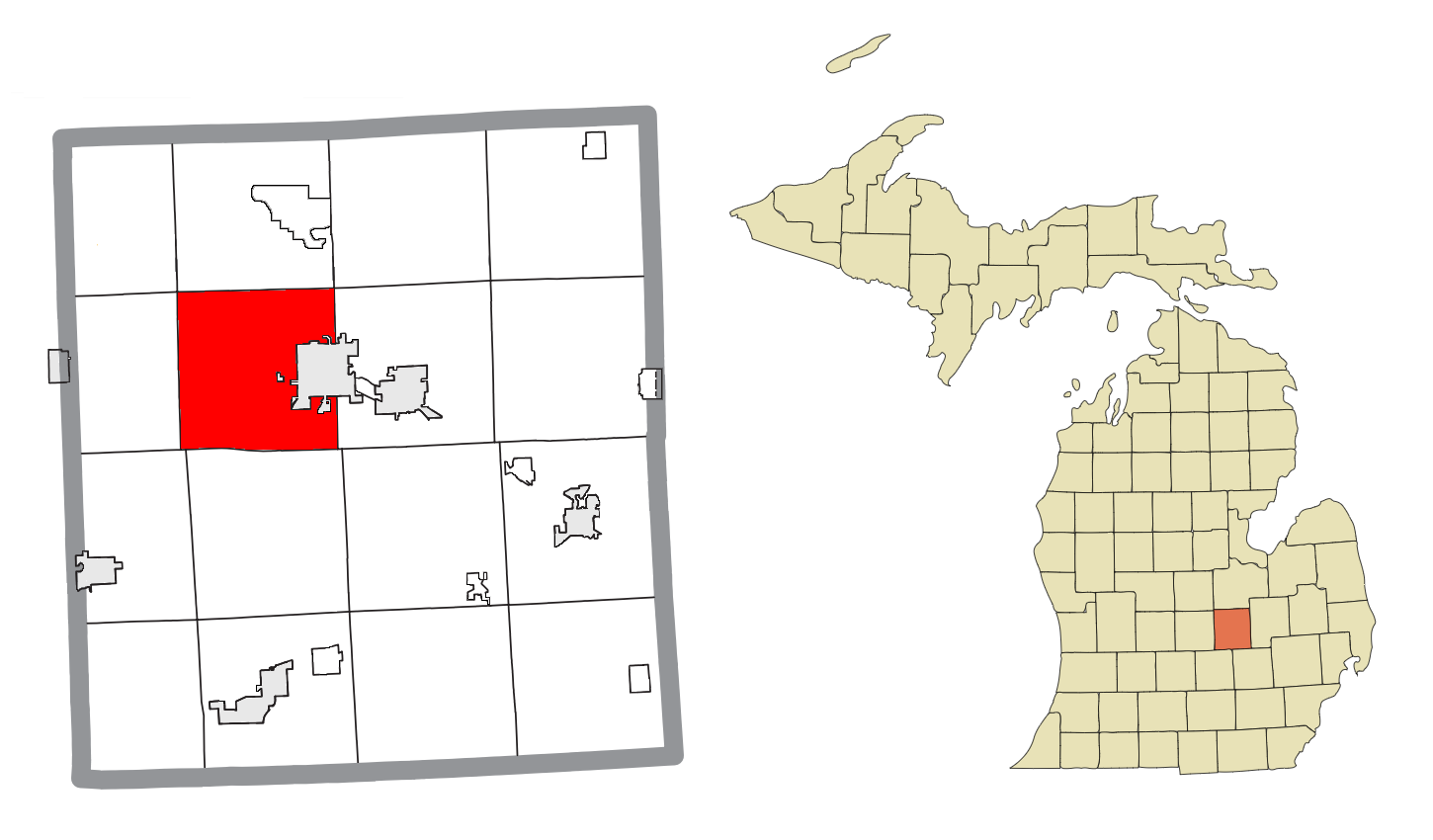
- Location within Shiawassee County

- Location within the state of Michigan
- Coordinates: 42°59′51″N 84°12′38″W
- Country: United States
- State: Michigan
- County: Shiawassee
- Organized: 1837

Government
  - Supervisor: Steve Schweikert
  - Clerk: Pat Skvarenina
  - Treasurer: June Cudney

Area
  - Total: 32.15 sq mi (83.3 km^{2})
  - Land: 31.61 sq mi (81.9 km^{2})
  - Water: 0.74 sq mi (1.9 km^{2})
- Elevation: 768 ft (234 m)

Population (2020)
  - Total: 4,765
  - Density: 150.7/sq mi (58.20/km^{2})
- Time zone: UTC-5 (Eastern (EST))
  - Summer (DST): UTC-4 (EDT)
- ZIP code(s): 48866 (Ovid); 48867 (Owosso)
- Area code: 989
- FIPS code: 26-61960
- GNIS feature ID: 1626876
- Website: Official website

Owosso Township, formally named Owosso Charter Township, is a charter township of Shiawassee County in the U.S. state of Michigan. The population was 4,765 at the 2020 census. The township borders the city of Owosso on the east, but the two are administered autonomously.

== Communities ==
- Burton is an unincorporated community along S. Baldwin Road, which separated Owosso Township from adjacent Middlebury Township, at McBride Road. It was first established under the name Mungerville in 1864 but renamed to Burton on May 3, 1878. On January 31, 1936, the post office was closed. It is at 43°00′28″N 84°17′05″W, about 4.5 miles west of the city of Owosso.
- Five Points, also referred to as Five Points West or West Five Points, is an unincorporated community in the township at M-21, Priest Road and Smith Road. 42°59′52″N 84°13′33″W
- Smith Crossing is an unincorporated community in the township at Wilkinson and Smith roads near the Great Lakes Central Railroad crossing. 43°01′35″N 84°13′23″W

== History ==
In 1835, the township received its first non-Native settlers, Elias Comstock, Kilburn Bedell and Lewis Findley, Bedell's father-in-law. The first building at Big Rapids was built in 1836. The township's name sake is the American Indian Chief Wasso. Wasso and his tribe was moved from this area by the US under the 1836 treaty to a reservation. A post office was established at Big Rapids on November 4, 1838, with the name Owasso with postmaster Daniel Ball. In 1838, Big Rapids/Owasso was platted by Daniel Gould for the owners, Williams.

Shiawassee County was organized as a single township with the same name on March 23, 1836. Owosso Township was split off from Shiawassee Township taking the northern half of the county which was eight township survey areas on March 11, 1837. On March 21, 1839, Middlebury and Fairfield township areas were split off from Owosso as Middlebury Township, while the survey area 7 north range 4 east was detached from the township and added to Vernon Township. On the following day, Caledonia was detached short 5 section from the full township survey area. On February 16, 1842, the missing section were transferred to Caledonia to make it a whole survey area.

By 1844, the spelling Owosso for the community came into use. The organizational act of March 20, 1848 formed New Haven Township, consisting of New Haven and Hazelton survey areas, from the township's territory. On March 28, 1950, Rush township was created out the township's northern township survey area leaving the township with a single survey area. In 1859, Owosso was incorporated as a city.

Before January 22, 1864, the Detroit and Milwaukee Railroad came through the township's west side and a station, Mungerville, opened there. On that date, a post office opened there with the same name under postmaster Philander Munger. The Mungerville post office changed its name on May 4, 1878, to Burton. The Owasso post office officially changed to the newer spelling on June 8, 1875.

On January 31, 1936, the Burton post office was closed.

== Geography ==
According to the United States Census Bureau, the township has a total area of 32.15 square miles (83.27 km^{2}), of which 31.61 square miles (81.87 km^{2}) is land and 0.74 square miles (1.9 km^{2}) (2.30%) is water.

== Demographics ==
As of the census of 2000, there were 4,670 people, 1,816 households, and 1,334 families residing in the township. The population density was 144.3 inhabitants per square mile (55.7/km^{2}). There were 1,898 housing units at an average density of 58.6 per square mile (22.6/km^{2}). The racial makeup of the township was 97.73% White, 0.15% African American, 0.28% Native American, 0.64% Asian, 0.02% Pacific Islander, 0.34% from other races, and 0.84% from two or more races. Hispanic or Latino of any race were 1.35% of the population.

There were 1,816 households, out of which 31.3% had children under the age of 18 living with them, 62.7% were married couples living together, 7.3% had a female householder with no husband present, and 26.5% were non-families. 22.9% of all households were made up of individuals, and 11.9% had someone living alone who was 65 years of age or older. The average household size was 2.56 and the average family size was 2.99.

In the township the population was spread out, with 24.8% under the age of 18, 7.2% from 18 to 24, 25.5% from 25 to 44, 26.0% from 45 to 64, and 16.5% who were 65 years of age or older. The median age was 40 years. For every 100 females, there were 98.7 males. For every 100 females age 18 and over, there were 94.3 males.

The median income for a household in the township was $41,500, and the median income for a family was $46,863. Males had a median income of $40,778 versus $21,560 for females. The per capita income for the township was $19,772. About 3.1% of families and 6.7% of the population were below the poverty line, including 9.6% of those under age 18 and 10.6% of those age 65 or over.

== Transportation ==
=== Highways ===
- M-21
- M-52

=== Airport ===
- Owosso Community Airport is located just east in Caledonia Township.
