= Woodhull Township, Michigan =

- Civil township
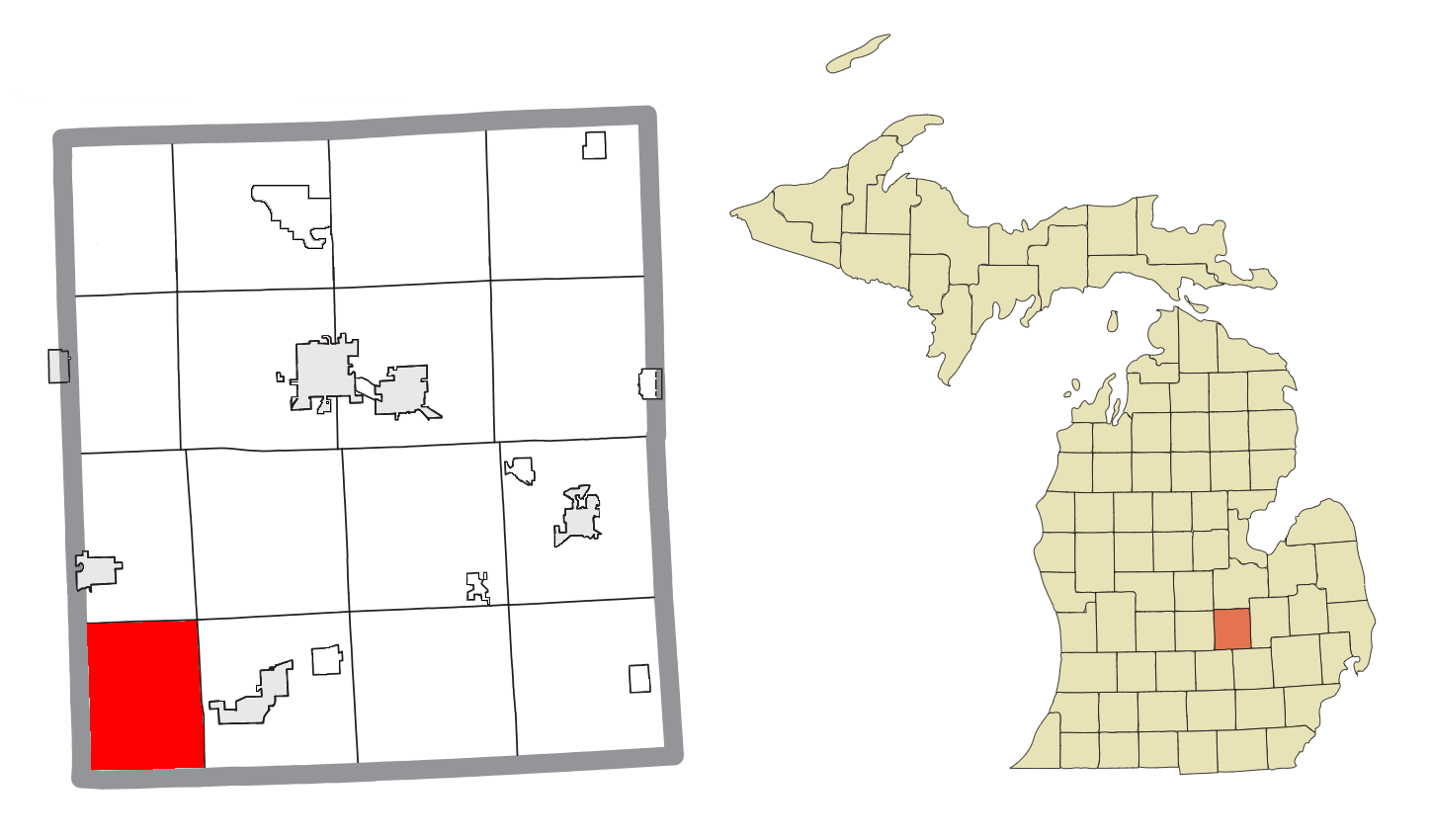
- Location within Shiawassee County

- Location within the state of Michigan Woodhull Township (the United States)
- Coordinates: 42°48′36″N 84°19′31″W
- Country: United States
- State: Michigan
- County: Shiawassee
- Established: 1838

Government
  - Supervisor: Steve Daunt
  - Clerk: Carol Maize

Area
  - Total: 27.39 sq mi (70.9 km^{2})
  - Land: 25.52 sq mi (66.1 km^{2})
  - Water: 1.87 sq mi (4.8 km^{2})
- Elevation: 883 ft (269 m)

Population (2020)
  - Total: 3,687
  - Density: 144.5/sq mi (55.78/km^{2})
- Time zone: UTC-5 (Eastern (EST))
  - Summer (DST): UTC-4 (EDT)
- ZIP code(s): 48840 (Haslett); 48848 (Laingsburg); 48872 (Perry); 48882 (Shaftsburg)
- Area code: 517
- FIPS code: 26-88400
- GNIS feature ID: 1627288
- Website: Official website

Woodhull Township is a civil township of Shiawassee County in the U.S. state of Michigan. The population was 3,687 at the 2020 census.

Woodhull Township as organized in 1838.

== Communities ==
- Shaftsburg, formerly Woodhull, is an unincorporated community and census-designated place just west of Perry at Shaftsburg and Beard roads with the ZIP Code of 48882. It is located at 42°48′17″N 84°17′35″W.

== Geography ==
According to the United States Census Bureau, the township has a total area of 27.4 square miles (71 km^{2}), of which 27.1 square miles (70 km^{2}) is land and 0.3 square miles (0.78 km^{2}) (1.17%) is water.

== Demographics ==
As of the census of 2000, there were 3,850 people, 1,390 households, and 1,124 families residing in the township. The population density was 142.0 inhabitants per square mile (54.8/km^{2}). There were 1,441 housing units at an average density of 53.1 per square mile (20.5/km^{2}). The racial makeup of the township was 97.30% White, 0.26% African American, 0.65% Native American, 0.26% Asian, 0.39% from other races, and 1.14% from two or more races. Hispanic or Latino of any race were 1.12% of the population.

There were 1,390 households, out of which 37.0% had children under the age of 18 living with them, 69.9% were married couples living together, 7.6% had a female householder with no husband present, and 19.1% were non-families. 14.3% of all households were made up of individuals, and 4.6% had someone living alone who was 65 years of age or older. The average household size was 2.77 and the average family size was 3.05.

In the township the population was spread out, with 26.9% under the age of 18, 7.0% from 18 to 24, 29.8% from 25 to 44, 28.2% from 45 to 64, and 8.1% who were 65 years of age or older. The median age was 38 years. For every 100 females, there were 101.0 males. For every 100 females age 18 and over, there were 100.1 males.

The median income for a household in the township was $60,658, and the median income for a family was $67,903. Males had a median income of $50,157 versus $36,000 for females. The per capita income for the township was $27,310. About 3.8% of families and 4.6% of the population were below the poverty line, including 5.4% of those under age 18 and 2.2% of those age 65 or over.

== Highways ==
- I-69
