= Owosso =

Owosso may refer to a location in the United States:

- Owosso, Michigan, a city in Shiawassee County
- Owosso Township, Michigan, adjacent to the city
