= Fairfield Township, Michigan =

Fairfield Township is the name of some places in the U.S. state of Michigan:

- Fairfield Township, Lenawee County, Michigan
- Fairfield Township, Shiawassee County, Michigan
