= Shiawassee County Courthouse =

- U.S. National Register of Historic Places
- Michigan State Historic Site
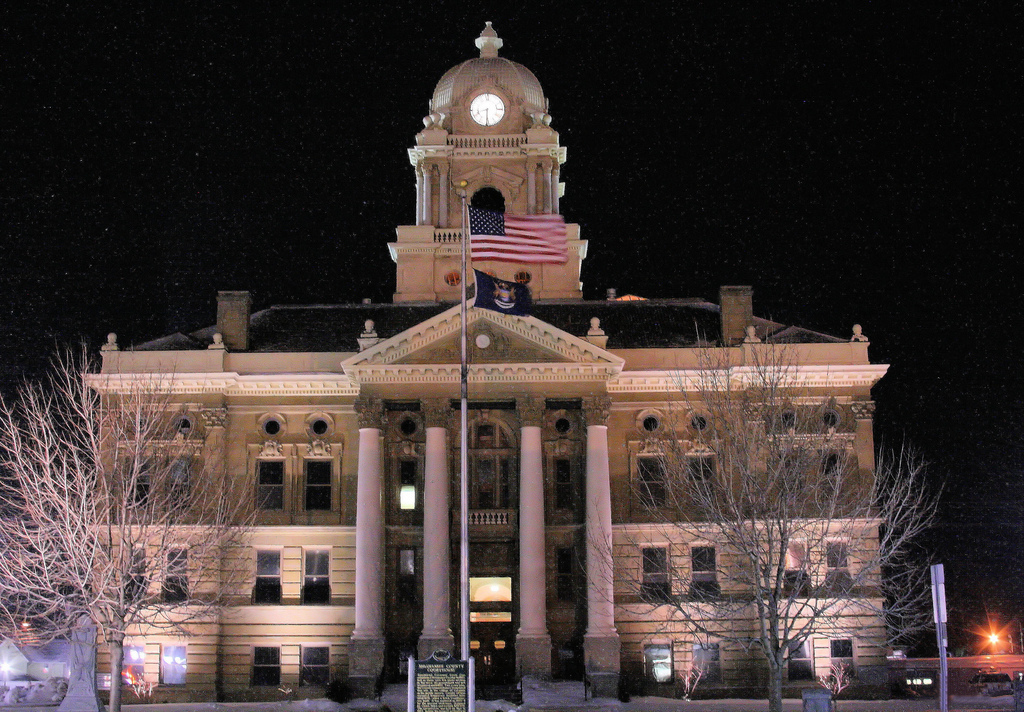
- Courthouse at night in 2009; the MSHS marker is visible at center-bottom

- Location within Michigan Location within the United States
- Interactive map showing the location of Shiawassee County Courthouse
- Location: 218 N Shiawassee Avenue, Corunna, Michigan
- Built: 1903–1904
- Architect: Claire Allen
- NRHP reference No.: 82000546

Significant dates
- Added to NRHP: November 12, 1982
- Designated MSHS: November 14, 1974

The Shiawassee County Courthouse is a historic courthouse in Corunna, the county seat of Shiawassee County, Michigan. It is a Michigan State Historic Site and is listed on the National Register of Historic Places. Built from 1903 through 1904, it was designed by Claire Allen in the Classical Revival style. The building continues its original function of housing county offices and is an active courthouse.

== History ==
Shiawassee County was established in 1822 by Lewis Cass, governor of Michigan Territory. Due to its low population, it was not until 1837 that a county government was organized. In 1839, the Shiawassee County Seat Company donated a piece of land to the county which was designated as a public square. Temporary facilities held county offices on the square until the construction of a brick courthouse in 1851. A new courthouse, designed by Claire Allen, was built from 1903 through 1904 at the square, with the cornerstone laid on May 4, 1904. The project cost $75,000.

The courthouse was designated a Michigan State Historic Site on November 14, 1974, and an informational marker was erected on December 31, 1974. The building was renovated in 1981. On November 12, 1982, it was added to the National Register of Historic Places. Further renovation work took place from 2009 through 2010, with the primary goal of increasing security. Begun in September 2009, the $424,000 project reduced the number of entrances and added metal detectors and an elevator. The work was cognizant of the building's history, keeping renovations in line with the structure's original appearance. The building continues to house most county offices and is still an active courthouse.

== Architecture ==
The building is a three-story structure built of Bedford Limestone in the Classical Revival style. The front face is visually divided into five bays. The lower two levels have a rusticated facade. In the center of the front face is a projecting portico with a column-supported pediment. The structure has a hipped roof, on top of which is an elaborately decorated three-tiered clock tower with a tile roof.

== See also ==
- National Register of Historic Places listings in Shiawassee County, Michigan
- List of Michigan State Historic Sites in Shiawassee County, Michigan
