= Shiawassee County, Michigan =

County in Michigan, United States

- County
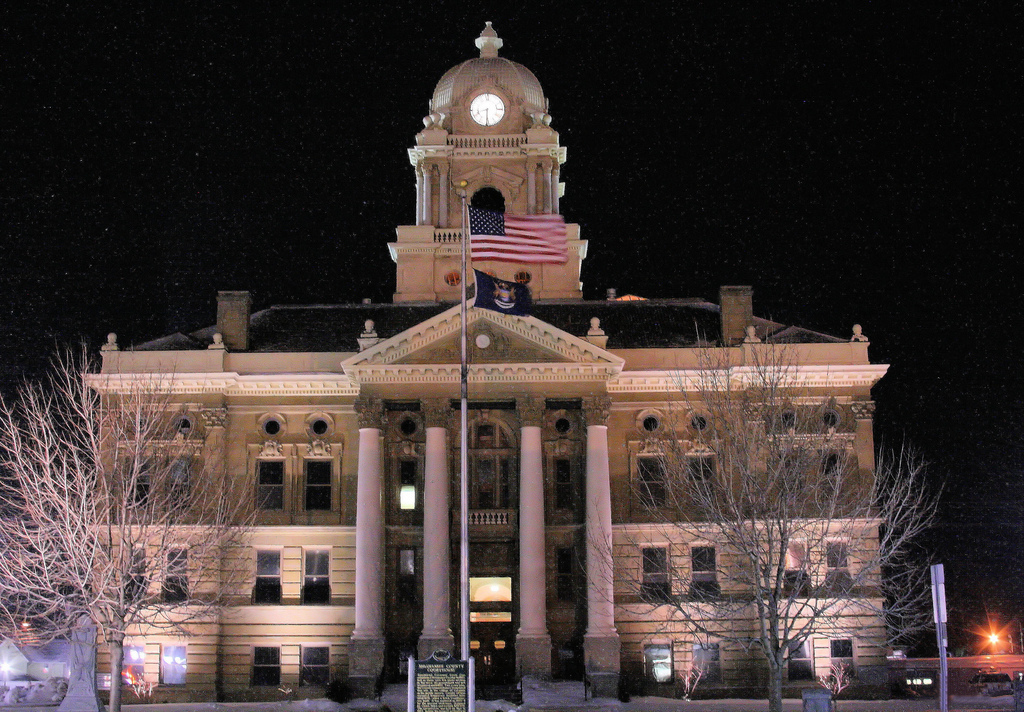
- Shiawassee County Courthouse in Corunna

- Location within the U.S. state of Michigan
- Coordinates: 42°57′N 84°08′W
- Country: United States
- State: Michigan
- Founded: September 10, 1822 (created); 1837 (organized)
- Named for: Shiawassee River
- Seat: Corunna
- Largest city: Owosso

Area
  - Total: 541 sq mi (1,400 km^{2})
  - Land: 531 sq mi (1,380 km^{2})
  - Water: 10 sq mi (26 km^{2}) 1.9%

Population (2020)
  - Total: 68,094
  - Estimate (2025): 67,681 ▼
  - Density: 128/sq mi (49.5/km^{2})
- Time zone: UTC−5 (Eastern)
  - Summer (DST): UTC−4 (EDT)
- Congressional district: 7th
- Website: shiawassee.net

Shiawassee County (/ˌʃaɪəˈwɒsi/ SHY-ə-WOSS-ee) is a county located in the U.S. state of Michigan. As of the 2020 United States census, the population was 68,094. The county seat is Corunna, and the largest city in the county is Owosso. In 2010, the center of population of Michigan was located in Shiawassee County, in Bennington Township.

Shiawassee County is included in the Lansing-East Lansing, MI Metropolitan Statistical Area.

== History ==
In 1822, the Michigan Territorial legislature defined a new county, Shiawassee (named for the Shiawassee River), taken from portions of existing Oakland and St. Clair counties. However, for purposes of representation, revenue, and judicial matters, the area was temporarily assigned to adjoining county governments. In early 1837, the Michigan Territory was admitted into the Union as the State of Michigan, and that same year the new Michigan State government authorized the organization of a county government in Shiawassee.

== Geography ==
According to the US Census Bureau, the county has a total area of 541 square miles (1,400 km^{2}), of which 531 square miles (1,380 km^{2}) is land and 10 square miles (26 km^{2}), or 1.9%, is water. The Shiawassee River enters it from Genesee County in the southeast and flows through Corunna and Owosso in the center of the county, exiting to Saginaw County in the north. Shiawassee County is considered to be a part of Central Michigan.

=== Adjacent counties ===
- Saginaw County – north
- Genesee County – east
- Livingston County – southeast
- Ingham County – southwest
- Clinton County – west
- Gratiot County – northwest

== Transportation ==
=== Highways ===
- I-69 - enters near SW corner of county. Runs ENE past Shaftsburg, Perry, Morrice, Bancroft, Durand. Exits running east into Genesee County.
- M-13 - runs along the east line of county, from NE corner to intersection with I-69 one mile (1.6 km) south of Lennon.
- M-21 - runs east–west through upper middle of county, passing Corunna and Owosso.
- M-52 - enters north line of county at Oakley. Runs south to Owosso, then SW and south to Perry. Exits running south into Ingham County.
- M-71 - begins at Owosso. Runs ESE to intersection with I-69, one mile (1.6 km) NW of Durand.

=== Rail ===
- Durand Union Station in Durand offers access to Amtrak's Blue Water route. The train runs from Port Huron to Chicago.

=== Airport ===
Owosso Community Airport – 2 miles (3.2 km) east of Owosso. Public airport for general aviation, primarily smaller aircraft.

== Demographics ==
Historical population
Census	Pop.	Note	%±
1840	2,103		—
1850	5,230		148.7%
1860	12,349		136.1%
1870	20,858		68.9%
1880	27,059		29.7%
1890	30,952		14.4%
1900	33,866		9.4%
1910	33,246		−1.8%
1920	35,924		8.1%
1930	39,517		10.0%
1940	41,207		4.3%
1950	45,967		11.6%
1960	53,446		16.3%
1970	63,075		18.0%
1980	71,140		12.8%
1990	69,770		−1.9%
2000	71,687		2.7%
2010	70,648		−1.4%
2020	68,094		−3.6%
2025 (est.)	67,681	▼	−0.6%
US Decennial Census; 1790-1960 1900-1990; 1990-2000 2010-2018

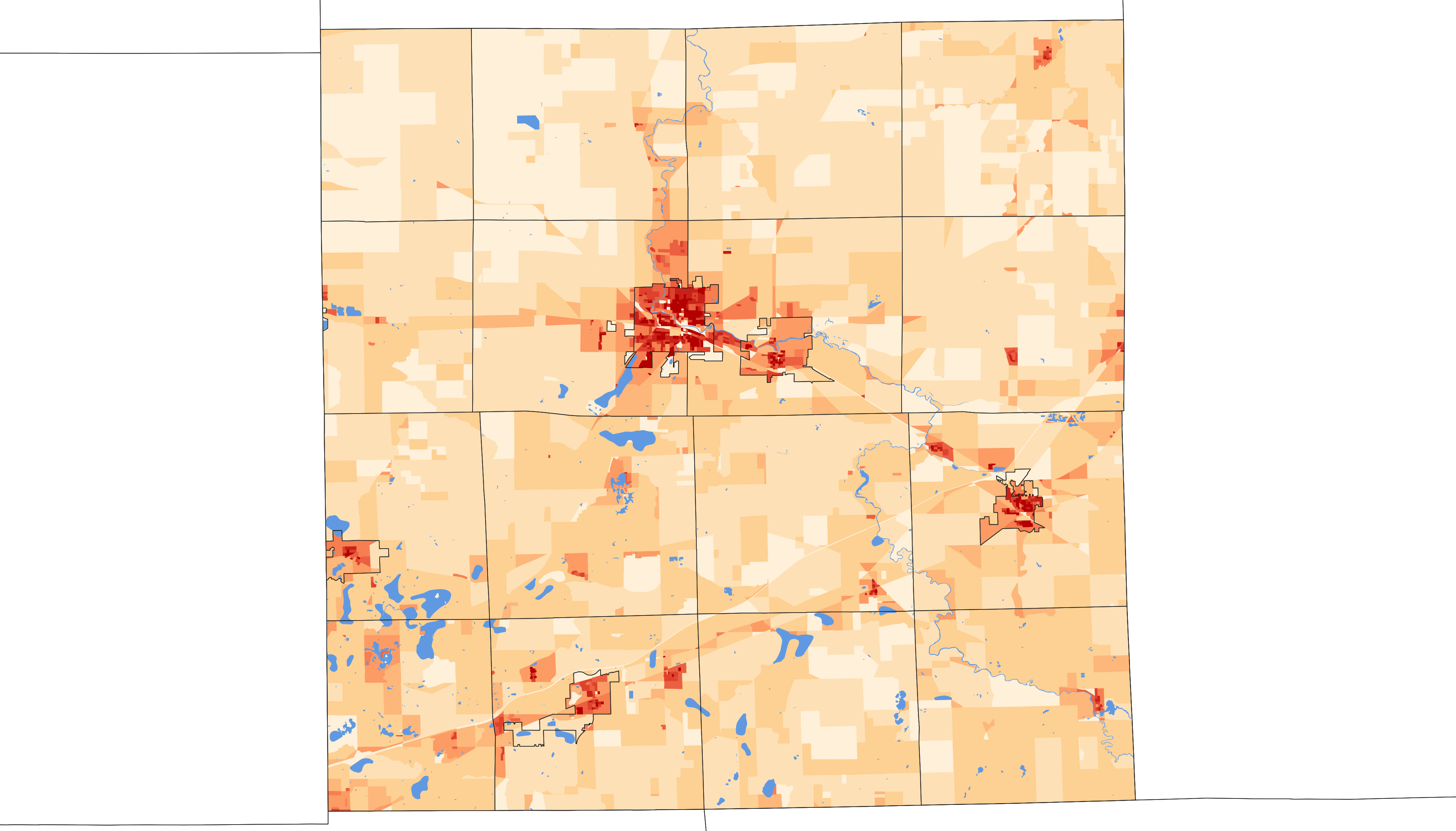
2020 population density of Shiawassee County MI by census block

=== Racial and ethnic composition ===
Shiawassee County, Michigan – Racial and ethnic composition Note: the US Census treats Hispanic/Latino as an ethnic category. This table excludes Latinos from the racial categories and assigns them to a separate category. Hispanics/Latinos may be of any race.
Race / Ethnicity (NH = Non-Hispanic)	Pop 1980	Pop 1990	Pop 2000	Pop 2010	Pop 2020	% 1980	% 1990	% 2000	% 2010	% 2020
White alone (NH)	69,738	68,041	69,016	67,240	62,239	98.03%	97.52%	96.27%	95.18%	91.40%
Black or African American alone (NH)	67	92	135	305	319	0.09%	0.13%	0.19%	0.43%	0.47%
Native American or Alaska Native alone (NH)	317	356	293	303	223	0.45%	0.51%	0.41%	0.43%	0.33%
Asian alone (NH)	148	209	199	247	288	0.21%	0.30%	0.28%	0.35%	0.42%
Native Hawaiian or Pacific Islander alone (NH)	x	x	8	22	19	x	x	0.01%	0.03%	0.03%
Other race alone (NH)	52	19	15	36	188	0.07%	0.03%	0.02%	0.05%	0.28%
Mixed race or Multiracial (NH)	x	x	726	800	2,794	x	x	1.01%	1.13%	4.10%
Hispanic or Latino (any race)	818	1,053	1,295	1,695	2,024	1.15%	1.51%	1.81%	2.40%	2.97%
Total	71,140	69,770	71,687	70,648	68,094	100.00%	100.00%	100.00%	100.00%	100.00%

=== 2020 census ===
As of the 2020 census, the county had a population of 68,094. The median age was 43.3 years. 20.9% of residents were under the age of 18 and 19.8% of residents were 65 years of age or older. For every 100 females there were 97.8 males, and for every 100 females age 18 and over there were 96.1 males age 18 and over.

The racial makeup of the county was 92.7% White, 0.5% Black or African American, 0.4% American Indian and Alaska Native, 0.4% Asian, <0.1% Native Hawaiian and Pacific Islander, 0.7% from some other race, and 5.2% from two or more races. Hispanic or Latino residents of any race comprised 3.0% of the population.

40.2% of residents lived in urban areas, while 59.8% lived in rural areas.

There were 27,889 households in the county, of which 27.4% had children under the age of 18 living in them. Of all households, 49.9% were married-couple households, 17.7% were households with a male householder and no spouse or partner present, and 24.2% were households with a female householder and no spouse or partner present. About 27.0% of all households were made up of individuals and 12.6% had someone living alone who was 65 years of age or older.

There were 30,231 housing units, of which 7.7% were vacant. Among occupied housing units, 76.9% were owner-occupied and 23.1% were renter-occupied. The homeowner vacancy rate was 1.4% and the rental vacancy rate was 6.0%.

=== 2010 census ===
As of the 2010 United States census, Shiawassee County had a 2010 population of 70,648. This decrease of -1,039 people from the 2000 United States census represents a decrease of 1.4% during that ten-year period. In 2010 there were 27,481 households and 19,397 families in the county. The population density was 133.1 per square mile (51.4 per square kilometer). There were 30,319 housing units at an average density of 57.1 per square mile (22.0/km^{2}). 96.7% of the population were White, 0.5% Native American, 0.5% Black or African American, 0.4% Asian, 0.5% of some other race and 1.5% of two or more races. 2.4% were Hispanic or Latino (of any race). 22.2% were of German, 21.8% English, 9.5% Irish, 5.2% French, French Canadian or Cajun and 5.1% Polish ancestry according to 2010 American Community Survey.

The 2010 American Community Survey 1-year estimate indicates the median income for a household in the county was $46,528 and the median income for a family was $52,614. Males had a median income of $32,155 versus $19,301 for females. The per capita income for the county was $21,103. About 10.6% of families and 15.4% of the population were below the poverty line, including 22.1% of those under the age 18 and 5.8% of those age 65 or over.

== Politics ==
Shiawassee County has tended to vote Republican since the beginning. Since 1884, the Republican Party nominee for president has carried 75% of the elections (27 of 36). Until the 2020 U.S. presidential election, the county was a U.S. presidential bellwether county, voting for the winner of the U.S. presidential election from 1980 to 2016.

United States presidential election results for Shiawassee County, Michigan
Year	Republican		Democratic		Third party(ies)	
Year	No.	%	No.	%	No.	%
1884	2,705	41.71%	3,141	48.43%	640	9.87%
1888	4,007	51.91%	3,187	41.29%	525	6.80%
1892	3,619	47.17%	2,994	39.02%	1,060	13.81%
1896	4,654	50.50%	4,303	46.69%	259	2.81%
1900	5,051	56.69%	3,441	38.62%	418	4.69%
1904	5,553	66.19%	2,241	26.71%	596	7.10%
1908	4,199	57.96%	2,339	32.28%	707	9.76%
1912	2,309	30.05%	1,957	25.47%	3,417	44.47%
1916	3,926	51.29%	3,308	43.22%	420	5.49%
1920	7,194	69.93%	2,595	25.23%	498	4.84%
1924	8,987	72.99%	1,738	14.12%	1,588	12.90%
1928	9,851	79.40%	2,496	20.12%	60	0.48%
1932	6,600	44.19%	8,002	53.58%	334	2.24%
1936	6,017	43.36%	6,666	48.03%	1,195	8.61%
1940	9,995	63.24%	5,727	36.24%	82	0.52%
1944	11,601	68.41%	5,292	31.21%	64	0.38%
1948	10,377	66.97%	4,852	31.31%	267	1.72%
1952	13,562	68.41%	6,056	30.55%	206	1.04%
1956	14,600	67.75%	6,873	31.89%	78	0.36%
1960	13,757	60.86%	8,773	38.81%	74	0.33%
1964	7,786	36.21%	13,676	63.60%	41	0.19%
1968	11,465	50.88%	8,619	38.25%	2,448	10.86%
1972	15,489	61.62%	8,932	35.53%	715	2.84%
1976	15,113	54.52%	12,202	44.02%	406	1.46%
1980	15,756	51.71%	11,985	39.33%	2,729	8.96%
1984	18,756	65.97%	9,514	33.46%	161	0.57%
1988	15,506	53.94%	13,056	45.42%	186	0.65%
1992	10,930	33.78%	12,629	39.03%	8,801	27.20%
1996	11,714	38.56%	14,662	48.27%	3,999	13.17%
2000	15,816	49.09%	15,520	48.17%	882	2.74%
2004	19,407	52.95%	16,881	46.06%	363	0.99%
2008	16,268	44.67%	19,397	53.27%	750	2.06%
2012	15,962	47.39%	17,197	51.06%	520	1.54%
2016	19,230	56.37%	12,546	36.78%	2,335	6.85%
2020	23,149	58.90%	15,347	39.05%	805	2.05%
2024	24,718	60.75%	15,335	37.69%	632	1.55%

United States Senate election results for Shiawassee County, Michigan1
Year	Republican		Democratic		Third party(ies)	
Year	No.	%	No.	%	No.	%
2024	23,505	58.61%	15,476	38.59%	1,122	2.80%

Michigan Gubernatorial election results for Shiawassee County
Year	Republican		Democratic		Third party(ies)	
Year	No.	%	No.	%	No.	%
2022	16,969	52.37%	14,730	45.46%	703	2.17%

== Government ==
The county government operates the jail, maintains rural roads, operates the major local courts, records deeds, mortgages, and vital records, administers public health regulations, and participates with the state in the provision of social services. The county board of commissioners controls the budget and has limited authority to make laws or ordinances. In Michigan, most local government functions — police and fire, building and zoning, tax assessment, street maintenance, etc. — are the responsibility of individual cities and townships.

=== COVID-19 hazard pay scandal ===
On July 25, 2021, it was revealed that the county's board of commissioners paid themselves a total of $65,000 out of a $557,000 federal relief funds earmarked for county employee hazard pay due to the COVID-19 pandemic. Employees typically received $1,000 to $2,000. The seven member board of commissioners voted themselves $5,000 for four members, $10,000 for two, and the chairman of the county commissioners $25,000. Following days of criticism, a Shiawassee prosecutor declared the bonuses illegal; commissioners responded that they would return the money.

=== Elected officials ===
- Governor: Gretchen Whitmer (D)
- Lt. Governor: Garlin Gilchrist (D)
- Attorney General: Dana Nessel (D)
- Secretary of State: Jocelyn Benson (D)
- U.S. Rep 7th District: Tom Barrett (R)
- State Senator 28th District: Sam Singh (D)
- State Senator Lana Theis 22nd District: Lana Theis (R)
- State Rep. 71st District: Brian BeGole (R)
- State Rep. 75th District: Penelope Tsernoglou (D)
- Prosecutor: Scott Koerner (R)
- Sheriff: Doug Chapman (R)
- County Clerk: Caroline Wilson (R)
- County Treasurer: Julie Sorenson (R)
- Register of Deeds: Lori Kimble (R)
- Drain Commissioner: Tony Newman (D)
- County Surveyor: William Wascher (R)
- Road Commissioners: Mike Continue (R); Ric Crawford (R); John Plowman (R)
- Commissioner District 1: Josh Haley (R)
- Commissioner District 2: Greg Brodeur (R)
- Commissioner District 3: Gary Holzhausen (R)
- Commissioner District 4: Bill Johnson (R)
- Commissioner District 5: Brad Howard (R)
- Commissioner District 6: Cindy Garber (R)
- Commissioner District 7: Matthew Shepard (R)

(information as of January 2025)

== Communities ==
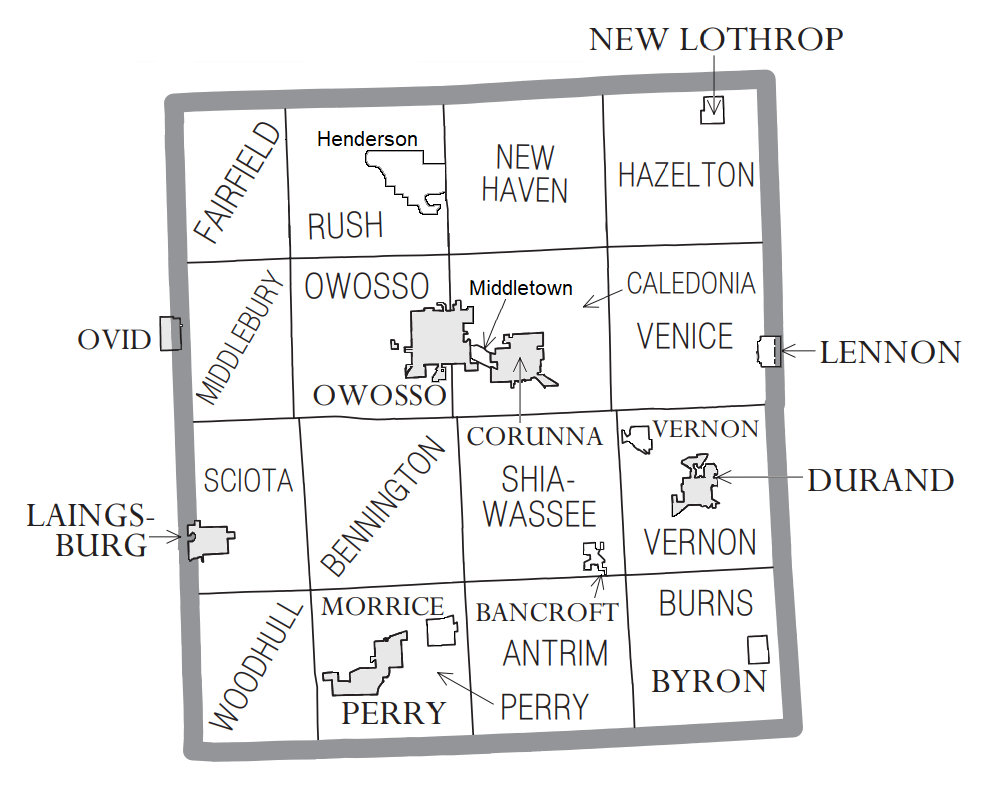
U.S. Census data map showing local municipal boundaries within Shiawassee County, as well as CDP boundaries. Shaded areas represent incorporated cities.

=== Cities ===
- Corunna (county seat)
- Durand
- Laingsburg
- Ovid (partial)
- Owosso
- Perry

=== Villages ===
- Bancroft
- Byron
- Lennon
- Morrice
- New Lothrop
- Vernon

=== Charter townships ===
- Caledonia Charter Township
- Owosso Charter Township

=== Civil townships ===
- Antrim Township
- Bennington Township
- Burns Township
- Fairfield Township
- Hazelton Township
- Middlebury Township
- New Haven Township
- Perry Township
- Rush Township
- Sciota Township
- Shiawassee Township
- Venice Township
- Vernon Township
- Woodhull Township

=== Census-designated places ===
- Henderson
- Middletown
- Shaftsburg

=== Other unincorporated communities ===
- Antrim Center
- Bennington
- Burton
- Carland
- Easton
- Five Points
- Forest Green Estates
- Hoovers Corners
- Juddville
- Kerby
- Newburg
- New Haven
- Nicholson
- Olney Corners
- Pittsburg
- Shiawasseetown
- Smith Crossing
- Union Plains

== See also ==
- List of Michigan State Historic Sites in Shiawassee County
- National Register of Historic Places listings in Shiawassee County, Michigan
