= Martha A. Boughton =

American poet

- Born: Martha Elizabeth Arnold; February 18, 1857; Corunna, Michigan, U.S.
- Died: May 18, 1928 (aged 71); Brooklyn, New York, U.S.
- Other name: "Mattie"
- Education: Northwestern University; University of Michigan
- Occupations: educator, author, poet, clubwoman
- Spouse: Willis Boughton (m. 1884)
- Children: 2 sons
- Writing career
- Subjects: biographies; poetry; religious music and lyrics

Martha A. Boughton (née, Arnold; February 18, 1857 – May 18, 1928) was an American educator, author, poet, and clubwoman. She wrote biographies as well as religious music and lyrics. Among her publications can be counted Memoir of Rev. John Motte Arnold, D.D. (1885), The Quest of a Soul, and Other Verse (1911), Onward (1918), and Mystery and Other Poems (1926).

== Early life and education ==
Martha ("Mattie") Elizabeth Arnold was born in Corunna, Michigan, February 18, 1857. (Note: According to Boughton's obituary in The Brooklyn Daily Eagle, she was born in 1856.) She was a daughter of John Motte Arnold, D.D., and Hannah E. (Redway) Arnold.

Boughton's education included Detroit High School; Northwestern University, in Evanston, Illinois, one year; and the University of Michigan (Ph.B., 1880).

== Career ==
During the period of 1880-84, Boughton was a teacher in Michigan's public and high schools.

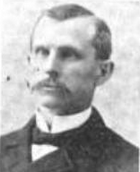
Willis Boughton

In Detroit, Michigan, July 4, 1884, she married Willis Boughton, Ph.D. (1854-1942), director, Chemical Laboratory, Harvard College. They had two sons, Willis Boughton and Paul Ninde Boughton.

Boughton engaged in various religious, social and philanthropic activities.

In Athens, Ohio, in 1895, she was the leader of the local Young Woman's Christian Temperance Union (WCTU). In that role, she was one of the delegates selected to represent the state of Ohio at the World's WCTU conference, London. Two years later, still in Athens, she served as president of the Pallas Club, 1897-1899. In Brooklyn, she served as secretary, Board of Managers of the city's Deaconess' Home. Her club work also included Fortnightly of Flatbush, Brooklyn (literary), Esperanto Association of North America, and the Woman's Club of the University of Michigan (alumnae). She also helped organize the Thursday Musical Circle.

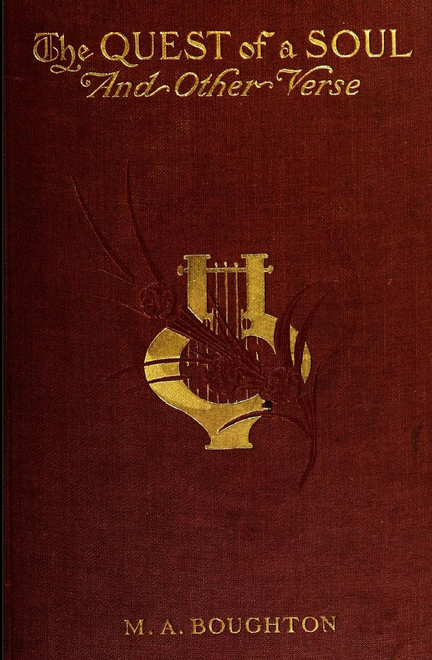
"The Quest of a Soul And Other Verse", 1911

Boughton was the author of Biography of Rev. J. M. Arnold, D.D. (1885), The Quest of a Soul, and Other Verse (F. H. Revell Co., 1911), Mystery and Other Poems, and Stars Through Cypress Trees. She contributed to various magazines and papers, including the Western Christian Advocate. She also wrote religious songs (words and music), such as "Little Christian soldiers" (infant class hymn; words and music by Boughton, 1903), and "Onward, little soldiers, Battle 'gainst the wrong" (lyrics by Boughton).

== Personal life ==
In religion, Boughton affiliated with the Methodist Episcopal Church. She traveled in Europe summers of 1895 and 1906. After having been ill for two years, she died in Brooklyn's Caledonian Hospital, May 18, 1928.

== Selected works ==
- Memoir of Rev. John Motte Arnold, D.D. (1885)
- The Quest of a Soul, and Other Verse (1911)
- Onward (1918)
- Mystery and Other Poems (1926)
- Stars Through Cypress Trees

=== Songs ===
- "Little Christian soldiers" (1903)
- "Onward, little soldiers, Battle 'gainst the wrong"
