= Middlebury Township, Michigan =

- Civil township
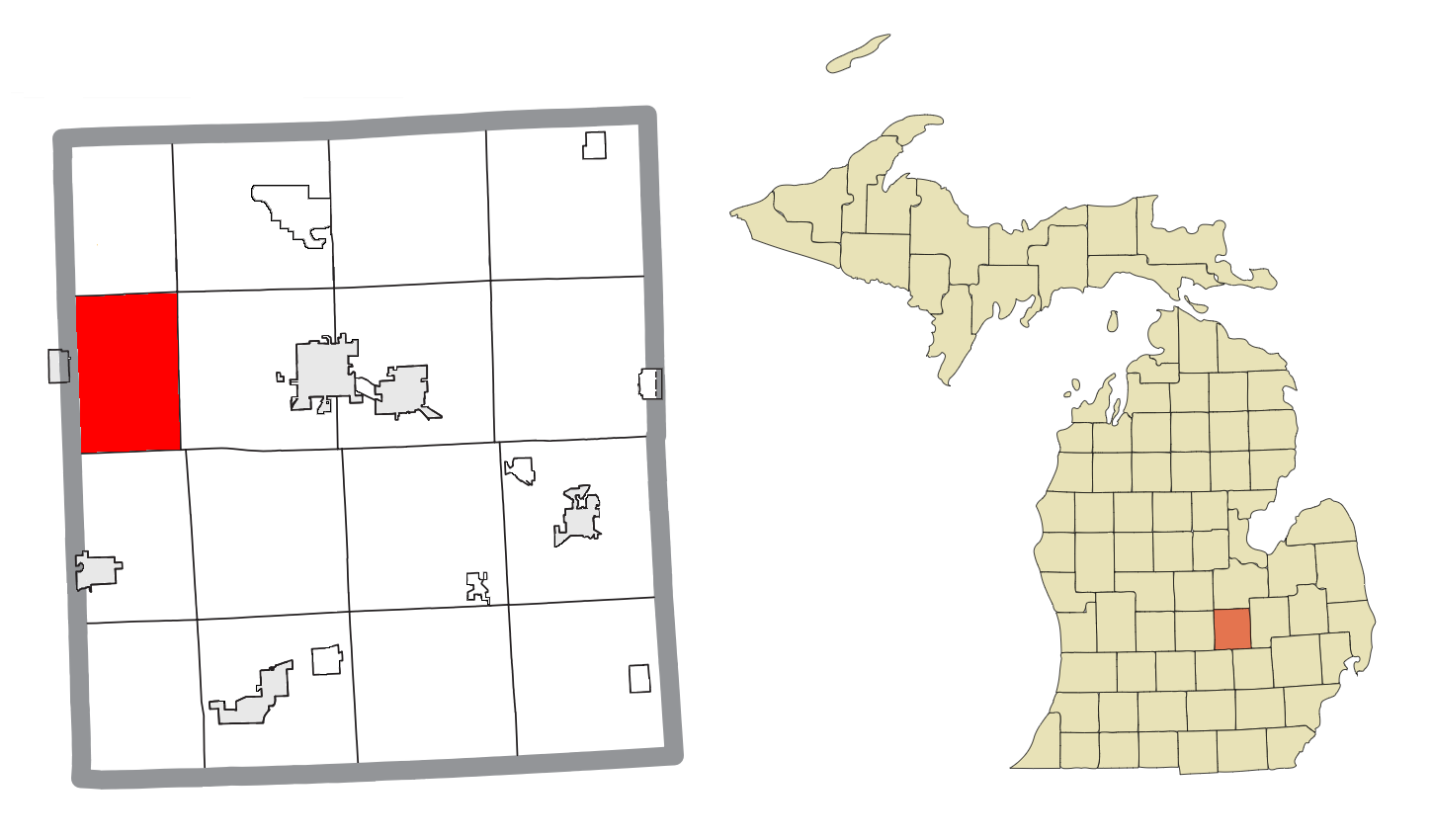
- Location within Shiawassee County

- Location within the state of Michigan Middlebury Township (the United States)
- Coordinates: 42°59′39″N 84°19′54″W
- Country: United States
- State: Michigan
- County: Shiawassee
- Established: 1838

Government
  - Supervisor: Michael Herendeen
  - Clerk: Jamie Aldrich

Area
  - Total: 24.84 sq mi (64.3 km^{2})
  - Land: 24.76 sq mi (64.1 km^{2})
  - Water: 0.08 sq mi (0.21 km^{2})
- Elevation: 741 ft (226 m)

Population (2020)
  - Total: 1,529
  - Density: 61.75/sq mi (23.84/km^{2})
- Time zone: UTC-5 (Eastern (EST))
  - Summer (DST): UTC-4 (EDT)
- ZIP code(s): 48866 (Ovid); 48867 (Owosso)
- Area code: 989
- FIPS code: 26-53680
- GNIS feature ID: 1626735
- Website: Official website

Middlebury Township is a civil township of Shiawassee County in the U.S. state of Michigan. As of the 2020 census, the township population was 1,529.

The township is located about 5 miles (8.0 km) west of the city of Owosso. The village of Ovid had a very small portion within Middlebury Township until Ovid incorporated as an autonomous city in 2015. M-21 passes east–west through the center of the township.

== Geography ==
According to the United States Census Bureau, the township has a total area of 24.84 square miles (64.34 km^{2}), of which 24.76 square miles (64.13 km^{2}) is land and 0.08 square miles (0.21 km^{2}) (0.32%) is water.

== Demographics ==
As of the census of 2000, there were 1,491 people, 565 households, and 431 families residing in the township. The population density was 60.3 inhabitants per square mile (23.3/km^{2}). There were 600 housing units at an average density of 24.3 per square mile (9.4/km^{2}). The racial makeup of the township was 98.26% White, 0.27% African American, 0.20% Native American, 0.20% Asian, 0.40% from other races, and 0.67% from two or more races. Hispanic or Latino of any race were 1.41% of the population.

There were 565 households, out of which 35.0% had children under the age of 18 living with them, 63.9% were married couples living together, 7.6% had a female householder with no husband present, and 23.7% were non-families. 19.3% of all households were made up of individuals, and 6.4% had someone living alone who was 65 years of age or older. The average household size was 2.64 and the average family size was 3.01.

In the township the population was spread out, with 26.0% under the age of 18, 7.6% from 18 to 24, 30.1% from 25 to 44, 25.2% from 45 to 64, and 11.0% who were 65 years of age or older. The median age was 36 years. For every 100 females, there were 104.5 males. For every 100 females age 18 and over, there were 105.0 males.

The median income for a household in the township was $45,313, and the median income for a family was $50,595. Males had a median income of $37,989 versus $23,929 for females. The per capita income for the township was $18,398. About 1.4% of families and 2.4% of the population were below the poverty line, including 1.6% of those under age 18 and 1.3% of those age 65 or over.

== Highways ==
- M-21
