= Caledonia Township, Shiawassee County, Michigan =

Caledonia Township, Michigan
- Charter township
- Caledonia Charter Township
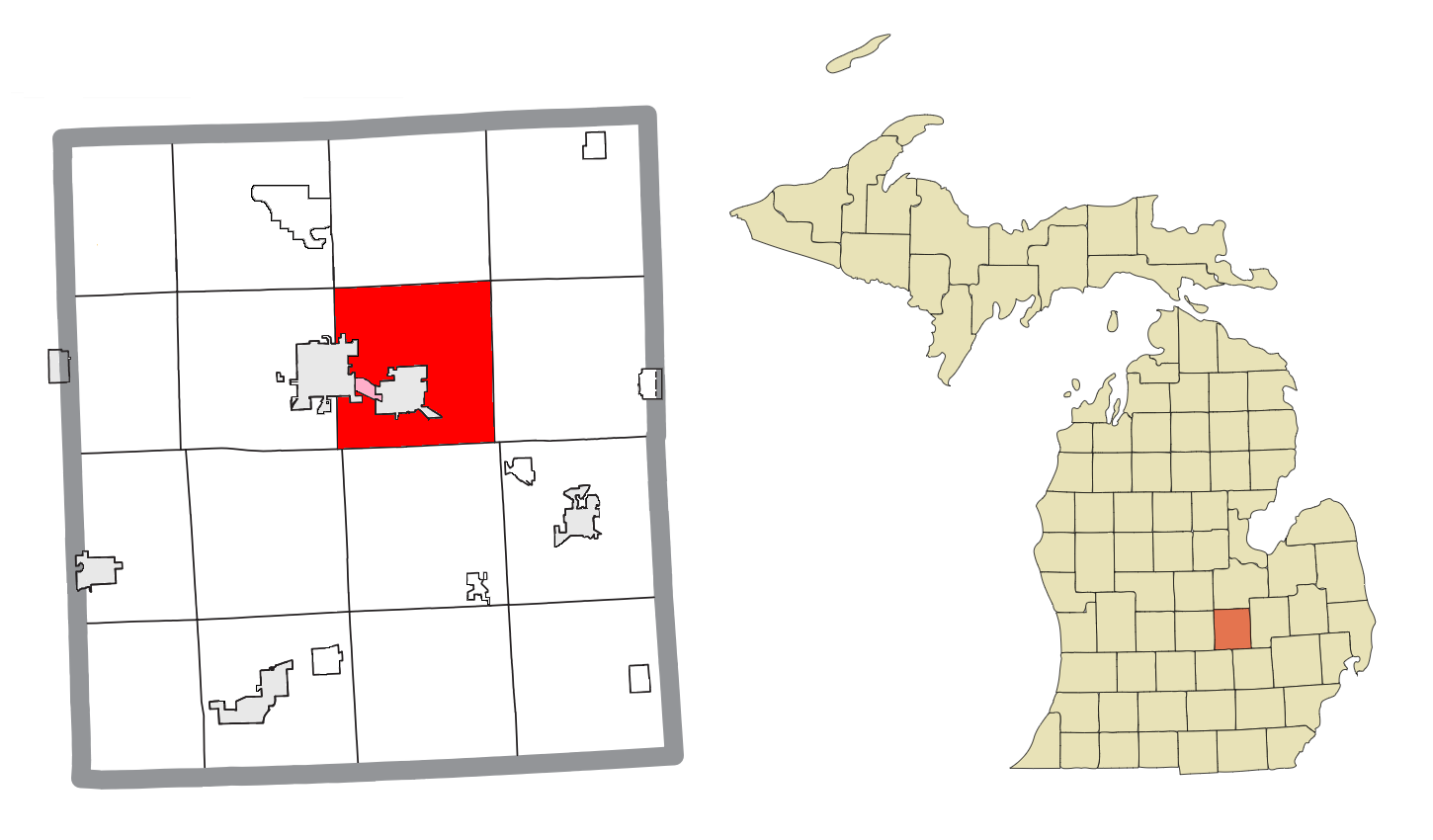
- Location within Shiawassee County (red) and the administered community of Middletown (pink)

- Location within the state of Michigan
- Coordinates: 42°59′32″N 84°07′42″W
- Country: United States
- State: Michigan
- County: Shiawassee

Government
  - Supervisor: Amy Holek
  - Clerk: Marcy Brady

Area
  - Total: 31.39 sq mi (81.3 km^{2})
  - Land: 31.12 sq mi (80.6 km^{2})
  - Water: 0.27 sq mi (0.70 km^{2})
- Elevation: 750 ft (230 m)

Population (2020)
  - Total: 4,360
  - Density: 140/sq mi (54.1/km^{2})
- Time zone: UTC-5 (Eastern (EST))
  - Summer (DST): UTC-4 (EDT)
- ZIP code(s): 48817 (Corunna); 48867 (Owosso)
- Area code: 989
- FIPS code: 26-12520
- GNIS feature ID: 1626021
- Website: Official website

Caledonia Charter Township is a charter township of Shiawassee County in the U.S. state of Michigan. The population was 4,360 at the 2020 census.

== Communities ==
- Kerby is an unincorporated community within the township on Kerby Road. State maps place it at Serr Road while the Federal government places it on Shipman Road from Kerby Road.42°59′58″N 84°04′09″W, 43°00′02″N 84°04′03″W The community was named for Samuel W. Kerby, an early settler.
- Middletown is an unincorporated area and census-designated place within the township between Corunna and Owosso.

== Geography ==
According to the United States Census Bureau, the township has a total area of 31.39 square miles (81.3 km^{2}), of which 31.12 square miles (80.6 km^{2}) is land and 0.27 square miles (0.70 km^{2}) (0.86%) is water.

== Demographics ==
As of the census of 2000, there were 4,427 people, 1,712 households, and 1,287 families residing in the township. The population density was 139.8 inhabitants per square mile (54.0/km^{2}). There were 1,794 housing units at an average density of 56.7 per square mile (21.9/km^{2}). The racial makeup of the township was 97.24% White, 0.14% African American, 0.32% Native American, 0.61% Asian, 0.02% Pacific Islander, 0.68% from other races, and 0.99% from two or more races. Hispanic or Latino of any race were 1.65% of the population.

There were 1,712 households, out of which 32.2% had children under the age of 18 living with them, 63.4% were married couples living together, 8.2% had a female householder with no husband present, and 24.8% were non-families. 20.9% of all households were made up of individuals, and 10.1% had someone living alone who was 65 years of age or older. The average household size was 2.58 and the average family size was 2.97.

In the township the population was spread out, with 24.2% under the age of 18, 7.4% from 18 to 24, 28.2% from 25 to 44, 27.0% from 45 to 64, and 13.2% who were 65 years of age or older. The median age was 40 years. For every 100 females, there were 97.9 males. For every 100 females age 18 and over, there were 95.3 males.

The median income for a household in the township was $42,139, and the median income for a family was $50,564. Males had a median income of $40,483 versus $26,971 for females. The per capita income for the township was $19,385. About 5.7% of families and 5.7% of the population were below the poverty line, including 3.1% of those under age 18 and 10.0% of those age 65 or over. Amy Holek (R), currently serves as the Caledonia Charter Township Supervisor, a position she was first appointed to in November 2021.

== Transportation ==
=== Highways ===
- M-21
- M-52 (runs south–north just outside of the western boundary of the township)
- M-71

=== Airport ===
- Owosso Community Airport

== See also ==
- McArthur Mining Company – Michigan's first coal mine.
