= Durand, Michigan =

- City
- City of Durand
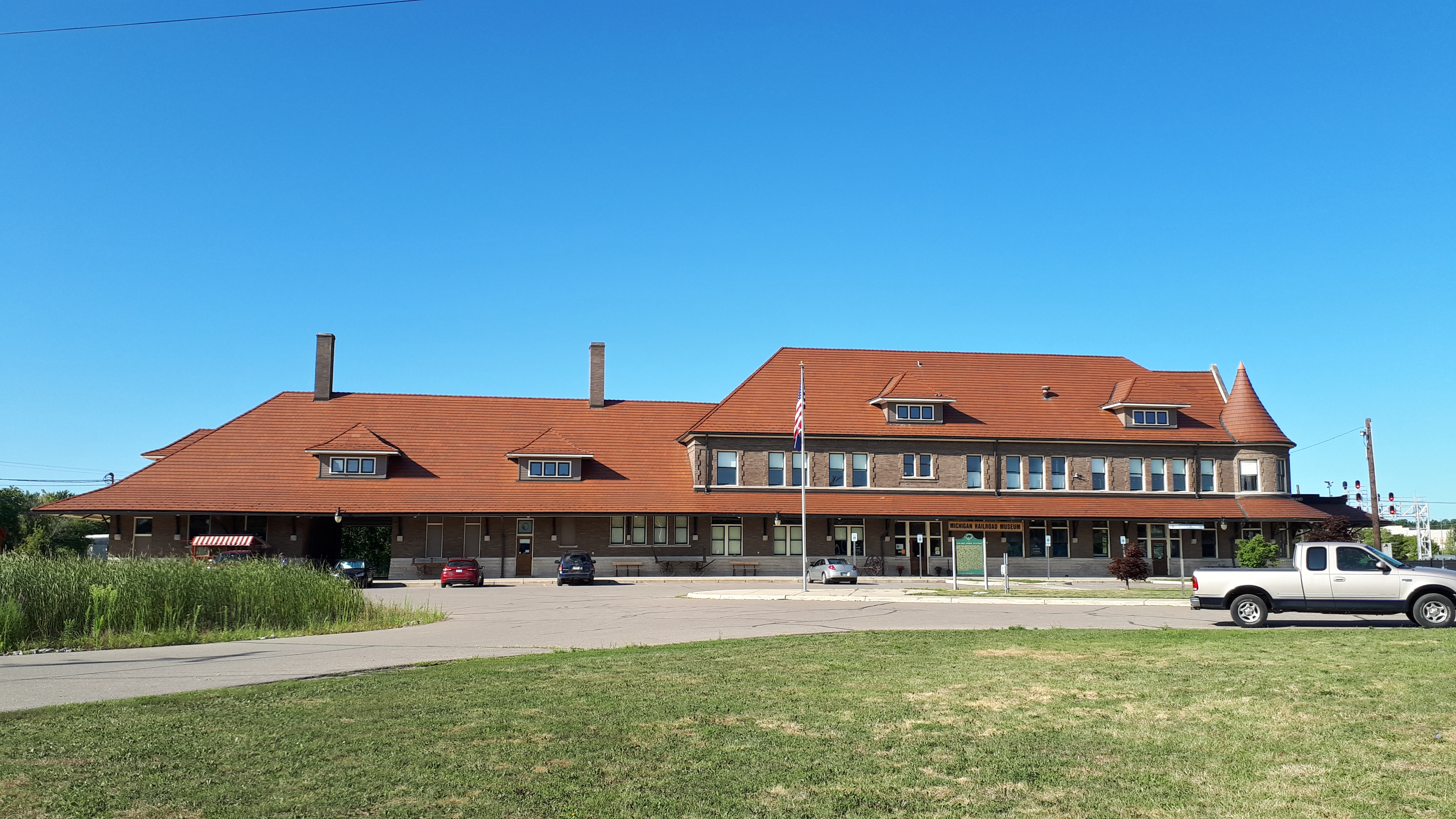
- Durand Union Station
- Nickname: Railroad City, USA
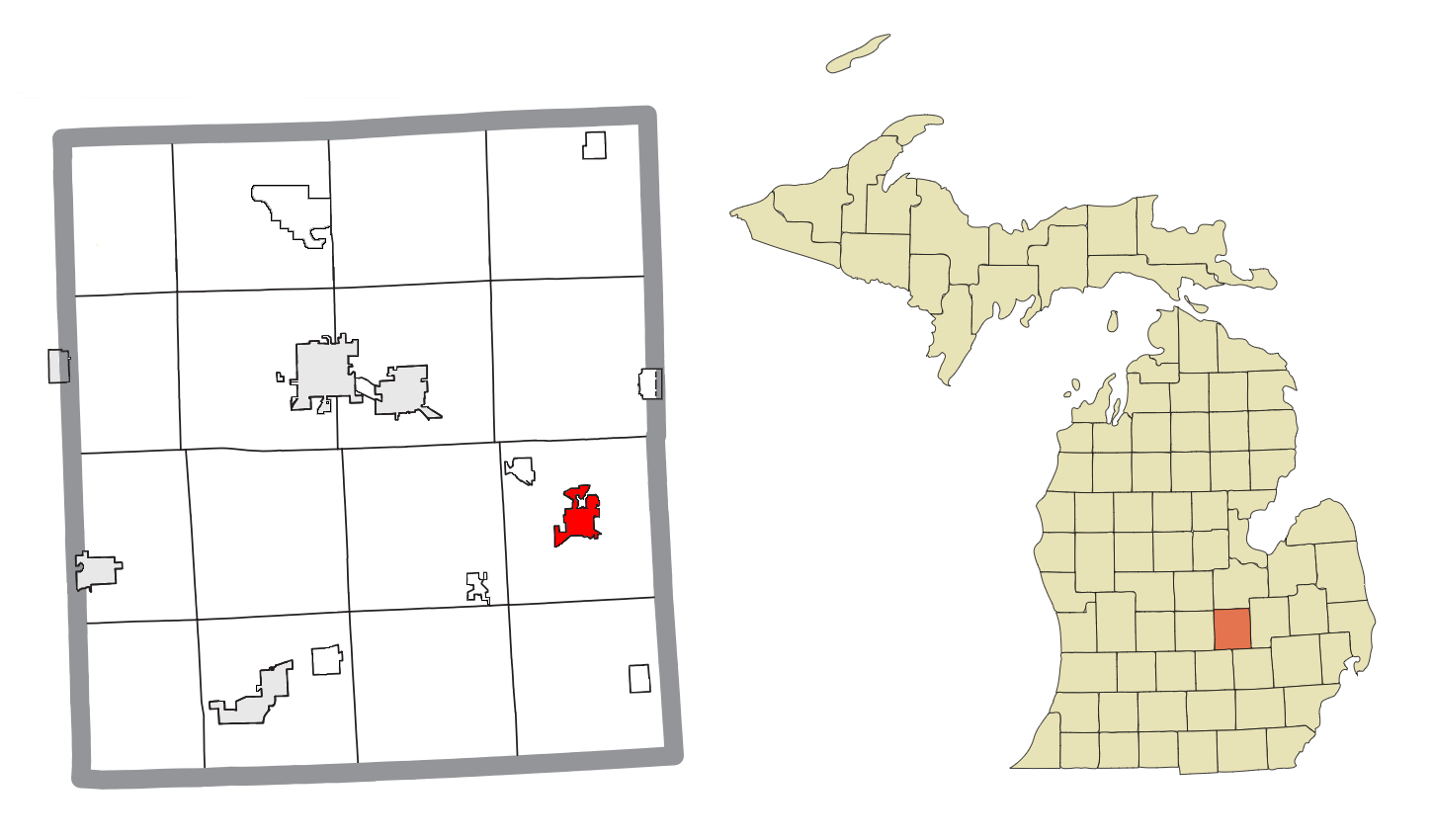
- Location within Shiawassee County

- Location within the state of Michigan
- Coordinates: 42°54′46″N 83°59′21″W
- Country: United States
- State: Michigan
- County: Shiawassee
- Platted: 1836
- Incorporated: 1887 (village); 1932 (city)

Government
  - Type: Council–manager
  - Mayor: Jeff Brands
  - Manager: Cameron Horvath

Area
  - Total: 1.95 sq mi (5.06 km^{2})
  - Land: 1.95 sq mi (5.06 km^{2})
  - Water: 0 sq mi (0.00 km^{2})
- Elevation: 794 ft (242 m)

Population (2020)
  - Total: 3,507
  - Density: 1,795.3/sq mi (693.16/km^{2})
- Time zone: UTC-5 (Eastern (EST))
  - Summer (DST): UTC-4 (EDT)
- ZIP code(s): 48429
- Area code: 989
- FIPS code: 26-23500
- GNIS feature ID: 1626198
- Website: www.durandmi.com

Durand (doo-RAND) is a city in Shiawassee County in the U.S. state of Michigan. The population was 3,507 at the 2020 census. Nicknamed "Railroad City, USA", it is best known for its large train station which was a major hub for the Grand Trunk Western and Ann Arbor railroads during most of the 20th century, and is currently served by Amtrak. Additionally, three freight carriers use a rail yard in the city, which is accessible from all directions.

== History ==
Durand was originally called Vernon Center, and under the latter name was platted in 1836 and named from its location in Vernon Township. The present name is for congressman George H. Durand of Flint, Michigan. Durand was incorporated as a village in 1887 and as a city in 1932.

In a 1967 National Educational Radio Network radio series, local seniors discussed the early 20th Century history of the town; there were at one point over 10 bars in town where locals could get alcohol and there were often fights, with men coming from other towns to fight the tough men of Durand. Residents also recalled the Ku Klux Klan burning crosses downtown and organizing rallies against local Catholic residents. The railroad was a fascination with the local children, who often got too close to the tracks and about "once a generation" a child would lose their life playing along the railroad tracks.

== Geography ==
External audio
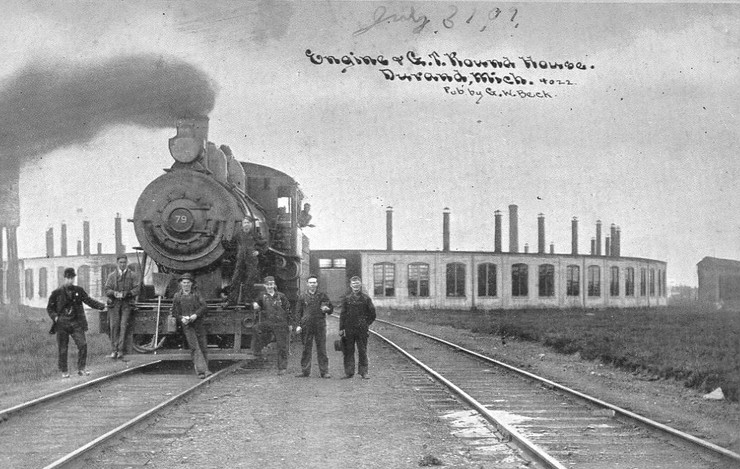
- The American Town: A Self-Portrait: Durand, Michigan, 1967, 29:50, American Archive of Public Broadcasting

According to the United States Census Bureau, the city has a total area of 2.11 square miles (5.46 km^{2}), of which 2.10 square miles (5.44 km^{2}) is land and 0.01 square miles (0.03 km^{2}) (0.47%) is water.

== Demographics ==
Historical population
Census	Pop.	Note	%±
1880	210		—
1890	255		21.4%
1900	2,134		736.9%
1910	2,315		8.5%
1920	2,672		15.4%
1930	3,081		15.3%
1940	3,127		1.5%
1950	3,194		2.1%
1960	3,312		3.7%
1970	3,678		11.1%
1980	4,206		14.4%
1990	4,283		1.8%
2000	3,933		−8.2%
2010	3,446		−12.4%
2020	3,507		1.8%
U.S. Decennial Census

=== 2020 census ===
As of the 2020 census, Durand had a population of 3,507. The median age was 41.7 years. 20.5% of residents were under the age of 18 and 19.9% of residents were 65 years of age or older. For every 100 females there were 90.6 males, and for every 100 females age 18 and over there were 87.4 males age 18 and over.

100.0% of residents lived in urban areas, while 0.0% lived in rural areas.

There were 1,540 households in Durand, of which 27.3% had children under the age of 18 living in them. Of all households, 37.0% were married-couple households, 21.0% were households with a male householder and no spouse or partner present, and 32.1% were households with a female householder and no spouse or partner present. About 35.4% of all households were made up of individuals and 16.9% had someone living alone who was 65 years of age or older.

There were 1,636 housing units, of which 5.9% were vacant. The homeowner vacancy rate was 1.4% and the rental vacancy rate was 2.9%.

Racial composition as of the 2020 census
Race	Number	Percent
White	3,219	91.8%
Black or African American	7	0.2%
American Indian and Alaska Native	13	0.4%
Asian	15	0.4%
Native Hawaiian and Other Pacific Islander	6	0.2%
Some other race	16	0.5%
Two or more races	231	6.6%
Hispanic or Latino (of any race)	96	2.7%

=== 2010 census ===
As of the census of 2010, there were 3,446 people, 1,350 households, and 852 families living in the city. The population density was 1,641.0 inhabitants per square mile (633.6/km^{2}). There were 1,575 housing units at an average density of 750.0 per square mile (289.6/km^{2}). The racial makeup of the city was 96.3% White, 0.6% African American, 1.0% Native American, 0.1% Asian, 0.5% from other races, and 1.5% from two or more races. Hispanic or Latino of any race were 2.9% of the population.

There were 1,350 households, of which 35.0% had children under the age of 18 living with them, 42.5% were married couples living together, 14.7% had a female householder with no husband present, 5.9% had a male householder with no wife present, and 36.9% were non-families. 31.9% of all households were made up of individuals, and 13.8% had someone living alone who was 65 years of age or older. The average household size was 2.45 and the average family size was 3.08.

The median age in the city was 37.2 years. 25.8% of residents were under the age of 18; 9% were between the ages of 18 and 24; 25.3% were from 25 to 44; 24.1% were from 45 to 64; and 15.7% were 65 years of age or older. The gender makeup of the city was 46.8% male and 53.2% female.

=== 2000 census ===
As of the census of 2000, there were 3,933 people, 1,481 households, and 1,008 families living in the city. The population density was 1,999.6 inhabitants per square mile (772.0/km^{2}). There were 1,561 housing units at an average density of 793.6 per square mile (306.4/km^{2}). The racial makeup of the city was 96.95% White, 0.08% African American, 0.66% Native American, 0.08% Asian, 0.03% Pacific Islander, 0.56% from other races, and 1.65% from two or more races. Hispanic or Latino of any race were 1.78% of the population.

There were 1,481 households, out of which 35.9% had children under the age of 18 living with them, 49.5% were married couples living together, 13.8% had a female householder with no husband present, and 31.9% were non-families. 26.8% of all households were made up of individuals, and 12.6% had someone living alone who was 65 years of age or older. The average household size was 2.55 and the average family size was 3.10.

In the city, the population was spread out, with 27.2% under the age of 18, 9.4% from 18 to 24, 29.6% from 25 to 44, 18.9% from 45 to 64, and 14.9% who were 65 years of age or older. The median age was 35 years. For every 100 females, there were 88.3 males. For every 100 females age 18 and over, there were 84.8 males.

The median income for a household in the city was $36,563, and the median income for a family was $43,306. Males had a median income of $42,716 versus $22,033 for females. The per capita income for the city was $17,273. About 8.9% of families and 11.3% of the population were below the poverty line, including 16.0% of those under age 18 and 8.5% of those age 65 or over.

== Infrastructure ==
=== Highways ===
- I-69 forms a northwest boundary of Durand
- M-71 ends at I-69 slightly outside the northwest corner of the city limits

=== Railways ===
Railroads have always played a major role in Durand's history and economy. Amtrak, the national passenger rail system, provides daily service on the Blue Water route between Chicago and Port Huron, Michigan. Amtrak trains stop at the historic Durand Union Station which is located at the junction of major east/west (historically, Grand Trunk Western, east to Port Huron and Toronto, west to Chicago), and north/south (historically, Ann Arbor Railroad, north to Elberta, Michigan, south to Toledo, Ohio) rail lines.

Freight railroads operating in Durand include Canadian National Railway (CN), Huron and Eastern Railway (HESR), and Great Lakes Central Railroad (GLC).
