= Charles H. Calkins House =

- U.S. National Register of Historic Places
- Michigan State Historic Site
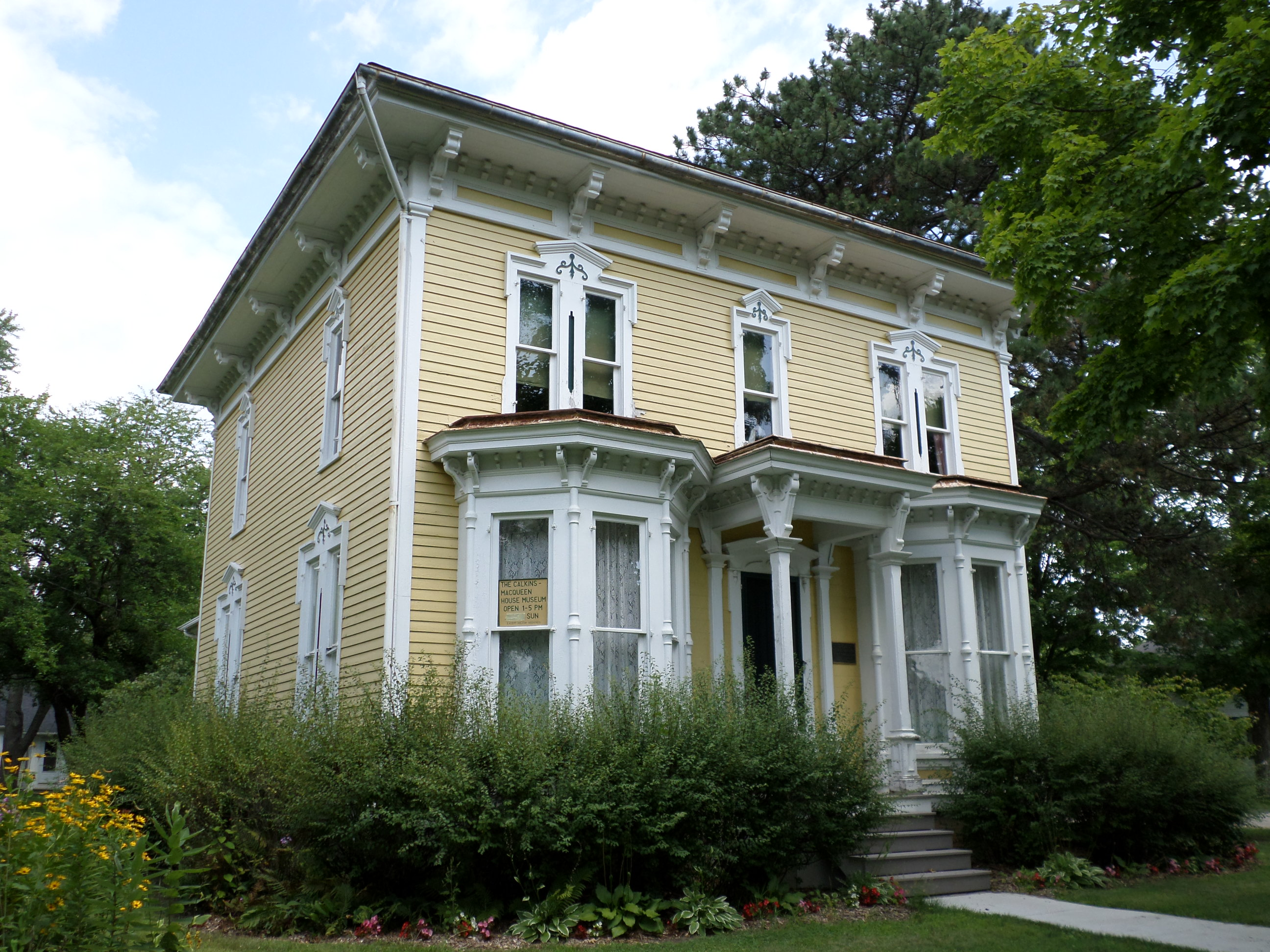
- Interactive map
- Location: 127 E. 1st St., Perry, Michigan
- Coordinates: 42°49′27″N 84°13′05″W
- Area: 0.7 acres (0.28 ha)
- Built: 1870
- Architectural style: Italianate
- NRHP reference No.: 78001511
- Added to NRHP: March 29, 1978

The Charles H. Calkins House, originally built as a single-family home, is located at 127 East 1st Street in Perry, Michigan. It now houses the Calkins-McQueen Museum, and was listed on the National Register of Historic Places in 1978.

== History ==
Charles H. Calkins came to Michigan in 1855 with his father and uncle, and claimed 60 acres of farming land. He cleared the land and resold it, the purchased 160 acres nearer the main state road. The new farm prospered, and in about 1870 Calkins built a large house for his family.

In the late 1890s, a rail line was planned through the area, and local residents voted to establish a depot and village at the point where the line crossed the main state road. This turned out to be on Calkins's farmland, and in 1900 Calings opened his lands for purchase, founding the village of Perry. Calkins himself was instrumental in the growth of the village, starting the first general store, serving in various capacities in the village government, helping start a local bank and factory, and helping found three local churches.

Calkins lived in his house until his death in 1917. His remaining property, including his house, was inherited by his daughter, Bessie Calkins MacQueen. At her death in 1941, Mrs. MacQueen donated the house to the Village of Perry, under the condition that it be left standing and kept in good condition. The village used it for storage, or rented it out, until the early 1970s. At that time, the village planned to tear it down to construct a new city hall complex. However, it was eventually turned over to the Perry Historical Society, who developed it into the Calkins-McQueen Museum.

== Description ==
The Calkins House is a square, two-story, clapboarded, Italianate building with a symmetrical arrangement of doors and windows on the front facade. The first floor has a central entrance flanked by tri-sided bay windows. One-over-one sash window units are on the sides of the bays, an ornamental cornice is above and fielded panels are below. The main entrance is within a small porch with an arched molding at the top. A heavy cornice moldings similar to those over the bay windows is above, and two square columns with molded caps support the porch roof. The second story level has a narrow central one-over-one hung sash window flanked by two larger windows, each created by two one-over-one hung sash units. The windows are decorated with carved ornaments. A hipped roof tops the house.
