= Owosso Community Airport =

- IATA: none; ICAO: KRNP; FAA LID: RNP

Summary
- Airport type: Public
- Owner: Shiawassee Airport Board
- Serves: Owosso, Michigan, Corunna, Michigan
- Location: Caledonia Charter Township
- Elevation AMSL: 736 ft / 224 m
- Coordinates: 42°59′34.66″N 084°08′18.55″W
- Website: www.KRNP.org

Map
- Location of airport in Michigan RNP (the United States)

Runways
Direction	Length		Surface
Direction	ft	m	Surface
11/29	4,300	1,311	Asphalt
6/24	2,483	757	Turf
18/36	2,599	792	Turf

Statistics (2008)
- Aircraft operations: 25,000
- Based aircraft: 61
- Source: Federal Aviation Administration

Owosso Community Airport (ICAO: KRNP, FAA LID: RNP) is a public-use airport located in Caledonia Charter Township, two miles (3 km) east of Owosso, between the cities of Owosso and Corunna, in Shiawassee County, Michigan, United States. It is owned by the Shiawassee Airport Board, a multi-government authority with five voting members from Shiawassee County, the cities of Owosso and Corunna, and the townships of Owosso and Caledonia. It is included in the Federal Aviation Administration (FAA) National Plan of Integrated Airport Systems for 2017–2021, in which it is categorized as a local general aviation facility.

== History ==
One of the earliest references to the airport is in the 1924 Owosso City Directory.

A dedication for the 78 acres (32 ha) airport, owned by Robert Wilcox and Charles Wilson, was held on August 3, 1929.

In the early 1940s, the airport was transferred to Shiawassee County, later to the city of Owosso.

The airport was officially named the Owosso City Airport in June 1949.

The first jet to land at Owosso Airport was a two engine Learjet from Omaha, Nebraska, in 1966.

The City of Owosso deeded the airport over to the Shiawassee Airport Board in July 1982.

An expansion of the main runway to 4,300 feet (1,311 m) was completed in 2005.

== Facilities and aircraft ==
Owosso Community Airport occupies an area of 279 acres (113 ha) at an elevation of 736 feet (224 m) above mean sea level. It has one asphalt paved runway: 11/29 is 4,300 by 75 feet (1,311 x 23 m). The airport also has two turf runways: 6/24 is 2,446 by 130 feet (746 x 40 m) and 18/36 is 2,509 by 260 feet (765 x 79 m).

The airport has a fixed-base operator that sells avgas and offers amenities such as hangars for aircraft, a conference room, a crew lounge, and more.

For the 12-month period ending December 31, 2020, the airport had 21,900 aircraft operations, an average of 60 per day. It is composed entirely of general aviation. At that time there were 57 aircraft based at this airport: 50 single-engine and five multi-engine airplanes as well as two helicopters.

The airport also has its own automated weather observing station.

== Accidents and incidents ==
- On September 10, 1999, a Reichert MJ-77 sustained substantial damage during a forced landing at Owosso Community Airport. A witness who saw the aircraft depart saw contrails, which were black in color, coming from the wings, and he reported the airplane turned back to the airport and was in level flight about 100 to 150 feet above the ground with the engine running. The aircraft then reportedly nosed down and crashed on the north side of the runway. Another witness reported black fluid was leaking from the wings. A postcrash investigation by the FAA revealed the engine oil tank filler neck was found without its cap engaged. This filler neck and cap assembly has a positive locking feature when closed. The probable cause was found to be the pilot's improper preflight which resulted in a takeoff with the oil cap not secured and the subsequent loss of engine power.
- On March 17, 2018, a Mooney M20C landed gear-up at the airport.

== See also ==
- List of airports in Michigan
