= Fairfield Township, Shiawassee County, Michigan =

Fairfield Township, Michigan
- Civil township
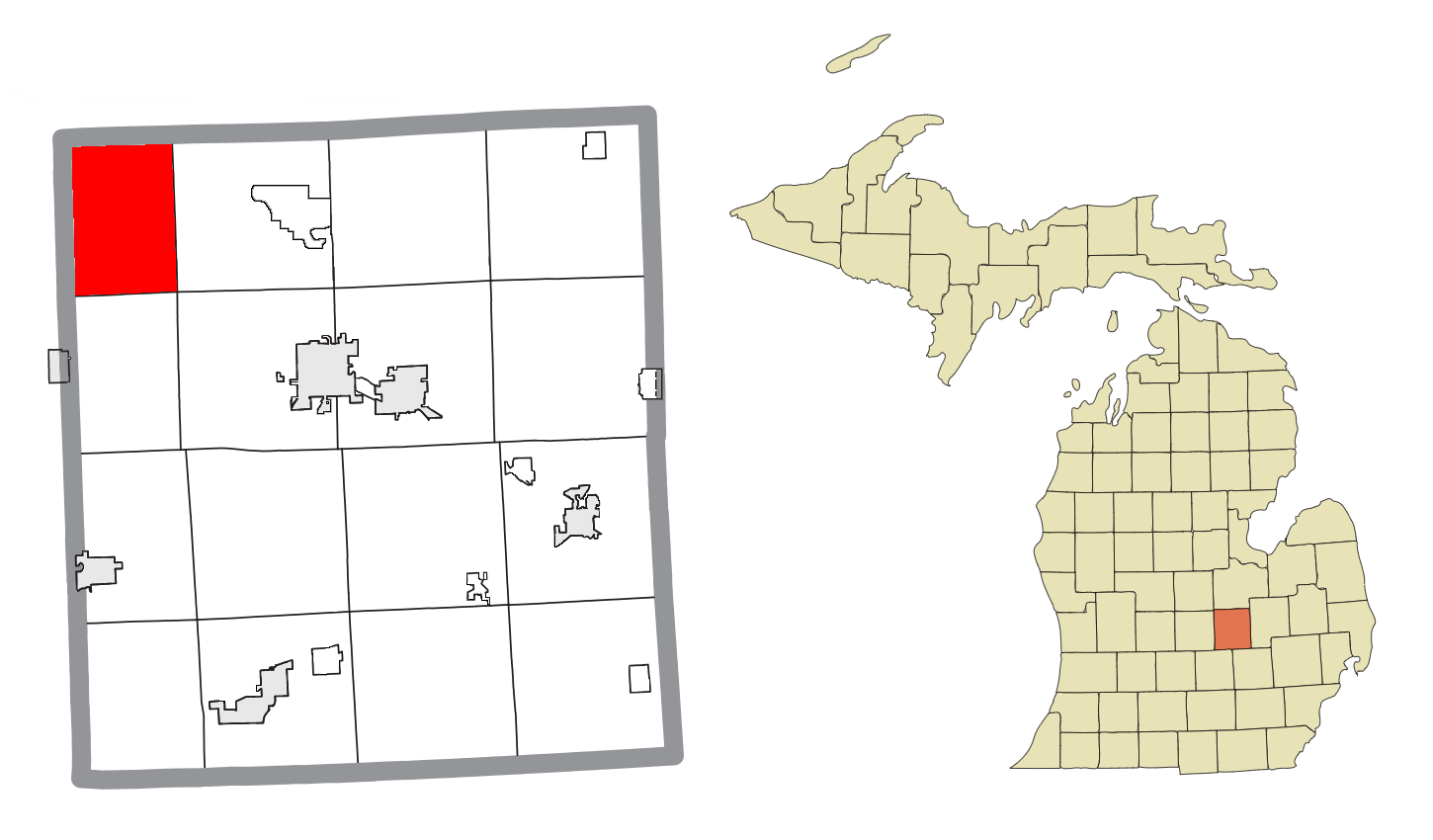
- Location within Shiawassee County

- Location within the state of Michigan Fairfield Township (the United States)
- Coordinates: 43°04′45″N 84°20′02″W
- Country: United States
- State: Michigan
- County: Shiawassee

Government
  - Supervisor: Richard Zemla
  - Clerk: Carolyn Long

Area
  - Total: 25.07 sq mi (64.9 km^{2})
  - Land: 25.06 sq mi (64.9 km^{2})
  - Water: 0.01 sq mi (0.026 km^{2})
- Elevation: 745 ft (227 m)

Population (2020)
  - Total: 652
  - Density: 26.0/sq mi (10.0/km^{2})
- Time zone: UTC-5 (Eastern (EST))
  - Summer (DST): UTC-4 (EDT)
- ZIP code(s): 48831 (Elsie); 48841 (Henderson)
- Area code: 989
- FIPS code: 26-27040
- GNIS feature ID: 1626264
- Website: Official website

Fairfield Township is a civil township of Shiawassee County in the U.S. state of Michigan. As of the 2020 census, the township population was 652.

== Communities ==
- Carland is an unincorporated community within the township at North Carland and Juddville roads with coordinates of 43°03′29″N 84°18′17″W. Carland was laid out in 1884 when the railroad was extended to that point.
- Hoovers Corners is an unincorporated community within the township at Allan and North Carland roads with coordinates of 43°06′01″N 84°18′20″W.
- Olney Corners is an unincorporated community within the township at Ridge and Warren roads with coordinates of 43°07′41″N 84°20′41″W at the border with Chapin Township, Saginaw County.

== Geography ==
According to the United States Census Bureau, the township has a total area of 25.07 square miles (64.93 km^{2}), of which 25.06 square miles (64.91 km^{2}) is land and 0.01 square miles (0.03 km^{2}) (0.04%) is water.

== Demographics ==
As of the census of 2000, there were 745 people, 272 households, and 205 families residing in the township. The population density was 29.7 inhabitants per square mile (11.5/km^{2}). There were 288 housing units at an average density of 11.5 per square mile (4.4/km^{2}). The racial makeup of the township was 99.06% White, 0.27% Asian, 0.13% Pacific Islander, and 0.54% from two or more races. Hispanic or Latino of any race were 0.94% of the population.

There were 272 households, out of which 35.3% had children under the age of 18 living with them, 64.7% were married couples living together, 6.6% had a female householder with no husband present, and 24.3% were non-families. 18.8% of all households were made up of individuals, and 7.0% had someone living alone who was 65 years of age or older. The average household size was 2.74 and the average family size was 3.14.

In the township the population was spread out, with 26.7% under the age of 18, 7.7% from 18 to 24, 29.1% from 25 to 44, 24.7% from 45 to 64, and 11.8% who were 65 years of age or older. The median age was 38 years. For every 100 females, there were 108.1 males. For every 100 females age 18 and over, there were 106.0 males.

The median income for a household in the township was $42,188, and the median income for a family was $44,375. Males had a median income of $32,240 versus $26,750 for females. The per capita income for the township was $16,327. About 6.7% of families and 10.2% of the population were below the poverty line, including 13.5% of those under age 18 and 2.8% of those age 65 or over.
