= M-21 (Michigan highway) =

State highway in Michigan, United States

M-21
- M-21 is highlighted in red

Route information
- Maintained by MDOT
- Length: 99.322 mi (159.843 km)
- Existed: c. July 1, 1919–present

Major junctions
- West end: M-37 in Grand Rapids
- I-96 in Grand Rapids; M-66 in Ionia; US 127 near St. Johns; M-52 in Owosso; M-13 near Lennon; I-75 / US 23 near Flint
- East end: I-475 in Flint

Location
- Country: United States
- State: Michigan
- Counties: Kent, Ionia, Clinton, Shiawassee, Genesee

Highway system
- Michigan State Trunkline Highway System; Interstate; US; State; Byways
← M-20	M-21, M-21A	→ M-22
← M-56	M-56	→ M-57

M-21 is an east–west state trunkline highway in the US state of Michigan connecting the cities of Grand Rapids and Flint. The highway passes through rural farming country and several small towns along its course through the Lower Peninsula. Following the course of a handful of rivers, M-21 also connects some of the state's freeways like Interstate 96 (I-96), US Highway 127 (US 127) and I-75. The highway is used by between 1,700 and 36,000 vehicles daily.

M-21 was designated along the highway by July 1, 1919 between Ionia and Goodells near Port Huron. Changes made in the 1920s extended it on the west end to Holland and on the east end to Port Huron. M-21 was truncated at both of its current termini as two Interstate freeways were completed. I-196 functionally replaced M-21 between Holland and Grand Rapids with a portion retained under state maintenance as Old M-21, now M-121. I-69 replaced M-21 from Flint to Port Huron. A section of M-21 through Flint became M-56. That designation was decommissioned in 1984 when M-21 was returned to its former routing in Flint.

== Route description ==
M-21 starts on Fulton Street at a junction with M-37 (East Beltline Avenue) on the east side of greater Grand Rapids. Fulton passes through residential areas on this side of town, and crosses over I-96. Continuing east, the highway passes the headquarters of Amway and crosses the Grand River near its confluence with the Thornapple River in Ada. M-21 runs long the north back of the Grand, turning southeasterly and east to Lowell. The roadway passes through downtown and over the Flat River near its confluence with the Grand. M-21 runs east of town through the southern end of the Lowell State Gaming Area and crosses into Ionia County.

The road follows Bluewater Highway along the river, passing to the north of Saranac. It turns northeasterly through lightly forested farmland passing Bertha Brock Park as it approaches the city of Ionia. In town, M-66 runs concurrently along M-21 for a few blocks in the central business district. Bluewater Highway leaves town and continues along the Grand River to Muir, and the trunkline crosses the Maple River on east side of town. M-21 follows the course of the Maple briefly before turning east through farms along the Stony Creek to Pewamo. The highway bypasses the village to the south and crosses into Clinton County near the eastern edge of town. Western Clinton County's landscape is dominated by farms, interrupted by the community of Fowler. The highway enters the county seat, St. Johns on State Street, passing through a residential section of town. In the middle of downtown, M-21 intersects 2nd Street, which carries Business US Highway 127 (Bus. US 127). East of downtown, M-21 passes back into agricultural land and under the US 127 freeway. The landscape is once again dominated by these farms through the western side of the county.

M-21 passes into the community of Ovid and over the county line into Shiawassee County. Continuing east through the county, the highway enters Owosso. The trunkline follows Main Street into downtown and crosses the Shiawassee River between junctions with M-52 and M-71 in Owosso. M-21 runs roughly parallel to the river out into the country side. The remainder of the county is the same, dominated by farmland along a straight stretch of flat highway. North of Lennon, M-21 meets M-13 at an intersection on the Shiawassee–Genesee county line. The landscape starts to transition to residential subdivisions as the roadway approaches the Flint area.

In Flint Township, M-21 follows Corunna Road and meets I-75/US 23 at exit 118. The road crosses a former branch line of the Canadian National Railway (converted into a bicycle trail) east of the interchange. Corunna Road angles to the northeast near Bradley Avenue and terminates at Court Street. The trunkline turns east and follows Court over a tributary of the Flint River near Aldrich Park. Northeast of the stream, M-21 splits along a one-way pairing of Court and 5th streets. Eastbound traffic follows 5th Street past the city and county buildings in the area. The highway passes over I-475 and terminates at the east frontage road. Traffic connecting between M-21 and I-475 must use the frontage roads to make the connection.

All of M-21, except for some segments just outside Grand Rapids and Flint, along with the highway split into two one-way streets inside Flint, is undivided surface road; none of M-21 is freeway. The section between I-75/US 23 and Saginaw Street in Flint is part of the National Highway System, a network of roadways important to the nation's economy, defense, and mobility. M-21, like all state highways, is maintained by the Michigan Department of Transportation (MDOT). As part of these responsibilities, the department tracks traffic volumes along its highways. They use a metric called average annual daily traffic (AADT), which is a calculation of the average traffic along a segment of roadway for any average day of the year. Traffic volumes in 2009 vary from 22,756 vehicles in the Forest Hills neighborhood east of Grand Rapids to 1,719 vehicles in Pewamo daily. MDOT reported that the peak AADT was 36,053 vehicles daily near the I-75 interchange in the Flint area.

== History ==
Before the Interstate era, M-21 extended across the entire Lower Peninsula, from the junction with US 31 in Holland near Lake Michigan east to the St. Clair River at Port Huron, and crossed into Canada where the Blue Water Bridge is currently located.

M-21 was designated by July 1, 1919 on a routing from Ionia to Goodells. Along the way, it ran through Lyons and Pewamo, joining its current routing to Ovid. M-21 continued through Corunna to Lennon and Flint. There it joined its last routing between Flint and the Port Huron area. The highway was extended to Port Huron by 1924, and the west end was extended to Grand Rapids in 1925 along M-16 (later US 16). The previous routing through Owosso and Lennon was redesignated as M-71 at this time when M-21 was shifted along the current routing between the two communities. The 1926 creation of the United States Highway System led to the extension of M-21 along US 16 to Grand Rapids. From there west, M-21 replaced M-51 on Chicago Drive to Holland. The highway was moved to a new routing between Flint and Lapeer in 1929; the old route was renumbered M-21A. All in-city portions of M-21 were transferred to state control in 1931 with the passage of the Dykstra Act of 1931 (PA 131 of 1931).

A Bypass M-21 (Byp. M-21) designation was created in the Grand Rapids area in 1945. This designation ran from the corner of 28th Street and Chicago Drive along Byp. US 16 and Byp. US 131 on 28th Street. At East Beltline Avenue, Byp. US 131/Byp. M-21 turned north back to M-21. M-21A in Flint was turned over to local control in 1948, decommissioning the number. The Byp. M-21 routing was replaced by M-21 in 1953. The former routing in Grand Rapids became Bus. M-21 instead.

A bypass of Zeeland opened in 1958, rerouting M-21 around the town. The I-196 freeway opened through Grand Rapids in 1964, and M-21 was routed along the freeway between Chicago Drive in Grandville and downtown, using I-96 to complete the connection to its previous routing on Fulton Street.

The first freeway segment of M-21 on the east end was built from Wadhams to Port Huron in 1966. A freeway segment between Flint and Lapeer opened in 1971. M-21 was routed down M-13 to the new freeway where it joined the M-78 designation from M-13 east. The section of M-21 formerly between M-13 and Bus. M-54 was redesignated M-56. The M-78 designation was replaced by I-69 in 1973 after I-69 was extended north from Charlotte. The 1974 completion of I-196 meant the truncation of M-21 to end in Grand Rapids. At the time, M-21 was extended along Fulton Street to the East Beltline, and the business loop was truncated into a spur route redesignated BS I-196. The remaining segment of freeway connecting Flint with Port Huron opened in 1984 as I-69, and M-21 was shortened to Flint. M-56 was replaced by M-21 at this time as well. The former M-21 in Port Huron became BL I-69, and the remainder was turned back to local control.

== Major intersections ==
County	Location	mi	km	Destinations	Notes
Kent	Grand Rapids Township	0.000	0.000	M-37 (East Beltline Avenue)	
Kent	Grand Rapids Township	0.610– 0.639	0.982– 1.028	I-96 west – Muskegon	Exit 39 on I-96; access to M-21 from eastbound I-96 and from M-21 to westbound I-96 only
Ionia	Ionia	27.867	44.848	M-66 north (State Street) – Lake City	Western end of M-66 concurrency
Ionia	Ionia	28.045	45.134	M-66 south (Dexter Street) – Battle Creek	Eastern end of M-66 concurrency
Clinton	St. Johns	55.249	88.915	Bus. US 127 (Whittemore Street) – Clare, Lansing	
Clinton	Bingham Township	56.871– 57.038	91.525– 91.794	US 127 – Clare, Lansing	Exit 96 on US 127
Shiawassee	Owosso	74.240	119.478	M-52 (Shiawassee Street) – Saginaw, Perry	
Shiawassee	Owosso	74.552	119.980	M-71 east (Water Street) – Corunna	Western terminus of M-71
Shiawassee–Genesee county line	Venice–Clayton township line	86.817	139.718	M-13 (Sheridan Road) – Saginaw, Lennon	
Genesee	Flint Township	95.895– 95.908	154.328– 154.349	I-75 / US 23 – Saginaw, Detroit, Ann Arbor	Exit 118 on I-75/US 23
Genesee	Flint	99.322	159.843	I-475 – Saginaw, Detroit	Roadway continues as Court Street
1.000 mi = 1.609 km; 1.000 km = 0.621 mi: Concurrency terminus; Incomplete access

== Related trunklines ==
=== M-21A ===
M-21A
- Location: Flint–Davison
- Length: 9.033 mi (14.537 km)
- Existed: 1929–Late 1948

M-21A was an alternate route for M-21 near Flint. It started at an intersection between M-21 (Court Street) and US 10 (Dort Highway) and ran southward concurrently with US 10 to Lapeer Road. The highway turned eastward along Lapeer Road and out of the city of Flint. It continued to an intersection with M-15 south of Davison, where it turned northward, running concurrently with M-15 into downtown. At an intersection with M-21 at Flint Street, M-21A ended. The highway was created in 1929, and it was turned over to local control in late 1948.

Major intersections
The entire highway was in Genesee County.

Location	mi	km	Destinations	Notes
Flint	0.000	0.000	US 10 west (Dort Highway) / M-21 east M-21 west (Court Street)	Northern end of US 10 concurrency
Flint	0.709	1.141	US 10 (Dort Highway) – Saginaw, Detroit; Lapeer Road	Southern end of US 10 concurrency; roadway continues westward as Lapeer Road
Davison Township	7.652	12.315	M-15 south Lapeer Road	Southern end of M-15 concurrency; roadway continues eastward as Lapeer Road
Davison	9.033	14.537	M-15 north – Bay City; M-21 (Flint Street) – Flint, Port Huron	Northern end of M-15 concurrency
1.000 mi = 1.609 km; 1.000 km = 0.621 mi: Concurrency terminus

=== Bypass M-21 ===
Bypass M-21
- Location: Kent County
- Length: 12.005 mi (19.320 km)
- Existed: By 1945–1953

Bypass M-21 (Byp. M-21) was a bypass route of M-21 in Kent County. It started at the intersection between M-21 (Chicago Drive) and 28th Street in Grandville. From there, it was routed eastward along 28th Street running concurrently with Byp. US 16. At the intersection with US 131 (Division Avenue) on the Wyoming–Paris township line, a Byp. US 131 started and ran concurrently eastward along 28th Street. Byp. US 16/Byp. US 131/Byp. M-21 continued along 28th Street in Paris Township to an intersection with Kalamazoo Avenue where M-37 turned off Kalamazoo and onto 28th Street. Further east, 28th Street and East Beltline Avenue intersected. At that junction, Byp. US 131/Byp. M-21 turned northward along East Beltline while M-37 turned south and Byp. US 16 continued eastward on 28th Street. Running northward in Grand Rapids Township, Byp. US 131/Byp. M-21 intersected US 16/M-50 at Cascade Road before Byp. M-21 terminated at the intersection with M-21 (Fulton Street).

During World War II, the state was building a beltline system for Grand Rapids. This highway, numbered M-114 was decommissioned by 1945 and the streets that composed it were given new designations. Byp. M-21 was routed along 28th Street from Grandville to Paris Township and along East Beltline into Grand Rapids Township. In 1953, the mainline M-21 was rerouted to replace its bypass around downtown, decommissioning the Byp. M-21 designation.

Major intersections
The entire highway was in Kent County.

Location	mi	km	Destinations	Notes
Grandville	0.000	0.000	M-21 (Chicago Drive) – Holland, Grand Rapids Byp. US 16 (28th Street) – Muskegon	Western end of Byp. US 16 concurrency
Wyoming–Paris township line	4.295	6.912	US 131 (Division Street) – Grand Rapids, Kalamazoo Byp. US 131 north	Western end of Byp. US 131 concurrency
Paris Township	6.219	10.009	M-37 north (Kalamazoo Avenue) – Grand Rapids	Western end of M-37 concurrency
Paris Township	8.483	13.652	Byp. US 16 east (28th Street) – Lansing M-37 south – Battle Creek	Eastern end of Byp. US 16 and M-37 concurrencies
Grand Rapids Township	11.572	18.623	US 16 / M-50 (Cascade Road) – Grand Rapids, Lansing	
Grand Rapids Township	12.005	19.320	M-21 (Fulton Street) – Grand Rapids, Flint Byp. US 131 north (East Beltline Avenue) – Cadillac	Northern end of Byp. US 131 concurrency
1.000 mi = 1.609 km; 1.000 km = 0.621 mi: Concurrency terminus

=== Business M-21 ===
Business M-21
- Location: Grandville–Grand Rapids
- Length: 6.749 mi (10.861 km)
- Existed: 1953–1974

Business M-21 (Bus. M-21) was a business route of M-21 in the Grand Rapids area. It started at an interchange between Chicago Drive and I-196/M-21 in Grandville and followed Chicago Drive easterly through downtown Grandville. From there, the highway ran along industrial areas on the north side of Wyoming, running parallel to the I-196 freeway. At the intersection with Clyde Park Avenue, Bus. M-21 turned northward along Grandville Avenue and entered the city of Grand Rapids. At Franklin Street, the business route turned eastward and terminated at US 131.

In 1953, M-21 was rerouted to replace its bypass route. The former route through downtown Grand Rapids was redesignated as Bus. M-21. At the time, Bus. M-21 continued eastward along Franklin Street before turning northward on Eastern Avenue into downtown Grand Rapids. Once there, it followed Fulton Street eastward through East Grand Rapids and into Grand Rapids Township where it terminated at East Beltline Avenue. The business loop was truncated to US 131 in 1972, and then redesignated as BS I-196 in 1974.

Major intersections
The entire highway was in Kent County.

Location	mi	km	Destinations	Notes
Grandville	0.000	0.000	I-196 / M-21 – Holland, Grand Rapids; Chicago Drive	Roadway continues westward on Chicago Drive as an unsigned state trunkline highway
Grandville	1.661	2.673	28th Street	Grade separation with a ramp from eastbound Chicago Drive to eastbound 28th Street; remaining connections are made via Wallace Avenue
Wyoming	3.126	5.031	I-196 / M-21 – Holland	Westbound exit to, and eastbound entrance from, I-196
Wyoming	5.437	8.750	Clyde Park Avenue	Eastern end of Chicago Drive and southern end of Grandville Avenue sections of Bus. M-21
Grand Rapids	6.740– 6.749	10.847– 10.861	US 131 – Grand Rapids, Kalamazoo	
1.000 mi = 1.609 km; 1.000 km = 0.621 mi: Incomplete access

=== M-56 ===
M-56
- Location: Genesee County
- Length: 12.726 mi (20.481 km)
- Existed: 1971–1984

M-56 was a state trunkline highway from 1971 to the mid-1980s that replaced the M-21 designation from M-13 to Flint when the M-21 (now I-69) freeway was being built. The highway started at the intersection with M-13 on the Shiawassee–Genesee county line west of Flint. From there, it followed Corunna Road eastward through rural areas of Genesee County. Today, the area is farm fields through Clayton Township, and in Flint Township it is more suburban. The highway intersected the I-75/US 10/US 23 freeway just west of Flint's city line. Once in Flint, M-56 turned northeasterly onto Court Street. At an intersection with Saginaw Street, the highway turned southeasterly and then ended at the I-69/M-21 freeway.

In 1971, M-21 was rerouted in the Flint area. After the change, it turned south along M-13 on the Shiawassee–Genesee county line to the M-78 freeway and then routed eastward to replace M-78. The former routing of M-21 on the western side of the county into downtown was redesignated M-56. When the M-21 designation was replaced with the I-69 designation in 1984, the M-56 designation was retired and M-21 was restored in its place.

Major intersections

County	Location	mi	km	Destinations	Notes
Shiawassee–Genesee county line	Venice–Clayton township line	0.000	0.000	M-13 / M-21 east – Saginaw, Lennon, Flint M-21 west – Grand Rapids	
Genesee	Flint Township	9.078– 9.091	14.610– 14.631	I-75 / US 10 / US 23 – Saginaw, Detroit, Ann Arbor	Exit 118 on I-75//US 10/US 23
Genesee	Flint	12.715– 12.726	20.463– 20.481	I-69 east / M-21 east – Lansing, Port Huron	Eastbound entrance to, and westbound exit from, I-69/M-21; other connections made through service drives
1.000 mi = 1.609 km; 1.000 km = 0.621 mi: Incomplete access
