= Corunna, Michigan =

- City
- City of Corunna
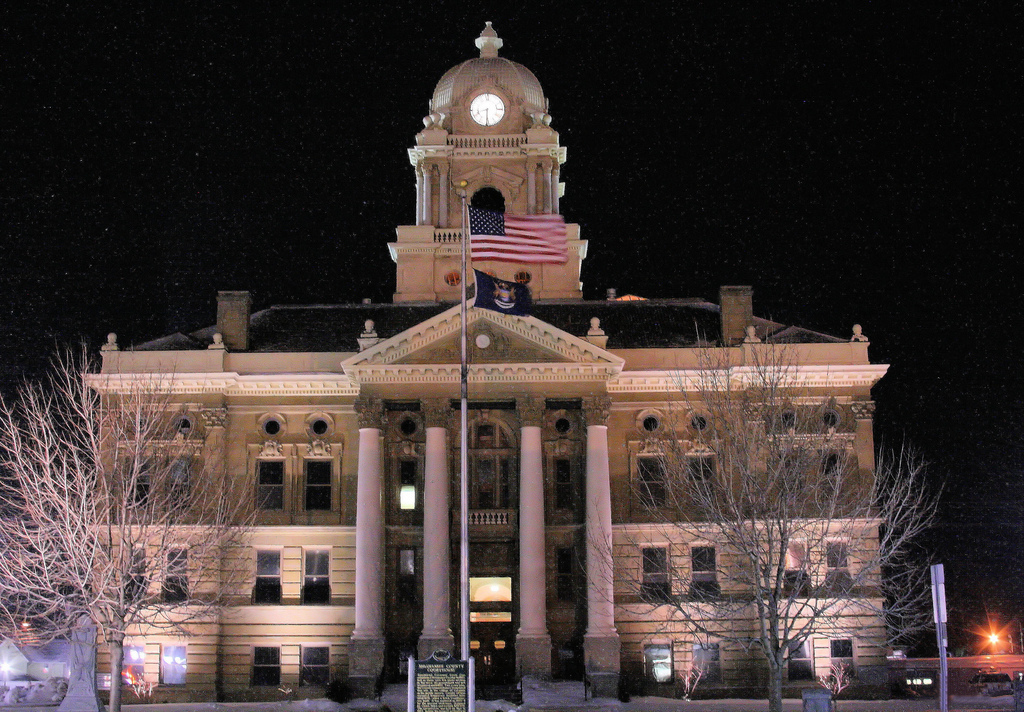
- Shiawassee County Courthouse

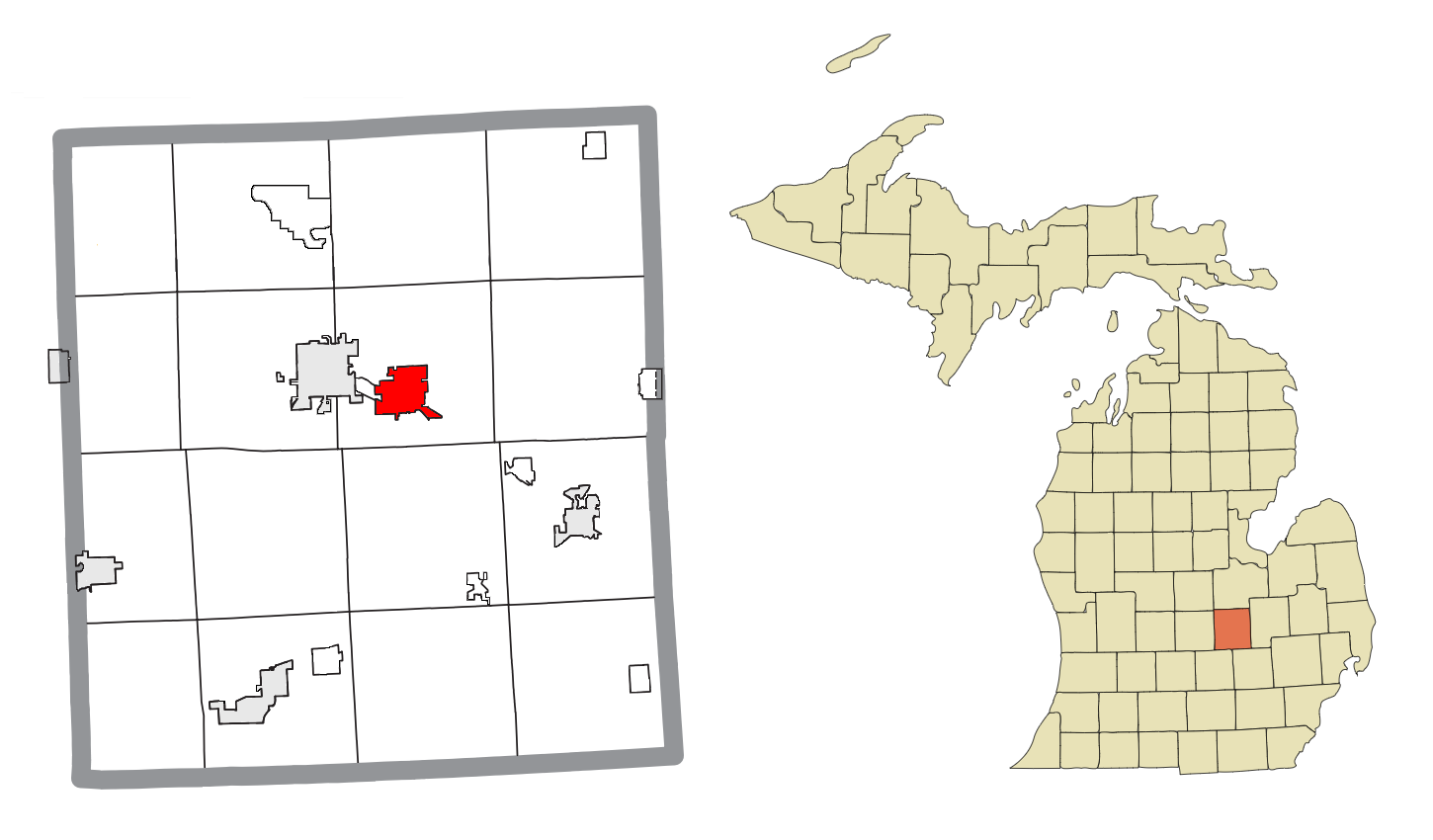
- Location within Shiawassee County

- Location within the state of Michigan Corunna (the United States)
- Coordinates: 42°59′01″N 84°06′58″W
- Country: United States
- State: Michigan
- County: Shiawassee
- Platted: 1837
- Incorporated: 1858 (village); 1869 (city)

Government
  - Type: Council–manager
  - Mayor: Charles Kerridge
  - Manager: Joe Sawyer

Area
  - Total: 3.25 sq mi (8.42 km^{2})
  - Land: 3.18 sq mi (8.24 km^{2})
  - Water: 0.069 sq mi (0.18 km^{2})
- Elevation: 742 ft (226 m)

Population (2020)
  - Total: 3,046
  - Density: 957.2/sq mi (369.56/km^{2})
- Time zone: UTC-5 (Eastern (EST))
  - Summer (DST): UTC-4 (EDT)
- ZIP code(s): 48817
- Area code: 989
- FIPS code: 26-18300
- GNIS feature ID: 1626134
- Website: Official website

Corunna (/kəˈrʌnə/ kə-RUN-ə) is a city in and the county seat of Shiawassee County in the U.S. state of Michigan. The population was 3,046 at the 2020 census. The city is surrounded by Caledonia Charter Township and is slightly east of the city of Owosso.

== History ==
Corunna was platted in 1837. It was made the county seat in 1840, incorporated as a village in 1858 and made a city in 1869. Andrew Parsons, tenth Michigan Governor (March 8, 1853 – January 3, 1855), was a longtime resident of Corunna. A historical marker commemorating Parsons in Corunna was erected in 1969.

The city's name comes from the city of A Coruña, in Galicia, northwestern Spain.

== Geography ==
According to the United States Census Bureau, the city has a total area of 3.26 square miles (8.44 km^{2}), of which 3.19 square miles (8.26 km^{2}) is land and 0.07 square miles (0.18 km^{2}) (2.15%) is water.

== Transportation ==
=== Highways ===
- M-21
- M-71

=== Airport ===
- Owosso Community Airport is located just northwest of the city in Caledonia Township.

== Demographics ==
Historical population
| Census | Pop. | Note | %± |
|---|---|---|---|
| 1860 | 684 | | — |
| 1870 | 1,408 | | 105.8% |
| 1880 | 1,501 | | 6.6% |
| 1890 | 1,382 | | −7.9% |
| 1900 | 1,510 | | 9.3% |
| 1910 | 1,384 | | −8.3% |
| 1920 | 1,571 | | 13.5% |
| 1930 | 1,936 | | 23.2% |
| 1940 | 2,017 | | 4.2% |
| 1950 | 2,358 | | 16.9% |
| 1960 | 2,764 | | 17.2% |
| 1970 | 2,829 | | 2.4% |
| 1980 | 3,206 | | 13.3% |
| 1990 | 3,091 | | −3.6% |
| 2000 | 3,381 | | 9.4% |
| 2010 | 3,497 | | 3.4% |
| 2020 | 3,046 | | −12.9% |
U.S. Decennial Census

=== 2020 census ===
As of the 2020 census, Corunna had a population of 3,046. The median age was 41.5 years. 19.7% of residents were under the age of 18 and 19.7% of residents were 65 years of age or older. For every 100 females there were 92.5 males, and for every 100 females age 18 and over there were 88.4 males age 18 and over.

98.1% of residents lived in urban areas, while 1.9% lived in rural areas.

There were 1,383 households in Corunna, of which 25.2% had children under the age of 18 living in them. Of all households, 33.6% were married-couple households, 22.1% were households with a male householder and no spouse or partner present, and 36.6% were households with a female householder and no spouse or partner present. About 40.2% of all households were made up of individuals and 18.3% had someone living alone who was 65 years of age or older.

There were 1,469 housing units, of which 5.9% were vacant. The homeowner vacancy rate was 1.9% and the rental vacancy rate was 4.8%.

Racial composition as of the 2020 census
| Race | Number | Percent |
|---|---|---|
| White | 2,782 | 91.3% |
| Black or African American | 11 | 0.4% |
| American Indian and Alaska Native | 17 | 0.6% |
| Asian | 15 | 0.5% |
| Native Hawaiian and Other Pacific Islander | 0 | 0.0% |
| Some other race | 23 | 0.8% |
| Two or more races | 198 | 6.5% |
| Hispanic or Latino (of any race) | 89 | 2.9% |

=== 2010 census ===
As of the census of 2010, there were 3,497 people, 1,384 households, and 851 families living in the city. The population density was 1,096.2 inhabitants per square mile (423.2/km^{2}). There were 1,519 housing units at an average density of 476.2 per square mile (183.9/km^{2}). The racial makeup of the city was 95.0% White, 1.2% African American, 0.4% Native American, 1.3% Asian, 0.6% from other races, and 1.5% from two or more races. Hispanic or Latino of any race were 2.4% of the population.

There were 1,384 households, of which 33.5% had children under the age of 18 living with them, 39.0% were married couples living together, 17.7% had a female householder with no husband present, 4.8% had a male householder with no wife present, and 38.5% were non-families. 32.0% of all households were made up of individuals, and 9.9% had someone living alone who was 65 years of age or older. The average household size was 2.34 and the average family size was 2.94.

The median age in the city was 36 years. 23.6% of residents were under the age of 18; 11.6% were between the ages of 18 and 24; 25.4% were from 25 to 44; 24.6% were from 45 to 64; and 14.7% were 65 years of age or older. The gender makeup of the city was 47.8% male and 52.2% female.

=== 2000 census ===
As of the census of 2000, there were 3,381 people, 1,320 households, and 819 families living in the city. The population density was 1,095.0 inhabitants per square mile (422.8/km^{2}). There were 1,407 housing units at an average density of 455.7 per square mile (175.9/km^{2}). The racial makeup of the city was 96.36% White, 1.06% African American, 0.65% Native American, 0.21% Asian, 0.56% from other races, and 1.15% from two or more races. Hispanic or Latino of any race were 2.54% of the population.

There were 1,320 households, out of which 32.3% had children under the age of 18 living with them, 43.4% were married couples living together, 14.1% had a female householder with no husband present, and 37.9% were non-families. 32.1% of all households were made up of individuals, and 11.7% had someone living alone who was 65 years of age or older. The average household size was 2.33 and the average family size was 2.94.

In the city, the population was spread out, with 23.0% under the age of 18, 12.8% from 18 to 24, 28.5% from 25 to 44, 19.8% from 45 to 64, and 15.9% who were 65 years of age or older. The median age was 35 years. For every 100 females, there were 93.5 males. For every 100 females age 18 and over, there were 88.4 males.

The median income for a household in the city was $29,831, and the median income for a family was $41,705. Males had a median income of $29,668 versus $22,875 for females. The per capita income for the city was $17,053. About 10.0% of families and 12.0% of the population were below the poverty line, including 14.1% of those under age 18 and 13.9% of those age 65 or over.

== Film ==
In 2005, filmmaker Bryan McGuire produced/directed/wrote a documentary chronicling what life in Corunna is like entitled Stay on the Tarvey. The film included interviews with current and former residents and explored topics such as race relations, family values and "hickdom".

== Schools ==
Elementary Schools:

- Corunna Public School
- Louise Peacock Elementary
- Elsa Meyer Elementary

Middle Schools:

- Corunna Middle School

High Schools:

- Corunna High School

== Notable people ==
- Tony Annese, American football coach
- Martha Arnold Boughton (1857–1928), educator, author
- Andrew Parsons, Michigan governor from 1853 to 1855
- Earl Rapp, pitcher for five Major League Baseball teams, member of Pacific Coast League Hall of Fame
