= Perry, Michigan =

- City
- City of Perry
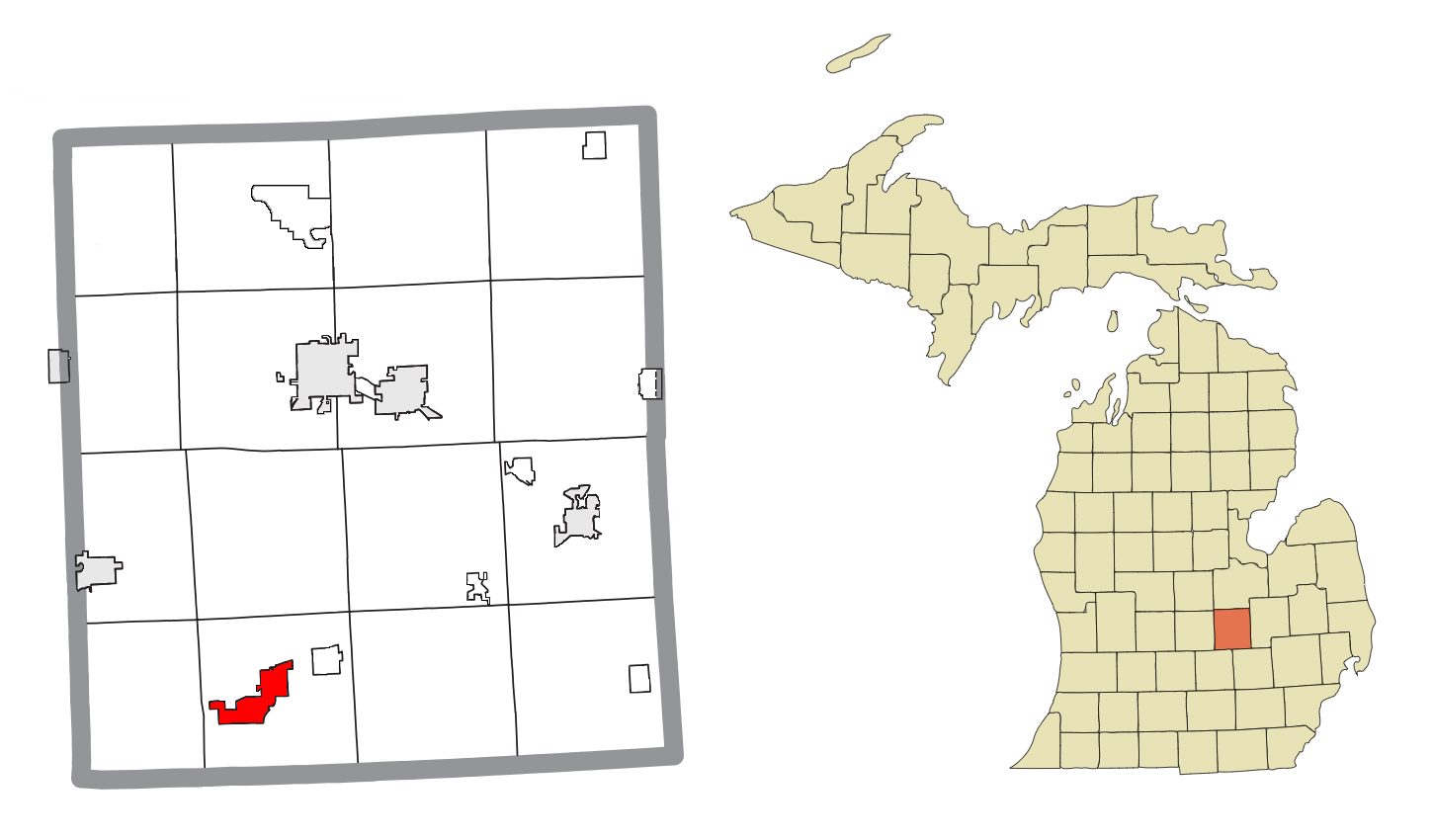
- Location within Shiawassee County

- Location within the state of Michigan
- Coordinates: 42°49′10″N 84°13′55″W
- Country: United States
- State: Michigan
- County: Shiawassee
- Incorporated: 1893 (village); 1964 (city)

Government
  - Type: Mayor–council
  - Mayor: Sue Hammond
  - Mayor Pro-Tem: Larry Lambert

Area
  - Total: 2.63 sq mi (6.80 km^{2})
  - Land: 2.52 sq mi (6.52 km^{2})
  - Water: 0.11 sq mi (0.28 km^{2})
- Elevation: 879 ft (268 m)

Population (2020)
  - Total: 2,091
  - Density: 831.0/sq mi (320.84/km^{2})
- Time zone: UTC-5 (Eastern (EST))
  - Summer (DST): UTC-4 (EDT)
- ZIP code(s): 48872
- Area code: 517
- FIPS code: 26-63700
- GNIS feature ID: 1626895
- Website: Official website

Perry is a city in Shiawassee County in the U.S. state of Michigan. The population was 2,091 at the 2020 census. The city is surrounded by Perry Township, but the two are administered autonomously.

== History ==
A post office has been in operation in Perry since 1850. The city was named for Oliver Hazard Perry, an American naval commander in the War of 1812. Perry was incorporated in 1893. Perry is also home to the Calkins-McQueen Museum, a home turned museum listed on the National Register of Historic Places. The Calkins-McQueen museum is currently preserved by the Perry Historical Society.

== Geography ==
According to the United States Census Bureau, the city has a total area of 3.17 square miles (8.21 km^{2}), of which 2.92 square miles (7.56 km^{2}) is land and 0.25 square miles (0.65 km^{2}) (7.89%) is water.

== Demographics ==
Historical population
Census	Pop.	Note	%±
1880	298		—
1890	440		47.7%
1900	641		45.7%
1910	720		12.3%
1920	734		1.9%
1930	835		13.8%
1940	879		5.3%
1950	1,203		36.9%
1960	1,370		13.9%
1970	1,531		11.8%
1980	2,051		34.0%
1990	2,163		5.5%
2000	2,065		−4.5%
2010	2,188		6.0%
2020	2,091		−4.4%
U.S. Decennial Census

=== 2020 census ===
As of the 2020 census, Perry had a population of 2,091. The median age was 36.6 years. 23.6% of residents were under the age of 18 and 14.7% of residents were 65 years of age or older. For every 100 females there were 93.6 males, and for every 100 females age 18 and over there were 94.5 males age 18 and over.

0.0% of residents lived in urban areas, while 100.0% lived in rural areas.

There were 836 households in Perry, of which 32.9% had children under the age of 18 living in them. Of all households, 45.7% were married-couple households, 18.3% were households with a male householder and no spouse or partner present, and 26.0% were households with a female householder and no spouse or partner present. About 28.2% of all households were made up of individuals and 12.2% had someone living alone who was 65 years of age or older.

There were 894 housing units, of which 6.5% were vacant. The homeowner vacancy rate was 1.7% and the rental vacancy rate was 6.6%.

Racial composition as of the 2020 census
Race	Number	Percent
White	1,914	91.5%
Black or African American	7	0.3%
American Indian and Alaska Native	7	0.3%
Asian	8	0.4%
Native Hawaiian and Other Pacific Islander	2	0.1%
Some other race	23	1.1%
Two or more races	130	6.2%
Hispanic or Latino (of any race)	46	2.2%

=== 2010 census ===
As of the census of 2010, there were 2,188 people, 823 households, and 584 families living in the city. The population density was 749.3 inhabitants per square mile (289.3/km^{2}). There were 902 housing units at an average density of 308.9 per square mile (119.3/km^{2}). The racial makeup of the city was 96.8% White, 0.3% African American, 0.4% Native American, 0.3% Asian, 0.1% Pacific Islander, 0.5% from other races, and 1.6% from two or more races. Hispanic or Latino of any race were 1.7% of the population.

There were 823 households, of which 39.0% had children under the age of 18 living with them, 51.0% were married couples living together, 14.7% had a female householder with no husband present, 5.2% had a male householder with no wife present, and 29.0% were non-families. 23.6% of all households were made up of individuals, and 6.5% had someone living alone who was 65 years of age or older. The average household size was 2.66 and the average family size was 3.12.

The median age in the city was 34.1 years. 27.7% of residents were under the age of 18; 8.6% were between the ages of 18 and 24; 29.9% were from 25 to 44; 24.8% were from 45 to 64; and 9% were 65 years of age or older. The gender makeup of the city was 48.3% male and 51.7% female.

=== 2000 census ===
As of the census of 2000, there were 2,065 people, 748 households, and 563 families living in the city. The population density was 724.1 inhabitants per square mile (279.6/km^{2}). There were 784 housing units at an average density of 274.9 per square mile (106.1/km^{2}). The racial makeup of the city was 97.82% White, 0.19% African American, 0.44% Native American, 0.39% Asian, 0.05% from other races, and 1.11% from two or more races. Hispanic or Latino of any race were 0.73% of the population.

There were 748 households, out of which 42.1% had children under the age of 18 living with them, 56.3% were married couples living together, 14.2% had a female householder with no husband present, and 24.7% were non-families. 21.7% of all households were made up of individuals, and 7.9% had someone living alone who was 65 years of age or older. The average household size was 2.73 and the average family size was 3.16.

In the city, the population was spread out, with 30.7% under the age of 18, 7.5% from 18 to 24, 32.6% from 25 to 44, 21.0% from 45 to 64, and 8.3% who were 65 years of age or older. The median age was 33 years. For every 100 females, there were 88.6 males. For every 100 females age 18 and over, there were 86.9 males.

The median income for a household in the city was $45,179, and the median income for a family was $48,977. Males had a median income of $38,587 versus $26,250 for females. The per capita income for the city was $16,769. About 3.4% of families and 5.7% of the population were below the poverty line, including 4.5% of those under age 18 and 18.5% of those age 65 or over.

== Highways ==
- I-69
- M-52

== Notable Person ==
- Alva M. Cummins (1869–1946), lawyer and 1922 Democratic nominee for Governor of Michigan
