= Corunna Public Schools =

School district in Michigan

Address
- 124 N Shiawassee Street Corunna, Shiawassee County, Michigan, 48817; United States

District information
- Grades: Pre-Kindergarten–12
- Established: 1842
- Superintendent: John Fattal
- Schools: 3
- Budget: $30,504,000 2022-2023 expenditures
- NCES District ID: 2610860

Students and staff
- Students: 1,564 (2024-2025)
- Teachers: 101.62 (on an FTE basis) (2024-2025)
- Staff: 233.81 FTE (2024-2025)
- Student–teacher ratio: 15.39 (2024-2025)

Other information
- Website: www.corunna.k12.mi.us

Corunna Public Schools is a public school district in Shiawassee County, Michigan. It serves Corunna, Vernon, and parts of the townships of Caledonia, Hazelton, New Haven, Shiawassee, Venice, and Vernon.

== History ==
Corunna's public school district was organized in 1842. A brick school building was built in 1851, and a second, larger school was built in 1866. Both were destroyed by fire in 1882 and replaced by a new building. This building also served as a high school. It was destroyed by fire on April 14, 1908.

Shiawassee Street School was built to replace it, opening in 1909. It served as Corunna High School until 1952 and as an elementary school between 1952 and 1976, when it became the district administration building. It also housed grades six through eight during the 1960s. It closed in 2014 and was redeveloped as apartments in 2016.

Between 1972 and 1976, overcrowding beset the district, and high school and junior high school students shared the high school building for half-day sessions.

The current high school opened in fall 1976, ending the overcrowding crisis. The former high school, built in 1952, (Note: The 1952–1953 yearbook features a picture of the then-new building, the present middle school, whereas the 1951–1952 yearbook showed only a picture of the former high school (Shiawassee Street School). 1952 is also the year Shiawassee Street School began housing a stand-alone elementary school, according to historic marker on the site.) became the district's middle school.

== Schools ==
Schools in Corunna Public Schools district
School	Address	Notes
Corunna High School	417 E King St., Corunna	Grades 8–12; built 1976
Corunna Middle School	400 N. Comstock Street, Corunna	Grades 4–7; built 1952
Elsa Meyer Elementary	100 S. Hastings Street, Corunna	Grades K–3
Louise Peacock Children's Services	485 E. McArthur Street, Corunna	Preschool / Early childhood
