= Durand Area Schools =

School district in Michigan, United States

Address
- 310 North Saginaw Street Durand, Shiawassee County, Michigan, 48429; United States

District information
- Grades: Pre-Kindergarten-12
- Superintendent: Shannon Knapp
- Schools: 4
- Budget: $28,542,000 2022-2023 expenditures
- NCES District ID: 2612330

Students and staff
- Students: 1,215 (2024-2025)
- Teachers: 77.2 (on an FTE basis) (2024-2025)
- Staff: 148.46 FTE (2024-2025)
- Student–teacher ratio: 15.74 (2024-2025)

Other information
- Website: www.durand.k12.mi.us

Durand Area Schools is a public school district in Central Michigan. In Shiawassee County, it serves Durand, Bancroft, and Lennon and parts of the townships of Antrim, Burns, Shiawassee, Venice, and Vernon. In Genesee County, it serves parts of the townships of Clayton and Gaines.

== History ==
The first public school in Durand was established in 1847, nine years before the first railroad came through the town. The first brick school was built in 1890 on the current site of Old Durand High School, and it contained all grades in the district, including the high school. South Side School was built in 1912 to house grades one through six.

As Durand prospered as a center for railroading, enrollment in the district grew. The high school graduated its largest class yet in 1919, but the school burned down that December. In its place, a new high school was built, opening in April 1921.

Robert Kerr Elementary opened in 1956 and additions were built in 1959. It was named after a long-serving school board member. In May 1961, the district's next new elementary school was named after Bertha Neal, principal of the high school since 1927. She retired in 1962.

The current high school opened in February 1965, designed by the Warren Holmes Company. The district was growing at that time due to consolidation with primary school districts in the outlying townships. The former high school then became Arthur Lucas Junior High School before being sold in 1999 and converted to senior housing. It was added to the National Register of Historic Places around 2009.

A bond issue to build a new Durand Middle School passed in June 1997. It opened in fall 1999.

In 2020, a bond issue passed to fund improvements to district facilities, including a new athletic center and auditorium at the high school.

== Schools ==
Schools in Durand Area Schools district
School	Address	Notes
Durand Area High School	9575 Monroe Road, Durand	Grades 9–12. Built 1965.
Durand Middle School	9550 E. Lansing Road, Durand	Grades 6–8. Built 1999.
Robert Kerr Elementary	9591 Monroe Road, Durand	Grades 2–5. Built 1956.
Bertha Neal Elementary	930 W. Main St., Durand	Grades PreK-1
Durand Online Academic Center		Alternative/online high school
