= Misteguay Creek =

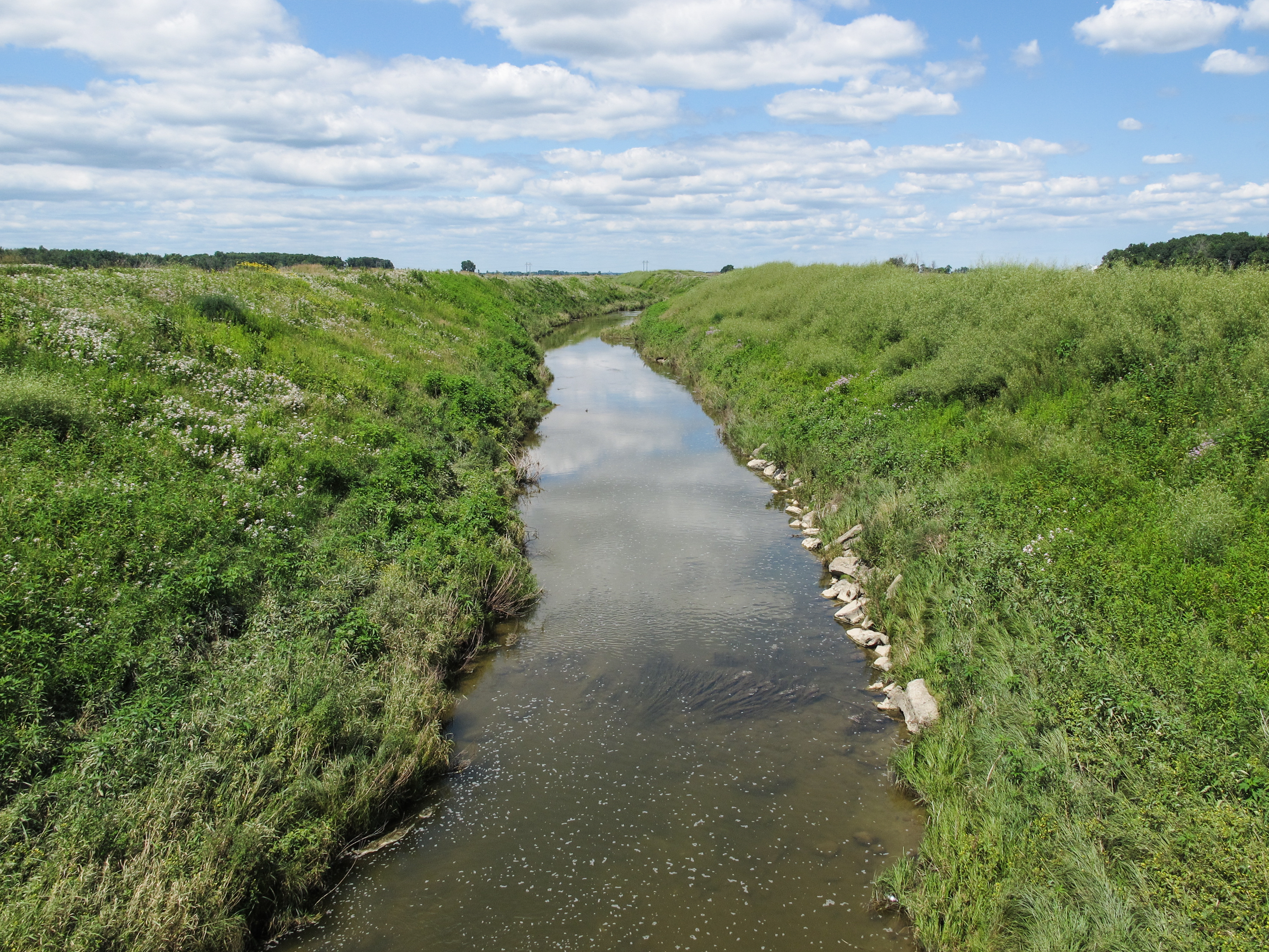
- A channelized section of Misteguay Creek in Albee Township

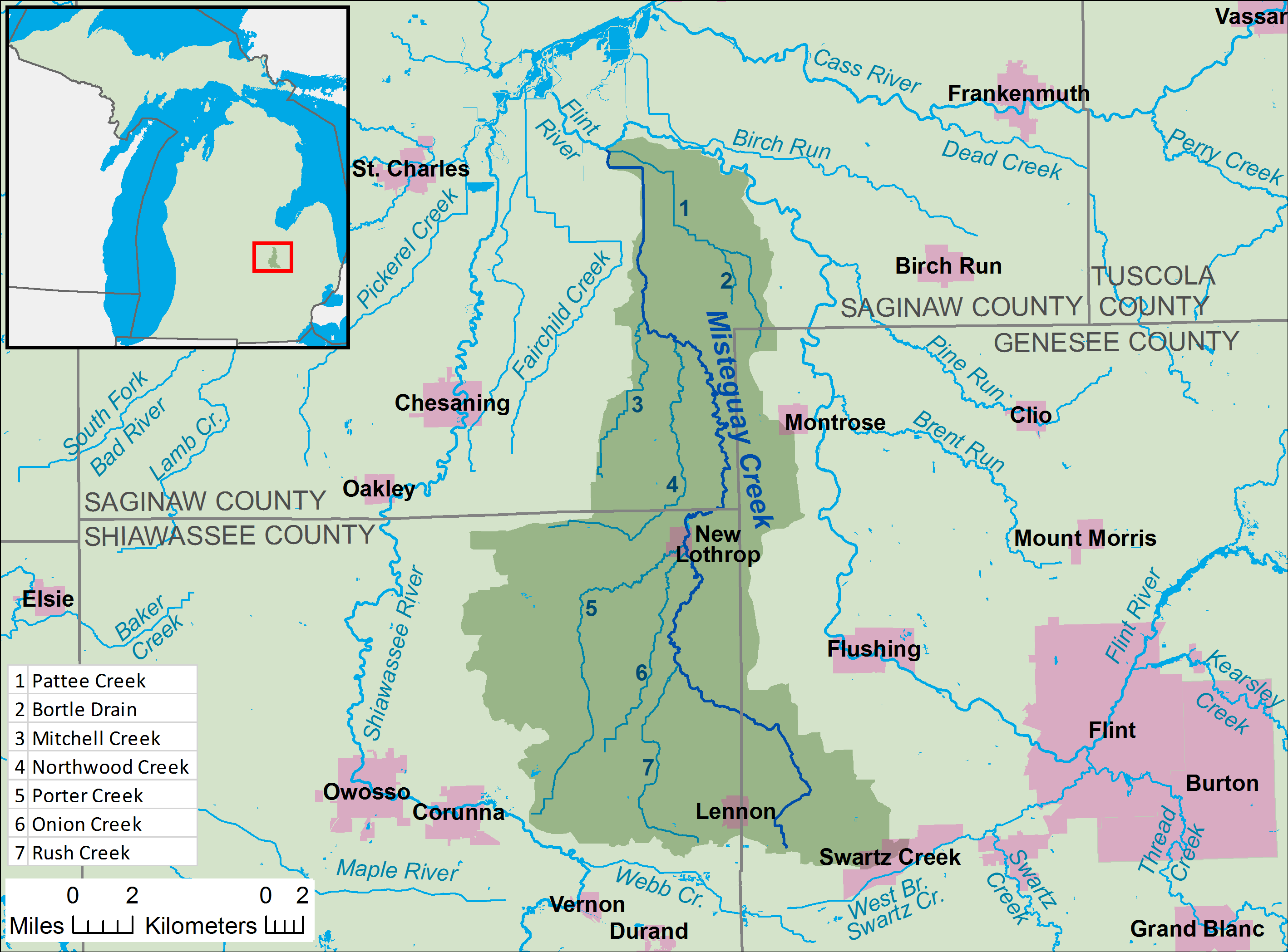
- A map of Misteguay Creek and its watershed.

Location
- Country: United States
- State: Michigan
- Counties: Genesee, Shiawassee, Saginaw
- Townships: Clayton, Venice, Hazelton, Maple Grove, Albee, Spaulding
- Municipality: New Lothrop

Physical characteristics
- Source
  - location: Clayton Township
  - coordinates: 42.9669737°N 83.8982942°W
  - elevation: 809 ft (247 m)
- Mouth: Flint River
  - location: Spaulding Township
  - coordinates: 43.3083596°N 84.0174739°W
  - elevation: 584 ft (178 m)
- Length: 38.4 mi (61.8 km)
- Basin size: 174.4 sq mi (452 km^{2})
- Discharge
  - location: mouth
  - average: 131.63 cu ft/s (3.727 m^{3}/s) (estimate)

Basin features
- Hydrologic Unit Codes: 040802040505, 040802040509, 040802040512, 040802040506, 040802040507, 040802040508 (USGS)

Misteguay Creek (/ˈmɪstəɡi/ MIST-ə-gee) is a tributary of the Flint River, 38.4 miles (61.8 km) long, on the central Lower Peninsula of Michigan in the United States. The stream drains an area of 174.4 square miles (452 km^{2}) in predominantly agricultural areas of the Flint/Tri-Cities region. Via the Flint and Shiawassee rivers, it is part of the watershed of the Saginaw River, which flows to Saginaw Bay of Lake Huron. Via Lake Huron and the Great Lakes system, it is part of the larger watershed of the St. Lawrence River.

Misteguay Creek begins in Clayton Township in Genesee County, approximately 1.9 miles (3.1 km) southeast of the village of Lennon and 3.5 miles (5.6 km) west of the city of Swartz Creek. It flows initially northwestward into Shiawassee County, then generally northward, through Venice and Hazelton townships and the village of New Lothrop in Shiawassee County; and Maple Grove, Albee, and Spaulding townships in Saginaw County. It flows into the Flint River in Spaulding Township, approximately 6.3 miles (10.1 km) east of the village of St. Charles. Several sections of the creek's course have been channelized.

== Tributaries ==
This is a list of named streams in Misteguay Creek's watershed, as identified by the National Hydrography Dataset. By default, the list is ordered from the mouth of the creek to its source.

	Name	Flows into	Length
1	Pattee Creek	Misteguay Creek	10.7 miles (17.2 km)
2	Bortle Drain	Pattee Creek	2.1 miles (3.4 km)
3	Mitchell Creek	Misteguay Creek	7.7 miles (12.4 km)
4	Northwood Creek	Misteguay Creek	11.3 miles (18.2 km)
5	Porter Creek	Misteguay Creek	14.6 miles (23.5 km)
6	Onion Creek	Misteguay Creek	9.2 miles (14.8 km)
7	Rush Creek	Misteguay Creek	9.1 miles (14.6 km)

== See also ==
- List of rivers of Michigan
