= Gaines Township, Michigan =

Gaines Township is the name of some places in the U.S. state of Michigan:

- Gaines Township, Genesee County, Michigan
- Gaines Township, Kent County, Michigan (also known as Gaines Charter Township, Michigan)

== See also ==
- Gaines, Michigan
