= Detroit Race Course =

Sports complex in Livonia, Michigan

Coordinates: 42°22′48″N 83°19′22″W

The Detroit Race Course was a complex in Livonia, Michigan, a suburb northwest of Detroit and part of the metropolitan area. It consisted of a regulation racing track and associated stables for horses, and facilities for trainers, exercise workers, and jockeys. It was opened in 1950 primarily as a venue for racing thoroughbreds. The track owners also leased the complex to Wolverine Raceway for Standardbred harness racing events. The large complex had stables with a capacity for 1200 horses.

== History ==
Until the late 1980s, the Detroit Race Course (DRC) and others, with its racetrack betting, were the only sites in Michigan for legalized gambling. In this period, efforts to introduce other types of gambling at the DRC were unsuccessful. Interest in horse racing declined in the late 20th century. In 1985 the business was sold to Ladbroke, a UK-based hotel and gambling company. It discontinued harness racing that year.

The DRC and gaming environment was adversely affected by the opening in 1994 of Casino Windsor across the river in Ontario, Canada. The casino was owned by the province and was a rousing success, attracting millions of visitors annually, many from the Midwest. The complex is owned by Ontario Lottery and Gaming Corporation of the provincial government. Following a major expansion in 2008, it is now known as Caesars Windsor.

In response, in 1996 the Michigan state legislature and governor passed a law to establish gaming in the state, beginning with casinos to be constructed in Detroit, the largest city and across from Windsor. Two casinos opened in 1999 and the third in 2000. They were intended in part to help generate revenues for the city of Detroit, which had struggled financially.

The last horse races on the flat at DRC were run in 1998. In May 1998 Ladbroke announced the sale of Detroit Race Course. Based on the new 1996 law, which authorized betting at tracks for simulcast events, Millennium, the new owners, used the complex as a venue for viewing simulcast video racing, with associated betting, into 1999. Attempts failed to gain voter approval for expanded forms of gaming at racetracks, such as slot machines. That summer Millennium demolished the facilities to redevelop the property for commercial uses.

As noted, the legislature in 1996 approved casinos in the state. Three have opened in Detroit: the MGM Grand Detroit and MotorCity Casino in 1999, and Greektown Casino-Hotel in 2000. In addition, by 2019 there were two dozen casinos elsewhere in the state owned and operated by federally recognized Native American tribes.

Thoroughbred racing was reintroduced at Hazel Park Raceway in 2014 after 30 years. Harness racing continued at other sites in the state, and now, one last harness racing facility operates, Northville Downs at Northville, Michigan. Sports Creek Raceway, a harness racing track near Swartz Creek, Michigan, operated from 1986 to 2015. Northville Downs was torn down in 2024 to make way for residential and commercial facilities.
