= Maple Grove Township, Saginaw County, Michigan =

Maple Grove Township, Michigan
- Civil township
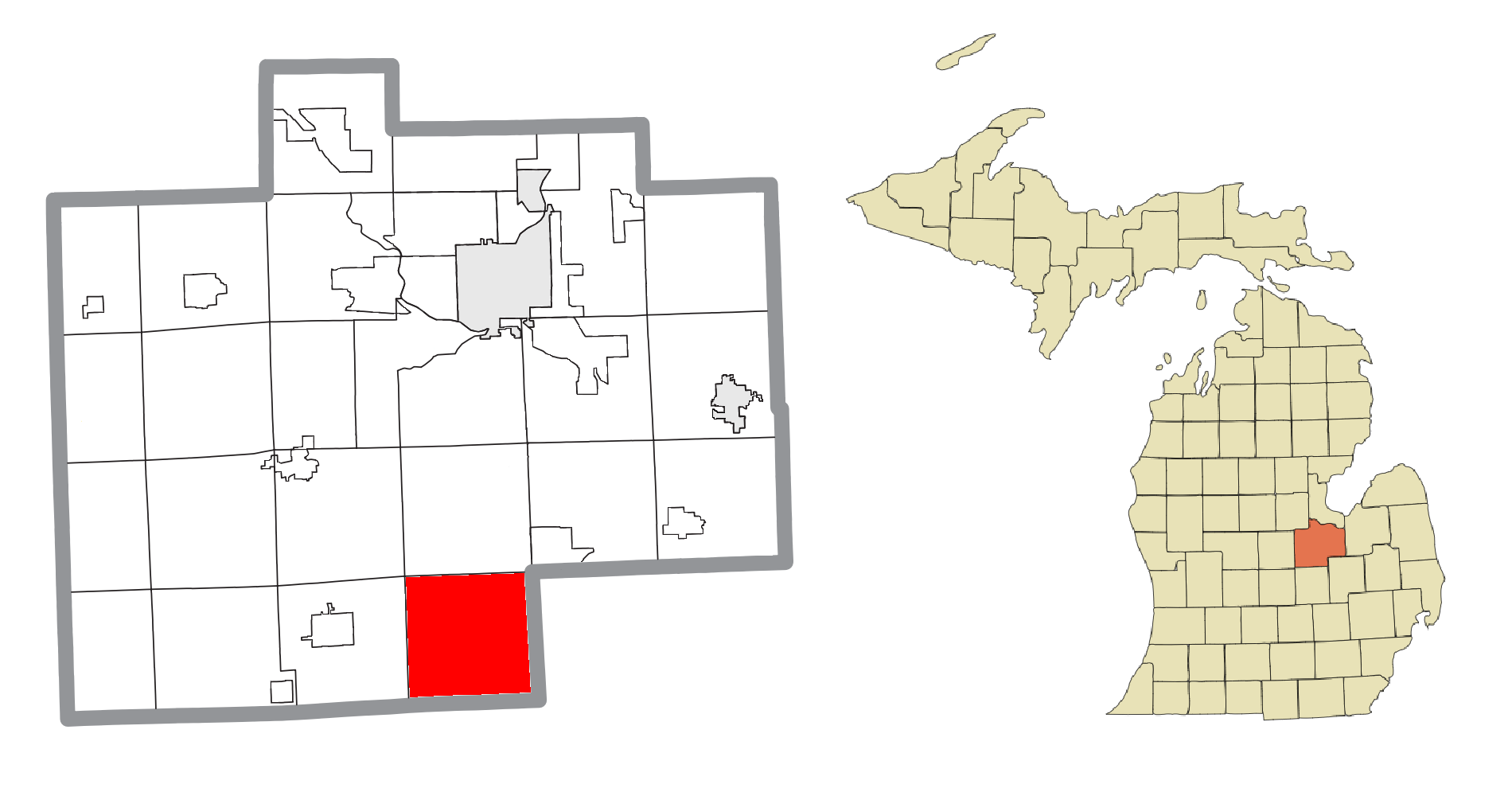
- Location within Saginaw County

- Location within the state of Michigan Maple Grove Township (the United States)
- Coordinates: 43°10′55″N 83°58′20″W
- Country: United States
- State: Michigan
- County: Saginaw

Government
  - Supervisor: Kevin Krupp
  - Clerk: Tish Yaros

Area
  - Total: 36.7 sq mi (95.0 km^{2})
  - Land: 35.6 sq mi (92.3 km^{2})
  - Water: 1.0 sq mi (2.7 km^{2})
- Elevation: 666 ft (203 m)

Population (2020)
  - Total: 2,676
  - Density: 75.1/sq mi (29.0/km^{2})
- Time zone: UTC-5 (Eastern (EST))
  - Summer (DST): UTC-4 (EDT)
- ZIP code(s): 48457 (Montrose); 48460 (New Lothrop); 48616 (Chesaning)
- Area code: 989
- FIPS code: 26-51060
- GNIS feature ID: 1626676
- Website: Official website

Maple Grove Township is a civil township of Saginaw County in the U.S. state of Michigan. The population was 2,676 at the 2020 Census.

== Communities ==
- Layton Corners is an unincorporated community in the township at M-57/Peet Road and Lincoln Road. A post office operated from May 16, 1878, until August 31, 1907.

== Geography ==
According to the United States Census Bureau, the township has a total area of 36.7 square miles (95.0 km^{2}), of which 35.6 square miles (92.3 km^{2}) is land and 1.0 square mile (2.7 km^{2}) (2.81%) is water. Misteguay Creek flows northward through the eastern part of the township.

== Demographics ==
As of the census of 2000, there were 2,640 people, 946 households, and 761 families residing in the township. The population density was 74.1 inhabitants per square mile (28.6/km^{2}). There were 967 housing units at an average density of 27.1 per square mile (10.5/km^{2}). The racial makeup of the township was 97.54% White, 0.87% African American, 0.23% Native American, 0.08% Asian, 0.68% from other races, and 0.61% from two or more races. Hispanic or Latino of any race were 1.48% of the population.

There were 946 households, out of which 33.9% had children under the age of 18 living with them, 71.7% were married couples living together, 5.0% had a female householder with no husband present, and 19.5% were non-families. 15.3% of all households were made up of individuals, and 6.4% had someone living alone who was 65 years of age or older. The average household size was 2.75 and the average family size was 3.06.

In the township the population was spread out, with 24.7% under the age of 18, 8.3% from 18 to 24, 27.9% from 25 to 44, 28.0% from 45 to 64, and 11.2% who were 65 years of age or older. The median age was 38 years. For every 100 females, there were 103.9 males. For every 100 females age 18 and over, there were 103.3 males.

The median income for a household in the township was $56,111, and the median income for a family was $61,296. Males had a median income of $50,435 versus $26,488 for females. The per capita income for the township was $24,506. About 4.4% of families and 6.7% of the population were below the poverty line, including 9.8% of those under age 18 and 8.4% of those age 65 or over.
