= Swartz Creek =

Coordinates: 43°00′55″N 83°41′58″W

Location
- Country: US

Physical characteristics
- Source
  - location: East: Holly State Recreation Area; West: Gaines Township
- Mouth
  - location: Thread Creek, Flint
- Length: 34 mi (55 km)
- Basin size: Saginaw River watershed

Swartz Creek is a 33.9-mile-long (54.6 km) creek located in the Mid Michigan area in the United States. It is a tributary of the Flint River and has two branches, the East and West Branch. Its name comes from the German word Schwarz, meaning "black", as the creek water is muddy.

== Description ==
The east branch originates at a number of lakes at Holly State Recreation Area in Holly Township in Oakland County. It then flows through a number of small lakes in Fenton Township, taking a turn northwards to flow through Mundy Township, and finally heading along the west side of Bishop International Airport to join up with the west branch of the creek just north of Interstate 69 near the Bristol Road on-ramps. It then continues northeast through the city of Flint until it empties into the Flint River.

The west branch begins directly southwest of the city of Swartz Creek in Gaines Township. It then flows northeast through the city and then through Flint Township, where it meets the eastern branch at Bristol Road and I-69. The previous "head waters" was a swamp called "Gaines' Dead Marsh", or "Dead Man's Swamp", which was drained by Henry Howland Crapo for farm land. This swamp was the source of the muddy water that gave the creek its name.

== Tributaries ==
- East Branch

- Indian Creek – joins up at Cook Road East of US-23

- Dawe Creek – join up with Indian Creek South of Cook Road East of Torrey Road

- Seaver Drain – joins up at Cook Road West of Fenton Road
- Brewer Drain - joins up between Brewer Road and US-23, South of Reid Road and North of Grand Blanc Road

- West Branch

- Hewitt Drain – joins up east of the Bristol Road on ramps

- Howland Drain – meets Hewitt Drain just North of Maple Road between Linden Road and Jennings Road

- Kimball Drain – meets up just North of the Railroad along the City of Swartz Creek's Southern border.

- Lum Drain – meets up with Kimball Drain Northeast of Morrish and Reid Roads

== See also ==
- West Second Street–Swartz Creek Bridge
