= Newburg, Michigan =

Newburg is the name of two places in the U.S. state of Michigan:

- Newburg, Lenawee County, Michigan:
- Newburg, Shiawassee County, Michigan
