= Vernon Township, Shiawassee County, Michigan =

Vernon Township, Michigan
- Civil township
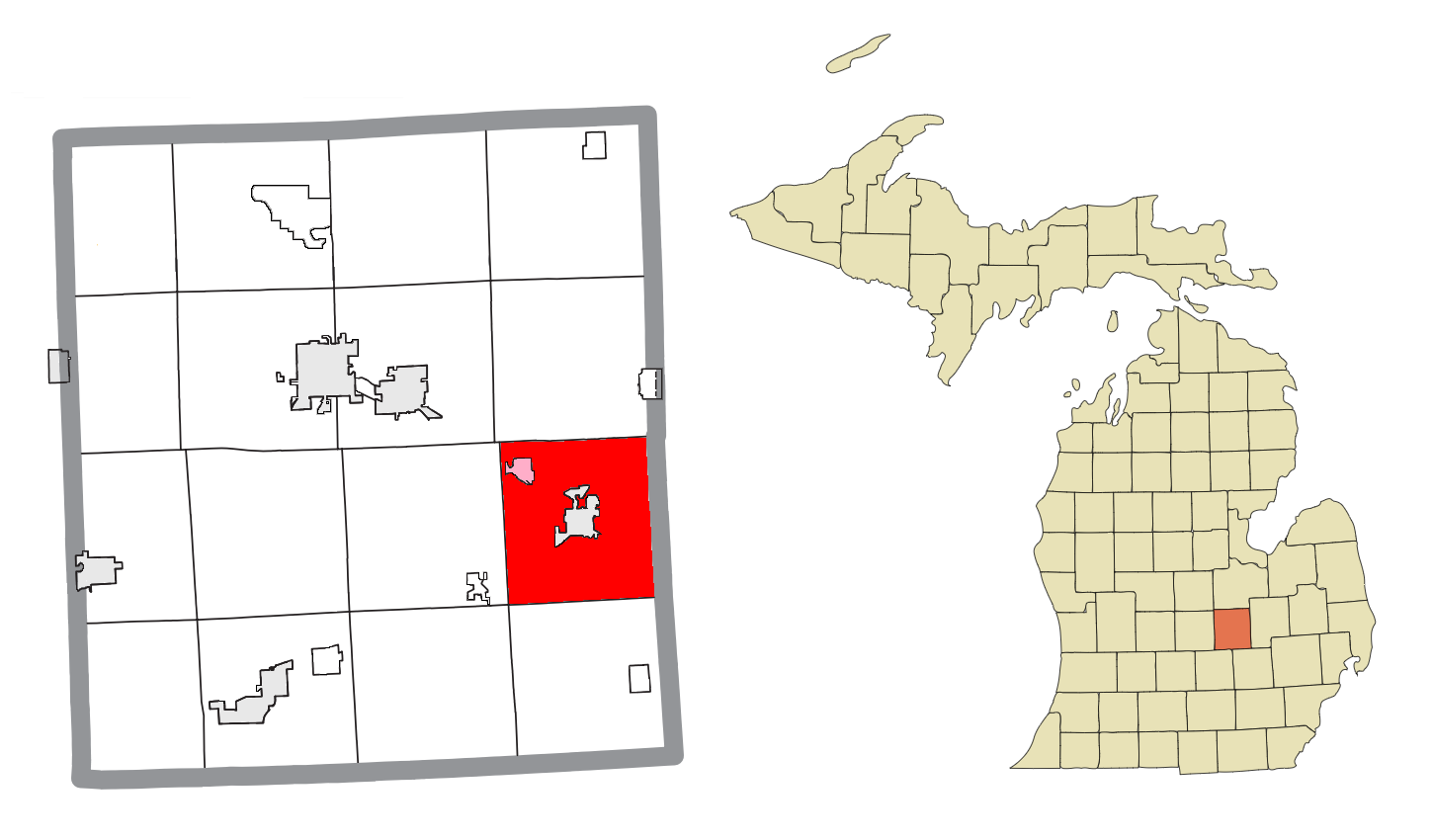
- Location within Shiawassee County (red) and the administered village of Vernon (pink)

- Location within the state of Michigan Vernon Township (the United States)
- Coordinates: 42°55′21″N 83°59′33″W
- Country: United States
- State: Michigan
- County: Shiawassee

Government
  - Supervisor: Bert DeClerg
  - Clerk: Susan Bannister

Area
  - Total: 34.03 sq mi (88.1 km^{2})
  - Land: 33.69 sq mi (87.3 km^{2})
  - Water: 0.34 sq mi (0.88 km^{2})
- Elevation: 790 ft (240 m)

Population (2020)
  - Total: 4,273
  - Density: 126.8/sq mi (48.97/km^{2})
- Time zone: UTC-5 (Eastern (EST))
  - Summer (DST): UTC-4 (EDT)
- ZIP code(s): 48414 (Bancroft); 48429 (Durand); 48436 (Gaines); 48476 (Vernon)
- Area code: 989
- FIPS code: 26-82040
- GNIS feature ID: 1627196
- Website: Official website

Vernon Township is a civil township of Shiawassee County in the U.S. state of Michigan. The population was 4,273 at the 2020 census. The village of Vernon is located within the township. The township also surrounds the city of Durand, but the two are administered autonomously.

Vernon Township was named after Mount Vernon, the estate of George Washington.

== Geography ==
According to the United States Census Bureau, the township has a total area of 34.03 square miles (88.1 km^{2}), of which 33.69 square miles (87.3 km^{2}) is land and 0.34 square miles (0.88 km^{2}) (1.00%) is water.

== Demographics ==
As of the census of 2000, there were 4,980 people, 1,881 households, and 1,470 families residing in the township. The population density was 146.9 inhabitants per square mile (56.7/km^{2}). There were 2,782 housing units at an average density of 82.1 per square mile (31.7/km^{2}). The racial makeup of the township was 97.45% White, 0.12% African American, 0.50% Native American, 0.18% Asian, 0.52% from other races, and 1.22% from two or more races. Hispanic or Latino of any race were 1.79% of the population.

There were 1,881 households, out of which 35.1% had children under the age of 18 living with them, 62.8% were married couples living together, 10.1% had a female householder with no husband present, and 21.8% were non-families. 17.5% of all households were made up of individuals, and 7.0% had someone living alone who was 65 years of age or older. The average household size was 2.65 and the average family size was 2.97.

In the township the population was spread out, with 26.1% under the age of 18, 7.8% from 18 to 24, 28.4% from 25 to 44, 26.3% from 45 to 64, and 11.4% who were 65 years of age or older. The median age was 37 years. For every 100 females, there were 99.4 males. For every 100 females age 18 and over, there were 98.0 males.

The median income for a household in the township was $47,339, and the median income for a family was $53,068. Males had a median income of $43,600 versus $26,760 for females. The per capita income for the township was $18,990. About 5.7% of families and 7.2% of the population were below the poverty line, including 8.5% of those under age 18 and 6.6% of those age 65 or over.

== Highways ==
- I-69
- M-71
