= Hazelton Township, Michigan =

- Civil township
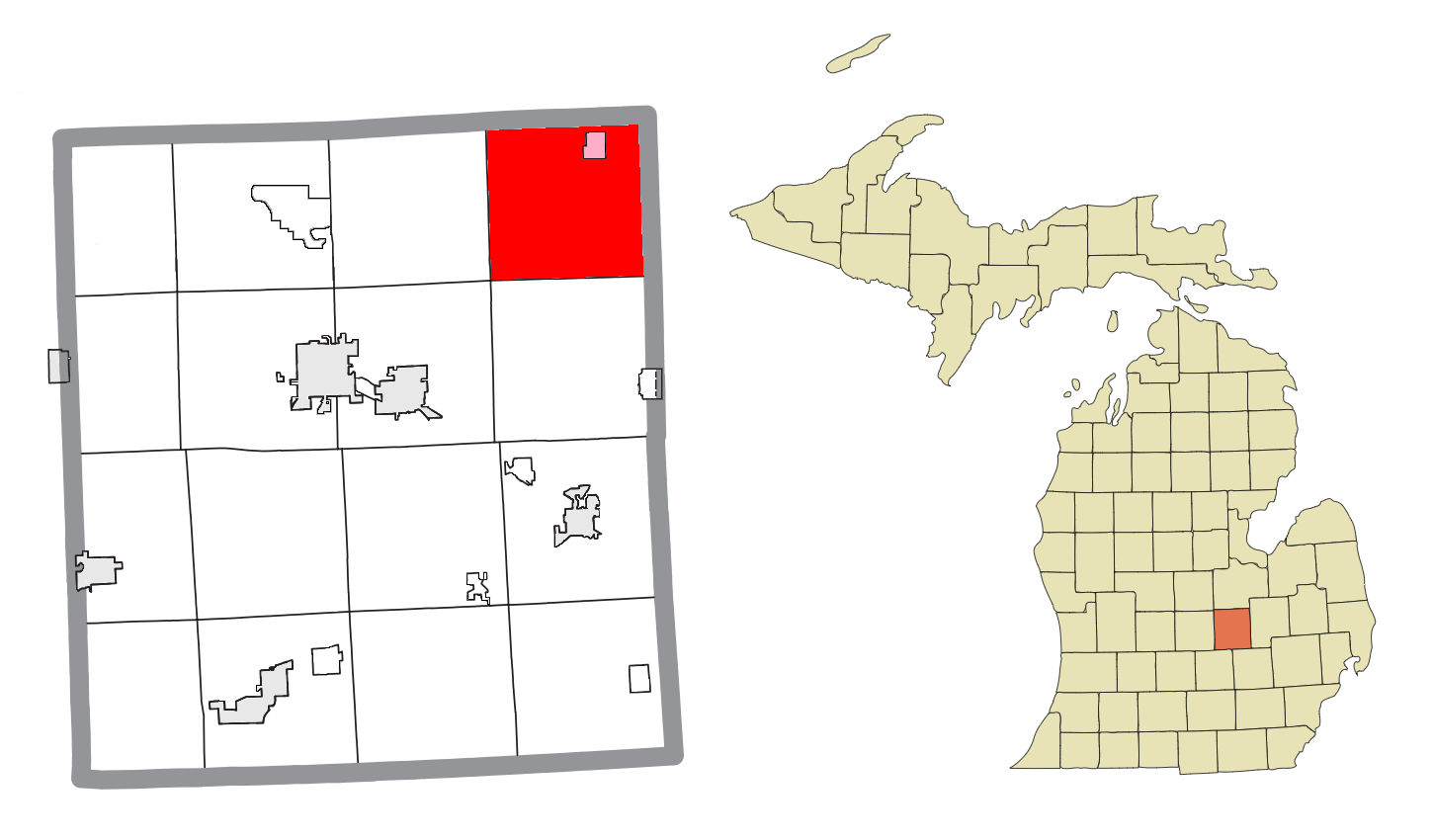
- Location within Shiawassee County (red) and the administered village of New Lothrop (pink)

- Location within the state of Michigan Hazelton Township (the United States)
- Coordinates: 43°05′32″N 83°58′55″W
- Country: United States
- State: Michigan
- County: Shiawassee

Government
  - Supervisor: James Sheridan
  - Clerk: Kerry Kruske

Area
  - Total: 37.33 sq mi (96.7 km^{2})
  - Land: 37.29 sq mi (96.6 km^{2})
  - Water: 0.04 sq mi (0.10 km^{2})
- Elevation: 715 ft (218 m)

Population (2020)
  - Total: 2,054
  - Density: 55.08/sq mi (21.27/km^{2})
- Time zone: UTC-5 (Eastern (EST))
  - Summer (DST): UTC-4 (EDT)
- ZIP code(s): 48433 (Flushing); 48449 (Lennon); 48460 (New Lothrop); 48817 (Corunna)
- Area code: 810
- FIPS code: 26-37440
- GNIS feature ID: 1626458
- Website: Official website

Hazelton Township is a civil township of Shiawassee County, Michigan, United States. The population was 2,054 at the 2020 census.

== Communities ==
- Hazelton is a small, historical settlement originally known as "Ratville" located near the center of the township at the junction of New Lothrop Road and Henderson Road at 43°05′11.53″N 83°58′5.23″W. By 1863, Hazelton had 400 residents supported by an agricultural economy, with a post office, general store and three churches. The village lost its post office as its population declined in 1902.
- Juddville is a small, historical settlement in the southern part of the township, at the junction of Durand and Juddville Roads at 43°03′31″N 83°59′15″W. The community is named for the family of Connecticut native John Judd, who bought 400 acres (1,600,000 m^{2}) of land here in 1853 from the Hazelton brothers. After moving here with his wife Matilda, they cleared land and in 1854 built a log schoolhouse in which their eldest daughter Jane was the first teacher. In June 1879, a post office named "Judd's Corners" was established for the community. By 1881, there was a sawmill, blacksmith shop, general store, a creamery, and two churches. Population peaked in the 1880s at approximately 175 people and began to decline and the post office was closed in September 1902. A schoolhouse built in 1903 is commemorated with a historical marker.
- New Lothrop is a village in the northeast part of the township.

== History ==
Relatives Stanton Latham and E.E. Fowls arrived in the township in 1848. Hazelton and the settlement were named after brothers George, Edgar and Porter Hazelton, who, with Ezekial Ewing constructed a bridge across the Flint River for the State of Michigan. With no money to pay them in 1849, they received most of the current township land, which they proceeded to sell to settlers.

== Geography ==
According to the United States Census Bureau, the township has a total area of 37.33 square miles (96.68 km^{2}), of which 37.29 square miles (96.58 km^{2}) is land and 0.04 square miles (0.10 km^{2}) (0.11%) is water.

Misteguay Creek flows northward through the eastern part of the township.

== Demographics ==
At the 2000 census, there were 2,206 people, 805 households and 648 families residing in the township. The population density was 59.2 inhabitants per square mile (22.9/km^{2}). There were 849 housing units at an average density of 22.8 per square mile (8.8/km^{2}). The racial makeup of the township was 98.14% White, 0.63% Native American, 0.23% from other races, and 1.00% from two or more races. Hispanic or Latino of any race were 0.91% of the population.

There were 805 households, of which 36.0% had children under the age of 18 living with them, 70.8% were married couples living together, 7.6% had a female householder with no husband present, and 19.4% were non-families. 17.6% of all households were made up of individuals, and 6.6% had someone living alone who was 65 years of age or older. The average household size was 2.73 and the average family size was 3.08.

26.7% of the population were under the age of 18, 7.4% from 18 to 24, 27.7% from 25 to 44, 27.3% from 45 to 64, and 11.0% who were 65 years of age or older. The median age was 38 years. For every 100 females, there were 98.6 males. For every 100 females age 18 and over, there were 97.3 males.

The median household income was $47,358 and the median family income was $51,534. Males had a median income of $43,958 versus $24,250 for females. The per capita income for the township was $21,960. About 3.3% of families and 5.5% of the population were below the poverty line, including 4.7% of those under age 18 and 7.5% of those age 65 or over.

== Highways ==
- M-13 forms the entire eastern boundary of the township.
