= Corunna High School =

Location
- 417 E. King Street; Corunna, Michigan 48817; United States; 42°59′07″N 84°06′47″W

Information
- Other name: CHS
- Type: Public high school
- School district: Corunna Public Schools
- Superintendent: John Fattal
- Principal: Ron Jacobs
- Teaching staff: 29.51 (FTE)
- Grades: 8–12
- Enrollment: 647 (2023–2024)
- Student to teacher ratio: 21.92
- Campus type: Rural Fringe
- Colors: Gold; Black; White
- Athletics conference: Flint Metro League
- Nickname: Cavaliers
- Rival: Owosso High School
- Yearbook: Sphinx
- Website: www.corunna.k12.mi.us/o/chs

Corunna High School (CHS) is a public secondary school located in Corunna, Michigan. The school colors are black and gold, and the sports teams have been named “The Corunna Cavaliers”. It is part of Corunna Public Schools.

== School overview ==
=== Students and faculty ===
Demographic data during the 2023–2024 school year:

Total Students: 647

Male: 53.2% Female: 46.8%

Teachers: 29.51

Student to Teacher Ratio: 21.92

Total Corunna Public Schools Students: 1,624

== Athletics ==
Corunna High School has a rich history of dominating athletics in the Mid-Michigan area, when they were a part of the MMB and MMC conferences. Since joining the Capital Area Activities Conference after the MMC was ceased to exist, Corunna has been part of the white division. It has two state championships in track and field (1998 &1999), and also has one in cross country (1997) and 2016 and basketball (1996). For the 2019–2020 school year, Corunna's athletic teams will compete in the Flint Metro League.

== Clubs ==
The Science Club has annual trips to Canada. In every odd-numbered year, the trip is to Toronto, with a trip to Niagara Falls every even-numbered year.

The Spanish Club goes to Spain every other year.

The Corunna FFA chapter has almost 200 members from the Corunna school district and educates students on both agricultural and leadership skills. They also take part in many community enrichment events and have their students apply the skills they have learned in skills and leadership contests.

The Quiz Bowl team also finished second in the State Tournament of 2006, with a loss to Williamston in the championship match. The Quiz Bowl team has recently been named 2007 State Champions for the Michigan State University's Quizbusters Challenge.

The Corunna High School Odyssey of the Mind Team has won 4 World Championships: 1991, 2000, 2003, and 2004. At least one high school team has competed in World Finals every year since 1998–1999.

The Corunna High School FIRST Robotics Competition team has made it to the Michigan State competition 3 times and the FIRST Championship twice, one of which they have made it into the Finals. They have many members and teach many skills including machining, programming, and CAD software.

== Media center ==
The media center has a collection of fiction and nonfiction books available for circulation. The information system used to locate and circulate books is Symphony. The media center has a small bank of computers available within the media center and also a classroom computer lab.

The media center is staffed with a full-time media center paraprofessional. The district has a K-12 certified media specialist.
