= Sports Creek Raceway =

Former horse racing track

- Location: Swartz Creek, Michigan
- Owned by: AmRace and Sports, LLC
- Operated by: AmRace and Sports, LLC
- Date opened: November 1986
- Date closed: January 1, 2015
- Race type: harness racing
- Course type: oval

Sports Creek Raceway was a harness racing track located on a 100-acre site near Swartz Creek, Michigan.

The track opened in 1986, eventually employing 100 workers on live racing days and 40 workers for simulcasting. In 2013, Sports Creek had $676,106 in live wagering and $15.3 million in simulcast wagering. The city received about $425 thousand a year from wager dollars until 1993 when John Engler became Michigan governor. Engler reduced cash flow from the casinos for two years until a new distribution formula allow the state to pay less, $126 to 118 thousand in the mid-2000s.

Revenues steadily declined since 1998, forcing the track to close permanently at the end of 2014. In August 2014, the raceway closed early thus reducing the 2015 season by 8 days down to 30 days. The race track was only give 10 live race days.

Sport Creek Raceway was closed by the Michigan Gaming Control Board on January 1, 2015 when the raceway could not agree to terms with the Michigan Harness Horsemen's Association. The association approached the raceway general manager about purchasing the track and claimed that they were rebuffed due to owners not wanting its use again as race track. General manager Chris Locking claimed that was false as it would have been the quickest way to get in back in use.

GM currently (2025, per Google Maps imaging) uses the raceway's parking lots for storage for trucks awaiting shipment, an arrangement which began in November, 2016.

In October, 2018, the raceway was purchased by AmRace and Sports LLC, who plan to reopen the track featuring thoroughbred racing and simulcasting.
