= Vernon, Michigan =

- Village
- Village of Vernon
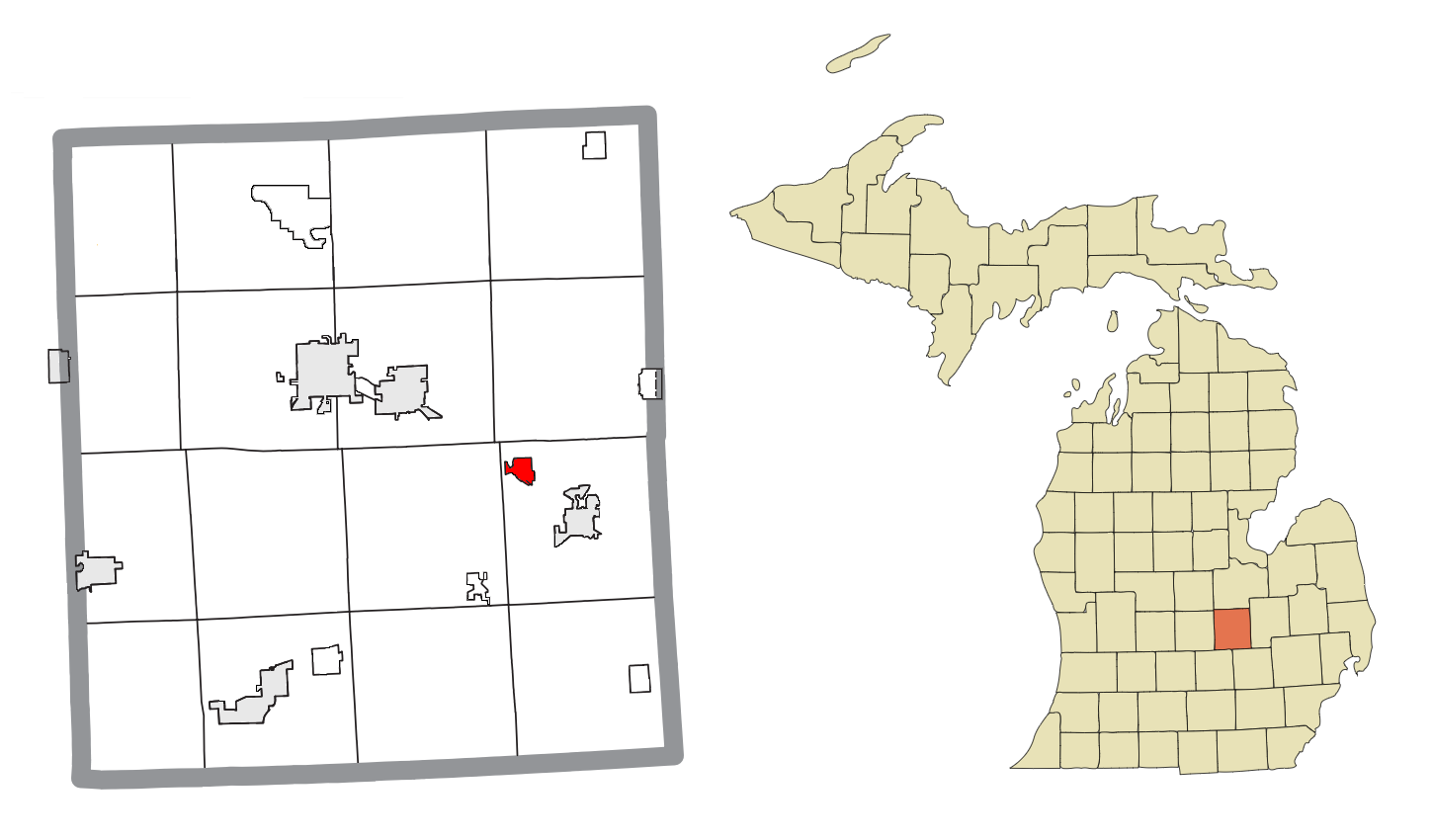
- Location within Shiawassee County

- Location within the state of Michigan
- Coordinates: 42°56′21″N 84°01′59″W
- Country: United States
- State: Michigan
- County: Shiawassee
- Township: Vernon
- Platted: 1850
- Incorporated: 1871

Government
  - Type: Village council
  - President: Kristin Van Dusen
  - Pro tempore: Robert Mac Neill

Area
  - Total: 1.02 sq mi (2.64 km^{2})
  - Land: 1.00 sq mi (2.58 km^{2})
  - Water: 0.023 sq mi (0.06 km^{2})
- Elevation: 781 ft (238 m)

Population (2020)
  - Total: 738
  - Density: 741.1/sq mi (286.13/km^{2})
- Time zone: UTC-5 (Eastern (EST))
  - Summer (DST): UTC-4 (EDT)
- ZIP code(s): 48476
- Area code: 989
- FIPS code: 26-82020
- GNIS feature ID: 2400062
- Website: Official website

Vernon is a village in Shiawassee County in the U.S. state of Michigan. The population was 738 at the 2020 census. The village is located within Vernon Township.

== History ==
A post office has been in operation in Vernon since 1842. Vernon was platted in 1850, and took its name from Vernon Township.

== Geography ==
According to the United States Census Bureau, the village has a total area of 0.71 square miles (1.84 km^{2}), of which 0.69 square miles (1.79 km^{2}) is land and 0.02 square miles (0.05 km^{2}) is water.

== Demographics ==
Historical population
Census	Pop.	Note	%±
1880	554		—
1890	585		5.6%
1900	536		−8.4%
1910	435		−18.8%
1920	417		−4.1%
1930	496		18.9%
1940	507		2.2%
1950	678		33.7%
1960	754		11.2%
1970	818		8.5%
1980	1,008		23.2%
1990	913		−9.4%
2000	847		−7.2%
2010	783		−7.6%
2020	738		−5.7%
U.S. Decennial Census

=== 2010 census ===
As of the census of 2010, there were 783 people, 292 households, and 223 families residing in the village. The population density was 1,134.8 inhabitants per square mile (438.1/km^{2}). There were 317 housing units at an average density of 459.4 per square mile (177.4/km^{2}). The racial makeup of the village was 97.3% White, 0.1% African American, 0.5% Native American, 0.1% Asian, 1.1% from other races, and 0.8% from two or more races. Hispanic or Latino of any race were 2.6% of the population.

There were 292 households, of which 38.0% had children under the age of 18 living with them, 58.6% were married couples living together, 12.0% had a female householder with no husband present, 5.8% had a male householder with no wife present, and 23.6% were non-families. 20.5% of all households were made up of individuals, and 7.2% had someone living alone who was 65 years of age or older. The average household size was 2.68 and the average family size was 3.07.

The median age in the village was 38.7 years. 27.2% of residents were under the age of 18; 5% were between the ages of 18 and 24; 26.5% were from 25 to 44; 27.7% were from 45 to 64; and 13.7% were 65 years of age or older. The gender makeup of the village was 48.3% male and 51.7% female.

=== 2000 census ===
As of the census of 2000, there were 847 people, 308 households, and 248 families residing in the village. The population density was 1,180.0 inhabitants per square mile (455.6/km^{2}). There were 315 housing units at an average density of 438.8 per square mile (169.4/km^{2}). The racial makeup of the village was 97.87% White, 0.12% African American, 0.71% Native American, 0.12% Asian, 0.24% from other races, and 0.94% from two or more races. Hispanic or Latino of any race were 1.77% of the population.

There were 308 households, out of which 37.3% had children under the age of 18 living with them, 62.7% were married couples living together, 12.7% had a female householder with no husband present, and 19.2% were non-families. 14.6% of all households were made up of individuals, and 6.8% had someone living alone who was 65 years of age or older. The average household size was 2.75 and the average family size was 3.03.

In the village, the population was spread out, with 26.2% under the age of 18, 8.9% from 18 to 24, 28.7% from 25 to 44, 24.6% from 45 to 64, and 11.7% who were 65 years of age or older. The median age was 35 years. For every 100 females, there were 95.2 males. For every 100 females age 18 and over, there were 89.4 males.

The median income for a household in the village was $47,875, and the median income for a family was $50,795. Males had a median income of $40,417 versus $23,854 for females. The per capita income for the village was $16,337. About 3.7% of families and 4.8% of the population were below the poverty line, including 5.8% of those under age 18 and 2.4% of those age 65 or over.

== Highways ==
- M-71

== Notable people ==
- Willis Bouchey, actor who appeared in more than 100 films and TV shows.
- Grant Reed, 6th Mayor of Anchorage, Alaska
