= Shiawassee Street School =

- U.S. National Register of Historic Places
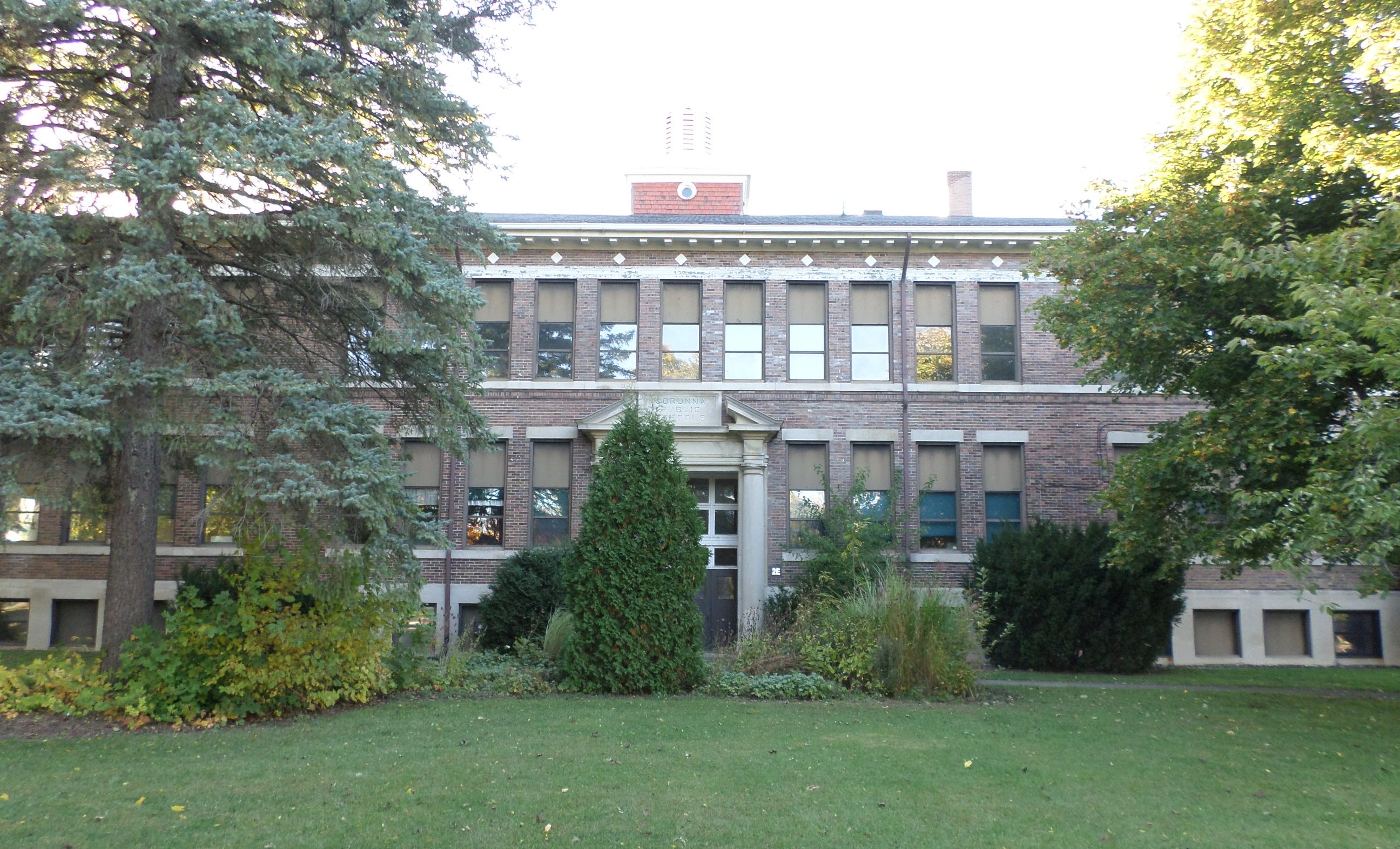
- Interactive map
- Location: 106 S. Shiawassee St., Corunna, Michigan
- Coordinates: 42°58′46″N 84°07′07″W
- Built: 1908
- Built by: Rickman and Son
- Architect: Edwyn A. Bowd
- Architectural style: Georgian Revival
- NRHP reference No.: 100000748
- Added to NRHP: March 13, 2017

The Shiawassee Street School, also known as the Corunna Union School or the Corunna High School, is a former school building located at 106 South Shiawassee Street in Corunna, Michigan. It was listed on the National Register of Historic Places in 2017. It has been redeveloped into an apartment building known as Cavalier Greene.

== History ==
The Corunna School District was organized in 1842, and a single-story frame school was built at this site. As Corunna grew, more room was needed, and in 1851 a two-story brick school was built to replace the earlier frame structure. A larger, three-story brick school was constructed nearby in 1866, but in 1882, both buildings burned. Later that year, a fourth school building, three stories high, was constructed on the same site, serving children from kindergarten through twelve grade. In 1908, this school too burned. That year, the school board hired architect Edwyn A. Bowd of Lansing, Michigan to design the present building, and the firm of Rickman and Son to construct it. This school opened in January 1909. The building served as an elementary school between 1952 and 1976, then became the home of Community Education courses and the Corunna Public Schools Administrative Offices.

The building was closed in 2014, when it was deemed unsafe by the Corunna School District. In 2016, redevelopment began to turn the school into apartments.

== Description ==
The Shiawassee Street School is a two-story brick Georgian Revival style school trimmed in limestone. It has a bell tower topped with a cupola.
