= Bancroft, Michigan =

- Village
- Village of Bancroft
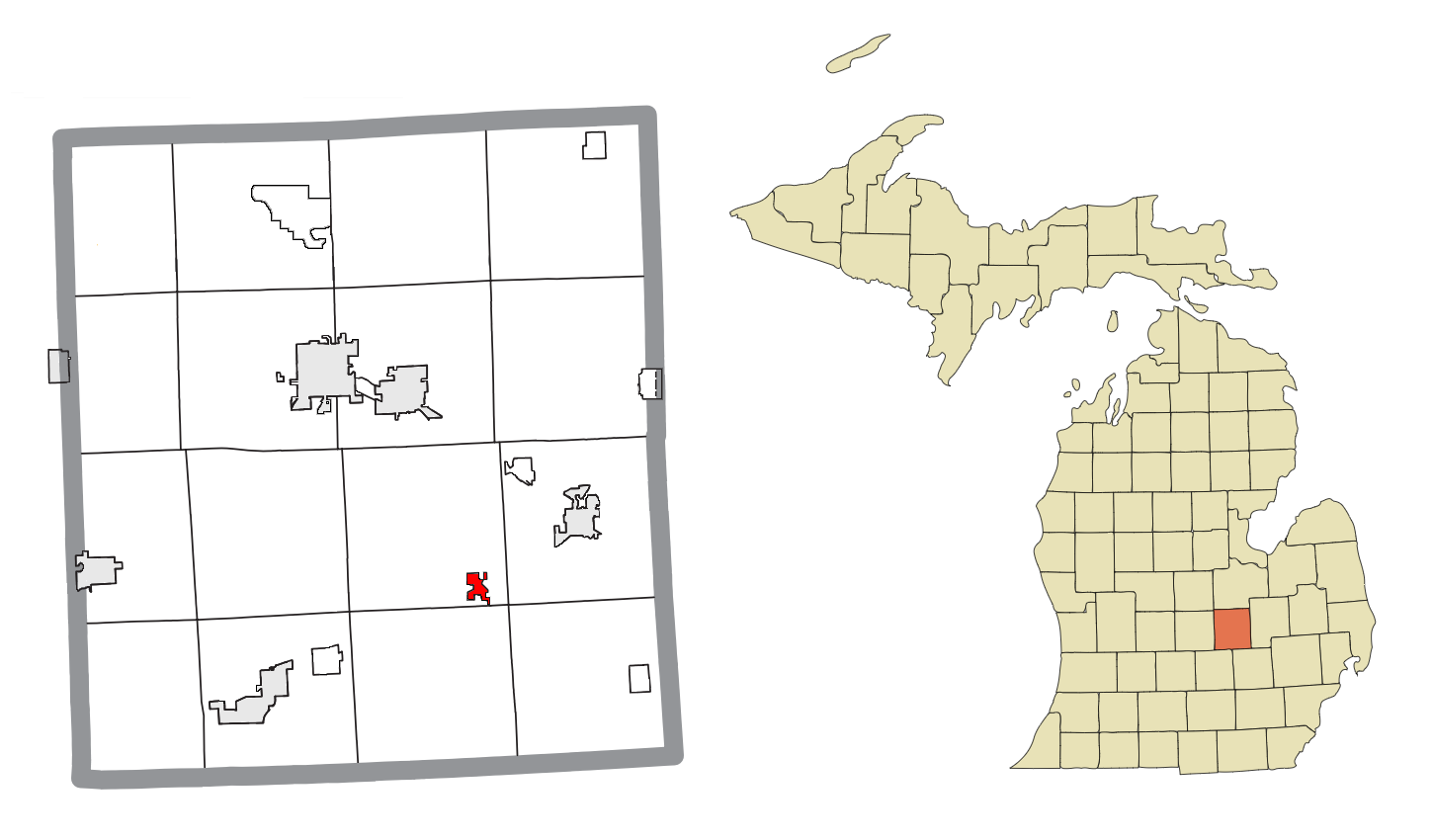
- Location within Shiawassee County

- Location within the state of Michigan
- Coordinates: 42°52′36″N 84°03′57″W
- Country: United States
- State: Michigan
- County: Shiawassee
- Township: Shiawassee
- Platted: 1877
- Incorporated: 1883

Government
  - Type: Village council
  - President: Brian Barnum
  - Clerk: Ashley Goodrich
  - Treasurer: Linda Sedlock

Area
  - Total: 0.59 sq mi (1.53 km^{2})
  - Land: 0.59 sq mi (1.53 km^{2})
  - Water: 0 sq mi (0.00 km^{2})
- Elevation: 853 ft (260 m)

Population (2020)
  - Total: 484
  - Density: 818.2/sq mi (315.91/km^{2})
- Time zone: UTC-5 (Eastern (EST))
  - Summer (DST): UTC-4 (EDT)
- ZIP code(s): 48414
- Area code: 989
- FIPS code: 26-05080
- GNIS feature ID: 2398026
- Website: Official website

Bancroft is a village in Shiawassee County in the U.S. state of Michigan. The population was 484 at the 2020 census. The village is located within Shiawassee Township.

== History ==
Bancroft was platted in 1877 when the railroad was extended to that point. The settlement took its name from the Bancroft Mining Company. A post office has been in operation in Bancroft since 1877. The village of Bancroft was incorporated in 1883.

== Geography ==
According to the United States Census Bureau, the village has a total area of 0.58 square miles (1.50 km^{2}), all land.

== Demographics ==
Historical population
Census	Pop.	Note	%±
1880	387		—
1890	642		65.9%
1900	528		−17.8%
1910	543		2.8%
1920	529		−2.6%
1930	439		−17.0%
1940	581		32.3%
1950	615		5.9%
1960	636		3.4%
1970	724		13.8%
1980	618		−14.6%
1990	599		−3.1%
2000	616		2.8%
2010	545		−11.5%
2020	484		−11.2%
U.S. Decennial Census

=== 2010 census ===
As of the census of 2010, there were 545 people, 191 households, and 142 families residing in the village. The population density was 939.7 inhabitants per square mile (362.8/km^{2}). There were 214 housing units at an average density of 369.0 per square mile (142.5/km^{2}). The racial makeup of the village was 97.4% White, 0.6% African American, 0.7% Native American, 0.2% from other races, and 1.1% from two or more races. Hispanic or Latino of any race were 1.1% of the population.

There were 191 households, of which 41.9% had children under the age of 18 living with them, 57.6% were married couples living together, 10.5% had a female householder with no husband present, 6.3% had a male householder with no wife present, and 25.7% were non-families. 19.9% of all households were made up of individuals, and 4.7% had someone living alone who was 65 years of age or older. The average household size was 2.85 and the average family size was 3.29.

The median age in the village was 35.9 years. 27.2% of residents were under the age of 18; 9.1% were between the ages of 18 and 24; 25.6% were from 25 to 44; 28.9% were from 45 to 64; and 9.2% were 65 years of age or older. The gender makeup of the village was 51.6% male and 48.4% female.

=== 2000 census ===
As of the census of 2000, there were 616 people, 203 households, and 158 families residing in the village. The population density was 1,049.4 inhabitants per square mile (405.2/km^{2}). There were 218 housing units at an average density of 371.4 per square mile (143.4/km^{2}). The racial makeup of the village was 96.43% White, 0.32% Native American, 0.16% from other races, and 3.08% from two or more races. Hispanic or Latino of any race were 1.14% of the population.

There were 203 households, out of which 40.9% had children under the age of 18 living with them, 62.6% were married couples living together, 11.8% had a female householder with no husband present, and 21.7% were non-families. 17.7% of all households were made up of individuals, and 9.4% had someone living alone who was 65 years of age or older. The average household size was 3.03 and the average family size was 3.39.

In the village, the population was spread out, with 31.0% under the age of 18, 9.1% from 18 to 24, 28.9% from 25 to 44, 20.8% from 45 to 64, and 10.2% who were 65 years of age or older. The median age was 32 years. For every 100 females, there were 89.5 males. For every 100 females age 18 and over, there were 90.6 males.

The median income for a household in the village was $41,538, and the median income for a family was $42,500. Males had a median income of $35,972 versus $22,500 for females. The per capita income for the village was $15,451. About 8.5% of families and 10.3% of the population were below the poverty line, including 9.4% of those under age 18 and 8.5% of those age 65 or over.
