= Swartz Creek, Michigan =

- City
- City of Swartz Creek
- Motto: Where Friendships Last Forever
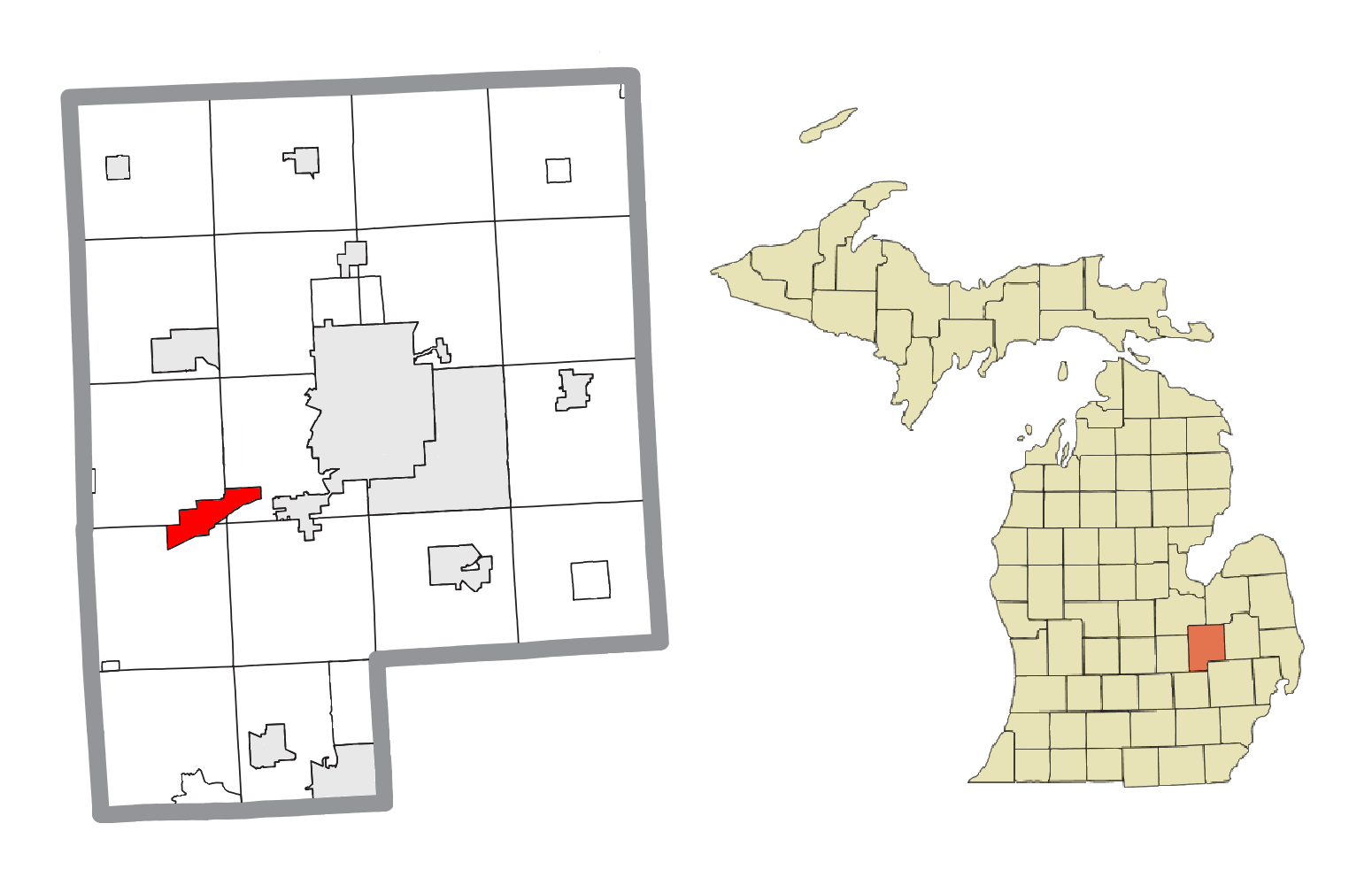
- Location within Genesee County

- Location within the state of Michigan
- Coordinates: 42°57′43″N 83°49′35″W
- Country: United States
- State: Michigan
- County: Genesee
- Settled: 1836
- Platted: 1877
- Incorporated: 1959

Government
  - Type: Council–manager
  - Mayor: Nate Henry
  - Mayor Pro-tem: Rae Lynn Hicks
  - City manager: Adam Zettel
  - City Clerk: Renee Kraft

Area
  - Total: 4.19 sq mi (10.86 km^{2})
  - Land: 4.19 sq mi (10.86 km^{2})
  - Water: 0.0039 sq mi (0.01 km^{2})
- Elevation: 771 ft (235 m)

Population (2020)
  - Total: 5,897
  - Density: 1,406.9/sq mi (543.22/km^{2})
- Time zone: UTC-5 (EST)
  - Summer (DST): UTC-4 (EDT)
- ZIP code(s): 48473; 48554 (Flint)
- Area code: 810
- FIPS code: 26-77700
- GNIS feature ID: 1614476
- Website: cityofswartzcreekmi.gov

Swartz Creek is a city in Genesee County in the U.S. state of Michigan. The population was 5,897 at the 2020 census. The city is a suburb of Flint and has incorporated land formerly within Flint Charter Township, Gaines Township, and Clayton Township, but is administratively autonomous from all three.

== History ==
Native Americans traveled the trail that paralleled the Swartz Creek to reach the maple trees, on what would later be the Crapo Farm, to fish, gather fruit, and hunt. This trail terminated in the Lansing area.

=== Predecessor communities ===
==== Miller's Settlement ====
Miller Settlement Population
Year	Pop.	±% p.a.
1880	132	—
1916	650	+4.53%

The Miller Settlement, and future core Swartz Creek community, was founded in June 1836 when it was first settled by Adam Miller, a German, and his family of eleven children in then Flint Township at its original size of 9 township survey areas. On March 11, 1837, just weeks after Michigan became a state, the southern area that would make up the community was placed into Mundy Township. Flushing Township was formed on March 6, 1838, split off from Flint Township, and included the northern part of the settlement. Two settlers were buried on the Miller property before that acre was deeded to Flushing township by Adam Miller.

In 1848, Miller Road was designed as a state road. in 1842, a post office was set up in the community called Swartz Creek after the stream. Soon, the community assumed that name. The Village of Swartz Creek subdivision was platted in 1877.

In 1881, Swartz Creek had a rail station called Hamilton. Serving the station was the Goodyear and Miller elevator and Western Union Telegraph. The locality also had a hotel run by William Brown, a Methodist church and a district school. The creek powered a saw mill and a flour mill at the time. Sommers & Brewer business was a manufacturer of potash.

The first Masonic Temple in the community was built in 1906 on Miller Road. By the 1910s, the unincorporated village's major industry was sugar beet farming with three beet weighing stations. An elevator and two churches were located there by 1916. A private bank, which was managed by Ira T. Sayre as part of a chain, was also open at that time.

In 1927, the community's downtown roads were paved with gravel supplied by the Crapo Gravel Company, which created the now Winchester Lake. Electrical power was brought to the area that same year.

On Wednesday, April 7, 1954, at about 7:40 PM, a small tornado hit the community. The tornado destroyed the fire hall, knocking down power lines and taking roofs off homes while only injuring two.

==== Otterburn ====
Otterburn as the rest of Flint Township was in Grand Blanc Township at its organized on March 9, 1833, then split off into Flint Township on March 2, 1836, then with the west half of the survey area was place in Flushing Township. The first land purchase in section 31, the general area of Otterburn, was on May 30, 1836, by John W. McNair.

Otterburn was in Flint Township, had about 150 residents and had its own train depot that opened in 1882. The location was known as Otterburn as otters were generally seen there on the Swartz Creek, a burn. On August 27, 1887, Charles F. Shumway assumed the position of postmaster for the post office upon its opening. The post office closed on October 31, 1913. In 1957, a Chevrolet plant, which was also referred to as Otterburn, was built in this area for its service and parts operations moved from the west Flint Chevy in the Hole complex.

==== Winchester developments ====
Crapo Farm was sold in 1955 after parts were donated for St. Mary's Cemetery and Mary Crapo School. The Winchester Village subdivision was built on the former farm. Which was followed by another, Winchester Woods. All of the village and most of the woods were incorporated into the City of Swartz Creek in 1959 at its founding.

=== City ===
In the 1950s, GM executive started a "New Flint" regional/metropolitan government plan to incorporate the metropolitan area into Flint. The proposal was released in 1957 and petition began circulating the next year. Area residents were fearful that New Flint would bring the Otterburn plant into its borders. While New Flint proponents indicated this would not be the case, area residents campaigned against New Flint while moving to incorporate the area. The city was incorporated on December 1, 1959. The city included parts of Gaines (Winchester Village), Clayton and Flint Townships (Otterburn).

In 1986, Sports Creek Raceway opened. The raceway was a harness racing track. The city received about $425,000 a year from wager dollars until 1993 when John Engler became Michigan governor. Engler reduced cash flow from the casinos for two years until a new distribution formula allowed the state to contribute less: from $126,000 to $118,000 by the mid-2000s.

In the 2000s, Gaines and Mundy Townships ceased contributions to cover building costs for the Swartz Creek Perkins Library, while Clayton Township ceased funding in 2011. In April 2011, the Flint Flames, a semi-professional Women's Blue Chip Basketball League team, changed ownership and its name to Flint Monarchs. The Monarchs then moved its games to the Cage Field House in Swartz Creek from its previous location at Flint Northern High School. In 2014, the Monarchs moved their games back to Flint.

In 2004, the city formed a downtown development authority. In 2006, Meijer announced plans to build a location in Swartz Creek. Construction started in September 2012, and on May 16, 2013, the store opened on Morrish Road north of I-69.

In December 2013, the city council voted 4 to 3 to adopt a 4.9-mil public safety special assessment district consisting of the whole city. While a referendum petition could take the assessment to the ballot, some city residents threatened to recall members of city council who supported the millage. In January and February 2014, the city and Gaines Township were contacted by Mundy Township Supervisor David L. Guigear with the intent of regionalizing their building departments, code enforcement activities, janitorial services and police departments.

Also in December 2013, City Manager Paul Bueche, who was preparing for medical and disability leave, recommended the promotion of Adam Zettel, the current city zoning administrator and DDA Director, as interim City Manager. Zettel was also assistant city manager for the city of Owosso and former assistant city manager for the city from 2006 to 2010. The city council accepted Bueche's recommendation and hired Zettel effective January 1, 2014. Bueche died on May 15, 2014.

Sport Creek Raceway was closed by the Michigan Gaming Control Board on January 1, 2015, as the raceway could not agree to terms with the Michigan Harness Horsemen's Association. As of 2023, despite being under new ownership, there continue to be no plans to reopen the track.

A 5.7-mil property-tax levy for streets was placed on the May 5, 2015, ballot. The city proposal failed 729 to 831. On May 3, 2016, a smaller 4.22-mil property-tax levy for street improvements was finally approved by city residents.

Fourth-precinct council member Michael Shumaker died on March 2, 2016, with his appointed temporary replacement being Jim Florence. A council member considered the city charter to have conflicting provisions thus bring into question an interim election in November. After 34 years of council service, Richard B. Abrams, last serving as mayor pro tem and prior mayor, did not seek reelection in November 2016.

On January 9, 2016, the Swartz Creek City Council voted to disband its police department by merging the department with Mundy Township's into the Metro Police Authority of Genesee County effective February 1, 2017. On October 1, 2019, the city turned over the operation of the city's parking violations bureau to the Metro Police Authority. Swartz Creek began receiving Karegnondi Water Authority water treated by Genesee County Drain Commission Water and Waste Division on December 15, 2017.

By January 2022, Swartz Creek Community Schools completed a series of renovations on both schools within the city limits, in addition to the satellite elementary schools. A new, updated football field was completed in 2019, four years after the completion of the Swartz Creek Performing Arts Center. A new STEM wing was constructed at the high school, while the middle school continues to undergo construction to allow for STEM classrooms and performing arts facilities.

== Government ==
At-Large/Precinct office	Councillor
At-Large	David A. Krueger
At-Large	John A. Gilbert
At-Large	Walter Melen
Ward 1	John Knickerbocker
Ward 2 Mayor Pro-tem	Rae Lynn Hicks
Ward 3 Mayor	Nate Henry
Ward 4	David Spillane

The city has three parks, Elms Road Park, Abrams Park and Bicentennial Park, with Bicentennial being a limited park with a pavilion and a few benches. The city provides a building that is shared by the senior center and the library branch.

The city is served by the following other governmental agencies:

- Swartz Creek Area Fire Department, a joint fire department with Clayton Township
- Perkins Library, which also serves Clayton, Gaines and Mundy Townships, is a branch of the Genesee District Library.
- Metro Police Authority of Genesee County, an authority which provides its members, the City of Swartz Creek and Mundy Township, Police service
- Flint Area Narcotics Group (FANG)
- Genesee Auto Theft Investigation Network (GAIN)
- Genesee County Drain Commission provides treated water to the city from the Karegnondi Water Authority water pipeline.
- Swartz Creek Community Schools

District	Number	Officeholder
U.S. Representative	5th	Dan Kildee
State Senate	27	Jim Ananich
State Representative	49	Phil Phelps
County Commissioner	8	Ted Henry
District Court	67th 4th Division A - Fenton	Mark McCabe, Chief Judge
Community College	C.S. Mott	Multiple; see article
Polling Location	SC United Methodist Church	all precincts

== Geography ==
According to the United States Census Bureau, the city has a total area of 4.04 square miles (10.46 km^{2}), all land.

The west branch of the Swartz Creek flows from west to east through the city, generally as the southern border for the east most third, toward the Flint River, leaving the southeast corner of Clayton Township separated from the rest of the township. Just south and parallel to the creek is the Canadian National Railway line, formerly the Grand Trunk line, which runs between Flint and Durand.

== Demographics ==
Historical population
Census	Pop.	Note	%±
1960	3,006		—
1970	4,928		63.9%
1980	5,013		1.7%
1990	4,851		−3.2%
2000	5,102		5.2%
2010	5,758		12.9%
2020	5,897		2.4%
Source: Census Bureau. Census 1960-2000, 2010.

City of Swartz Creek 2010 Racial Makeup
White	91.6%
African American	5.1%
two or more	1.8%
Asian	0.8%
other races	0.5%
Native American	0.2%
Hispanic or Latino	2.3%

=== 2020 census ===
As of the 2020 census, Swartz Creek had a population of 5,897. The median age was 44.1 years. 21.2% of residents were under the age of 18 and 25.0% of residents were 65 years of age or older. For every 100 females there were 82.1 males, and for every 100 females age 18 and over there were 76.7 males age 18 and over.

99.9% of residents lived in urban areas, while 0.1% lived in rural areas.

There were 2,669 households in Swartz Creek, of which 26.9% had children under the age of 18 living in them. Of all households, 36.9% were married-couple households, 16.6% were households with a male householder and no spouse or partner present, and 39.6% were households with a female householder and no spouse or partner present. About 35.4% of all households were made up of individuals and 19.4% had someone living alone who was 65 years of age or older.

There were 2,803 housing units, of which 4.8% were vacant. The homeowner vacancy rate was 0.9% and the rental vacancy rate was 5.5%.

Racial composition as of the 2020 census
Race	Number	Percentage
White	4,976	84.4%
Black or African American	413	7.0%
American Indian and Alaska Native	8	0.1%
Asian	43	0.7%
Native Hawaiian and Other Pacific Islander	7	0.1%
Some other race	51	0.9%
Two or more races	399	6.8%
Hispanic or Latino (of any race)	180	3.1%

=== 2010 census ===
As of the census of 2010, there were 5,758 people, 2,554 households, and 1,632 families residing in the city. The population density was 1,425.2 inhabitants per square mile (550.3/km^{2}). There were 2,749 housing units at an average density of 680.4 per square mile (262.7/km^{2}). The racial makeup of the city was 91.6% White, 5.1% African American, 0.2% Native American, 0.8% Asian, 0.5% from other races, and 1.8% from two or more races. Hispanic or Latino of any race were 2.3% of the population.

There were 2,554 households, of which 30.1% had children under the age of 18 living with them, 42.5% were married couples living together, 17.0% had a female householder with no husband present, 4.4% had a male householder with no wife present, and 36.1% were non-families. 31.9% of all households were made up of individuals, and 15.3% had someone living alone who was 65 years of age or older. The average household size was 2.25 and the average family size was 2.80.

The median age in the city was 41 years. 22.6% of residents were under the age of 18; 7.4% were between the ages of 18 and 24; 24.4% were from 25 to 44; 25.5% were from 45 to 64; and 20.1% were 65 years of age or older. The gender makeup of the city was 44.8% male and 55.2% female.

=== 2000 census ===
At the 2000 census, there were 5,102 people, 2,233 households and 1,460 families residing in the city. The population density was 1,269.6 inhabitants per square mile (490.2/km^{2}). There were 2,355 housing units at an average density of 586.0 per square mile (226.3/km^{2}). The racial makeup of the city was 95.83% White, 1.22% African American, 0.35% Native American, 0.63% Asian, 0.02% Pacific Islander, 0.43% from other races, and 1.53% from two or more races. Hispanic or Latino of any race were 2.10% of the population.

There were 2,233 households, of which 28.1% had children under the age of 18 living with them, 48.6% were married couples living together, 13.7% had a female householder with no husband present, and 34.6% were non-families. 30.6% of all households were made up of individuals, and 13.3% had someone living alone who was 65 years of age or older. The average household size was 2.27 and the average family size was 2.82.

Age distribution was 22.3% under the age of 18, 8.5% from 18 to 24, 27.8% from 25 to 44, 24.6% from 45 to 64, and 16.8% who were 65 years of age or older. The median age was 40 years. For every 100 females, there were 87.6 males. For every 100 females age 18 and over, there were 80.9 males.

The median household income was $42,112, and the median family income was $52,147. Males had a median income of $46,442 versus $29,010 for females. The per capita income for the city was $22,046. About 4.4% of families and 6.5% of the population were below the poverty line, including 9.2% of those under age 18 and 4.8% of those age 65 or over.

== Climate ==
This climatic region is typified by large seasonal temperature differences, with warm to hot (and often humid) summers and cold (sometimes severely cold) winters. According to the Köppen Climate Classification system, Swartz Creek has a humid continental climate, abbreviated Dfb on climate maps.

== See also ==
- Swartz Creek
