= Gaines, Michigan =

- Village
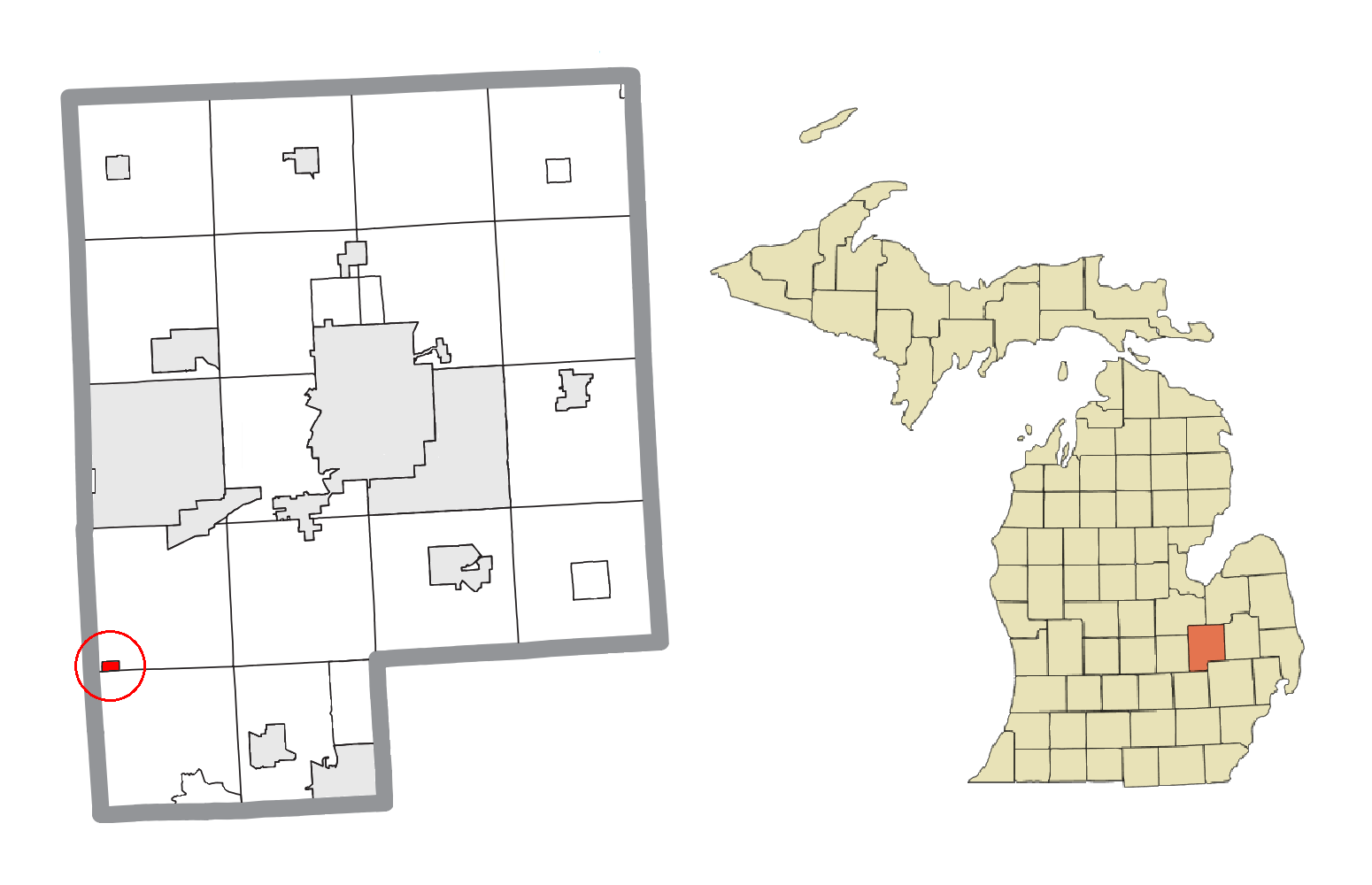
- Location within Genesee County

- Location within the state of Michigan
- Coordinates: 42°52′20″N 83°54′47″W
- Country: United States
- State: Michigan
- County: Genesee
- Township: Gaines
- Settled: 1856
- Platted: 1859
- Incorporated: 1875

Government
  - Type: Village council
  - President: Valerie DeLauter

Area
  - Total: 0.37 sq mi (0.97 km^{2})
  - Land: 0.37 sq mi (0.97 km^{2})
  - Water: 0 sq mi (0.00 km^{2})
- Elevation: 856 ft (261 m)

Population (2020)
  - Total: 377
  - Density: 1,009.0/sq mi (389.59/km^{2})
- Time zone: UTC-5 (EST)
  - Summer (DST): UTC-4 (EDT)
- ZIP code(s): 48436
- Area code: 989
- FIPS code: 26-31200
- GNIS feature ID: 0626594
- Website: https://villageofgaines.net/

Gaines is a village in Genesee County in the U.S. state of Michigan. As of the 2020 census, Gaines had a population of 377. The village is within Gaines Township.

== History ==
The Village of Gaines area did not see a settler until 1856. The first passenger train passed through the future village site on July 4, 1856, and a post office, Gaines Station, was established that same year. In 1859, the village was platted. The Grand Trunk Western Railroad depot, built in 1884. The Village of Gaines was incorporated in 1875.

The Gaines Train Station saw its last passengers boarded and disembarked in 1957. In the 1970s, a business occupied the building. After setting vacant for years, the S.O.S. – Save Our Station group of Gaines residents organized in 1992 to restore the station. SOS later incorporated as the nonprofit Gaines Station Incorporated. After $100,000 in repairs in 1997, the station was turned over to the village. The station then began its use as the smallest branch of the Genesee District Library. On July 15, 2017, a Michigan Historical Marker was unveiled for the station.

In August 2016, the village's lone police officer retired. By March 9, 2017, the village council formally dissolved the police department and Gaines Township purchased the police car.

== Government ==
The village was incorporated under the General Law Village Act provisions making its government form a weak mayor-council. The governing body is the Village Council which comprises the Village President, its presiding officer, and 6 trustees. Treasurer and Clerk are elected. The trustee are elected for two-year terms. The elected officers are elected to one year terms. Police services are provided by Gaines Township.

Village Council

Year	President	Councilors
2014	Sam Stiff	Carol Erickson, Barb Ferris, James Savage, Kathy Volkening, Diane Nowak, Sherry Lang
2016	Sam Stiff	Diane Nowak, Emily Alexander, Melissa Neal, Barb Ferris, James Savage, Carol Erickson
2022	Connie Greene	Diane Nowak, Wayne McGuire, Valerie DeLauter, Mark Sanborn, Taunya Merak, Ronda Roach

District	Number	Officeholder
U.S. Representative	5	
State Senate	27	
State Representative	49	
County Commissioner	6	
District Court	4th Division - Fenton	Mark McCabe, Chief Judge
School district	Swartz Creek	Multiple; see article
Community College	C.S. Mott	Multiple: see article
Polling Location		

== Geography ==
According to the United States Census Bureau, the village has a total area of 0.37 square miles (0.96 km^{2}), all land. It lies within Gaines Township at the border with Argentine Township.

== Demographics ==
Historical population
Census	Pop.	Note	%±
1880	344		—
1890	304		−11.6%
1900	240		−21.1%
1910	238		−0.8%
1920	260		9.2%
1930	250		−3.8%
1940	268		7.2%
1950	352		31.3%
1960	387		9.9%
1970	408		5.4%
1980	440		7.8%
1990	427		−3.0%
2000	366		−14.3%
2010	380		3.8%
2020	377		−0.8%
Source: Census Bureau. Census 1960- 2000, 2010.

=== 2010 census ===
As of the census of 2010, there were 380 people, 154 households, and 98 families living in the village. The population density was 1,027.0 inhabitants per square mile (396.5/km^{2}). There were 171 housing units at an average density of 462.2 per square mile (178.5/km^{2}). The racial makeup of the village was 97.9% White, 0.3% African American, 0.5% Native American, 0.3% from other races, and 1.1% from two or more races. Hispanic or Latino of any race were 1.8% of the population.

There were 154 households, of which 33.8% had children under the age of 18 living with them, 50.0% were married couples living together, 7.8% had a female householder with no husband present, 5.8% had a male householder with no wife present, and 36.4% were non-families. 31.8% of all households were made up of individuals, and 14.2% had someone living alone who was 65 years of age or older. The average household size was 2.47 and the average family size was 3.09.

The median age in the village was 38.5 years. 26.6% of residents were under the age of 18; 6.9% were between the ages of 18 and 24; 26.5% were from 25 to 44; 28% were from 45 to 64; and 12.1% were 65 years of age or older. The gender makeup of the village was 50.3% male and 49.7% female.

=== 2000 census ===
As of the census of 2000, there were 366 people, 143 households, and 98 families living in the village. The population density was 1,205.5 inhabitants per square mile (465.4/km^{2}). There were 155 housing units at an average density of 510.5 per square mile (197.1/km^{2}). The racial makeup of the village was 93.72% White, 1.91% African American, 0.55% Asian, 1.37% from other races, and 2.46% from two or more races. Hispanic or Latino of any race were 1.64% of the population.

There were 143 households, out of which 33.6% had children under the age of 18 living with them, 51.0% were married couples living together, 11.9% had a female householder with no husband present, and 30.8% were non-families. 25.9% of all households were made up of individuals, and 8.4% had someone living alone who was 65 years of age or older. The average household size was 2.56 and the average family size was 2.99.

In the village, the population was spread out, with 28.1% under the age of 18, 10.1% from 18 to 24, 28.1% from 25 to 44, 24.6% from 45 to 64, and 9.0% who were 65 years of age or older. The median age was 35 years. For every 100 females, there were 104.5 males. For every 100 females age 18 and over, there were 92.0 males.

The median income for a household in the village was $44,375, and the median income for a family was $46,250. Males had a median income of $50,625 versus $22,500 for females. The per capita income for the village was $19,790. About 8.5% of families and 10.3% of the population were below the poverty line, including 13.6% of those under age 18 and 18.5% of those age 65 or over.
