= Venice Township, Michigan =

- Civil township
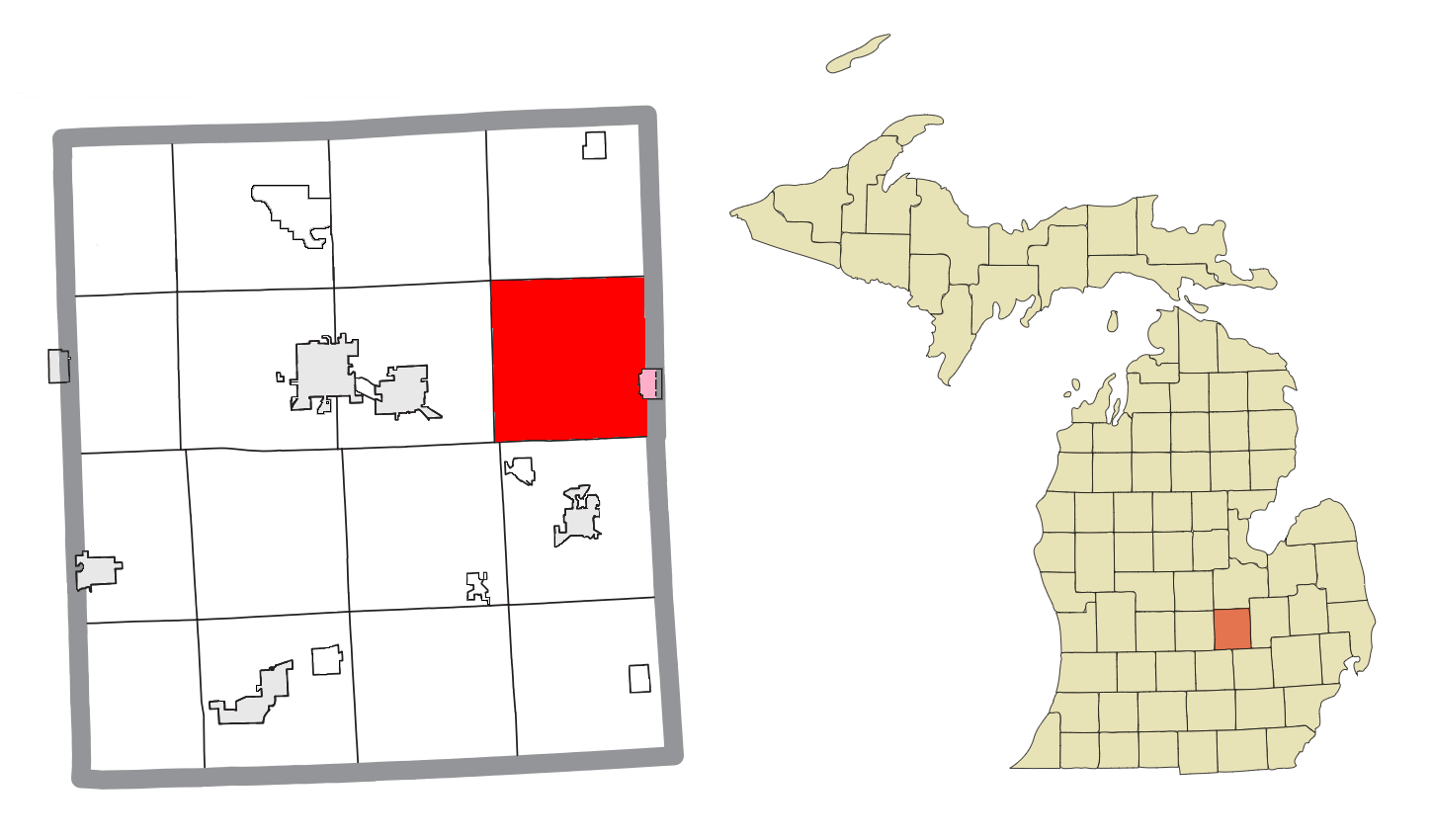
- Location within Shiawassee County (red) and an administered portion of the Lennon village (pink)

- Location within the state of Michigan Venice Township (the United States)
- Coordinates: 42°59′31″N 83°57′48″W
- Country: United States
- State: Michigan
- County: Shiawassee
- Settled: 1836
- Organized: 1843

Government
  - Supervisor: Kevin Kingsbury
  - Clerk: Alissa Sumner
  - Treasurer: Kristina Hurd

Area
  - Total: 37.52 sq mi (97.2 km^{2})
  - Land: 37.44 sq mi (97.0 km^{2})
  - Water: 0.08 sq mi (0.21 km^{2})
- Elevation: 748 ft (228 m)

Population (2020)
  - Total: 2,422
  - Density: 64.69/sq mi (24.98/km^{2})
- Time zone: UTC-5 (Eastern)
  - Summer (DST): UTC-4 (Eastern)
- ZIP code(s): 48429 (Durand); 48433 (Flushing); 48449 (Lennon); 48817 (Corunna)
- Area codes: 810 and 989
- FIPS code: 26-81880
- GNIS feature ID: 1627192
- Website: Official website

Venice Township is a civil township of Shiawassee County in the U.S. state of Michigan. The population was 2,422 at the 2020 census.

== Communities ==
- Lennon is a village partially within the township on the eastern border.

== Geography ==
According to the United States Census Bureau, the township has a total area of 37.52 square miles (97.18 km^{2}), of which 37.44 square miles (96.97 km^{2}) is land and 0.08 square miles (0.21 km^{2}) (0.21%) is water.

Misteguay Creek flows through the northeastern corner of the township.

== Demographics ==
As of the census of 2000, there were 2,588 people, 979 households, and 748 families residing in the township. The population density was 69.1 inhabitants per square mile (26.7/km^{2}). There were 1,020 housing units at an average density of 27.2 per square mile (10.5/km^{2}). The racial makeup of the township was 97.68% White, 0.08% African American, 0.23% Native American, 0.08% Asian, 0.70% from other races, and 1.24% from two or more races. Hispanic or Latino of any race were 1.97% of the population.

There were 979 households, out of which 31.1% had children under the age of 18 living with them, 64.0% were married couples living together, 8.8% had a female householder with no husband present, and 23.5% were non-families. 20.4% of all households were made up of individuals, and 9.6% had someone living alone who was 65 years of age or older. The average household size was 2.64 and the average family size was 3.03.

In the township the population was spread out, with 25.5% under the age of 18, 6.2% from 18 to 24, 28.1% from 25 to 44, 26.7% from 45 to 64, and 13.6% who were 65 years of age or older. The median age was 40 years. For every 100 females, there were 100.6 males. For every 100 females age 18 and over, there were 101.3 males.

The median income for a household in the township was $45,833, and the median income for a family was $51,474. Males had a median income of $45,897 versus $25,441 for females. The per capita income for the township was $19,119. About 2.1% of families and 4.4% of the population were below the poverty line, including 2.2% of those under age 18 and 15.0% of those age 65 or over.

== Highways ==
- I-69
- M-13
- M-21
