= Clayton Township, Genesee County, Michigan =

Clayton Township, Michigan
- Charter township
- Charter Township of Clayton
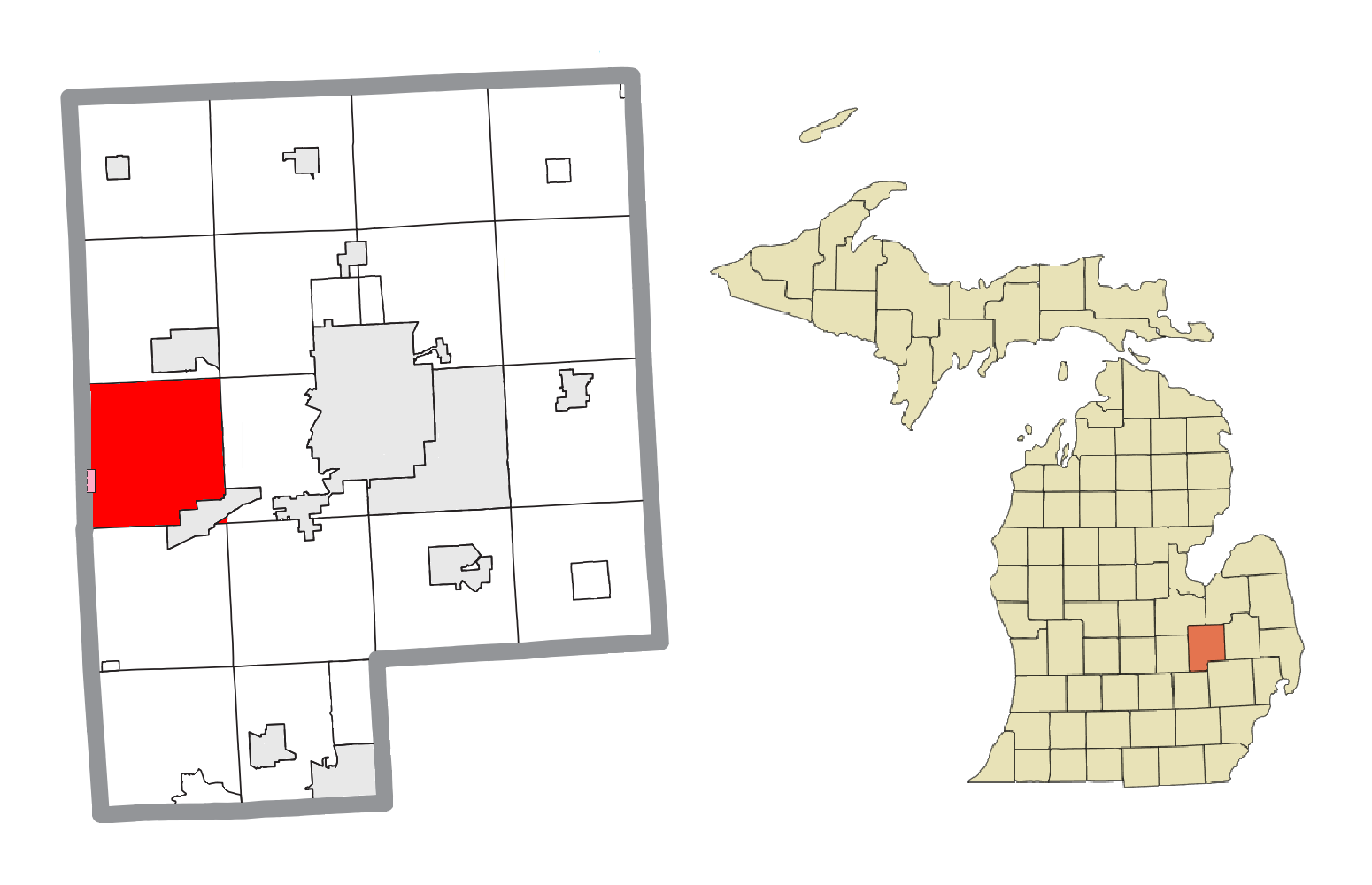
- Location within Genesee County (red) and an administered portion of the village of Lennon (pink)

- Location within the state of Michigan
- Coordinates: 42°59′54″N 83°52′41″W
- Country: United States
- State: Michigan
- County: Genesee
- Settled: 1839
- Organized: 1846

Government
  - Supervisor: Chris Gehringer
  - Clerk: Dennis Milem
  - Treasurer: Rick Caruso

Area
  - Total: 34.2 sq mi (88.7 km^{2})
  - Land: 34.2 sq mi (88.7 km^{2})
  - Water: 0 sq mi (0.0 km^{2})
- Elevation: 764 ft (233 m)

Population (2020)
  - Total: 7,460
  - Density: 218/sq mi (84.1/km^{2})
- Time zone: UTC-5 (Eastern (EST))
  - Summer (DST): UTC-4 (EDT)
- ZIP code(s): 48433 (Flushing); 48449 (Lennon); 48473 (Swartz Creek); 48532 (Flint)
- Area code: 810
- FIPS code: 26-16260
- GNIS feature ID: 1626093
- Website: www.claytontownship.org

Clayton Charter Township, or more officially Charter Township of Clayton, is a charter township of Genesee County in the U.S. state of Michigan. The population was 7,460 at the 2020 census.

== Communities ==
- The Village of Lennon is partially within the township on the western border.

== History ==
In the Northeast area of the township on November 2, 1855, the Valeria post office opened with Andrew N. Felt as postmaster. This PO closed on November 21, 1860.

In 2002, the township residents approved a 1-mill tax renewal which was used to start its police department in December ending a contract with Genesee County Sheriff Department. The department started with two full-time and four part-time officers. From 2004 to 2008, the 10 officer department issued over $516 thousand in tickets making it one of the top three in Genesee County not considering the City of Flint.

On November 3, 2009, a successful recall took place removing the township supervisor, Bruce Beatty, and two trustees, Glenn Huffman and Chuck Shinouskis.

Additional public safety millage request were placed on the ballot due to falling property value thus revenue from the original millage. In May 2011, a 2.2-mill public safety tax request for police and fire, was turned down at the ballot. Individual police and fire millage were on the ballot at February 2012 election with the 1.6 mills for police defeated and the 0.8 mills fire approved. The township made another attempt at a police millage with a 1.9 mill proposal on the November 3, 2015 ballot.

Clayton began receiving Karegnondi Water Authority water treated by Genesee County Drain Commission Water and Waste Division on December 15, 2017.

Years	Supervisor	Clerk	Treasurer	Trustees			
2004–2008	Roderick Shumaker	Sally Lurvey	Beth Perkins; Patti Mlynek (Interim)	Greg Childers	Glenn Huffman	Roger Meier	John Sayer
2008–2009	Bruce Beatty^{1. (11/3/2009)}	Dennis Milem	Natalie Dennings	Greg Childers	Jennifer Henry^{2. (5/12/2009)}	Glenn Huffman^{1. (11/3/2009)}	Chuck Shinouskis^{1. (11/3/2009)}
2009–2010	Roger Meier ^{3. (12/10/09)}	Dennis Milem	Natalie Dennings	Greg Childers	John Simor^{3. (7/09/09)}	John Sayer^{3. (12/10/09)}	Jane Wracan^{3. (12/10/09)}
2010–2011	Brian Sepanak	Dennis Milem	Natalie Dennings	Greg Childers	Rick Caruso	Chris Gehringer	Tammy Kapraun

1. Recalled. 2. Resigned. 3. Appointed.

== Geography ==
According to the United States Census Bureau, the township has a total area of 34.2 square miles (89 km^{2}), all land. The southeast corner is separated from the rest of the township by the city of Swartz Creek. Misteguay Creek has its headwaters in the township.

The Central Michigan Railway runs northeast toward Flushing and, ultimately, Saginaw, and southwest through Lennon toward Durand.

In the late 1980s, the township's land was mostly dedicated to farming. A few subdivisions existed on the north and east sides of the township, closer to urban areas, as well as one in the middle of the township. The Village of Lennon and Swartz Creek Meadows, a mobile home park near the village, were the other built-up areas.

Since then, several large farms have been turned into subdivisions, and large houses have been constructed in more rural sections.

== Government ==
Clayton has a Supervisor-Board style township government with elected supervisor, clerk, treasurer and four trustees. The township has its own police department.

The township and Swartz Creek City cooperate in operating the Swartz Creek Area Fire Department, which has one fire station in each of the two municipalities. The city's Perkins Library, which also serves Clayton and other Townships, is a branch of the Genesee District Library. Clayton is supply by Genesee County Drain Commission Water and Waste Division with treated Karegnondi Water Authority water. Clayton is supply by Karegnondi Water Authority water treated by Genesee County Drain Commission Water and Waste Division.

Clayton is part of or served by the following:

- Genesee County Commissioner District 8
- Michigan House of Representatives District 51
- State Senate District 32
- 67th District Court Division 4
- Michigan's 5th Congressional District
- Genesee District Library

District	Number	Officeholder
U.S. Representative	5	Dan Kildee
State Senate	27	Jim Ananich
State Representative	48th	Richard E. Hammel
	49	Vacant
County Commissioner	8th	Ted Henry
School district	Swartz Creek	Multiple: see article
	Flushing	Multiple: see article
Community College	C.S. Mott	Multiple: see article
Polling Locations		

== Demographics ==
Historical population
Census	Pop.	Note	%±
1870	1,047		—
1960	2,680		—
1970	5,305		97.9%
1980	7,269		37.0%
1990	7,368		1.4%
2000	7,546		2.4%
2010	7,581		0.5%
Source: 1873 Genesee County Atlas. Census Bureau. Census 1960- 2000, 2010.

At the 2010 census, there were 7,581 people, 2,897 households and 2,198 families residing in the township. The population density was 221.67 inhabitants per square mile (85.59/km^{2}). There were 3,097 housing units at an average density of 90.56 per square mile (34.97/km^{2}). The racial makeup of the township was 93.2% White, 3.2% African American, 0.5% Native American, 0.7% Asian, 0.1% from Native Hawaiian and Other Pacific Islander, 0.8% from other races, and 1.5% from two or more races. Hispanic or Latino of any race were 2.8% of the population.

There were 2,897 households, of which 20.6% had children under the age of 18 living with them, 63.7% were married couples living together, 8.7% had a female householder with no husband present, and 24.1% were non-families. 20.7% of all households were made up of individuals, and 9.5% had someone living alone who was 65 years of age or older. The average household size was 2.61 and the average family size was 3.01.
