= New Lothrop, Michigan =

- Village
- Village of New Lothrop
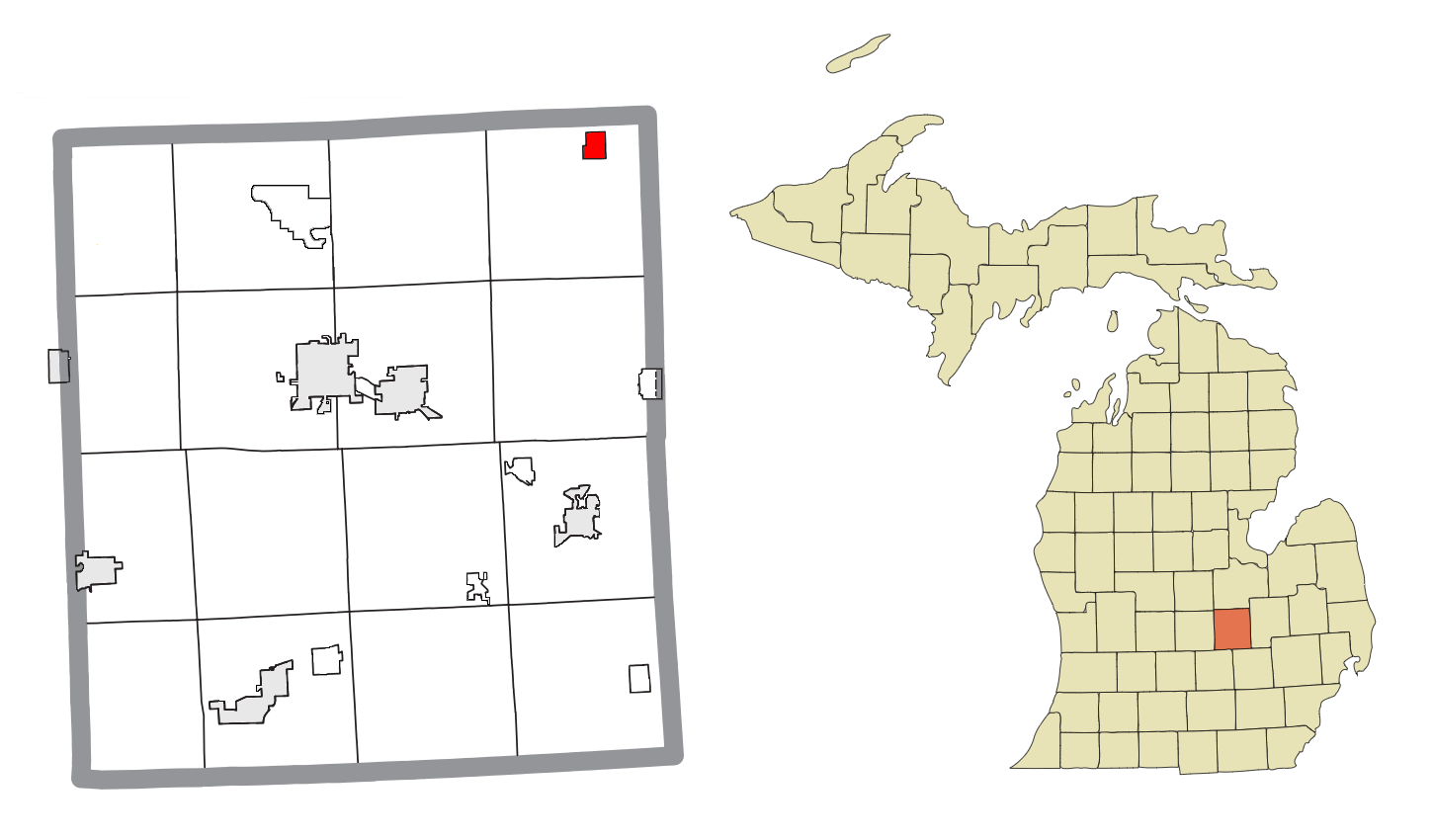
- Location within Shiawassee County

- Location within the state of Michigan
- Coordinates: 43°07′01″N 83°58′10″W
- Country: United States
- State: Michigan
- County: Shiawassee
- Township: Hazelton
- Incorporated: 1947

Government
  - Type: Village council
  - Mayor: Andy Wolford
  - Clerk: Karen Maksimchuck

Area
  - Total: 0.87 sq mi (2.25 km^{2})
  - Land: 0.86 sq mi (2.24 km^{2})
  - Water: 0.0039 sq mi (0.01 km^{2})
- Elevation: 696 ft (212 m)

Population (2020)
  - Total: 565
  - Density: 653.1/sq mi (252.17/km^{2})
- Time zone: UTC-5 (Eastern (EST))
  - Summer (DST): UTC-4 (EDT)
- ZIP code(s): 48460
- Area code: 810
- FIPS code: 26-57520
- GNIS feature ID: 2399473
- Website: Official website

New Lothrop is a village in Shiawassee County in the U.S. state of Michigan. The population was 565 at the 2020 census. The village is located within Hazelton Township.

== Geography ==
According to the United States Census Bureau, the village has a total area of 0.81 square miles (2.10 km^{2}), all land.

== Demographics ==
Historical population
Census	Pop.	Note	%±
1880	92		—
1950	459		—
1960	510		11.1%
1970	596		16.9%
1980	646		8.4%
1990	596		−7.7%
2000	603		1.2%
2010	581		−3.6%
2020	565		−2.8%
U.S. Decennial Census

=== 2010 census ===
As of the census of 2010, there were 581 people, 232 households, and 163 families living in the village. The population density was 717.3 inhabitants per square mile (277.0/km^{2}). There were 256 housing units at an average density of 316.0 per square mile (122.0/km^{2}). The racial makeup of the village was 95.4% White, 0.2% African American, 0.2% Native American, 1.5% Asian, 1.0% from other races, and 1.7% from two or more races. Hispanic or Latino of any race were 2.8% of the population.

There were 232 households, of which 31.9% had children under the age of 18 living with them, 56.5% were married couples living together, 11.6% had a female householder with no husband present, 2.2% had a male householder with no wife present, and 29.7% were non-families. 25.9% of all households were made up of individuals, and 9.5% had someone living alone who was 65 years of age or older. The average household size was 2.50 and the average family size was 3.02.

The median age in the village was 40.4 years. 22.9% of residents were under the age of 18; 8.9% were between the ages of 18 and 24; 25.5% were from 25 to 44; 27.2% were from 45 to 64; and 15.5% were 65 years of age or older. The gender makeup of the village was 47.8% male and 52.2% female.

=== 2000 census ===
As of the census of 2000, there were 603 people, 232 households, and 166 families living in the village. The population density was 765.0 inhabitants per square mile (295.4/km^{2}). There were 243 housing units at an average density of 308.3 per square mile (119.0/km^{2}). The racial makeup of the village was 96.68% White, 1.82% Native American, 0.17% from other races, and 1.33% from two or more races. Hispanic or Latino of any race were 0.33% of the population.

There were 232 households, out of which 38.8% had children under the age of 18 living with them, 59.5% were married couples living together, 11.2% had a female householder with no husband present, and 28.4% were non-families. 25.4% of all households were made up of individuals, and 7.8% had someone living alone who was 65 years of age or older. The average household size was 2.60 and the average family size was 3.12.

In the village, the population was spread out, with 28.7% under the age of 18, 7.8% from 18 to 24, 28.9% from 25 to 44, 24.4% from 45 to 64, and 10.3% who were 65 years of age or older. The median age was 35 years. For every 100 females, there were 93.3 males. For every 100 females age 18 and over, there were 90.3 males.

The median income for a household in the village was $40,227, and the median income for a family was $46,875. Males had a median income of $42,292 versus $20,000 for females. The per capita income for the village was $21,056. About 7.4% of families and 10.0% of the population were below the poverty line, including 11.8% of those under age 18 and 3.2% of those age 65 or over.
