= Shiawassee Township, Michigan =

- Civil township
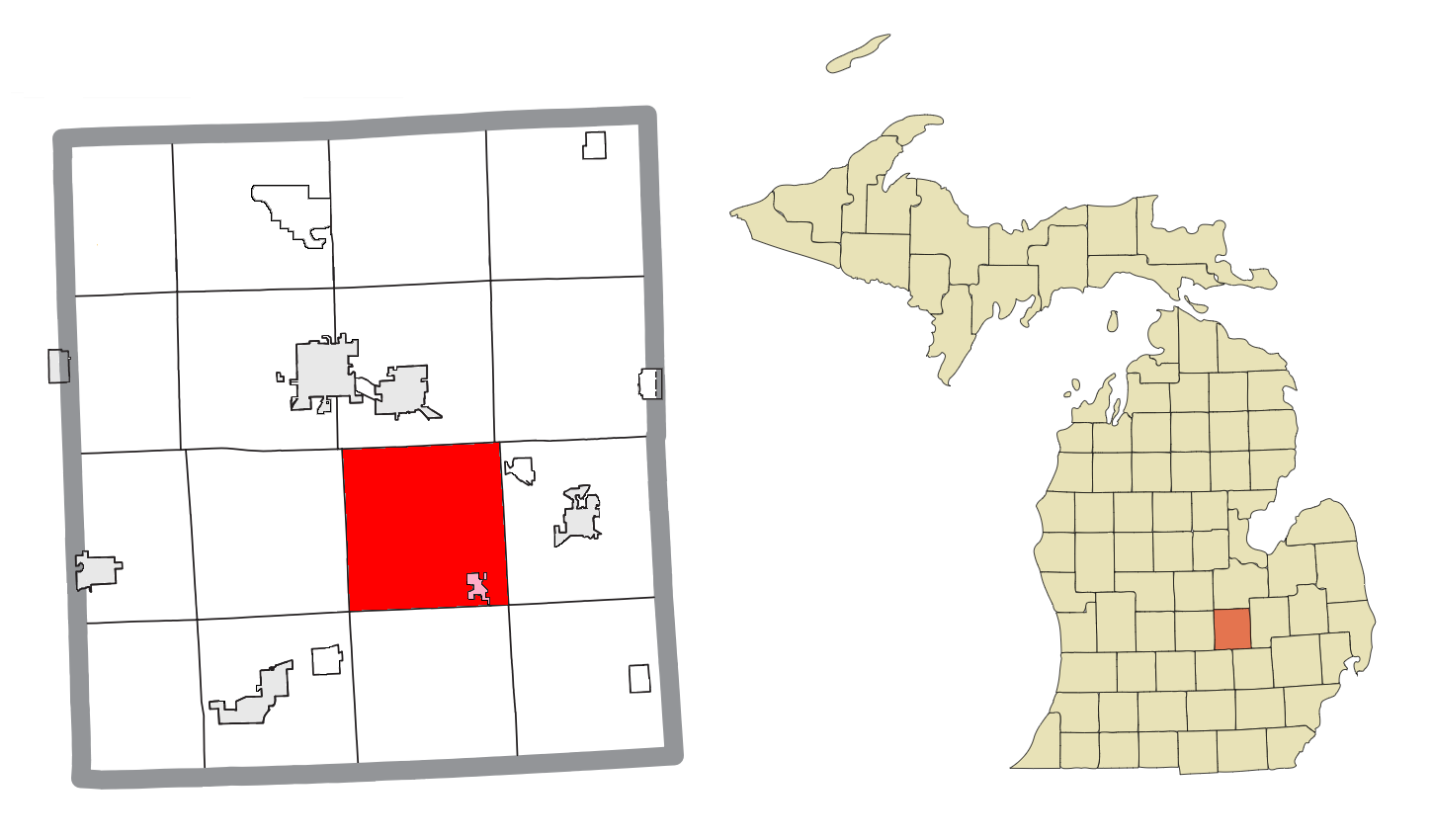
- Location within Shiawassee County (red) and the administered village of Bancroft (pink)

- Location within the state of Michigan Shiawassee Township (the United States)
- Coordinates: 42°54′02″N 84°05′17″W
- Country: United States
- State: Michigan
- County: Shiawassee

Government
  - Supervisor: Gerald Novak
  - Clerk: Chris Gaudette

Area
  - Total: 36.85 sq mi (95.4 km^{2})
  - Land: 36.39 sq mi (94.2 km^{2})
  - Water: 0.46 sq mi (1.2 km^{2})
- Elevation: 830 ft (253 m)

Population (2020)
  - Total: 2,740
  - Density: 75.3/sq mi (29.1/km^{2})
- Time zone: UTC-5 (Eastern (EST))
  - Summer (DST): UTC-4 (EDT)
- ZIP code(s): 48414 (Bancroft); 48429 (Durand); 48817 (Corunna); 48857 (Morrice); 48867 (Owosso)
- Area code: 989
- FIPS code: 26-73520
- GNIS feature ID: 1627080
- Website: Official website

Shiawassee Township is a civil township of Shiawassee County in the U.S. state of Michigan. The population was 2,740 at the 2020 census.

== Communities ==
- Bancroft is a village located in the southeast section of the township along Grand River Road and the railroad, southeast of Lansing Road at 42°52′43″N 84°3′50″W.
- Newburg is an unincorporated community in the township at Newburg and Bancroft roads, east of the Shiawassee River at 42°54′32″N 84°4′9″W. The community was named after Newburgh-on-the-Hudson, New York.
- Shiawasseetown is an unincorporated community within the township at Bancroft and Bennington roads. 42°55′46″N 84°04′46″W Charles Bacon from Ohio started a company to buy and sell land here. A plat was filed and recorded in 1836. On July 12, 1837, Lemuel Brown, postmaster, opened the post office as Shiawassee. On May 26, 1857, the Office was renamed Shiawassee Town. The city was planned as a possible state capital with 90 city blocks, two town squares and a park. The Shiawassee River in the community was dammed in the early 1900s for power. Most of the development never materialized.

== Geography ==
According to the United States Census Bureau, the township has a total area of 36.85 square miles (95.44 km^{2}), of which 36.39 square miles (94.25 km^{2}) is land and 0.46 square miles (1.19 km^{2}), or 1.25%, is water.

== Demographics ==
At the 2000 census, there were 2,907 people, 1,008 households and 815 families residing in the township. The population density was 79.2 inhabitants per square mile (30.6/km^{2}). There were 1,054 housing units at an average density of 28.7 per square mile (11.1/km^{2}). The racial makeup of the township was 97.25% White, 0.65% Native American, 0.10% Asian, 0.38% from other races, and 1.62% from two or more races. Hispanic or Latino of any race were 1.03% of the population.

There were 1,008 households, of which 37.6% had children under the age of 18 living with them, 68.6% were married couples living together, 8.0% had a female householder with no husband present, and 19.1% were non-families. 15.6% of all households were made up of individuals, and 6.2% had someone living alone who was 65 years of age or older. The average household size was 2.88 and the average family size was 3.20.

27.8% of the population were under the age of 18, 8.0% from 18 to 24, 28.8% from 25 to 44, 26.7% from 45 to 64, and 8.7% who were 65 years of age or older. The median age was 37 years. For every 100 females, there were 100.8 males. For every 100 females age 18 and over, there were 101.2 males.

The median household income was $48,220 and the median family income was $50,766. Males had a median income of $44,514 compared with $23,977 for females. The per capita income for the township was $19,713. About 4.2% of families and 6.1% of the population were below the poverty line, including 7.0% of those under age 18 and 3.0% of those age 65 or over.

== Highways ==
- I-69
- M-71
