= Lennon, Michigan =

- Village
- Village of Lennon
- Motto: Gateway to Two Counties
- Location within the state of Michigan
- Coordinates: 42°59′08″N 83°55′57″W
- Country: United States
- State: Michigan
- Counties: Genesee and Shiawassee
- Townships: Clayton and Venice
- Established: 1888

Government
  - Type: Village council
  - President: Barbara Baker Omerod
  - Clerk: Geraldine Terry
  - Treasurer: Larry Widigan

Area
  - Total: 0.92 sq mi (2.37 km^{2})
  - Land: 0.92 sq mi (2.37 km^{2})
  - Water: 0 sq mi (0.00 km^{2})
- Elevation: 784 ft (239 m)

Population (2020)
  - Total: 509
  - Density: 557.3/sq mi (215.17/km^{2})
- Time zone: UTC-5 (EST)
  - Summer (DST): UTC-4 (EDT)
- ZIP code(s): 48449
- Area codes: 810 and 989
- FIPS code: 26-46880
- GNIS feature ID: 2398419
- Website: Official website

Lennon is a village in the U.S. state of Michigan. As of the 2020 census, Lennon had a population of 509. The village is located along M-13 within Venice Township in Shiawassee County to the west and Clayton Township in Genesee County to the east.

== History ==
The village was founded by Peter Lennon. He got the Grand Trunk Western Railroad routed through the settlement and a depot built there. He built a grain elevator, which was followed by other businesses. A post office was established in Clayton Township, Genesee County in July 1880 with Lennon as the first postmaster. The office was transferred to Shiawassee County in February 1889.

== Geography ==
According to the United States Census Bureau, the village has an area of 0.92 square miles (2.38 km^{2}), all land.

Of the village's area, 0.68 square miles (1.76 km^{2}) and 429 residents are within Venice Township in Shiawassee County. The Clayton Township portion within Genesee County contains 0.24 square miles (0.62 km^{2}) and 82 residents at the 2010 census.

== Demographics ==
Historical population
Census	Pop.	Note	%±
1980	600		—
1990	534		−11.0%
2000	517		−3.2%
2010	511		−1.2%
2020	509		−0.4%
U.S. Decennial Census

=== 2010 census ===
As of the census of 2010, there were 511 people, 181 households, and 133 families living in the village. The population density was 561.5 inhabitants per square mile (216.8/km^{2}). There were 194 housing units at an average density of 213.2 per square mile (82.3/km^{2}). The racial makeup of the village was 94.5% White, 0.4% African American, 2.3% Native American, 1.0% Asian, 0.8% from other races, and 1.0% from two or more races. Hispanic or Latino of any race were 3.5% of the population.

There were 181 households, of which 33.7% had children under the age of 18 living with them, 60.8% were married couples living together, 7.7% had a female householder with no husband present, 5.0% had a male householder with no wife present, and 26.5% were non-families. 19.9% of all households were made up of individuals, and 8.9% had someone living alone who was 65 years of age or older. The average household size was 2.80 and the average family size was 3.22.

The median age in the village was 40.5 years. 24.3% of residents were under the age of 18; 8.4% were between the ages of 18 and 24; 22.2% were from 25 to 44; 31.5% were from 45 to 64; and 13.7% were 65 years of age or older. The gender makeup of the village was 51.9% male and 48.1% female.

=== 2000 census ===
As of the census of 2000, there were 517 people, 179 households, and 146 families living in the village. The population density was 560.7 inhabitants per square mile (216.5/km^{2}). There were 189 housing units at an average density of 205.0 per square mile (79.2/km^{2}). The racial makeup of the village was 98.26% White, 0.39% African American, 0.39% from other races, and 0.97% from two or more races. Hispanic or Latino of any race were 2.13% of the population.

There were 179 households, out of which 36.3% had children under the age of 18 living with them, 71.5% were married couples living together, 7.8% had a female householder with no husband present, and 17.9% were non-families. 14.0% of all households were made up of individuals, and 4.5% had someone living alone who was 65 years of age or older. The average household size was 2.87 and the average family size was 3.17.

In the village, the population was spread out, with 28.0% under the age of 18, 6.4% from 18 to 24, 30.6% from 25 to 44, 21.7% from 45 to 64, and 13.3% who were 65 years of age or older. The median age was 37 years. For every 100 females, there were 88.0 males. For every 100 females age 18 and over, there were 100.0 males.

The median income for a household in the village was $48,583, and the median income for a family was $50,227. Males had a median income of $40,972 versus $30,833 for females. The per capita income for the village was $17,148. About 2.1% of families and 5.2% of the population were below the poverty line, including none of those under age 18 and 10.7% of those age 65 or over.

== Highways ==
- M-13
