= List of tornadoes in the outbreak of May 26–31, 2013 =

This is a list of the confirmed tornadoes during the tornado outbreak of May 26–31, 2013.

== Confirmed tornadoes ==
Confirmed tornadoes by Enhanced Fujita rating
FU	EF0	EF1	EF2	EF3	EF4	EF5	Total
0	72	44	12	6	0	0	134

=== May 26 event ===
List of confirmed tornadoes – Sunday, May 26, 2013 (Note: All dates are based on the local time zone where the tornado touched down; however, all times are in Coordinated Universal Time for consistency.)
EF#	Location	County / Parish	State	Start Coord.	Time (UTC)	Path length	Max width	Summary
EF0	WNW of Mountain Home	Elmore	ID	43.1854°N 115.8833°W	2010–2015	3.92 mi (6.31 km)	50 yd (46 m)	A brief landspout tornado was confirmed by two Facebook photographs; no damage was reported.
EF0	WSW of Diagonal	Ringgold	IA	40.7901°N 94.3705°W	0023 – 0024	0.12 mi (0.19 km)	30 yd (27 m)	Law enforcement reported a brief tornado; no damage was reported.

=== May 27 event ===
List of confirmed tornadoes – Monday, May 27, 2013
EF#	Location	County / Parish	State	Start Coord.	Time (UTC)	Path length	Max width	Summary
EF0	N of Meeteetse	Park	WY	44.328°N 108.8266°W	1700 – 1718	6.27 mi (10.09 km)	20 yd (18 m)	A weak tornado was reported by Park County Sheriffs Office and was photographed from several vantage points; no damage was reported.
EF0	NW of Kimball	Kimball	NE	41.28°N 103.73°W	2005 – 2015	7.38 mi (11.88 km)	50 yd (46 m)	A weak tornado remained over open country, causing no damage.
EF0	NE of Kimball	Kimball	NE	41.30°N 103.57°W	2125 – 2128	5.43 mi (8.74 km)	50 yd (46 m)	A weak tornado remained over open country, causing no damage.
EF0	N of Arapahoe (1st tornado)	Cheyenne	CO	38.9441°N 102.1663°W	2138 – 2143	0.25 mi (0.40 km)	50 yd (46 m)	A landspout tornado remained nearly stationary over an open field, causing no damage.
EF0	N of Arapahoe (2nd tornado)	Cheyenne	CO	38.9441°N 102.1663°W	2149 – 2157	0.25 mi (0.40 km)	50 yd (46 m)	A second landspout tornado formed after the previous one dissipated and also remained nearly stationary over an open field, causing no damage.
EF0	SE of Harrison	Sioux	NE	42.5265°N 103.6614°W	2158 – 2203	2 mi (3.2 km)	50 yd (46 m)	A weak tornado remained over open country, causing no damage.
EF0	W of Hemingford	Box Butte	NE	42.32°N 103.4223°W	2205 – 2210	0.3 mi (0.48 km)	30 yd (27 m)	A weak tornado remained over open country, causing no damage.
EF0	N of Cheyenne Wells	Cheyenne	CO	38.92°N 102.35°W	2237 – 2243	0.25 mi (0.40 km)	50 yd (46 m)	A landspout tornado was observed on streaming video from a storm chaser; no damage was reported.
EF0	NW of Smith Center	Smith	KS	39.817°N 98.831°W	2332 – 2336	0.38 mi (0.61 km)	15 yd (14 m)	A tornado remained over open land, causing no damage.
EF0	S of Bellaire	Smith	KS	39.812°N 98.684°W	2345–2346	0.01 mi (0.016 km)	10 yd (9.1 m)	A brief tornado remained over open land, causing no damage.
EF3	N of Lebanon to N of Esbon	Smith, Jewell	KS	39.857°N 98.543°W	0004 – 0020	5.74 mi (9.24 km)	1,580 yd (1,440 m)	This slow-moving, large wedge low-end EF3 tornado significantly damaged a home, which had its roof completely removed, inflicted mostly minor damage to several other homes, and destroyed at least one shed. Many trees were downed and vehicles were damaged as well. One person was injured. The second model of the tornado intercept vehicle, designed by Sean Casey, intercepted the tornado. Instruments on the vehicle measured a gust of 175 mph (282 km/h) before the measuring equipment was destroyed, indicating that the tornado possibly reached EF4 intensity.
EF2	Edgar	Clay	NE	40.374°N 98.014°W	0032 – 0040	4.47 mi (7.19 km)	250 yd (230 m)	This strong low-end EF2 tornado touched down west of Edgar before moving directly through the center of the town. Numerous outbuildings, larger metal buildings, and grain silos were either damaged or destroyed. Several homes and businesses in town were damaged, a few of which lost their roofs. Trees and power poles were downed, and irrigation pivots were overturned before the tornado lifted east of Edgar.
EF0	N of Shea	Jefferson	NE	40.14°N 97.0196°W	0151 – 0156	3.28 mi (5.28 km)	100 yd (91 m)	Center pivot irrigation systems were overturned, and trees and farm outbuildings were damaged.
EF2	ESE of Harbine	Jefferson	NE	40.1798°N 96.9171°W	0202 – 0206	5.93 mi (9.54 km)	600 yd (550 m)	This low-end EF2 tornado destroyed five outbuildings, including a large recently well-built metal outbuilding. Four homes suffered minor damage, 2x4 boards were driven into the ground, irrigation pivots were overturned, and power poles were downed.
EF0	N of Beatrice	Gage	NE	40.2151°N 96.7607°W	0216 – 0220	1.36 mi (2.19 km)	100 yd (91 m)	A weak tornado caused minor damage to outbuildings and snapped tree limbs.
EF2	W of Marysville	Marshall	KS	39.834°N 96.737°W	0240 – 0245	3.83 mi (6.16 km)	150 yd (140 m)	A high-end EF2 tornado initially touched down as a weak tornado, overturning a grain bin. It moved generally northeast, severely damaging a John Deere dealership, where exterior walls were collapsed and a nearby metal building was destroyed. It then caused roof damage to a home and a barn, as well as sliding a garage off of its foundation and destroying it. Many trees were downed along the path.

=== May 28 event ===
List of confirmed tornadoes – Tuesday, May 28, 2013
EF#	Location	County / Parish	State	Start Coord.	Time (UTC)	Path length	Max width	Summary
EF0	NNW of Clear Lake	Beaver	OK	36.7996°N 100.33°W	2008 – 2011	0.82 mi (1.32 km)	25 yd (23 m)	A brief landspout tornado remained over grasslands, causing very little damage.
EF0	E of Forgan	Beaver	OK	36.903°N 100.4272°W	2029 – 2040	1.77 mi (2.85 km)	25 yd (23 m)	A landspout tornado formed over undeveloped grassland, causing little damage.
EF3	W of Corning (1st tornado)	Nemaha	KS	39.6676°N 96.1213°W	2116 – 2134	4.4 mi (7.1 km)	900 yd (820 m)	A large, slow-moving intense tornado destroyed a home, nearly flattened an older home, rolled a vehicle, and tossed heavy farm equipment. Several outbuildings were either damaged or destroyed and trees and power poles were downed as well.
EF1	W of Corning (2nd tornado)	Nemaha	KS	39.6528°N 96.0712°W	2120	0.01 mi (0.016 km)	50 yd (46 m)	This brief tornado formed as a satellite to the EF3 Corning event. Moderate damage was reported in association with this tornado.
EF0	W of Porter	Sioux	NE	42.08°N 103.73°W	2123 – 2138	6.31 mi (10.15 km)	75 yd (69 m)	A weak tornado caused no damage.
EF1	NE of Corning	Nemaha	KS	39.6599°N 96.016°W	2145	0.01 mi (0.016 km)	50 yd (46 m)	A brief tornado, which spun-up after the large EF3 tornado dissipated, downed trees and damaged a home.
EF0	NE of Lake Alice	Box Butte	NE	42.13°N 103.42°W	2205 – 2210	2.16 mi (3.48 km)	50 yd (46 m)	An intermittent tornado, which came from the same storm that produced the Sioux County EF0 tornado, caused no damage.
EF0	NNE of Culver	Ottawa	KS	39.0232°N 97.7218°W	2233	0.01 mi (0.016 km)	25 yd (23 m)	A very brief rope tornado caused no damage. The same storm would produce the EF3 Bennington tornado below.
EF3	W of Bennington	Ottawa	KS	39.0376°N 97.709°W	2245 – 2345	2.33 mi (3.75 km)	1,000 yd (910 m)	See section on this tornado – Officially listed as an EF3 tornado based on damage surveys; however, based on data from mobile Doppler radar, meteorologists at the National Weather Service office in Topeka, Kansas strongly believe the tornado was of EF4 intensity.
EF1	SE of Allen	Bennett	SD	43.2702°N 101.9137°W	0013 – 0014	0.1 mi (0.16 km)	20 yd (18 m)	A mobile home was rolled down a hill and a stick-built house had its roof ripped off and several walls knocked down.
EF1	NE of Cranesville	Erie	PA	41.92°N 80.30°W	2335 – 2340	1.69 mi (2.72 km)	50 yd (46 m)	A low-end EF1 tornado overturned and destroyed a mobile home, injuring all five occupants. A couple of farm buildings were heavily damaged, and many trees were downed as well.
EF0	E of Albert	Barton	KS	38.45°N 99.01°W	2337 – 2344	4.18 mi (6.73 km)	50 yd (46 m)	An almost stationary rope tornado formed near the Barton–Rush County line; it remained over open fields and caused no damage.
EF0	S of Otis	Rush	KS	38.5011°N 99.05°W	2340 – 2345	0.62 mi (1.00 km)	75 yd (69 m)	A brief rope tornado caused no damage.
EF0	SW of Bootleg	Deaf Smith	TX	34.7897°N 102.961°W	2345 – 2350	2.14 mi (3.44 km)	75 yd (69 m)	A rope tornado caused no damage.
EF1	N of Edinboro to SE of Union City	Erie	PA	41.90°N 80.13°W	2353 – 0020	17.83 mi (28.69 km)	150 yd (140 m)	An intermittent tornado downed many trees, several of which fell onto houses. Other houses suffered roof and siding damage unrelated to trees. Other damage that was observed along the path was found to have been the result of a downburst. Two people were injured by the tornado.
EF0	NW of Woodhull Township	Shiawassee	MI	42.832°N 84.181°W	0047 – 0049	0.74 mi (1.19 km)	60 yd (55 m)	Trees were uprooted, and shingles were ripped from a church roof.
EF0	Southern Morrice	Shiawassee	MI	42.832°N 84.181°W	0052 – 0053	0.5 mi (0.80 km)	100 yd (91 m)	Many trees were downed over the south part of Morrice.
EF1	N of Flint	Genesee	MI	43.0671°N 83.7173°W	0101 – 0106	2.28 mi (3.67 km)	400 yd (370 m)	Many trees were downed, and several older commercial buildings were damaged.
EF1	SSE of Bancroft to ENE of Gaines	Shiawassee, Genesee	MI	42.83°N 84.029°W	0109 – 0124	9.89 mi (15.92 km)	550 yd (500 m)	Roof and siding were torn off of a home, an old barn was destroyed, and another barn lost all of its roof. Several other structures sustained roof damage and many trees were downed.
EF0	NE of Mazon	Grundy	IL	41.2565°N 88.3852°W	0118 – 0120	1.85 mi (2.98 km)	20 yd (18 m)	Doors were blown off of an outbuilding and trees and power poles were downed.
EF0	Brokenstraw Township	Warren	PA	41.8863°N 79.3588°W	0125 – 0129	2.76 mi (4.44 km)	50 yd (46 m)	A brief tornado embedded within a larger area of damaging straight-line winds downed about 400 trees and destroyed an outbuilding. A church, four houses, and an outbuilding were also damaged.
EF2	NNW of Fenton	Genesee	MI	42.8519°N 83.7734°W	0130 – 0141	5.1 mi (8.2 km)	500 yd (460 m)	Several homes suffered significant damage, including loss of roofs, and many trees were downed.
EF2	SE of Grand Blanc	Genesee	MI	42.896°N 83.574°W	0154 – 0206	4.61 mi (7.42 km)	300 yd (270 m)	A high-end EF2 tornado nearly destroyed a house while a garage and several other buildings were completely destroyed.
EF1	WSW of Scandia	Warren	PA	41.9116°N 79.0867°W	0158 – 0206	4.22 mi (6.79 km)	100 yd (91 m)	An intermittent tornado damaged two homes and downed about 500 trees.
EF0	NW of Walcott	Deaf Smith	TX	34.9936°N 102.921°W	0206 – 0211	2.06 mi (3.32 km)	150 yd (140 m)	A short-lived tornado caused no damage.

=== May 29 event ===
List of confirmed tornadoes – Wednesday, May 29, 2013
EF#	Location	County / Parish	State	Start Coord.	Time (UTC)	Path length	Max width	Summary
EF0	NE of Rangely	Rio Blanco	CO	40.1965°N 108.3272°W	1550 – 1610	1 mi (1.6 km)	40 yd (37 m)	A tornado was photographed by people up to 25 miles (40 km) away. It picked up dirt and vegetable debris but otherwise did not cause damage.
EF0	NNE of Clay Center (1st tornado)	Clay	NE	40.546°N 98.046°W	1956 – 2000	0.49 mi (0.79 km)	25 yd (23 m)	A short-lived tornado caused no damage.
EF0	NE of Quitaque	Briscoe	TX	34.38°N 100.99°W	2030 – 2035	0.68 mi (1.09 km)	50 yd (46 m)	Minor damage was inflicted to a barn.
EF0	S of Russell Springs	Russell	KS	38.83°N 101.18°W	2035 – 2036	0.1 mi (0.16 km)	25 yd (23 m)	Emergency management observed a short-lived landspout tornado; no damage was reported.
EF0	SW of Turkey	Hall	TX	34.3759°N 100.9094°W	2044 – 2046	0.56 mi (0.90 km)	50 yd (46 m)	Members of the Turkey Fire Department observed a landspout tornado; no damage was reported.
EF0	N of Sutton	Clay	NE	40.692°N 97.86°W	2045	0.01 mi (0.016 km)	15 yd (14 m)	A brief tornado caused no damage.
EF0	S of Bradshaw	York	NE	40.855°N 97.75°W	2120	0.01 mi (0.016 km)	15 yd (14 m)	A brief tornado caused no damage.
EF1	NNE of Clay Center (2nd tornado)	Clay	NE	40.554°N 98.038°W	2121 – 2129	4.34 mi (6.98 km)	75 yd (69 m)	Metal panels were ripped from the roof and walls of an outbuilding and a home sustained minor damage.
EF1	NW of York	York	NE	40.913°N 97.636°W	2136 – 2200	8.39 mi (13.50 km)	150 yd (140 m)	Outbuildings, grain bins, and a garage were heavily damaged or destroyed and a few homes also sustained minor damage. Trees were uprooted, power poles were snapped, and irrigation pivots were overturned as well.
EF0	W of Comstock	Custer	NE	41.56°N 99.26°W	2146	0.25 mi (0.40 km)	35 yd (32 m)	A brief tornado caused no damage.
EF1	E of York	York	NE	40.799°N 97.587°W	2148 – 2220	15.93 mi (25.64 km)	400 yd (370 m)	Two outbuildings were damaged or destroyed, irrigation pivots were overturned, and trees and power poles were snapped.
EF1	W of Calumet	Canadian	OK	35.6°N 98.2268°W	2200	0.2 mi (0.32 km)	20 yd (18 m)	A barn was destroyed, and a house was damaged.
EF0	E of Grinnell	Gove	KS	39.1362°N 100.5632°W	2243–2245	1.3 mi (2.1 km)	25 yd (23 m)	A storm chaser observed a small rope tornado; no damage was reported.
EF0	E of Garnavillo, IA to Patch Grove, WI	Clayton (IA), Grant (WI)	IA, WI	42.8682°N 91.2178°W	2246 – 2254	6.38 mi (10.27 km)	10 yd (9.1 m)	A few campers and buildings were damaged and trees were downed.
EF2	SSE of Florida to Schenectady	Montgomery, Schenectady	NY	42.8457°N 74.2034°W	2247 – 2304	12.8 mi (20.6 km)	1,760 yd (1,610 m)	A very large tornado, which was up to a 1 mi (1.6 km) wide, tore the roofs off of several structures, downed a large number of trees, and toppled high-tension power line towers. One person was injured.
EF1	S of Summit	Schoharie	NY	42.5262°N 74.579°W	2257 – 2302	1.57 mi (2.53 km)	200 yd (180 m)	Many trees were downed.
EF0	NE of Rising City	Butler	NE	41.23°N 97.26°W	2300 – 2305	0.64 mi (1.03 km)	25 yd (23 m)	Emergency management reported a tornado that caused no damage.
EF0	WNW of Elba	Howard	NE	41.3161°N 98.7156°W	2305	0.01 mi (0.016 km)	15 yd (14 m)	A brief tornado did not cause damage.
EF0	SW of Bartlett	Wheeler	NE	41.85°N 98.59°W	2308	0.2 mi (0.32 km)	35 yd (32 m)	A brief tornado caused no damage.
EF1	Vischer Ferry	Saratoga	NY	42.7865°N 73.8085°W	2310–2311	0.75 mi (1.21 km)	200 yd (180 m)	The roof was torn off of a shed, windows were blown out of a house, and a barn was shifted off of its foundation. About 100 trees were downed along the path as well.
EF1	Southwestern Norman	Cleveland	OK	35.1907°N 97.4535°W	2342	0.1 mi (0.16 km)	10 yd (9.1 m)	A house was damaged.
EF0	SW of Lakin (1st tornado)	Kearny	KS	37.76°N 101.44°W	2350–2353	0.28 mi (0.45 km)	75 yd (69 m)	A trained storm spotter observed a tornado lifting dirt but causing no damage.
EF0	SW of Lakin (2nd tornado)	Kearny	KS	37.77°N 101.47°W	0000–0012	0.3 mi (0.48 km)	100 yd (91 m)	Members of the public observed a tornado; no damage was reported.
EF0	SSW of Lakin	Kearny	KS	37.7666°N 101.387°W	0020–0023	0.12 mi (0.19 km)	75 yd (69 m)	A National Weather Service employee observed a tornado lifting dirt but causing no damage.
EF0	S of Erick	Beckham	OK	35.033°N 99.884°W	0021–0023	0.75 mi (1.21 km)	150 yd (140 m)	A storm chaser observed a dust-filled tornado that caused no known damage.
EF1	Southeastern Prairie View	Phillips	KS	39.818°N 99.578°W	0110 – 0112	0.78 mi (1.26 km)	40 yd (37 m)	A low-end EF1 tornado embedded within a larger area of damaging straight-line winds struck a farmstead, damaging or destroying three outbuildings, snapping tree limbs, and inflicting window damage to a home.

=== May 30 event ===
List of confirmed tornadoes – Thursday, May 30, 2013
EF#	Location	County / Parish	State	Start Coord.	Time (UTC)	Path length	Max width	Summary
EF1	N of Rocky	Polk	AR	34.6241°N 94.3696°W	1908 – 1909	0.8 mi (1.3 km)	200 yd (180 m)	A shed was destroyed, a metal barn lost its roof, and the roof of a house was damaged. Many large trees were downed as well.
EF2	Oden	Montgomery	AR	34.6017°N 93.8294°W	2000 – 2007	3.37 mi (5.42 km)	400 yd (370 m)	A house had its roof removed, while another house was damaged. Several outbuildings were either damaged or destroyed and numerous trees were downed. Two people were injured.
EF1	SE of Kirby	Pike	AR	34.212°N 93.568°W	2003 – 2007	1.48 mi (2.38 km)	300 yd (270 m)	Trees were downed, and deer stands were knocked over.
EF0	Perkins	Payne	OK	35.9619°N 97.0395°W	2008–2009	0.26 mi (0.42 km)	100 yd (91 m)	A short-lived tornado that was reported via KWTV lasted about 30 seconds, causing no damage.
EF0	E of Perkins	Payne	OK	35.98°N 96.94°W	2015 – 2016	0.71 mi (1.14 km)	100 yd (91 m)	A tornado was reported via KWTV; no damage occurred.
EF2	E of Rosboro to NW of Bonnerdale	Pike, Clark, Montgomery, Hot Spring	AR	34.2834°N 93.4865°W	2016 – 2035	9 mi (14 km)	300 yd (270 m)	A mobile home was destroyed, a large metal barn was badly damaged, and a house suffered roof damage. Numerous trees and power poles were downed as well. Three people were injured north of Amity.
EF0	Ripley	Payne	OK	36.0145°N 96.8835°W	2026 – 2030	1.64 mi (2.64 km)	200 yd (180 m)	A tornado developed under a large revolving bowl wall cloud. Although debris was noted; no damage was reported.
EF1	NW of Mountain Pine	Garland	AR	34.6020°N 93.2640°W	2035 – 2051	8.7 mi (14.0 km)	300 yd (270 m)	This tornado began as a waterspout over Lake Ouachita before moving onshore about 1.5 mi (2.4 km) west of Lena Landing. Numerous trees were downed by the tornado, resulting in damage to a house and several cabins.
EF2	SE of Watson, OK to NE of Cove, AR	McCurtain OK), Polk (AR)	OK, AR	34.3652°N 94.4992°W	2035 – 2055	8.6 mi (13.8 km)	800 yd (730 m)	This tornado downed many trees in McCurtain County before crossing the Oklahoma–Arkansas state line. There, more trees were knocked down, some of which fell on and damaged mobile homes and site-built homes, and a barn was destroyed. Vehicles were damaged and power lines were downed as well.
EF0	NNW of Cushing	Payne	OK	36.0335°N 96.7874°W	2037 – 2038	0.37 mi (0.60 km)	50 yd (46 m)	A trained storm spotter observed a brief tornado; no damage was reported.
EF1	W of Royal	Garland	AR	34.4672°N 93.3209°W	2049 – 2108	7.16 mi (11.52 km)	300 yd (270 m)	This tornado touched down southwest of Royal, destroying a few barns and outbuildings. Several homes sustained roof damage and one had an addition added on room destroyed. A mobile home and two travel trailers were overturned, and another mobile home had one end ripped off. Several trees were downed, one of which crushed a van and another of which fell onto a mobile home. The tornado then lifted north of Royal.
EF0	NNW of Oilton	Creek	OK	36.1268°N 96.604°W	2101	0.1 mi (0.16 km)	50 yd (46 m)	Storm chasers reported a brief tornado over open country; no known damage occurred.
EF1	Conesville	Muscatine	IA	41.3677°N 91.354°W	2110 – 2112	2.43 mi (3.91 km)	100 yd (91 m)	Trees were downed and a mobile home lost part of its roof.
EF1	ESE of Wickes	Polk	AR	34.2776°N 94.3015°W	2132 – 2136	2.43 mi (3.91 km)	200 yd (180 m)	A home suffered roof damage and the metal roof of a shed was torn off. Many trees were downed, a few of which crushed mobile homes, and large trees were downed.
EF1	Andalusia, IL to NE of Buffalo, IA	Rock Island (IL), Scott (IA)	IL, IA	41.4345°N 90.7256°W	2144 – 2147	3.96 mi (6.37 km)	150 yd (140 m)	Large trees were downed, some of which fell onto houses. The tornado crossed the Mississippi River, briefly becoming a waterspout as well.
EF0	SW of Prophetstown	Whiteside	IL	41.657°N 89.9809°W	2235 – 2236	0.57 mi (0.92 km)	25 yd (23 m)	A brief, weak tornado caused no damage.
EF0	NE of Pernell	Garvin	OK	34.565°N 97.501°W	2258–2259	0.41 mi (0.66 km)	200 yd (180 m)	A trained storm spotter observed a brief, rain-wrapped tornado; no damage was reported.
EF1	W of Norman	Montgomery	AR	34.4496°N 93.8027°W	2310 – 2316	3.22 mi (5.18 km)	200 yd (180 m)	Numerous trees were downed and a hay barn was badly damaged.
EF0	WSW of Mazie	Mayes	OK	36.0813°N 95.419°W	2349	0.1 mi (0.16 km)	50 yd (46 m)	A brief tornado caused no damage.
EF0	WSW of Mazie	Mayes	OK	36.0936°N 95.3985°W	2354	0.1 mi (0.16 km)	50 yd (46 m)	A brief tornado caused no damage.
EF0	ENE of Mazie	Mayes	OK	36.1009°N 95.3669°W	0008–0009	0.6 mi (0.97 km)	100 yd (91 m)	A brief tornado caused no damage.
EF1	SE of Murphy	Mayes	OK	36.1233°N 95.2282°W	0024 – 0030	2.1 mi (3.4 km)	200 yd (180 m)	Several trees were downed.
EF1	NW of Paron	Saline	AR	34.7876°N 92.8137°W	0046 – 0050	1.72 mi (2.77 km)	250 yd (230 m)	The roof was torn off of a church with of several houses also sustaining roof damage. A motor home was damaged, several outbuildings were either damaged or destroyed, and many trees were downed.
EF2	SE of Broken Arrow to NE of Oneta	Tulsa, Wagoner	OK	36.0224°N 95.7729°W	0140 – 0154	5.6 mi (9.0 km)	450 yd (410 m)	This tornado destroyed barns, damaged homes, and downed trees before moving into Wagoner County. There, the tornado reached high-end EF2 strength, severely damaging metal buildings, a gas station, and dozens of homes, several of which lost their roofs and another that lost its second story. The tornado continued eastward, damaging more homes and a large brick building, destroying a wood-framed outbuilding, and downing more trees before lifting.
EF1	NNE of Maumelle	Pulaski	AR	34.8896°N 92.3925°W	0213 – 0214	0.16 mi (0.26 km)	150 yd (140 m)	A brief tornado on the north side of a larger area of damaging straight-line winds moved a mobile home off of its foundation, blew in doors and a wall of a metal building, and downed many trees.
EF1	S of Tull	Grant	AR	34.4355°N 92.5823°W	0236 – 0237	0.36 mi (0.58 km)	200 yd (180 m)	1 death – A brief tornado downed many trees, one of which fell on a car, killing the driver. A couple of homes suffered minor roof damage as well.

=== May 31 event ===
List of confirmed tornadoes – Friday, May 31, 2013
EF#	Location	County / Parish	State	Start Coord.	Time (UTC)	Path length	Max width	Summary
EF1	NW of Pamona	Howell	MO	36.8588°N 92.0101°W	0520 – 0525	4.28 mi (6.89 km)	400 yd (370 m)	Hundreds of trees were downed and a machine shed was damaged.
EF1	SW of Brinkley	Monroe	AR	34.8231°N 91.2550°W	0535 – 0536	0.36 mi (0.58 km)	100 yd (91 m)	A brief tornado caused minor roof damage to a building and downed many trees in a cemetery.
EF1	NE of Brinkley	Monroe, St. Francis	AR	34.8869°N 91.1708°W	0550 – 0557	3.31 mi (5.33 km)	200 yd (180 m)	The roof was partially removed from a house and a few other buildings suffered minor roof damage. Several trees were downed and a couple of tractor-trailers were blown over on I-40 as well. One person suffered minor injuries.
EF1	NW of Covington	Tipton	TN	35.6159°N 89.7031°W	1105 – 1109	0.83 mi (1.34 km)	250 yd (230 m)	Two houses suffered significant damage, grain bins were damaged, and a shop was destroyed. Trees were downed as well.
EF0	WSW of Oakwood	Walsh	ND	48.42°N 97.31°W	1853	0.1 mi (0.16 km)	25 yd (23 m)	A brief tornado caused no reported damage.
EF0	NE of Grafton	Walsh	ND	48.44°N 97.32°W	1917 – 1925	2.25 mi (3.62 km)	25 yd (23 m)	A tornado moved along an intermittent path; no damage was reported.
EF0	W of Independence	Montgomery	KS	37.23°N 95.77°W	2118 – 2120	0.42 mi (0.68 km)	50 yd (46 m)	A brief tornado caused no reported damage.
EF0	NE of Omega	Kingfisher	OK	35.8802°N 98.1874°W	2235 – 2237	1 mi (1.6 km)	50 yd (46 m)	Broadcast media and Spotter Network observed a tornado that caused no damage.
EF0	SSW of Calumet	Canadian	OK	35.4987°N 98.12°W	2255 – 2256	0.35 mi (0.56 km)	30 yd (27 m)	Minor tree damage and a convergent wheat pattern was observed.
EF3	WSW of El Reno to W of Yukon	Canadian	OK	35.485°N 98.096°W	2303 – 2344	16.2 mi (26.1 km)	4,576 yd (4,184 m)	8 deaths – See article on this tornado – An erratic and record-breaking tornado, the widest in world history at 2.6 miles (4.2 km), occurred south of El Reno. The tornado featured multiple sub-vortices with winds in excess of 302 miles per hour (486 km/h), as well as additional satellite tornadoes nearby. All eight deaths occurred in vehicles, including members of the TWISTEX team. Another 26 people were injured. Although radar-measured winds far exceeded EF5 threshold, damage indicators which form the basis of the Enhanced Fujita scale only supported EF3 strength across a largely rural area.
EF0	N of Floyd	Floyd	IA	43.1691°N 92.7323°W	2309–2310	0.18 mi (0.29 km)	10 yd (9.1 m)	A brief tornado caused no reported damage.
EF0	NW of Union City	Canadian	OK	35.44°N 98.003°W	2312–2313	0.5 mi (0.80 km)	120 yd (110 m)	Storm chasers and the RaXPol mobile research radar observed a brief satellite tornado rotating around the primary El Reno tornado; no damage was reported.
EF0	SSW of El Reno	Canadian	OK	35.459°N 98.011°W	2313–2314	0.5 mi (0.80 km)	350 yd (320 m)	Storm chasers and the RaXPol mobile research radar observed a brief satellite tornado rotating around the primary El Reno tornado; no damage was reported.
EF0	NW of Hulah	Osage	OK	36.9451°N 96.0678°W	2318	0.1 mi (0.16 km)	50 yd (46 m)	A brief tornado in open country caused no damage.
EF0	SSW of Montgomery City	Montgomery	MO	38.9424°N 91.5188°W	2320 – 2321	0.53 mi (0.85 km)	30 yd (27 m)	A brief tornado snapped power poles and downed many trees, including one that fell onto a parked school bus.
EF0	S of Montgomery City	Montgomery	MO	38.944°N 91.502°W	2321 – 2322	0.21 mi (0.34 km)	30 yd (27 m)	A brief downed many trees and blew the roof off of a machine shed.
EF0	NNW of New Florence	Montgomery	MO	38.939°N 91.460°W	2328 – 2330	1.06 mi (1.71 km)	40 yd (37 m)	Many trees were downed, and a home suffered minor siding and soffit damage.
EF2	SE of El Reno	Canadian	OK	35.4858°N 97.8511°W	2329 – 2341	5 mi (8.0 km)	150 yd (140 m)	A rare, long-lived anticyclonic tornado formed as a satellite tornado to the main El Reno tornado. Some structures and trees were damaged.
EF1	WSW of Pawhuska	Osage	OK	36.6154°N 96.6006°W	2330 – 2337	2.5 mi (4.0 km)	200 yd (180 m)	A tornado remained over mostly open country, although two power poles were snapped.
EF1	NE of Copan	Washington	OK	36.9623°N 95.8343°W	2338 – 2340	1.2 mi (1.9 km)	200 yd (180 m)	A home suffered roof damage and several trees were downed.
EF1	NNE of Mustang to western Oklahoma City	Canadian, Oklahoma	OK	35.454°N 97.699°W	2351 – 0009	5.71 mi (9.19 km)	600 yd (550 m)	A large, slow-moving tornado formed in southwestern Oklahoma City, just to the north of Will Rogers World Airport. Buildings, homes, businesses, trees and powerlines were damaged and many vehicles were overturned on I-44.
EF0	S of El Reno	Canadian	OK	35.4432°N 97.96°W	2355 – 2357	0.47 mi (0.76 km)	50 yd (46 m)	A trained storm spotter reported a tornado, although any damage it caused was indiscernible from the El Reno EF3 tornado.
EF0	ESE of South Coffeyville	Nowata	OK	36.9873°N 95.4317°W	0021 – 0022	1.1 mi (1.8 km)	310 yd (280 m)	Numerous trees were downed.
EF0	N of Templeton	Benton	IN	40.5356°N 87.2048°W	0030 – 0032	0.5 mi (0.80 km)	20 yd (18 m)	Emergency management reported a tornado over open fields; no damage was reported.
EF0	SW of Del City	Oklahoma	OK	35.411°N 97.457°W	0035 – 0037	0.5 mi (0.80 km)	200 yd (180 m)	Trees and power lines were damaged.
EF1	SW of Union	Franklin	MO	38.4095°N 91.0509°W	0037–0050	9.98 mi (16.06 km)	500 yd (460 m)	Damage was confined to downed trees.
EF1	W of Moore	Cleveland	OK	35.341°N 97.609°W	0042 – 0043	1 mi (1.6 km)	100 yd (91 m)	Several homes, trees, power poles, and power lines were damaged.
EF0	NNE of Tuttle	Grady	OK	35.321°N 97.799°W	0045	0.2 mi (0.32 km)	50 yd (46 m)	Two storm chasers filmed a tornado; no known damage occurred.
EF3	SW of Weldon Spring to Riverview	St. Charles, St. Louis, St. Louis City	MO	38.6867°N 90.7498°W	0050 – 0125	31.8 mi (51.2 km)	1,760 yd (1,610 m)	See section on this tornado – Two people suffered minor injuries in St. Charles County.
EF1	Southwestern Oklahoma City	Oklahoma	OK	35.406°N 97.551°W	0053 – 0055	1.13 mi (1.82 km)	300 yd (270 m)	Roofs and trees were damaged.
EF1	ESE of Catawissa	Jefferson	MO	38.4013°N 90.7322°W	0101–0118	12.41 mi (19.97 km)	200 yd (180 m)	Damage was confined to downed trees.
EF3	NE of Bellefontaine Neighbors, MO to N of Edwardsville, IL	St. Louis (MO), Madison (IL)	MO, IL	38.8009°N 90.1493°W	0127 – 0137	10.6 mi (17.1 km)	150 yd (140 m)	See Section on this tornado.
EF1	NW of Talala to SW of Watova	Rogers, Nowata	OK	36.5886°N 95.7326°W	0121 – 0126	3.5 mi (5.6 km)	320 yd (290 m)	A high-end EF1 tornado downed many trees.
EF1	NNE of Talala to ENE of Watova	Rogers, Nowata	OK	36.5972°N 95.6760°W	0127 – 0135	4.8 mi (7.7 km)	350 yd (320 m)	This high-end EF1 tornado developed immediately after the previous one dissipated. A mobile home and a barn were destroyed, several homes were damaged, and numerous trees were downed. Two people were injured.
EF2	Gillespie	Macoupin	IL	39.1287°N 89.8272°W	0149 – 0152	1.47 mi (2.37 km)	150 yd (140 m)	A low-end EF2 tornado moved through Gillespie. Several homes and a school gymnasium sustained extensive roof and wall damage, three garages were destroyed, and many trees and power poles were downed.
EF1	SW of Zanesville to ESE of Waggoner	Montgomery	IL	39.3309°N 89.6815°W	0200 – 0206	4.26 mi (6.86 km)	50 yd (46 m)	Numerous large trees were snapped, barns, outbuildings, and machine sheds were severely damaged, and three tractor trailers were blown over on I-55. The windows were blown in at a two-story farm house as well.
EF1	Northwestern Decatur	Macon	IL	39.8586°N 88.9856°W	0303 – 0307	1.99 mi (3.20 km)	100 yd (91 m)	A television shop lost its roof and sustained broken windows and siding damage while other structures sustained minor roof damage. Numerous trees were downed as well.
EF0	SW of Grove	Delaware	OK	36.5379°N 94.8236°W	0423 – 0427	1.8 mi (2.9 km)	500 yd (460 m)	Many trees were downed.
EF1	NNW of Meeks	Vermilion	IL	40.0232°N 87.5961°W	0424 – 0425	0.49 mi (0.79 km)	70 yd (64 m)	A home's garage was pulled from its foundation and pushed about 10 feet (3.0 m) on top of the car inside, severely damaging it and part of the house. A large barn was also damaged, and several trees were splintered.

== See also ==
- Tornadoes of 2013
- Tornado outbreak of May 26–31, 2013
- List of United States tornadoes in May 2013
