= List of United States tornadoes in May 2013 =

This is a list of all tornadoes that were confirmed by local offices of the National Weather Service in the United States in May 2013.

== United States yearly total ==
Confirmed tornadoes by Enhanced Fujita rating
EFU	EF0	EF1	EF2	EF3	EF4	EF5	Total
0	499	309	80	19	8	1	916

== May ==
Confirmed tornadoes by Enhanced Fujita rating
EFU	EF0	EF1	EF2	EF3	EF4	EF5	Total
0	154	87	16	8	3	1	269

=== May 2 event ===
List of confirmed tornadoes – Thursday, May 2, 2013 (Note: All dates are based on the local time zone where the tornado touched down; however, all times are in Coordinated Universal Time for consistency.)
EF#	Location	County	State	Start Coord.	Time (UTC)	Path length	Max width	Summary
EF0	NE of Boca Raton	Palm Beach	FL	26.3754°N 80.0834°W	1725 – 1727	0.4 mi (0.64 km)	50 yd (46 m)	A piece of a metal-covered foam roof was blown through a house window and a store sign was damaged. Trees, fences, and power lines were downed as well.

=== May 4 event ===
List of confirmed tornadoes – Saturday, May 4, 2013
EF#	Location	County	State	Start Coord.	Time (UTC)	Path length	Max width	Summary
EF0	Elkton	St. Johns	FL	29.79°N 81.43°W	0114 – 0116	0.91 mi (1.46 km)	200 yd (0.18 km)	A barn was severely damaged at a produce farm, and another was completely destroyed. A large tree fell on a mobile home, splitting the unit in two, and several other trees fell onto a boat.

=== May 6 event ===
List of confirmed tornadoes – Monday, May 6, 2013
EF#	Location	County	State	Start Coord.	Time (UTC)	Path length	Max width	Summary
EF0	Western Bakersfield	Kern	CA	35.3773°N 119.0456°W	0210 – 0212	0.44 mi (0.71 km)	15 yd (14 m)	A brief, very weak landspout tornado caused no damage.

=== May 7 event ===
List of confirmed tornadoes – Tuesday, May 7, 2013
EF#	Location	County / Parish	State	Start Coord.	Time (UTC)	Path length	Max width	Summary
EF0	SE of Monteview	Jefferson	ID	43.8993°N 112.4874°W	2210 – 2220	1.17 mi (1.88 km)	5 yd (4.6 m)	A weak tornado caused no damage.

=== May 8 event ===
List of confirmed tornadoes – Wednesday, May 8, 2013
EF#	Location	County / Parish	State	Start Coord.	Time (UTC)	Path length	Max width	Summary
EF0	E of Lamar	Prowers	CO	38.10°N 102.43°W	1954 – 1959	0.1 mi (0.16 km)	75 yd (69 m)	A landspout tornado lasted for about five minutes but caused no damage.
EF0	NW of Mayfield	Yankton	SD	43.10°N 97.35°W	2200 – 2203	0.5 mi (0.80 km)	25 yd (23 m)	A brief landspout tornado was caught on camera but caused no damage.
EF0	NW of Aspermont	Stonewall	TX	33.35°N 100.48°W	2255	0.01 mi (0.016 km)	40 yd (37 m)	A very brief tornado was reported by a storm chaser but caused no damage.
EF0	NE of Jerome	Jerome	ID	42.8019°N 114.4085°W	2320 – 2325	1 mi (1.6 km)	20 yd (18 m)	A brief tornado caused no damage.
EF0	NNE of Catherine (1st tornado)	Ellis	KS	38.97°N 99.20°W	2330 – 2335	0.66 mi (1.06 km)	100 yd (91 m)	This tornado occurred simultaneously with the following tornado, causing no damage.
EF0	NNE of Catherine (2nd tornado)	Ellis	KS	38.9745°N 99.1969°W	2330 – 2332	0.21 mi (0.34 km)	50 yd (46 m)	This tornado occurred simultaneously with the previous tornado, causing no damage.
EF0	N of Gorham	Russell	KS	39.00°N 99.02°W	2339 – 2342	0.41 mi (0.66 km)	50 yd (46 m)	A nearly stationary rope tornado touched down after the merger of two funnels that produced the previous two tornadoes. No damage was reported.
EF0	SE of Minco	Grady	OK	35.2691°N 97.8899°W	0118	0.1 mi (0.16 km)	50 yd (46 m)	A brief tornado was reported by a storm chaser and seen live KWTV. No damage was reported.

=== May 9 event ===
List of confirmed tornadoes – Thursday, May 9, 2013
EF#	Location	County / Parish	State	Start Coord.	Time (UTC)	Path length	Max width	Summary
EF0	S of Stoughton	Norfolk	MA	42.0981°N 71.0962°W	2031 – 2033	0.38 mi (0.61 km)	50 yd (46 m)	A brief tornado touched down near a car dealership and was caught on camera. Three RVs, weighing about 5,000 pounds (2,300 kg) each, were pushed back about 6 feet (1.8 m) into a chain-link fence. A trailer was lifted about 15 feet (4.6 m) and thrown into a light pole, but it landed back on its wheels with minimal damage. A 15 by 20 feet (4.6 by 6.1 m) aluminum door was blown out of a garage at the dealership and ceiling tiles were lifted from the dealership. Two pine trees were downed before the tornado dissipated. This tornado formed from a cold-air funnel, the majority of which do not touch down.
EF0	Snyder	Kiowa	OK	34.66°N 98.95°W	2200	0.1 mi (0.16 km)	10 yd (9.1 m)	A brief, weak landspout tornado caused minor damage to a carport.
EF0	NE of Lostine	Wallowa	OR	45.5209°N 117.3716°W	2230 – 2235	0.1 mi (0.16 km)	10 yd (9.1 m)	A brief tornado caused no damage.
EF0	N of Owaneco	Christian	IL	39.5158°N 89.1932°W	2241 – 2242	0.55 mi (0.89 km)	20 yd (18 m)	No damage was reported.
EF0	SW of Altus	Jackson	OK	34.5197°N 99.3905°W	2321	0.1 mi (0.16 km)	20 yd (18 m)	A brief landspout tornado caused no damage.
EF0	S of Terre Haute	Vigo	IN	39.3759°N 87.4145°W	0014 – 0015	0.14 mi (0.23 km)	20 yd (18 m)	A brief tornado that was observed by a storm spotter downed several trees.
EF0	SE of Terre Haute	Vigo	IN	39.388°N 87.3101°W	0024 – 0025	0.15 mi (0.24 km)	20 yd (18 m)	A tornado was observed by the Riley Fire Department west of Riley. It destroyed a small storage shed and downed several trees.
EF0	NW of Singer	Beauregard	LA	30.6825°N 93.4706°W	0435 – 0438	1.04 mi (1.67 km)	20 yd (18 m)	Numerous pine trees were downed, several of which fell on power lines.

=== May 10 event ===
List of confirmed tornadoes – Friday, May 10, 2013
EF#	Location	County / Parish	State	Start Coord.	Time (UTC)	Path length	Max width	Summary
EF0	Sweet Lake	Cameron	LA	30.0176°N 93.1707°W	0645 – 0646	0.89 mi (1.43 km)	75 yd (69 m)	Several trees were downed and a few homes suffered minor roof damage.

=== May 15 event ===
List of confirmed tornadoes – Wednesday, May 15, 2013
EF#	Location	County / Parish	State	Start Coord.	Time (UTC)	Path length	Max width	Summary
EF0	WNW of Belcherville	Montague	TX	33.814°N 97.881°W	2233 – 2236	1.11 mi (1.79 km)	70 yd (64 m)	A brief tornado caused damage to a ranch.
EF0	SW of Priddy	Mills	TX	31.655°N 98.58°W	2314 – 2318	3.42 mi (5.50 km)	50 yd (46 m)	This tornado remained over open fields and downed several trees.
EF0	WNW of Ada	Pontotoc	OK	34.7805°N 96.7083°W	2334 – 2335	0.5 mi (0.80 km)	50 yd (46 m)	A mobile home was damaged and several trees were downed.
EF0	SSE of Mineral Wells	Palo Pinto	TX	32.771°N 98.072°W	2341 – 2342	0.3 mi (0.48 km)	50 yd (46 m)	A brief tornado caused no damage.
EF1	NE of Nocona	Montague	TX	33.845°N 97.683°W	2350 – 2355	1.01 mi (1.63 km)	200 yd (180 m)	A mobile home slid off of its foundation, a few site-built homes were damaged, and several trees were downed near Lake Nocona.
EF1	WSW of Sunset	Montague	TX	33.434°N 97.89°W	2351 – 2358	3.63 mi (5.84 km)	240 yd (220 m)	Five homes were damaged, one of which was destroyed, a golf course clubhouse was destroyed, and many trees were downed south of Lake Amon G. Carter. One person was injured.
EF1	Southern Millsap	Parker	TX	32.747°N 98.0302°W	0003 – 0019	1.95 mi (3.14 km)	400 yd (370 m)	Several homes and barns were damaged and power lines were downed.
EF0	WSW of Illinois Bend	Montague	TX	33.841°N 97.589°W	0018 – 0020	0.94 mi (1.51 km)	150 yd (140 m)	A brief tornado damaged a home and downed several trees northwest of St. Jo.
EF0	E of Millsap	Parker	TX	32.72°N 97.942°W	0022 – 0025	0.49 mi (0.79 km)	70 yd (64 m)	A brief tornado north of Brock remained over open fields and caused no damage.
EF0	NNW of Bridgeport	Wise	TX	33.408°N 97.6719°W	0035 – 0037	0.69 mi (1.11 km)	25 yd (23 m)	A brief tornado north of Alvord stayed mostly over open land and only downed a few trees.
EF0	E of Dennis	Parker	TX	32.639°N 97.806°W	0053 – 0056	1.46 mi (2.35 km)	200 yd (180 m)	Numerous barns and mobile homes were damaged or destroyed and numerous trees were downed south of Weatherford and southwest of Annetta.
EF4	Southeastern Granbury	Hood	TX	32.412°N 97.754°W	0058 – 0111	2.5 mi (4.0 km)	400 yd (370 m)	6 deaths – See article on this tornado – This large, slow-moving, violent tornado touched down on the west bank of the Brazos River, crossing the river and moving eastward, before downing several trees and power lines and hitting the American Legion hall. The tornado then abruptly turned northward and entered the Rancho Brazos subdivision, reaching peak intensity. Here, 97 of the 110 homes were damaged. While the vast majority of the subdivision sustained EF1 or EF2 damage, 10 homes sustained EF3 damage, and 4 homes sustained EF4 damage. All 6 deaths were in mobile homes. The tornado then continued north for one mile before dissipating. In addition to the fatalities, 54 people were injured.
EF0	SSW of Aledo	Parker	TX	32.566°N 97.675°W	0105 – 0107	0.12 mi (0.19 km)	25 yd (23 m)	A brief tornado caused no known damage.
EF1	Pecan Plantation	Hood, Johnson	TX	32.356°N 97.633°W	0109 – 0121	2.44 mi (3.93 km)	300 yd (270 m)	This tornado produced mostly minor damage in the Pecan Plantation community before crossing the Brazos River and dissipating.
EF0	NW of Cresson	Johnson	TX	32.555°N 97.664°W	0119 – 0122	0.19 mi (0.31 km)	30 yd (27 m)	A brief tornado damaged a billboard and a few farm buildings.
EF0	NNE of Evant (1st tornado)	Hamilton	TX	31.512°N 98.135°W	0134 – 0136	0.21 mi (0.34 km)	30 yd (27 m)	This was the first of two brief tornadoes that occurred simultaneously, although no damage was reported.
EF0	NNE of Evant (2nd tornado)	Hamilton	TX	31.502°N 98.145°W	0135 – 0137	1.04 mi (1.67 km)	40 yd (37 m)	This was the second of two brief tornadoes that occurred simultaneously, although no damage was reported.
EF3	SSW of Cleburne	Johnson	TX	32.255°N 97.495°W	0212 – 0223	7.79 mi (12.54 km)	1,733 yd (1,585 m)	See section on this tornado – Seven people were injured.
EF0	ESE of Cleburne	Johnson	TX	32.311°N 97.297°W	0245 – 0249	1.28 mi (2.06 km)	400 yd (370 m)	Five manufactured homes suffered roof damage and several trees were downed.

=== May 16 event ===
List of confirmed tornadoes – Thursday, May 16, 2013
EF#	Location	County / Parish	State	Start Coord.	Time (UTC)	Path length	Max width	Summary
EF1	Ennis	Ellis	TX	32.325°N 96.631°W	0505 – 0512	6.17 mi (9.93 km)	400 yd (370 m)	A total of 17 homes were damaged, with 4 being destroyed. Another 55 commercial properties were damaged, with 20 suffering severe damage. One person was injured.
EF1	W of Waskom	Harrison	TX	32.4911°N 94.1534°W	1920 – 1924	1.43 mi (2.30 km)	500 yd (460 m)	Several metal buildings were damaged and trees were downed. One person was injured.
EF1	SSE of Waskom	Harrison	TX	32.4636°N 94.0565°W	1934 – 1936	0.42 mi (0.68 km)	200 yd (180 m)	A tornado caused minor damage to metal buildings, construction equipment, and a few houses. Several trees were downed as well.
EF1	ESE of Greenwood	Caddo	LA	32.4468°N 93.9625°W	1939 – 1950	5.23 mi (8.42 km)	1,400 yd (1,300 m)	Many trees were downed, several of which caused damage to mobile homes and site-built homes. One person was injured.
EF1	NNE of Stonewall	Caddo, DeSoto	LA	32.3345°N 93.8128°W	2005 – 2009	2.48 mi (3.99 km)	350 yd (320 m)	A brief tornado near a broad area of straight-line winds downed several trees.

=== May 17 event ===
List of confirmed tornadoes – Friday, May 17, 2013
EF#	Location	County / Parish	State	Start Coord.	Time (UTC)	Path length	Max width	Summary
EF0	S of Athens	Limestone	AL	34.76°N 86.9748°W	1900 – 1907	2.04 mi (3.28 km)	50 yd (46 m)	An intermittent tornado downed trees and shifted wooden front porch pillars at a house. It then skipped northeast, where it ripped metal signs and siding off of a metal pole before dissipating.
EF0	SW of Ardmore	Limestone	AL	34.9546°N 86.8794°W	1945 – 1946	0.15 mi (0.24 km)	50 yd (46 m)	A very brief tornado caused roof damage to several houses and a barn. One brick house sustained structural damage to its bricks and foundation and several trees were downed.
EF0	N of Crawford	Dawes	NE	42.7813°N 103.4°W	2154 – 2200	2.67 mi (4.30 km)	50 yd (46 m)	No damage was reported.
EF0	WSW of Windom	Cottonwood	MN	43.83°N 95.215°W	2245 – 2247	0.5 mi (0.80 km)	50 yd (46 m)	A brief tornado caused no damage.
EF0	S of Miloma	Jackson	MN	43.72°N 95.175°W	2310 – 2312	0.5 mi (0.80 km)	50 yd (46 m)	A brief tornado caused no damage.
EF0	NW of Eliasville (1st tornado)	Young	TX	32.99°N 98.81°W	0034 – 0037	1.02 mi (1.64 km)	75 yd (69 m)	A tornado occurred over open fields and caused no damage.
EF1	NW of Eliasville (2nd tornado)	Young	TX	32.999°N 98.784°W	0050 – 0053	3.14 mi (5.05 km)	20 yd (18 m)	A house suffered significant damage to its roof and back porch.

=== May 18 event ===
List of confirmed tornadoes – Saturday, May 18, 2013
EF#	Location	County / Parish	State	Start Coord.	Time (UTC)	Path length	Max width	Summary
EF0	WSW of Cedar Bluff Reservoir	Trego	KS	38.7602°N 99.8556°W	2227 – 2236	2.92 mi (4.70 km)	100 yd (91 m)	A tornado tracked over open fields and caused no damage.
EF0	N of Broadwater	Morrill	NE	41.7303°N 102.85°W	2258 – 2301	1 mi (1.6 km)	50 yd (46 m)	A brief tornado caused no damage.
EF0	NNW of Brownell	Ness	KS	38.6771°N 99.7453°W	2303 – 2305	0.31 mi (0.50 km)	100 yd (91 m)	A brief multiple-vortex tornado caused no damage.
EF1	SSW of Ellis	Ellis	KS	38.8509°N 99.5849°W	2309 – 2312	1.71 mi (2.75 km)	50 yd (46 m)	Several trees and power poles were damaged.
EF0	NW of Antonino	Ellis	KS	38.8259°N 99.4319°W	2337 – 2339	0.56 mi (0.90 km)	50 yd (46 m)	A brief tornado caused no damage.
EF4	W of Rozel	Pawnee	KS	38.1429°N 99.4706°W	0018 – 0047	7 mi (11 km)	1,100 yd (1,000 m)	Five farm houses were damaged by this large, cone-shaped tornado, one of which had most of its roof and some of its exterior walls destroyed at the house (the other four sustained minor damage). An outbuilding was destroyed, another outbuilding suffered minor damage, and a large 1,000 US gallons (3,800 L) propane tank was ripped off of its concrete foundation and tossed 0.25 mi (400 m). Many trees and power lines were downed, seven irrigation pivots were flipped, and part of a road was scoured as well. The EF4 rating was confirmed based on Doppler on Wheels surface wind observations of 165 to 185 mph (266 to 298 km/h).
EF1	ENE of Sanford	Pawnee	KS	38.2011°N 99.2768°W	0049 – 0101	4 mi (6.4 km)	100 yd (91 m)	This tornado developed to east of the previous event and damaged trees and power poles.
EF0	SSE of Ash Valley	Pawnee	KS	38.242°N 99.1818°W	0110 – 0113	2.06 mi (3.32 km)	100 yd (91 m)	This was the third tornado associated with the supercell that spawned the EF4 Rozel storm; no damage occurred.
EF1	NW of Clay Center	Clay, Washington	KS	39.486°N 97.278°W	0335 – 0345	6.99 mi (11.25 km)	75 yd (69 m)	Irrigation pivots were overturned, trees were downed, and outbuildings were destroyed.
EF0	Southern Washington	Washington	KS	39.811°N 97.056°W	0400 – 0402	0.34 mi (0.55 km)	50 yd (46 m)	Several trees were downed and large tree limbs were torn. A barn also lost its roof.

=== May 19 event ===
List of confirmed tornadoes – Sunday, May 19, 2013
EF#	Location	County / Parish	State	Start Coord.	Time (UTC)	Path length	Max width	Summary
EF0	SW of Viola	Sumner	KS	37.4504°N 97.6697°W	2010–2012	0.57 mi (0.92 km)	50 yd (46 m)	A brief tornado remained over open country, causing no damage.
EF0	E of Viola	Sedgwick	KS	37.4937°N 97.5864°W	2019–2024	0.8 mi (1.3 km)	50 yd (46 m)	A brief rope tornado moved over open country, causing no damage.
EF2	NNE of Clearwater	Sedgwick	KS	37.5797°N 97.5061°W	2037 – 2048	4.61 mi (7.42 km)	300 yd (270 m)	A silo was destroyed, a trailer was blown into outbuildings, and a brick home suffered roof damage. A 3,500 pounds (1,600 kg) horse trailer was rolled 220 yd (200 m), another trailer was rolled 50 to 75 yd (46 to 69 m), and two irrigation pivots were flipped over. A plank of wood was thrown through a car window and an outbuilding was moved off of its foundation. Several trees and power poles were downed as well. The Doppler on Wheels recorded peak winds of 155 miles per hour (249 km/h) at 230 feet (70 m) above ground level.
EF0	SW of Wellington	Sumner	KS	37.14°N 97.49°W	2112–2113	0.42 mi (0.68 km)	50 yd (46 m)	A trained spotter observed a brief tornado in an open field; no damage was reported.
EF1	Edmond	Oklahoma	OK	35.624°N 97.481°W	2122 – 2130	4.5 mi (7.2 km)	900 yd (820 m)	Twelve homes in the town were damaged, including three that sustained major damage. Nine transmission towers were also destroyed by the tornado and it was estimated that it would take a month to replace them.
EF1	SW of Arcadia	Oklahoma	OK	35.6534°N 97.3621°W	2133 - 2134	0.54 mi (0.87 km)	200 yd (180 m)	A power pole was damaged.
EF0	WSW of South Haven	Sumner	KS	37.05°N 97.40°W	2139–2141	0.47 mi (0.76 km)	50 yd (46 m)	A brief tornado was reported by a trained spotter; no damage occurred.
EF0	S of South Haven	Sumner	KS	37.0333°N 97.4151°W	2140–2141	0.4 mi (0.64 km)	50 yd (46 m)	A rope tornado was reported; no damage occurred.
EF3	NW of Luther to SE of Tryon	Oklahoma, Logan, Lincoln	OK	35.693°N 97.232°W	2141 – 2224	20.84 mi (33.54 km)	1,200 yd (1,100 m)	This large multiple-vortex wedge tornado destroyed an outbuilding and two mobile homes shortly after touching down. Along I-35, a hospital that was under-construction had windows blown out and its roof damaged. The tornado clipped the southeastern edge of Carney, damaging or destroying 40 homes and a few industrial buildings there. Power and water supply was knocked out to the town as well. Debris from Carney was reported to have fallen up to 55 mi (89 km) away in Hallett. Video of this tornado revealed extremely violent motions within the funnel, indicating that the tornado may have been stronger than EF3 intensity, but there were no damage indicators to confirm this. Four people were injured.
EF1	SE of Udall	Cowley	KS	37.3404°N 97.1549°W	2146 – 2148	0.71 mi (1.14 km)	50 yd (46 m)	A tornado that was reported by a spotter caused minor damage to a farmstead.
EF1	NE of Wolbach	Greeley	NE	41.439°N 98.365°W	2151 – 2153	0.23 mi (0.37 km)	25 yd (23 m)	A short-lived tornado destroyed a mobile home and shed. Several trees were downed as well.
EF1	E of Udall	Cowley	KS	37.3705°N 97.0941°W	2155 – 2159	1.84 mi (2.96 km)	60 yd (55 m)	Minor damage occurred at a farmstead.
EF0	SW of Ramona	Marion	KS	38.59°N 97.08°W	2205–2207	0.46 mi (0.74 km)	50 yd (46 m)	Law enforcement observed a brief tornado; no damage was reported.
EF0	N of Ramona	Dickinson	KS	38.59°N 97.08°W	2217	0.1 mi (0.16 km)	25 yd (23 m)	The Ramona volunteer police department reported a brief tornado touchdown; no damaged occurred.
EF1	SE of Emporia	Lyon	KS	38.3232°N 96.207°W	2227 – 2237	9 mi (14 km)	75 yd (69 m)	A home and an outbuilding were damaged just west of the Emporia Municipal Airport shortly after the tornado touched down. Sporadic tree damage occurred along the rest of the path.
EF0	N of Arkansas City	Cowley	KS	37.0944°N 97.056°W	2259–2300	0.19 mi (0.31 km)	50 yd (46 m)	A brief tornado moved over open country with no damage being reported.
EF4	E of Norman to ESE of McLoud	Cleveland, Pottawatomie	OK	35.2531°N 97.3001°W	2300 – 2350	23 mi (37 km)	1,500 yd (1,400 m)	2 deaths – See section on this tornado – Ten people were injured.
EF0	Southwestern Adel	Dallas	IA	41.5878°N 94.0668°W	2332 – 2335	2.08 mi (3.35 km)	100 yd (91 m)	A weak tornado, which formed within a very broad circulation, produced a short, intermittent path before dissipating prior to reaching populated areas of Adel.
EF0	N of Bethel Acres	Pottawatomie	OK	35.3365°N 97.0228°W	2340 - 2343	2 mi (3.2 km)	30 yd (27 m)	RaXPol mobile radar data confirmed that an anticyclonic tornado, which was a satellite to the long-tracked Lake Thunderbird–Shawnee EF4 tornado, damaged trees.
EF1	ESE of Dallas Center	Dallas	IA	41.6656°N 93.9073°W	2345 – 2348	1.43 mi (2.30 km)	100 yd (91 m)	A house suffered significant structural damage and numerous trees were downed.
EF0	WNW of Shamrock	Creek	OK	35.9323°N 96.6143°W	2347 - 2348	0.2 mi (0.32 km)	50 yd (46 m)	A brief tornado caused no damage.
EF2	W of Prague	Pottawatomie, Lincoln	OK	35.458°N 96.795°W	2359 – 0012	7.25 mi (11.67 km)	450 yd (410 m)	A house was pushed off of its cinder block foundation and numerous sheds/outbuildings were either damaged or destroyed. Two more houses lost much of their roofs and exterior walls and a fourth house suffered roof, wall, and window damage. A fifth house sustained minor roof damage, an RV was rolled, and many trees were downed.
EF1	SSE of Slater to SSE of Huxley	Polk, Story	IA	41.8463°N 93.6687°W	0007 – 0012	4.71 mi (7.58 km)	150 yd (140 m)	An intermittent tornado removed a garage and part of the roof from a manufactured home.
EF1	NNE of Prague to NW of Welty	Lincoln, Okfuskee, Creek	OK	35.5323°N 96.6538°W	0017 – 0040	14.42 mi (23.21 km)	700 yd (640 m)	Barns and outbuildings were damaged and numerous trees were downed.
EF0	E of Argo Fay	Carroll	IL	42.00°N 89.99°W	0102	0.1 mi (0.16 km)	50 yd (46 m)	Emergency management reported a brief tornado; no damage was reported.

=== May 20 event ===
List of confirmed tornadoes – Monday, May 20, 2013
EF#	Location	County / Parish	State	Start Coord.	Time (UTC)	Path length	Max width	Summary
EF1	E of Carthage	Jasper	MO	37.1672°N 94.2801°W	0506 – 0508	0.5 mi (0.80 km)	100 yd (91 m)	A brief tornado downed numerous trees and power lines. Outbuildings were destroyed as well.
EF1	WNW of Lockwood	Dade	MO	37.3881°N 93.9668°W	0523 – 0524	0.65 mi (1.05 km)	100 yd (91 m)	A grocery store suffered roof damage, a carport was thrown, and several trees were uprooted.
EF5	NW of Newcastle to E of Moore	McClain, Cleveland	OK	35.284°N 97.628°W	1956 – 2035	13.85 mi (22.29 km)	1,900 yd (1,700 m)	24 deaths – See article on this tornado – 212 people were injured and there was one additional death due to natural causes that was indirectly related to the tornado. The tornado took a path similar to the May 3, 1999 Bridge Creek – Moore F5 tornado.
EF0	SSE of Marlow	Stephens	OK	34.5564°N 97.9129°W	1958 – 2001	1 mi (1.6 km)	30 yd (27 m)	Storm chasers reported a brief tornado; no known damage occurred.
EF1	Southern Marlow to W of Hope	Stephens	OK	34.5965°N 97.9331°W	2007 – 2022	4 mi (6.4 km)	200 yd (180 m)	A tornado was observed by several storm chasers and spotters. Trees and power lines suffered minor damage.
EF1	SSW of Avant to WNW of Vera	Osage, Washington	OK	36.4185°N 96.0778°W	2051 – 2105	6.5 mi (10.5 km)	500 yd (460 m)	A high-end EF1 tornado downed numerous trees, one of which fell onto the roof of a home.
EF0	SW of Dearing	Montgomery	KS	37.03°N 95.74°W	2112–2114	0.54 mi (0.87 km)	50 yd (46 m)	A brief tornado remained over open country and caused no damage.
EF1	ESE of Ramona	Washington	OK	36.4923°N 95.8971°W	2121 – 2130	4.5 mi (7.2 km)	400 yd (370 m)	A couple of homes were damaged and several trees were downed.
EF1	ENE of Ramona to NNW of Talala	Washington, Rogers	OK	36.5504°N 95.8223°W	2133 – 2147	6 mi (9.7 km)	500 yd (460 m)	The tornado remained mostly over open country, but one home had roof damage, windows blown out, and a chimney that was ripped from the roof. A nearby metal-frame barn had large doors blown out on both sides as well.
EF0	N of Lake Brownwood	Brown	TX	31.86°N 99.01°W	2135 – 2149	1.17 mi (1.88 km)	50 yd (46 m)	A weak tornado caused no damage.
EF0	NE of Meeker	Lincoln	OK	35.5614°N 96.8146°W	2140 – 2142	1.21 mi (1.95 km)	100 yd (91 m)	A brief tornado was reported; no damage was reported.
EF0	SW of Manter	Stanton	KS	37.4688°N 101.9445°W	2150–2200	0.37 mi (0.60 km)	50 yd (46 m)	A slow-moving landspout tornado caused no damage.
EF0	NE of Monte Vista	Alamosa	CO	37.68°N 106.01°W	2253–2258	0.1 mi (0.16 km)	75 yd (69 m)	A slow-moving landspout tornado remained in an open field; no damage was reported.
EF1	E of Knob Noster to N of Hughesville	Pettis	MO	38.7079°N 93.3886°W	2157 – 2216	14.5 mi (23.3 km)	200 yd (180 m)	This tornado touched down near Knob Noster downing trees, causing roof damage to one house, and causing wall, garage door, window, and roof damage to another house. The tornado moved northeast, downing several trees before reaching a farm, where several structures sustained roof damage and one lost its metal roof and siding. More trees were downed, and two farm equipment sheds were destroyed northeast of the farm. At another farm, parts of the roofs were removed from two buildings. The tornado continued northeast from the second farm and downed a few more trees before dissipating.
EF0	S of Manter	Stanton	KS	37.5055°N 101.88°W	2205–2210	0.27 mi (0.43 km)	50 yd (46 m)	A second landspout tornado formed after the previous one in Stanton County dissipated; no damage was reported.
EF0	S of Stockton	Cedar	MO	37.654°N 93.8301°W	2237 – 2240	3.2 mi (5.1 km)	100 yd (91 m)	A high-end EF0 tornado damaged a barn and several trees.
EF1	Blanket	Brown	TX	31.83°N 98.79°W	2241 – 2255	3.65 mi (5.87 km)	350 yd (320 m)	This tornado moved through Blanket and dissipated south-southeast of town. Two heavy air-conditioning units at Blanket High School were blown off of the roof. It caused roof damage to the gymnasium at the school as well as the nearby bus barn. Trees, power lines, steel fencing, and to tombstones at a cemetery were all knocked down. Some of the trees were oak trees that were more than 100 years old.
EF0	S of Ringgold	Montague	TX	33.798°N 97.931°W	2241–2244	0.92 mi (1.48 km)	50 yd (46 m)	A brief tornado was observed by trained spotters just south of Ringgold. It remained over open land, causing minimal damage.
EF0	NNE of Zephyr	Brown	TX	31.73°N 98.78°W	2300 – 2303	0.2 mi (0.32 km)	50 yd (46 m)	A brief tornado caused no damage.
EF1	NW of Lamar	Barton	MO	37.5204°N 94.4237°W	2303 – 2305	6.81 mi (10.96 km)	100 yd (91 m)	Trees were downed and outbuildings were damaged.
EF2	N of Fairland to NE of Wyandotte	Ottawa	OK	36.8129°N 94.8461°W	2325 – 2340	10 mi (16 km)	800 yd (730 m)	Several homes were damaged, a metal building was severely damaged, and many trees were downed. The tornado occurred simultaneously with the one below.
EF1	NW of Wyandotte, OK to SE of Seneca, MO	Ottawa (OK), Newton (MO)	OK, MO	36.8128°N 94.7701°W	2332 – 2343	9.31 mi (14.98 km)	600 yd (550 m)	This high-end EF1 tornado developed as a twin to the above tornado. Several houses, barns, and outbuildings were damaged. Several trees were downed as well.
EF1	ESE of Proctor	Adair	OK	35.9476°N 94.7581°W	2332 – 2334	2 mi (3.2 km)	150 yd (140 m)	Several trees were downed.
EF1	W of Christie	Adair	OK	35.939°N 94.7271°W	2335 – 2337	2.5 mi (4.0 km)	300 yd (270 m)	Trees were downed and a barn was damaged.
EF1	WSW of Christie, OK to N of Cincinnati, AR	Adair (OK), Washington (AR)	OK, AR	35.9817°N 94.614°W	2340 – 2347	8 mi (13 km)	500 yd (460 m)	Two barns were destroyed, a third barn was damaged, and numerous trees were downed.
EF1	N of Siloam Springs	Benton	AR	36.2001°N 94.5690°W	2349 – 2354	2.9 mi (4.7 km)	500 yd (460 m)	Several homes suffered minor damage and many trees were downed.
EF1	Lehigh	Coal	OK	34.4479°N 96.2849°W	2349 – 2357	5.9 mi (9.5 km)	250 yd (230 m)	Trees and outbuildings were damaged.
EF0	NNW of Collins	St. Clair	MO	37.9375°N 93.636°W	2356 – 2357	0.48 mi (0.77 km)	200 yd (180 m)	A brief tornado downed several trees.
EF1	SE of Prairie Creek	Benton	AR	36.3200°N 93.9296°W	0024 – 0025	0.8 mi (1.3 km)	270 yd (250 m)	A brief tornado embedded in a larger area of straight-line winds in the Beaver Lake area damaged one home and several boat docks. Many trees were downed as well.
EF1	WSW of Hannibal	Marion	MO	39.6938°N 91.4486°W	0024 – 0026	1.16 mi (1.87 km)	50 yd (46 m)	A farm building suffered roof damage and many trees were downed.
EF0	ENE of Priddy	Mills	TX	31.677°N 98.485°W	0025–0027	1.08 mi (1.74 km)	100 yd (91 m)	The Mills County Emergency Manager observed a tornado to the east-northeast of Priddy. It remained over open land, causing minimal damage.
EF1	NE of Shell Knob	Barry, Stone	MO	36.6279°N 93.5845°W	0050 – 0052	1.42 mi (2.29 km)	200 yd (180 m)	Several trees were downed.
EF0	N of Reeds Spring (1st tornado)	Stone	MO	36.7895°N 93.3925°W	0105–0106	1.35 mi (2.17 km)	100 yd (91 m)	A brief tornado downed several trees and tree limbs.
EF1	N of Reeds Spring (2nd tornado)	Stone	MO	36.7755°N 93.3772°W	0105 – 0106	0.58 mi (0.93 km)	100 yd (91 m)	Trees were downed along the path.
EF0	SW of Bokoshe	Le Flore	OK	35.1399°N 94.8763°W	0133–0134	0.7 mi (1.1 km)	260 yd (240 m)	Several trees were downed.
EF1	Cameron	Le Flore	OK	35.0737°N 94.5888°W	0144 – 0155	8.5 mi (13.7 km)	500 yd (460 m)	A home sustained minor roof damage and several trees were downed.
EF0	NW of Gravois Mills	Morgan	MO	38.33°N 92.87°W	0146–0147	0.74 mi (1.19 km)	100 yd (91 m)	Brief tornado uprooted trees and caused minor structural damage.
EF2	Mount Olive	Macoupin	IL	39.072°N 89.7264°W	0314 – 0315	0.2 mi (0.32 km)	75 yd (69 m)	A brief, but strong high-end EF2 tornado moved through the downtown portion of Mount Olive. The second story of a brick building was blown off and several homes, including a historic two-story home, and business had windows blown out and significant roof damage, some of which had their roofs completely ripped off. Three people sustained minor injuries.

=== May 21 event ===
List of confirmed tornadoes – Tuesday, May 21, 2013
EF#	Location	County / Parish	State	Start Coord.	Time (UTC)	Path length	Max width	Summary
EF0	E of Roachdale	Putnam	IN	39.8483°N 86.7255°W	0629 – 0631	1.05 mi (1.69 km)	100 yd (91 m)	A brief tornado damaged a barn and a shed, flipped an irrigation system, and downed several trees.
EF0	WNW of North Salem	Hendricks	IN	39.8734°N 86.6666°W	0634 – 0635	0.13 mi (0.21 km)	30 yd (27 m)	A brief tornado caused damage to a home and a barn and downed several trees.

=== May 23 event ===
List of confirmed tornadoes – Thursday, May 23, 2013
EF#	Location	County / Parish	State	Start Coord.	Time (UTC)	Path length	Max width	Summary
EF0	ESE of Lockney	Floyd	TX	34.1°N 101.32°W	1853	0.01 mi (0.016 km)	30 yd (27 m)	Multiple storm chasers observed a brief landspout tornado; no damage was reported.
EF0	E of Lockney	Floyd	TX	34.11°N 101.2°W	1922	0.01 mi (0.016 km)	30 yd (27 m)	The Floydada Fire Department personnel observed a brief landspout tornado; no damage was reported.
EF0	E of Floydada	Floyd	TX	33.9935°N 101.1655°W	1930–1935	0.67 mi (1.08 km)	50 yd (46 m)	Multiple storm chasers observed a landspout tornado. It remained over open country, causing no damage.
EF1	NNE of Girard	Dickens	TX	33.48°N 100.66°W	2115 – 2125	1.94 mi (3.12 km)	300 yd (270 m)	Trees were downed over open country east of Spur.
EF0	Eastern Rotan	Fisher	TX	32.86°N 100.45°W	2312–2318	1 mi (1.6 km)	175 yd (160 m)	Trees were downed and a few structures suffered minor roof damage.

=== May 25 event ===
List of confirmed tornadoes – Saturday, May 25, 2013
EF#	Location	County / Parish	State	Start Coord.	Time (UTC)	Path length	Max width	Summary
EF0	SW of La Vernia	Wilson	TX	29.3427°N 98.1209°W	0845 – 0846	0.3 mi (0.48 km)	50 yd (46 m)	A brief tornado damaged about 12 homes and aluminum carports in the Country Garden and Woodcreek communities of La Vernia.
EF0	WSW of Live Oak	Bexar	TX	29.5498°N 98.3479°W	1025 – 1027	0.4 mi (0.64 km)	100 yd (91 m)	A brief tornado caused minor damage to homes in suburban areas. The facade of a medical building was entirely torn off, while a hospital sustained damage to windows, doors, and rooftop air conditioning units. An aluminum storage shed was picked up and thrown over the top of two houses. Trees and power lines were downed as well.
EF0	NNE of Victoria	Victoria	TX	28.8719°N 96.9825°W	1847 – 1852	1.25 mi (2.01 km)	25 yd (23 m)	A tornado was reported and confirmed by multiple photographs; it remained in an open field and caused no damage.

=== May 26 event ===
List of confirmed tornadoes – Sunday, May 26, 2013
EF#	Location	County / Parish	State	Start Coord.	Time (UTC)	Path length	Max width	Summary
EF0	WNW of Mountain Home	Elmore	ID	43.1854°N 115.8833°W	2010–2015	3.92 mi (6.31 km)	50 yd (46 m)	A brief landspout tornado was confirmed by two Facebook photographs; no damage was reported.
EF0	WSW of Diagonal	Ringgold	IA	40.7901°N 94.3705°W	0023 – 0024	0.12 mi (0.19 km)	30 yd (27 m)	Law enforcement reported a brief tornado; no damage was reported.

=== May 27 event ===
List of confirmed tornadoes – Monday, May 27, 2013
EF#	Location	County / Parish	State	Start Coord.	Time (UTC)	Path length	Max width	Summary
EF0	N of Meeteetse	Park	WY	44.328°N 108.8266°W	1700 – 1718	6.27 mi (10.09 km)	20 yd (18 m)	A weak tornado was reported by Park County Sheriffs Office and was photographed from several vantage points; no damage was reported.
EF0	NW of Kimball	Kimball	NE	41.28°N 103.73°W	2005 – 2015	7.38 mi (11.88 km)	50 yd (46 m)	A weak tornado remained over open country, causing no damage.
EF0	NE of Kimball	Kimball	NE	41.30°N 103.57°W	2125 – 2128	5.43 mi (8.74 km)	50 yd (46 m)	A weak tornado remained over open country, causing no damage.
EF0	N of Arapahoe (1st tornado)	Cheyenne	CO	38.9441°N 102.1663°W	2138 – 2143	0.25 mi (0.40 km)	50 yd (46 m)	A landspout tornado remained nearly stationary over an open field, causing no damage.
EF0	N of Arapahoe (2nd tornado)	Cheyenne	CO	38.9441°N 102.1663°W	2149 – 2157	0.25 mi (0.40 km)	50 yd (46 m)	A second landspout tornado formed after the previous one dissipated and also remained nearly stationary over an open field, causing no damage.
EF0	SE of Harrison	Sioux	NE	42.5265°N 103.6614°W	2158 – 2203	2 mi (3.2 km)	50 yd (46 m)	A weak tornado remained over open country, causing no damage.
EF0	W of Hemingford	Box Butte	NE	42.32°N 103.4223°W	2205 – 2210	0.3 mi (0.48 km)	30 yd (27 m)	A weak tornado remained over open country, causing no damage.
EF0	N of Cheyenne Wells	Cheyenne	CO	38.92°N 102.35°W	2237 – 2243	0.25 mi (0.40 km)	50 yd (46 m)	A landspout tornado was observed on streaming video from a storm chaser; no damage was reported.
EF0	NW of Smith Center	Smith	KS	39.817°N 98.831°W	2332 – 2336	0.38 mi (0.61 km)	15 yd (14 m)	A tornado remained over open land, causing no damage.
EF0	S of Bellaire	Smith	KS	39.812°N 98.684°W	2345–2346	0.01 mi (0.016 km)	10 yd (9.1 m)	A brief tornado remained over open land, causing no damage.
EF3	N of Lebanon to N of Esbon	Smith, Jewell	KS	39.857°N 98.543°W	0004 – 0020	5.74 mi (9.24 km)	1,580 yd (1,440 m)	This slow-moving, large wedge low-end EF3 tornado significantly damaged a home, which had its roof completely removed, inflicted mostly minor damage to several other homes, and destroyed at least one shed. Many trees were downed and vehicles were damaged as well. One person was injured. The second model of the tornado intercept vehicle, designed by Sean Casey, intercepted the tornado. Instruments on the vehicle measured a gust of 175 mph (282 km/h) before the measuring equipment was destroyed, indicating that the tornado possibly reached EF4 intensity.
EF2	Edgar	Clay	NE	40.374°N 98.014°W	0032 – 0040	4.47 mi (7.19 km)	250 yd (230 m)	This strong low-end EF2 tornado touched down west of Edgar before moving directly through the center of the town. Numerous outbuildings, larger metal buildings, and grain silos were either damaged or destroyed. Several homes and businesses in town were damaged, a few of which lost their roofs. Trees and power poles were downed, and irrigation pivots were overturned before the tornado lifted east of Edgar.
EF0	N of Shea	Jefferson	NE	40.14°N 97.0196°W	0151 – 0156	3.28 mi (5.28 km)	100 yd (91 m)	Center pivot irrigation systems were overturned, and trees and farm outbuildings were damaged.
EF2	ESE of Harbine	Jefferson	NE	40.1798°N 96.9171°W	0202 – 0206	5.93 mi (9.54 km)	600 yd (550 m)	This low-end EF2 tornado destroyed five outbuildings, including a large recently well-built metal outbuilding. Four homes suffered minor damage, 2x4 boards were driven into the ground, irrigation pivots were overturned, and power poles were downed.
EF0	N of Beatrice	Gage	NE	40.2151°N 96.7607°W	0216 – 0220	1.36 mi (2.19 km)	100 yd (91 m)	A weak tornado caused minor damage to outbuildings and snapped tree limbs.
EF2	W of Marysville	Marshall	KS	39.834°N 96.737°W	0240 – 0245	3.83 mi (6.16 km)	150 yd (140 m)	A high-end EF2 tornado initially touched down as a weak tornado, overturning a grain bin. It moved generally northeast, severely damaging a John Deere dealership, where exterior walls were collapsed and a nearby metal building was destroyed. It then caused roof damage to a home and a barn, as well as sliding a garage off of its foundation and destroying it. Many trees were downed along the path.

=== May 28 event ===
List of confirmed tornadoes – Tuesday, May 28, 2013
EF#	Location	County / Parish	State	Start Coord.	Time (UTC)	Path length	Max width	Summary
EF0	NNW of Clear Lake	Beaver	OK	36.7996°N 100.33°W	2008 – 2011	0.82 mi (1.32 km)	25 yd (23 m)	A brief landspout tornado remained over grasslands, causing very little damage.
EF0	E of Forgan	Beaver	OK	36.903°N 100.4272°W	2029 – 2040	1.77 mi (2.85 km)	25 yd (23 m)	A landspout tornado formed over undeveloped grassland, causing little damage.
EF3	W of Corning (1st tornado)	Nemaha	KS	39.6676°N 96.1213°W	2116 – 2134	4.4 mi (7.1 km)	900 yd (820 m)	A large, slow-moving intense tornado destroyed a home, nearly flattened an older home, rolled a vehicle, and tossed heavy farm equipment. Several outbuildings were either damaged or destroyed and trees and power poles were downed as well.
EF1	W of Corning (2nd tornado)	Nemaha	KS	39.6528°N 96.0712°W	2120	0.01 mi (0.016 km)	50 yd (46 m)	This brief tornado formed as a satellite to the EF3 Corning event. Moderate damage was reported in association with this tornado.
EF0	W of Porter	Sioux	NE	42.08°N 103.73°W	2123 – 2138	6.31 mi (10.15 km)	75 yd (69 m)	A weak tornado caused no damage.
EF1	NE of Corning	Nemaha	KS	39.6599°N 96.016°W	2145	0.01 mi (0.016 km)	50 yd (46 m)	A brief tornado, which spun-up after the large EF3 tornado dissipated, downed trees and damaged a home.
EF0	NE of Lake Alice	Box Butte	NE	42.13°N 103.42°W	2205 – 2210	2.16 mi (3.48 km)	50 yd (46 m)	An intermittent tornado, which came from the same storm that produced the Sioux County EF0 tornado, caused no damage.
EF0	NNE of Culver	Ottawa	KS	39.0232°N 97.7218°W	2233	0.01 mi (0.016 km)	25 yd (23 m)	A very brief rope tornado caused no damage. The same storm would produce the EF3 Bennington tornado below.
EF3	W of Bennington	Ottawa	KS	39.0376°N 97.709°W	2245 – 2345	2.33 mi (3.75 km)	1,000 yd (910 m)	See section on this tornado – Officially listed as an EF3 tornado based on damage surveys; however, based on data from mobile Doppler radar, meteorologists at the National Weather Service office in Topeka, Kansas strongly believe the tornado was of EF4 intensity.
EF1	SE of Allen	Bennett	SD	43.2702°N 101.9137°W	0013 – 0014	0.1 mi (0.16 km)	20 yd (18 m)	A mobile home was rolled down a hill and a stick-built house had its roof ripped off and several walls knocked down.
EF1	NE of Cranesville	Erie	PA	41.92°N 80.30°W	2335 – 2340	1.69 mi (2.72 km)	50 yd (46 m)	A low-end EF1 tornado overturned and destroyed a mobile home, injuring all five occupants. A couple of farm buildings were heavily damaged, and many trees were downed as well.
EF0	E of Albert	Barton	KS	38.45°N 99.01°W	2337 – 2344	4.18 mi (6.73 km)	50 yd (46 m)	An almost stationary rope tornado formed near the Barton–Rush County line; it remained over open fields and caused no damage.
EF0	S of Otis	Rush	KS	38.5011°N 99.05°W	2340 – 2345	0.62 mi (1.00 km)	75 yd (69 m)	A brief rope tornado caused no damage.
EF0	SW of Bootleg	Deaf Smith	TX	34.7897°N 102.961°W	2345 – 2350	2.14 mi (3.44 km)	75 yd (69 m)	A rope tornado caused no damage.
EF1	N of Edinboro to SE of Union City	Erie	PA	41.90°N 80.13°W	2353 – 0020	17.83 mi (28.69 km)	150 yd (140 m)	An intermittent tornado downed many trees, several of which fell onto houses. Other houses suffered roof and siding damage unrelated to trees. Other damage that was observed along the path was found to have been the result of a downburst. Two people were injured by the tornado.
EF0	NW of Woodhull Township	Shiawassee	MI	42.832°N 84.181°W	0047 – 0049	0.74 mi (1.19 km)	60 yd (55 m)	Trees were uprooted, and shingles were ripped from a church roof.
EF0	Southern Morrice	Shiawassee	MI	42.832°N 84.181°W	0052 – 0053	0.5 mi (0.80 km)	100 yd (91 m)	Many trees were downed over the south part of Morrice.
EF1	N of Flint	Genesee	MI	43.0671°N 83.7173°W	0101 – 0106	2.28 mi (3.67 km)	400 yd (370 m)	Many trees were downed, and several older commercial buildings were damaged.
EF1	SSE of Bancroft to ENE of Gaines	Shiawassee, Genesee	MI	42.83°N 84.029°W	0109 – 0124	9.89 mi (15.92 km)	550 yd (500 m)	Roof and siding were torn off of a home, an old barn was destroyed, and another barn lost all of its roof. Several other structures sustained roof damage and many trees were downed.
EF0	NE of Mazon	Grundy	IL	41.2565°N 88.3852°W	0118 – 0120	1.85 mi (2.98 km)	20 yd (18 m)	Doors were blown off of an outbuilding and trees and power poles were downed.
EF0	Brokenstraw Township	Warren	PA	41.8863°N 79.3588°W	0125 – 0129	2.76 mi (4.44 km)	50 yd (46 m)	A brief tornado embedded within a larger area of damaging straight-line winds downed about 400 trees and destroyed an outbuilding. A church, four houses, and an outbuilding were also damaged.
EF2	NNW of Fenton	Genesee	MI	42.8519°N 83.7734°W	0130 – 0141	5.1 mi (8.2 km)	500 yd (460 m)	Several homes suffered significant damage, including loss of roofs, and many trees were downed.
EF2	SE of Grand Blanc	Genesee	MI	42.896°N 83.574°W	0154 – 0206	4.61 mi (7.42 km)	300 yd (270 m)	A high-end EF2 tornado nearly destroyed a house while a garage and several other buildings were completely destroyed.
EF1	WSW of Scandia	Warren	PA	41.9116°N 79.0867°W	0158 – 0206	4.22 mi (6.79 km)	100 yd (91 m)	An intermittent tornado damaged two homes and downed about 500 trees.
EF0	NW of Walcott	Deaf Smith	TX	34.9936°N 102.921°W	0206 – 0211	2.06 mi (3.32 km)	150 yd (140 m)	A short-lived tornado caused no damage.

=== May 29 event ===
List of confirmed tornadoes – Wednesday, May 29, 2013
EF#	Location	County / Parish	State	Start Coord.	Time (UTC)	Path length	Max width	Summary
EF0	NE of Rangely	Rio Blanco	CO	40.1965°N 108.3272°W	1550 – 1610	1 mi (1.6 km)	40 yd (37 m)	A tornado was photographed by people up to 25 miles (40 km) away. It picked up dirt and vegetable debris but otherwise did not cause damage.
EF0	NNE of Clay Center (1st tornado)	Clay	NE	40.546°N 98.046°W	1956 – 2000	0.49 mi (0.79 km)	25 yd (23 m)	A short-lived tornado caused no damage.
EF0	NE of Quitaque	Briscoe	TX	34.38°N 100.99°W	2030 – 2035	0.68 mi (1.09 km)	50 yd (46 m)	Minor damage was inflicted to a barn.
EF0	S of Russell Springs	Russell	KS	38.83°N 101.18°W	2035 – 2036	0.1 mi (0.16 km)	25 yd (23 m)	Emergency management observed a short-lived landspout tornado; no damage was reported.
EF0	SW of Turkey	Hall	TX	34.3759°N 100.9094°W	2044 – 2046	0.56 mi (0.90 km)	50 yd (46 m)	Members of the Turkey Fire Department observed a landspout tornado; no damage was reported.
EF0	N of Sutton	Clay	NE	40.692°N 97.86°W	2045	0.01 mi (0.016 km)	15 yd (14 m)	A brief tornado caused no damage.
EF0	S of Bradshaw	York	NE	40.855°N 97.75°W	2120	0.01 mi (0.016 km)	15 yd (14 m)	A brief tornado caused no damage.
EF1	NNE of Clay Center (2nd tornado)	Clay	NE	40.554°N 98.038°W	2121 – 2129	4.34 mi (6.98 km)	75 yd (69 m)	Metal panels were ripped from the roof and walls of an outbuilding and a home sustained minor damage.
EF1	NW of York	York	NE	40.913°N 97.636°W	2136 – 2200	8.39 mi (13.50 km)	150 yd (140 m)	Outbuildings, grain bins, and a garage were heavily damaged or destroyed and a few homes also sustained minor damage. Trees were uprooted, power poles were snapped, and irrigation pivots were overturned as well.
EF0	W of Comstock	Custer	NE	41.56°N 99.26°W	2146	0.25 mi (0.40 km)	35 yd (32 m)	A brief tornado caused no damage.
EF1	E of York	York	NE	40.799°N 97.587°W	2148 – 2220	15.93 mi (25.64 km)	400 yd (370 m)	Two outbuildings were damaged or destroyed, irrigation pivots were overturned, and trees and power poles were snapped.
EF1	W of Calumet	Canadian	OK	35.6°N 98.2268°W	2200	0.2 mi (0.32 km)	20 yd (18 m)	A barn was destroyed, and a house was damaged.
EF0	E of Grinnell	Gove	KS	39.1362°N 100.5632°W	2243–2245	1.3 mi (2.1 km)	25 yd (23 m)	A storm chaser observed a small rope tornado; no damage was reported.
EF0	E of Garnavillo, IA to Patch Grove, WI	Clayton (IA), Grant (WI)	IA, WI	42.8682°N 91.2178°W	2246 – 2254	6.38 mi (10.27 km)	10 yd (9.1 m)	A few campers and buildings were damaged and trees were downed.
EF2	SSE of Florida to Schenectady	Montgomery, Schenectady	NY	42.8457°N 74.2034°W	2247 – 2304	12.8 mi (20.6 km)	1,760 yd (1,610 m)	A very large tornado, which was up to a 1 mi (1.6 km) wide, tore the roofs off of several structures, downed a large number of trees, and toppled high-tension power line towers. One person was injured.
EF1	S of Summit	Schoharie	NY	42.5262°N 74.579°W	2257 – 2302	1.57 mi (2.53 km)	200 yd (180 m)	Many trees were downed.
EF0	NE of Rising City	Butler	NE	41.23°N 97.26°W	2300 – 2305	0.64 mi (1.03 km)	25 yd (23 m)	Emergency management reported a tornado that caused no damage.
EF0	WNW of Elba	Howard	NE	41.3161°N 98.7156°W	2305	0.01 mi (0.016 km)	15 yd (14 m)	A brief tornado did not cause damage.
EF0	SW of Bartlett	Wheeler	NE	41.85°N 98.59°W	2308	0.2 mi (0.32 km)	35 yd (32 m)	A brief tornado caused no damage.
EF1	Vischer Ferry	Saratoga	NY	42.7865°N 73.8085°W	2310–2311	0.75 mi (1.21 km)	200 yd (180 m)	The roof was torn off of a shed, windows were blown out of a house, and a barn was shifted off of its foundation. About 100 trees were downed along the path as well.
EF1	Southwestern Norman	Cleveland	OK	35.1907°N 97.4535°W	2342	0.1 mi (0.16 km)	10 yd (9.1 m)	A house was damaged.
EF0	SW of Lakin (1st tornado)	Kearny	KS	37.76°N 101.44°W	2350–2353	0.28 mi (0.45 km)	75 yd (69 m)	A trained storm spotter observed a tornado lifting dirt but causing no damage.
EF0	SW of Lakin (2nd tornado)	Kearny	KS	37.77°N 101.47°W	0000–0012	0.3 mi (0.48 km)	100 yd (91 m)	Members of the public observed a tornado; no damage was reported.
EF0	SSW of Lakin	Kearny	KS	37.7666°N 101.387°W	0020–0023	0.12 mi (0.19 km)	75 yd (69 m)	A National Weather Service employee observed a tornado lifting dirt but causing no damage.
EF0	S of Erick	Beckham	OK	35.033°N 99.884°W	0021–0023	0.75 mi (1.21 km)	150 yd (140 m)	A storm chaser observed a dust-filled tornado that caused no known damage.
EF1	Southeastern Prairie View	Phillips	KS	39.818°N 99.578°W	0110 – 0112	0.78 mi (1.26 km)	40 yd (37 m)	A low-end EF1 tornado embedded within a larger area of damaging straight-line winds struck a farmstead, damaging or destroying three outbuildings, snapping tree limbs, and inflicting window damage to a home.

=== May 30 event ===
List of confirmed tornadoes – Thursday, May 30, 2013
EF#	Location	County / Parish	State	Start Coord.	Time (UTC)	Path length	Max width	Summary
EF1	N of Rocky	Polk	AR	34.6241°N 94.3696°W	1908 – 1909	0.8 mi (1.3 km)	200 yd (180 m)	A shed was destroyed, a metal barn lost its roof, and the roof of a house was damaged. Many large trees were downed as well.
EF2	Oden	Montgomery	AR	34.6017°N 93.8294°W	2000 – 2007	3.37 mi (5.42 km)	400 yd (370 m)	A house had its roof removed, while another house was damaged. Several outbuildings were either damaged or destroyed and numerous trees were downed. Two people were injured.
EF1	SE of Kirby	Pike	AR	34.212°N 93.568°W	2003 – 2007	1.48 mi (2.38 km)	300 yd (270 m)	Trees were downed, and deer stands were knocked over.
EF0	Perkins	Payne	OK	35.9619°N 97.0395°W	2008–2009	0.26 mi (0.42 km)	100 yd (91 m)	A short-lived tornado that was reported via KWTV lasted about 30 seconds, causing no damage.
EF0	E of Perkins	Payne	OK	35.98°N 96.94°W	2015 – 2016	0.71 mi (1.14 km)	100 yd (91 m)	A tornado was reported via KWTV; no damage occurred.
EF2	E of Rosboro to NW of Bonnerdale	Pike, Clark, Montgomery, Hot Spring	AR	34.2834°N 93.4865°W	2016 – 2035	9 mi (14 km)	300 yd (270 m)	A mobile home was destroyed, a large metal barn was badly damaged, and a house suffered roof damage. Numerous trees and power poles were downed as well. Three people were injured north of Amity.
EF0	Ripley	Payne	OK	36.0145°N 96.8835°W	2026 – 2030	1.64 mi (2.64 km)	200 yd (180 m)	A tornado developed under a large revolving bowl wall cloud. Although debris was noted; no damage was reported.
EF1	NW of Mountain Pine	Garland	AR	34.6020°N 93.2640°W	2035 – 2051	8.7 mi (14.0 km)	300 yd (270 m)	This tornado began as a waterspout over Lake Ouachita before moving onshore about 1.5 mi (2.4 km) west of Lena Landing. Numerous trees were downed by the tornado, resulting in damage to a house and several cabins.
EF2	SE of Watson, OK to NE of Cove, AR	McCurtain OK), Polk (AR)	OK, AR	34.3652°N 94.4992°W	2035 – 2055	8.6 mi (13.8 km)	800 yd (730 m)	This tornado downed many trees in McCurtain County before crossing the Oklahoma–Arkansas state line. There, more trees were knocked down, some of which fell on and damaged mobile homes and site-built homes, and a barn was destroyed. Vehicles were damaged and power lines were downed as well.
EF0	NNW of Cushing	Payne	OK	36.0335°N 96.7874°W	2037 – 2038	0.37 mi (0.60 km)	50 yd (46 m)	A trained storm spotter observed a brief tornado; no damage was reported.
EF1	W of Royal	Garland	AR	34.4672°N 93.3209°W	2049 – 2108	7.16 mi (11.52 km)	300 yd (270 m)	This tornado touched down southwest of Royal, destroying a few barns and outbuildings. Several homes sustained roof damage and one had an addition added on room destroyed. A mobile home and two travel trailers were overturned, and another mobile home had one end ripped off. Several trees were downed, one of which crushed a van and another of which fell onto a mobile home. The tornado then lifted north of Royal.
EF0	NNW of Oilton	Creek	OK	36.1268°N 96.604°W	2101	0.1 mi (0.16 km)	50 yd (46 m)	Storm chasers reported a brief tornado over open country; no known damage occurred.
EF1	Conesville	Muscatine	IA	41.3677°N 91.354°W	2110 – 2112	2.43 mi (3.91 km)	100 yd (91 m)	Trees were downed and a mobile home lost part of its roof.
EF1	ESE of Wickes	Polk	AR	34.2776°N 94.3015°W	2132 – 2136	2.43 mi (3.91 km)	200 yd (180 m)	A home suffered roof damage and the metal roof of a shed was torn off. Many trees were downed, a few of which crushed mobile homes, and large trees were downed.
EF1	Andalusia, IL to NE of Buffalo, IA	Rock Island (IL), Scott (IA)	IL, IA	41.4345°N 90.7256°W	2144 – 2147	3.96 mi (6.37 km)	150 yd (140 m)	Large trees were downed, some of which fell onto houses. The tornado crossed the Mississippi River, briefly becoming a waterspout as well.
EF0	SW of Prophetstown	Whiteside	IL	41.657°N 89.9809°W	2235 – 2236	0.57 mi (0.92 km)	25 yd (23 m)	A brief, weak tornado caused no damage.
EF0	NE of Pernell	Garvin	OK	34.565°N 97.501°W	2258–2259	0.41 mi (0.66 km)	200 yd (180 m)	A trained storm spotter observed a brief, rain-wrapped tornado; no damage was reported.
EF1	W of Norman	Montgomery	AR	34.4496°N 93.8027°W	2310 – 2316	3.22 mi (5.18 km)	200 yd (180 m)	Numerous trees were downed and a hay barn was badly damaged.
EF0	WSW of Mazie	Mayes	OK	36.0813°N 95.419°W	2349	0.1 mi (0.16 km)	50 yd (46 m)	A brief tornado caused no damage.
EF0	WSW of Mazie	Mayes	OK	36.0936°N 95.3985°W	2354	0.1 mi (0.16 km)	50 yd (46 m)	A brief tornado caused no damage.
EF0	ENE of Mazie	Mayes	OK	36.1009°N 95.3669°W	0008–0009	0.6 mi (0.97 km)	100 yd (91 m)	A brief tornado caused no damage.
EF1	SE of Murphy	Mayes	OK	36.1233°N 95.2282°W	0024 – 0030	2.1 mi (3.4 km)	200 yd (180 m)	Several trees were downed.
EF1	NW of Paron	Saline	AR	34.7876°N 92.8137°W	0046 – 0050	1.72 mi (2.77 km)	250 yd (230 m)	The roof was torn off of a church with of several houses also sustaining roof damage. A motor home was damaged, several outbuildings were either damaged or destroyed, and many trees were downed.
EF2	SE of Broken Arrow to NE of Oneta	Tulsa, Wagoner	OK	36.0224°N 95.7729°W	0140 – 0154	5.6 mi (9.0 km)	450 yd (410 m)	This tornado destroyed barns, damaged homes, and downed trees before moving into Wagoner County. There, the tornado reached high-end EF2 strength, severely damaging metal buildings, a gas station, and dozens of homes, several of which lost their roofs and another that lost its second story. The tornado continued eastward, damaging more homes and a large brick building, destroying a wood-framed outbuilding, and downing more trees before lifting.
EF1	NNE of Maumelle	Pulaski	AR	34.8896°N 92.3925°W	0213 – 0214	0.16 mi (0.26 km)	150 yd (140 m)	A brief tornado on the north side of a larger area of damaging straight-line winds moved a mobile home off of its foundation, blew in doors and a wall of a metal building, and downed many trees.
EF1	S of Tull	Grant	AR	34.4355°N 92.5823°W	0236 – 0237	0.36 mi (0.58 km)	200 yd (180 m)	1 death – A brief tornado downed many trees, one of which fell on a car, killing the driver. A couple of homes suffered minor roof damage as well.

=== May 31 event ===
List of confirmed tornadoes – Friday, May 31, 2013
EF#	Location	County / Parish	State	Start Coord.	Time (UTC)	Path length	Max width	Summary
EF1	NW of Pamona	Howell	MO	36.8588°N 92.0101°W	0520 – 0525	4.28 mi (6.89 km)	400 yd (370 m)	Hundreds of trees were downed and a machine shed was damaged.
EF1	SW of Brinkley	Monroe	AR	34.8231°N 91.2550°W	0535 – 0536	0.36 mi (0.58 km)	100 yd (91 m)	A brief tornado caused minor roof damage to a building and downed many trees in a cemetery.
EF1	NE of Brinkley	Monroe, St. Francis	AR	34.8869°N 91.1708°W	0550 – 0557	3.31 mi (5.33 km)	200 yd (180 m)	The roof was partially removed from a house and a few other buildings suffered minor roof damage. Several trees were downed and a couple of tractor-trailers were blown over on I-40 as well. One person suffered minor injuries.
EF1	NW of Covington	Tipton	TN	35.6159°N 89.7031°W	1105 – 1109	0.83 mi (1.34 km)	250 yd (230 m)	Two houses suffered significant damage, grain bins were damaged, and a shop was destroyed. Trees were downed as well.
EF0	WSW of Oakwood	Walsh	ND	48.42°N 97.31°W	1853	0.1 mi (0.16 km)	25 yd (23 m)	A brief tornado caused no reported damage.
EF0	NE of Grafton	Walsh	ND	48.44°N 97.32°W	1917 – 1925	2.25 mi (3.62 km)	25 yd (23 m)	A tornado moved along an intermittent path; no damage was reported.
EF0	W of Independence	Montgomery	KS	37.23°N 95.77°W	2118 – 2120	0.42 mi (0.68 km)	50 yd (46 m)	A brief tornado caused no reported damage.
EF0	NE of Omega	Kingfisher	OK	35.8802°N 98.1874°W	2235 – 2237	1 mi (1.6 km)	50 yd (46 m)	Broadcast media and Spotter Network observed a tornado that caused no damage.
EF0	SSW of Calumet	Canadian	OK	35.4987°N 98.12°W	2255 – 2256	0.35 mi (0.56 km)	30 yd (27 m)	Minor tree damage and a convergent wheat pattern was observed.
EF3	WSW of El Reno to W of Yukon	Canadian	OK	35.485°N 98.096°W	2303 – 2344	16.2 mi (26.1 km)	4,576 yd (4,184 m)	8 deaths – See article on this tornado – An erratic and record-breaking tornado, the widest in world history at 2.6 miles (4.2 km), occurred south of El Reno. The tornado featured multiple sub-vortices with winds in excess of 302 miles per hour (486 km/h), as well as additional satellite tornadoes nearby. All eight deaths occurred in vehicles, including members of the TWISTEX team. Another 26 people were injured. Although radar-measured winds far exceeded EF5 threshold, damage indicators which form the basis of the Enhanced Fujita scale only supported EF3 strength across a largely rural area.
EF0	N of Floyd	Floyd	IA	43.1691°N 92.7323°W	2309–2310	0.18 mi (0.29 km)	10 yd (9.1 m)	A brief tornado caused no reported damage.
EF0	NW of Union City	Canadian	OK	35.44°N 98.003°W	2312–2313	0.5 mi (0.80 km)	120 yd (110 m)	Storm chasers and the RaXPol mobile research radar observed a brief satellite tornado rotating around the primary El Reno tornado; no damage was reported.
EF0	SSW of El Reno	Canadian	OK	35.459°N 98.011°W	2313–2314	0.5 mi (0.80 km)	350 yd (320 m)	Storm chasers and the RaXPol mobile research radar observed a brief satellite tornado rotating around the primary El Reno tornado; no damage was reported.
EF0	NW of Hulah	Osage	OK	36.9451°N 96.0678°W	2318	0.1 mi (0.16 km)	50 yd (46 m)	A brief tornado in open country caused no damage.
EF0	SSW of Montgomery City	Montgomery	MO	38.9424°N 91.5188°W	2320 – 2321	0.53 mi (0.85 km)	30 yd (27 m)	A brief tornado snapped power poles and downed many trees, including one that fell onto a parked school bus.
EF0	S of Montgomery City	Montgomery	MO	38.944°N 91.502°W	2321 – 2322	0.21 mi (0.34 km)	30 yd (27 m)	A brief downed many trees and blew the roof off of a machine shed.
EF0	NNW of New Florence	Montgomery	MO	38.939°N 91.460°W	2328 – 2330	1.06 mi (1.71 km)	40 yd (37 m)	Many trees were downed, and a home suffered minor siding and soffit damage.
EF2	SE of El Reno	Canadian	OK	35.4858°N 97.8511°W	2329 – 2341	5 mi (8.0 km)	150 yd (140 m)	A rare, long-lived anticyclonic tornado formed as a satellite tornado to the main El Reno tornado. Some structures and trees were damaged.
EF1	WSW of Pawhuska	Osage	OK	36.6154°N 96.6006°W	2330 – 2337	2.5 mi (4.0 km)	200 yd (180 m)	A tornado remained over mostly open country, although two power poles were snapped.
EF1	NE of Copan	Washington	OK	36.9623°N 95.8343°W	2338 – 2340	1.2 mi (1.9 km)	200 yd (180 m)	A home suffered roof damage and several trees were downed.
EF1	NNE of Mustang to western Oklahoma City	Canadian, Oklahoma	OK	35.454°N 97.699°W	2351 – 0009	5.71 mi (9.19 km)	600 yd (550 m)	A large, slow-moving tornado formed in southwestern Oklahoma City, just to the north of Will Rogers World Airport. Buildings, homes, businesses, trees and powerlines were damaged and many vehicles were overturned on I-44.
EF0	S of El Reno	Canadian	OK	35.4432°N 97.96°W	2355 – 2357	0.47 mi (0.76 km)	50 yd (46 m)	A trained storm spotter reported a tornado, although any damage it caused was indiscernible from the El Reno EF3 tornado.
EF0	ESE of South Coffeyville	Nowata	OK	36.9873°N 95.4317°W	0021 – 0022	1.1 mi (1.8 km)	310 yd (280 m)	Numerous trees were downed.
EF0	N of Templeton	Benton	IN	40.5356°N 87.2048°W	0030 – 0032	0.5 mi (0.80 km)	20 yd (18 m)	Emergency management reported a tornado over open fields; no damage was reported.
EF0	SW of Del City	Oklahoma	OK	35.411°N 97.457°W	0035 – 0037	0.5 mi (0.80 km)	200 yd (180 m)	Trees and power lines were damaged.
EF1	SW of Union	Franklin	MO	38.4095°N 91.0509°W	0037–0050	9.98 mi (16.06 km)	500 yd (460 m)	Damage was confined to downed trees.
EF1	W of Moore	Cleveland	OK	35.341°N 97.609°W	0042 – 0043	1 mi (1.6 km)	100 yd (91 m)	Several homes, trees, power poles, and power lines were damaged.
EF0	NNE of Tuttle	Grady	OK	35.321°N 97.799°W	0045	0.2 mi (0.32 km)	50 yd (46 m)	Two storm chasers filmed a tornado; no known damage occurred.
EF3	SW of Weldon Spring to Riverview	St. Charles, St. Louis, St. Louis City	MO	38.6867°N 90.7498°W	0050 – 0125	31.8 mi (51.2 km)	1,760 yd (1,610 m)	See section on this tornado – Two people suffered minor injuries in St. Charles County.
EF1	Southwestern Oklahoma City	Oklahoma	OK	35.406°N 97.551°W	0053 – 0055	1.13 mi (1.82 km)	300 yd (270 m)	Roofs and trees were damaged.
EF1	ESE of Catawissa	Jefferson	MO	38.4013°N 90.7322°W	0101–0118	12.41 mi (19.97 km)	200 yd (180 m)	Damage was confined to downed trees.
EF3	NE of Bellefontaine Neighbors, MO to N of Edwardsville, IL	St. Louis (MO), Madison (IL)	MO, IL	38.8009°N 90.1493°W	0127 – 0137	10.6 mi (17.1 km)	150 yd (140 m)	A narrow, but destructive high-end EF3 tornado touched down just inside Missouri, southwest of Roxana, Illinois. It downed trees in rural northeastern St. Louis County and then quickly crossed the Mississippi River at its confluence with the Missouri River and into Madison County, Illinois. The tornado damaged a commercial building and snapped power poles in southern Hartford and then moved through the town of South Roxana, where it destroyed a wood-frame metal-sided storage building and caused heavy damage to a steel-framework industrial warehouse building (where a wall was buckled and steel roof girders were twisted) at a landfill just east of town. The tornado continued to north of Edwardsville before it dissipated.
EF1	NW of Talala to SW of Watova	Rogers, Nowata	OK	36.5886°N 95.7326°W	0121 – 0126	3.5 mi (5.6 km)	320 yd (290 m)	A high-end EF1 tornado downed many trees.
EF1	NNE of Talala to ENE of Watova	Rogers, Nowata	OK	36.5972°N 95.6760°W	0127 – 0135	4.8 mi (7.7 km)	350 yd (320 m)	This high-end EF1 tornado developed immediately after the previous one dissipated. A mobile home and a barn were destroyed, several homes were damaged, and numerous trees were downed. Two people were injured.
EF2	Gillespie	Macoupin	IL	39.1287°N 89.8272°W	0149 – 0152	1.47 mi (2.37 km)	150 yd (140 m)	A low-end EF2 tornado moved through Gillespie. Several homes and a school gymnasium sustained extensive roof and wall damage, three garages were destroyed, and many trees and power poles were downed.
EF1	SW of Zanesville to ESE of Waggoner	Montgomery	IL	39.3309°N 89.6815°W	0200 – 0206	4.26 mi (6.86 km)	50 yd (46 m)	Numerous large trees were snapped, barns, outbuildings, and machine sheds were severely damaged, and three tractor trailers were blown over on I-55. The windows were blown in at a two-story farm house as well.
EF1	Northwestern Decatur	Macon	IL	39.8586°N 88.9856°W	0303 – 0307	1.99 mi (3.20 km)	100 yd (91 m)	A television shop lost its roof and sustained broken windows and siding damage while other structures sustained minor roof damage. Numerous trees were downed as well.
EF0	SW of Grove	Delaware	OK	36.5379°N 94.8236°W	0423 – 0427	1.8 mi (2.9 km)	500 yd (460 m)	Many trees were downed.
EF1	NNW of Meeks	Vermilion	IL	40.0232°N 87.5961°W	0424 – 0425	0.49 mi (0.79 km)	70 yd (64 m)	A home's garage was pulled from its foundation and pushed about 10 feet (3.0 m) on top of the car inside, severely damaging it and part of the house. A large barn was also damaged, and several trees were splintered.

== See also ==
- Tornadoes of 2013
- List of United States tornadoes from March to April 2013
- List of United States tornadoes from June to July 2013
