= Catherine Ellis =

Catherine Ellis, Katherine Ellis, or variants of the name, may refer to:

- Catherine Ellis (ethnomusicologist) (1935–1996), Australian academic
- Catherine Ellis, presenter of The Bounce (TV series), a 2010 Australian TV sports program
- Kate Ellis (author) (fl. from 1998), British author of crime fiction
- Kate Ellis (politician) (born 1977), Australian politician
- Katherine Ellis (born 1965), English dance music vocalist and songwriter
- Katherine Ellis, American actress in 2001 telemovie Motocrossed
- Kathy Ellis (born 1946), American former swimmer

== See also ==
- Catherine Township, Ellis County, Kansas
