= Winch Creek =

Stream in the American state of Missouri

Winch Creek is a stream in eastern Franklin County in the U.S. state of Missouri. Winch Creek is a tributary to the Meramec River.

The stream headwaters are at 38°24′17″N 90°44′50″W and the confluence with the Meramec is at 38°26′42″N 90°45′17″W. The source area is adjacent to the eastern border of the county and the stream flows north parallel to the border for about one mile and then turns to the west and flows roughly parallel to Missouri Route O for two miles to the community of Catawissa. Just east of Catawissa the stream turns north and flows north to northeast roughly parallel to the railroad for about two miles to its confluence with the Meramec just downstream from the community of Prater.

According to tradition, Winch Creek has the name of a local Indian.

== See also ==
- List of rivers of Missouri
