= Shea, Nebraska =

Ghost town in Nebraska, United States

Coordinates: 40.1147°N 97.0017°W

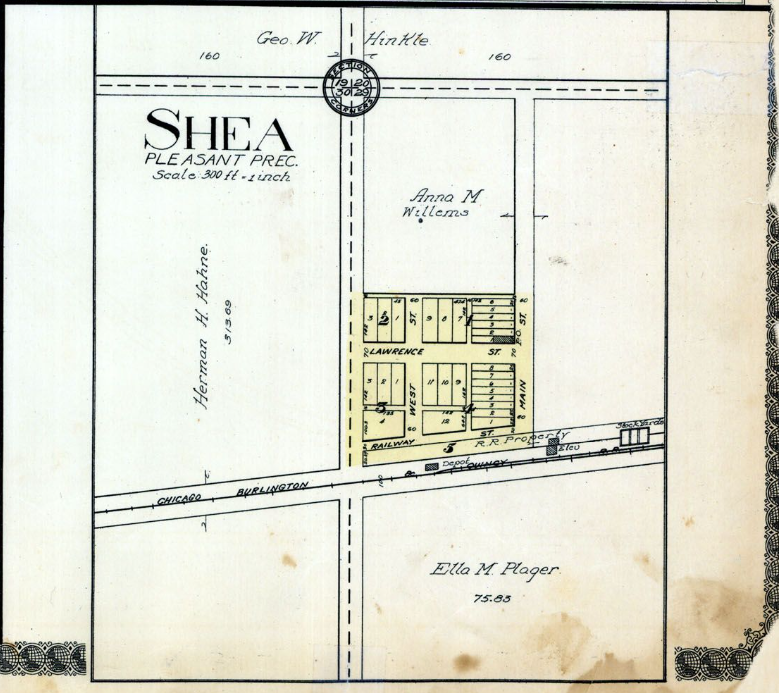
The village of Shea, Nebraska in 1917.

Shea was a small village in Jefferson County, Nebraska, located about four miles west of the town of Diller.

== History ==
Shea began as a railroad siding and grain elevator that was informally called Fitzgerald's Siding. In 1901, the Burlington Railroad inaugurated its St. Louis to Denver route, necessitating the laying of 800 feet of new track at the site. The name Fitzgerald's Siding was deemed too long, so as a convenience to the railroad the name was changed to Shea, honoring the pioneer John Shea, who had settled in the area.

In 1905, the landowner Otto Willems constructed a brick building at Shea and partnered with son-in-law August Kunter to establish a general mercantile business for the surrounding farmers. Willems & Kunter was Shea's first business establishment.

Otto Willems' widow, Anna, hired civil engineer W. W. Watson in 1907 to plat a town site, resulting in four square blocks with 13 lots to be used for business, the rest for residential. Streets included Main Street, Lawrence Street, West Street, and Railway Street.

At various times during its heyday in the 1910s and 1920s, Shea had a mercantile business, a barber shop, a grocery store, a post office, a blacksmith shop, a grain elevator, stockyards, a community hall, and a railroad depot with occasional passenger service. Shea's population most likely never exceeded 50 residents.

Shea did not make it through the Great Depression. By 1941, the once-thriving little village had reverted to just a grain elevator with a residence or two.

== See also ==
- List of ghost towns in Nebraska
