= Waggoner, Illinois =

- Village
- Location in Montgomery County, Illinois
- Coordinates: 39°22′34″N 89°39′09″W
- Country: United States
- State: Illinois
- County: Montgomery
- Township: Pitman

Area
  - Total: 0.24 sq mi (0.63 km^{2})
  - Land: 0.24 sq mi (0.63 km^{2})
  - Water: 0 sq mi (0.00 km^{2})
- Elevation: 643 ft (196 m)

Population (2020)
  - Total: 181
  - Density: 741.2/sq mi (286.19/km^{2})
- Time zone: UTC-6 (CST)
  - Summer (DST): UTC-5 (CDT)
- ZIP code: 62572
- Area code: 217
- FIPS code: 17-78383
- GNIS feature ID: 2400080

Waggoner is a village in Montgomery County, Illinois, United States. The population was 181 at the 2020 census, down from 266 in 2010 census.

== Geography ==
Waggoner is in northwestern Montgomery County, 8 miles (13 km) northwest of Raymond and 21 miles (34 km) northwest of Hillsboro, the county seat. Interstate 55 passes just east of the village limits but does not have an exit for it. The closest access is 4 miles (6 km) to the south from Exit 63 in Zanesville or 4.5 miles (7.2 km) to the north from Exit 72 in Farmersville.

According to the U.S. Census Bureau, Waggoner has a total area of 0.24 square miles (0.62 km^{2}), all land. The village drains south to tributaries of Horse Creek, a west-flowing tributary of Macoupin Creek and part of the Illinois River watershed.

== Demographics ==
Historical population
Census	Pop.	Note	%±
1900	268		—
1910	270		0.7%
1920	307		13.7%
1930	267		−13.0%
1940	249		−6.7%
1950	239		−4.0%
1960	219		−8.4%
1970	257		17.4%
1980	277		7.8%
1990	221		−20.2%
2000	245		10.9%
2010	266		8.6%
2020	181		−32.0%
U.S. Decennial Census

As of the census of 2000, there were 245 people, 93 households, and 65 families residing in the village. The population density was 929.8 inhabitants per square mile (359.0/km^{2}). There were 102 housing units at an average density of 387.1 per square mile (149.5/km^{2}). The racial makeup of the village was 99.18% White and 0.82% Native American.

There were 93 households, out of which 35.5% had children under the age of 18 living with them, 55.9% were married couples living together, 8.6% had a female householder with no husband present, and 30.1% were non-families. 21.5% of all households were made up of individuals, and 10.8% had someone living alone who was 65 years of age or older. The average household size was 2.63 and the average family size was 3.09.

In the village, the population was spread out, with 26.9% under the age of 18, 13.9% from 18 to 24, 33.1% from 25 to 44, 13.5% from 45 to 64, and 12.7% who were 65 years of age or older. The median age was 30 years. For every 100 females, there were 99.2 males. For every 100 females age 18 and over, there were 98.9 males.

The median income for a household in the village was $30,938, and the median income for a family was $40,125. Males had a median income of $36,250 versus $22,083 for females. The per capita income for the village was $12,534. About 6.3% of families and 12.3% of the population were below the poverty line, including 18.1% of those under the age of eighteen and 8.3% of those 65 or over.

== Local events ==
=== Waggoner Centennial Play ===
The Waggoner Centennial Players hold an annual play that is made up of local citizens and is held at the Waggoner Centennial Building. The Waggoner Centennial Players celebrated their 25th anniversary with their 2013 production. More than 1,000 tickets are sold for the play in the town of 200 people.
