= Catawissa, Missouri =

Unincorporated community in Missouri, U.S.

Coordinates: 38°25′29″N 90°46′57″W

Catawissa is a small Unincorporated community in Franklin County, Missouri, United States, on the St. Louis & San Francisco Railroad, 39 miles from St. Louis and four miles south-southwest of Pacific. It is located at the junction of Route N and Route O, southwest of Pacific. Winch Creek flows past the eastern margin of the community.

Catawissa was laid out in 1858, and most likely was named after Catawissa, Pennsylvania. A post office called Catawissa has been in operation since 1860.
