= Pernell, Oklahoma =

Unincorporated community in Oklahoma, US

- Unincorporated community
- Location within Oklahoma Location within the United States
- Coordinates: 34°33′41″N 97°30′36″W
- Country: United States
- State: Oklahoma
- County: Garvin
- Elevation: 997 ft (304 m)
- Time zone: UTC-6 (Central (CST))
  - Summer (DST): UTC-5 (CDT)
- ZIP code: 73433
- Area code: 580
- GNIS feature ID: 1100731

Pernell is an unincorporated community in Garvin County, Oklahoma, United States. Pernell is located on Oklahoma State Highway 76, 8 miles (13 km) southwest of Elmore City. Pernell had a post office, which opened on June 28, 1922, and closed on December 27, 2003. After the post office closed, Pernell addresses were incorporated with Elmore City. The community was named after resident Thomas Pernell.
