= Watova, Oklahoma =

- Census-designated place
- Location within Oklahoma Location within the United States
- Coordinates: 36°37′11″N 95°39′37″W
- Country: United States
- State: Oklahoma
- County: Nowata

Area
  - Total: 0.57 sq mi (1.48 km^{2})
  - Land: 0.57 sq mi (1.48 km^{2})
  - Water: 0 sq mi (0.00 km^{2})
- Elevation: 742 ft (226 m)

Population (2020)
  - Total: 32
  - Density: 56.0/sq mi (21.61/km^{2})
- Time zone: UTC-6 (Central (CST))
  - Summer (DST): UTC-5 (CDT)
- ZIP Code: 74048 (Nowata)
- Area codes: 918/539
- FIPS code: 40-79000
- GNIS feature ID: 2812861

Watova is an unincorporated community and census-designated place (CDP) in Nowata County, Oklahoma, United States. It was first listed as a CDP prior to the 2020 census. As of the 2020 census, Watova had a population of 32.

The CDP is in southern Nowata County, on the west side of U.S. Route 169, which leads north 6 miles (10 km) to Nowata, the county seat, and south 35 miles (56 km) to the outskirts of Tulsa.

== Demographics ==
Historical population
Census	Pop.	Note	%±
2020	32		—
U.S. Decennial Census

=== 2020 census ===
As of the 2020 census, Watova had a population of 32. The median age was 56.5 years. 21.9% of residents were under the age of 18 and 31.3% of residents were 65 years of age or older. For every 100 females there were 88.2 males, and for every 100 females age 18 and over there were 78.6 males age 18 and over.

0.0% of residents lived in urban areas, while 100.0% lived in rural areas.

There were 12 households in Watova, of which 16.7% had children under the age of 18 living in them. Of all households, 66.7% were married-couple households, 25.0% were households with a male householder and no spouse or partner present, and 8.3% were households with a female householder and no spouse or partner present. About 25.0% of all households were made up of individuals and 16.6% had someone living alone who was 65 years of age or older.

There were 15 housing units, of which 20.0% were vacant. The homeowner vacancy rate was 0.0% and the rental vacancy rate was 0.0%.

Racial composition as of the 2020 census
Race	Number	Percent
White	20	62.5%
Black or African American	0	0.0%
American Indian and Alaska Native	6	18.8%
Asian	0	0.0%
Native Hawaiian and Other Pacific Islander	0	0.0%
Some other race	0	0.0%
Two or more races	6	18.8%
Hispanic or Latino (of any race)	1	3.1%
