= Catherine Township, Kansas =

Catherine Township
- Township
- Location in Ellis County
- Coordinates: 39°02′30″N 099°09′31″W
- Country: United States
- State: Kansas
- County: Ellis

Area
  - Total: 80.43 sq mi (208.31 km^{2})
  - Land: 80.40 sq mi (208.24 km^{2})
  - Water: 0.027 sq mi (0.07 km^{2}) 0.03%
- Elevation: 2,047 ft (624 m)

Population (2000)
  - Total: 312
  - Density: 3.9/sq mi (1.5/km^{2})
- GNIS feature ID: 0472447

Catherine Township was a township in Ellis County, Kansas, United States. In the 2010 census, its population was 312. It included the unincorporated settlement of Catharine, Kansas, whose population was 113 in the 2020 census.

The township was dissolved into Buckeye Township in 2023.

== Geography ==
Catherine Township covered an area of 80.43 square miles (208.3 km^{2}) and contained no incorporated settlements. According to the USGS, it contained two cemeteries: Norman and Saint Catharina.
