= Harbine, Nebraska =

- Village
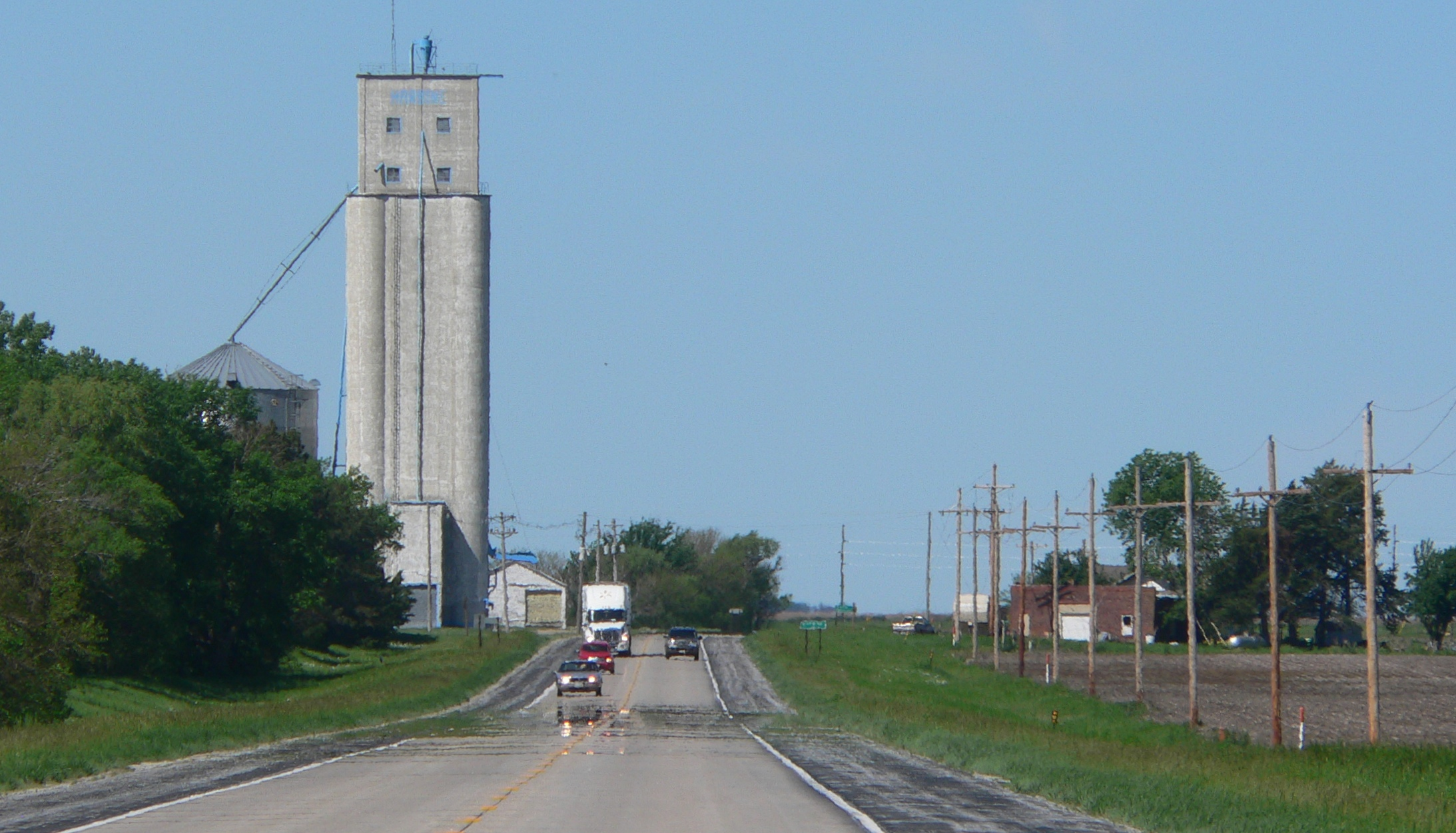
- Harbine, seen from the northeast along U.S. Highway 136

- Location of Harbine, Nebraska
- Coordinates: 40°11′30″N 96°58′27″W
- Country: United States
- State: Nebraska
- County: Jefferson

Area
  - Total: 0.10 sq mi (0.27 km^{2})
  - Land: 0.10 sq mi (0.27 km^{2})
  - Water: 0 sq mi (0.00 km^{2})
- Elevation: 1,444 ft (440 m)

Population (2020)
  - Total: 54
  - Estimate (2021): 53
  - Density: 520/sq mi (200/km^{2})
- Time zone: UTC-6 (Central (CST))
  - Summer (DST): UTC-5 (CDT)
- ZIP code: 68377
- Area code: 402
- FIPS code: 31-20960
- GNIS feature ID: 2398246

Harbine is a village in Jefferson County, Nebraska, United States. The population was 54 at the 2020 census.

== History ==
Harbine was established in 1886 when the Chicago, Rock Island, and Pacific Railroad was extended to that point. It was named for its founder, Thomas Harbine.

== Geography ==
According to the United States Census Bureau, the village has a total area of 0.11 square miles (0.28 km^{2}), all land.

== Demographics ==
Historical population
Census	Pop.	Note	%±
1920	107		—
1930	106		−0.9%
1940	63		−40.6%
1950	85		34.9%
1960	58		−31.8%
1970	44		−24.1%
1980	50		13.6%
1990	66		32.0%
2000	56		−15.2%
2010	49		−12.5%
2020	56		14.3%
2021 (est.)	54	▼	−3.6%
U.S. Decennial Census

=== 2010 census ===
As of the census of 2010, there were 49 people, 21 households, and 16 families residing in the village. The population density was 445.5 inhabitants per square mile (172.0/km^{2}). There were 25 housing units at an average density of 227.3 per square mile (87.8/km^{2}). The racial makeup of the village was 100.0% White. Hispanic or Latino of any race were 12.2% of the population.

There were 21 households, of which 28.6% had children under the age of 18 living with them, 66.7% were married couples living together, 4.8% had a female householder with no husband present, 4.8% had a male householder with no wife present, and 23.8% were non-families. 19.0% of all households were made up of individuals, and 9.6% had someone living alone who was 65 years of age or older. The average household size was 2.33 and the average family size was 2.63.

The median age in the village was 51.3 years. 14.3% of residents were under the age of 18; 6.1% were between the ages of 18 and 24; 18.3% were from 25 to 44; 48.9% were from 45 to 64; and 12.2% were 65 years of age or older. The gender makeup of the village was 55.1% male and 44.9% female.

=== 2000 census ===
As of the census of 2000, there were 56 people, 24 households, and 15 families residing in the village. The population density was 560.3 inhabitants per square mile (216.3/km^{2}). There were 25 housing units at an average density of 250.1 per square mile (96.6/km^{2}). The racial makeup of the village was 100.00% White.

There were 24 households, out of which 37.5% had children under the age of 18 living with them, 50.0% were married couples living together, 8.3% had a female householder with no husband present, and 37.5% were non-families. 33.3% of all households were made up of individuals, and 12.5% had someone living alone who was 65 years of age or older. The average household size was 2.33 and the average family size was 2.93.

In the village, the population was spread out, with 23.2% under the age of 18, 10.7% from 18 to 24, 25.0% from 25 to 44, 28.6% from 45 to 64, and 12.5% who were 65 years of age or older. The median age was 42 years. For every 100 females, there were 115.4 males. For every 100 females age 18 and over, there were 115.0 males.

As of 2000 the median income for a household in the village was $34,500, and the median income for a family was $40,833. Males had a median income of $32,500 versus $18,438 for females. The per capita income for the village was $14,688. There were no families and 3.4% of the population living below the poverty line, including no one under eighteen and none of those over 64.with many open areas in the country.
