= Calumet, Oklahoma =

Town in Oklahoma, US

- Town
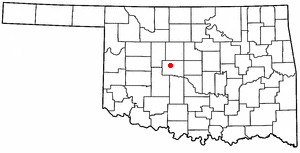
- Location of Calumet, Oklahoma
- Coordinates: 35°36′2″N 98°7′13″W
- Country: United States
- State: Oklahoma
- County: Canadian

Area
  - Total: 1.26 sq mi (3.27 km^{2})
  - Land: 1.26 sq mi (3.27 km^{2})
  - Water: 0 sq mi (0.00 km^{2})
- Elevation: 1,388 ft (423 m)

Population (2020)
  - Total: 443
  - Density: 350.5/sq mi (135.33/km^{2})
- Time zone: UTC-6 (Central (CST))
  - Summer (DST): UTC-5 (CDT)
- ZIP code: 73014
- Area code: 405
- FIPS code: 40-11050
- GNIS feature ID: 1090810
- Website: www.townofcalumetok.com

Calumet is a town in Canadian County, Oklahoma, United States. It is part of the Oklahoma City Metropolitan Area. As of the 2020 census, Calumet had a population of 443.

Calumet is a variant term for Ceremonial pipe. Incorporated in 1942, the town's land was settled in the Land Run of 1892.

== History ==
Calumet incorporated in 1942 in order to construct a town water system. Prior to its incorporation, the town existed as an unincorporated community with a post office, three combination mills and elevators, two general stores, a furniture store, and a hardware store.

The town lies in an area that in 1803 was part of the Louisiana Purchase. After the Organic Act of 1890 recreated the area as Oklahoma Territory, present-day Canadian County was designated as County Four and settled by non-Indian settlers through the Land Run of 1889, the Land Run of 1892, and a 1901 land lottery. The Land Run of 1892 opened up the surplus Cheyenne-Arapaho lands to non-Indian settlement, which opened up Calumet.

== Geography ==
Calumet is located on US Route 270 in northwestern Canadian County, 11 miles northwest of El Reno and 11 miles east of Geary and 1.5 miles south of the North Canadian River. It is on the border of the Red Bed Plains and Gypsum Hills ecoregions of Oklahoma.

According to the United States Census Bureau, the town has a total land area of 1.3 square miles (3.4 km^{2}), all land.

=== Climate ===
Climate data for Calumet, Oklahoma
Month	Jan	Feb	Mar	Apr	May	Jun	Jul	Aug	Sep	Oct	Nov	Dec	Year
Mean daily maximum °F (°C)	46.9 (8.3)	52.1 (11.2)	62.4 (16.9)	72.7 (22.6)	80.3 (26.8)	88.4 (31.3)	94.4 (34.7)	93.4 (34.1)	84.6 (29.2)	73.7 (23.2)	59.8 (15.4)	49.2 (9.6)	71.5 (21.9)
Mean daily minimum °F (°C)	24.2 (−4.3)	28.6 (−1.9)	37.3 (2.9)	47.6 (8.7)	56.3 (13.5)	65.1 (18.4)	69.9 (21.1)	68.3 (20.2)	60.9 (16.1)	49.6 (9.8)	37.2 (2.9)	27.5 (−2.5)	47.7 (8.7)
Average precipitation inches (mm)	0.8 (20)	1.2 (30)	2.1 (53)	2.4 (61)	4.5 (110)	4.3 (110)	2.1 (53)	2.2 (56)	3.8 (97)	2.2 (56)	1.7 (43)	0.9 (23)	28.1 (710)
Source: Weatherbase.com

== Demographics ==
Historical population
Census	Pop.	Note	%±
1950	339		—
1960	354		4.4%
1970	386		9.0%
1980	469		21.5%
1990	560		19.4%
2000	535		−4.5%
2010	507		−5.2%
2020	443		−12.6%
U.S. Decennial Census

=== 2020 census ===
As of the 2020 census, Calumet had a population of 443. The median age was 36.1 years. 28.2% of residents were under the age of 18 and 16.0% of residents were 65 years of age or older. For every 100 females there were 94.3 males, and for every 100 females age 18 and over there were 87.1 males age 18 and over.

0.0% of residents lived in urban areas, while 100.0% lived in rural areas.

There were 165 households in Calumet, of which 44.2% had children under the age of 18 living in them. Of all households, 52.1% were married-couple households, 16.4% were households with a male householder and no spouse or partner present, and 26.1% were households with a female householder and no spouse or partner present. About 22.4% of all households were made up of individuals and 10.3% had someone living alone who was 65 years of age or older.

There were 200 housing units, of which 17.5% were vacant. The homeowner vacancy rate was 3.2% and the rental vacancy rate was 26.2%.

Racial composition as of the 2020 census
Race	Number	Percent
White	335	75.6%
Black or African American	3	0.7%
American Indian and Alaska Native	39	8.8%
Asian	4	0.9%
Native Hawaiian and Other Pacific Islander	0	0.0%
Some other race	5	1.1%
Two or more races	57	12.9%
Hispanic or Latino (of any race)	36	8.1%

=== 2010 census ===
As of the 2010 United States census, there were 507 people, 187 households, and 130 families residing in the town. The population density was 390 inhabitants per square mile (150/km^{2}). There were 214 housing units at an average density of 164.6 per square mile (63.6/km^{2}). The racial makeup of the town was 78.9% white, 13.6% Native American, 0.4% Asian, 2.4% from other races, and 4.7% from two or more races. Hispanics or Latinos were 4% of the population.

There were 187 households, out of which 40.6% had children under the age of 18 living with them, 69.5% were married couples living together, 9.6% had a female householder with no husband present, and 30.5% were non-families. Less than a third of households (28.9%) were made up of individuals, and 13.4% had someone living alone who was 65 years of age or older. The average household size was 2.71 and the average family size was 3.28.

In the town, the population was spread out, with 29.6% under the age of 18, 8.4% from 18 to 24, 25.4% from 25 to 44, 24% from 45 to 64, and 12.6% who were 65 years of age or older. The median age was 36.2 years. For every 100 females, there were 91.3 males. For every 100 females age 18 and over, there were X males.

The median income for a household in the town was $50,625, (compared to a national median income of $52,762) and the median income for a family was $56,607. Males had a median income of $46,786 versus $26,875 for females. The per capita income for the town was $27,113. An estimated 8% of families and 9.5% of the population were below the poverty line, including 12.6% of those under age 18.

== Education ==
Calumet contains three schools housed in two separate buildings: an elementary school, a junior high, and a high school. A fourth school, Maple Public School, is separate from the Calumet school district.
