= Talala, Oklahoma =

Talala
- Town
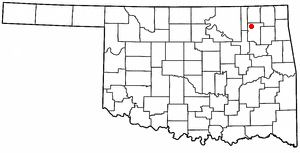
- Location of Talala, Oklahoma
- Coordinates: 36°31′46″N 95°42′04″W
- Country: United States
- State: Oklahoma
- County: Rogers

Area
  - Total: 0.45 sq mi (1.16 km^{2})
  - Land: 0.45 sq mi (1.16 km^{2})
  - Water: 0 sq mi (0.00 km^{2})
- Elevation: 682 ft (208 m)

Population (2020)
  - Total: 258
  - Density: 575.8/sq mi (222.33/km^{2})
- Time zone: UTC−6 (Central (CST))
  - Summer (DST): UTC−5 (CDT)
- ZIP Code: 74080
- Area codes: 539/918
- FIPS code: 40-72200
- GNIS feature ID: 2413362
- Website: talalaok.gov

Talala is a town in Rogers County, Oklahoma, United States. As of the 2020 census, Talala had a population of 258.

== History ==
The Talala Post Office was established June 23, 1890. Talala was named for Captain John Talala of the 3rd Regiment, Indian Home Guard and a prominent Cherokee. It is mentioned in the Talala History Book that the word ta la la is associated with the tapping of a woodpecker's bill, which the woodpecker is a red-headed woodpecker that had these numerous birds there and even today. Talala is a Cherokee word for the Red-Headed Woodpecker. An Indian made this discovery and so the town has taken this bird as part of its legacy, erecting signs on the North and South end of the town, and on its stationery at Town Hall and in the Museum.

== Museum ==
On the property of the Museum, which was the original site of the Talala Post Office decades earlier, lies a statue made by the Talala artist Sandra VanZandt of two eagles with bricks surrounding it. In May 2012 three plaques honoring World War II veterans were displayed proudly nearby. Inside and within its walls lies most of the town's history.

== Geography ==
Talala is 19 miles (31 km) northwest of Claremore, the county seat.

According to the United States Census Bureau, the town has a total area of 0.3 square miles (0.78 km^{2}), all land.

== Demographics ==
Historical population
Census	Pop.	Note	%±
1910	340		—
1920	107		−68.5%
1930	198		85.0%
1940	188		−5.1%
1950	210		11.7%
1960	147		−30.0%
1970	163		10.9%
1980	191		17.2%
1990	206		7.9%
2000	250		21.4%
2010	273		9.2%
2020	258		−5.5%
U.S. Decennial Census

=== 2020 census ===
As of the 2020 census, Talala had a population of 258. The median age was 36.3 years. 25.2% of residents were under the age of 18 and 14.3% of residents were 65 years of age or older. For every 100 females there were 98.5 males, and for every 100 females age 18 and over there were 96.9 males age 18 and over.

0.0% of residents lived in urban areas, while 100.0% lived in rural areas.

There were 95 households in Talala, of which 37.9% had children under the age of 18 living in them. Of all households, 42.1% were married-couple households, 26.3% were households with a male householder and no spouse or partner present, and 22.1% were households with a female householder and no spouse or partner present. About 20.0% of all households were made up of individuals and 9.5% had someone living alone who was 65 years of age or older.

There were 110 housing units, of which 13.6% were vacant. The homeowner vacancy rate was 7.0% and the rental vacancy rate was 0.0%.

Racial composition as of the 2020 census
Race	Number	Percent
White	154	59.7%
Black or African American	0	0.0%
American Indian and Alaska Native	40	15.5%
Asian	0	0.0%
Native Hawaiian and Other Pacific Islander	0	0.0%
Some other race	3	1.2%
Two or more races	61	23.6%
Hispanic or Latino (of any race)	18	7.0%

=== 2010 census ===
As of the census of 2010, there were 273 people and 81 families residing in the town. The population density was 910 inhabitants per square mile (350/km^{2}). There were 128 housing units at an average density of 426.6 per square mile (164.7/km^{2}). The racial makeup of the town was 71.4% White, 0.0% African American, 20.5% Native American, 0.0% Asian, and 8.1% from two or more races. Hispanic or Latino of any race were 0.7% of the population.

There were 109 households, out of which 33.0% had children under the age of 18 living with them, 51.4% were married couples living together, 14.7% had a female householder with no husband present, and 25.7% were non-families. Of all households 22.9% were made up of individuals, and 7.3% had someone living alone who was 65 years of age or older. The average household size was 2.50 and the average family size was 2.85.

In the town, the population was spread out, with 25.6% under the age of 18, 7.7% from 19 to 24, 29.4% from 25 to 44, 23.9% from 45 to 64, and 13.6% who were 65 years of age or older. The median age was 37.8 years. For every 100 females, there were 103.7 males. For every 100 females age 18 and over, there were 101.0 males.

The median income for a household in the town was $40,833, and the median income for a family was $58,250. Males had a median income of $40,833 versus $28,125 for females. The per capita income for the town was $17,810. About 5.9% of families and 8.2% of the population were below the poverty line, including 10.8% of those under the age of eighteen and none of those 65 or over.

== Notable residents ==
- Edwin Evers – professional bass fisherman
- Roy W. Harmon - WWII Medal of Honor recipient
