= Bootleg, Texas =

Bootleg
- Unincorporated community
- Interactive map of Bootleg
- Location within Texas Bootleg (the United States)
- Coordinates: 34°49′44″N 102°48′51″W
- Country: United States
- State: Texas
- County: Deaf Smith County
- Postal code: 79035

Bootleg, also known as Bootleg Corner, is a small, unincorporated community in southwestern Deaf Smith County, Texas, United States, located 4124 feet (1257 meters) above sea level.

== Etymology ==
There are two theories regarding the etymology of this community's name. One suggests that it is associated with the Moonshine Sheep Camp, a campsite for cowboys and travellers from La Plata to Endee, where moonshine was available. Another theory ties it to a "bootleg school"; a small school that was relocated several times by land agents working for the Capitol Syndicate to deceive potential customers into thinking that there was a school near the land they were investing into.

== History ==
One of the first formal schools in the area was the Messenger school, with J. N. Messenger as its founder. After that, a school called the Walcott School was built amid the Walcott, Piatt, Arnold, and O'Brien ranches in 1914, which changed location several times until 1950, when the ranch where it was located became a part of the Walcott district and an unnamed brick school was erected on the north of Bootleg.

During the 1930s no streets were present in the area, but trails were imprinted into the pastures due to frequent use by cars and trucks. At the same time, Bootleg experienced an economic growth after Louis Woodford converted the bootleg school into a general store, which then became a trading post for the western part of the Deaf Smith County.

The community has a volunteer fire department called the Bootleg Volunteer Fire Department serving the area around Hereford, with an unknown establishment date.

== Wildlife ==
Antelopes are commonly seen in the Bootleg area.
