= Owosso Public Schools =

School district in Michigan

Address
- 645 Alger St. Owosso, Shiawassee, Michigan, 48867; United States

District information
- Grades: Pre-Kindergarten-12
- Superintendent: Steve Brooks
- Schools: 6
- Budget: $46,525,000 2022-2023 expenditures
- NCES District ID: 2627210

Students and staff
- Students: 2,863 (2024-2025)
- Teachers: 173.26 (on an FTE basis) (2024-2025)
- Staff: 382.5 FTE (2024-2025)
- Student–teacher ratio: 16.52 (2024-2025)

Other information
- Website: www.owosso.k12.mi.us

Owosso Public Schools is a public school district in Shiawassee County, Michigan. It serves Owosso and parts of Middletown, and parts of the townships of Bennington, Caledonia, Hazelton, New Haven, Middlebury, Owosso, Rush, Sciota, and Shiawassee.

== History ==
School District No. 1 of Owosso Township, the current district's predecessor, was established in 1837. It was not until 1840 that a public school was built (at the southeast corner of Washington and Williams Streets) and instruction began, although the town had a private school that was held in a log house.

With the town's incorporation in 1859, Owosso's district became a union school district. A new building, the Union School, was built that year to house all grades. It underwent several expansions, culminating in a partial rebuild after a fire in 1900. It was joined by two new elementary schools in the 1890s. The first high school class graduated in 1870, and for a period of time beginning about 1880, an Owosso High School diploma was enough to gain admission to the University of Michigan.

The district added a fourth school in 1915 to accommodate a growing enrollment of 1,800 students. The new Lincoln School, which opened in January 1916, served students from kindergarten through eighth grade. It is recognized as an embodiment of typical school architecture of its era and is listed on the National Register of Historic Places. The Union School continued to house the high school. As the district grew, a dedicated high school was built in 1929 on the west side of Water Street at Mason Street, and Washington Elementary was built that same year.

Twenty-two rural districts in Owosso’s surrounding townships—many consisting of a single schoolhouse—were consolidated into the district between 1957 and 1962, and all but five were immediately closed. The current Owosso High School was built in 1962. It was designed by architecture firm Kingscott Associates and, according to the Flint Journal, "used an unusual color approach with a wide variety of colors using glazed tile and terrazo." The dedication ceremony, on December 9, 1962, featured Owosso High School alumnus and former governor of New York Thomas E. Dewey.

Since the current high school's opening, the Lincoln School was used as a junior high until 1980, and used by the maintenance department until 2005, and then was used as Lincoln Alternative High School until 2011. That year, the alternative high school moved to the former Washington Elementary. The 1929 high school building was used as a middle school until 2022, when the middle school moved to the high school campus.

== Schools ==
Schools in Owosso Public Schools district
School	Address	Notes
Bentley Bright Beginnings	1375 West North Street, Owosso	Preschool
Emerson Elementary	515 East Oliver Street, Owosso	Grades K-5
Bryant Elementary	925 Hampton Street, Owosso	Grades K-5
Central Elementary	600 West Oliver Street, Owosso	Grades K-5
Owosso Middle School	765 East North Street, Owosso	Grades 6-8
Owosso High School	765 East North Street, Owosso	Grades 9-12. Built 1962.
Lincoln High School	645 Alger Street, Owosso	Alternative high school. Grades 9-12. Built 1929.
