= Baker College =

Private, non-profit college in Michigan, US

Coordinates: 42°58′36″N 83°41′50″W

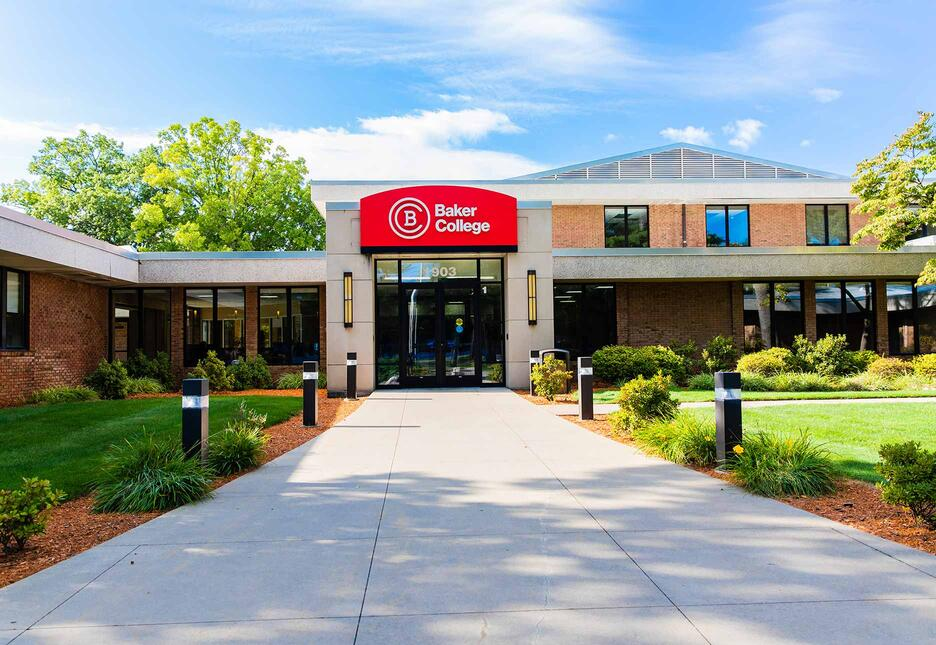
- Campus main entrance
- Former name: Baker Business University
- Type: Private, non profit university
- Established: 1911; 115 years ago
- Accreditation: Baker College is accredited by the Higher Learning Commission, holds more than 20 programmatic accreditations, and has received the Exemplary Endorsement for Online Programs from the Online Learning Consortium.
- Affiliations: Culinary Institute of Michigan, Auto/Diesel Institute
- Religious affiliation: none
- Endowment: $353.2 million (2025)
- President: Jacqui Spicer
- Students: 4,969 (fall 2021)
- Undergraduates: 4,662 (fall 2021)
- Postgraduates: 307 (fall 2021)
- Location: Owosso; Royal Oak; Muskegon; Jackson; Cadillac; Port Huron, Michigan, United States
- Campus: Urban, 53 acres (21 ha)
- Website: www.baker.edu

Baker College is a private, nonprofit college with its main campuses in Owosso and Royal Oak, Michigan, United States. It was founded in 1911 and (as of 2023) has four additional campuses throughout the Lower Peninsula of Michigan.

== History ==
Baker College started as Baker Business University, which was founded in 1911 in Flint, Michigan by Eldon E. Baker. In 1965 it merged with Muskegon College when representatives of the Jewell family, who owned and managed Muskegon College, bought Baker Business University. The university changed its name to Baker Junior College in 1974 and became a non-profit corporation in 1977.

In 1983, the Owosso extension of Baker Junior College was established on the property of the former John Wesley College.

In 2008, a closed auto dealership in Flint, Michigan was renovated and transformed into the Baker College Center for Transportation technology, opening to students in 2009. Baker College's Culinary Institute of Michigan (CIM) opened in 2009 to students interested in studying culinary arts, baking and pastry arts, and food and beverage management. The three-story, 39,000-square-foot (3,600 m^{2}) facility in downtown Muskegon, Michigan began construction in the spring of 2008. Baker College of Cadillac opened its new Center for Transportation and Technology in 2010. In 2011, the Culinary Institute of Michigan was granted Exemplary Status accreditation through the American Culinary Federation (ACF).

In 2020, Baker relocated its main campus from Flint, Michigan to Owosso, Michigan. In addition, the Clinton Township and Allen Park campuses were closed, with the move to the new, modern campus in downtown Royal Oak.

== Campuses ==
Baker College serves a wide range of students including traditional on-campus students, online students, adult learners, and first generation students. Baker College specializes in Nursing, Health Sciences, Business, and IT/TECH degrees - and offers over 90 degrees and certifications in total. Current campuses include:

- Owosso, Michigan
- Cadillac, Michigan
- Jackson, Michigan
- Muskegon, Michigan
- Royal Oak, Michigan
- Center for Graduate Studies
- Baker College Online
- The Culinary Institute of Michigan
- The Auto/Diesel Institute of Michigan

== Mission and academics ==
Admissions statistics
- 2021 entering class
- Admit rate: 85.6 (447 out of 522)

Test scores middle 50%^{[i]}
- SAT Total: 900-1100 (among 24% of FTFs)
- ACT Composite: 16-22 (among 2% of FTFs)

Baker College has been empowering students for more than a century, driven by a clear mission: to deliver a transformative, student-centered education that opens doors to lifelong academic and professional success. Baker College is one of Michigan's largest private, non-profit colleges.

Founded in 1911, Baker College offers associate, bachelor's, master's, and doctoral degrees across Michigan and online.

Baker College has released its 2026 President's Report, a comprehensive account of institutional progress, innovation, and impact that builds on the national recognition earned by the College's inaugural President's Report and showcases a new chapter of achievement under President Dr. Jacqui Spicer's leadership.

The newly published report reflects the continued momentum of Baker College following the inaugural President's Report, which received national honors from both the Council for Advancement and Support of Education (CASE) and PR Daily. Those accolades established a high standard for transparency, storytelling, and strategic communication. The 2026 report expands upon with a deeper look at measurable outcomes, statewide influence, and future-focused initiatives.

The 2026 President's Report captures a period of significant advancement for Baker College, including more than $3 billion in documented economic impact, national recognition as a Newsweek Top Online College, and selection to the FirstGen Forward Network, affirming the College's commitment to first-generation student success. The report also highlights the College's leadership in AI integration, dual enrollment expansion, tuition freezes, and its designation as both a Military Friendly® Silver School and a Michigan Veteran-Friendly Gold institution.

To support Baker College's growth, Athletics were added in 2026, as well as expanding student resources, campus facilities, access to free learning platforms, and several new degree programs.

== Notable alumni ==
- J. M. Allain, Broadway producer
- Pam Faris, former member of the Michigan House of Representatives
- Alex Garza, member of the Michigan House of Representatives
- Dena Head, women's basketball player
- Michele Hoitenga, member of the Michigan Senate
- Bronna Kahle, former member of the Michigan House of Representatives
- Gena C. Lovett, Vice President of Operations for Boeing Defense, Space & Security
- Jeff Raatz, member of the Indiana Senate
