= Julius Frieseke House =

- U.S. National Register of Historic Places
- Michigan State Historic Site
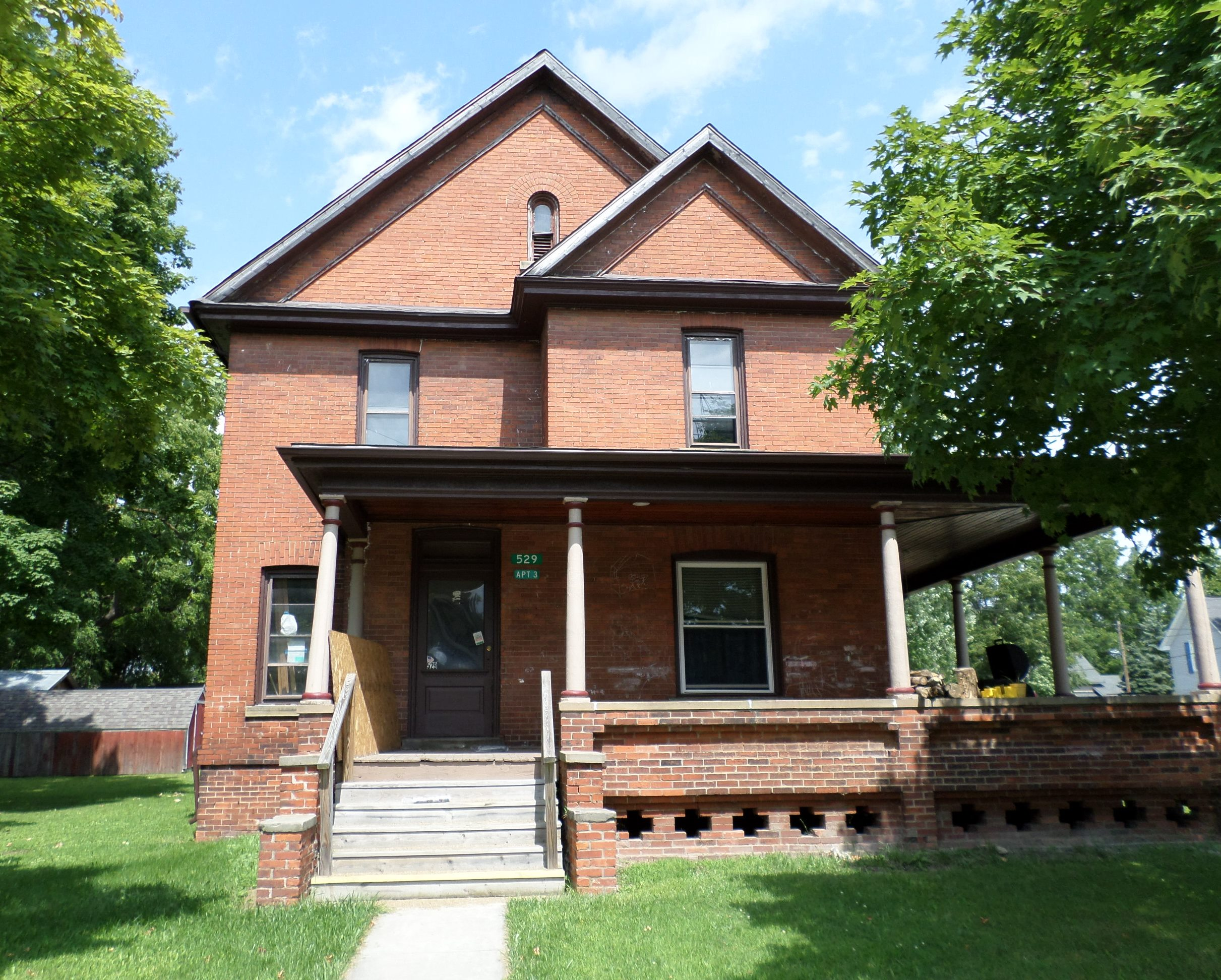
- Interactive map
- Location: 529 Corunna Ave., Owosso, Michigan
- Coordinates: 42°59′30″N 84°09′51″W
- Area: less than one acre
- Built: c. 1897
- Architectural style: Queen Anne
- NRHP reference No.: 90000574
- Added to NRHP: April 5, 1990

The Julius Frieseke House is a single family home located at 529 Corunna Avenue in Owosso, Michigan. It was listed on the National Register of Historic Places in 1990.

== History ==
Julius Frieseke was born in Germany in 1842, and came to Owosso along with his parents and his brother Herman in 1858. Both brothers went to work in the Shattuck brickyard in Owosso, then moved to Ypsilanti, Michigan to work in another brickyard there, and served in the Union army during the Civil War. After the war, they returned to Owosso, and soon purchased the Shattuck brickyard, renaming it the J. & H. Frieseke brickyard. The business started small, but by 1891 employed 25 workers and made two to three million bricks per year.

In about 1897, Julius Frieseke constructed a new brick house, replacing his earlier frame house that still stands nearby. He lived in the house until his death in 1920.

== Description ==
The Julius Frieseke House is a two-and-one-half-story, cross-gable, Queen Anne structure built of dark red brick which was manufactures in the Frieseke brickyard. The exterior has simple detailing. It has a wraparound Tuscan-column veranda in the front. The windows are double-hung, one-over-one-light, sash units set in plain segmental-arch window heads, with rounded head windows in the gables.
