= Elias Comstock Cabin =

- U.S. National Register of Historic Places
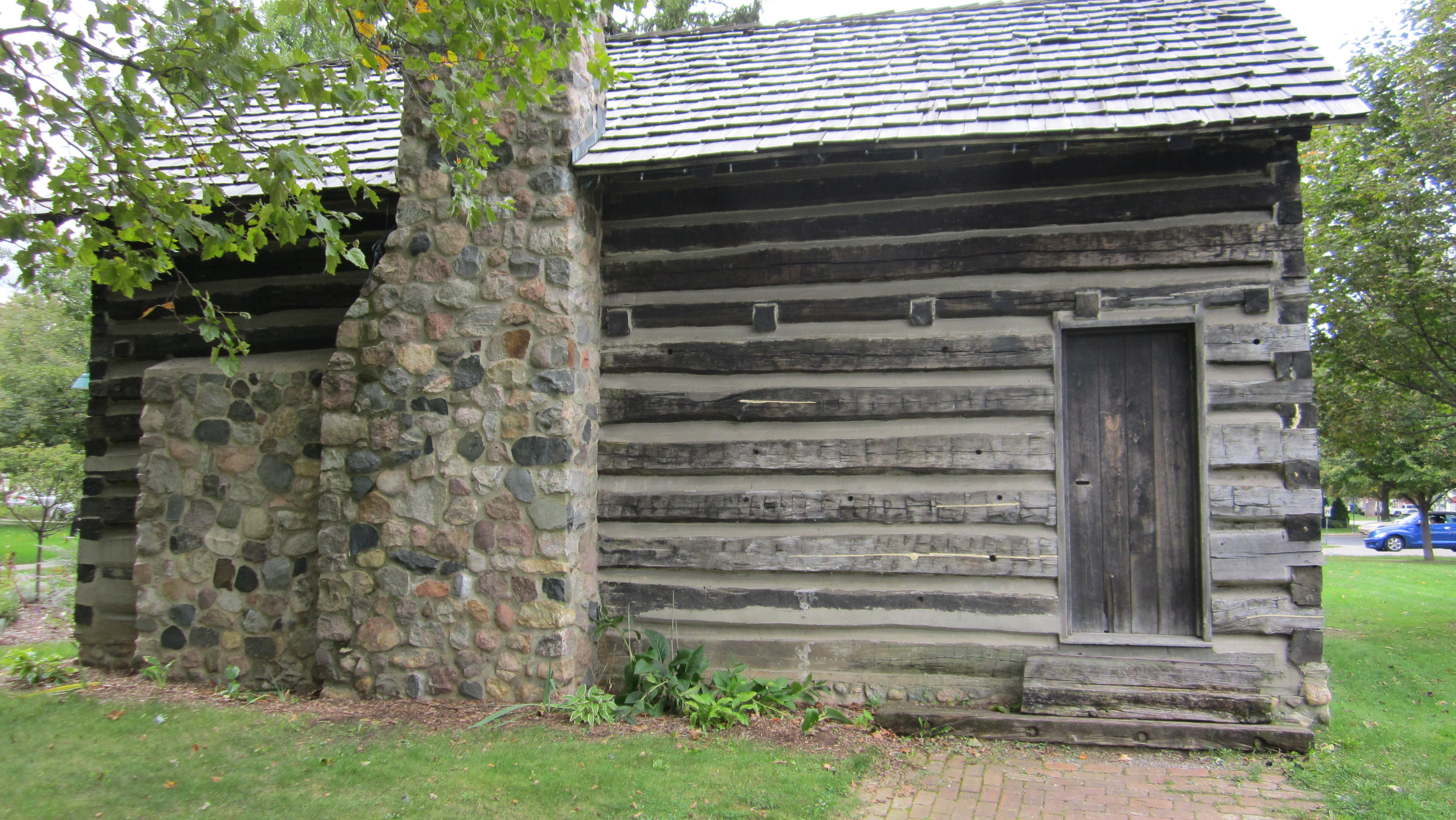
- Interactive map
- Location: Curwood Castle Dr., and John St., Owosso, Michigan
- Coordinates: 42°59′57″N 84°10′32″W
- Area: less than one acre
- Built: 1836
- Built by: Elias Comstock
- MPS: Owosso MRA
- NRHP reference No.: 80001894
- Added to NRHP: November 4, 1980

The Elias Comstock Cabin is a single-family home located at the corner of Curwood Castle Drive and John Street in Owosso, Michigan. It was listed on the National Register of Historic Places in 1980. It is the oldest residence still extant in the City of Owosso.

== History ==
Elias Comstock was born in New London, Connecticut in 1799. In 1824, he moved with his parents to Pontiac, Michigan. In 1827, Comstock married Lucy Lamson. Elias worked as a school teacher at the Detroit Academy in Detroit, then moved onto teach at a rural school in Pontiac before briefly becoming a merchant in Stony Creek, Michigan. The Comstocks moved to the newly established community of Owosso in 1835. There, in 1836 he constructed a home, becoming the city's first real settler. Comstock opened a successful mercantile business, and in 1837 Governor Lewis Cass appointed him the county's Justice of the Peace. He served as the Township's Supervisor between 1838 and 1840, and later served as Judge of Probate, County Judge, and Associate Judge of the Circuit Court.

The Comstocks continued to live in their cabin, but over the years, they added a series of frame additions to the house, as well as a long front porch. Eventually the cabin became the living room of the home, and was entirely covered by a frame exterior. Elias Comstock died in 1886, and Lucy Comstock died in 1890. The Comstock house passed on to the Leitch family, then the Corey family.

In 1920, the Standard Oil Company purchased the Comstock property and began demolition of the house. They discovered the original log cabin, mostly intact, hidden within the frame house. The Shiawassee County chapter of the Daughters of the American Revolution led efforts to preserve the cabin, and moved it to the rear of the lot and preserved as a museum. The cabin was later moved to Bentley Park, and in 1969 was moved again to its current site. The cabin remains a museum and is open for select events

== Description ==
The Comstock cabin is a one-room log cabin, measuring twenty by thirty feet. It has hand-finished door and window frames and a puncheon floor. The structure has been carefully restored by the city.
