= Rush Township, Michigan =

- Civil township
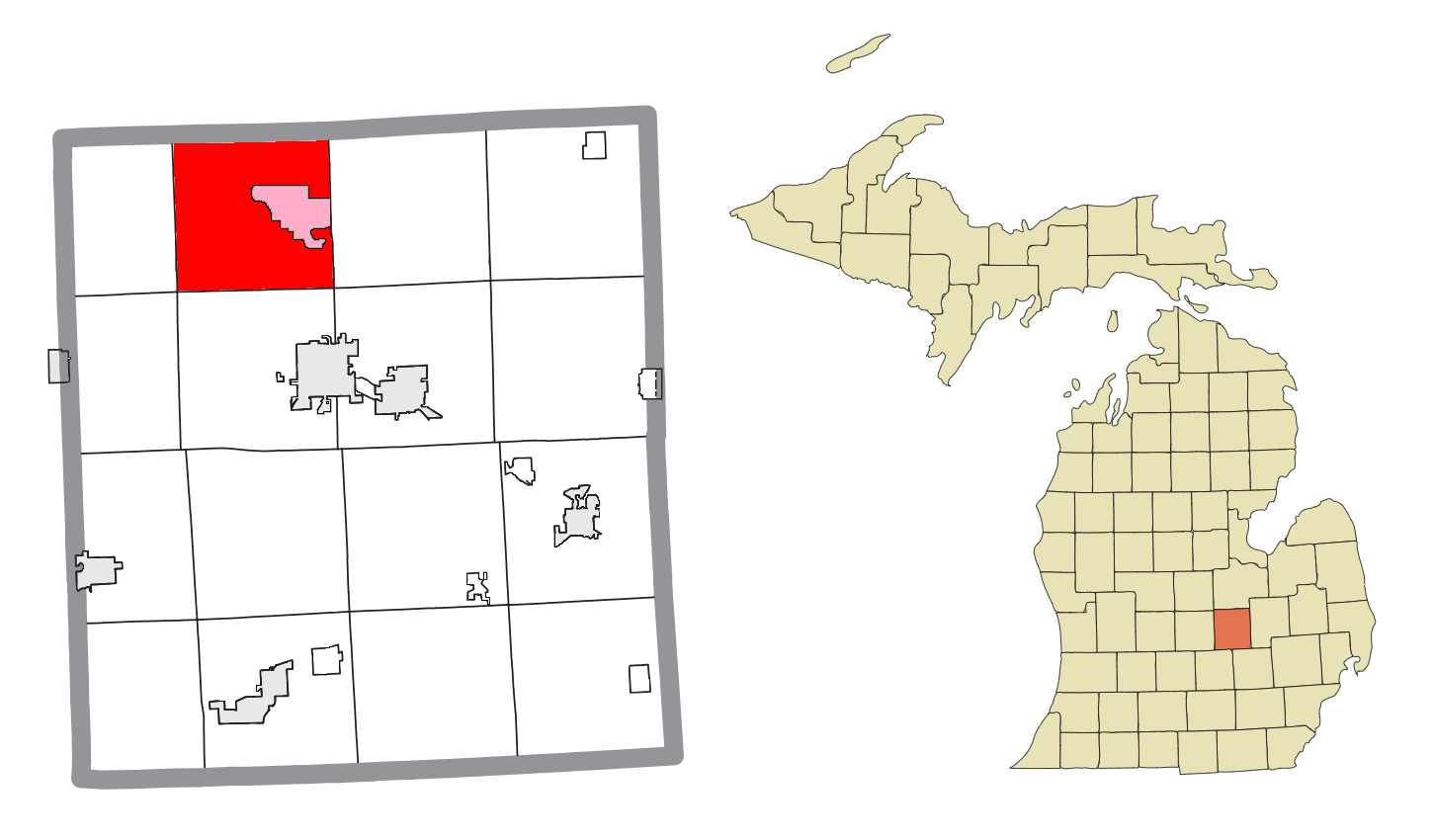
- Location within Shiawassee County (red) and the administered community of Henderson (pink)

- Location within the state of Michigan Rush Township (the United States)
- Coordinates: 43°04′46″N 84°13′14″W
- Country: United States
- State: Michigan
- County: Shiawassee

Government
  - Supervisor: Brian Santrucek
  - Clerk: Linda Grigsby

Area
  - Total: 35.24 sq mi (91.3 km^{2})
  - Land: 34.90 sq mi (90.4 km^{2})
  - Water: 0.34 sq mi (0.88 km^{2})
- Elevation: 732 ft (223 m)

Population (2020)
  - Total: 1,268
  - Density: 36.33/sq mi (14.03/km^{2})
- Time zone: UTC-5 (Eastern (EST))
  - Summer (DST): UTC-4 (EDT)
- ZIP code(s): 48649 (Oakley); 48831 (Elsie); 48841 (Henderson); 48867 (Owosso)
- Area code: 989
- FIPS code: 26-70260
- GNIS ID: 1627016

Rush Township is a civil township of Shiawassee County in the U.S. state of Michigan. The population was 1,268 at the 2020 census.

== Communities ==
- Five Points North is an unincorporated community in this township and New Haven Township on North M-52 at Riley Road and Seymour Road.43°04′25″N 84°10′03″W
- Henderson, formerly Hendersonville, is a census-designated place and unincorporated community located within the township at 43°05′11″N 84°11′43″W.

== Geography ==
According to the United States Census Bureau, the township has a total area of 35.24 square miles (91.27 km^{2}), of which 34.90 square miles (90.39 km^{2}) is land and 0.34 square miles (0.88 km^{2}) (0.96%) is water.

== Demographics ==
As of the 2000 United States census, there were 1,409 people, 505 households, and 413 families residing in the township. The population density was 40.0 inhabitants per square mile (15.4/km^{2}). There were 541 housing units at an average density of 15.4 per square mile (5.9/km^{2}). The racial makeup of the township was 98.58% White, 0.07% African American, 0.35% Native American, 0.28% from other races, and 0.71% from two or more races. Hispanic or Latino of any race were 1.21% of the population.

There were 505 households, out of which 34.9% had children under the age of 18 living with them, 70.3% were married couples living together, 7.5% had a female householder with no husband present, and 18.2% were non-families. 15.2% of all households were made up of individuals, and 8.7% had someone living alone who was 65 years of age or older. The average household size was 2.79 and the average family size was 3.08.

In the township the population was spread out, with 26.3% under the age of 18, 6.7% from 18 to 24, 27.2% from 25 to 44, 25.8% from 45 to 64, and 14.1% who were 65 years of age or older. The median age was 39 years. For every 100 females, there were 98.2 males. For every 100 females age 18 and over, there were 93.1 males.

The median income for a household in the township was $47,232, and the median income for a family was $51,731. Males had a median income of $35,815 versus $22,400 for females. The per capita income for the township was $20,053. About 3.0% of families and 3.7% of the population were below the poverty line, including 4.4% of those under age 18 and 7.3% of those age 65 or over.

== Highways ==
- M-52
