= J. M. Allain =

American producer

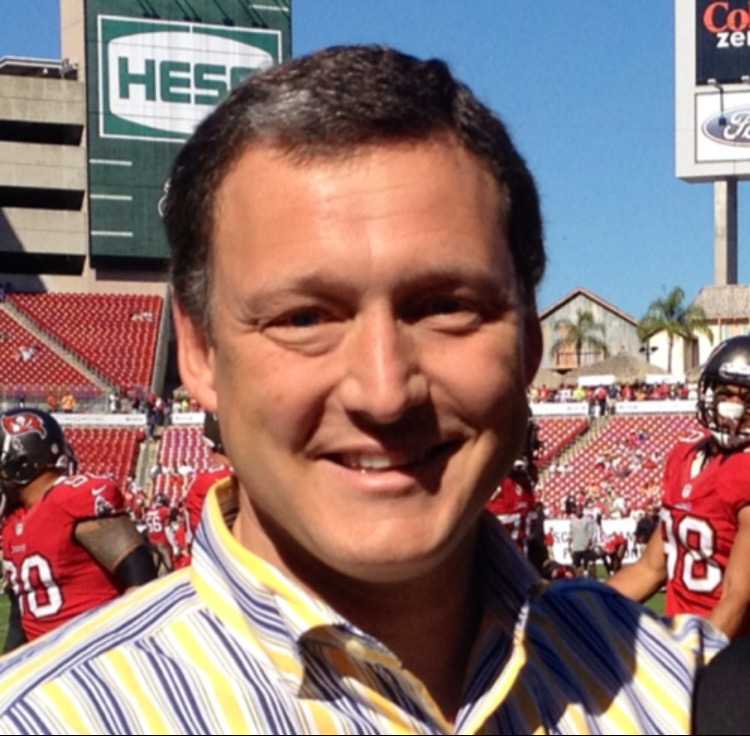
- Born: Jean-Marc L. Allain; February 11, 1970 (age 56); Bouctouche, New Brunswick
- Education: Rochester Institute of Technology, Baker College
- Occupations: Executive, producer
- Spouse: Chantal Allain (1994 - 2013)

Jean-Marc L. Allain also known as J. M. Allain, (born February 11, 1970) is an American and Canadian Tony Award-nominated company executive and Broadway producer. A former division head at Panasonic, he is currently a consultant of JA Pro Services. Previous roles include director at Alcatel and president and CEO of Trans-Lux Corporation.

== Broadway ==
Allain was nominated for a Tony Award in 2013 as the producer for Nice Work If You Can Get It.

He is currently producing 39 Steps, the two-time Tony Award-winning hit comedy at Union Square Theatre in New York, New York.

== Philanthropy ==
Allain donated $1 million in 2012 to his alma mater The Rochester Institute of Technology to help build the Gene Polisseni Center, the university's new hockey arena.
