= Gena C. Lovett =

American business executive

Gena Lovett was the current Vice President of Operations for Boeing Defense, Space & Security.

== Early life and education ==
Gena Lovett was born in Cleveland, Ohio. Her father made dentures and her mother worked at a Ford Motor Company engine plant. She attended Captain Arthur Roth Elementary, Patrick Henry Middle School, and Shaw High School. She credits much of her early educational success to guidance and support by her parents and school guidance counselors.

Lovett attended Ohio State University for her undergraduate degree. Initially, she pursued chemical engineering, but later switched to pre-law studies, graduating in 1986. She then completed an MBA at Baker College in Michigan in 2001. She has a doctoral degree in Values Driven Leadership from Benedictine University.

== Career ==
Lovett has focused on manufacturing operations for the majority of her career. In 1992, she began her career as a plant manager for Ford in Avon Lake, Ohio, where she was the only female supervisor. She remained with Ford until 2007, when she moved to Alcoa. There, she served as the Director of Manufacturing for their Cleveland manufacturing campus. She was the first female and first person of color to hold this title since 1917. She was appointed Alcoa's Chief Diversity Officer from 2012-2015. Under her leadership, Alcoa won the 2013 Catalyst Award and the Human Rights Campaign’s 2014 Corporate Equality Award.

In 2015, she joined Boeing Defense, Space & Security as the Vice President of Operations. She was responsible for standardization, safety, production efficiency for military aircraft and land vehicles, rotorcraft, satellites, and weapons. She was listed in 50 Black Women Over 50.

Lovett serves as an advisor or Board of Director for Trex.

== Personal life ==
Lovett's other interests include creative writing, French, and making stained glass.
