= Owosso High School =

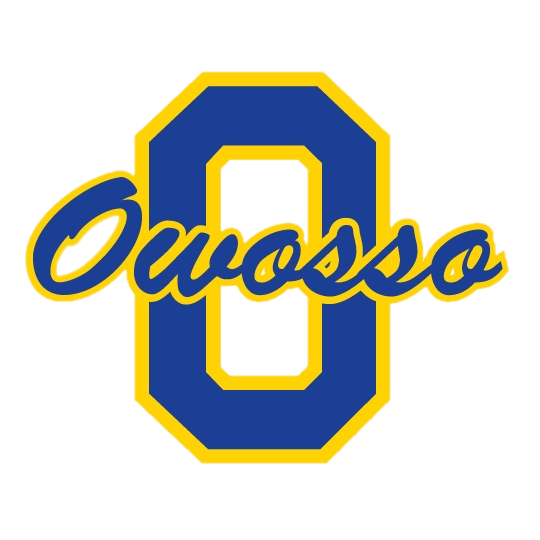

Location
- 765 E. North Street; Owosso, Michigan 48867; United States; 43°00′50.7″N 84°09′39.1″W

Information
- Type: Public high school
- School district: Owosso Public Schools
- Superintendent: Steve Brooks
- Principal: Dallas Lintner
- Teaching staff: 46.31 (FTE)
- Grades: 9–12
- Enrollment: 805 (2024–2025)
- Student to teacher ratio: 17.38
- Campus type: Rural
- Colors: Blue and yellow
- Athletics: MHSAA Class A
- Athletics conference: Flint Metro League
- Nickname: Trojans
- Rival: Corunna High School
- Yearbook: Spic
- Website: ohs.owosso.k12.mi.us

Owosso High School (OHS) is a public high school in Owosso, Michigan. It is the sole high school in the Owosso Public Schools district.

== Demographics ==
The demographic breakdown for the 894 students enrolled in 2018-18 was:

- Male - 49.1%
- Female - 50.9%
- Asian - 0.9%
- Hispanic - 3.0%
- White - 93.2%
- Multiracial - 2.9%

== Notable alumni ==
- Thomas E. Dewey, Governor of New York and candidate for President of the United States in 1944 and 1948
- Jerry Hultin, United States Under Secretary of the Navy and university administrator
- Brad Van Pelt, NFL player and member of the College Football Hall of Fame
