= John Wesley College (Michigan) =

Michigan college

John Wesley College was a former college in Owosso, Michigan. The college was established in 1949 as Owosso Bible College.

== History ==
In 1958, it was reorganized from a Bible college to a Christian liberal arts college and renamed it Owosso College. About this same time it merged with Eastern Pilgrim College. In 1972, Kenneth Armstrong became the president of the college and renamed it John Wesley College.

In 1974, the school received regional accreditation for the first time. However, the later went into bankruptcy and closed in 1981. Several years later the campus was acquired by Baker College.
