= West Town Historic Commercial and Industrial District =

Historic place in Michigan, United States

- U.S. National Register of Historic Places
- U.S. Historic district
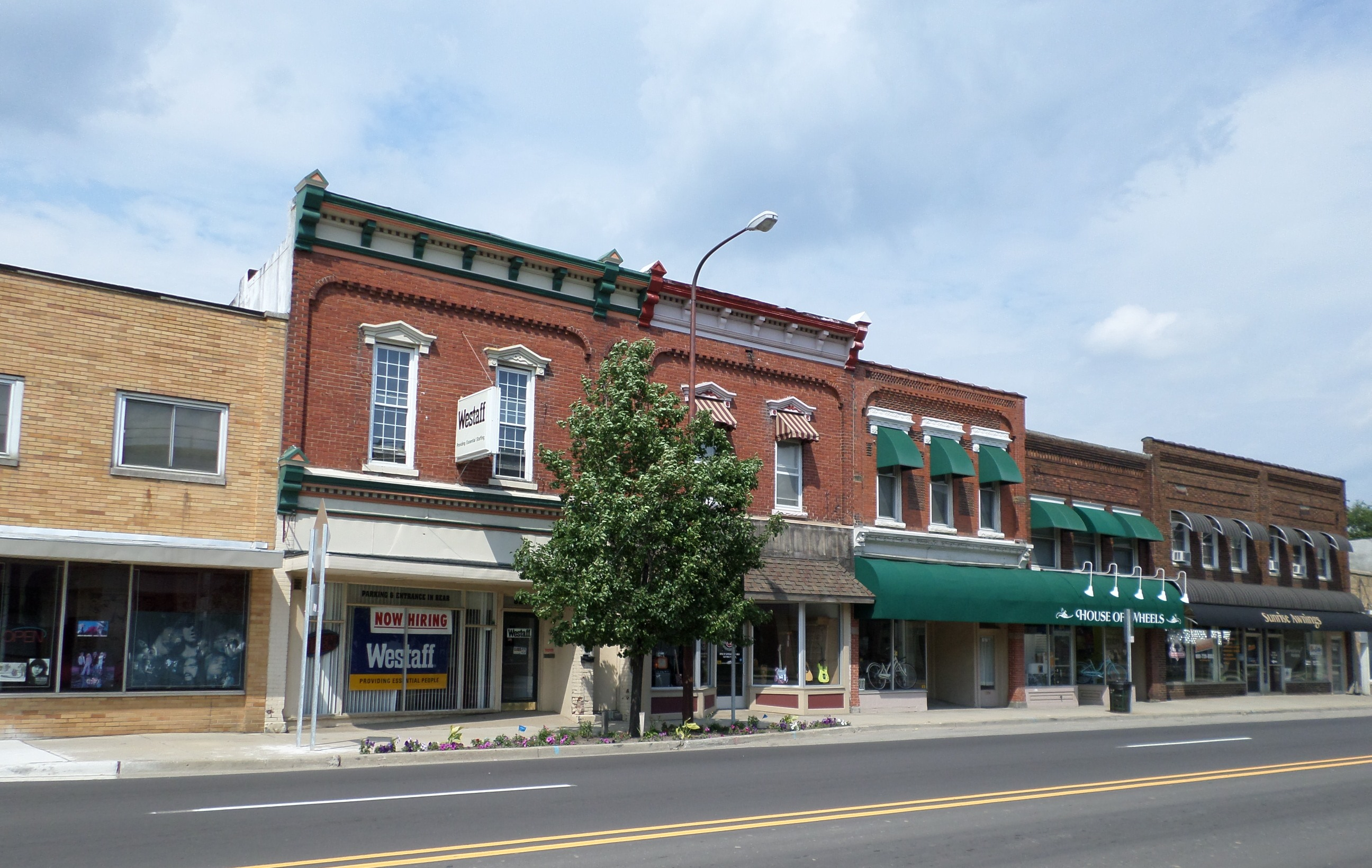
- Interactive map
- Location: Main St., Owosso, Michigan
- Coordinates: 42°59′55″N 84°11′2″W
- Area: 13 acres (5.3 ha)
- Architectural style: Italianate, Romanesque
- MPS: Owosso MRA
- NRHP reference No.: 80001911
- Added to NRHP: November 4, 1980

The West Town Historic Commercial and Industrial District is a combination commercial and industrial historic district located along Main Street between Cedar and State in Owosso, Michigan. It was listed on the National Register of Historic Places in 1980.

== History ==
When Owosso was established, most of the growth occurred in an area around the Shiawassee River. However, in 1856, the Detroit and Milwaukee Railway arrived in the city, followed by two more lines by 1867. By the 1880s, a fourth line was added, and the southwest part of Owosso became a busy hub of railway infrastructure. Manufacturers soon realized that locating near the lines would reduce transportation costs, and their workers established neighborhoods near the new factories. To serve these new neighborhoods, a small commercial district sprang up on Main Street.

== Description ==
The West Town Historic District is a commercial and industrial area, containing 35 buildings. Thirteen of these date from between 1856 and 1890, and fifteen more date from the turn of the century to the Great Depression. Of the remainder, all but two fit the scale and architectural feel of the district. The commercial portion of the district along Main Street is primarily two-story brick store buildings, ornamented with cast iron, tin, stone, and tile details. Earlier buildings are mostly Italianate in design. Later buildings are more streamlined in design. The industrial section of the district, located near the railroad tracks to the north of Main Street, has been substantially demolished.
