= Henderson, Michigan =

- Census-designated place (CDP) & unincorporated community
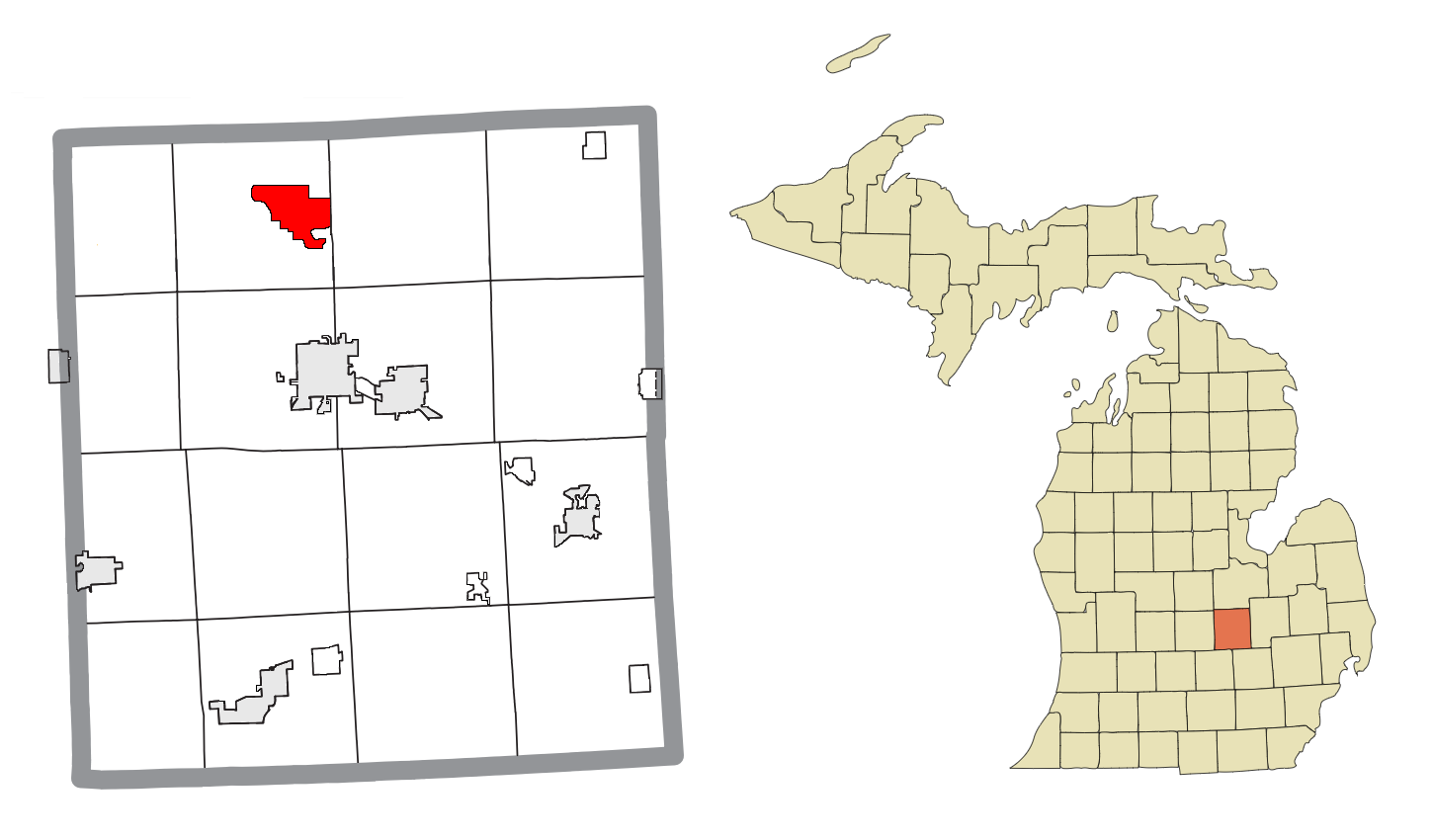
- Location within Shiawassee County

- Location within the state of Michigan Henderson (the United States)
- Coordinates: 43°05′14″N 84°11′36″W
- Country: United States
- State: Michigan
- County: Shiawassee
- Township: Rush

Area
  - Total: 3.66 sq mi (9.49 km^{2})
  - Land: 3.60 sq mi (9.32 km^{2})
  - Water: 0.066 sq mi (0.17 km^{2})
- Elevation: 732 ft (223 m)

Population (2020)
  - Total: 413
  - Density: 115/sq mi (44.3/km^{2})
- Time zone: UTC-5 (Eastern (EST))
  - Summer (DST): UTC-4 (EDT)
- ZIP code(s): 48841
- Area code: 989
- GNIS feature ID: 2628666

Henderson is an unincorporated community and census-designated place (CDP) in Shiawassee County in the U.S. state of Michigan. As of the 2020 census, Henderson had a population of 413. The community is located within Rush Township. Henderson was named for early settler John Henderson, and the community was formerly referred to as Hendersonville and Hazel Green.

== History ==
In 1836, Gideon Lee of New York City was first to enter the land here. Lee sold the land to Josiah Isham. Isham sold the land in 1858 to Andrew Henderson. In 1868, Andrew's son and community's name sake, John, built the first store in 1868 followed by the first hotel in 1875. The community became known as Hendersonville.

On May 14, 1868, the Hazel Green post office was opened here under postmaster William Cook. The Michigan Central Railroad station was called Henderson. The post office was renamed on October 16, 1876 to Henderson. For Andrew Henderson, Ezra Mason platted the village in 1879.

The community of Henderson was listed as a newly-organized census-designated place for the 2010 census, meaning it now has officially defined boundaries and population statistics for the first time.

== Geography ==
According to the U.S. Census Bureau, the community has an area of 3.67 square miles (9.51 km^{2}), of which 3.60 square miles (9.32 km^{2}) is land and 0.07 square miles (0.18 km^{2}) (1.91%) is water.

The Shiawassee River passes through the community, and M-52 forms part of the eastern border with New Haven Township.

== Demographics ==
Historical population
Census	Pop.	Note	%±
2010	399		—
2020	413		3.5%
U.S. Decennial Census

== Highways ==
- M-52
