= Lincoln School (Owosso, Michigan) =

- U.S. National Register of Historic Places
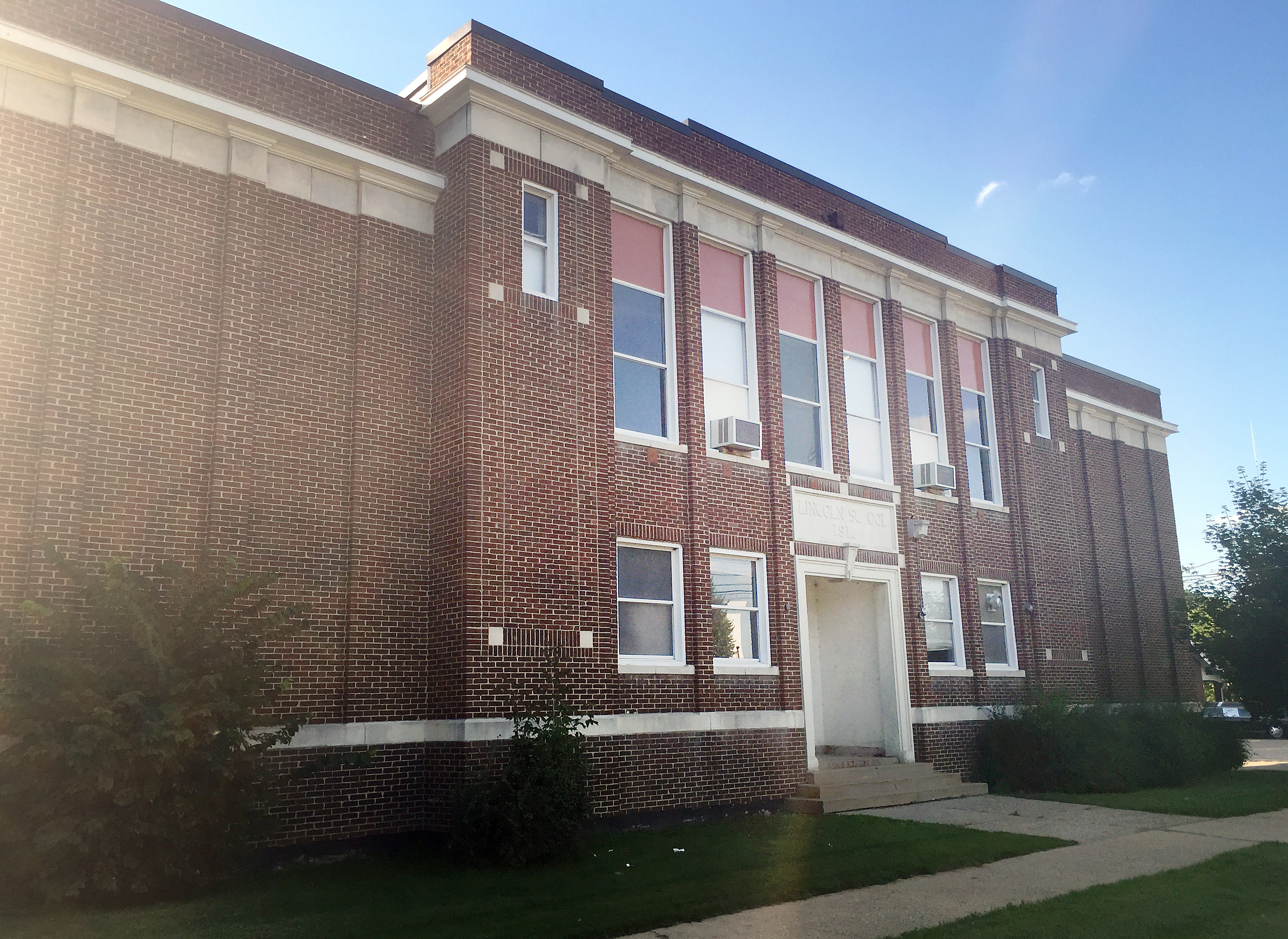

- Location within Michigan
- Interactive map
- Location: 120 Michigan Ave. Owosso, Michigan
- Coordinates: 42°59′50″N 84°10′29″W
- Built: 1915
- Built by: Rickman Sons Company
- Architect: Samuel Dana Butterworth
- Architectural style: Classical Revival
- NRHP reference No.: 16000510
- Added to NRHP: August 8, 2016

The Lincoln School was built in 1915 in the Classical Revival style. The school was added to the National Register of Historic Places in August 2016. The building now houses the Lincoln House Apartments.

== History ==
The Owosso community was served by a single Union School until the late 1890s. However, by 1915 there were a record number of students in the system, and the school board began exploring the construction of an additional building. The board purchased a location for a new school, and selected Samuel Dana Butterworth of Lansing, Michigan as the architect. The Rickman Sons Company, of Kalamazoo, Michigan was awarded the contract for construction. The completed building opened at the beginning of January 1916.

The schools of Owosso continued to grow, and Lincoln School served as an elementary school until the fall of 1980. From that point until 2004, Lincoln School was used as a storage facility, and as the headquarters for the Maintenance Department of the Owosso Public Schools. In 2005, the building was converted to house Lincoln Alternative Education High School, which used the building until 2011. The building remained vacant until 2016. It was converted into apartments, which opened in 2018.

== Description ==
The Lincoln School building is a two-story Classical Revival red brick structure measuring approximately 115 feet by 225 feet. The main elevation contains a six bay projecting central section, with each bay flanked by brick pilasters. Each bay contains double-hung windows on both stories. A central pair of doors has a cast stone trim surround, above which is a stone plaque containing "LINCOLN SCHOOL / 1915." To each side of the central portion are three-bay side wings without windows.
