= Shiawassee District Library =

Coordinates: 42°59′52.7″N 84°10′37.8″W

- Shiawassee District Library, Owosso Branch
- Location: 502 West Main Street, Owosso, Michigan
- Established: 1994

Other information
- Director: Kimberly White
- Website: www.mysdl.org

The Shiawassee District Library in Owosso, Michigan is a public library system that serves the residents of the cities of Durand, Michigan and Bennington, Owosso, and Rush Townships. The library system was created in 1994 after the Owosso Public Library and the Durand Memorial Library combined resources. In July 2000, the Bill & Melinda Gates Foundation committed a $35,722 grant to the library.

The Owosso branch is a Carnegie library located at 502 West Main Street. It was built with a $20,000 grant from Andrew Carnegie on land donated by the heirs of L.E. Woodard. The groundbreaking ceremonies in October 1913 included a parade through the city. The library was dedicated on July 4, 1914. In 1926, the Owosso-born Impressionist painter Frederick Carl Frieseke gave the city of Owosso his painting, Lady With the Sunshade, which originally hung in the library but is now on display at the Shiawassee Arts Council building. Today, the library offers children and adult collections, computer training, and community programs. The library was the 2022 award recipient of the Library of Michigan Public Library Services Grant Program.
