= New Haven Township, Shiawassee County, Michigan =

New Haven Township, Michigan
- Civil township
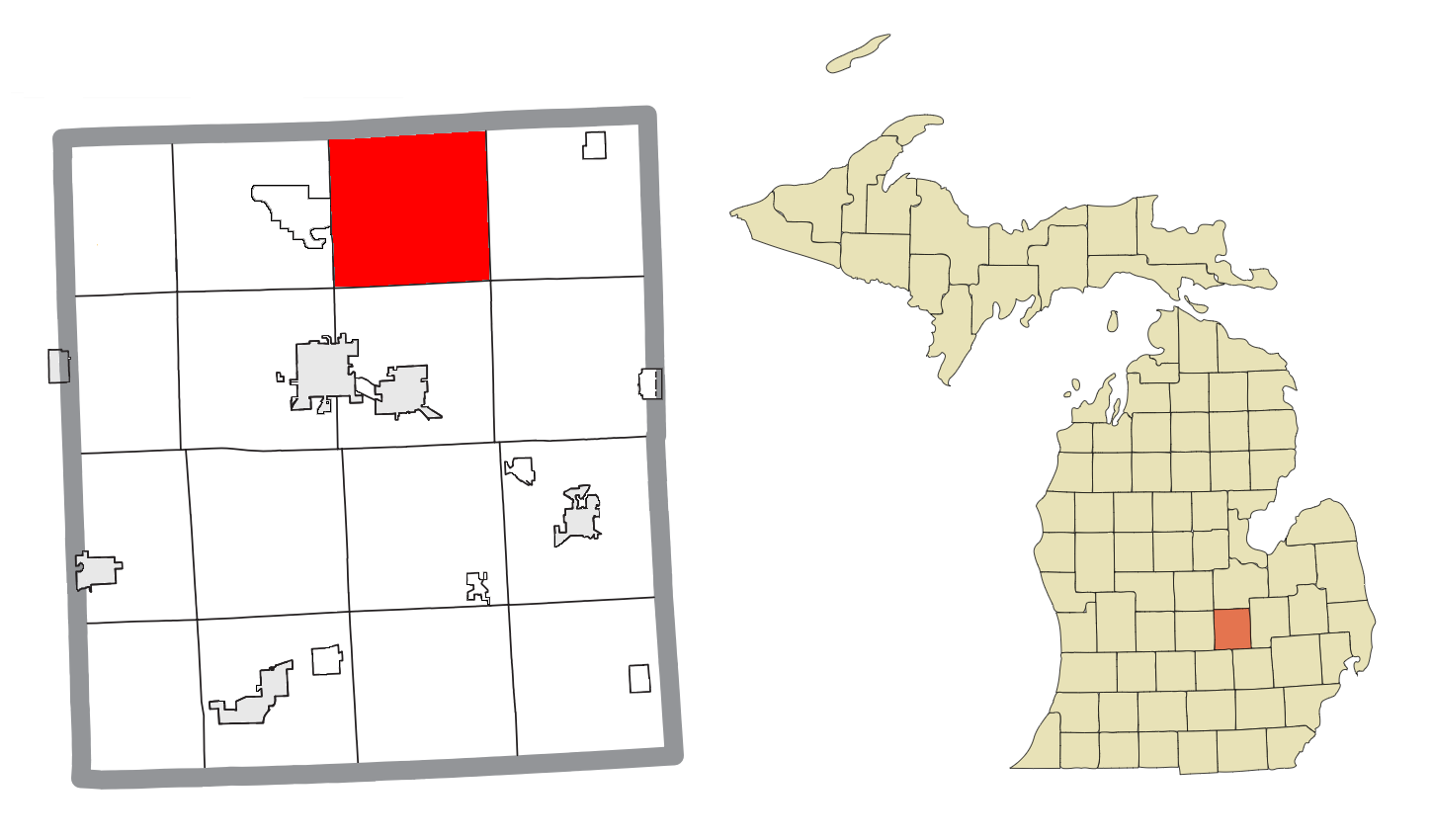
- Location within Shiawassee County

- Location within the state of Michigan New Haven Township (the United States)
- Coordinates: 43°05′25″N 84°07′08″W
- Country: United States
- State: Michigan
- County: Shiawassee
- Established: 1848

Government
  - Supervisor: Timothy Hill
  - Clerk: Heather Wirwicki

Area
  - Total: 35.74 sq mi (92.6 km^{2})
  - Land: 35.59 sq mi (92.2 km^{2})
  - Water: 0.15 sq mi (0.39 km^{2})
- Elevation: 738 ft (225 m)

Population (2020)
  - Total: 1,218
  - Density: 34.22/sq mi (13.21/km^{2})
- Time zone: UTC-5 (Eastern (EST))
  - Summer (DST): UTC-4 (EDT)
- ZIP code(s): 48460 (New Lothrop); 48616 (Chesaning); 48817 (Corunna); 48841 (Henderson); 48867 (Owosso)
- Area code: 989
- FIPS code: 26-57400
- GNIS feature ID: 1626802
- Website: Official website

New Haven Township is a civil township of Shiawassee County in the U.S. state of Michigan. The population was 1,218 at the 2020 census. The township was organized in 1848.

== Communities ==
- Easton is an unincorporated community in the township at Easton and Cram roads.43°06′50″N 84°05′18″W. The community was named for Robert Easton. A post office was established at Easton in 1887, and remained in operation until 1903.
- New Haven is an unincorporated community in this township at North Seymour and East 6 Mile Creek roads.43°05′37″N 84°09′12″W The state map places it at North M-52 and East Henderson Road.

== Geography ==
According to the United States Census Bureau, the city has a total area of 35.74 square miles (92.57 km^{2}), of which 35.59 square miles (92.18 km^{2}) is land and 0.15 square miles (0.39 km^{2}) (0.42%) is water.

== Demographics ==
As of the census of 2000, there were 1,293 people, 484 households, and 387 families residing in the township. The population density was 36.2 inhabitants per square mile (14.0/km^{2}). There were 507 housing units at an average density of 14.2 per square mile (5.5/km^{2}). The racial makeup of the township was 97.99% White, 0.08% Native American, 0.54% from other races, and 1.39% from two or more races. Hispanic or Latino of any race were 1.31% of the population.

There were 484 households, out of which 34.1% had children under the age of 18 living with them, 72.1% were married couples living together, 5.0% had a female householder with no husband present, and 20.0% were non-families. 16.5% of all households were made up of individuals, and 7.9% had someone living alone who was 65 years of age or older. The average household size was 2.67 and the average family size was 3.01.

In the township the population was spread out, with 24.6% under the age of 18, 6.9% from 18 to 24, 28.9% from 25 to 44, 26.5% from 45 to 64, and 13.1% who were 65 years of age or older. The median age was 40 years. For every 100 females, there were 102.7 males. For every 100 females age 18 and over, there were 104.8 males.

The median income for a household in the township was $46,420, and the median income for a family was $55,625. Males had a median income of $37,135 versus $23,816 for females. The per capita income for the township was $21,757. About 0.8% of families and 2.9% of the population were below the poverty line, including 4.9% of those under age 18 and 4.1% of those age 65 or over.

== Highways ==
- M-52
