= Owosso, Michigan =

- City
- City of Owosso
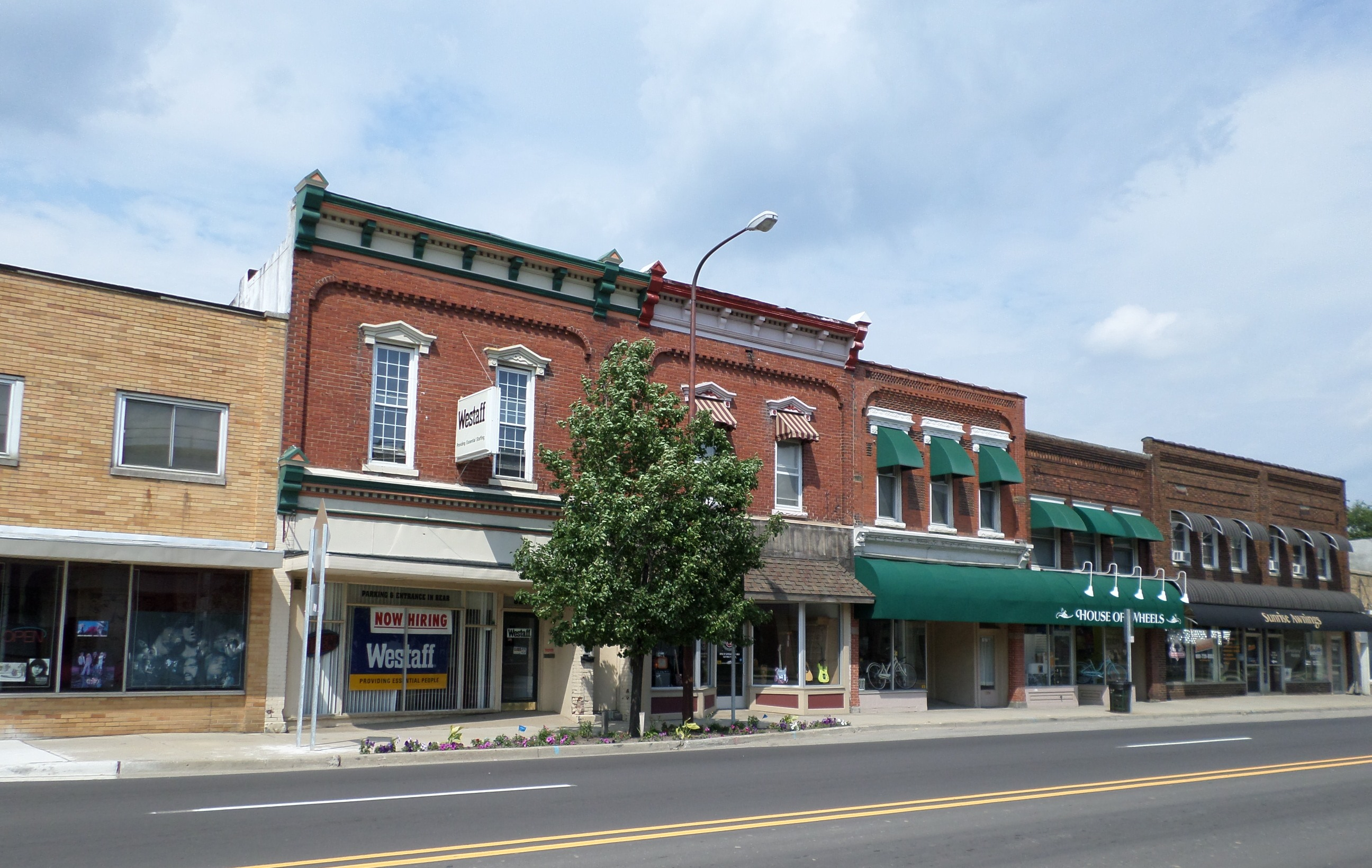
- West Town Historic Commercial and Industrial District along Main Street (M-21)

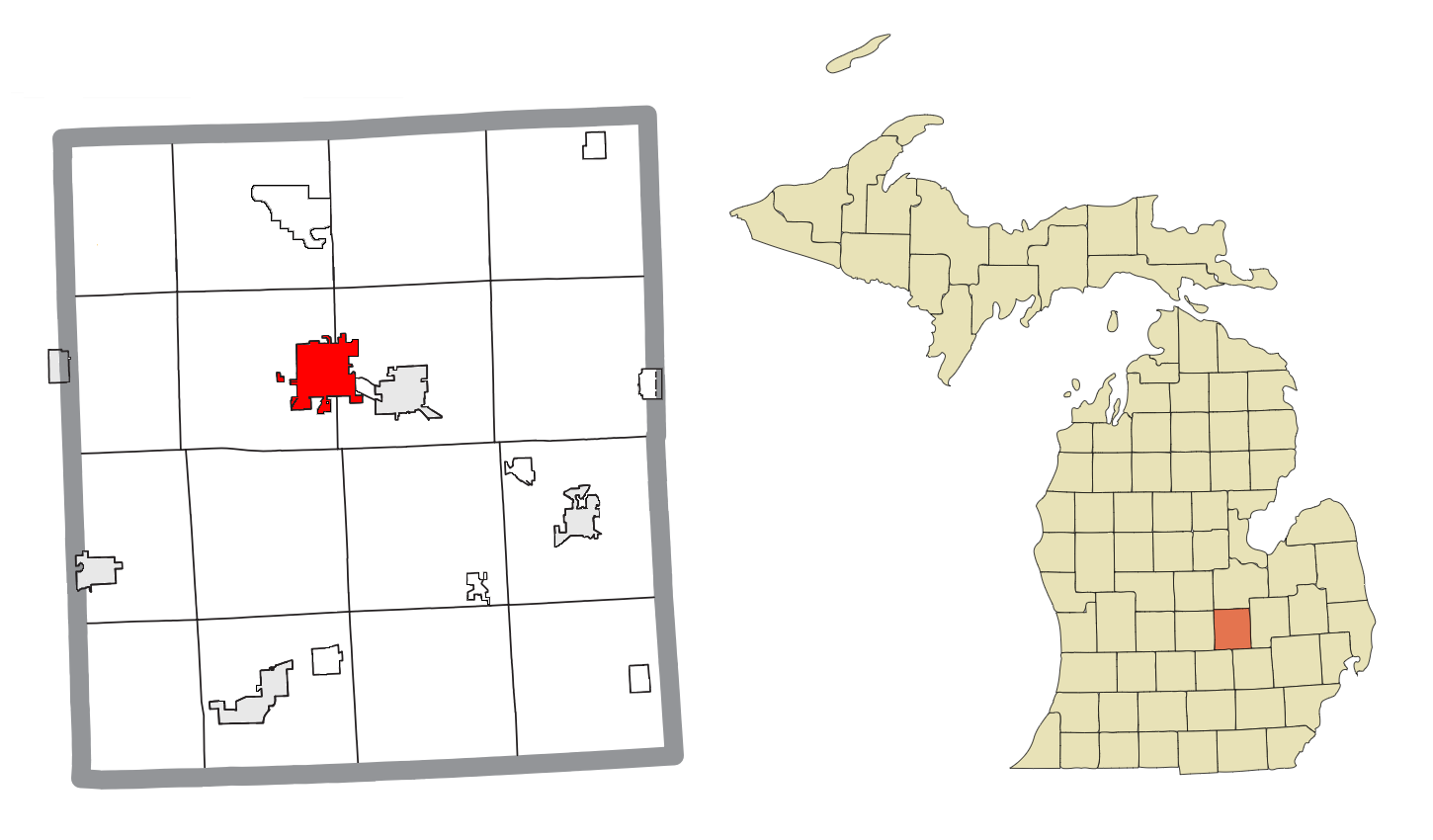
- Location within Shiawassee County

- Location within the state of Michigan
- Coordinates: 42°59′44″N 84°10′33″W
- Country: United States
- State: Michigan
- County: Shiawassee
- Incorporated: 1859

Government
  - Type: Council–manager
  - Mayor: Robert J. Teich, Jr.
  - Manager: Nathan Henne

Area
  - Total: 5.39 sq mi (13.96 km^{2})
  - Land: 5.25 sq mi (13.59 km^{2})
  - Water: 0.14 sq mi (0.37 km^{2})
- Elevation: 738 ft (225 m)

Population (2020)
  - Total: 14,714
  - Density: 2,803.6/sq mi (1,082.47/km^{2})
- Time zone: UTC-5 (Eastern (EST))
  - Summer (DST): UTC-4 (EDT)
- ZIP code(s): 48867
- Area code: 989
- FIPS code: 26-61940
- GNIS feature ID: 1626875
- Website: ci.owosso.mi.us

Owosso (/oʊˈɒsoʊ/ oh-OS-oh) is the largest city in Shiawassee County in the U.S. state of Michigan. The population was 14,714 at the 2020 census. It is located 29 miles (46.7 km) west of Flint, and 32 miles (51.5 km) northeast of Lansing. The city is mostly surrounded by Owosso Township on its west, but the two are administered autonomously. The city was named after Chief Wosso, an Ojibwe leader of the Shiawassee area.

== History ==
=== 19th century ===
Alfred L. and Benjamin O. Williams were early European-American settlers in the area. They were joined by Elias Comstock, who built the first permanent home in the settlement. Dr. John B. Barnes, a physician and a judge, and Sophronia King Barnes moved to Owosso in 1842. They lived on Oliver and Water streets where they operated an Underground Railroad waystation, where they provided aid and shelter for enslaved African Americans.

Owosso was incorporated as a city in 1859, at which time it had 1,000 people. The city's first mayor was Amos Gould, a judge originally from New York. Many other settlers also migrated across the Northern Tier from New York and New England. In 1876, the city organized its fire department.

=== 20th century ===
The pattern of settlement and migration resulted in a majority-white city. In the 1950s, Owosso was reported by a major Montgomery, Alabama, newspaper to be a sundown town, where African Americans were not allowed to live or stay overnight.

== Geography ==
The city is on the Shiawassee River.

According to the United States Census Bureau, the city has a total area of 5.39 square miles (13.96 km^{2}), of which 5.25 square miles (13.60 km^{2}) is land and 0.14 square miles (0.36 km^{2}) (2.60%) is water.

=== Climate ===
Owosso experiences frigid winters, with the last snow usually falling in April, typically Northern Midwestern spring thaws, balmy to hot summers, and colorful falls, with the first snows usually occurring sometimes in December but typically in January. Each year Owosso averages eleven days with temperatures below 0 °F (−18 °C), and nine days with temperatures above 90 °F (32 °C). Owosso averages twenty-nine inches of rain per year, and forty-one inches of snow. The average growing season in Owosso is 144 days.

Climate data for Owosso WWTP, Michigan (1991–2020 normals, extremes 1896–present)
| Month | Jan | Feb | Mar | Apr | May | Jun | Jul | Aug | Sep | Oct | Nov | Dec | Year |
|---|---|---|---|---|---|---|---|---|---|---|---|---|---|
| Record high °F (°C) | 65 (18) | 74 (23) | 87 (31) | 88 (31) | 95 (35) | 102 (39) | 105 (41) | 103 (39) | 103 (39) | 90 (32) | 79 (26) | 69 (21) | 105 (41) |
| Mean maximum °F (°C) | 52.2 (11.2) | 52.6 (11.4) | 67.2 (19.6) | 78.3 (25.7) | 85.6 (29.8) | 90.8 (32.7) | 91.5 (33.1) | 90.8 (32.7) | 88.3 (31.3) | 79.6 (26.4) | 66.4 (19.1) | 54.7 (12.6) | 93.3 (34.1) |
| Mean daily maximum °F (°C) | 30.3 (−0.9) | 33.1 (0.6) | 43.3 (6.3) | 56.5 (13.6) | 68.7 (20.4) | 78.1 (25.6) | 81.9 (27.7) | 80.0 (26.7) | 73.5 (23.1) | 60.6 (15.9) | 47.0 (8.3) | 35.5 (1.9) | 57.4 (14.1) |
| Daily mean °F (°C) | 23.0 (−5.0) | 24.7 (−4.1) | 33.6 (0.9) | 45.5 (7.5) | 57.4 (14.1) | 67.0 (19.4) | 70.8 (21.6) | 69.3 (20.7) | 62.3 (16.8) | 50.3 (10.2) | 38.8 (3.8) | 29.0 (−1.7) | 47.6 (8.7) |
| Mean daily minimum °F (°C) | 15.7 (−9.1) | 16.3 (−8.7) | 23.8 (−4.6) | 34.5 (1.4) | 46.2 (7.9) | 56.0 (13.3) | 59.7 (15.4) | 58.5 (14.7) | 51.0 (10.6) | 40.0 (4.4) | 30.7 (−0.7) | 22.5 (−5.3) | 37.9 (3.3) |
| Mean minimum °F (°C) | −3.5 (−19.7) | −2.0 (−18.9) | 6.2 (−14.3) | 22.5 (−5.3) | 32.1 (0.1) | 42.1 (5.6) | 48.9 (9.4) | 47.4 (8.6) | 37.6 (3.1) | 27.3 (−2.6) | 17.4 (−8.1) | 5.9 (−14.5) | −7.4 (−21.9) |
| Record low °F (°C) | −22 (−30) | −26 (−32) | −15 (−26) | 3 (−16) | 20 (−7) | 31 (−1) | 40 (4) | 34 (1) | 26 (−3) | 15 (−9) | −5 (−21) | −14 (−26) | −26 (−32) |
| Average precipitation inches (mm) | 2.10 (53) | 1.82 (46) | 1.98 (50) | 3.62 (92) | 4.15 (105) | 3.50 (89) | 3.55 (90) | 3.33 (85) | 2.75 (70) | 3.23 (82) | 2.41 (61) | 2.03 (52) | 34.47 (876) |
| Average snowfall inches (cm) | 12.4 (31) | 8.9 (23) | 4.0 (10) | 0.8 (2.0) | 0.0 (0.0) | 0.0 (0.0) | 0.0 (0.0) | 0.0 (0.0) | 0.0 (0.0) | 0.2 (0.51) | 2.1 (5.3) | 9.9 (25) | 38.3 (97) |
| Average extreme snow depth inches (cm) | 8.5 (22) | 7.5 (19) | 4.5 (11) | 0.6 (1.5) | 0.0 (0.0) | 0.0 (0.0) | 0.0 (0.0) | 0.0 (0.0) | 0.0 (0.0) | 0.2 (0.51) | 1.6 (4.1) | 5.6 (14) | 11.0 (28) |
| Average precipitation days (≥ 0.01 in) | 12.8 | 10.0 | 9.6 | 12.7 | 14.2 | 11.8 | 9.7 | 11.5 | 10.5 | 13.3 | 11.4 | 12.4 | 139.9 |
| Average snowy days (≥ 0.1 in) | 8.6 | 7.1 | 3.0 | 1.0 | 0.0 | 0.0 | 0.0 | 0.0 | 0.0 | 0.1 | 1.5 | 7.3 | 28.6 |
Source: NOAA

== Demographics ==
Historical population
| Census | Pop. | Note | %± |
|---|---|---|---|
| 1860 | 1,160 | | — |
| 1870 | 2,065 | | 78.0% |
| 1880 | 2,501 | | 21.1% |
| 1890 | 6,564 | | 162.5% |
| 1900 | 8,696 | | 32.5% |
| 1910 | 9,639 | | 10.8% |
| 1920 | 12,575 | | 30.5% |
| 1930 | 14,496 | | 15.3% |
| 1940 | 14,424 | | −0.5% |
| 1950 | 15,948 | | 10.6% |
| 1960 | 17,006 | | 6.6% |
| 1970 | 17,179 | | 1.0% |
| 1980 | 16,455 | | −4.2% |
| 1990 | 16,322 | | −0.8% |
| 2000 | 15,713 | | −3.7% |
| 2010 | 15,194 | | −3.3% |
| 2020 | 14,714 | | −3.2% |
U.S. Decennial Census

=== 2020 census ===
As of the 2020 census, Owosso had a population of 14,714. The median age was 37.3 years. 23.5% of residents were under the age of 18 and 16.2% of residents were 65 years of age or older. For every 100 females there were 91.7 males, and for every 100 females age 18 and over there were 89.0 males age 18 and over.

99.9% of residents lived in urban areas, while 0.1% lived in rural areas.

There were 6,267 households in Owosso, of which 29.2% had children under the age of 18 living in them. Of all households, 36.4% were married-couple households, 20.0% were households with a male householder and no spouse or partner present, and 32.4% were households with a female householder and no spouse or partner present. About 33.7% of all households were made up of individuals and 13.8% had someone living alone who was 65 years of age or older.

There were 6,796 housing units, of which 7.8% were vacant. The homeowner vacancy rate was 2.1% and the rental vacancy rate was 6.3%.

Racial composition as of the 2020 census
| Race | Number | Percent |
|---|---|---|
| White | 13,467 | 91.5% |
| Black or African American | 134 | 0.9% |
| American Indian and Alaska Native | 55 | 0.4% |
| Asian | 59 | 0.4% |
| Native Hawaiian and Other Pacific Islander | 6 | 0.0% |
| Some other race | 141 | 1.0% |
| Two or more races | 852 | 5.8% |
| Hispanic or Latino (of any race) | 684 | 4.6% |

==Arts and culture==

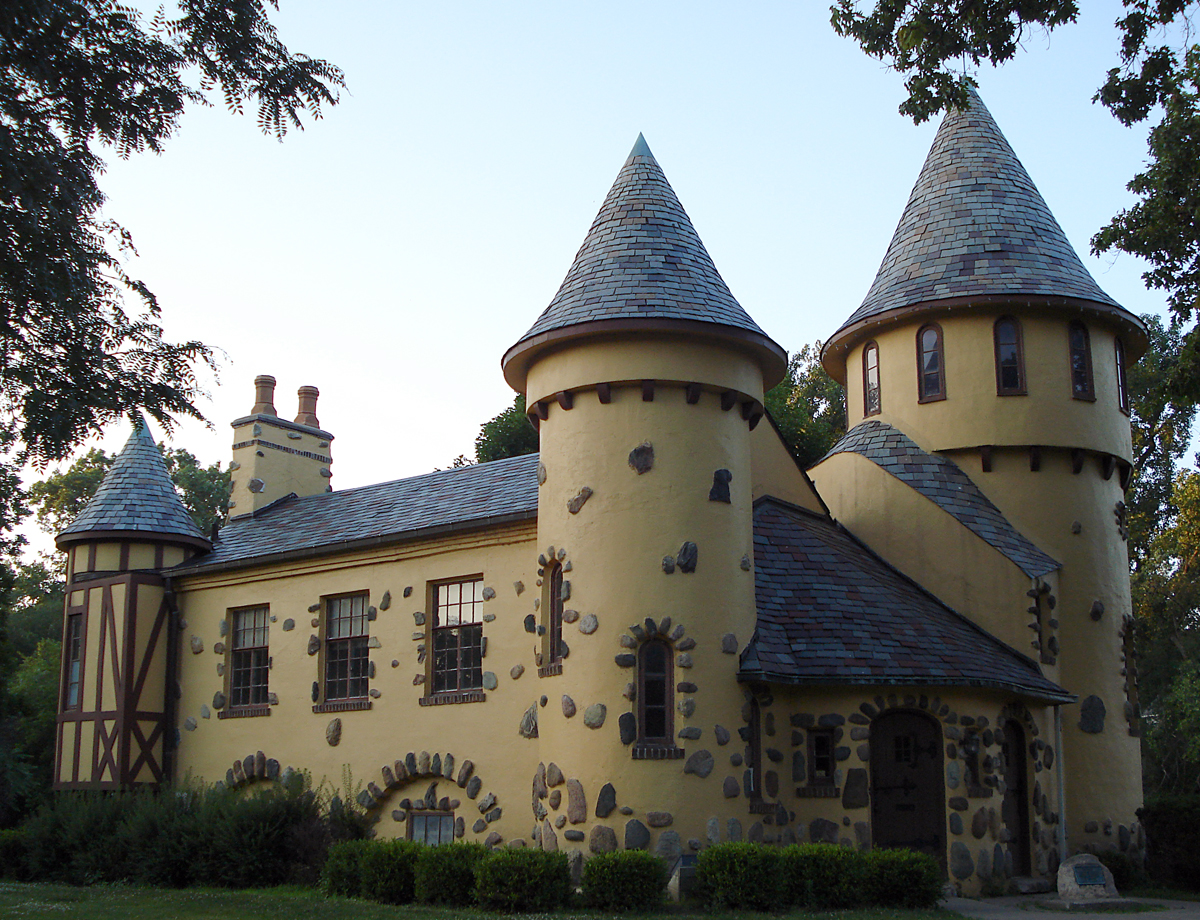
Curwood Castle, listed on the National Register of Historic Places

- Curwood Castle was the writing studio of notable author James Oliver Curwood. It is listed on the National Register of Historic Places. The castle is operated as a museum that contains period antiques, and Curwood books, photos, and movie posters, as well as memorabilia related to politician Thomas E. Dewey, another notable native son.
- The Shiawasse Arts Center exhibits and sells prints of Frederick Carl Frieseke, and original work of other artists. It also holds art classes, and competitions, and has exhibitions scheduled throughout the year.

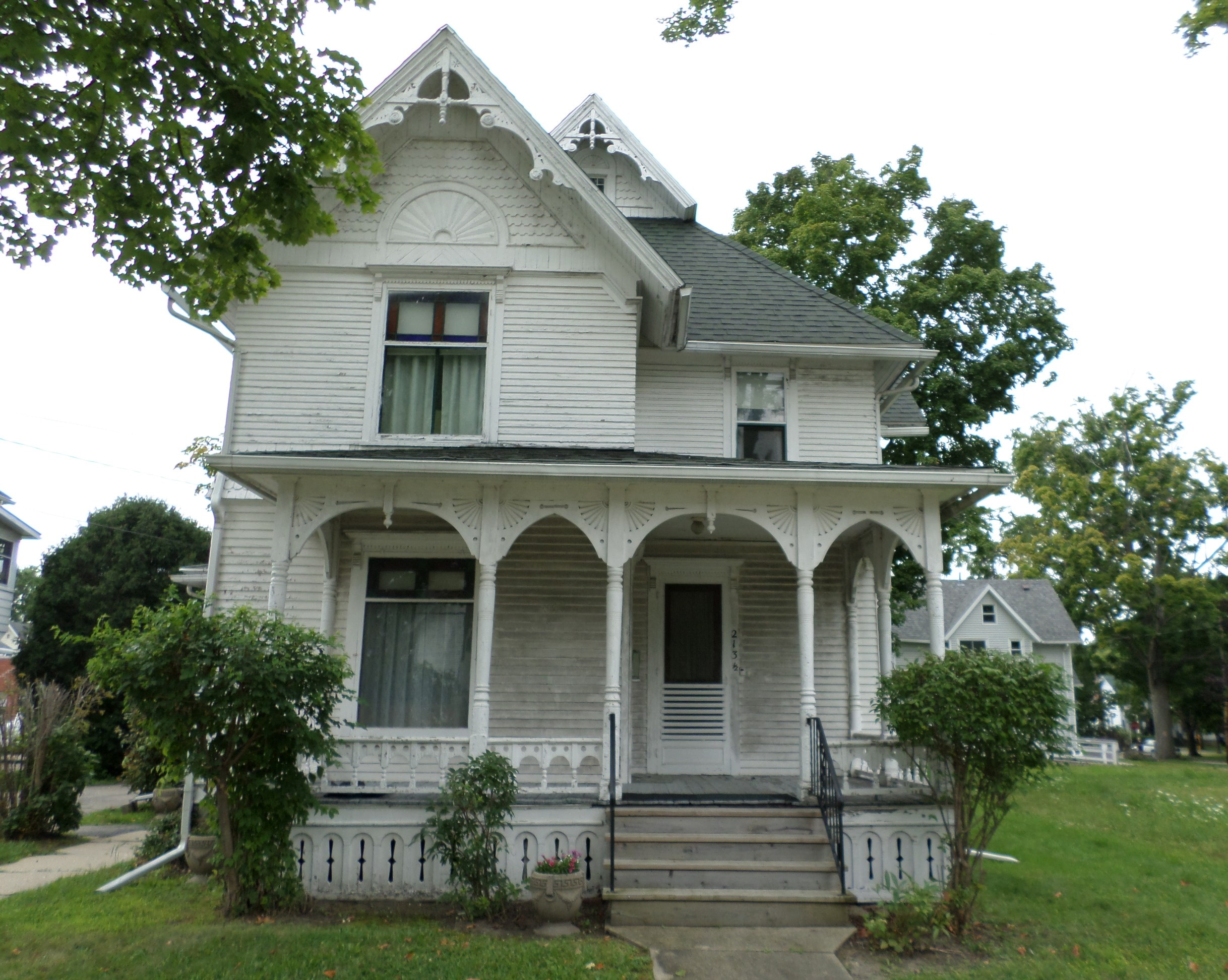
The George Perrigo House, listed on the National Register of Historic Places

- The American Record Pressing Company, accredited for The Beatles first vinyl pressing in the United States
- The Curwood Festival, to honor the author and books, is held annually and includes a street fair, parades, contests including raft races, carnival rides, concerts, a medieval reenactment encampment, and more.

=== 2010 census ===
As of the census of 2010, there were 15,194 people, 6,161 households, and 3,779 families residing in the city. The population density was 2,905.2 inhabitants per square mile (1,121.7/km^{2}). There were 6,823 housing units at an average density of 1,304.6 per square mile (503.7/km^{2}). The racial makeup of the city was 95.7% White, 0.8% African American, 0.5% Native American, 0.3% Asian, 0.6% from other races, and 2.1% from two or more races. Hispanic or Latino of any race were 3.9% of the population.

There were 6,161 households, of which 33.1% had children under the age of 18 living with them, 39.0% were married couples living together, 16.7% had a female householder with no husband present, 5.7% had a male householder with no wife present, and 38.7% were non-families. 31.9% of all households were made up of individuals, and 12.5% had someone living alone who was 65 years of age or older. The average household size was 2.41 and the average family size was 3.00.

The median age in the city was 34.8 years. 25.2% of residents were under the age of 18; 11.5% were between the ages of 18 and 24; 25.9% were from 25 to 44; 24.7% were from 45 to 64; and 12.8% were 65 years of age or older. The gender makeup of the city was 48.4% male and 51.6% female.

=== 2000 census ===
As of the census of 2000, there were 15,713 people, 6,340 households, and 4,076 families. The population density was 3,174.5 inhabitants per square mile (1,225.7/km^{2}). There were 6,724 housing units at an average density of 1,358.4 per square mile (524.5/km^{2}). The racial makeup of the city was 97% White, 0.20% African American, 0.60% Native American, 0.40% Asian, 0.80% from other races, and 1.10% from two or more races. Hispanic or Latino of any race were 3% of the population.

There were 6,340 households, out of which 33.5% had children under the age of 18 living with them, 45.0% were married couples living together, 14.6% had a female householder with no husband present, and 35.7% were non-families. 29.8% of all households were made up of individuals, and 12.6% had someone living alone who was 65 years of age or older. The average household size was 2.45 and the average family size was 3.03.

In the city, the population was spread out, with 27.3% under the age of 18, 9.8% from 18 to 24, 29.4% from 25 to 44, 19.9% from 45 to 64, and 13.5% who were 65 years of age or older. The median age was 34 years. For every 100 females, there were 89.3 males. For every 100 females age 18 and over, there were 84.0 males.

The median income for a household in the city was $32,576, and the median income for a family was $40,355. Males had a median income of $32,285 versus $22,534 for females. The per capita income for the city was $16,764. About 10.0% of families and 13.2% of the population were below the poverty line, including 16.8% of those under age 18 and 6.9% of those age 65 or over.

== Government ==
The city has a council–manager form of government. Owosso is served by the Shiawassee District Library branch.

== Education ==
The former John Wesley College began in 1949 as Owosso Bible College, and closed in 1981.

Education is provided by the Owosso Public Schools, which owns the historic Lincoln School on Michigan Avenue south of M-21. Owosso High School is the sole high school in the city.

Salem Lutheran School is a grade school (Pre-K-8) of the Wisconsin Evangelical Lutheran Synod in Owosso.

== Transportation ==
=== Roads ===
- M-21 runs east and west through the city
- M-52 runs north and south through the city
- M-71 runs diagonally, southeast and northwest, terminating at M-21

=== City Bus Service ===
The Shiawassee Area Transportation Agency (SATA) provides city bus service. The majority of buses are lift-equipped, and the service operates from 6:00 a.m. to 10:00 p.m. on Mondays through Fridays. The service also provides a single daily bus run to and from Perry, Michigan, and another to and from Durand, Michigan.

=== Intercity Bus Service ===
Owosso is the headquarters of Indian Trails Bus Lines, which provides regularly scheduled intercity bus service from Owosso to connect with points throughout Michigan and the U. S. Indian Trails also provides chartered bus service to and from points throughout the U. S.

=== Air ===
Owosso Community Airport provides a 4,300-foot (1,300 m) long lighted runway for private planes and air taxi services.

=== Rail ===
Owosso is the headquarters of the Great Lakes Central Railroad, which provides freight service to Northern and Southern Michigan. It also provides chartered passenger rail service and tours through its association with Lake Central Rail Tours. Owosso was the location of three different railroad stations for different railroad companies: Ann Arbor Railroad (Elberta, Michigan - Toledo, Ohio); New York Central Railroad, nee Michigan Central (Bay City - Jackson) and Grand Trunk Western (Muskegon - Detroit).

== Notable people ==
- Alvin M. Bentley, philanthropist, foreign service officer and U.S. Congressman
- Leann Birch, developmental psychologist
- Chester Brewer, athlete, Michigan State and Missouri football head coach and athletic director
- Diane Carey, author
- John J. Cavanaugh, C.S.C., fourteenth president of the University of Notre Dame and informal chaplain to the Kennedy family.
- James Oliver Curwood, conservationist and author
- Thomas E. Dewey, lawyer, author, and politician, Governor of New York, 1944 and 1948 Republican presidential candidate
- Frederick Carl Frieseke, American Impressionist artist
- Sanford M. Green, Michigan jurist and legislator
- Alfred D. Hershey, bacteriologist and co-winner of the 1969 Nobel Prize in medicine/physiology
- Etta Doane Marden (1851-1946), American missionary in Turkey, 1881-1925
- Mel Schacher, member of the rock bands ? and the Mysterians and Grand Funk Railroad
- Scott Kinsey, keyboardist and member of the band Tribal Tech
- Rob Oliver, Emmy-nominated animation director for The Simpsons
- Cora Taylor, co-founder of Owosso's Indian Trails Bus Line
- C. Warren Thornthwaite, Professor of Climatology at Johns Hopkins University
- John Tomac, bicycle racer and builder
- Brad Van Pelt, football player, Michigan State and 14-year NFL career, 5-time Pro Bowl selection
- Bradlee Van Pelt, football player
- Lloyd R. Welch, Professor Emeritus at the University of Southern California

== See also ==
- List of sundown towns in the United States
