= Flint water crisis =

Public health crisis in Flint, Michigan

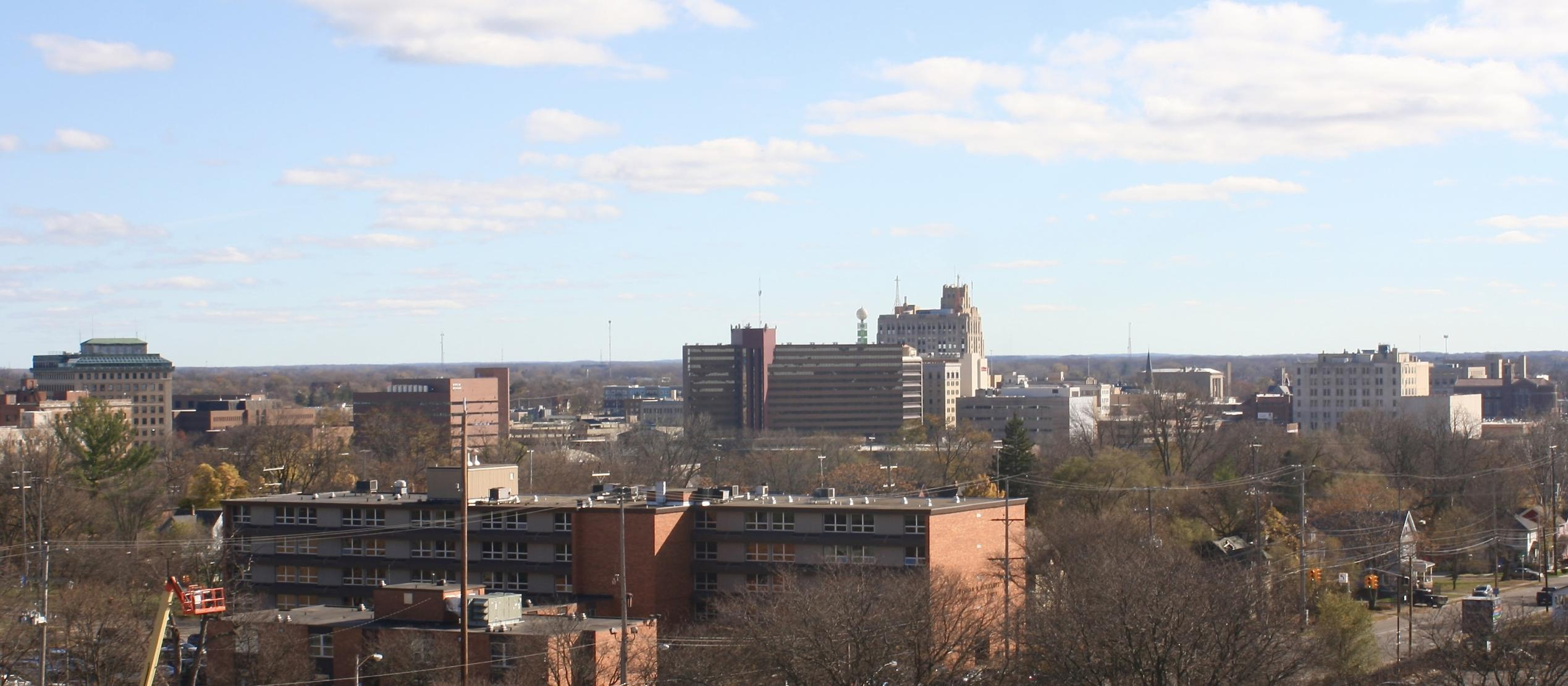
- Flint in 2022
- Time: April 2014 – February 2019
- Location: Flint, Michigan, United States; 43°03′22″N 83°40′15″W
- Type: Water contamination: Lead; Legionnaires' disease outbreak; Coliform bacteria; THMs
- Outcome: 6,000–12,000 children exposed to lead; Public health state of emergency; 79 lawsuits; Several investigations; 4 resignations; 4 firings; 5 suspensions; 15 indicted; 1 found guilty
- Deaths: 12 fatalities from Legionnaires' disease
- Accused: 15 face charges
- Convicted: 1 – Corinne Miller
- Sentence: Corinne Miller – a year of probation, 300 hours of community service, and fine of $1,200.

The Flint water crisis was a public health crisis from 2014 to 2019 which involved the drinking water for the city of Flint, Michigan, being contaminated with lead and possibly Legionella bacteria.

In April 2014, during a financial crisis, state-appointed emergency manager Darnell Earley changed Flint's water source from the Detroit Water and Sewerage Department (sourced from Lake Huron and the Detroit River) to the Flint River. Residents complained about the taste, smell, and appearance of the water. Officials failed to apply corrosion inhibitors to the water, which resulted in lead from aging pipes leaching into the water supply, exposing around 100,000 residents to elevated lead levels. A pair of scientific studies confirmed that lead contamination was present in the water supply. The city switched back to the Detroit water system on October 16, 2015. It later signed a 30-year contract with the new Great Lakes Water Authority (GLWA) on November 22, 2017.

On January 5, 2016, Michigan Governor Rick Snyder declared a state of emergency in Genesee County, of which Flint is the major population center. Shortly thereafter, President Barack Obama declared a federal state of emergency, authorizing additional help from the Federal Emergency Management Agency and the Department of Homeland Security.

Between 6,000 and 12,000 children were exposed to drinking water with high levels of lead. Children are particularly at risk from the long-term effects of lead poisoning, which can include a reduction in intellectual functioning and IQ, increased issues with mental and physical health, and an increased chance of Alzheimer's disease. The water supply change was considered a possible cause of an outbreak of Legionnaires' disease in the county that killed 12 people and affected another 87, but the original source of the bacteria was never found.

Four government officials—one from the city of Flint, two from the Michigan Department of Environmental Quality (MDEQ), and one from the Environmental Protection Agency (EPA)—resigned over the mishandling of the crisis, and one additional MDEQ staff member was fired. In January 2021, former Michigan Governor Rick Snyder and eight other officials were charged with 34 felony counts and seven misdemeanors—41 counts in all—for their role in the crisis. Two officials were charged with involuntary manslaughter. Fifteen criminal cases have been filed against local and state officials, but only one minor conviction has been obtained, and all other charges have been dismissed or dropped. On August 20, 2020, the victims of the water crisis were awarded a combined settlement of $600 million, with 80% going to the families of children affected by the crisis. By November, the settlement grew to $641 million.

An extensive lead service pipe replacement effort has been underway since 2016. In early 2017, some officials asserted that the water quality had returned to acceptable levels, but in January 2019, residents and officials expressed doubt about the cleanliness of the water, in part due to misinformation and faulty testing methods. There were an estimated 2,500 lead service pipes still in place as of April 2019. As of December 8, 2020, fewer than 500 service lines still needed to be inspected. As of July 16, 2021, 27,133 water service lines had been excavated and inspected, resulting in the replacement of 10,059 lead pipes. After $400 million in state and federal spending, Flint has secured a clean water source, distributed filters to all who want them, and laid modern, safe, copper pipes to nearly every home in the city. Politico declared that its water is "just as good as any city's in Michigan." However, a legacy of distrust remains, and many residents still refuse to drink the tap water.

== Timeline ==
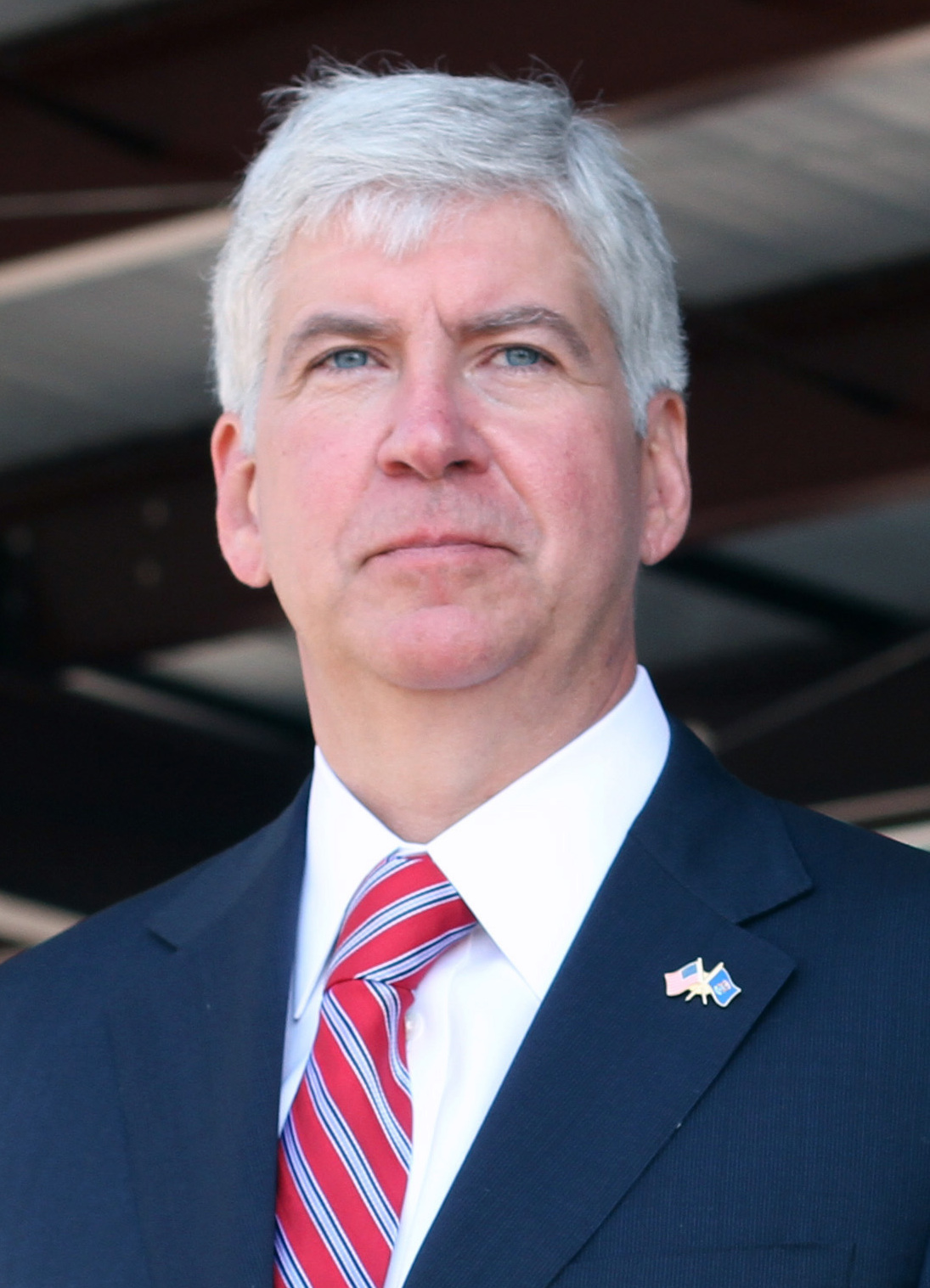
Governor Rick Snyder and his administration were widely blamed for the decisions that led to the crisis, with numerous people calling for his resignation. He left office on December 31, 2018, due to term limits but was charged with willful neglect of duty in January 2021.

The following is a sequence of events related to the Flint water crisis.

=== Pre-switch (1967–2013) ===
- 1967–2013 – The city of Flint receives its water from the Detroit Water and Sewerage Department, sourced from Lake Huron. The city operates under a plan to use the Flint River as an emergency water source.
- November 29, 2011 – Three weeks after the city declared a state of financial emergency, Governor Snyder appoints Michael Brown as the city's Emergency Manager, effective December 1. He is the first of four such managers who will effectively take the place of the mayor until 2015, when a Receivership Transition Advisory Board will be appointed.
- March 22, 2012 – County officials announce plans for a new pipeline to reduce the costs of delivering water from Lake Huron to Flint.
- April 16, 2013 – The city approves the Karegnondi Water Authority contract.
- April 17, 2013 – Detroit terminates its water service contract.

=== 2014 ===
- April 25 – A worker named Mike Glasgow, who was a supervisor at the plant, warned the State of Michigan Department of Environmental Quality that he did not think the switch was a good idea.
- April 25 – After construction delays, the water source switch to the Flint River is completed. This date is considered the start of the water crisis.
- June – although not announced until 2016, an outbreak of Legionnaires' disease begins, and continues through November 2015.
- August 14 – The city announces a water boiling advisory for parts of the city. The advisory is lifted on August 20. A second warning is issued in September.
- October – Flint's General Motors engine plant discontinues using Flint tap water because high levels of chloride are corroding engine parts.

=== 2015 ===
- January 12 – City officials decline an offer to reconnect to Lake Huron water, concerned about higher water rates.
- January 21 – Flint residents complain of health issues caused by city water. Residents bring bottles of discolored tap water to a community meeting.
- February 26 – EPA manager Miguel Del Toral detects that lead levels in the water at the home of Flint resident LeeAnne Walters are seven times greater than the EPA's acceptable limit.
- March 23 – Flint City Council members vote to reconnect to Detroit water. Emergency manager Jerry Ambrose overrules the vote.
- June 24 – Del Toral states in a memo that Virginia Tech scientists, led by water expert Marc Edwards, found extremely high lead levels in four homes.
- July 9 – Flint Mayor Dayne Walling drinks Flint tap water on local television in an attempt to dispel residents' fear of drinking the water.
- July 13 – In response to Del Toral's memo, a Michigan Department of Environmental Quality (MDEQ) official tells Michigan Radio, "Anyone who is concerned about lead in the drinking water in Flint can relax."
- September 8 – Virginia Tech's water study team reports that 40% of Flint homes have elevated levels of lead.
- September 9 – MDEQ spokesman Brad Wurfel states that Flint needs to upgrade its infrastructure but is skeptical about Virginia Tech's water study.
- September 11 – Virginia Tech recommends that the state of Michigan declare that the water in Flint is not safe for drinking or cooking.
- September 24 – Hurley Medical Center pediatrician Mona Hanna-Attisha releases her study showing an increased number of children with high levels of lead in their blood after the water source switched to the Flint River.
- October 15 – Michigan Governor Rick Snyder signs a bill for $9.35 million to reconnect to the Detroit water system and provide relief. The switch is made the following day.
- December 15 – Flint Mayor Karen Weaver declares a state of emergency.
- December 29 – MDEQ Director Dan Wyant resigns.
- December 30 – Governor Snyder apologizes in public for the crisis.

=== 2016 ===
- January 5 – Governor Snyder declares a state of emergency in Genesee County.
- January 6 – Governor Snyder apologises again for the Flint water crisis.
- January 12 – The Michigan National Guard mobilizes to help distribute water in Flint.
- January 13 – Governor Snyder announces that an outbreak of Legionnaires' disease occurred in the Flint area between June 2014 and November 2015.
- January 14 – Governor Snyder asks President Barack Obama to declare a disaster in Flint.
- January 16 – President Obama declares a state of emergency in Flint and authorizes $5 million in aid.
- February 3 – The House Committee on Oversight and Government Reform holds a hearing on the Flint water crisis.
- February 4 – Water service lines are identified as the main source of lead in tap water, but there are almost no verified service line materials in Flint because of outdated records. Mayor Weaver appoints Michael C.H. McDaniel, a retired National Guard brigadier general, to oversee the group leading the lead service line replacement project, the Flint Action and Sustainability Team (FAST).
- February 8 – Governor Snyder turns down a second invitation to testify at a congressional hearing on the crisis.
- March 17 – Governor Snyder testifies before the House Committee on Oversight and Government Reform.
- April 20 – Criminal charges are filed against government employees Mike Glasgow, Stephen Busch, and Mike Prysby.
- May 4 – President Obama visits Flint to hear first-hand how residents have endured the city's water crisis and to highlight federal assistance to state and local agencies. He also drank some filtered Flint water.
- July 29 – Six state workers are criminally charged as investigations continue.
- September – The city begins using a machine learning model developed by two University of Michigan professors, which uses various data about the home and neighborhood to predict its likelihood of having a lead service line. The model is used throughout 2016 and 2017 to prioritize excavations, yielding a hit rate of about 80%.
- November 10 – A federal judge orders the implementation of door-to-door delivery of bottled water to every home without a properly installed and maintained faucet filter.
- December 19 – State of Michigan Office of Special Counsel publishes Investigator's Report on Attorney General Case 16-0003 (defendants Earley, Ambrose, Croft, and Johnson).
- December 20 – Four officials are charged with felonies of false pretenses and conspiracy.

=== 2017 ===
- January 24 – The MDEQ declares that, in a six-month-long study, the city's water tested below the federal limit.
- February 8 – State official Richard Baird informs Flint residents that the year-long state water bill subsidy will end, effective March 1, 2017.
- February 16 – The Centers for Disease Control and Prevention (CDC) finds the first genetic link from Legionnaires' disease to Flint's water supply.
- February 20 – The state considers ending bottled water distribution.
- March 1 – The state officially ends water bill subsidies for residents of Flint.
- March 15 – President Donald Trump meets with Mayor Weaver to discuss infrastructure funding for Flint.
- March 16 – Snyder creates the Child Lead Exposure Elimination Commission in an effort to avoid future lead poisoning outbreaks.
- March 28 – A settlement is reached between the plaintiffs and the city, resulting in a federal judge approving $97 million in funding for Michigan to examine and replace lead water service lines for 18,000 Flint homes, to be completed in a three-year time frame.
- April 18 – Weaver recommends staying with the Great Lakes Water Authority, which would reverse a 2012 decision that started the water crisis. Governor Snyder agrees with her decision.
- April 20 – At a town hall meeting regarding the crisis, six people are arrested at a Flint church for disorderly conduct and interfering with the police. The meeting is criticized as having violated Michigan's Opening Meetings Act.
- April 28 – Weaver announces that the city has plans to remove lead piping at 6,000 homes by the end of the year. The project is funded by a $100 million grant approved by Congress earlier that week.
- May 3 – A notice, warning 8,000 residents that their water will be turned off after lack of payment, causes a controversy in the city.
- May 17 – It is reported that 128 blood tests in Flint may have registered falsely low lead levels.
- June 14 – Attorney General Bill Schuette charges five officials with involuntary manslaughter and one official with obstruction of justice and lying to a police officer.
- June 20 – MDEQ threatens Flint with legal action if a water contract is not approved by June 26, 2017. Mayor Weaver calls for the Flint city council to approve a 30-year contract with the Great Lakes Water Authority.
- June 26 – After several hours of debate, city council decides to postpone the vote on whether to approve the 30-year GLWA (Great Lakes Water Authority) contract until September 2017.
- June 28 – Michigan sues Flint, alleging that the city council's failure to approve a recommendation to buy water long-term from the GLWA is endangering the public. Flint hires an attorney to fight the charges and renegotiate the contract with the state.
- July 24 – The Flint Fast Start initiative announces that over 2,500 of the approximately 30,000 homes needing new water service lines have completed pipe replacement.
- August 11 – MDEQ releases a letter stating that Flint has "significant deficiencies", which among other issues include source water, financial, distribution system, management and operations.
- August 29 – A study published in the American Chemical Society's publication Environmental Science & Technology states that the Flint River was "a likely trigger contributing to the increase in Legionnaires' disease incidence."
- September 15 – Water from 138 Flint homes tested during the prior month by Virginia Tech registers lead levels well below the federal guidelines. Marc Edwards states it is likely the last time such sampling coordinated by Virginia Tech will be necessary in Flint.
- September 20 – A study conducted by professors David Slusky and Daniel Grossman is released demonstrating that fertility rates decreased by 12 percent among Flint women and fetal death rates increased by 58 percent since the switch to the Flint River in 2014.
- October 9 – State prosecutors announce that Eden Wells, Michigan's top medical official, will be charged with involuntary manslaughter for her role in the water crisis, which was linked to an outbreak of Legionnaires' disease that caused at least 12 deaths.
- October 9 – Flint city council hires a North Dakota-based environmental consultant for $150,000 to conduct an analysis of the city's potential future water sources.
- October 10 – A Michigan Department of Health and Human Services study finds that the Flint River water did not contribute to the increase in infant deaths and stillbirths in Flint.
- October 17 – A federal judge orders the city of Flint to choose a long-term water source by October 23, 2017.
- October 26 – An EPA report finds fault with Michigan's oversight of Flint's drinking water system, placing the most blame with the MDEQ.
- October 31 – The city council votes to extend its contract with the GLWA for another 30 days while a long-term deal is pending.
- November 21 – The city council votes 5–4 to sign a 30-year contract with GLWA.

=== 2018 ===
- January – The city contracts a private consulting firm, AECOM, to take over water service line excavations and stops using the machine learning model. During 2018, 10,531 excavations are performed, yielding a hit rate of only 15%.
- January 8 – MDEQ official Eric Oswald tells the EPA he also has concerns about Flint's "long-term, technical, managerial and financial capacity" to handle the responsibility and that "the city faces numerous challenges in staffing its limited water treatment plant."
- January 12 – An MDEQ study for the first half of 2017 claims 90% of water samples were at or below 7 parts per billion (ppb) of lead, with an official stating the city's "water quality is restored." Over 30,000 Flint water samples have been tested during the crisis.
- February 5 – A Proceedings of the National Academy of Sciences study on the causes of an outbreak of Legionnaires' disease in Flint in 2014 and 2015 finds that low chlorine levels were the cause. Chlorine, which kills microbes responsible for the disease, also reacts with heavy metals like lead and iron. High levels of lead and iron in Flint's water may have been responsible for the decreased amount of chlorine available.
- March 12 – Data from MDEQ Quality shows the spike in samples from Flint elementary schools that tested above 15 ppb of lead, the threshold under the EPA Lead and Copper Rule.
- March 26 – A study published in The Journal of Pediatrics shows blood lead levels in Flint children ages 5 and younger hit an all-time low in 2016.
- April 2 – A new study by the MDEQ reports that elevated lead levels were found in 4 percent of final water samples from Flint Community Schools. One school's results show lead levels at 100 ppb, six times the federal action level.
- April 6 – The state announces the distribution of free bottled water in the city is ending. Water distribution centers will close over the next few days, although water and replacement cartridges will still be available. In response, Mayor Weaver says the city plans to sue the state so it can continue. The program was funded through a $450 million federal loan, which had not run out. Michigan planned to end the distribution since tests of Flint's water show low lead levels. The distribution continues until the supply runs out.
- April 7 – Hundreds of Flint residents flee to water bottle distribution centers to gather remaining free water bottles. Residents are still worried about drinking water from taps, since not all of the pipelines have been switched.
- April 12 – A federal judge approves a $4.1M settlement to be used to test Flint children for lead poisoning.
- April 13 – The Natural Resources Defense Council announces the results of tests of 92 homes with lead service lines show the 90th percentile for lead is 4 ppb.
- April 23 – Flint resident LeeAnne Walters is awarded the Goldman Environmental Prize for her role in exposing the water crisis.
- April 26 – The EPA approves a $1.9 million grant to Virginia Tech professor Marc Edwards for nationwide research of lead contamination in drinking water, to ensure of the safety of future generations. The grant will be used to help people where there is a suspicion of lead being in their drinking water but government officials are not acting on it. This project is said to target Michigan and Louisiana initially, and then it will branch out to other areas.
- May 10 – Mayor Weaver announces that Nestlé will donate 1.6 million bottles of water (100,000 bottles of water per week) until September 3, 2018. Water will be available to Flint residents at distribution centers throughout the city.
- May 16 – Flint Department of Public Works Director Robert Bincsik sends a letter to the EPA saying there are still 14,000 lead service lines in the city, 15% more than previous projections.
- June 14 – Michigan enacts the strictest law in the United States for lead in drinking water, imposing a limit of 12 ppb, as opposed to the federal limit which is 15 ppb. This is projected to be achieved by 2025.
- June 15 – George Krisztian, an assistant director of MDEQ's Office of Drinking Water and Municipal Assistance, says that Flint's 90th percentile for lead was 6 ppb in the first six months of the year, up since the state stopped bottled water deliveries to the city in April. The MDEQ also says it is ready to turn the testing program back over to the city.
- July 30 – The MDEQ announces that in June and July 2018, of the 420 filtered water samples from Flint Public Schools tested, 100 percent were below 15 ppb of lead, and more than 99 percent met the 5 ppb bottled water standard.
- August 21 – NRDC and several local groups participate in a hearing regarding two major issues: whether the city can defend its lead service line inventory methods and whether the city should be required to install home water filters immediately following service line replacements to mitigate lead spikes in drinking water.
- September 24 – The mayor's office reports that a total of 15,031 pipes have been excavated at homes in Flint. This includes service lines to 7,233 homes that have been identified as lead and/or galvanized steel which have been replaced, including 1,005 homes newly discovered in 2018.
- September 28 – A report by the Michigan Department of Health and Human Services says the Genesee County Health Department failed to help 85% of children diagnosed with high blood lead levels in 2016.
- October 5 – Elon Musk donates approximately $480,000 to the Flint school system to pay for UV filtration devices in all 12 schools; installation is expected to be completed by January 2019.
- December 26 – In a published interview, governor-elect Gretchen Whitmer pledges to restore free water distribution to Flint residents.

=== 2019 ===
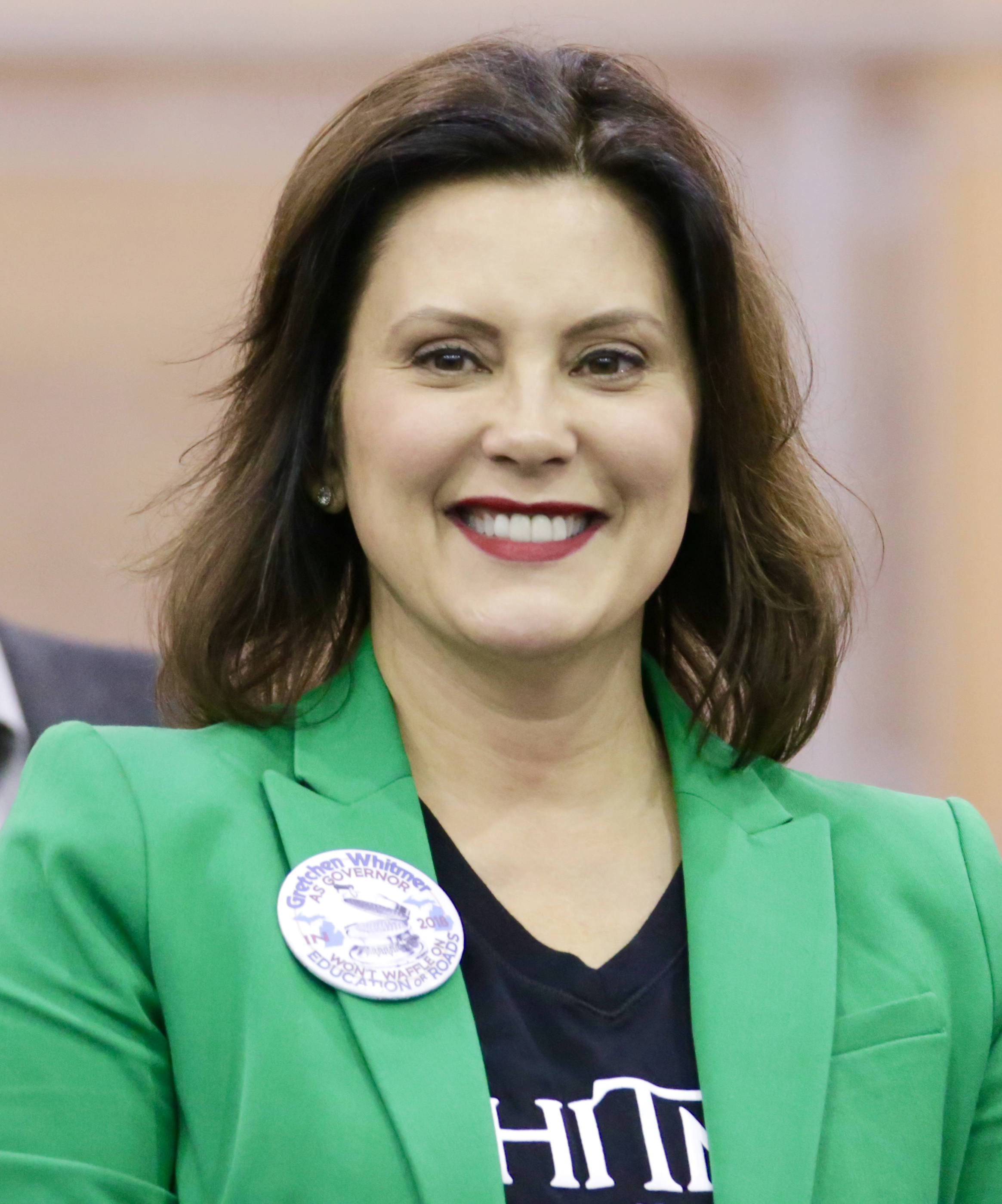
On her first day in office, Governor Gretchen Whitmer directed state employees to immediately report to their department or agency director any threat to public health or safety.

- January 2 – In her first act as governor, Whitmer signs an executive directive requiring state employees to immediately report to their department or agency director any threat to public health or safety, an action inspired by the decisions made by her predecessor's administration that led to the water crisis.
- January 4 – Michigan Attorney General Dana Nessel offers Wayne County Prosecutor Kym Worthy the job of special prosecutor on the Flint water crisis criminal cases, succeeding Todd Flood. Worthy accepts the job on February 21. Flood is reassigned as special assistant attorney general on February 25, while several other attorneys join the prosecution teams. On April 29, Flood is fired by Solicitor General Fadwa Hammoud, who claims he failed to "fully and properly" pursue potentially important evidence in criminal cases tied to the Flint water crisis.
- February 18 – A report posted online by the MDEQ says the 90th percentile for 51 high-risk homes tested in Flint from May through December 2018 was 4 ppb of lead – less than half the current federal and future state action level.
- March 28 – The March 2017 settlement is amended to require the city to replace thousands of lead service lines and return to using the machine learning model. By June 2019, the lead pipe hit rate rises to 60–70% for the excavations.
- April 23 – Status Coup, an independent investigative reporting network co-founded by Jordan Chariton and Jenn Dize, releases the documentary Flushing Flint, which claims that the water testing by MDEQ was manipulated by MDEQ staff taking water samples after flushing running water from taps for several minutes before taking the samples, contrary to normal procedures for water testing for copper and lead, and by MDEQ staff telling residents that they should take water samples after flushing running water from their taps for several minutes. This would clearly contravene the EPA guidance that samples taken must be "first-draw samples at taps in homes/buildings".
- May 30 – A new study by Virginia Tech professors Marc Edwards and Sid Roy published in the peer-reviewed journal Water Research relies on years of data from routine measurements of metals in Flint's sewage sludge, showing a connection between rising levels of lead in city waste, blood lead levels in children and use of the Flint River as a water source.
- June – The researchers responsible for developing the machine learning model, Eric Schwartz and Jake Abernethy, form BlueConduit, a for-profit, social venture aimed at leveraging data science and machine learning to find and remove lead pipes around the country.
- June 3 – The government-issued phones of 65 state officials, including former Governor Snyder, are seized in a criminal investigation into the crisis.
- June 13 – Attorney General Nessel announces that charges will be dropped against eight people and investigations will be restarted in the scandal.
- July 31 – The city fails to meet its self-imposed deadline to replace all service lines and defaults to its legally binding deadline of January 1, 2020.
- October 10 – The EPA proposes updates to the Lead and Copper Rule, which has remained relatively unchanged since 1991.
- December 31 – After falling short of a mandate to submit lead level testing results of at least 60 homes, the city asks for an extension to June 30, 2020, to do so.

=== 2020 ===
- February 21 – To date, 25,042 water service lines have been excavated, resulting in the replacement of 9,516 lead pipes and the verification of 15,526 existing copper pipes.
- April 16 – An article is published giving details of evidence of corruption and a coverup by Governor Snyder and his "fixer" Rich Baird, and stating that the statute of limitations on some of the most serious felony misconduct-in-office charges will expire on April 25, 2020. Michigan state authorities deny that a deadline is approaching and say that criminal prosecutions will follow.
- June 25 – BlueConduit releases the Flint Service Line Map, which allows users to look at the probability that a particular residence is connected to a lead service line and see the progress of replacement efforts.

=== 2021 ===
- January 13 – Michigan Attorney General Dana Nessel announces charges of willful neglect of office against former Governor Rick Snyder. Eight other people were also named in the indictment.
- May 2021 – The Michigan Strategic Fund approved the authorization of up to $700M in private activity financing as part of the "Flint water crisis" settlement agreement between state parties and plaintiffs' legal counsel that received preliminary court approval in early 2021.
- July 21 – An investigative report by Jordan Chariton and Jenn Dize published in The Intercept found that several key players in the crisis and cover-up had their phones wiped before investigators could examine them.

=== 2022 ===
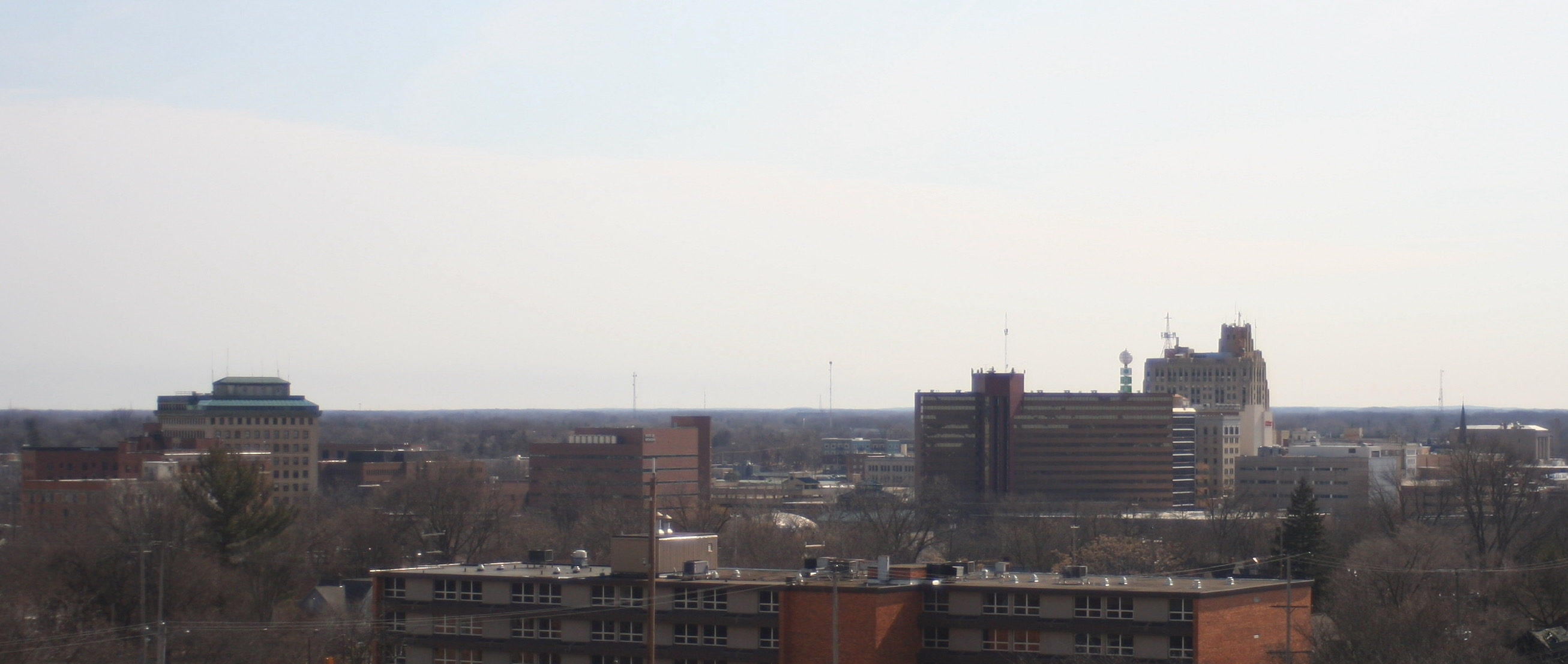
Flint in 2022

- January 17 – In an article for The Guardian, Jordan Chariton and Charlie LeDuff revealed that the prosecution team putting together a RICO case against several government officials for an allegedly fraudulent bond deal, which likely served as the catalyst for the water crisis, was disbanded in 2019 by incoming attorney general Dana Nessel, who launched a new set of investigations but dropped the RICO case.
- June 28 – The Michigan Supreme Court overturned the state's use of one-man grand juries to issue indictments in the Flint water criminal cases. In a unanimous decision, the state Supreme Court found that a one-judge grand jury can be used to investigate, subpoena and issue arrest warrants but it cannot be used to indict an individual. The Flint charges affected by the Supreme Court's decision include nine manslaughter charges against former state health Director Nick Lyon; two counts of willful neglect of duty against former Governor Rick Snyder; charges of perjury, misconduct in office, obstruction of justice and extortion against former Snyder aide Richard Baird; and a charge of perjury against Snyder chief of staff Jarrod Agen. Additional charges included nine counts of manslaughter, misconduct in office and willful neglect of duty against former state chief medical executive Dr. Eden Wells; three counts of misconduct in office against Flint emergency manager Darnell Earley; four counts of misconduct in office against emergency manager Gerald Ambrose; two counts of willful neglect of duty against former Flint Public Works Director Howard Croft; and two counts of misconduct in office and willful neglect of duty against Nancy Peeler, the state's director of maternal, infant and early childhood home visits.
- As of mid-July, the city says it has inspected 27,133 service lines and replaced 10,059 lead and galvanized lines. The city also said that is the "final phase" of lead line replacements that the city hopes to complete by the end of the year.

=== 2023 ===
- March – The Genesee County Circuit Court approved the Flint water settlement.
- September – After the lower court dismissed the felony charges related to the Flint Water Crisis, the Michigan Supreme Court declined to review the lower court ruling. Flint Mayor Sheldon Neeley responded to the Michigan Supreme Court with a complaint and criticism of their decision. He explained that the ruling affected the city's trust in the judicial system and governing body. Flint residents in Atwood also resonated with similar expressions, stating their exasperation over the injustice and lack of accountability from the legislative systems.
- October – A Michigan judge dropped the felony charges against government officials involved in the Flint water scandal, bringing the prosecution to a close.

=== 2024 ===
- February – Flint residents reach $25 million settlement with engineering firm Veolia North America.
- March – The City of Flint was held in contempt of court for their failure to meet their court-ordered deadlines regarding replacement of water lines and the subsequent requirement to "repair property damage to sidewalks, curbs and driveways caused by the work." On March 13, 2024, an article published in the journal Science Advances reported finding several different measurable detrimental effects of the city's water crisis on the children of Flint's mental health and school performance.
- April – The Flint community organized a march on the ten-year anniversary of the water crisis.
- August – Water testing shows a significant drop in lead in drinking water.

=== 2025 ===
- On July 1, 2025, the last lead pipe was replaced.

== Background ==
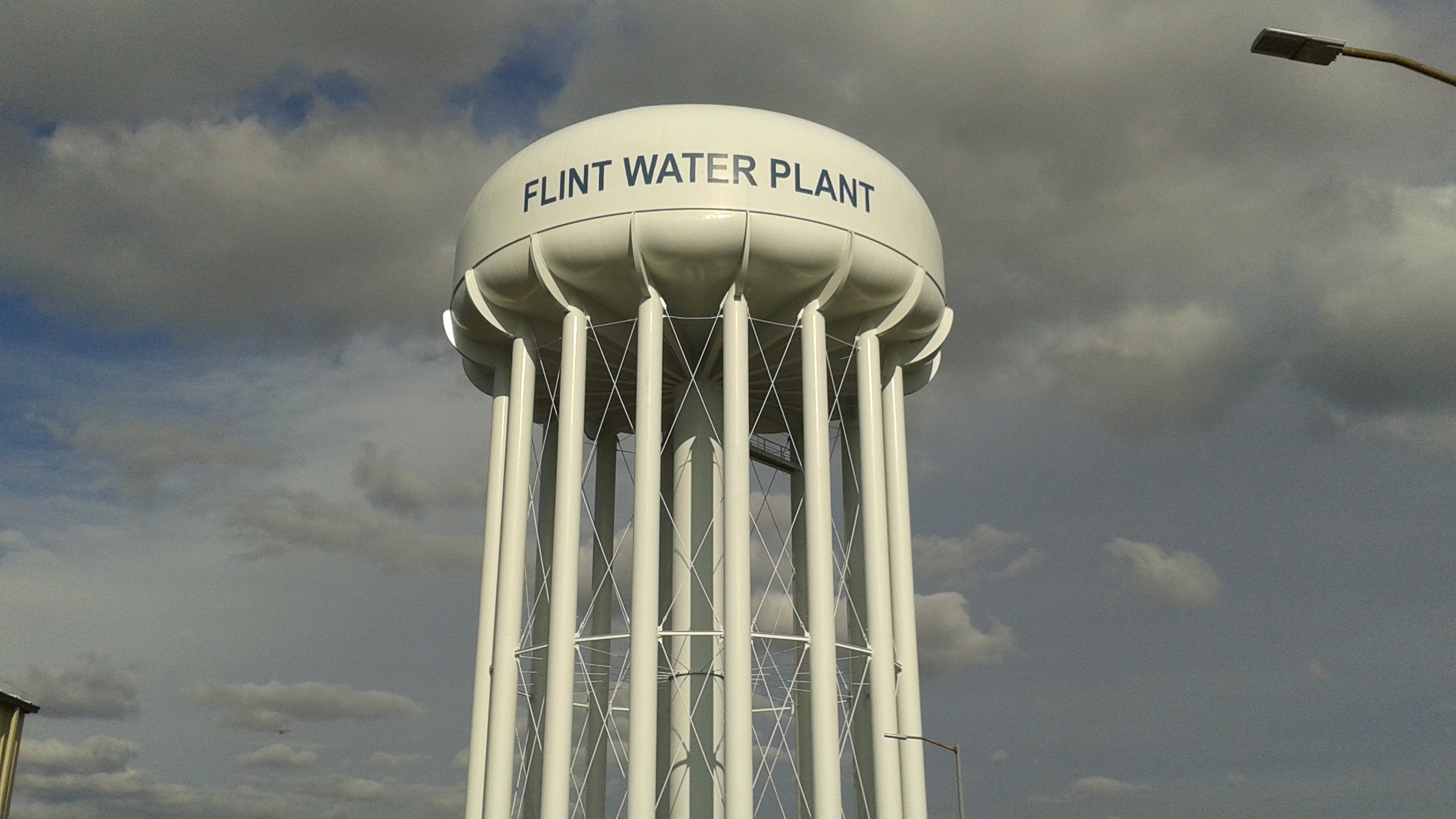
Water tower at the Flint Water Plant

Some water service lines in Flint were installed between 1901 and 1920. As with many other municipalities at the time, all of the service lines from the cast iron water mains to end users' homes were constructed of lead, because it was relatively inexpensive and easy to work. Lead from the pipes can leach into the water, especially if certain contaminants are present. However, the water from the Detroit Water and Sewerage Department, where Flint had obtained its water since 1967, had been treated well enough that the leaching from the lead pipes was at levels considered acceptable by state and federal environmental protection agencies. There are an estimated 43,000 service lines in the city; when the crisis began, these included 3,500 lead lines, 9,000 known galvanized steel lines, and 9,000 unknown service lines.

Lead exposure across the U.S. has fallen dramatically since the 1980s, but no blood-lead level is considered completely safe. Children under age five, and especially infants and unborn children, bear the greatest risk of deleterious and irreversible health outcomes. From 2012 to 2016, the CDC set a "reference level" of 5 micrograms per deciliter (μg/dL), in order to target for case management the 2.5% of young American children with the highest blood-lead levels. At 45 μg/dL, chelation therapy is considered. Among the many ways lead can enter a modern American's bloodstream is through lead plumbing. Acidic water makes it easier for the lead found in pipes, leaded solder, and brass faucets to dissolve and to enter a home's drinking water. Therefore, public water treatment systems are legally required to use control measures to make water less acidic. Plumbing that contains lead is often found in buildings constructed in the 1980s and earlier.

== Financial emergency ==
From 2011 to 2015, Governor Snyder appointed four emergency managers to control Flint's finances. After 2015, the city continued to receive financial guidance under the lesser oversight of a Receivership Transition Advisory Board.

1. Background and Initial Emergency Declaration: In the early months of 2011, Michigan Governor Rick Snyder stated that there was a financial emergency in Flint due to shortage in the budget made in the state. Michael Brown was appointed by the state as the first emergency manager below the Emergency Financial Law which granted authority to override local governments.
2. Water Source Change: To save money, Flint left the Detroit Water and Sewerage Department (DWSD) to join four other municipalities to form the Karegnondi Water Authority (KWA). While the pipeline connecting Flint to the KWA was under construction, Flint water was sourced from the Flint River (April 2014).
3. Subsequent Emergency Managers: When a city is in a state of emergency, the current governor appoints an emergency manager. During the Flint water crisis, the City of Flint has had four emergency managers: Michael Brown, Ed Kurtz, Darnell Earley, and Gerald Ambrose. These managers were criticized for neglecting the needs of Flint residents and for playing a role in the water crisis.

== Transition to a new water source ==
In 2011, Genesee County initiated the switch to the Karegnondi Water Authority (KWA); the KWA would supply water to both Genesee County and Flint. On March 25, 2013, the purchase of 16 million US gallons (61,000 m^{3}) per day from the KWA was approved by the Flint City Council. The KWA informed the council that they could dig to Lake Huron (the new water supply) in 30 months using a bored tunnel. Ed Kurtz, Flint's emergency manager, along with Mayor Dayne Walling and Flint City Council, approved the action and awaited the State Treasurer's approval. Following this decision, the Detroit Water and Sewerage Department (DWSD) negotiated with Flint officials by offering to restructure water payments. Flint declined, preferring to use KWA.

On April 1, 2013, DWSD demanded that the state deny Flint's request, as it would start a "water war", which would hurt DWSD. Drain Commissioner Wright of Genesee County accused the DWSD of media negotiation and then replied, "It would be unprecedented for the state to force one community to enter into an agreement with another, simply to artificially help one community at the other's expense ... this is exactly what the [Detroit Water and Sewerage Department] is arguing".

On April 15, 2013, State Treasurer Andy Dillon approved the water purchase contract with the KWA. Emergency Manager Kurtz signed the KWA water purchase agreement the following day. On April 17, the DWSD delivered its one-year termination notice after Flint rejected their last offer. The DWSD expected that Flint would reimburse the investments for the water system that benefited regional customers. Flint and Genesee County rejected such responsibility but indicated their willingness to purchase pipelines.

In April 2014, to save about $5 million in two years, Flint started treating water from the Flint River instead of purchasing Lake Huron water from Detroit. Previously, the Flint River was the backup water source. In June 2014, Flint's Emergency Manager Darnell Earley finalized the sale of a nine-mile (14 km) section of water pipeline to Genesee County for $3.9 million. This pipeline fed DWSD water into the county, and after the KWA pipeline was active, would service the eastern part of the county as well. By December 2014, the city had invested $4 million into its water plant. On July 1, 2014, Earley gave operational authority to Mayor Dayne Walling over two city departments, including Public Works. It was later reported that by not adding a corrosion inhibitor, Flint was going to save about $140 per day.

== Early water contamination ==
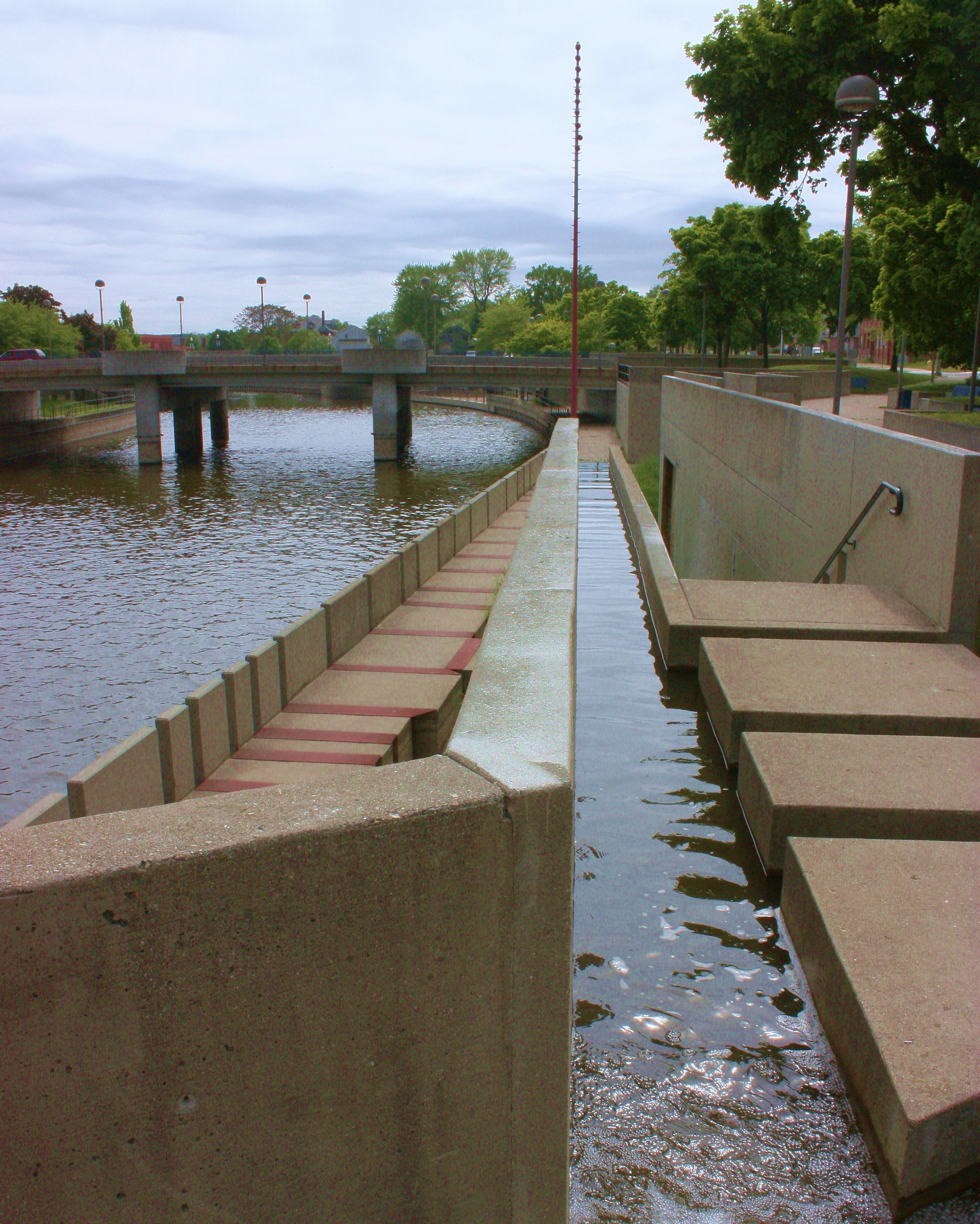
The Flint River in 2009

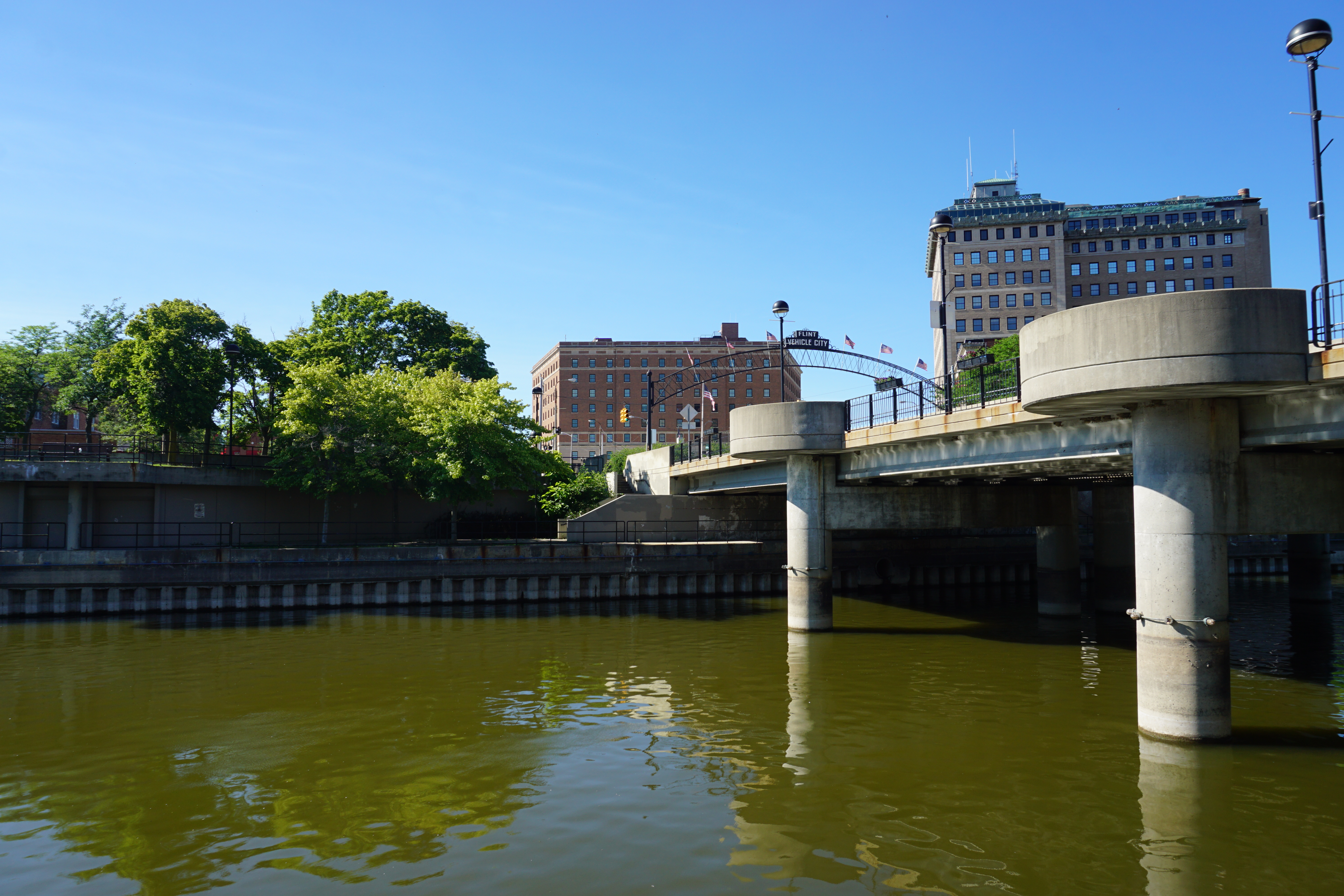
The Flint River in 2018

After the permanent switch to the Flint River, city residents began complaining about the color, taste, and odor of their water. In August and September 2014, city officials detected high levels of coliform bacteria, so residents were advised to boil their water. MDEQ determined that cold weather, aging pipes, and a population decline were the cause of these bacteria. According to Stephen Busch, an MDEQ district supervisor, the city took appropriate measures to limit a recurrence. General Motors (GM) made the first complaint about the corrosivity of the water. GM stopped using Flint water in October 2014, after reporting that the water was corroding car parts. General Motors requested to switch back to the DWSD water source, which was later approved by city officials.

Prior to August 2014, additional chlorine had been added to eliminate bacteria from the Flint River. This is likely the cause of a spike in trihalomethanes, unsafe chlorine byproducts, in one of eight water locations. Long-term exposure to these chemicals has been linked to cancer and other diseases. Following this test, the MDEQ placed Flint on violation notice but did not reveal the information to residents until January 2015. The employees of the Flint Public Library declared the water undrinkable after noticing that it was discolored, despite the city's claim that the water was safe. Since 2014, the library has provided safe water for the public alongside the state's most prominent bottled water provider. January and February 2015 tests showed that the city water met all health and safety standards. Nevertheless, the DWSD offered to reconnect Flint, waiving a $4 million connection fee, but was declined by Emergency Manager Jerry Ambrose. MDEQ officials indicated that there is no "imminent threat to public health", as the nature of the issue was "communicated poorly".

=== Return to Detroit water ===
In March 2015, Flint voted to switch back to the DWSD. This vote was motivated by residential complaints and recommendations from Veolia North America to prevent the city from further violating the Safe Drinking Water Act. Ambrose disagreed with the reintroduction of the Detroit water source. Ambrose argued, "Flint water today is safe by all Environmental Protection Agency and Michigan Department of Environmental Quality standards, and the city is working daily to improve its quality." In August 2015, it was found that local organizations observed that high concentrations of chloride caused the water to be orange and that the water contained high levels of lead. The lead levels were caused by the omission of orthophosphate treatments, which led to excessive pipe corrosion. Consequently, the three organizations "delivered more than 26,000 online petition signatures to Mayor Dayne Walling, demanding the city end its use of the Flint River and reconnect to the Detroit water system." Flint's water supply was switched back to DWSD in October 2015. Subsequently, Flint started adding additional orthophosphate to the water to rebuild the pipe lining.

On October 8, 2015, Snyder requested that Michigan legislators contribute $6 million of the $12 million for Flint to return to Lake Huron water. The city of Flint would pay $2 million, and the Flint-based Charles Stewart Mott Foundation would pay $4 million. Jim Ananich, the State Senator representing Flint, demanded that the state refund the $2 million to the city. Ananich also requested further emergency funding from the state and long-term funding to address the effects of the lead contamination. On March 2, 2016, Michigan declared that returning to the Detroit water system must be approved by the state. When approved, the city was granted an emergency loan of $7 million. On September 27, 2016, Flint officials announced that the city will continue to use Detroit water until a new stretch of pipeline is constructed and the Flint River is tested and treated by the KWA.

From August 2015 to November 2016, median water lead levels began to go down again depending on the type of water service pipes each home had. In homes with copper pipes, the median water lead level dropped from 3.0 micrograms per liter (μg/L) to <1 μg/L; galvanized steel service lines dropped from a median water lead level of 7.2 μg/L to 1.9 μg/L, and lead service lines dropped from a median water lead level of 9.9 μg/L to 2.3 μg/L. 1 μg/L is equivalent to 1 part per billion. On December 9, 2016, the MDEQ reported that more than 96 percent of water samples in Flint residencies were below the EPA lead threshold of 15 ppb. On March 15, 2017, the Genesee County Water and Waste Services Advisory Board voted to construct a new pipeline; it would be a 7-mile (11 km), 42-inch (110 cm) connector to the KWA pipeline. The pipeline would allow the treatment of raw Lake Huron water, so the city of Flint could continue to buy pre-treated water from the Great Lakes Water Authority. The $12 million project will allow Flint to remain a customer of the GLWA until at least 2019.

== Lead exposure findings ==
In January 2015, a public meeting was held, where citizens complained about the "bad water". Residents complained about the taste, smell, and appearance of the water for 18 months before a Flint physician found elevated blood lead levels in the children of Flint. During that time period, MDEQ had insisted the water was safe to drink. A study by Virginia Tech researchers (see section below) determined that the river water, which, due to higher chloride concentration, is more corrosive than the lake water, was leaching lead from aging pipes. Mozhgan Savabieasfahani, an environmental toxicologist based in Ann Arbor, said this level of lead exposure is comparable with what the Iraqi people have experienced since the U.S. occupation in 2003.

While the local outcry about Flint water quality was growing in early 2015, Flint water officials filed papers with state regulators purporting to show that "tests at Flint's water treatment plant had detected no lead and testing in homes had registered lead at acceptable levels." The documents falsely claim that the city had tested tap water from homes with lead service lines, and therefore the highest lead-poisoning risks; however, the city did not know the locations of lead service lines, which city officials acknowledged in November 2015 after the Flint Journal/MLive published an article revealing the practice, using documents obtained under the Michigan Freedom of Information Act. The Journal/MLive reported that the city had "disregarded federal rules requiring it to seek out homes with lead plumbing for testing, potentially leading the city and state to underestimate for months the extent of toxic lead leaching into Flint's tap water."

In a report released on March 1, 2016, 37 of the 423 recently tested sentinel sites had results above the 15 ppb limit. Eight of the samples exceeded 100 ppb. A 2017 study showed that significantly more samples exceeded the 15 ppb limit in the voluntary or homeowner-driven sampling program whereby concerned citizens decided to acquire a testing kit and conduct sampling on their own (non-sentinel sites).

According to the U.S. Centers for Disease Control and Prevention (CDC), lead poisoning has long-lasting and often fatal effects, and there is no safe level of lead exposure in water that people can consume. Lead is dangerous given that it can harm almost all of the body's organs, even at doses as low as just five parts per billion. Children are especially at risk, as exposure can end up in anemia, declined growth, hyperactivity, behavioral and learning issues, and even more.

== Studies ==
=== Hurley Medical Center study I (2015) ===
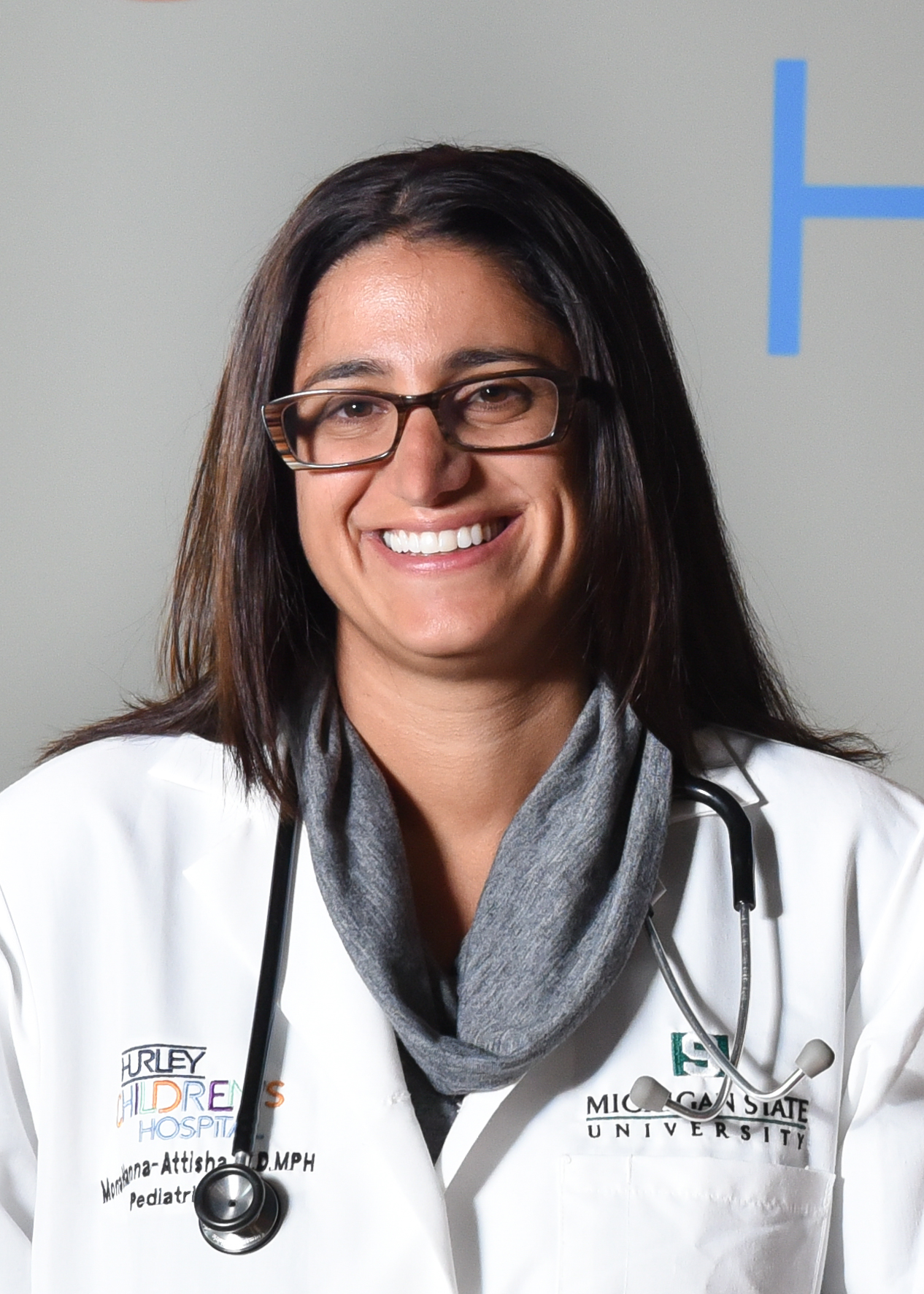
Mona Hanna-Attisha led the first Hurley Medical Center lead poisoning study.

On September 24, 2015, Hurley Medical Center in Flint released a study led by Mona Hanna-Attisha, the program director for pediatric residency at Hurley Children's Hospital, confirming that the proportion of infants and children with elevated levels of lead in their blood had nearly doubled since the city switched from the Detroit water system to using the Flint River as its water source. Using hospital records, Hanna-Attisha found that a steep rise in blood-lead levels corresponded to the city's switch in water sources. The study was initially dismissed by MDEQ spokesman Brad Wurfel, who repeated a familiar refrain: "Repeated testing indicated the water tested within acceptable levels." Later, Wurfel apologized to Hanna-Attisha. The team's study appears in the February 2016 issue of American Journal of Public Health.

Hanna-Attisha's research found that the average proportion of Flint children with elevated blood-lead levels (above five micrograms per deciliter, or 5×10^{–6} grams per 100 milliliters of blood) rose from 2.4% (2013, before the change in water source) to 4.9% (2015, after the change in water source). In areas where water lead levels were considered high at ≥ 15 ppb, which is the maximum amount of lead allowed in water per the Safe Drinking Water Act Lead and Copper Rule, the average proportion of Flint children with elevated blood-lead levels rose from 4% to 10.6%. Michigan Childhood Lead Poisoning Prevention Program data agree an increase occurred, suggesting an increase from 2.2% of children (May 2013 – April 2014) to 3.0% (May 2014 – April 2015). Hanna-Attisha's data were taken from hospital laboratory records for children less than five years old.

Hanna-Attisha's sample numbers were large, both for the pre-switch and post-switch time periods and for Flint children (1,473) and for children not exposed to Flint water (2,202). Demographics were meaningfully different among the two groups. In terms of race, 24.4% of the children outside of Flint were African American, while 76.8% of the children in areas of high water lead levels (≥ 15 ppb) were African American, and 67.0% of the children in areas of lower water lead levels (< 15 ppb) were African American. Children outside of Flint had a younger average age (1.86 years) compared to areas inside Flint (2.04–2.09 years). Socioeconomic status also represented a meaningful difference with children inside of Flint being more disadvantaged than those children who lived outside of Flint. In conclusion, the study demonstrated that elevated lead levels in children's blood was correlated with elevated lead levels in Flint water. Because lead screening is not completed for all children, such data may be skewed toward higher-risk children and thus overestimate lead exposure, especially in non–high-risk areas.

Hanna-Attisha and Flint resident LeeAnne Walters were awarded PEN America's Freedom of Expression Courage Award on May 16, 2016.

=== Hurley Medical Center study II (2018) ===
In June 2018 the Journal of Pediatrics published a much expanded study of blood lead levels measured at Hurley Medical Center. The original 2015 study of Hurley records involved a total of 1,473 children "younger than 5 years" whose address could be mapped to a site inside Flint in two pre/post 8.5 month periods. The 2018 study, led by Hernán F. Gómez, involved 15,817 children "aged ≤ 5 years" over the 11-year period 2006–2016. Data for 2012–2016 were available from center's Epic EMR system; records for earlier years were scrounged from legacy systems. The results show an increase in the fraction of children with elevated lead blood levels immediately pre/post the water switch (from 2.2% to 3.7%); invoking a Bonferroni correction, Gómez argues the change is not statistically significant. These results are consistent with a CDC report which found that the fraction of "all children under age 6" with elevated lead blood level "was nearly 50 percent higher after the switch to Flint River water". The striking result of Gómez et al. however is that during the 11-year period, the "crisis years" are actually the third and fourth lowest years for lead blood levels. That is, the upward blip during the water switch sits on a rapid declining curve (presumably because of the many lead mitigation projects that have been initiated nationally) so that blood lead levels during the crisis are actually lower than those two years earlier.

=== Virginia Tech water study ===
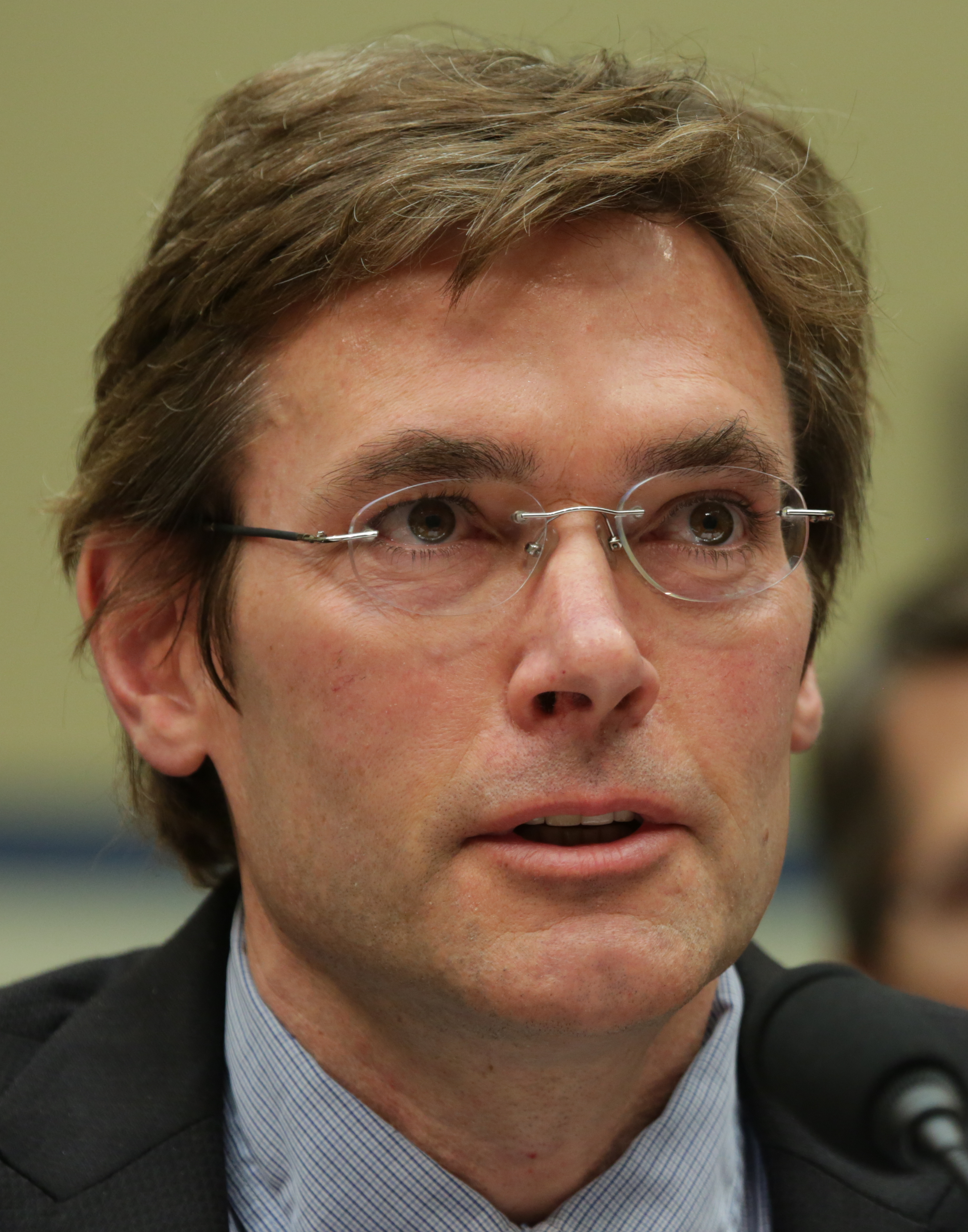
Marc Edwards led the first Virginia Tech Flint water study.

In September 2015 a team from Virginia Tech arrived in Flint. Led by Marc Edwards, an expert on municipal water quality, the team came to perform lead level testing on the Flint water supply, working under a National Science Foundation grant. Edwards had been contacted by Flint resident LeeAnne Walters, whose family had extreme health problems almost immediately following the switch to the Flint River water. Walters had attempted to act locally, but she was repeatedly ignored by city, state, and EPA officials. The study found that Flint water was "very corrosive" and "causing lead contamination in homes". It concluded in its report that "Flint River water leaches more lead from plumbing than does Detroit water. This is creating a public health threat in some Flint homes that have lead pipe or lead solder."

Edwards was shocked by the extent of the contamination, but even more so by the inaction of the proper authorities after being made well aware of the contamination. Edwards and his team found that at least a quarter of Flint households had levels of lead above the federal level of 15 ppb and that in some homes, lead levels were at 13,200 ppb. Edwards said, "It was the injustice of it all and that the very agencies that are paid to protect these residents from lead in water, knew or should've known after June at the very very latest of this year, that federal law was not being followed in Flint, and that these children and residents were not being protected. And the extent to which they went to cover this up exposes a new level of arrogance and uncaring that I have never encountered." Edwards' team created a website called Flint Water Study, with the main purposes of informing, and creating support for, Flint residents during the crisis. The site also summarized study results and became a comprehensive public database for all information related to the study.

On January 11, 2016, the Virginia Tech research team led by Edwards announced that it had completed its work. Edwards said, "We now feel that Flint's kids are finally on their way to being protected and decisive actions are under way to ameliorate the harm that was done." Edwards credited the Michigan ACLU and the group Water You Fighting For with doing the "critical work of collecting and coordinating" many water samples analyzed by the Virginia Tech team. Although the labor of the team (composed of scientists, investigators, graduate students, and undergraduates) was free, the investigation still spent more than $180,000 for such expenses as water testing and payment of Michigan Freedom of Information Act costs. A GoFundMe campaign has raised over $116,000 of the $150,000 needed for the team to recover its costs. On January 27, the city of Flint retained Edwards to monitor the city's water testing efforts.

On March 1, 2016, the Virginia Tech team was given $80,000 from an EPA grant to re-test the lead levels in 271 Flint homes. On August 11, 2016, Kelsey Pieper, a member of Edwards' research team, said 45 percent of residents that collected samples in July for the lead testing program had no detectable level of particulate lead in their water supply. She added the study yielded a lead reading of 13.9 ppb, just below the federal action level of 15 ppb. However, Pieper acknowledged the sampling, which was conducted by volunteer residents, does not fulfill the testing requirements of the federal Lead and Copper Rule. State testing of the most-recent six month monitoring period, which began January 1 and complied with Lead and Copper Rule regulations, showed a 90th percentile lead reading of 20 ppb, which exceeds the federal action level. Roughly 93 percent of samples from the third round of expanded state sentinel site testing showed results below the lead action level. Edwards called the results the "beginning of the end" of the public health disaster associated with the water crisis. On December 2, 2016, Edwards said lead was not detected in 57 percent of 154 Flint homes tested in November 2016 – up from 44 percent in July 2016. He also advised people to continue using filters.

=== Other test results ===
On January 24, 2017, the MDEQ told Mayor Weaver that the lead content of Flint water had fallen below the federal limit. The 90th percentile of lead concentrations in Flint was 12 ppb from July 2016 through December 2016—below the "action level" of 15 ppb. It was 20 ppb in the prior six-month period. On the next day, Flint spokeswoman Kristin Moore said that anywhere from 18,000 to 28,000 homes in the city still needed service lines replaced, and that the city was planning to complete 6,000 homes per year through 2019.

On March 7, 2017, MDEQ reported that Flint water sampled in February registered below the federal threshold for lead with 90 percent of samples at or below 8 ppb. February's water tests marked the seventh straight month in which city water was below the action level. February's testing also showed 95.8 percent of samples taken at homes at risk of high lead levels were at or below 15 ppb. On June 9, 2017, the MDEQ reported their May 2017 testing showed 90 percent of Tier I samples at or below 6 ppb of lead with 93.1 percent of the samples at or below 15 ppb.

On April 23, 2019, Status Coup released the documentary Flushing Flint which claimed that the water testing conducted by MDEQ was falsified by MDEQ staff taking water samples after flushing running water from taps for several minutes before taking the samples, contrary to normal procedures for water testing, and by MDEQ staff telling residents that they should take water samples after flushing running water from their taps for several minutes. This would clearly contravene the EPA guidance that samples taken must be "first-draw samples at taps in homes/buildings". These claims cast doubt on the MDEQ reports of improvements in water quality over previous years.

== Possible link to Legionnaires' disease spike ==
On January 13, 2016, Snyder said that 87 cases of Legionnaires' disease, a waterborne disease, were reported in Genesee County from June 2014 – November 2015, resulting in 12 deaths (two more people later died from the disease). Although the Michigan Department of Health and Human Services (MDHHS) said that there is no evidence of a clear link between the spike in cases and the water system change, Edwards stated the contaminated Flint water could be linked to the spike. In a second report released January 21, state researchers had still not pin-pointed the source of the outbreak. The next day, an official at McLaren Regional Medical Center in Flint confirmed that there was a spike in Legionella cases in Flint and elsewhere in Genesee County, but noted that there was "no definitive data to support that McLaren Flint is the source of exposure for any patient testing positive for the Legionella antigen." The family of one of the people who died of Legionnaires filed a $100 million lawsuit against McLaren.

The Flint Journal obtained documents via the Michigan Freedom of Information Act on the Legionnaires' outbreak and published an article on them on January 16, 2016. The documents indicated that on October 17, 2014, employees of the Genesee County Health Department and the Flint water treatment plant met to discuss the county's "concerns regarding the increase in Legionella cases and possible association with the municipal water system." By early October 2014, officials at MDEQ were aware of a possible link between the water in Flint and the Legionnaires' outbreak, but the public was never informed, and the agency gave assurances about water safety in public statements and at public forums. An internal email on January 27, 2015, from a supervisor at the health department said that the Flint water treatment plant had not responded in months to "multiple written and verbal requests" for information.

In January 2015, following a breakdown in communication between the city and the county on the Legionnaires' investigation, the county filed a FOIA request with the city, seeking "specific water testing locations and laboratory results ... for coliform, E-coli, heterotrophic bacteria and trihalomethanes" and other information. In April 2015, the county health department contacted the CDC, and in April 2015 a CDC employee wrote in an email that the Legionnaires' outbreak was "very large, one of the largest we know of in the past decade and community-wide, and in our opinion and experience it needs a comprehensive investigation." However, MDHHS told the county health department at the time that federal assistance was not necessary.

Emails obtained by Progress Michigan in February 2016 indicate Snyder's office knew about the outbreak since March 2015, despite Snyder's claim he was only informed in January 2016. On March 11, 2016, Governor Snyder ordered an investigation of the MDHHS regarding the outbreak. On February 16, 2017, the CDC discovered the first genetic links between city water and patients diagnosed with Legionnaires' disease in Genesee County. "The presence of Legionella in Flint was widespread," said Janet Stout, a research associate professor at the University of Pittsburgh and a national expert on the disease. "The (laboratory) results show that strains (of the bacteria) were throughout the water system." Virginia Tech researcher Amy Pruden published a study that found Legionella levels up to 1,000 times higher than normal tap water in Flint, and said finding a patient whose clinical isolates—or bacteria—matched the McLaren water sample without having been hospitalized there "suggests that same strain may have been elsewhere."

On March 10, 2017, affidavits filed by experts in court supported the conclusion that Flint water was connected to the Legionnaires' disease outbreak. Janet Stout wrote in an affidavit: "(It) is my opinion to a reasonable degree of probability that the source water change and the subsequent management of the municipal water system caused conditions to develop within the municipal water distribution system that promoted Legionella growth and dispersion, amplification, and the significant increases in cases of Legionnaires' disease in Genesee County in 2014 and 2015." J. David Krause, director of Forensic Analytical Consulting Services, and Hung K. Cheung, a doctor specializing in environmental and occupational medicine agreed with her claims.

On February 5, 2018, a study published in the journals Proceedings of the National Academy of Sciences and mBio concluded that the 2014–2015 outbreak of Legionnaires' disease in Flint was caused by low levels of chlorine which, at higher levels, would have made it difficult for bacteria to replicate. Because chlorine reacts with heavy metals like lead and iron, high levels of both in Flint's water may have been responsible for the decreased amount of chlorine available. On December 4, 2019, research institute KWR from the Netherlands published the results of their re-investigation of the outbreak in Environmental Health Perspectives. They found evidence for three sources: strong evidence for exposure to a Flint hospital in 2014 and 2015 for 42 of 86 confirmed cases, and weaker evidence for exposure to city water at home or living in the proximity of a specific cluster of cooling towers, both only in 2014. Each source could be associated with only a proportion of cases. They concluded that focus on a single source may have delayed recognition and remediation of other significant sources of L. pneumophila and provided recommendations to improve Legionella prevention.

== Inquiries, investigations, resignations, and release of documents ==
One focus of inquiry is when Snyder became aware of the issue, and how much he knew about it. In a July 2015 email, Dennis Muchmore (Snyder's chief of staff) wrote to a Michigan Department of Health and Human Services (MDHHS) official, "I'm frustrated by the water issue in Flint. I really don't think people are getting the benefit of the doubt. These folks are scared and worried about the health impacts and they are basically getting blown off by us (as a state we're just not sympathizing with their plight)." In a separate email sent on July 22, 2015, MDHHS local health services director Mark Miller wrote to colleagues that it "Sounds like the issue is old lead service lines." These emails were obtained under the Michigan Freedom of Information Act by Virginia Tech researchers studying the crisis and were released to the public in the first week of January 2016.

In October 2015, it was reported that the city government's data on lead water lines in the city was stored on 45,000 index cards (some dating back a century) located in filing cabinets in Flint's public utility building. The Department of Public Works said that it was trying to transition the data into an electronic spreadsheet program, but as of October 1, 2015, only about 25% of the index card information had been digitized. On October 21, 2015, Snyder announced the creation of a five-member Flint Water Advisory Task Force, consisting of Ken Sikkema of Public Sector Consultants and Chris Kolb of the Michigan Environmental Council (co-chairs) and Matthew Davis of the University of Michigan Health System, Eric Rothstein of the Galardi Rothstein Group and Lawrence Reynolds of Mott Children's Health Center in Flint. On December 29, 2015, the Task Force released its preliminary report, saying that MDEQ bore ultimate blame for the Flint water crisis.

The task force wrote that the MDEQ's Office of Drinking Water and Municipal Assistance adopted a "minimalist technical compliance approach" to water safety, which was "unacceptable and simply insufficient to the task of public protection". The task force also found that "Throughout 2015, as the public raised concerns and as independent studies and testing were conducted and brought to the attention of MDEQ, the agency's response was often one of aggressive dismissal, belittlement, and attempts to discredit these efforts and the individuals involved. We find both the tone and substance of many MDEQ public statements to be completely unacceptable." The task force also found that MDEQ has failed to follow the federal Lead and Copper Rule. That rule requires "optimized corrosion control treatment", but MDEQ staff instructed city of Flint water treatment staff that corrosion control treatment (CCT) would not be necessary for a year. The task force found that "the decision not to require CCT, made at the direction of the MDEQ, led directly to the contamination of the Flint water system". The Flint Water Advisory Task Force's final report, released March 21, 2016, found the MDEQ, MDHHS, Governor's office, and the state-appointed emergency managers "fundamentally accountable" for the crisis, saying the people of Flint were "needlessly and tragically" exposed to toxic levels of lead and other hazards. The task force's findings prompted the resignation of MDEQ director Dan Wyant and communications director Brad Wurfel. Flint Department of Public Works director Howard Croft also resigned.

On January 8, 2016, the U.S. Attorney's Office for the Eastern District of Michigan said that it was investigating. A month later, they said they were working with the Federal Bureau of Investigation, the EPA's Office of Inspector General, the EPA's Criminal Investigation Division, and the Postal Inspection Service on the investigation. The EPA "battled Michigan's Department of Environmental Quality behind the scenes for at least six months over whether Flint needed to use chemical treatments to keep lead lines and plumbing connections from leaching into drinking water" and "did not publicize its concern that Flint residents' health was jeopardized by the state's insistence that such controls were not required by law". In 2015, EPA water expert Miguel A. Del Toral "identified potential problems with Flint's drinking water in February, confirmed the suspicions in April and summarized the looming problem" in an internal memo circulated on June 24, 2015. Despite these "dire warnings" from Del Toral, the memo was not publicly released until November 2015, after a revision and vetting process. In the interim, the EPA and MDEQ engaged in a dispute on how to interpret the Lead and Copper Rule. According to EPA administrator Susan Hedman, the EPA pushed to immediately implement corrosion controls in the interests of public health, while MDEQ sought to delay a decision on corrosion control until two six-month periods of sampling had been completed. Meanwhile, Wurfel called Del Toral a "rogue employee" for his whistle-blowing efforts. Marc Edwards, who investigated the lead contamination, wrote that Del Toral had made a "heroic effort" that was stymied by the EPA and MDEQ spending months "wrangling over jurisdiction, technicalities and legalities".

In an interview with the Detroit News published on January 12, 2016, Hedman said that "the recommendation to DEQ (regarding the need for corrosion controls) occurred at higher and higher levels during this time period. And the answer kept coming back from DEQ that 'no, we are not going to make a decision until after we see more testing results'". Hedman said the EPA did not go public with its concerns earlier because (1) state and local governments have primary responsibility for drinking water quality and safety; (2) there was insufficient evidence at that point of the extent of the danger; and (3) the EPA's legal authority to compel the state to take action was unclear, and the EPA discussed the issue with its legal counsel, who only rendered an opinion in November. Hedman said the EPA discussed the issue with its legal counsel and urged the state to have MDHHS warn residents about the danger. On January 21, Hedman's resignation (effective February 1) was accepted.

Assessments of the EPA's action varied. Edwards said that the assessment in Del Toral's original June memo was "100 percent accurate" and criticized the EPA for failing to take more immediate action. State Senate Minority Leader Jim Ananich, Democrat of Flint, said, "There's been a failure at all levels to accurately assess the scale of the public health crisis in Flint, and that problem is ongoing. However, the EPA's Miguel Del Toral did excellent work in trying to expose this disaster. Anyone who read his memo and failed to act should be held accountable to the fullest extent of the law." Del Toral later told The Flint Journal, "I was stunned when I found out they did not have corrosion control in place. In my head, I didn't believe that. I thought: That can't be true ... that's so basic." He also confirmed that unfiltered Flint water is still unsafe to drink, and did not know when that would change.

On January 15, 2016, Michigan Attorney General Bill Schuette announced that his office would open an investigation into the crisis, saying the situation in Flint "is a human tragedy in which families are struggling with even the most basic parts of daily life". To oversee his office's probe, Schuette appointed Todd Flood as special prosecutor and Andrew Arena as chief investigator, who led a team of nine full-time investigators. At a media roundtable in February 2016, Flood said that the investigation could result in involuntary manslaughter charges, if there was gross negligence leading to a death. Critics have questioned the objectivity of the investigation.

In his annual State of the State address on January 19, 2016, Snyder announced that he would release all of his emails from 2014 and 2015 regarding the crisis. The following day, the governor's office released 274 pages of emails. The New York Times summarized, "the documents provide a glimpse of state leaders who were at times dismissive of the concerns of residents, seemed eager to place responsibility with local government and, even as the scientific testing was hinting at a larger problem, were reluctant to acknowledge it." Later that month in a class action lawsuit related to the crisis, Snyder and the MDEQ were served subpoenas for the release of additional emails dating back to the beginning of 2011. Emails highlighted by Progress Michigan in January 2016 indicate that Michigan state officials were trucking in bottled water to some of their own employees stationed in Flint as early as January 2015 in regards to the unsafe levels of trihalomethanes.

On January 22, 2016, two MDEQ employees (Liane Shekter Smith, former chief of the department's Office of Drinking Water and Municipal Assistance; and Steve Busch, former district supervisor in the division) were suspended, pending an investigation, as a result of questions regarding actions related to water testing in Flint. In response, Snyder said, "Michiganders need to be able to depend on state government to do what's best for them and in the case of the DEQ that means ensuring their drinking water is safe. Some DEQ actions lacked common sense and that resulted in this terrible tragedy in Flint. I look forward to the results of the investigation to ensure these mistakes don't happen again." Smith was fired on February 5, 2016.

On January 25, 2016, the Genesee County Commission approved a request from Genesee County Prosecuting Attorney David Leyton for $25,000 to conduct an investigation into the crisis. The money will be used to hire two special prosecutors. On February 12, 2016, Governor Snyder released additional emails between his office and the MDEQ which about the Legionnaires' outbreak. On February 26, Snyder's office released several thousand more emails regarding the crisis that date back to 2011. An additional batch of emails was released on March 10. On March 4, 2016, a report released by the Michigan Auditor General's office called the MDEQ's Office of Drinking Water and Municipal Assistance "not sufficient" in its oversight of the state's Community Water Supply Program.

On July 13, 2016, the Mackinac Center for Public Policy sued MDEQ over the department's 121-day delay in responding to Freedom of Information Act (FOIA) requests surrounding Flint, including a request for all emails from Shekter-Smith and Bush from 2013 through 2015 containing the word "Flint" and a list of "any employees transferred, reassigned, or suspended as a result of the Flint water issues". The case was settled in November 2017, with a joint statement saying in part, "The parties also note there are circumstances for which the FOIA currently lacks certainty when documents must be provided. This lack of clarity can foster litigation over what response times are reasonable."

On April 16, 2020, an article was published giving details of evidence of corruption and a coverup by Snyder and his "fixer" Rich Baird, and stating that the statute of limitations on some of the most serious felony misconduct-in-office charges would expire on April 25, 2020. Responses from Michigan state authorities denied that a deadline was approaching and said that criminal prosecutions would follow.

== Legislative hearings ==
=== Federal ===
On January 14, 2016, U.S. Representative Brenda Lawrence formally requested congressional hearings on the crisis, saying: "We trust our government to protect the health and safety of our communities, and this includes the promise of clean water to drink." The House Committee on Oversight and Government Reform began their hearings on the crisis on February 3. U.S. Representative Dan Kildee from Flint gave an opening statement. The first witnesses were EPA acting deputy assistant administrator Joel Beauvais, Marc Edwards, new MDEQ Director Keith Creagh, and Flint resident LeeAnne Walters (who alerted EPA water expert Miguel A. Del Toral to the problem).

On March 15, the House Oversight and Government Reform Committee examining the Flint water crisis revealed the EPA, state, and municipal officials attempted to fix the situation behind the scenes according to hearing witness and former EPA regional administrator, Susan Hedman, who cited legal and enforcement challenges as the causes for her actions. Ex-Emergency Financial Manager Darnell Earley, Former Fint Mayor Dayne Walling, and Professor Marc Edwards also testified on that date's hearing. Governor Snyder and EPA Administrator Gina McCarthy testified before that committee on March 17.

On February 10, 2016, a separate committee, the U.S. House Democratic Steering and Policy Committee, held a hearing on the crisis in which Hurley Medical Center pediatrician Mona Hanna-Attisha; Yanna Lambrinidou, president of Parents for Nontoxic Alternatives, an environmental health group; Flint schools Superintendent Bilal Kareem Tawwab; Eric Scorsone, an expert in local government finances from Michigan State University, and Mayor Karen Weaver testified. On April 13, 2016, the U.S. House of Representatives Subcommittee on Environment and the Economy and Energy Subcommittee on Health held a joint hearing on the crisis in which Keith Creagh of MDEQ, Nick Lyon from the Michigan Department of Health and Human Services, and Mona Hanna-Attisha of Hurley Medical Center testified.

=== State ===
On February 23, 2016, the Michigan State Legislature started a committee to investigate the crisis. On March 1, one of its members, Senator Jim Ananich of Flint, introduced a resolution that would grant state lawmakers probing the Flint water crisis subpoena power over the governor's office, which is immune to the state Freedom of Information Act. The committee's first hearing was on March 15, 2016. On March 29, 2016, the state's Joint Committee on the Flint Water Public Health Emergency held a hearing on the crisis in Flint during which residents and local experts testified.

== State of emergency and emergency responses ==
=== Local ===
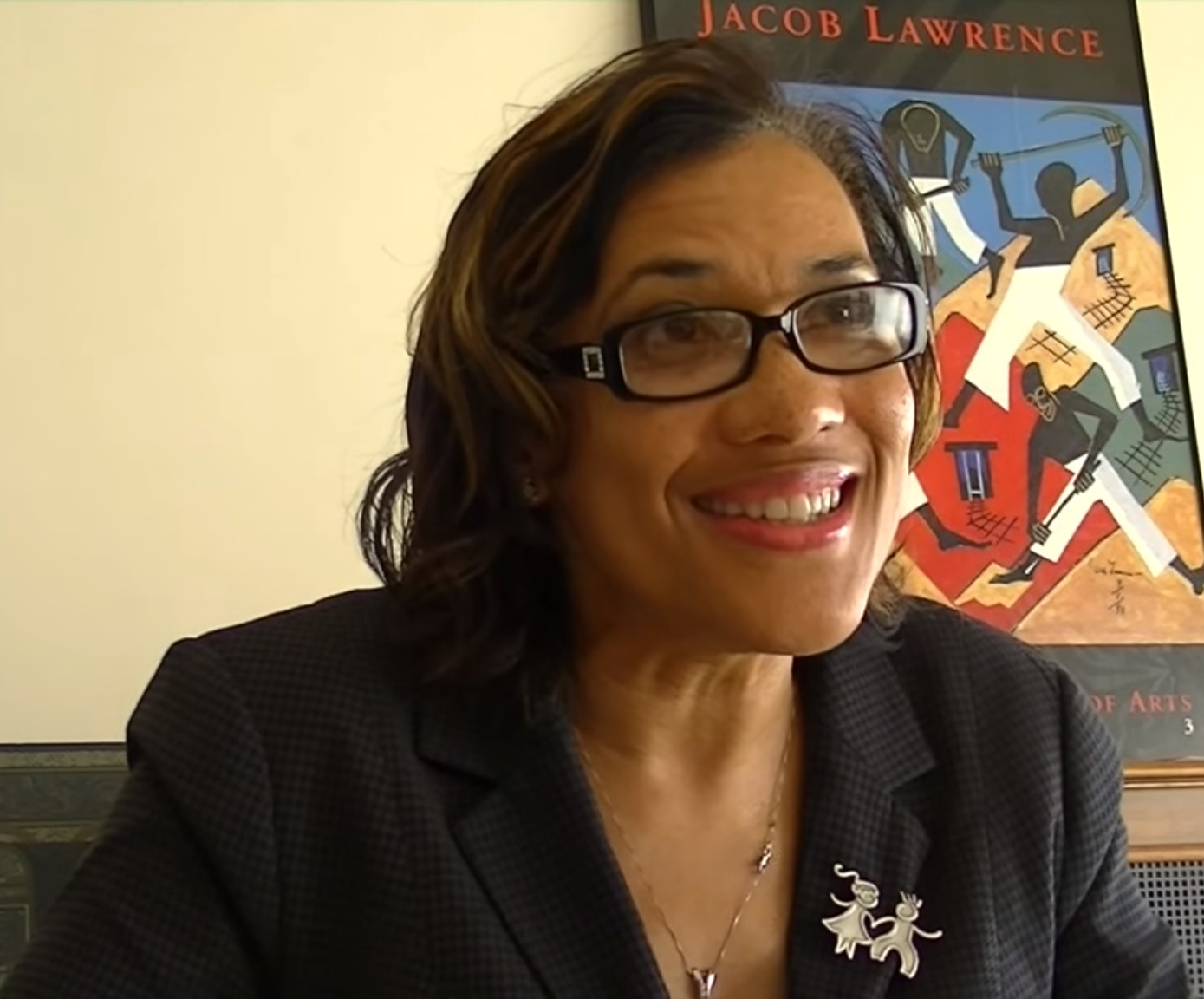
Mayor Karen Weaver declared the city to be in a state of emergency on December 15, 2015.

On December 15, 2015, Mayor Weaver declared the water issue as a citywide public health state of emergency to prompt help from state and federal officials. Weaver's declaration said that additional funding will be needed for special education, mental health, juvenile justice, and social services because of the behavioral and cognitive impacts of high blood lead levels. It was subsequently declared a countywide emergency by the Genesee County Board of Commissioners.

Starting on January 7, 2016, Genesee County Sheriff Robert Pickell had work crews of offenders sentenced to community service begin delivering bottled water, water filters and replacement cartridges, primarily to residents living in homes built between 1901 and 1920, whose plumbing systems were most likely leaching lead into the water. The next week, he ordered his department to begin using reverse 911 to advise homebound residents on how to get help.

On January 10, Mayor Weaver stressed to residents that it was important to also pick up the testing kits, as the city would like to receive at least 500 water test samples per week. On January 12, officers from the Michigan State Police and Genesee County Sheriff's Department started delivering cases of water, water filters, lead testing kits and replacement cartridges to residents who needed them. The American Red Cross has also been deployed to Flint to deliver bottled water and filters to residents.

On January 14, it was announced that Mona Hanna-Attisha would lead a Flint Pediatric Public Health Initiative that includes experts from the Michigan State University College of Human Medicine, Hurley Children's Hospital, the Genesee County Health Department, and the Michigan Department of Health and Human Services to help Flint children diagnosed with lead poisoning.

=== State ===
On January 5, 2016, Governor Snyder declared Genesee County to be in a state of emergency. On January 6, Snyder ordered the Michigan Emergency Operations Center, operated by the Michigan State Police Emergency Management and Homeland Security Division, to open a Joint Information Center to coordinate public outreach and field questions from the residents about the problems caused by the crisis. The State Emergency Operations Center recommended that all Flint children under six years old get tested for lead levels as soon as possible, either by a primary care physician or the Genesee County Health Department. They also advised residents to call the United Way to receive additional help if needed.

On January 11, Snyder signed an executive order creating a new committee to "work on long-term solutions to the Flint water situation and ongoing public health concerns affecting residents". On January 13, Snyder activated the Michigan Army National Guard to assist the American Red Cross. On January 27, Snyder announced the establishment of the new 17-member Flint Water Interagency Coordinating Committee to "make recommendations regarding the health and welfare of people exposed to lead, study Flint's water infrastructure and determine potential upgrades, review Flint Water Task Force recommendations, and establish ways to improve communication between local and state government". On March 2, Snyder announced the state would partner with the employment agency Michigan Works! Association to hire 81 Flint residents to work at water distribution sites throughout the city. On March 21, Governor Snyder released a 75-point relief plan for addressing the crisis, which includes programs in the fields of health and human services, education, water supply and infrastructure replacements, and jobs and economic development. On April 6, the state began offering up to $100,000 in grant money from the Disaster and Emergency Contingency Fund to local governments affected by the water crisis.

On March 16, 2017, Governor Snyder created the Child Lead Exposure Elimination Commission and appointed Mona Hanna-Attisha of Flint's Hurley Medical Center, Rebecca Meuninck of Ann Arbor, deputy director of the Ecology Center; Paul Haan of Grand Rapids, executive director of the Healthy Homes Coalition of West Michigan, Inc.; and Lyke Thompson of Ann Arbor, director of the Center for Urban Studies at Wayne State University as its members. "Eliminating the risk of child lead exposure will require the coordination and expertise of people across all sectors", Snyder said in the announcement. "Creating this permanent commission will help advance the strategies recommended to better protect Michigan children from lead exposure." On the same day, Governor Snyder said he will lower Michigan's "action level" from 15 ppb to 10 ppb. Snyder sent $28 million to Flint for supplies, medical care, and infrastructure upgrades and later budgeted an additional $30 million to Flint to provide water bill credits of 65% for residents and 20% for businesses. Another $165 million for lead pipe replacements and water bill reimbursements was approved by Snyder on June 29, 2016. On January 6, 2017, Snyder signed a bill that accelerated the public notice requirement for lead in drinking water to three business days, from the previous time of 30 days.

=== Federal ===
On January 9, 2016, the Federal Emergency Management Agency (FEMA) sent two liaison officers to the Michigan Emergency Operations Center to work with the state to monitor the situation. On January 15, Snyder asked President Obama to grant a federal emergency/major disaster designation for Genesee County, seeking federal financial aid for emergency assistance and infrastructure repair in order to "protect the health, safety and welfare of Flint residents". The following day, Obama signed an emergency declaration giving Flint up to $5 million in federal aid to handle the crisis. FEMA released a statement that said:

The President's action authorizes the Department of Homeland Security, Federal Emergency Management Agency (FEMA), to coordinate all disaster relief efforts which have the purpose of alleviating the hardship and suffering caused by the emergency on the local population, and to provide appropriate assistance for required emergency measures, authorized under Title V of the Stafford Act, to save lives and to protect property and public health and safety, and to lessen or avert the threat of a catastrophe in Genesee County. FEMA is authorized to provide equipment and resources to alleviate the impacts of the emergency. Emergency protective measures, limited to direct federal assistance, will be provided at 75 percent federal funding. This emergency assistance is to provide water, water filters, water filter cartridges, water test kits, and other necessary related items for a period of no more than 90 days.

After Snyder's request for a "Major Disaster Declaration" status was turned down, FEMA Administrator W. Craig Fugate wrote a letter to Snyder saying that the water contamination "does not meet the legal definition of a 'major disaster'" under federal law because "[t]he incident was not the result of a natural catastrophe, nor was it created by a fire, flood or explosion." In response, Snyder asked Obama for emergency funding under FEMA's Individuals and Households Program, which provides housing assistance and replacement of personal property. He will also ask for money and emergency protective measures, according to the release. On March 3, 2016, Governor Snyder filed a second appeal for federal help to replace lead pipes and provide medical support and supplies for affected residents which said the estimated economic impact of the Flint water crisis is beginning to exceed $140 million. FEMA rejected his request again on March 16.

The EPA issued a Safe Drinking Water Act Emergency Order and took over collecting and testing of water samples, while ordering state agencies to send them previously collected data, on January 21. A week later they advised residents to continue using water filters and drink only bottled water. On February 12, the USDA extended their nutrition programs for Flint children diagnosed with high blood lead levels. On the next day, Governor Snyder asked for additional help from Medicaid and the State Children's Health Insurance Program for affected Flint children. The Department of Health and Human Services granted his request on February 18, providing an additional $500,000 in Medicaid expansion for affected Flint children and pregnant women. On March 3, a waiver request to include pregnant women and people up to 21 years of age was approved. On March 1, the U.S. Department of Health and Human Services announced plans to expand its Head Start Program to more Flint children affected by the crisis. On March 23, the U.S. Department of Labor announced up to $15 million in National Dislocated Worker Grants will help provide temporary jobs to assist with Flint's water crisis recovery. About 400 temporary jobs at water distribution centers throughout the city will be created through the grant. The workers will take the place of the Michigan National Guard soldiers who have been in place since January.

On March 25, 2016, the EPA and FEMA extended the federal emergency until August 14, 2016. The state took over the emergency response after that date. A $170 million stopgap spending bill for repairing and upgrading the city of Flint's water system and helping with healthcare costs was approved by the U.S. House of Representatives on December 8, 2016. The Senate approved it the next day. $100 million of the bill is for infrastructure repairs, $50 million for healthcare costs, and $20 million to pay back loans related to the crisis.

== Criminal prosecutions ==
=== 2016 ===
On April 20, 2016, criminal charges were filed against three people in regards to the crisis by Michigan Attorney General Bill Schuette. Former MDEQ employees Michael Prysby and Stephen Busch are charged with misconduct in office, conspiracy to tamper with evidence, tampering with evidence, a treatment violation of the Michigan Safe Drinking Water Act, and a monitoring violation of the Federal Safe Drinking Water Act; former city water plant operator Michael Glasgow was charged with willful neglect of office, a misdemeanor, and felony tampering with evidence. On May 4, 2016, Glasgow accepted a plea deal with prosecutors, admitting to filing false information about lead in Flint water and agreeing to cooperate in other prosecutions. Exactly a year later, the case against Glasgow was dismissed, with prosecutors acknowledging his cooperation and the fact that he was the person who reported the crimes of his colleagues to the MDEQ.

On July 29, 2016, Schuette charged six additional people with crimes in the crisis, three from MDEQ and three from the MDHHS. From MDEQ, Liane Shekter-Smith was charged with misconduct in office and willful neglect of duty; Adam Rosenthal was charged with misconduct in office, conspiracy to tamper with evidence, tampering with evidence, and neglect; Adam Cook was charged with misconduct in office, conspiracy to engage in misconduct in office, and neglect of duty. From the MDHHS, Nancy Peeler, Corinne Miller, and Robert Scott were charged with misconduct in office, conspiracy to commit misconduct in office, and willful neglect of duty. MDEQ and MDHHS released a joint statement later that day indicating Peeler, Scott, Cook, and Rosenthal had been suspended without pay. Miller retired in April and Shekter-Smith was fired in February.

The cases were consolidated for preliminary hearing purposes on August 9, since the same witnesses were to testify against all defendants. On September 14, 2016, Miller pleaded no contest to the neglect of duty charge and agreed to testify against the other defendants. She was later sentenced to a year probation, 300 hours of community service, and fined $1,200. On December 20, 2016, Schuette filed false pretenses, conspiracy to commit false pretenses, willful neglect of duty and misconduct in office charges against former Emergency Managers Darnell Earley and Jerry Ambrose; and false pretenses and conspiracy to commit false pretenses charges against former Flint Utilities Administrator Daugherty Johnson and former Flint Department of Public Works Director Howard Croft. On November 28, 2017, Daugherty Johnson pleaded no contest to failing to furnish water documents to a Genesee County Health Department employee investigating a possible connection between Flint water and Legionnaires' disease outbreaks. Charges were dismissed in 2018 because of his cooperation with prosecutors.

=== 2017 ===
On June 14, 2017, Schuette announced new involuntary manslaughter charges—15-year felonies—against MDHHS Director Nick Lyon, former Flint emergency manager Darnell Earley, former Flint Department of Public Works director Howard Croft, former Michigan Department of Environmental Quality Office of Drinking Water chief Liane Shekter-Smith and MDEQ District Supervisor Stephen Busch. Also charged was Eden Wells, chief medical executive of MDHHS, who faces allegations of obstruction of justice and lying to a police officer. Lyon was also charged with a single count of misconduct in office after being accused of having received notice of the Legionnaires' outbreak at least a year before informing the public and the governor, while Wells is also accused of threatening to withhold funding to the Flint Area Community Health and Environment Partnership unless the partnership ceased its investigation into the source of the Legionnaires' outbreak. On October 9, 2017, Wells was charged with involuntary manslaughter and misconduct in office. On December 20, 2017, Adam Rosenthal pleaded no contest to a public records charge, a one-year misdemeanor, which was officially dismissed on September 27, 2018, following his cooperation in other prosecutions.

=== 2018 ===
On August 20, 2018, District Court Judge David Goggins found probable cause for a trial for two cases of involuntary manslaughter that were linked to Legionnaires Disease against Michigan's Health Director, Nick Lyon. On December 26, MDEQ employees Michael Prysby and Stephen Busch pleaded guilty to misdemeanors in exchange for their testimony against other defendants.

=== 2019 ===
On December 18, 2019, the cases against former MDEQ employees Steven Busch and Michael Prysby were dismissed by a Genesee County judge. Nine years after Flint's disastrous water switch, prosecutors say no one will stand trial for their role in the city's government-caused water crisis. State prosecutors conceded that they had no viable path forward, effectively dismissing the investigations. Legal experts pointed to a series of missteps by Attorney General Dana Nessel's team, complicating an already challenging prosecution. The conclusion of the investigation left many in Flint disheartened yet unsurprised. Kevin Croom, the executive director of the Asbury Community Development Corporation in Flint, expressed the sentiment shared by many: "It's a slow-walk slap in the face. Lives were lost, and it's just like, 'Deal with it, it happened, go on with your life.'"

=== 2020 ===
On January 8, 2020, a Genesee County judge dismissed a misdemeanor charge of disturbance of a lawful meeting against Liane Shekter-Smith. On April 16, 2020, an article was published giving details of evidence of corruption and a coverup by Governor Snyder and Rich Baird, and stating that the statute of limitations on some of the most serious felony misconduct-in-office charges would expire on April 25, 2020. Responses from Michigan state authorities denied that a deadline was approaching, and said that criminal prosecutions would follow.

=== 2021 ===
New criminal charges were filed against former governor Rick Snyder and eight other officials by the state of Michigan on January 13, 2021, for their roles in the water crisis seven years prior. Snyder facing two counts of willful neglect of duty that could lead to up to one year in prison and up to $1,000 in fines. The officials that were involved were charged with forty-two charges, both felonies and misdemeanors. Charges included; perjury, misconduct, obstruction of justice, extortion, neglect, involuntary manslaughter. The Flint water crisis led to the death of twelve individuals, and left more than 90 people sick by various diseases, including legionnaires' disease. This was due to the water going untreated from the river. Bacteria was able to make its way from the water into the homes of many surrounding families through the service lines. The charges stem from the decision to switch the water supply from the Detroit water system to the Flint River in 2014 as a cost-cutting measure without properly assessing the potential impact on residents' health.

=== 2022 ===
On June 28, 2022, the Michigan Supreme Court overturned the state's use of one-man grand juries to issue indictments in the Flint water criminal cases. In a unanimous decision, the state Supreme Court found that a one-judge grand jury can be used to investigate, subpoena and issue arrest warrants but it cannot be used to indict an individual.

=== 2023 ===
Following the state Supreme Court's rejection of an attempt to raise charges against former Governor Rick Snyder, Michigan Attorney General Dana Nessel's office announced the end of the pursuit of criminal charges related to the Flint water crisis after seven years without any convictions.

== Civil lawsuits ==
As of February 21, 2019, a total of 79 civil lawsuits have been filed in regards to the crisis.

=== 2015 ===
On November 13, 2015, four families filed a federal class-action lawsuit in the U.S. District Court for the Eastern District of Michigan in Detroit against Governor Snyder and thirteen other city and state officials, including Mayor Walling and Darnell Earley, who was in charge of the city when the switch to the Flint River was made. The complaint alleges that the officials acted recklessly and negligently, leading to serious injuries from lead poisoning, including autoimmune disorders, skin lesions, and "brain fog". The complaint alleges that the officials' conduct was "reckless and outrageous" and "shocks the conscience and was deliberately indifferent to ... constitutional rights." The case was dismissed on February 3, 2017, with the judge stating his court has lack of subject-matter jurisdiction in the matter. Their attorneys filed an appeal on February 6.

The legal doctrines of sovereign immunity (which protects the state from suit) and official immunity (which in Michigan shields top government officials from personal liability, even in cases of gross negligence) resulted in comparatively few lawsuits being filed in the Flint case, and caused large national plaintiffs' law firms to be reluctant to become involved with the case.

=== 2016 ===
On January 14, 2016, a separate class-action lawsuit against Snyder, the state of Michigan, the city of Flint, Earley, Walling, and Croft was filed by three Flint residents in Michigan Circuit Court in Genesee County. This suit targets lower-level officials who (under Michigan law) do not have immunity from claims arising from gross negligence. A separate suit was filed in January 2016 in the Michigan Court of Claims against the governor and state agencies; that suit alleges violations of the state constitution. In Michigan, the Court of Claims is the only court with subject-matter jurisdiction over claims against the state and its subdivisions.

A federal lawsuit filed on January 27, 2016, seeks the replacement of all lead service lines in Flint at no cost to residents following claims city and state leaders violated federal laws designed to protect drinking water. It is also asking the court to force city and state officials to provide safe drinking water to Flint residents and require them to follow federal regulations for testing and treating water to control for lead.

On February 2, 2016, a class action lawsuit in U.S. District Court was filed on behalf of Beatrice Boler, a Flint mother of two, Flint pastor Edwin Anderson with his wife, Alline Anderson, and a company, Epco Sales LLC. against Snyder, the MDEQ, two former state appointed emergency managers and Mayor Walling that seeks more than $150 million in refunds and compensation for damages for "water that was extraordinarily dangerous, undrinkable and unusable". It was dismissed on April 19, 2016, after the judge ruled the allegations fall under the federal Safe Drinking Water Act, which prevents challenges to the law being ruled on in U.S. District Court and states they must be addressed by the EPA, and the case should be re-filed in the Michigan Court of Claims. Also on February 2, a lawsuit was filed in Michigan Circuit Court on behalf of four Genesee County residents who contracted Legionnaires' disease during the Flint water crisis, including one woman who died seven days after entering the emergency room with a headache. The suit names McLaren Regional Medical Center and several MDEQ officials as defendants. Lawyer Geoffrey Fieger represents the plaintiffs.

On February 8, 2016, the parents of a two-year-old girl diagnosed with high blood lead levels filed a lawsuit in federal court, naming as defendants the city of Flint, the state of Michigan, Snyder, Earley, and Walling. The case was dismissed on February 7, 2017, with the judge citing his court has a lack of subject matter jurisdiction. On March 3, 2016, a lawsuit was filed in state court by LeeAnne Walters, the Flint mother who informed the EPA water expert Miguel Del Toral of the health problems her family experienced after the water switch, against multiple corporate entities and three current and former government employees for their role in the city's water crisis. On March 7, 2016, another class action lawsuit was filed on behalf of seven residents alleging that tens of thousands of residents have suffered physical and economic injuries and damages. It argues officials failed to take action over "dangerous levels of lead" in drinking water and "downplayed the severity of the contamination".

On March 8, 2016, a federal class action lawsuit was filed on behalf of over 500 county inmates against the Genesee County Sheriff's Department in regards to the water quality at the Genesee County Jail. The suit seeks only an injunction that will order the sheriff's department to continue to serve inmates only bottled water and dry food that does not require water to prepare.

On March 24, the City of Flint filed a notice of intent sue in the Court of Claims against the State of Michigan, the MDEQ and four MDEQ employees for their mishandling of the crisis. A week later, Mayor Weaver said she has no intentions to proceed with a lawsuit, and the move is to "protect the future interest of the city". On March 25, a federal lawsuit filed by the ACLU asked for an order requiring water to be delivered to homes of people without access to transportation or who are physically disabled. The case was settled a year later for $87 million (with an additional $10 million in reserve), which will be used to replaced 18,000 lead pipes by 2020.

On April 6, 2016, a class action lawsuit brought by 15 Flint residents accused Governor Snyder and several state agencies and government officials of being in violation of the Racketeer Influenced and Corrupt Organizations Act in regards to the crisis.

On May 18, 2016, the NAACP sued the state of Michigan and Governor Snyder, seeking compensation for property damages, pain and suffering damages, emotional distress damages and medical monitoring for Flint residents and businesses.

On June 22, 2016, the Michigan Attorney General's Office filed a civil suit against engineering firms Veolia North America and Lockwood, Andrews & Newnam (LAN) who were hired to consult Flint water plant officials after the switch to the Flint River in April 2015. The lawsuit accuses Veolia and LAN of professional negligence and public nuisance. Veolia is also accused of fraud. Veolia called the accusations "baseless, entirely unfounded and [appearing] to be intended to distract from the troubling and disturbing realities that have emerged as a result of this tragedy", and then added, "In fact, when Veolia raised potential lead and copper issues, city officials and representatives told us to exclude it from our scope of work because the city and the EPA were just beginning to conduct lead and copper testing." Michigan Attorney General Dana Nessel amended the complaint on April 12, 2019, stating the companies "made multiple missteps by designing water treatment measures that made the water corrosive. Those failures ultimately resulted in bacterial problems in Flint's water, potentially dangerous disinfectant byproducts, the corrosion of the city's water distribution system, and high lead levels." On May 28, 2019, Veolia denied responsibility for the crisis, instead blaming state and location officials for the crisis, and filed a motion for summary disposition on that date. In November 2019, a Genesee County judge dismissed four of the plaintiff's five charges against Veolia and LAN.

On June 27, 2016, Flint residents Shari Guertin, on behalf of her minor child, and Diogenes Muse-Cleveland, filed a lawsuit accusing several officials of violating their "bodily integrity" by exposing them to lead-contaminated water and hiding it. The defendants are city and state officials including former Flint Department of Public Works Director Howard Croft, former emergency managers Darnell Earley and Gerald Ambrose and former DEQ officials Liane Shekter-Smith, Stephen Busch, Michael Prysby and Bradley Wurfel. Several charges in the case were dismissed by the original trial court on June 5, 2017. The charges were re-instated by the Sixth Circuit Court of Appeals on January 4, 2019.

On November 15, 2016, Chief Judge Richard B. Yuille, Circuit Court of Genesee County, entered a case management Order, wherein he appointed attorney Corey Stern, of Levy Konigsberg, L.L.P., lead counsel for all plaintiffs maintaining claims in the Circuit Court of Genesee County for personal injuries and property damage sustained as a result of the Flint water crisis. Attorney Wayne B. Mason, of Drinker, Biddle & Reath, L.L.P., was appointed lead counsel for the defendants. Judge Yuille called for a small number of lawsuits related to the Flint water crisis to serve as bellwethers, cases that will be fully developed and tried to verdict with the idea that they will help attorneys in other cases evaluate whether to settle or take their cases to trial.

=== 2017 ===
On January 30, 2017, a class action lawsuit with over 1,700 plaintiffs against the EPA seeking $722.4 million was filed, charging them with a violation of section 1431 of the Safe Drinking Water Act, which states, "upon receipt of information that a contaminant that is present in or likely to enter a public water system or an underground source of drinking water, or there is a threatened or potential terrorist attack or other intentional act, that may present an imminent and substantial endangerment to the health of persons, the EPA Administrator may take any action she deems necessary to protect human health".

=== 2020 ===
Two of the lawsuits had reached the Sixth Circuit Appeals Court; in both cases, the Court rejected the city officials' claims of immunity to allow the cases to continue. The Sixth Circuit asserted the citizens had a right to remedy since the officials' decision to switch water sources in 2014 harmed the citizens' Constitutional right to "bodily integrity". The officials had petitioned to the Supreme Court of the United States on the question of immunity, but in January 2020, the Supreme Court declined to hear either case, allowing both cases to proceed at the lower court.

=== 2021 ===
In November 2021, federal District Court Judge Judith E. Levy approved a $626 million settlement in the case against the state of Michigan and other defendants.

== Infrastructure repairs and medical treatment ==
=== 2016 ===
On January 7, 2016, Flint Mayor Karen Weaver said that estimates of the cost of fixing water infrastructure in Flint, such as aging pipes, range from millions up to $1.5 billion. These figures encompass infrastructure alone, excluding any public health costs of the disaster. DEQ interim director Keith Creagh said that estimation of total costs would be premature. However, in a September 2015 email released by Snyder in January 2016, the state estimated the replacement cost to be $60 million, and said it could take up to 15 years to do.

On January 18, 2016, the United Way of Genesee County estimated 6,000–12,000 children have been exposed to lead poisoning and kicked off a fundraising campaign to raise $100 million over a 10–15 year span for their medical treatment. On January 27, 2016, Mona Hanna-Attisha started a fundraiser for the $80,000 needed for the medical treatment of Flint children affected by lead poisoning. Meridian Health Plan of Detroit has agreed to donate up to $40,000 in matching funds to the Community Foundation of Greater Flint for long-term needs Hanna-Attisha expects to arise from the lead issue.

At his annual State of the State address on January 19, Snyder apologized again, and asked the Michigan Legislature to give Flint an additional $28 million in funding for filters, replacement cartridges, bottled water, more school nurses and additional intervention specialists. It also will fund lab testing, corrosion control procedures, a study of water-system infrastructure, potentially help Flint deal with unpaid water bills, case management of people with elevated lead-blood levels, assessment of potential linkages to other diseases, crisis counseling and mental health services, and the replacement of plumbing fixtures in schools, child care centers, nursing homes and medical facilities. The Michigan House Appropriations Committee passed the bill the next day, while the Senate approved it on January 28. Snyder signed it the next day.

On January 21, 2016, President Obama gave an $80 million loan to Michigan for infrastructure repairs, but the amount going to Flint is uncertain.

On January 28, 2016, Democratic U.S. Senators Debbie Stabenow and Gary Peters and Representative Dan Kildee proposed an amendment to pending federal energy legislation to add the special appropriation of up to $400 million to replace and repair the lead service lines in Flint and $200 million more to create a center for lead research in Flint. They also said the state could choose to match up to $400 million for its share of infrastructure repairs in Flint. The newly amended bill was rejected by the Senate on February 4. A new $220 million bill to address the crisis was proposed in the U.S. Senate on February 24.

At a news conference on February 9, 2016, Flint mayor Karen Weaver said that the city would remove and replace all of the city's 15,000 water service lines containing lead piping. Work was expected to begin in March 2016. The project will receive technical advice from the Lansing Board of Water and Light, which removed over 13,000 lead pipes in Lansing, Michigan. Lansing mayor Virg Bernero volunteered to provide the assistance. Weaver appointed Michael C. H. McDaniel, a retired National Guard brigadier general, to oversee the group leading the project, the Flint Action and Sustainability Team (FAST). The city government hopes to complete the project within a year, using 32 work crews, with priority given to the most at-risk households.

The project is expected to cost $55 million, and the funding sources are not yet secured, but the city plans to seek it from local, state, and federal sources. The crews began working on March 4.

On February 16, 2016, the state hired Flint-based engineering firm Rowe Professional Services to begin the process of locating, removing, and eventually replacing lead pipes in the highest risk areas of Flint.

On February 18, 2016, the state gave Flint a $2 million grant that will go towards replacing lead service lines.

On March 6, 2016, Union Labor Life Insurance Company donated $25 million for lead pipe replacements in the city.

On July 18, 2016, city council approved a $500,000 contract with three companies for the second phase of lead pipe replacements: WT Stevens and Johnson & Wood were awarded $320,000 contracts to do no more than 50 homes each. Goyette was awarded $619,500 to tackle replacing lead lines at 150 Flint homes. The city is using $25 million in funding approved by the Michigan legislature in June that was allocated for replacing Flint lead tainted pipes for Fast Start's third phase which will replace infrastructure at an estimated 5,000 homes in Flint.

On October 10, 2016, city council approved contracts to replace pipes at 788 more homes before winter. The third phase will be funded using a portion of $25 million approved by the Michigan Legislature in June that was allocated for replacing Flint lead tainted pipes for Fast Start's third phase, which will replace infrastructure at an estimated 5,000 homes in Flint. Goyette will be paid $1,663,300.60 for replacements at 260 addresses in city wards two, six and eight. WT Stevens will be paid $2,306,384 for replacements at 488 addresses in city wards three, four, eight and nine.

On October 17, 2016, the second phase of the program was completed on 218 homes. By November 22, 2016, the total number of homes with new pipes was 460.

Flint's water service line records were largely unreliable, meaning the city could not say how many lead pipes existed, nor where they were. The City therefore started using a machine learning model to prioritize excavations starting in September 2016. Researchers from the University of Michigan developed this predictive model, using utility and parcel-level data to develop a more accurate service line inventory and calculate the probability that a given service is connected with a lead line. As pipes are dug up and more data is gained, the model updates accordingly and yields more accurate results. Using the model to prioritize excavations throughout 2016 and 2017 yielded a hit rate of about 80%.

A University of Michigan study, conducted by the same researchers responsible for developing the machine learning model, was released on December 1, 2016, stating a total of 29,100 pipes, from all parcels regardless of occupancy, were estimated to be lead. This was based on a representative sample taken of the city's water service lines (approximately 200 homes) using Hydrovac method, which revealed the problem was more extensive than the city anticipated. After the report, the city's estimates of lead/galvanized jumped from 10 to 20% to about 50%.

=== 2017 ===
On January 19, 2017, an engineer at the Flint Water Plant said the facility is in need of $60 million worth of upgrades, which would not be finished until well into 2019. On February 7, 2017, another report said the cost would be $108 million.

On February 6, 2017, the Genesee Intermediate School District received $6.5 million for the Early On Genesee program to provide free evaluations to as many as 5,000 children up to 5 years old facing possible lead-related developmental delays from the state of Michigan.

On March 17, 2017, Flint received a $100 million grant from the EPA for water infrastructure repairs.

On June 30, 2017, the Genesee County Health Department's Healthy Start Program received $15 million to provide health and social services for people who have had or are at risk for lead exposure stemming from Flint water crisis.

=== 2018 ===
In January 2018, the city contracted a private consulting firm, AECOM, to take over water service line excavations and consequently stopped using the machine learning model. During 2018, 10,531 excavations were performed, yielding a hit rate of only 15%.

On March 26, 2018, a U.S. federal court mandate required the city to return to using the machine learning model to prioritize excavations. As a result, the hit rate steadily increased and was close to 70% as of 2019.

== Long-term effects of lead poisoning ==
Childhood lead exposure causes a reduction in intellectual functioning and IQ, academic performance, and problem-solving skills, and an increased risk of attention deficit disorder, aggression, and hyperactivity. According to studies, children with elevated levels of lead in the blood are more likely as adults to commit crimes, be imprisoned, be unemployed or underemployed, or be dependent on government services. While changes in IQ may appear small from the elevated blood levels, it has been estimated that each increase in an IQ point raises worker's productivity by 1.76–2.38%, and that the economic benefit for each year of 3.8 million 2-year-old children could be from $110 to $319 billion.

In addition, early-life exposure to lead may increase risk of later-life neurological disorders such as Alzheimer's disease, and this risk is likely to persist into late life long after lead has been removed from the body. A 2014 study by researchers at Risk Science Center at the University of Michigan, completed before the Flint water crisis came to light, estimated the annual cost of childhood lead exposure in Michigan at $330 million ($205 million in decreases in lifetime earnings, $105 million in additional criminal justice system expenditures, $18 million in health expenditures to diagnose lead positioning and lead-linked attention deficit disorder), and $2.5 million in additional special education expenditures.

Because the developmental effects of lead exposure appear over a series of years, the total long-term cost of the Flint water crisis "will not be apparent in the short term." However, the cost is expected to be high. Philippe Grandjean of the Harvard T.H. Chan School of Public Health, an expert in the effects of environmental pollution on brain development, said that "when calculated from the loss of lifetime income, the societal costs from lead exposure (across the United States) reach billion-dollar amounts."

== Political responses ==
=== Federal government ===
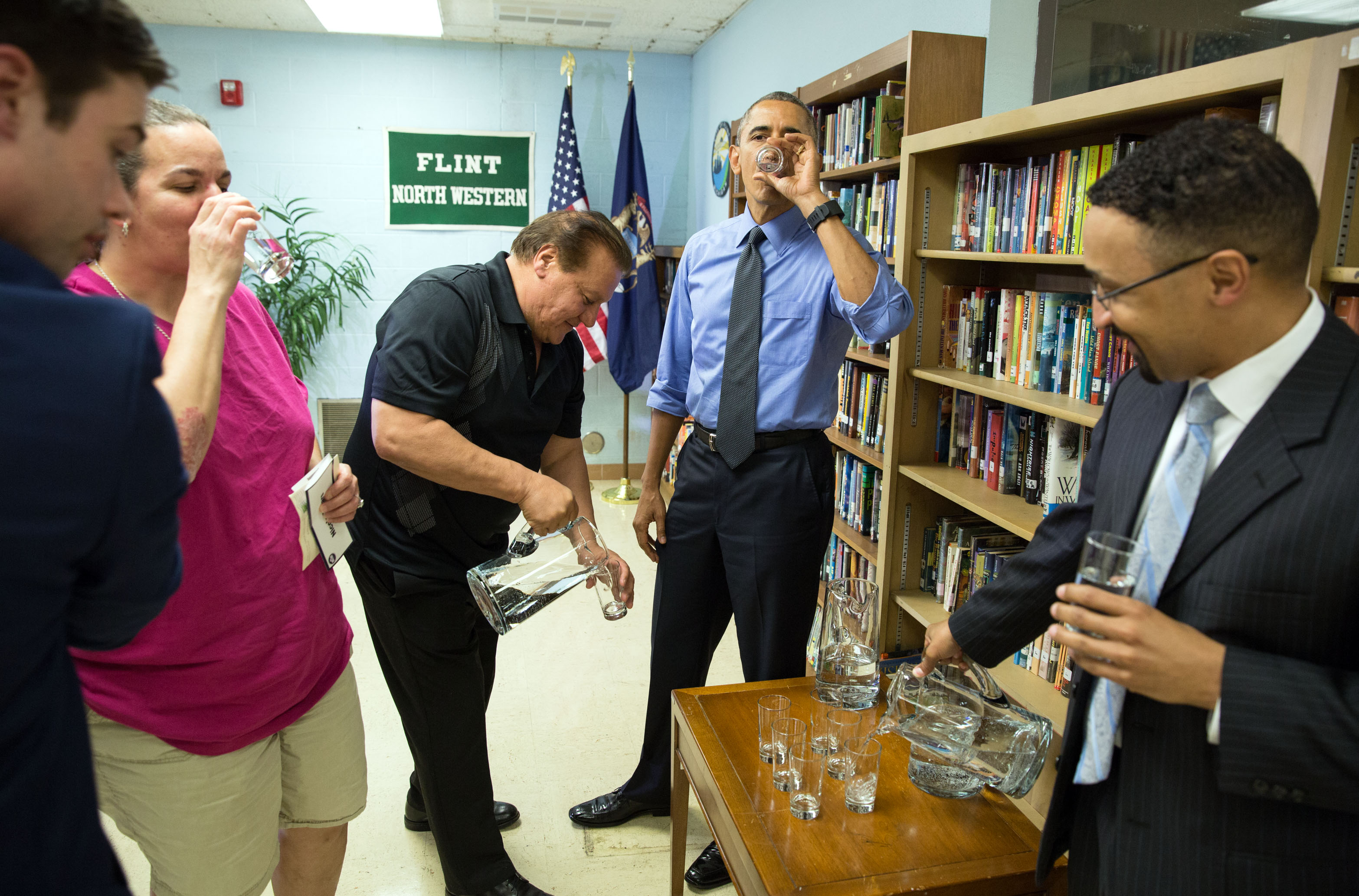
President Barack Obama sips filtered Flint water following a roundtable on the crisis at Northwestern High School on May 4, 2016.

Dan Kildee, the Democratic party congressman in the House of Representatives representing the Michigan 5th district which includes Flint, along with Republican Michigan Representative Fred Upton, sponsored H.R. 4470, the Safe Drinking Water Act Improved Compliance Awareness Act, which would ensure that the public promptly learns of excessive lead levels in their drinking water by setting forth how and when states, EPA, and public utilities communicate their findings. It has passed the House, but has yet to be passed by the Senate, where it has been read twice and referred to the Committee on Environment and Public Works.

Among the Michigan congressional delegation, only Representative Justin Amash, Republican of Cascade Township, opposed federal aid for Flint. Amash opined that "the U.S. Constitution does not authorize the federal government to intervene in an intrastate matter like this one."

In December 2016, President Barack Obama signed the Water Infrastructure Improvements for the Nation Act of 2016 which earmarked $170 million to address the Flint water crisis. The first $100 million was released in March 2017, by the US Environmental Protection Agency after President Trump had taken office.

President Donald Trump's plan to fix the crisis in Michigan was folded into a federal infrastructure plan that had no direct reference to or specific proposal for the crisis in Flint.

Dan Kildee, the Democratic party congressman in the House of Representatives representing the Michigan 5th district which includes Flint, reintroduced on July 10, 2019, a bill in the House, originally introduced in 2017, as HR 3677, the National Opportunity for Lead Exposure Accountability and Deterrence Act (NO LEAD) of 2017. Tammy Duckworth, Democratic Senator for Illinois, announced on the same day, July 10, 2019, the introduction of a bill in the Senate as S. 2086, the National Opportunity for Lead Exposure Accountability and Deterrence (NO LEAD) of 2019. The nearly-identical bills aim to help ensure drinking water across the USA is safe from lead and copper contamination, and would update the Lead and Copper Rule, lowering the lead action level from 15 parts per billion (ppb) currently, to 10 ppb by 2020 and 5 ppb by 2026. The bill would also create a lead-service-line inventory to help monitor contaminated service lines and ensure the Environmental Protection Agency (EPA) develops a universal testing protocol to make sure the entire lead service line is replaced if water contamination is detected, as partial replacement does not eliminate the risk of contamination.

=== State legislature ===
On January 4, 2016, citing the Flint water crisis, Michigan Representative Phil Phelps, Democrat of Flushing, announced plans to introduce a bill to the Michigan House of Representatives that would make it a felony for state officials to intentionally manipulate or falsify information in official reports, punishable by up to five years' imprisonment and a $5,000 fine.

On March 2, House Democratic leader Tim Greimel called on Governor Snyder to resign, due to his "negligence and indifference" in his handling of the Flint water crisis. Also on that date, State Democratic Party Chairman Brandon Dillon called for Michigan Treasurer Nick Khouri to resign due to his role in a loan agreement from April 2015 that blocked Flint from switching back to the Detroit system.

=== 2016 presidential election ===
==== Donald Trump ====
On January 19, 2016, then-Republican-candidate Donald Trump said, "It's a shame what's happening in Flint, Michigan. A thing like that shouldn't happen." After clinching the Republican nomination, Trump visited Flint on September 14, 2016, and toured the water plant and a Flint church, where he promised to fix the water crisis, and in a speech there, he outlined larger issues, claiming NAFTA caused General Motors' abandonment of Flint and the area's subsequent ongoing recession, saying, "It used to be that cars were made in Flint and you couldn't drink the water in Mexico. Now cars are made in Mexico, and you can't drink the water in Flint. That's terrible."

==== Hillary Clinton ====
Democratic Presidential nominee Hillary Clinton repeatedly mentioned the crisis during her campaign, saying: "The people of Flint deserve to know the truth about how this happened and what Governor Snyder and other leaders knew about it. And they deserve a solution, fast. Thousands of children may have been exposed to lead, which could irreversibly harm their health and brain functioning. Plus, this catastrophe—which was caused by a zeal to save money at all costs—could actually cost $1.5 billion in infrastructure repairs." In a subsequent interview, Clinton referred to her work on lead abatement in housing in upstate New York while a U.S. Senator and called for further funding for healthcare and education for children who will experience the negative effects of lead exposure on behavior and educational attainment.

The crisis was also the catalyst for a town hall style debate in Flint between Clinton and Democratic rival Bernie Sanders on March 6, 2016, two days before the Michigan Presidential primary election. It was hosted by CNN anchors Anderson Cooper and Don Lemon. Both candidates called for Governor Snyder to resign during the event.

== Other responses ==
Various organizations, private and political, reported on and responded to the water crisis in Flint nationwide. The media attention in Flint spread to encompass infrastructural problems in other cities, and studies on the crisis and its fallout proliferated. Media figures and organizations reported on the crisis extensively, and several called for Governor Rick Snyder's arrest or resignation. The event was described by civil rights advocates as an example of environmental racism.

== Prevention ==
According to The Arkansas Journal of Social Change and Public Service, the failure of preventing the crisis in Flint was that of the Michigan officials, however the failure of the situation not being deescalated is due to the Obama presidency. The president failed to declare a state of emergency quick enough, and that was very alarming to many people due to his campaign pushing for bettering the African-American community. Flint city has a huge number of African-American people within its population, thus making the city a minority. So even though the Obama administration encouraged progress in minority communities, Flint's growth was really delayed considerably by his silence. In the end, because the Obama presidency failed to adequately deal with the crisis, many people's lives were ruined.

It took almost two years for the Obama presidency to render aid for the citizens in Flint, and declare a state of emergency for the city. In those two years, the city of Flint really struggled due to their poor economy. Residents of Flint would have significantly benefited from the aid that the federal government could have provided sooner. Flint, a low-income community, lacked the resources needed for dealing with such a problem. Assistance from the federal government was needed, but it came too late. The community had begun to feel the effects of lead poisoning by the time the federal government sent assistance to Flint.

Another reason the Flint water crisis happened was due to faulty policies, and acts. To be specific, the Flint water crisis was caused by the combined collapse of the federal Safe Drinking Water Act and Michigan's Local Financial Stability and Choice Act. Because of these acts, a technical strategy was adopted, ignoring the core political and social issues in favor of technical solutions. The primary causes of Flint's water issue, such as poor infrastructure investment and the exclusion effects of budget cuts forced on struggling cities, were ignored by these initiatives.

It was also said that a major reason as to why the government failed to prevent and deal with the crisis was because of the intricacy of the laws governing the upkeep and monitoring of safe drinking water by government agencies. Managing several legal arrangements requires coordination between agencies. That coordination was not done well enough to properly deal with the issue.

According to Larry Clark of Sustainable Performance Solutions, consulting professionals such as "professional engineers, licensed plumbers, or water-treatment specialists" could have had a positive impact on the outcome. In addition to professional consultation, EPA reform would help prevent another Flint water crisis. Current water-testing techniques can underestimate water lead levels because sampling is sometimes concentrated on neighborhoods with known low lead levels or lead-free pipes. Jeff Ruch, executive director of Public Employees for Environmental Responsibility (PEER), said that EPA reform could enforce rules that "ensure that all cities get an early warning when lead levels rise to the danger point".

One preventative measure that was not properly upheld was the Clean Water Act. Passed in 1972, this act established policies to prevent water health crises such as the lead poisoning of Flint, Michigan. The Clean Water Act "established the basic structure for regulating pollutant discharges into the waters of the United States". The EPA has also updated its standards and created six goals for improving the drinking water of the nation. This plan was created in November 2016 to decrease the amount of pollution in water. In the situation of Flint, MI, a corrosive water source was introduced "into an aging water system without adequate corrosion control".

A study at the University of Arizona, Tucson used the Flint water crisis to illustrate the economic benefits of utilizing three specific point-of-use (POU) devices, which included reverse osmosis, activated carbon, and distillation. Many factors such as "POU device costs, lead absorption from water, and economic losses associated with reduced IQ" were taken into account to determine the cost-benefit of each device. The study found that the water lead level breakeven points for reverse osmosis, activated carbon, and distillation were 7.31 μg/L, 3.73 μg/L, and 12.0 μg/L, respectively. The cost-benefit was analyzed as a 70-year (lifetime) duration, which is much longer than the Flint water crisis, and the POU devices proved to be a cost-effective tool in preventing the consumption of water-soluble lead in the future.

In Flint, a data-driven approach has aided in spending public money in ways that directly align with public health protection. Predictive models using historical city data have been utilized to estimate the probability of homes in the city containing lead pipes. Because the public (utility-owned) portion of service lines is buried under roads and sidewalks, it is expensive to verify pipe materials. Depending on the verification method, it can range from a few hundred dollars to a few thousand dollars per home. Flint spent more than $20 million on unnecessary excavations when it ignored model predictions in 2018, instead of targeting homes with the highest likelihood of having a lead service line. This could have been largely avoided with the continued use of the machine learning model developed in 2016.

== Indirect mental health impact ==
As the water crisis unfolded, residents experienced considerable anxiety over the physical and mental health impacts of lead poisoning on both adults and children, stress, and anger at political leaders. Some adults felt guilty about giving children contaminated water, some even felt scared to let their children in the bath, or come into contact with the water. Adults struggled with depression and showed signs of suicidal ideation because of what was occurring with their children. In some cases family members stopped visiting. Some residents related the water crisis to depression and even thoughts of suicide; some sought treatment for mental breakdowns. The state government gave a $500,000 grant to the Genesee Health System for free counseling in addition to sending state mobile crisis teams and expanding Medicaid programs for affected residents. Volunteer social workers arrived from across the state, and the United States Public Health Service offered training.

A study from the University of Michigan provided evidence that demonstrated an association between the Flint water crisis and sleep conditions. Surveys were offered at every opportunity, including by mail, email, social media, and in-person events to as many Flint, Michigan residents as possible. 834 respondents from September 30, 2015, to September 28, 2016, were included in the analysis. In the survey, respondents had to rate the quality of their tap water (taste, smell, appearance), rate the quality of their sleep, list the duration of sleep in a typical night, and fill out basic demographics. The study found that a lower perceived quality of tap water was associated with lower sleep quality and a shorter duration of sleep.

Years after the crisis began, it was reported that up to a quarter of the population was possibly suffering from PTSD.

Another study was conducted on Flint residents to gauge the mental health impact of the crisis on the residents. In May 2016, the Centers for Disease Control and Prevention (CDC), with the help of the city, conducted a Community Assessment for Public Health Emergency Response (CASPER). The study was to get data on the individual and household level data on the physical and mental health outcomes in the communities where there was a public health disaster. CASPER results found that the residents in Flint had lower levels of mental health than previously reported in 2012 and 2014 by the Michigan Behavioral Risk Factor Surveillance System.

== Economic impact ==
The water crisis caused the value of Flint housing to fall between $520 million to $559 million. Home prices remained depressed even after $400 million in remediation spending and after the water was declared safe for consumption.

== Environmental impact ==
The lead poisoning from Flint's water has harmed the local environment. Due to the poisoning of the Earth, farmers have expressed concern for lead poisoning in their soil through the water that comes in from the Flint river. Contaminating fresh produce creates more than one mode for contaminated drinking water to reach community members.

The elevated lead levels in soil posed a long-term challenge to environmental remediation efforts. Lead can persist in soils for decades, necessitating expensive and time-consuming cleanup efforts, such as soil replacement or phytoremediation techniques. However, financial constraints and limited federal support have delayed the implementation of comprehensive soil decontamination measures.

In 2016, the Environmental Protection Agency (EPA) issued an emergency administrative order regarding the Flint water system, citing an "imminent and substantial endangerment to the health of persons." The order mandated immediate corrective actions, including the identification and replacement of lead service lines and the implementation of effective corrosion control measures, requiring strict compliance from city and state agencies.

== Political impact ==
The water crisis in Flint urged many residents and community organizations to take political action. Grassroots activism played a very important role in making the government address the issue. Citizens in Flint called to action and have created the community-based organization the "Water Warriors". They have come together to advocate for their right to have clean and drinkable water alongside the "Flint Democracy Defense League and Concerned Pastors for Social Action" to conduct studies that eventually garnered attention to move the crisis forward to change.

In addition to grassroots efforts, the crisis had a lasting impact on Michigan's political landscape. The long battle for a government response not only made the public health worse but also lessened residents' trust in authorities on state and federal levels. Residents also did not trust the water they were supplied with, even though it was said to be safe. This was found in a 2016 survey of Flint residents revealed that a little less than half of the respondents disagreed with the statement that they trust their local government, while a little more than half said that they disagreed with the statement about trusting their state government. The lack of trust is because of the governments lack of action about the crisis, and the ignoring of the citizens concerns. State leaders faced widespread criticism for their delayed response and mismanagement, leading to calls for greater transparency and accountability in government. Governor Rick Snyder's administration faced constant public scrutiny, as residents and activists demanded stronger regulatory oversight to prevent similar disasters. The controversy also spurred bipartisan efforts to secure federal funding for infrastructure upgrades, signaling a shift in national priorities toward addressing aging water systems.

The political ramifications influenced national conversations on environmental justice and government accountability. National organizations and policymakers began to criticize state-appointed emergency managers for prioritizing cost-cutting measures over public health. Critics argued that the emergency manager system, designed to address financial crises, often sidelined community voices, prioritizing cover-ups over addressing public needs.

The crisis also highlighted systemic inequality regarding race, poverty, and environmental health. Flint is home to a predominantly African American and economically disadvantaged community. Advocacy groups constantly reminded that state and federal governments that clean water as a fundamental human right.

Calls to action examples:

1. February 2016: A mile-long march was organized by a group of Flint residents to protest against the crisis. Runners chanted how sick they felt, held signs and flags as they ran to the water plants. Organizers said that the run was to enact change though making noise, and putting the pressure on government officials.
2. April 2018: Flint residents took their outrage to the Michigan capitol, after the end of a free water bottle program. With the ongoing crisis in Flint, and not having clean water to drink, the government gave free water bottles as relief. However, the program was taken away. Flint residents protested against the decision with chants saying "you did it, you fix it".
3. April 2019: Members from the "Faith Deliverance Center" in Flint hold a rally to make noise, and bring attention to the water crisis on the five year anniversary. The main purpose for this rally was to bring attention to how slow the recovery process for Flint has been, they chanted "We'll scream loud". They are urging for more help form government officials.
4. April 2023: Members of the "Water You Fighting For?" organization, and the "Democracy Defense League" held a rather on the ninth anniversary of the crisis. The purpose of the rally was to bring the community back together so people do not lose hope, and know that they are together in this fight for clean water.
5. April 2024: Citizens from all over Flint city marched to the city hall to demand their right for clean water, nearing the date of the crisis's tenth anniversary. Members from the M.A.D.E institute say that they wanted to show their "undying spirit" and that even though it has been ten years, the fight is still far from over. They were able to show this spirit in many different ways over the month of April. The city held a forum at United Auto Workers Local 659, a vigil at their local church, and a political community update station to inform the community of any updates of their situation.

== Donations of water and money ==
=== People ===
- Celebrity donations include the singers Cher and Bruno Mars, rapper Meek Mill, comedians Dave Chappelle and Jimmy Fallon, and many others have made high-profile donations to assist Flint.
- A group made up of actor Mark Wahlberg and rappers Sean Combs, Eminem, and Wiz Khalifa donated 1 million bottles of water to Flint.
- Singer Aretha Franklin said she would provide hotel rooms and food for 25–50 Flint residents.
- Detroit Lions defensive end Ziggy Ansah donated 94,000 bottles to Flint.
- Singer Madonna (a native of nearby Bay City) donated $10,000 to the Community Foundation of Greater Flint.
- Singer Kem donated $10,000 to the Salvation Army of Genesee County.
- Rapper The Game donated $1,000,000 in water bottles to Flint.
- Craigslist founder Craig Newmark donated $50,000 and 25,000 cases of water to the United Way of Southeastern Michigan.
- NFL player and Flint native Brandon Carr donated $100,000 to the Community Foundation of Greater Flint and $10,000 to the Safe Water Safe Homes Fund.
- Mari Copeny, also known as Little Miss Flint, launched a t-shirt fundraiser that says 'Don't Forget Flint' to raise money for events and programs that benefit kids impacted by the water crisis in Flint. As of 2024, she has raised approximately $250k for bottled water, $834k for water filters, and $650k for holiday events for kids in Flint, MI.
- Actor and rapper Jaden Smith introduced a portable water filtration system called the Water Box to Flint in 2019.

=== Companies and organizations ===
- As of September 8, 2017, the Ruth Mott Foundation and the Community Foundation of Greater Flint had directed a combined $33,480,494 to various programs to aid both children and adults affected by Flint's water crisis.
- Support has also come from companies, including Detroit-based Faygo, grocer Meijer, the Dow Chemical Company of nearby Midland, and Ball Corporation, among many others.
- The United Auto Workers union donated drinking water to Flint via a caravan of trucks to local food banks, and an AmeriCorps team announced that it would deploy to Flint to assist in response efforts.
- The Windsor Spitfires donated 40,000 bottles of water, and the Sarnia Sting donated 15,000 bottles of water.
- The Little River Band of Ottawa Indians donated $10,000 to the Genesee County Sheriff's Department.
- Terrance Knighton and his Washington Redskins teammates donated 3,600 bottles of water to Flint's Catholic Charities USA.
- Rock band Pearl Jam and a large group of musicians donated $300,000 to the United Way of Genesee County, and started a CrowdRise fundraiser for donations from its fans.
- In January 2016, fundraising website GoFundMe promised to donate an additional $10,000 to the fund of the winner of a contest between groups trying to raise money for Flint.
- Anheuser-Busch donated 51,744 cans of water to the Food Bank of Eastern Michigan.
- The Detroit Pistons donated $500,000 to the United Way of Genesee County from their FlintNOW fundraising campaign from the previous night's game.
- Walmart, The Coca-Cola Company, Nestlé, and PepsiCo announced that they would collectively donate a total of 176 truckloads of water (up to 6.5 million bottles) through the end of 2016.
- FedEx, along with the city of Memphis, Tennessee, donated 12,000 bottles of water to the Food Bank of Eastern Michigan.
- A group of nine banks collectively donated $600,000 to the Community Foundation of Greater Flint.
- The Michigan State Medical Society donated $10,000 to the Community Foundation of Greater Flint.
- The LaPorte County, Indiana Sheriff's Office donated 2,300 cases of water to a church in Flint.
- The Northwest Indiana Truck Club donated 3,500 cases of water to Flint.
- The police fraternity Brothers Before Others donated 330 cases of water bottles, 361 one-US-gallon (3.8 L) water jugs and $1,000 to the Flint Police Department.
- The charity Resources Unite of Dubuque, Iowa collected 300,000 bottles of water for Flint.
- A group of students from Ohio State University donated 10,000 pounds (4,500 kg) of water to Flint's Catholic Charities USA.
- Amtrak donated 30,000 bottles of water to Flint.
- Consumers Energy, the area's gas and electricity provider, donated $50,000 during the crisis ($25,000 to the Community Foundation of Greater Flint and $25,000 to the United Way of Genesee County), and its employees are delivering water to Flint homes. It also offered to match donations from employees and retirees, up to $25,000.
- The Michigan Masonic Charitable Foundation donated $100,000 to the Community Foundation of Greater Flint.
- The Dr Pepper Snapple Group donated 41,000 bottles of water to the Food Bank of Eastern Michigan.
- Platinum Equity's FlintNOW Foundation, in conjunction with Huntington Bank, started a $25 million economic development program to loan aid money to Flint businesses affected by the water crisis.
- Two prisons in Northern Michigan donated 29,000 bottles of water to the Genesee Intermediate School District.
- The Kresge Foundation donated $2 million to the Community Foundation of Greater Flint.

=== Religious organizations ===
- Tabernacle Baptist Church in Knoxville, Tennessee, donated 70,000 pounds (32,000 kg) of water to Flint.
- The United Church of Christ and the Disciples of Christ, two Flint-area Protestant denominations, worked together to launch a water distribution effort.
- Flint Jewish Federation worked in partnership with the American Red Cross to help get clean water to homes.
- In January 2016, Muslim organizations, including Who is Hussain, Life for Relief and Development, Islamic Relief USA, and the Michigan Muslim Community Council, donated and distributed thousands of bottles of water to Flint-area residents. By May, Michigan's Muslim community had donated around one million bottles of water to Flint-area residents.

=== Fundraising events ===
- Comedians George Lopez, Eddie Griffin, Cedric the Entertainer, Charlie Murphy, and D. L. Hughley performed stand-up comedy in Flint's Dort Federal Credit Union Event Center as part of The Comedy Get Down Tour, with the proceeds to go to the Community Foundation of Greater Flint.
- $50,000 was raised at the Meridian Winter Festival in Detroit was donated to the Community Foundation of Greater Flint.
- On February 28, 2016, coinciding with the 88th Academy Awards ceremony, film directors Ryan Coogler and Ava DuVernay held a charity event at the Whiting Auditorium in Flint. The event, titled #JusticeForFlint, was live-streamed by Sean Combs' Revolt.tv network. Hosted by comedian Hannibal Buress, it featured singers Janelle Monáe and Ledisi, as well as actor-activists Jesse Williams and Jussie Smollett, among others. The event raised $156,000.
- A telethon led by Detroit TV station WDIV and simulcast on Michigan's other NBC affiliates raised $566,982 for the Community Foundation of Greater Flint. Detroit Pistons owner and Flint native Tom Gores matched the amount, doubling the amount raised to $1,133,964.
- A benefit concert to support children affected by the crisis presented by Flint country music station Nash FM 95.1 featuring Granger Smith and Tegan Marie was held at the Dort Federal Center in Flint on April 7, 2016, with the proceeds going to Hurley's Children Hospital.
- A charity celebrity basketball game called Hoop 4 Water featuring former Michigan State Spartans players Morris Peterson (from Flint), Zach Randolph and Jason Richardson, Coach Tom Izzo, and rapper Snoop Dogg was played in Flint on May 22, 2016. Izzo and Snoop Dogg agreed to return to Flint for the same event in 2017, along with other celebrities, held on May 20.
- Fight for Flint was a boxing fundraiser at Flint's Dort Federal Event Center featuring Tommy "The Hitman" Hearns, along with brothers Andre Dirrell and Anthony Dirrell; Mike Hernandez, Troy Albrine Jr., Rakim Johnson; and female boxers Jackie Kallen, Fatuma Zarika and Alicia Ashley. It was sponsored by Don Elbaum Promotions and the Catholic Charities of Shiawassee and Genesee Counties.
- A fundraiser called Fashion For Flint held in late January 2017 helped raise money to purchase 10,000 bottles of water.

== In popular culture ==
The Flint water crisis has been depicted in various forms of media, including film, theater, documentaries, books, and music. Flint (2017) is a Lifetime television drama film centering a woman from Flint and the impacts of the water crisis on her family. Similar stories of personal struggle through the water crisis were shared through the theatrical productions Flint (2018) and Wrong River.

=== Documentaries ===
Multiple documentaries center the Flint water crisis. Local news sources were amongst the first to provide in-depth investigations on the matter, including Michigan Radio's Not Safe to Drink (2015) and WDIV-TV's (NBC affiliate in Detroit's) Failure In Flint: The Crisis Continues (2017). Legal advocacy organization American Civil Liberties Union also produced a documentary, Here's to Flint 2016. National documentary broadcasters also took it upon themselves to report on the water crisis, with RT Documentary producing Murky Waters of Flint: How a whole city was poisoned (2016), PBS's Nova producing Poisoned Water (2017), and PBS's Frontline producing Flint's Deadly Water (2019). Additional documentaries include Flint: The Poisoning of an American City (2019), Netflix-produced Flint Town (2018), Flint (2020), and Lead and Copper (2024).

=== Books ===
A number of books were written about the water crisis, with the title theme often revolving around poison. The first book was Bridge Magazine's Poison on Tap (2016). In 2018, Mona Hanna-Attisha authored the New York Times notable book What the Eyes Don't See: A Story of Crisis, Resistance, and Hope in an American City. Mona Hanna-Attisha's research played a key role in exposing the Flint water crisis. Other works include Anna Clark's The Poisoned City: Flint's Water and the American Urban Tragedy (2018) and Candy J. Cooper and Marc Aronson's Poisoned Water: How the Citizens of Flint, Michigan, Fought for Their Lives and Warned the Nation (2020).

=== Music ===
Numerous artists used music as an outlet for expressing discontent with the government handling of the crisis. Local artists that produced music include Jon Connor's "Fresh Water for Flint" (2016), King 810's "We Gotta Help Ourselves", and Dr. Andrea Ramsey's "But a Flint Holds Fire" (2016). The water crisis made its way into British music as well, with English rock band Black Midi producing "Near DT, MI" in 2019.

The water crisis was widely referenced in rap music. Big Sean (ft. Eminem) – "No Favors", Big Sean – "Savage Time", Pusha T (ft. Jay-Z) – "Drug Dealers Anonymous", Logic – "America", Vic Mensa – "Shades of Blue", The Game (ft. Will.I.Am & Nas) – "The Ghetto", and Common (ft. Stevie Wonder) – "Black America Again". These big-name rappers used their platform to raise awareness about the water crisis and name Flint, Michigan directly.

== See also ==
- 1993 Milwaukee Cryptosporidiosis outbreak
- Martin County Kentucky Water Crisis
- Benton Harbor, Michigan#Water state of emergency
- Boston Public Schools#History
- Euthenics
- Drinking water quality in the United States
- Environmental racism in the United States
- Hinkley groundwater contamination
- Jackson, Mississippi water crisis
- Lead poisoning
- Lead contamination in Washington, D.C. drinking water
- Newark water crisis in schools
- Pittsburgh water crisis
- The Poisoned City
- Racial capitalism
- Red Hill water crisis
- Toxic hotspots
- Veolia Water
- Water treatment
- Water pollution
