= Clarence M. Kimball High School =

Public school in Royal Oak, Michigan

Location
- 1500 Lexington Boulevard, Royal Oak, Michigan, United States
- Coordinates: 42°31′23″N 83°09′43″W

Information
- School type: Public
- Motto: "Home of the Knights"
- Established: 1957
- Closed: 2006
- School district: Royal Oak Neighborhood Schools
- Final principal: Michael Greening
- Enrollment: 1,100 (in 2006)
- Colors: Blue and Gold
- Nickname: The Knights
- Publication: Newsmagazine The Herald (1957)
- Yearbook: Lancer
- Affiliations: Royal Oak Neighborhood Schools
- Website: web.archive.org/web/20030202171218/http://www.rosd.k12.mi.us/schools/kimball.html

Clarence M. Kimball High School was a secondary educational facility located in Royal Oak, Michigan, in Greater Detroit and had 1,10 students at the time of its consolidation with Dondero High School following the 2005-06 school year to form Royal Oak High School, which occupies the former Kimball High School building. The final principal was Michael Greening. It was a part of Royal Oak Neighborhood Schools. The school's mascot was the Knights.

The school opened in 1957, at which time the district's original school became Dondero High School.

== Notable alumni ==
- Mona Hanna-Attisha, Flint Water Crisis whistleblower
- Brad Havens, Major League Baseball (MLB) pitcher
- Amy Ronanye Krause, Michigan Court of Appeals judge
