= Mona Hanna =

American pediatrician who uncovered the Flint water crisis

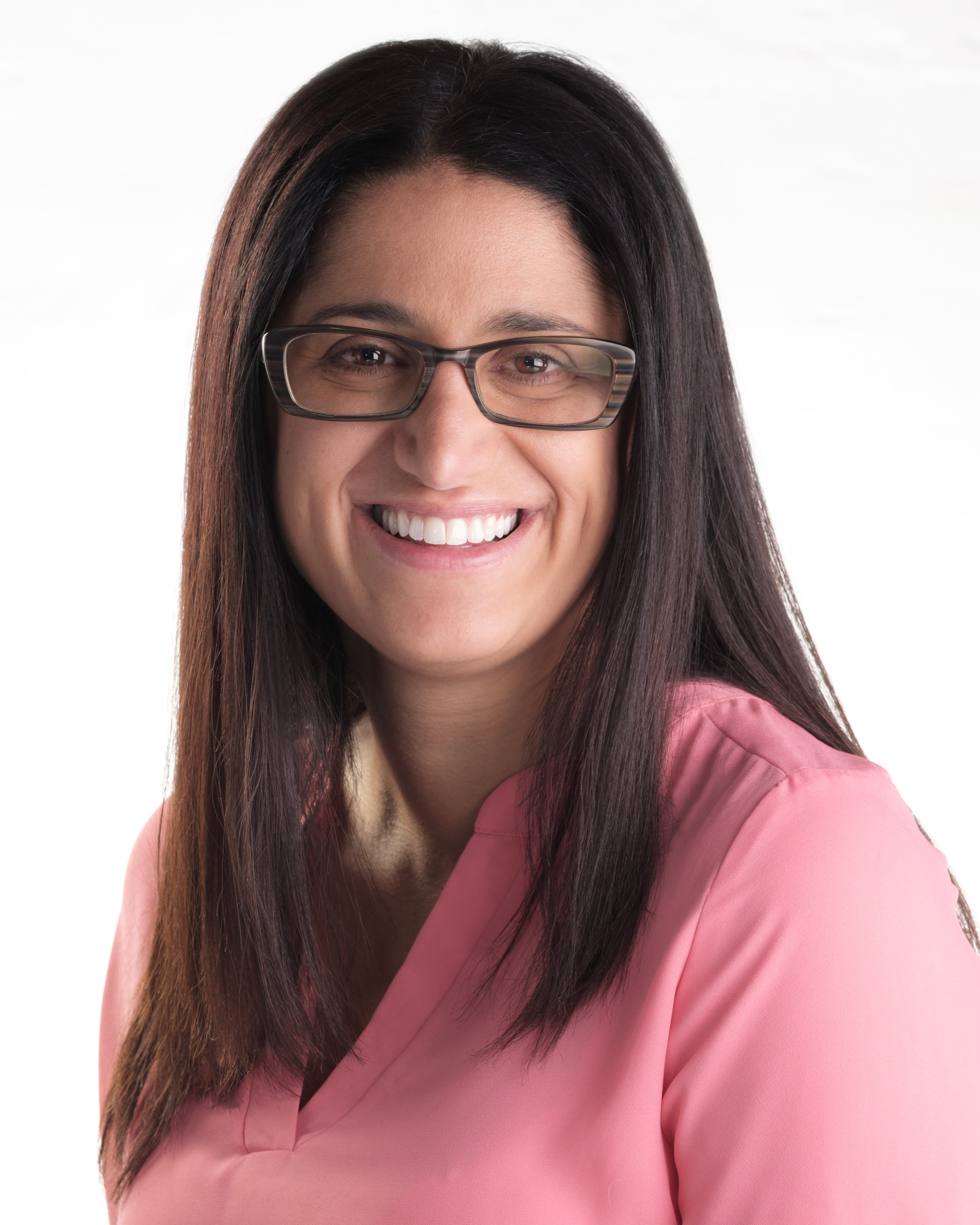
- Born: Mona Hanna; 9 December 1976 (age 49); Sheffield, England, UK
- Other names: Dr. Mona; Mona Hanna-Attisha
- Education: University of Michigan (B.S., M.P.H); Michigan State University (M.D.)
- Occupations: Pediatrician and professor
- Employer(s): Michigan State University (professor); Hurley Medical Center (pediatrician)
- Known for: Uncovering the Flint water crisis
- Awards: Time100 Impact Awards in Health (2026); Bernard Lown Award for Social Responsibility in Medicine (2022); Vilcek-Gold Award for Humanism in Healthcare (2019); Heinz Award in Public Policy (2017); Time Magazine's Most Influential People (2016); Politico 50 (2016); Ridenhour Prize for Truth-Telling (2016); PEN American Center James C. Goodall Freedom of Expression Award (2016)

Mona Hanna (born 9 December 1976), formerly known as Mona Hanna-Attisha, is a pediatrician, professor, and public health advocate whose research exposed the Flint water crisis. In January 2024, she launched the first-in-the-nation community-wide universal prenatal and infant cash prescription program, Rx Kids. She is the author of the 2018 book What the Eyes Don't See, which The New York Times named as one of the 100 most notable books of the year.

== Early life ==
=== Childhood and family ===
Born Mona Hanna in Sheffield, England, her parents are Iraqi scientists and dissidents who fled during the Baath regime.

=== Education ===
She grew up in Royal Oak, Michigan and graduated from Kimball High School. Hanna received her Bachelor of Science from University of Michigan School for Environment and Sustainability, her Master of Public Health degree in Health Management and Policy from the University of Michigan School of Public Health, and her medical degree from Michigan State University College of Human Medicine.

=== Residency ===
She completed her residency and chief residency at Wayne State University/Children's Hospital of Michigan.

== Career ==
In 2009, Hanna served as the associate pediatric program director at Children's Hospital of Michigan where she supervised over 100 residents, the development of academic curriculums, online education platform implementation, recruitment of residents, and participated in program committees.

Hanna was appointed director of Hurley Medical Center's pediatric residency program in 2011; there, she continued to supervise residents, develop instruction for students and a 'master clinical teacher series' for faculty. In 2012, Hanna was elected to the Michigan Board of Directors for the American Academy of Pediatrics (AAP).

In 2013, Hanna was named a member of the Public Health Code Advisory Committee who was called upon by then Michigan Governor Rick Snyder to complete a comprehensive review of the then 35-year-old Michigan Public Health Code.

Hanna spoke at MSU Rx in 2014, an event modeled after TEDx, where she shared a presentation titled "What do you want to be when you grow up?" which focused on questions and challenges common to healthcare professionals and teachers working in urban settings like Flint, MI.

In 2015, Hanna led an effort to focus on "prevention and nutrition, along with care for children when they are sick" by moving the Hurley Children's Clinic to be co-located atop the Flint Farmers' Market where health professionals could "suggest fresh foods to purchase and guide [patients] through the process." She received Michigan State University's William B. Weil, Jr., MD Endowed Distinguished Pediatric Faculty Award after being nominated by her peers in recognition "for many years showing outstanding professional and clinical service to the children of our State, to our medical students and Residents, to our Department, the College and the University."

In late 2015, Elin Warn Betanzo, an engineer and certified water operator and a personal friend of Hanna, shared that there was a lack of proper drinking water treatment in Flint, Michigan and an increased potential for lead in the city's water after a recent water source change and that action was not being taken by officials. Hanna learned that Marc Edwards, a civil engineering/environmental engineer from Virginia Tech, had come to Flint in March 2015 and found that the lack of corrosion inhibitors in the new Flint water source was causing corrosion of water pipes and leaching of lead into drinking water. Upon hearing about the possibility of lead in the water, she began a new research study using data available in electronic medical records.

Her study found that the percentage of children in Flint with over 5 micrograms per deciliter of lead in their blood increased from 2.1 percent to 4 percent after the city's water source changed from Lake Huron to the Flint River and that the areas of Flint with the highest water lead levels showed "the most drastic increases in elevated lead levels in children."

Due to the public health implications, she revealed her findings publicly and advocated for action at a 24 September 2015 press conference before her research was scientifically peer-reviewed. The next day, Flint issued a health advisory for residents, particularly children, to minimize exposure to Flint tap water. Hanna's research and findings were criticized by the spokesperson for the State of Michigan's Department of Environmental Quality who accused her of being an "unfortunate researcher," "splicing and dicing numbers," and causing "near hysteria." About ten days later, after the Detroit Free Press published its own findings consistent with those found by Hanna, she then engaged in one-on-one conversations with Michigan's chief medical officer–the State of Michigan backed down and concurred with her findings. Later, at a press conference in which the State of Michigan acknowledged the lead-in-water crisis, Department of Environmental Quality officials apologized to Hanna. In addition, Hanna was appointed by Michigan Governor Rick Snyder's executive order to the Flint Water Interagency Coordinating Committee and Michigan Child Lead Poisoning Elimination Board in response to the Flint water crisis and the Michigan Public Health Commission.

On January 14, 2016, Michigan State University and the Hurley Children's Hospital announced that Hanna would lead a new Pediatric Public Health Initiative to partner with experts and clinicians to help the children of Flint who had been exposed to lead—the program serves as a center for excellence and a national resources for best practices related to lead exposure. In Governor Snyder's January 19 2016 State of the State address, he publicly thanked Hanna and Edwards for sounding the alarm about the Flint water crisis. In late January, the Community Foundation of Greater Flint announced that Hanna and a group of community members had established the Flint Child Health and Development Fund to accept charitable contributions nationwide "to support both short and long term needs of Flint's children exposed to lead." In one year, the fund raised over $17 million and awarded over $2 million in grants directly supporting Flint kids' health and development. Hanna's findings were published in the February 2016 volume of American Journal of Public Health. She testified again in April 2016 before the U.S. House of Representatives Subcommittee on Environment and the Economy and Subcommittee on Health regarding the need for federal action to help increase access to care and provide relief to the people impacted by the man-made disaster resulting from the Flint water crisis. In July 2016, her research findings were confirmed in a Morbidity and Mortality Weekly Report published by the Center for Disease Control and Prevention (CDC) and is recognized as an underestimate of exposure. Eventually, in part due to Hanna's advocacy, $100 million in federal dollars was allocated to Flint in addition to approximately $250 million in state dollars to address the crisis.

In January 2017, Hanna received a grant from the Michigan Department of Health and Human Services to lay the groundwork for the Flint Registry. She has served as the principal investigator of the registry, which has grown into a congressionally-funded and CDC-supported public health program that helps provide long-term surveillance of and support to Flint water crisis victims. In March 2017, Hanna was named vice-chair of Michigan Governor Rick Snyder's Child Lead Exposure Elimination Commission.

In 2018, Hanna's book, What the Eyes Don't See, was published by Random House imprint One World by editor-in-chief Chris Jackson. Her book has been described as a dramatic first-hand account of the Flint Water Crisis with the "gripping intrigue of a Grisham thriller." In addition to positive reviews in the New York Times, the New York Times Book Review, and the Washington Post, What the Eyes Don't See was named a New York Times 100 Notable Book of 2018 and the Best Science Book of 2018 by NPR's Science Friday. Portions of the proceeds of her book are donated to the Flint Child Health and Development Fund. Anonymous Content optioned the book rights to make a movie, to be produced by Michael Sugar and Rosalie Swedlin, and written/directed by Cherien Dabis.

In 2019, Hanna's book was named a Michigan Notable Book of 2019. What the Eyes Don't See was also selected as the common read for the Great Michigan Read, Reading Across Rhode Island, and One Maryland One Book as well as dozens of university common read programs.

In February 2020, Hanna testified before the U.S. House of Representatives Committee on Energy and Commerce Subcommittee on Environment and Climate Change that proposed revisions to the EPA's Lead and Copper Rule were "minimalistic and insufficient" and that "the proposed revisions do not fix these underlying issues, and will not address the national public health crisis of lead in our drinking water delivery system swiftly enough." In July 2020, Hanna was named a C.S. Mott Endowed Professor of Public Health at the Michigan State University College of Human Medicine. She was also appointed to co-chair Michigan Governor Gretchen Whitmer's Protect Michigan Commission.

In April 2021, Hanna testified before the U.S. House of Representatives' Committee on Ways and Means to advocate for action related to the state of the nation's drinking water infrastructure and the need to eliminate lead pipes.

In February 2022, Hanna testified before the U.S. House of Representatives Committee on Ways and Means Subcommittee on Select Revenue Measures that the "state of our drinking water infrastructure is a public health crisis" for the nation and the importance of the Infrastructure Investment and Job Act to the elimination of lead pipes.

In March 2023, Hanna was named the Associate Dean for Public Health in the College of Human Medicine at Michigan State University.

In April 2023, the Charles Stewart Mott Foundation awarded a grant to help Hanna lead Rx Kids, the first community-wide program in the U.S. designed to address poverty as a root cause of health disparities through the provision of unconditional cash allowances to pregnant moms and babies in Flint, Michigan.

Rx Kids was created in response to research showing that household income typically declines before childbirth while poverty rates rise during the first year of a child's life. Rx Kids was launched following evidence from the 2021 expansion of the Child Tax Credit, which reduced child poverty to a record low, and reflects Dr. Mona Hanna's view that poverty prevention is a form of medicine. The program provides $1,500 in cash during pregnancy and $500 per month during infancy as a guaranteed income intervention designed to reduce poverty during early childhood and support maternal and infant health.

In August 2024, Rx Kids announced the city of Kalamazoo as its first expansion community, with the program projected to reach approximately 800 births annually. Enrollment opened on February 1, 2025. In 2025, Hanna expanded Rx Kids to additional communities across Michigan, including counties in the Upper Peninsula as well as municipalities in the Detroit and Lansing metropolitan areas.

By June 2025, Rx Kids reported having distributed over $10 million in direct cash assistance to Michigan families. Preliminary data released in July 2025 indicated associated improvements in participating communities, including increased food security, reductions in housing instability, and lower rates of adverse infant health outcomes such as preterm birth.

In October 2025, the state of Michigan allocated $270 million to expand the program statewide over three years, with an estimated goal of reaching approximately 100,000 babies.

Between January and May 2026, Rx Kids expanded to additional communities across Michigan. Detroit became the largest participating city, serving an estimated 8,000 newborns annually. The program also expanded across the Upper Peninsula, adding multiple rural counties, and enrollment opened in additional communities including Montmorency County, Mount Clemens, and Center Line. The expansion brought the program to more than 60 communities statewide, reaching an estimated 23,000 births per year.

Program evaluations reported improvements in birth outcomes, including reductions in preterm birth, low birth weight, and NICU admissions, as well as increased measures of household financial stability and reduced reports of infant maltreatment investigations. Economic analyses also indicated increased local spending in participating communities.

== Awards and honors ==
=== 2016 ===
- Time Magazine's 100 Most Influential People of 2016
- Politico 50 visionaries transforming American politics in 2016
- Ridenhour Prize for Truth-Telling
- PEN American Center James C. Goodale Freedom of Expression Courage Award
- One of the Ten Outstanding Young Americans of 2016.
- Michiganian of the Year by the Detroit News.
- Rose Nader Award for Arab American activism by the American-Arab Anti-Discrimination Committee (ADC)
- Champion of Justice by Arab Community Center for Economic and Social Services.
- 2016 commencement speaker at Michigan State University, Johns Hopkins School of Public Health, Virginia Tech as well as two other universities.

=== 2017 ===
- Commencement speaker at the University of Michigan School for Environment and Sustainability.
- Recognized by environmental organizations, including the Michigan League of Conservation Voters, the Michigan Environmental Council, the Ecology Center and Children's Environmental Health Network. She was also named a Union of Concerned Scientists 2016 Got Science? Champion.
- Honorary co-chair of the March for Science
- Disobedience Award by the MIT Media Lab for "defying conventions of peer review as they sought to bring attention to Flint's water crisis before more people were affected." Hanna and Edwards donated the $250,000 award to victims of the crisis.
- 22nd Heinz Award for Public Policy

=== 2018 ===
- Inducted to the Michigan Women's Hall of Fame by the Michigan Women's Historical Center.
- Honorary Co-Chair of Governor Gretchen Whitmer's Transition Team.

=== 2019 ===
- Vilcek-Gold Award for Humanism in Healthcare in 2019. The award is a joint award presented in partnership between The Vilcek Foundation and the Arnold P. Gold Foundation. The award is bestowed to a foreign-born individual in the United States who has demonstrated an extraordinary impact on humanism in healthcare through their professional achievements.

=== 2020 ===
- Najeeb Halaby Award for Public Service, Arab American Institute Foundation
- Changemakers for Children's Health Award, Children's Miracle Network Hospitals
- 41st Telly Award, Political/Commentary, Story in the Public Square, The Telly Awards
- Fries Prize for Improving Health, Centers for Disease Control and Prevention (CDC) Foundation
- Scroll for Merit Award, National Medical Association
- 100 Women of the Century, USA Today

=== 2021 ===
- 32 of the Region's Most Influential People of Color, Madison365 Midwest Power Brokers
- Detroit Duchess Award, Detroit Duchess Society
- Environmental Hero Award, Healthcare Without Harm
- James Shea Award, National Association of Geoscience Teachers
- 100 Most Influential Women, Crain's Detroit Business

=== 2022 ===
- Excellence in Instruction Award, Michigan State University & Hurley Children's Hospital Pediatric Public Health Initiative
- John P. McGovern Award, Medical Library Association
- Inaugural Bernard Lown Award for Social Responsibility, Lown Institute
- Inaugural Social Justice Medicine in Action Award - The Blue Flame, Columbia University Postbac Premed Student Council, Social Justice Medicine Club

=== 2024 ===
- National Humanism in Medicine Medal from the Arnold P. Gold Foundation

=== 2025 ===
- USA Today 2025 Women of the Year for her leadership in children's public health, including her work on the Flint water crisis and the creation of the Rx Kids program.

=== 2026 ===
- Time100 Health Award for leadership in founding Rx Kids, a maternal and infant cash assistance program that provides unconditional payments during pregnancy and early infancy to improve health and economic stability for families.

== Personal life ==
Hanna is a first-generation Iraqi-American immigrant who has two daughters.

== Bibliography ==
=== Books ===
- Hanna-Attisha, Mona (2018). What the eyes don't see : a story of crisis, resistance, and hope in an American city. One World.

=== Reports and policy publications ===
- Hanna, M.; Shaefer, H. L.; Fogle, H. (December 20, 2024). Scaling up prenatal and infant cash prescriptions to eradicate deep infant poverty in the United States (Report). Brookings Institution.

=== Peer-reviewed academic works ===
- Agarwal, S.; Shaefer, H. L.; Zamani-Hank, Y.; Finegood, E.; LaChance, J.; Hanna, M. (2026). "The effects of the Rx Kids unconditional cash prescription programme during pregnancy and infancy on birth outcomes in the USA: a population-based, quasi-experimental study". The Lancet Public Health. doi:10.1016/S2468-2667(26)00055-1.
- Agarwal, S.; Shaefer, H. L.; Jubaed, S.; Schneider, W.; Finegood, E. D.; Hanna, M. (2026). "Cash transfers in the perinatal period and investigations of infant maltreatment". JAMA Pediatrics. doi:10.1001/jamapediatrics.2025.8787.
- Hanna, M.; Agarwal, S.; Shaefer, H. L. (2025). "Unconditional cash transfers and prenatal care utilization in Flint, Michigan". JAMA Network Open. 8 (10): e2538406.
- Hanna, M.; Shaefer, H. L.; Finegood, E.; Agarwal, S.; Zamani-Hank, Y.; LaChance, J. (2025). "Hardship and hope: The relationship between unconditional prenatal and infant cash transfers, economic stability, and maternal mental health and well-being". American Journal of Public Health. doi:10.2105/AJPH.2025.308244.
- Shaefer, H. L.; Hanna, M.; Harris, D.; Richardson, D.; Laker, M. (2024). "Protecting the health of children with universal child cash benefits". The Lancet. 404 (10469): 2380–2391. doi:10.1016/S0140-6736(24)02366-3.
- Saxe-Custack, A; Lofton, H; Egan, S; Dawson, C; Hanna-Attisha, M. (July 7, 2022). "Challenges and Successes of a Pediatric Produce Prescription Program During COVID-19". Journal of Nutrition Education and Behavior. 54 (7): S44–S45. doi:10.1016/j.jneb.2022.04.096. PMC 9260005. S2CID 250340011.
- Lieu, I; Hanna-Attisha, M; LaChance, J; Reyes, G; Saxe-Custack, A (June 14, 2022). "Impact of COVID-19 pandemic on the fruit and vegetable prescription program in a pediatric clinic". Current Developments in Nutrition. 6 (1): 135. doi:10.1093/cdn/nzac051.051. PMC 9193407.
- Jones, N; Dannis, J; O'Connell, L; LaChance, J; LeWinn, K; Hanna-Attisha, M (May 16, 2022). "Parent report of child behaviour: Findings from the Flint Registry cohort". Paediatr Perinat Epidemiol. 36 (5): 750–758. doi:10.1111/ppe.12888. PMC 9402223. PMID 35570835.
- Hanna-Attisha, M; Hamp, N; O'Connell, L. (May 2022). "The promise of early intervention for lead-exposed children". JAMA Pediatr. 176 (5): 446–448. doi:10.1001/jamapediatrics.2022.0017. PMID 35254394. S2CID 247252769.
- Saxe-Custack, A; Todem, D; Anthony, J; Kerver, J; LaChance, J; Hanna-Attisha, M (January 21, 2022). "Effect of a pediatric fruit and vegetable prescription program on child dietary patterns, food security, and weight status: A study protocol". BMC Public Health. 22 (1): 150. doi:10.1186/s12889-022-12544-y. PMC 8778506. PMID 35062926.
- Hanna-Attisha, M; O'Connell, L; Saxe-Custack, A; Jones, N; LaChance, J (January–February 2022). "Turning crisis into opportunity". J Pediatr Health Care. 36 (1): 71–73. doi:10.1016/j.pedhc.2021.08.007. PMID 34922678. S2CID 245086414.
- Betanzo, Elin; Rhyan, Corwin; Hanna-Attisha, Mona (November 2021). "Lessons from the first year of compliance sampling under Michigan's revised Lead and Copper Rule and national Lead and Copper Rule implications". AWWA Water Science. 3 (6): 1261. Bibcode:2021AWWWS...3E1261B. doi:10.1002/aws2.1261. S2CID 244885629.
- Saxe-Custack, Amy; LaChance, Jenny; Hanna-Attisha, Mona; Goldsworthy, Mallory; Ceja, Tiffany (December 2021). "Household Supplemental Nutrition Assistance Program Participation is Associated With Higher Fruit and Vegetable Consumption". Journal of Nutrition Education and Behavior. 53 (12): 1060–1065. doi:10.1016/j.jneb.2021.06.017. PMID 34479817. S2CID 237410235.
- Hanna-Attisha, Mona; O'Connell, Lauren; Reyes, Gwendolyn; Reynolds, Lawrence (November 2021). "The American Promise". Academic Pediatrics. 21 (8): S94–S96. doi:10.1016/j.acap.2021.07.002. PMID 34740435. S2CID 242069875.
- Zheng, Shuting; Bishop, Somer L.; Ceja, Tiffany; Hanna-Attisha, Mona; LeWinn, Kaja (December 2021). "Neurodevelopmental profiles of preschool-age children in Flint, Michigan: a latent profile analysis". Journal of Neurodevelopmental Disorders. 13 (1): 29. doi:10.1186/s11689-021-09377-y. PMC 8377967. PMID 34412591.
- Zheng, Shuting; LeWinn, Kaja; Ceja, Tiffany; Hanna-Attisha, Mona; O'Connell, Lauren; Bishop, Somer (August 11, 2021). "Adaptive Behavior as an Alternative Outcome to Intelligence Quotient in Studies of Children at Risk: A Study of Preschool-Aged Children in Flint, MI, USA". Frontiers in Psychology. 12 692330. doi:10.3389/fpsyg.2021.692330. PMC 8385490. PMID 34456806.
- Hanna-Attisha, Mona; Gonuguntla, Ashweena; Peart, Nadine; LaChance, Jenny; Taylor, D. Kay; Chawla, Sanjay (August 2021). "Umbilical Cord Blood Lead Level Disparities between Flint and Detroit". American Journal of Perinatology. 38 (S 01): e26–e32. doi:10.1055/s-0040-1705135. PMID 32143224. S2CID 212621403.
- Saxe-Custack, Amy; LaChance, Jenny; Jess, Jennifer; Hanna-Attisha, Mona (July 29, 2021). "Influence of a Pediatric Fruit and Vegetable Prescription Program on Child Dietary Patterns and Food Security". Nutrients. 13 (8): 2619. doi:10.3390/nu13082619. PMC 8399668. PMID 34444778.
- Saxe-Custack, Amy; LaChance, Jenny; Hanna-Attisha, Mona; Dawson, Chantel (April 2021). "Flint Kids Cook: positive influence of a farmers' market cooking and nutrition programme on health-related quality of life of US children in a low-income, urban community". Public Health Nutrition. 24 (6): 1492–1500. doi:10.1017/S136898002000395X. PMC 10195638. PMID 33028450. S2CID 222213660.
- Saxe-Custack, Amy; Goldsworthy, Mallory; Lofton, Heather Claire; Hanna-Attisha, Mona; Nweke, Onyinye (January 2021). "Family Perceptions of a Cooking and Nutrition Program for Low-Income Children and Adolescents". Global Pediatric Health. 8: 2333794X2198952. doi:10.1177/2333794X21989525. PMC 7868466. PMID 33614838.
- Hanna-Attisha, Mona; Olson, Erik D. (April 2021). "Preexisting Conditions That Kill Us". Family & Community Health. 44 (2): 76–77. doi:10.1097/FCH.0000000000000288. PMC 7879831. PMID 33284156.
- Benfer, Emily A.; Coffey, Emily; Gold, Allyson E.; Hanna-Attisha, Mona; Lanphear, Bruce; Li, Helen Y.; Norton, Ruth Ann; Rosner, David; Walz, Kate (September 2, 2020). "Health Justice Strategies to Eradicate Lead Poisoning: An Urgent Call to Action to Safeguard Future Generations". Yale Journal of Health Policy, Law, and Ethics. 19 (2): 146–209.
- Saxe-Custack, Amy; Sadler, Richard; LaChance, Jenny; Hanna-Attisha, Mona; Ceja, Tiffany (June 12, 2020). "Participation in a Fruit and Vegetable Prescription Program for Pediatric Patients is Positively Associated with Farmers' Market Shopping". International Journal of Environmental Research and Public Health. 17 (12): 4202. doi:10.3390/ijerph17124202. PMC 7344709. PMID 32545578.
- Saxe-Custack, Amy; LaChance, Jenny; Hanna-Attisha, Mona (December 20, 2019). "Child Consumption of Whole Fruit and Fruit Juice Following Six Months of Exposure to a Pediatric Fruit and Vegetable Prescription Program". Nutrients. 12 (1): 25. doi:10.3390/nu12010025. PMC 7019436. PMID 31877635.
- Saxe-Custack, Amy; Lofton, Heather Claire; Hanna-Attisha, Mona; Tata, Zachary; Ceja, Tiffany; LaChance, Jenny (January 2019). "Caregiver Experiences With an Innovative Farmers' Market Incentive Program for Children in Flint, Michigan". Global Pediatric Health. 6: 2333794X1987098. doi:10.1177/2333794X19870989. PMC 6712753. PMID 31489342.
- Saxe-Custack, Amy; Goldsworthy, Mallory; Nweke, Onyinyechi (July 2019). "P67 Flint Kids Cook: Feasibility and Preliminary Effectiveness of a Cooking and Nutrition Education Program for Children". Journal of Nutrition Education and Behavior. 51 (7): S62–S63. doi:10.1016/j.jneb.2019.05.443. S2CID 199034511.
- Saxe-Custack, Amy; LaChance, Jenny; Hanna-Attisha, Mona; Ceja, Tiffany (June 25, 2019). "Fruit and Vegetable Prescriptions for Pediatric Patients Living in Flint, Michigan: A Cross-Sectional Study of Food Security and Dietary Patterns at Baseline". Nutrients. 11 (6): 1423. doi:10.3390/nu11061423. PMC 6627167. PMID 31242555.
- Saxe-Custack, Amy; Hanna-Attisha, Mona; Zvoch, Krista (June 1, 2019). "Fruit and Vegetable Prescriptions for Pediatric Patients in Flint, Michigan: Program Development, Methods, and Baseline Characteristics (FS02-05-19)". Current Developments in Nutrition. 3 (Supplement_1): nzz051.FS02–05–19. doi:10.1093/cdn/nzz051.FS02-05-19. PMC 6574763.
- Ruckart, Perri Zeitz; Ettinger, Adrienne S.; Hanna-Attisha, Mona; Jones, Nicole; Davis, Stephanie I.; Breysse, Patrick N. (January 2019). "The Flint Water Crisis: A Coordinated Public Health Emergency Response and Recovery Initiative". Journal of Public Health Management and Practice. 25 (1): S84–S90. doi:10.1097/PHH.0000000000000871. PMC 6309965. PMID 30507775.
- Benfer, Emily A.; Coffey, Emily; Gold, Allyson E.; Hanna-Attisha, Mona; Lanphear, Bruce; Li, Helen Y.; Norton, Ruth Ann; Rosner, David; Walz, Kate (February 7, 2020). "Duty to Protect: Enhancing the Federal Framework to Prevent Childhood Lead Poisoning and Exposure to Environmental Harm". Yale Journal of Health Policy, Law, and Ethics. 18 (2). ISSN 1648-1585.
- Hanna-Attisha, Mona; Lanphear, Bruce; Landrigan, Philip (November 2018). "Lead Poisoning in the 21st Century: The Silent Epidemic Continues". American Journal of Public Health. 108 (11): 1430. doi:10.2105/AJPH.2018.304725. PMC 6187797. PMID 30303719.
- Saxe-Custack, Amy; Lofton, Heather Claire; Hanna-Attisha, Mona; Victor, Colleen; Reyes, Gwendolyn; Ceja, Tiffany; LaChance, Jenny (September 2018). "Caregiver perceptions of a fruit and vegetable prescription programme for low-income paediatric patients". Public Health Nutrition. 21 (13): 2497–2506. doi:10.1017/S1368980018000964. PMC 10260820. PMID 29667562. S2CID 4942473.
- Hanna-Attisha, Mona (September 2018). "A Primer of Pediatric Environmental Health". American Journal of Public Health. 108 (9): 1115–1116. doi:10.2105/AJPH.2018.304594. PMC 6085048.
- Hanna-Attisha, Mona (May 2017). "Flint Kids: Tragic, Resilient, and Exemplary". American Journal of Public Health. 107 (5): 651–652. doi:10.2105/AJPH.2017.303732. PMC 5388977. PMID 28398787.
- Starmer, Amy J.; Spector, Nancy D.; West, Daniel C.; Srivastava, Rajendu; Sectish, Theodore C.; Landrigan, Christopher P.; Landrigan, Christopher P.; Spector, Nancy D.; Starmer, Amy J.; Sectish, Theodore C.; Srivastava, Rajendu; West, Daniel C.; Menon, Aravind Ajakumar; Ali, Arshia; Allair, Brenda K.; Allen, April D.; Almaddah, Nureddin; Alminde, Claire; Alvarado-Little, Wilma; Anson, Elizabeth; Ashland, Michele; Atsatt, Marisa; Aylor, Megan; Baird, Jennifer D.; Bale, James F.; Balmer, Dorene; Barber, Aisha; Barton, Kevin; Bates, Kimberly; Beck, Carolyn; Berchelmann, Kathleen; Bhan, Renuka; Bismilla, Zia; Blankenburg, Rebecca L.; Boa-Hocbo, Aileen; Bordin-Wosk, Talya; Brooks, Michelle; Calaman, Sharon; Campe, Julie; Campos, Maria Lucia; Chandler, Debra; Cheung, Yvonne; Choudhary, Amanda; Christensen, Eileen; Clark, Katherine; Coffey, Maitreya; Coghlan-McDonald, Sally; Cohen, Ellen; Cole, F. Sessions; Corless, Elizabeth; Cray, Sharon; Da Silva, Roxi; Dahale, Devesh; Dalal, Anuj K.; Destino, Lauren A.; Doroshow, Jonathan; Dreyer, Benard; duPont, Katharine; Eagle, Steven; Edgar-Zarate, Courtney; Etzenhouser, Angie; Everhart, Jennifer L.; Feraco, Angela M.; Ferrer, Alexandra; Galardy, Paul; Garcia, Briana M.; Gaspar-Oishi, Maria; Goldstein, Jenna; Good, Brian P.; Graham, Dionne A; Growdon, Amanda S.; Gubler, LeAnn; Guiot, Amy; Hanlon, Charin; Hanna-Attisha, Mona; Harris, Roben; Haskell, Helen; Hecht, Melvyn; Hehn, Rebecca S; Held, Justin; Hepps, Jennifer H.; Hillier, Debra; Hiraoka, Mark; Howell, Eric; Hrach, Christine; Hughes, Helen; Huskins, Charles; Kaatz, Scott; Kanala, Vishnu; Kantrowitz, Michael; Kaplan, Peter; Kashiwagi, Deanne; Kaul, Rajat; Keohane, Carol A.; Kern, Jeremy; Khan, Alisa; Khan, Nazia Naz S.; Kitch, Barry; Kocolas, Irene; Kothari, Lara; Kruvand, Elizabeth; Kuzma, Nicholas; Lacy, Mary; Lane, Michele; Langrish, Kate; Ledford, Christy J. W.; LeRoux, Laura; Lewis, Kheyandra; Lipsitz, Stuart; Litterer, Katherine P.; Lopreiato, Joseph O.; Lyons, Aimee; Mack, Avram; Mallouk, Meghan; Maloney, Christopher G.; Mangan, Amanda; Mann, Keith; Markle, Peggy; Marrese, Christine; Marseille, David; Maynard, Greg; Mehta, Bijal; Mendoza, Fernando; Mercer, Alexandra N.; Micalizzi, Dale; Mims, Lisa; Mittal, Vineeta; Mueller, Stephanie; Ngo, Thuy L.; Nolan, Ann; Nyenpan, Christopher; Obermeyer, Maria; O'Donnell, Katherine; O'Toole, Jennifer K.; Ottolini, Mary; Owolabi, Mobola; Patel, Aarti; Patel, Rajesh; Patel, Shilpa J.; Perron, Catherine; Pickler, Rita; Popa, Alina; Reppert, Patrick; Riss, Robert; Roesch, Justin; Rogers, Jayne E.; Rosenbluth, Glenn; Rothschild, Jeffrey M.; Sanders, Lee; Sauder, Kimberly; Schnipper, Jeff; Schnock, Kumiko O; Scholtz, Amy; Seltz, Barry; Serra, Theresa; Serwint, Janet; Shah, Samir; Sharma, Meesha; Sheppard, Kathleen; Simpkin, Arabella; Sloan, Karin A; Solan, Lauren G.; Southgate, Michael W; Spackman, Jaime Blank; Stevens, Scott M.; Stevenson, Adam; Stevenson, Windy; Subramony, Anupama; Surkis, William; Thangarasu, Sudhagar; Thompson, E. Douglas; Toole, Cheryl; Trueman, Laura; Trujillo, Tanner; Tse, Lisa; Turmelle, Michael P.; Vaniawala, Vishwas; Wagner, Tamara; Warnick, Cindy; Webster, John; Webster, Mary; Weinerman, Adina; Welch, Chelsea; White, Andrew J.; Wien, Matthew F.; Winn, Ariel S.; Wintch, Stephanie; Yin, H. Shonna; Yoon, Catherine S.; Yu, Clifton E.; Zampino, Dominick; Zigmont, Katherine R. (July 1, 2017). "Integrating Research, Quality Improvement, and Medical Education for Better Handoffs and Safer Care: Disseminating, Adapting, and Implementing the I-PASS Program". The Joint Commission Journal on Quality and Patient Safety. 43 (7): 319–329. doi:10.1016/j.jcjq.2017.04.001. ISSN 1553-7250. PMID 28648217.
- Taylor, D. Kay; Lepisto, Brenda Lovegrove; Lecea, Nicolas; Ghamrawi, Ranine; Bachuwa, Ghassan; LaChance, Jenny; Hanna-Attisha, Mona (March 2017). "Surveying Resident and Faculty Physician Knowledge, Attitudes, and Experiences in Response to Public Lead Contamination". Academic Medicine. 92 (3): 308–311. doi:10.1097/ACM.0000000000001562. PMID 28079728. S2CID 11128420.
- Sadler, Richard Casey; LaChance, Jenny; Hanna-Attisha, Mona (May 2017). "Social and Built Environmental Correlates of Predicted Blood Lead Levels in the Flint Water Crisis". American Journal of Public Health. 107 (5): 763–769. doi:10.2105/AJPH.2017.303692. PMC 5388956. PMID 28323469.
- Hanna-Attisha, Mona; LaChance, Jenny (December 2016). "Hanna-Attisha and LaChance Respond". American Journal of Public Health. 106 (12): e6–e7. doi:10.2105/AJPH.2016.303487. PMC 5105021. PMID 27831790.
- Hanna-Attisha, Mona; LaChance, Jenny (June 2016). "Hanna-Attisha and LaChance Respond". American Journal of Public Health. 106 (6): e1–e2. doi:10.2105/AJPH.2016.303184. PMC 4880222. PMID 27153023.
- Hanna-Attisha, Mona; Kuehn, Bridget M. (March 8, 2016). "Pediatrician Sees Long Road Ahead for Flint After Lead Poisoning Crisis". JAMA. 315 (10): 967–969. doi:10.1001/jama.2016.1034. PMID 26886471.
- Hanna-Attisha, M; LaChance, J; Sadler, RC; Champney Schnepp, A (February 2016). "Elevated Blood Lead Levels in Children Associated With the Flint Drinking Water Crisis: A Spatial Analysis of Risk and Public Health Response". American Journal of Public Health. 106 (2): 283–290. doi:10.2105/AJPH.2015.303003. PMC 4985856. PMID 26691115.
- Chaudhry, Sarah R.; Hanna-Attisha, Mona; LaChance, Jenny; Reyes, Gwendolyn; Aririguzo, Judenia; Fadl, Hytham (June 1, 2015). "Primary Resident Physician: Improving Continuity of Care". Journal of Graduate Medical Education. 7 (2): 291–292. doi:10.4300/JGME-D-14-00694.1. PMC 4512816. PMID 26221461.
- Tsuneta, Taeko; Loch-Caruso, Rita; Quensen, John F.; Boyd, Stephen A.; Hanna, Mona; Grindatti, Carmen (June 2008). "Stimulatory effects of a microbially dechlorinated polychlorinated biphenyl (PCB) mixture on rat uterine contraction in vitro". Environmental Research. 107 (2): 185–193. Bibcode:2008ER....107..185T. doi:10.1016/j.envres.2008.01.011. PMC 2699757. PMID 18359014.
