= Montana Free Press =

American non-profit news organization

- Founded: 2016
- Founder: John S. Adams
- Type: Non-profit organization
- Purpose: State government, politics, economic journalism
- Location: Helena, Montana, United States
- Region served: Montana
- Key people: John S. Adams, Brad Tyer, Eric Dietrich
- Website: montanafreepress.org

The Montana Free Press (MTFP) is an American non-profit news organization based in Helena, Montana. As an investigative journalism organization, it focuses on uncovering non-transparent bureaucratic processes and institutions.

== History ==
The Montana Free Press was founded in 2016 by journalist John S. Adams, who had previously worked as the capital bureau chief for The Great Falls Tribune in 2015. Prior to both, Adams was a staff reporter at the Missoula Independent.

In 2018, Montana Free Press founder Adams was featured in the documentary film Dark Money, which premiered at the 2018 Sundance Film Festival. The film uncovered the influences of undisclosed corporate "dark money" on elections, while delving deep into investigative topics such as how the funding from American Tradition Partnership influenced Montana state and federal election laws.

== Coverage ==
The Montana Free Press focuses on the government and policy of the State of Montana, as well as on issues relating to the economy, environment, energy, health care, and social justice. Investigative news from Montana Free Press includes articles on solitary confinement in Montana state prisons, lobbying from right to work organizations, state budget cuts' effects on rural areas of Montana, and water supply in Fort Peck Indian Reservation, among other topics.

== See also ==
- Institute for Nonprofit News (member)
- Wisconsin Center for Investigative Journalism
- Center for Public Integrity
- The Colorado Independent
- Honolulu Civil Beat
- Madison365
- The Marshall Project
- Jon Ralston
