= Royal Oak, Michigan =

- City
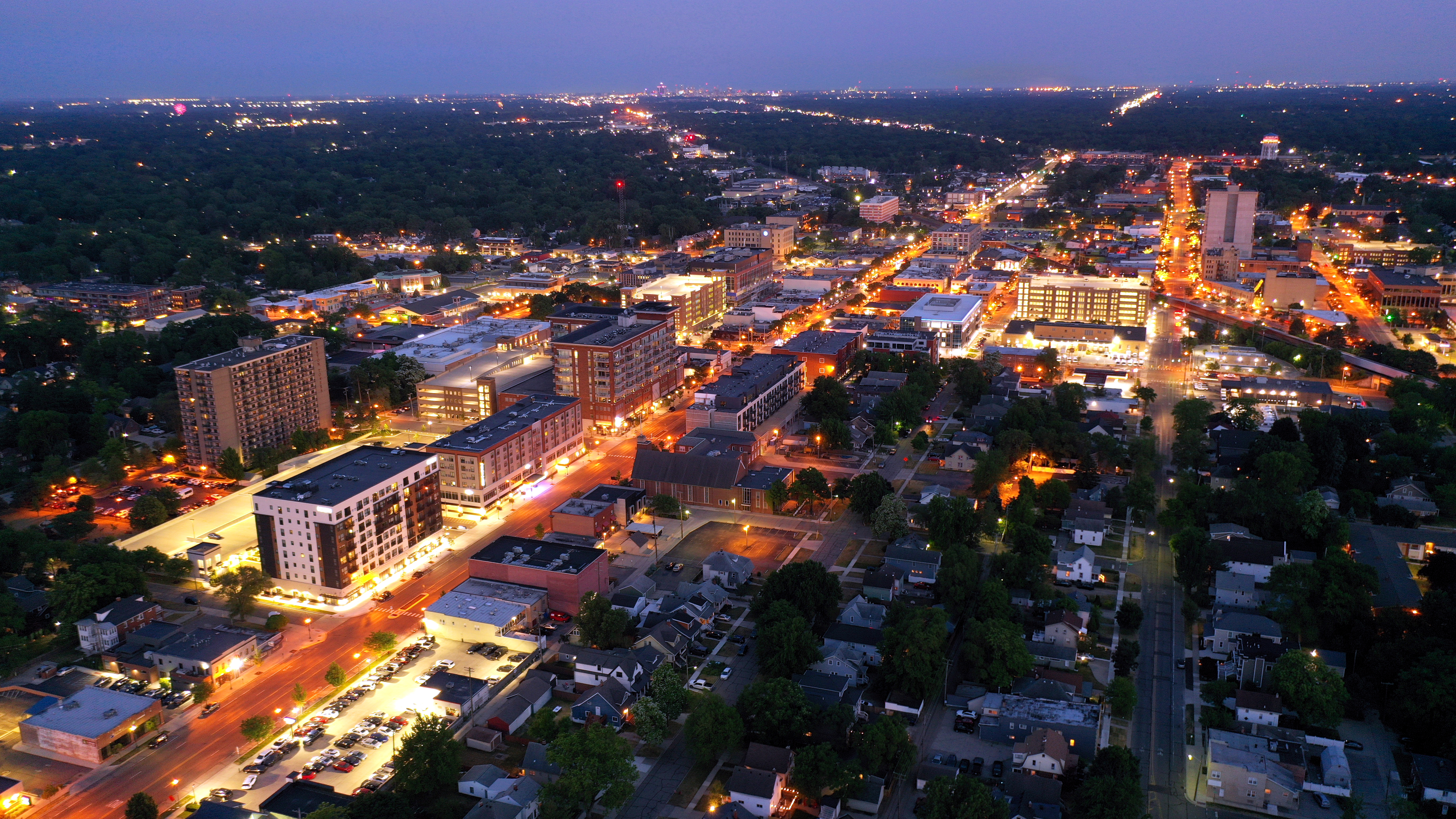
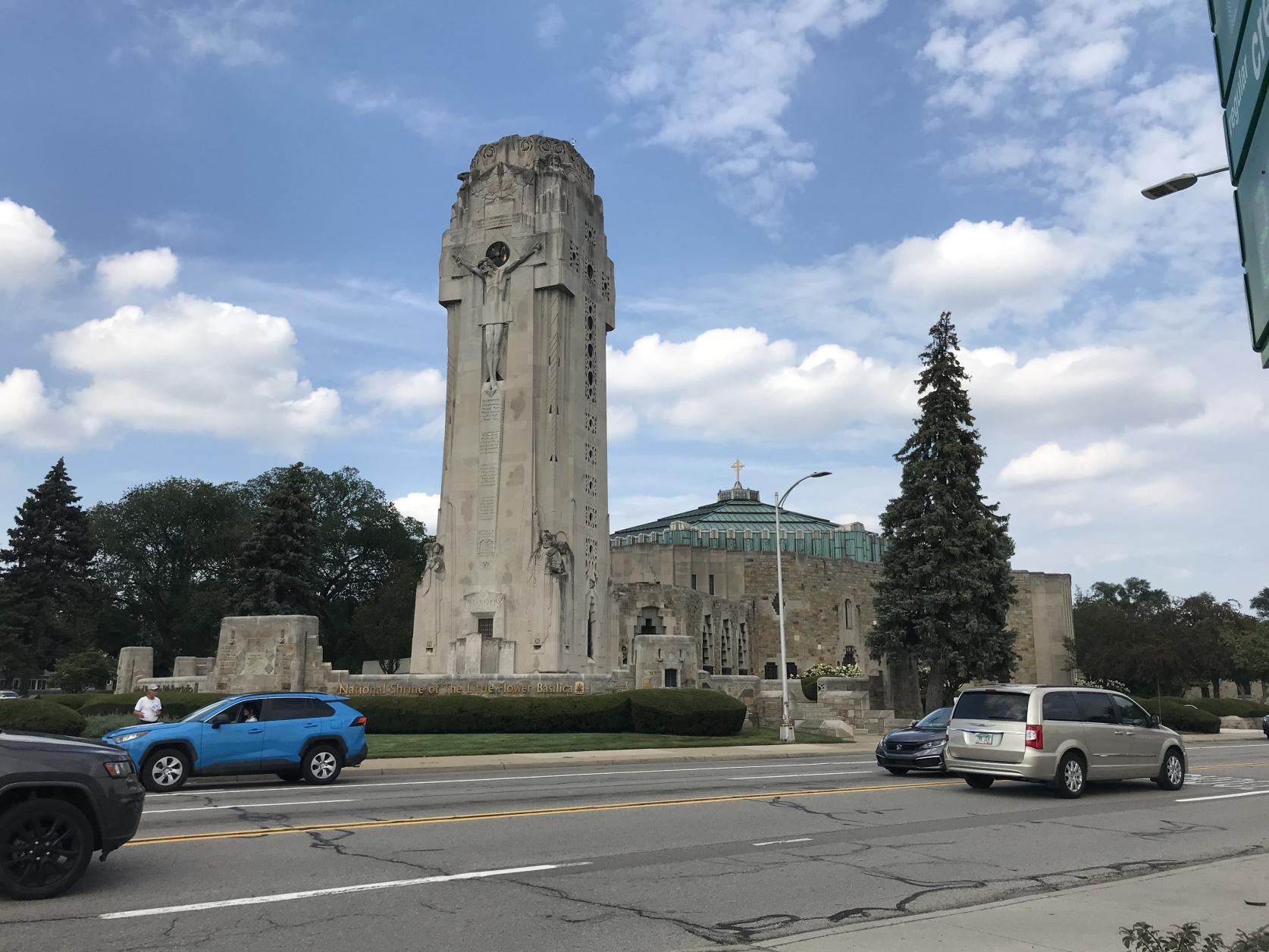
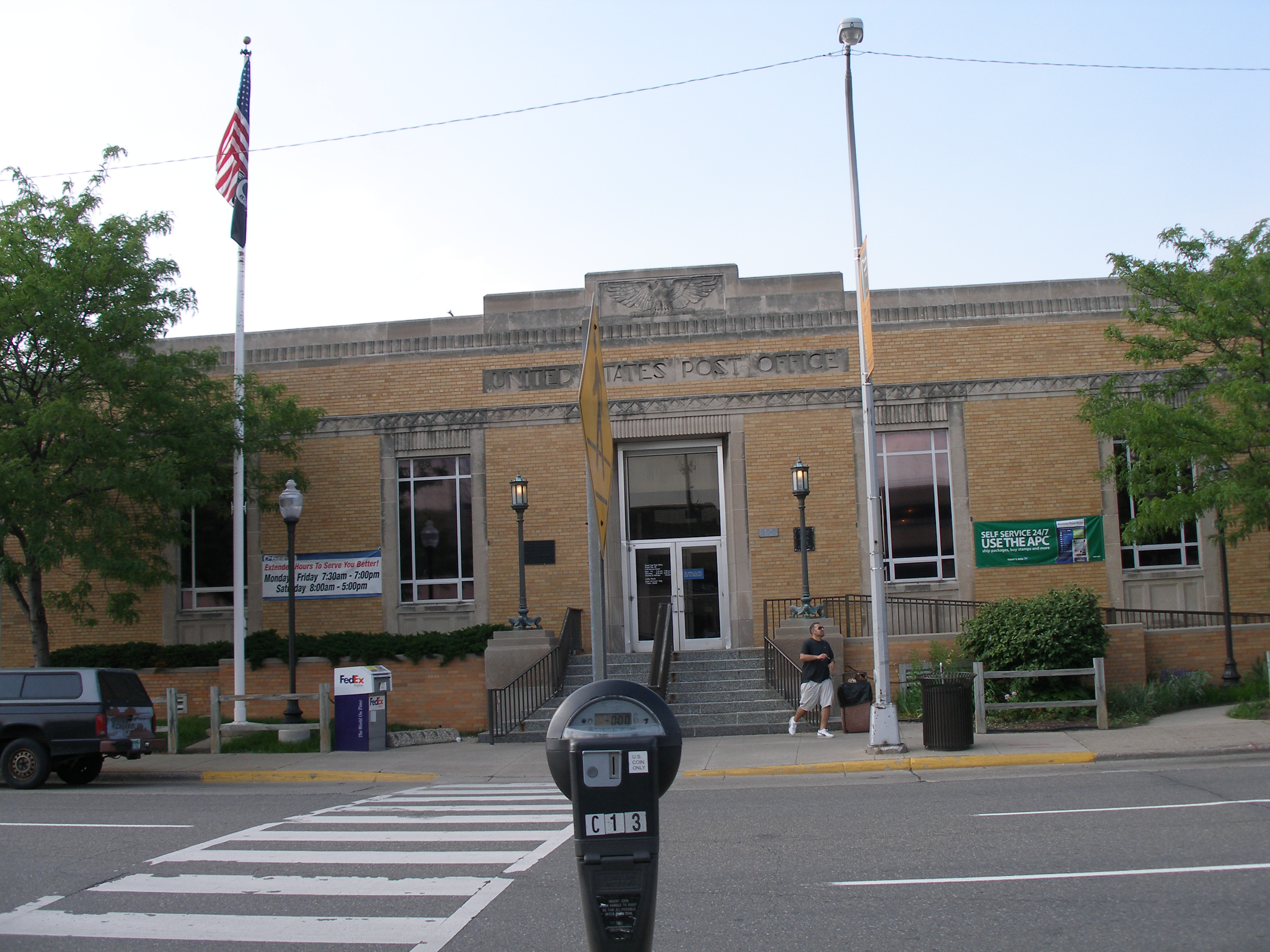
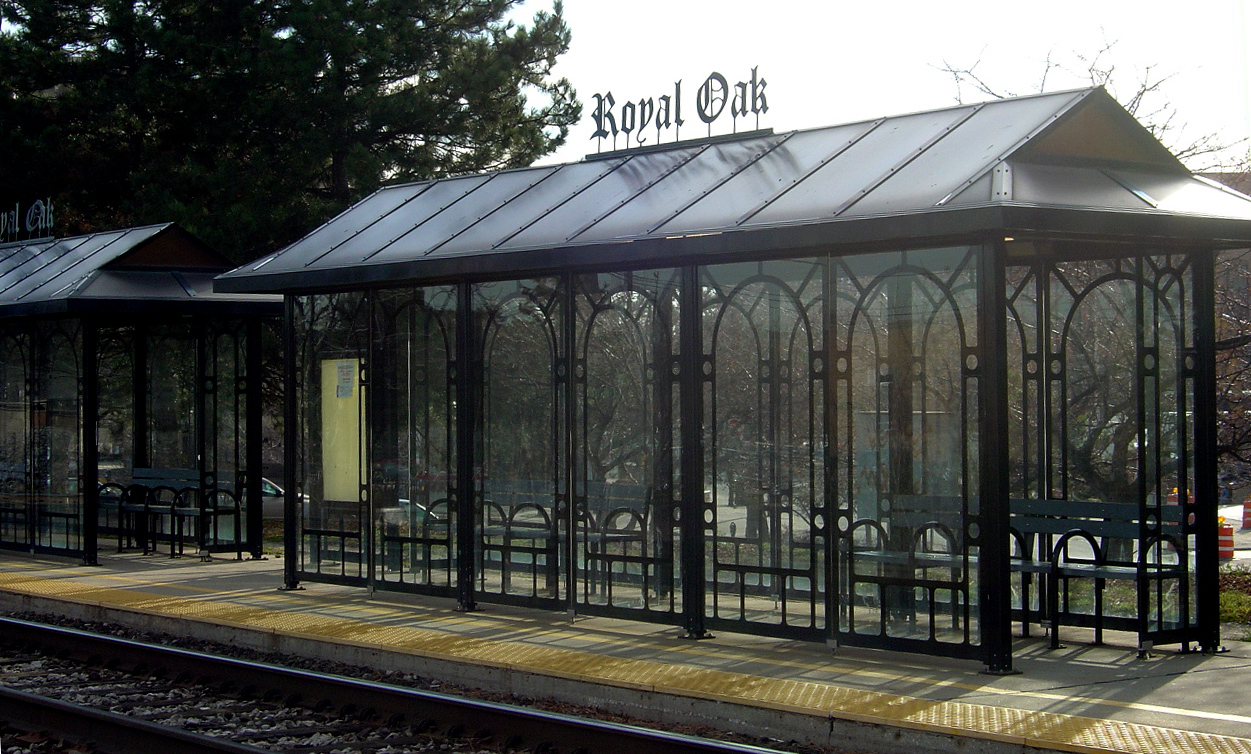
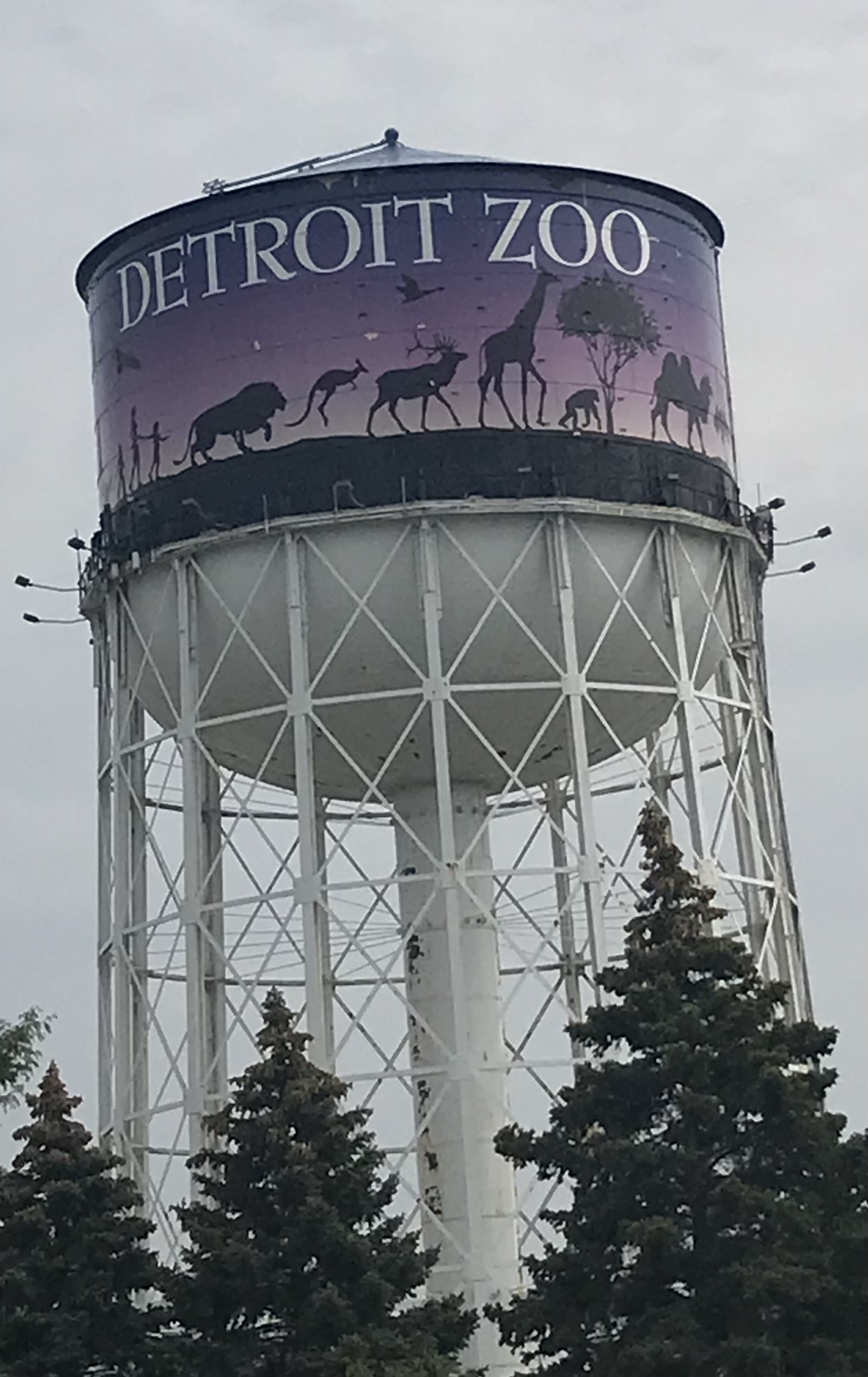
- Pictured top to bottom, left to right: Downtown Royal Oak, the National Shrine of the Little Flower, Royal Oak Post Office, the Royal Oak Amtrak station, and the Detroit Zoo water tower

- Official Logo
- Nicknames: The City of Trees, Roak
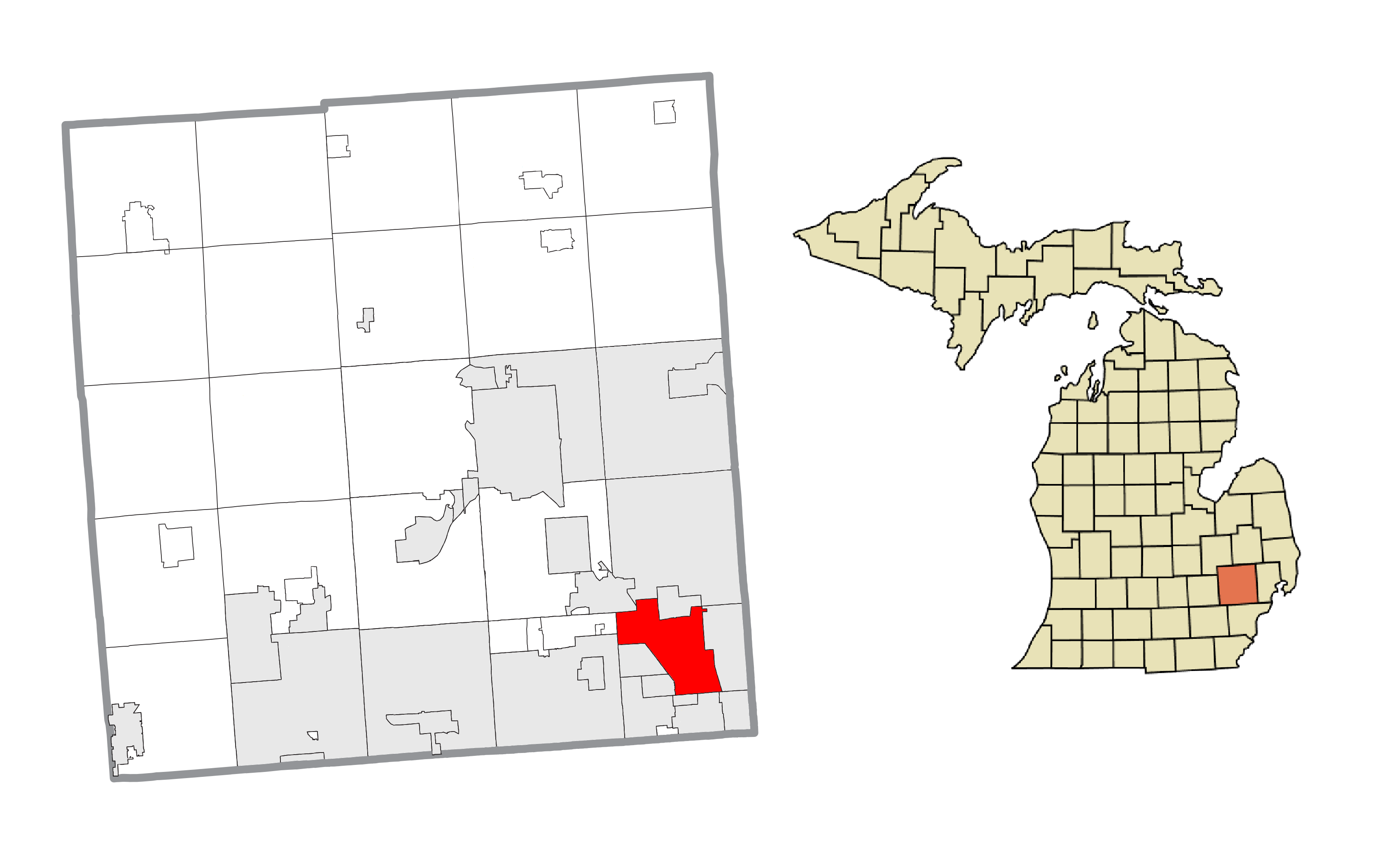
- Location within Oakland County

- Location within the state of Michigan
- Coordinates: 42°29′20″N 83°08′34″W
- Country: United States
- State: Michigan
- County: Oakland
- Incorporated: 1891 (village); 1921 (city)

Government
  - Type: Council–manager
  - Mayor: Mike Fournier (D)
  - Manager: Paul Brake

Area
  - City: 11.80 sq mi (30.55 km^{2})
  - Land: 11.79 sq mi (30.54 km^{2})
  - Water: 0 sq mi (0.00 km^{2})
- Elevation: 663 ft (202 m)

Population (2020)
  - City: 58,211
  - Density: 4,936.4/sq mi (1,905.96/km^{2})
  - Metro: 4,296,250 (Metro Detroit)
- Time zone: UTC-5 (EST)
  - Summer (DST): UTC-4 (EDT)
- ZIP code(s): 48067, 48068, 48073; 48069 (Pleasant Ridge); 48071 (Madison Heights)
- Area codes: 248 and 947
- FIPS code: 26-70040
- GNIS feature ID: 636352
- Website: romi.gov

Royal Oak is a city in Oakland County in the U.S. state of Michigan. An inner-ring suburb of Detroit, Royal Oak is located roughly 10 miles (16.1 km) north of downtown Detroit. As of the 2020 census, the city had a population of 58,211.

Royal Oak is located along the Woodward Corridor, and is served by Interstate 75 and Interstate 696. The city has one of the largest downtowns in Detroit's suburbs, and is also home to much of the Detroit Zoo, with portions extending into neighboring Huntington Woods. Royal Oak describes itself as the "city of trees".

== History ==
Royal Oak was named in 1819, during one of the surveying expeditions led by Territorial Governor Lewis Cass. A large oak tree at this small settlement reminded Cass of the story of the Royal Oak, where King Charles II of England, Scotland and Ireland hid to escape capture by the Roundheads after the Battle of Worcester, so he chose that name for the settlement.

Royal Oak was not incorporated as a village until 1891. It was reincorporated a city in 1921.

=== 20th century to present ===
Royal Oak developed as a suburb of Detroit in the early 20th century, following Detroit's booming growth as a result of industrialization and its auto industry.

The Royal Oak Farmers Market opened as a truck market, at the corner of 4th and Troy streets, on October 14, 1925, as a cooperative venture between the then-new City of Royal Oak and Oakland County, Michigan. There were still numerous farmers in the county. The present structure, at the corner of 11 Mile Road and Troy Street, is adjacent to the 44th District Court. It was erected in the spring of 1927 and dedicated July 1 of that year.

In the 1920s, Father Charles Coughlin, a Canadian Catholic priest who relocated to Detroit, became the founding pastor of the Shrine of the Little Flower, now a prominent landmark in the city. Through his ministry, he raised funds to build the present limestone church complex and tower. Initially he broadcast religious speeches from this site.

During the 1930s, his broadcasts became more political. He initially supported President Franklin D. Roosevelt, then opposed him and promoted the causes of the fascist leaders of Germany and Italy. The Roosevelt administration closed down his radio operation after the outbreak of World War II, with support from the Catholic hierarchy. Coughlin had developed national political influence and had an increasingly anti-semitic message, at a time when Jewish people were being severely persecuted in Germany.

In 1991, Thomas McIlvane, a postal worker, killed five people in Royal Oak's post office, after being fired from the Postal Service for "insubordination." This incident helped to popularize the term "going postal."

The downtown originally had a typical mixture of small-scale retail and trade to serve the city of Royal Oak. With the development of the highway system in the postwar period, it lost business to suburban malls. Since the late 1990s and early 2000s, however, Royal Oak's downtown has developed as an entertainment and nightlife destination. A number of large condominiums and lofts have been built in the area, increasing the density of the downtown population. In 2022, the Royal Oak City Commission approved the demolition of the historic Main Art Theater, once a symbol of movie goers in the area.

== Geography ==
According to the United States Census Bureau, the city has a total area of 11.79 square miles (30.54 km^{2}), of which 11.78 square miles (30.51 km^{2}) is land and 0.01 square miles (0.03 km^{2}) (0.08%) is water.

Royal Oak developed around a river, the Red Run. Vinsetta Boulevard was built skirting a source branch of the Red Run for its median. In the 1930s, Vinsetta's entire median, along with the river and all but the tops of the bridges for the crossing streets were filled in as part of a WPA project during the Great Depression. During 1967–68, the rest of the river in Oakland County was buried within a six-foot drain pipe.

Extensive tree-planting has taken place since the 1930s, leading to the town being nicknamed "The City of Trees", although recent increased developments have caused controversy about the maintenance of the city's urban forest.

== Demographics ==
Historical population
| Census | Pop. | Note | %± |
|---|---|---|---|
| 1880 | 217 | | — |
| 1900 | 468 | | — |
| 1910 | 1,071 | | 128.8% |
| 1920 | 6,007 | | 460.9% |
| 1930 | 22,904 | | 281.3% |
| 1940 | 25,087 | | 9.5% |
| 1950 | 46,898 | | 86.9% |
| 1960 | 80,612 | | 71.9% |
| 1970 | 86,238 | | 7.0% |
| 1980 | 70,893 | | −17.8% |
| 1990 | 65,410 | | −7.7% |
| 2000 | 60,062 | | −8.2% |
| 2010 | 57,236 | | −4.7% |
| 2020 | 58,211 | | 1.7% |

=== 2020 census ===
As of the 2020 census, Royal Oak had a population of 58,211. The median age was 36.7 years. 5.4% of residents were under the age of 5, 15.0% were under the age of 18, and 15.5% were 65 years of age or older. For every 100 females there were 101.4 males, and for every 100 females age 18 and over there were 101.2 males age 18 and over.

100.0% of residents lived in urban areas, while 0.0% lived in rural areas.

There were 29,364 households in Royal Oak, of which 17.6% had children under the age of 18 living in them. Of all households, 36.6% were married-couple households, 26.5% were households with a male householder and no spouse or partner present, and 28.9% were households with a female householder and no spouse or partner present. About 42.3% of all households were made up of individuals and 11.8% had someone living alone who was 65 years of age or older.

There were 31,244 housing units, of which 6.0% were vacant. The homeowner vacancy rate was 1.2% and the rental vacancy rate was 8.2%.

Racial composition as of the 2020 census
| Race | Number | Percent |
|---|---|---|
| White | 49,954 | 85.8% |
| Black or African American | 2,137 | 3.7% |
| American Indian and Alaska Native | 127 | 0.2% |
| Asian | 1,893 | 3.3% |
| Native Hawaiian and Other Pacific Islander | 14 | 0.0% |
| Some other race | 561 | 1.0% |
| Two or more races | 3,525 | 6.1% |
| Hispanic or Latino (of any race) | 2,140 | 3.7% |

The median income for a household in the city was $95,182, and the median income for a family was $132,702. The employment rate was 72.5%. 62.6% of residents have a bachelor's degree or higher. About 6.0% of the population were below the poverty line, including 3.9% of those under age 18 and 8.9% of those age 65 or over.

=== 2010 census ===
As of the census of 2010, there were 57,236 people, 28,063 households, and 13,394 families living in the city. The population density was 4,854.6 inhabitants per square mile (1,874.4/km^{2}). There were 30,207 housing units at an average density of 2,562.1 per square mile (989.2/km^{2}). The racial makeup of the city was 90.7% White, 4.3% African American, 0.3% Native American, 2.4% Asian American, 0.4% from other races, and 1.9% from two or more races. Hispanic or Latino residents of any race were 2.3% of the population.

There were 28,063 households, of which 20.0% had children under the age of 18 living with them, 36.7% were married couples living together, 8.1% had a female householder with no husband present, 3.0% had a male householder with no wife present, and 52.3% were non-families. 41.4% of all households were made up of individuals, and 10.7% had someone living alone who was 65 years of age or older. The average household size was 2.03 and the average family size was 2.82.

The median age in the city was 37.8 years. 16.7% of residents were under the age of 18; 7.6% were between the ages of 18 and 24; 35.9% were from 25 to 44; 26.8% were from 45 to 64; and 13.1% were 65 years of age or older. The gender makeup of the city was 49.0% male and 51.0% female.

=== 2000 census ===
As of the census of 2000, there were 60,062 people, 28,880 households, and 14,440 families living in the city. The population density was 5,083.0 inhabitants per square mile (1,962.6/km^{2}). There were 29,942 housing units at an average density of 2,534.0 per square mile (978.4/km^{2}). The racial makeup of the city was 94.80% White, 1.54% African American, 0.26% Native American, 1.56% Asian, 0.05% Pacific Islander, 0.38% from other races, and 1.40% from two or more races. Hispanic or Latino residents of any race were 1.30% of the population.

There were 28,880 households, out of which 20.4% had children under the age of 18 living with them, 39.9% were married couples living together, 7.5% had a female householder with no husband present, and 50.0% were non-families. 40.8% of all households were made up of individuals, and 11.6% had someone living alone who was 65 years of age or older. The average household size was 2.06 and the average family size was 2.86.

In the city, 17.8% of the population was under the age of 18, 7.5% was from 18 to 24, 38.8% from 25 to 44, 21.0% from 45 to 64, and 14.9% was 65 years of age or older. The median age was 37 years. For every 100 females, there were 95.3 males. For every 100 females age 18 and over, there were 92.6 males.

The median income for a household in the city was $52,252, and the median income for a family was $68,109. Males had a median income of $50,562 versus $36,392 for females. The per capita income for the city was $30,990. About 2.0% of families and 4.3% of the population were below the poverty line, including 3.4% of those under age 18 and 5.5% of those age 65 or over.

=== Crime ===
Royal Oak has a below-average crime rate, similar to that of nearby middle-class communities, such as Berkley and Madison Heights. Larceny-theft was the most common crime, making up 66.7% of all crimes in the city. Five known murders have been committed since 2000, one in 2004, one in 2005, one in 2010, and two in 2011.

== Economy ==
Royal Oak developed initially as a suburb after Detroit boomed as a major industrial city. Residents of Detroit began to move to the suburbs for newer housing, and to separate themselves from the rising tensions and riots in Detroit, in a process referred to as white flight. It had a compact, traditional street-side shopping district, which runs along Main Street and Washington Avenue downtown. During the 2000s, this area was redeveloped with numerous new businesses, and is now considered a trendy, upscale, urban-chic district, featuring restaurants, shopping, and entertainment. A number of mixed-use high-rise developments have been constructed — mostly condo "lofts" with retail and office space on the lower levels.

Points of interest include the Detroit Zoo, a major regional tourist attraction, the Corewell Health William Beaumont University Hospital, the Royal Oak Music Theatre, the Baldwin Theatre, Mark Ridley's Comedy Castle, a location of Emagine Entertainment, and shops, cafes, and restaurants.

The National Arbor Day Foundation has awarded Royal Oak the distinction of "Tree City USA" every year since 1976 as a result of the city's commitment to tree planting and preservation.

The Gilda Radner Hereditary Cancer Program is a foundation set up by Detroit-area native Gilda Radner, who is known for her work as a comedian of Saturday Night Live. In 1998 the Program created a free cancer support community for people with cancer, their families, and friends. Gilda's Club Metro Detroit operates a three-story non-residential house in Royal Oak. It has served more than 3,000 members for social and emotional support through a variety of activities.

== Arts and culture ==
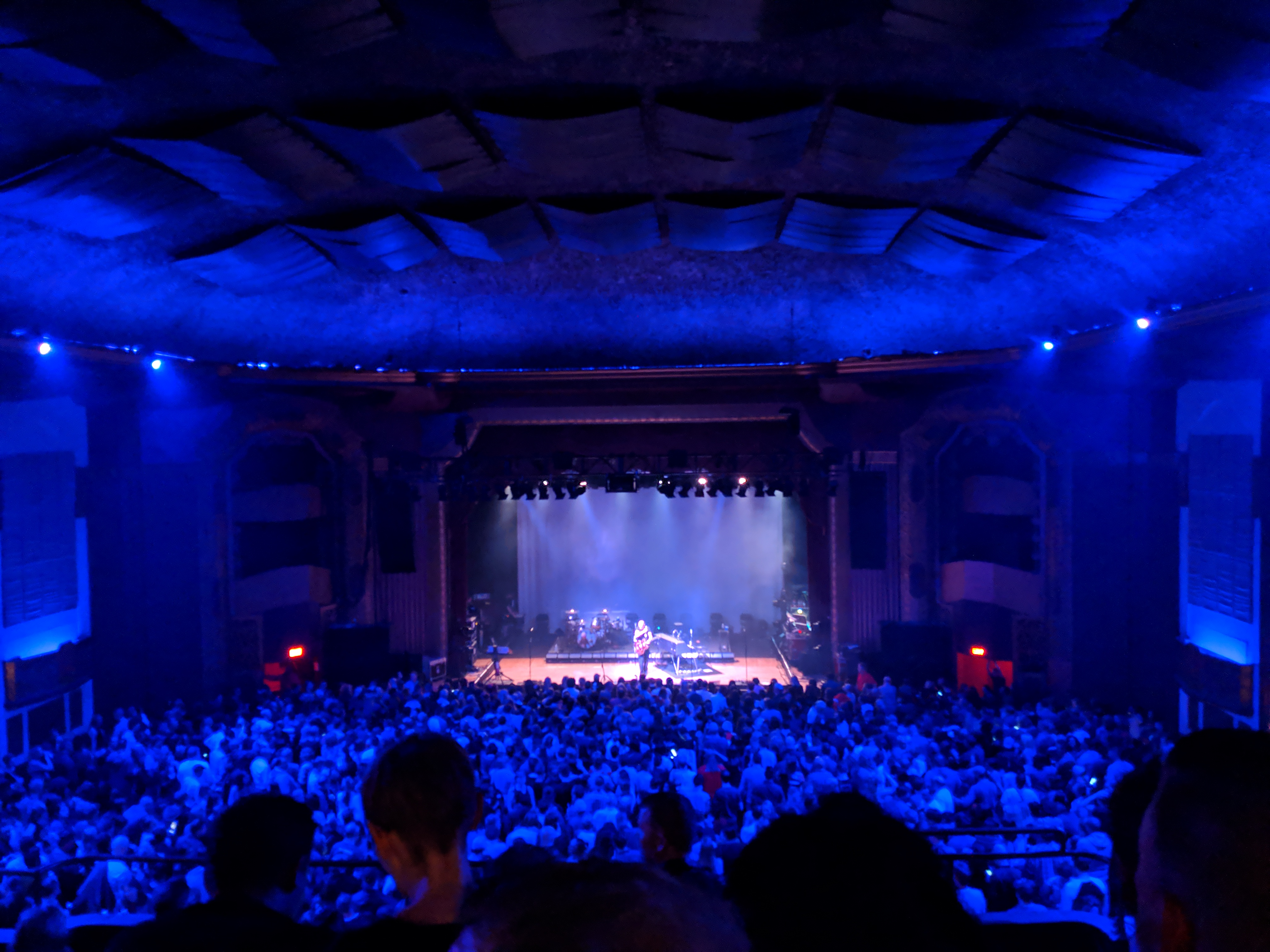
The Royal Oak Music Theatre

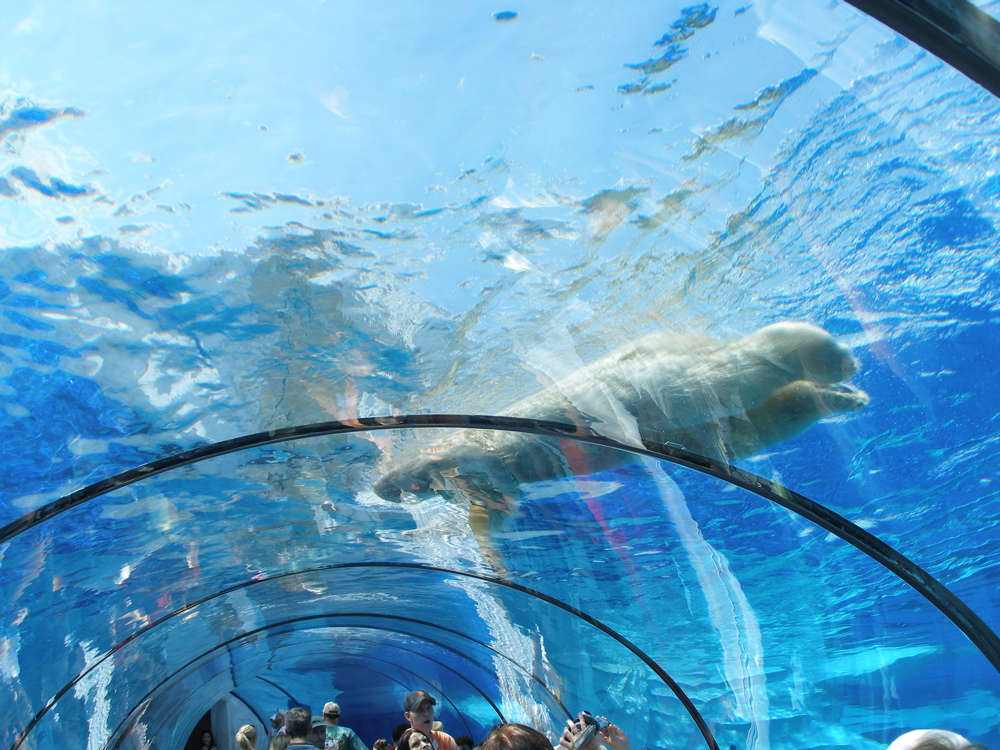
The Detroit Zoo's Arctic Ring of Life

Downtown Royal Oak features a wide assortment of nightlife venues, including the Royal Oak Music Theatre and the Baldwin Theatre. Mark Ridley's Comedy Castle, a comedy club, was an early venue for performers such as Tim Allen and Dave Coulier. Allen's connections to Royal Oak would later in his career be alluded to in the sitcom Home Improvement as the protagonist's (played by Allen) place of residence.

Royal Oak encompasses a major span of the Woodward Dream Cruise. The city sponsors ancillary events around the Cruise. It is the site of the Detroit Zoo, one of the region's leading tourist attractions.

=== Sports ===
Royal Oak is home to the Royal Oak Leprechauns, a collegiate summer league baseball team that competes in the Northwoods League. The Leprechauns play their home games at Memorial Park. The 2026 Leprechauns, skippered by former MLB standout D.J. LeMahieu, were crowned champions of the 26-team league.

=== Arts, Beats & Eats ===
Arts, Beats & Eats is a U.S. Labor Day Weekend festival held in Royal Oak. Prior to 2010 it was held in downtown Pontiac, Michigan streets in storefront businesses and at the Phoenix Plaza Amphitheatre. The festival is sponsored by local businesses, including Ford, the naming sponsor. Proceeds from Arts, Beats & Eats benefit local charities; an estimated 1.7 million was donated in the first seven years.

A juried arts exhibition, food court, concert stages with local and national acts and a charity preview gala highlight festival programming.

=== Religion ===
Previously Royal Oak had St. Dennis Catholic Church of the Detroit Archdiocese; in 2012 it began the process of merging into St. Vincent Ferrer Church in Madison Heights. The real estate was later redeveloped as a location of grocery store chain Kroger.

Royal Oak is home to the National Shrine of the Little Flower Basilica, which was declared a national shrine in 1998 by the United States Conference of Catholic Bishops. Later in 2014, Pope Francis granted the National Shrine of the Little Flower the honorary title of ‘Minor Basilica’.

== Government ==
Royal Oak has a Council–manager government. It is governed by a city commission consisting of a mayor and six commission members. The city commission appoints a city manager, who manages the day-to-day operations of the city.

== Education ==
The city is served by Royal Oak Schools. Private K–12 education is also offered by Shrine of the Little Flower Catholic Church while nearby St. Mary's offers K–8 instruction. A branch of Oakland Community College is located in the city and a new location of Baker College is nearing the end of construction.

A portion of land in the city is zoned to Berkley Public Schools.

In recent years Royal Oak has begun to consolidate its public schools in response to a decline in enrollment levels compared to the baby boom era. In 2006, the city's two public high schools, George A. Dondero High School and Clarence M. Kimball High School, were combined into a new Royal Oak High School. Beginning in 2007, the city's two middle schools were combined into one school, Royal Oak Middle School, in the former Dondero building. The number of elementary schools was reduced to six. Some parents protested the planned closure and demolition of Longfellow and Whittier elementary schools. They were seeking to have them considered for historic district recognition by way of signed petition. Despite their efforts, both schools and a number of other former elementary schools were demolished in the fall of 2007.

The Royal Oak school system gained brief notoriety for an incident following the Trump election. Some middle schoolers chanted "build that wall". A student video of the incident was widely shared on Facebook, attracting more than 4 million views within 24 hours. A week later a noose was found in the 8th grade boys bathroom at the middle school. The student who had placed the noose in the bathroom was removed from the school shortly afterward.

St. Dennis School of the Roman Catholic Archdiocese of Detroit was formerly in Royal Oak. It closed in 2011.

== Media ==
In addition to The Detroit News and Detroit Free Press, regional newspapers serving all of southeast Michigan, the city is served by the Daily Tribune, The Oakland Press, the Royal Oak Review, and The Mirror. In 2008, the video production company M-1 Studios launched in Royal Oak before expanding production space to Ferndale in 2013.

== Infrastructure ==
=== Transportation ===
==== Numbered highways ====
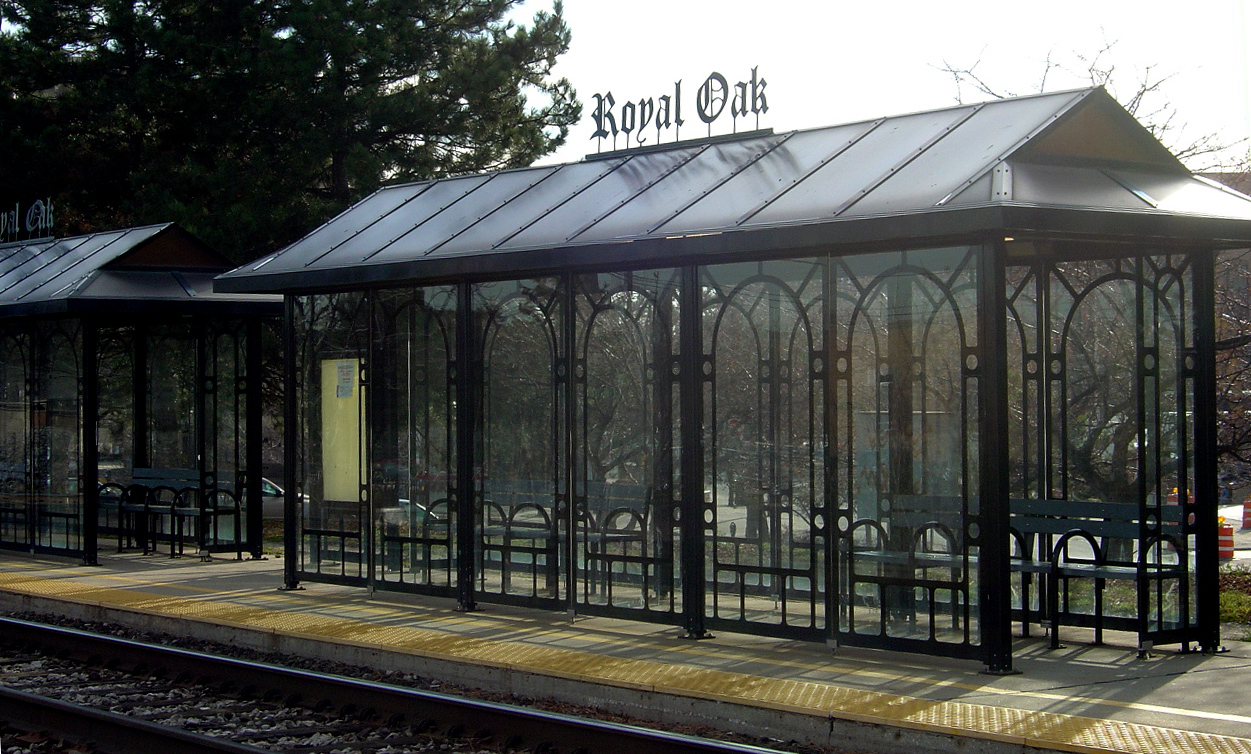
Royal Oak train platform

- I-75 runs north–south along the city's east side.
- I-696 runs east–west along the city's south side.
- M-1 (formerly designated US 10 and also known as Woodward Avenue) runs generally southeast–northwest along the city's west side.
- Five numbered east–west mile roads run through Royal Oak.

==== Rail and bus ====
- Amtrak provides service to Royal Oak, operating its Wolverine three times daily in both directions between Pontiac and Chicago via Detroit.
- Class one freight rail service is provided by Canadian National Railway (CN).
- Suburban Mobility Authority for Regional Transportation (SMART) operates local and regional bus transit.

==== Historical ====
- Commuter rail service, provided by Grand Trunk Western Railroad (GTW) and later Southeastern Michigan Transportation Authority (SEMTA) from Pontiac to downtown Detroit, with two stops in Royal Oak, ran until October 17, 1983.
- The Saginaw Trail was a footpath established by the Sauk tribe between Detroit and Saginaw. In Royal Oak present-day Main Street and Crooks Road were developed along the historic path.

=== Police and fire ===
Royal Oak's police department has 79 sworn officers and 25 civilian personnel. The department employs community policing techniques.

Royal Oak has a full-time fire department that operates three stations strategically located around the city to minimize response time to incidents. The ROFD staffs three engines, a ladder truck, and two ALS ambulances daily and is a member of the OAKWAY mutual aid consortium.

== Notable people ==
- Alexandra Aldridge, figure skater, was born in Royal Oak
- Henry Banks, racing driver, was raised in Royal Oak
- Mary Barra, chairman and CEO of General Motors Company, was born in Royal Oak
- Freddie Braun, soccer player
- Bruce Campbell, film and television actor, was born in Royal Oak
- Shiann Darkangelo, ice hockey player in the PWHL
- Meryl Davis, figure skater, winner of gold medal at 2014 Winter Olympic Games in Sochi, silver medalist in 2010
- Pete Dawkins, winner of college football's 1958 Heisman Trophy, military officer, and political candidate, was born in Royal Oak
- Marie Donigan, landscape architect and former member of the Michigan House of Representatives
- Andrew Dost American musician, singer and is member of the indie rock band Fun.
- Terry Duerod, University of Detroit and NBA basketball player, was born in Royal Oak
- Mona Hanna-Attisha, pediatrician and Flint Water Crisis whistleblower, was raised in Royal Oak
- Kirk Ferentz, football head coach for University of Iowa (1999–present), was born in Royal Oak
- Dean Fertita, rock musician from the band Pyre and Reigndance
- Bill Freehan, Major League Baseball catcher who was an 11× MLB All Star, 5× gold glove winner, and 1968 World Series champion. Spent all of his 15 seasons playing with the Detroit Tigers, grew up in Royal Oak.
- Jeffrey Frame a professor of atmospheric sciences at the University of Illinois was raised in Royal Oak and attended Kimball High School
- Glenn Frey, founding member of rock group the Eagles, was raised in Royal Oak and attended Dondero High School
- Christopher George, actor, star of films and TV series The Rat Patrol, was born in Royal Oak
- Jason Grilli, Major League Baseball pitcher, was born in Royal Oak
- Judith Guest, author of Ordinary People, lived and attended school in Royal Oak
- David Hahn, notable for attempting to construct a homemade nuclear reactor, was born in Royal Oak.
- Tom Hayden, was born in Royal Oak and attended Dondero High School. He is best known as an author of the Port Huron Statement, and he stood for trial in the Chicago Seven case. He was at one time married to Jane Fonda.
- Jon Husted, U.S. senator for Ohio
- Jack Kevorkian, practiced physician-assisted suicide in Royal Oak
- Keegan-Michael Key, film and television actor, attended Shrine Catholic High School in Royal Oak
- Melanie Macey, mayor of Royal Oak, state representative.
- Mallory McMorrow, Politician, lives in Royal Oak
- Torey Krug, NHL defenseman, was born in Royal Oak
- T. J. Lang, pro football player for Green Bay Packers, Detroit Lions, was born in Royal Oak
- Sam Raimi, film director, producer, writer, actor, was born in Royal Oak
- Ivan Raimi, physician and screenwriter, was born in Royal Oak
- Kim Rancourt, Rock Musician
- Terrell Ransom Jr., actor
- Elisabeth Robinson, author of The True and Outstanding Adventures of the Hunt Sisters
- Sebastian Sauve, Fashion model
- Chris Savino, animator, creator of the Nickelodeon animated series The Loud House.
- Frank Dennis Saylor IV, judge, was born in Royal Oak
- Jim Seymour, wide receiver for Notre Dame and Chicago Bears, attended Shrine Catholic High School in Royal Oak
- Brady Smith, NFL defensive end 1996–2005, was born in Royal Oak
- Marshall Thompson, actor, star of films and television, died in Royal Oak
- Al Watrous, golf professional
- Charlie White, ice dancer, winner of gold medal at 2014 Winter Olympic Games in Sochi, silver medalist in 2010

== See also ==
- Woodward Corridor
- Architecture of metropolitan Detroit
- Detroit Zoo
- Tourism in metropolitan Detroit
- 1970 Memorial Park riot
