= Royal Oak High School =

High school in Royal Oak, Michigan, United States

Location
- 1500 Lexington Boulevard; Royal Oak, Michigan 480735; United States; 42°31′22″N 83°9′46″W

Information
- Type: Public high school
- Established: Originally in 1913 and was located on South Washington Street (later renamed Dondero High) Current site opened 1957 as Kimball, then rebranded as ROHS in 2006 after the combining of Kimball and Dondero
- School district: Royal Oak Schools
- Principal: Donal Loomis
- Teaching staff: 98.72 (FTE)
- Grades: 9–12
- Enrollment: 1,341 (2022–23)
- Student to teacher ratio: 13.58
- Colors: Black, Royal Blue, and Silver
- Mascot: Ravens
- Website: rohs.royaloakschools.org

Student assessments
- 2021–22 school year Change vs. prior year

M-STEP 11th grade proficiency rates (Science / Social Studies)
- Advanced %: 24.7 / 19.2
- Proficient %: 32.9 / 37.7
- PR. Proficient %: 17.1 / 35.1
- Not Proficient %: 25.3 / 7.9

Average test scores
- SAT Total: 1001.9 (▼ −74.8)

Royal Oak High School (ROHS) is a public high school located in Royal Oak, Michigan, United States. The principal is Donal Loomis. It is a part of Royal Oak Schools.

== History ==
Royal Oak High School is a 2006 consolidation of former intra-city rivals Royal Oak George A. Dondero High School and Royal Oak Clarence M. Kimball High School.

This educational facility draws its name from the original Royal Oak High School (later Clara Barton Junior High), which opened in 1914, and its successor, the "new" Royal Oak High School, which opened in 1927. After the opening of a second high school facility within the Royal Oak school system in 1957, the then Royal Oak High School changed its name to George A. Dondero High School. Its counterpart was named Clarence M. Kimball High School. O'Dell, Hewlett and Luckenbach was the architecture firm that designed the school.

At their peak, both institutions had enrollments of over 2,000 students. However, declining enrollment throughout the district forced the merger of Dondero High School with Kimball High School in the fall of 2006. Kimball High School became the site of the newly merged school. Extensive renovations were made to accommodate the merger of students, after which the high school was renamed Royal Oak High School.

In 2009, Detroit rapper Eminem shot his short film Where Have You Been? in the halls and on the grounds of Royal Oak High School.

On October 12, 2010, Royal Oak High School was featured on the MTV show If You Really Knew Me. The episode was the season 1 finale and documents "Challenge Day" at Royal Oak High School.

The high school had an average score of 98.6 on the state's MEAP test in 2011 and a very high number of AP students.

== School media ==
There have been two student news publications at Royal Oak High School: The Herald and The Acorn.

The Herald, which originated from Kimball High School ("Knights"), featured school-centered news and updates. The Herald was discontinued due to lack of funding, leaving The Acorn as the sole news source for the school since 2011. The Acorn is a news magazine—originally from Dondero High School's "Oaks" publication—that reports on more widespread affairs to increase student global awareness. The Acorn is a recipient of the Michigan Interscholastic Press Association (MIPA) awards.

Noesis is the student creative arts magazine, providing a forum for student artists to publish their work. Royal Oak High School's PTSA publishes a bimonthly bulletin called "The Raven's Call."

Royal Oak High School also has a media class that broadcasts on public access, WOAK, and on the school closed-circuit feed. School announcements and short student videos are featured on a student news program titled "The Raven Report" and broadcast to all classrooms over the Internet.

== Notable alumni ==
=== Clarence M. Kimball High School (prior to consolidation) ===
- Debra Evans - writer
- Margo Jonker - softball coach
- Chris Gore - writer
- Mona Hanna-Attisha - pediatrician, public health advocate, and Flint Water Crisis whistleblower
- Andre Comeau - musician, original cast member of MTV's The Real World: New York
- Dean Fertita - musician, former member of Reigndance, Queens of the Stoneage, The Dead Weather, among others

=== George A. Dondero High School (prior to consolidation) ===
- Glenn Frey - founder of rock band Eagles
- Judith Guest - author of Ordinary People
- Tom Hayden - anti-Vietnam War activist, author, and California state legislator
- Chris Savino - animator, creator of The Loud House
