= Energy Works Michigan =

Nonprofit organization

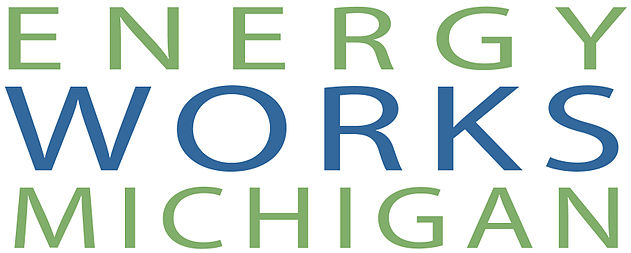
- Founded: 2009; Ann Arbor, MI, United States
- Type: 501(c)(3)
- Location: Ann Arbor, MI, United States
- Key people: Emile Lauzzana, Director
- Website: energyworksmichigan.org

Energy Works Michigan (Energy Works) was a non-profit affiliate of the Ecology Center based in Ann Arbor, Michigan. Energy Works employs seven staff members.

Energy Works was funded by the Michigan Public Service Commission (MPSC) to administer the Michigan Renewable Schools Program (MRSP), implementing energy efficiency and renewable energy measures at public, private and charter K-12 schools throughout the State of Michigan. Energy Works provides K-12 schools in Michigan with technical assistance and incentive funding.

Energy Works has partnered with 67 K-12 schools and districts throughout the State of Michigan. Energy Works will partner with approximately 90 additional Michigan K-12 schools beginning in September 2011.

== Michigan Renewable Schools Program ==
Energy Works administers the Michigan Renewable Schools Program , a 5-year $8M program funded by the MPSC . Energy Works provides public, private and charter K-12 schools in Michigan with technical assistance and incentive funding to implement energy efficiency and renewable energy measures.

Energy Works has partnered with 67 K-12 schools and districts throughout the State of Michigan. Energy Works will partner with approximately 90 additional Michigan K-12 schools beginning in September 2011. The program has received considerable interest from K-12 schools statewide.

The Michigan Renewable Schools Program is a coordinated set of programs, including:

- Energy Efficiency Program: to implement energy efficiency building upgrades
- Renewable Energy Program: to install renewable energy systems, including solar photovoltaic (PV) and/or wind
- Educational Resources: to provide teachers with training and resources to make energy efficiency and renewable energy an integral part of their classrooms and school community
- Post-Secondary Program: to inspire high school students to pursue continuing education and career pathways in energy efficiency and renewable energy at a Michigan college or university
- Student Contests & Teacher Grants: to engage teachers and students in green initiatives that explore the challenges and opportunities of building a sustainable future

== History ==
On November 19, 2010, the Michigan State Administrative Board approved the Michigan Energy Efficiency Grant in the amount of $4.4 million awarded to Energy Works by the MPSC . The MPSC is an agency within the Michigan Department of Energy, Labor & Economic Growth. The award is funding Energy Works to administer and expand the Michigan Renewable Schools Program . The term of the grant is January 1, 2011 through December 31, 2013. The availability of this funding will allow Energy Works to partner with approximately 90 additional Michigan K-12 schools in Michigan beginning in September 2011.

On April 22, 2009, the MPSC issued an order approving $5.5 million in Michigan energy efficiency grants for all customer classes to three organizations, including Energy Works Michigan, Elkton-Pigeon-Bay Port Laker Schools, and Great Lakes Energy Service.

On April 22, 2009, the Michigan State Administrative Board approved the Michigan Energy Efficiency Grant in the amount of $3.5 million awarded to Energy Works, in partnership with Recycle Ann Arbor and the Ecology Center, by the MPSC . The award funded Energy Works to administer the Michigan Renewable Schools Program , a 2-year pilot program through May 31, 2011. During the pilot phase of the program, Energy Works partnered with 67 K-12 schools and districts statewide.

The grants are part of the Low-Income and Energy Efficiency Fund (LIEEF) , which provides energy bill assistance for low-income customers and promotes the efficient use of energy by all customer classes.

== See also ==
- Ecology Center
