= Debra Evans =

American writer

- Occupation: Author
- Years active: 1971-present

Debra Evans is an American writer known for her books on issues related to contemporary Christian spirituality, reproductive health, women's wellness, and family relationships. She has written over 22 non-fiction books.

== Biography ==
She was born to John Cleve Munger and Nancy Allen Munger at St. Joseph Hospital, Pontiac, Michigan. After completing studies at Royal Oak's Kimball High School in 1969, Evans entered Justin Morrill College at Michigan State University as an Art and English major. She met David Evans in 1969 and married him in 1970. Following David's graduation in 1970 from MSU, the couple returned to Oakland County.

While studying at Wayne State University in early 1971, she became a Christian. Between 1971 and 1974, Evans and her husband founded and managed Predmore Farm, a residential Christian community located in Oakland Charter Township, now the centennial site of Cranberry Lake Farm, a 207-acre (0.84 km^{2}) park where members of the Detroit Symphony Orchestra perform an annual summer concert. After giving birth to her first child at home on the farm in 1972, Evans became a childbirth educator and breastfeeding advisor, later working as one of the nation's first paid lactation consultants at William Beaumont Hospital in Royal Oak.

Until her retirement from the field in 2003, she remained involved in health education and midwifery advocacy. Evans taught classes as a part-time instructor at Lansing Community College (1978–1981) and the University of Nebraska–Lincoln (1984–1988). She also served in Michigan as state coordinator of the International Childbirth Education Association (1979–1981) and member of the Department of Health's Task Force on Perinatal Education (1980–1981); in Nebraska as member of the Lincoln-Lancaster Health Department Task Force on Children and Youth, Teen Pregnancy Subcommittee (1983–1984) and the State of Nebraska Breastfeeding Promotion Task Force (1988–1990); in Georgia as member of the DeKalb County Disabilities Council (1991–1993) and president of Atlanta Bethany Christian Services (1991–1993); and in Texas as board member and chair of the State of Texas Midwifery Board (1998–2003). As a founding board member of the Firelight Foundation, Evans also advocated for the needs of children affected by HIV/AIDS in Sub-Saharan Africa.

In 1978, she developed and taught Parents Preparing in Christ (PPC), a class series for expectant Christian couples in Michigan (1978–1981) and Nebraska (1982–1990). Immediately after her graduation in 1983 from the University of Nebraska–Lincoln (BA, University Studies in Family Wellness and Reproductive Health), Evans wrote her first non-fiction book, The Complete Guide to Childbirth, based on her research for the PPC curriculum. Following the book's publication in 1986, she has continued to author many additional works, including Beauty and the Best, Kindred Hearts, Blessing Your Husband, and Blessing Your Grown Children.

From 1989 to 1996, Evans was contributing editor of Christian Parenting Today.

Since 1986, Evans has appeared as a featured guest on over five hundred radio and television interviews. Her participation in the panel discussion on reproductive technology and embryonic stem cell research (taped on March 7, 1990, by Family Christian Broadcasting Network–KFCB, Concord, California) was awarded the 1990 Angel Award for Best Network Documentary.

Her seventh book, Without Moral Limits, resulted in invitations for Evans to serve as a member of the Colloquium on Medical Ethics held at Trinity Evangelical Divinity School (1989) and the Christianity Today Institute Forum on Birth Control (1991), with subsequent statements and articles published in the New England Journal of Medicine (1990) and Christianity Today (1991). She was a signatory of the statement, “On human embryos and medical research: an appeal for ethically responsible science and public policy."

== Works ==
Non-fiction
Blessing Your Grown Children: Affirming, Helping, and Establishing Boundaries (2012) ISBN 978-1-58997-479-1
Blessing Your Husband: Understanding and Affirming Your Man (2009) ISBN 978-1-58997-478-4
Blessing Your Husband (2003) ISBN 978-1-58997-003-8
Soul Satisfaction (2001) ISBN 978-1-58134-284-0
Without Moral Limits: Women, Reproduction, and Medical Technology (2000) ISBN 978-1-58134-201-7
The Christian Woman’s Guide to Childbirth (1999) ISBN 978-1-58134-104-1
Women of Courage (1999) ISBN 978-0-310-22223-1
The Christian Woman’s Guide to Personal Healthcare (1998) ISBN 978-1-58134-020-4
Women of Character (1997) ISBN 978-0-310-21921-7
Ready or Not, You’re a Grandparent (1997) ISBN 978-0-7814-0244-6
The Christian Woman’s Guide to Sexuality (1997) ISBN 978-0-89107-949-1
Kindred Hearts (1997) ISBN 978-1-56179-437-9
Six Qualities of Women of Character (1996) ISBN 978-0-310-20153-3
Beauty and the Best (1993) ISBN 978-1-56179-178-1
The Woman’s Complete Guide to Personal Health Care (1991) ISBN 978-1-56121-075-6
Blessed Events (1990) ISBN 978-0-89107-555-4
Without Moral Limits (1989) ISBN 978-0-89107-472-4
Preparing for Childbirth (1989) ISBN 978-0-8423-4917-8
Fragrant Offerings (1988) ISBN 978-0-89107-500-4
Beauty for Ashes (1988) ISBN 978-0-89107-501-1
Heart & Home (1988) ISBN 978-0-89107-464-9
The Mystery of Womanhood (1987) ISBN 978-0-89107-426-7
The Complete Book on Childbirth (1986) ISBN 978-0-8423-0407-8

Audiobook
Read by Debra Evans: Six Qualities of Women of Character (1996) ISBN 978-0-310-20519-7

General editor
Christian Parenting Answers: Before Birth to Five Years (1994) ISBN 978-0-7814-0182-1

Books contributed to
Evans has also contributed chapters to several books, including:
Beyond Today (2000), edited by John MacArthur ISBN 978-1-58134-170-6
Breakfast for the Soul (1998) compiled by Judith Couchman ISBN 978-1-56292-531-4
One Holy Passion (1998) compiled by Judith Couchman ISBN 978-1-57856-038-7
Christian Parenting Answers: Before Birth to Five Years (1994) ISBN 978-0-7814-0182-1

== Articles by Evans ==
- Friendship in Marriage
- When to Wean
- Sex Ed at Home
- Building Friendship in Marriage
- Your Child Today: Birth to Twelve Months
