= Royal Oak Schools =

School district in Michigan, United States

Address
- 800 DeVillen St. Royal Oak, Oakland, Michigan, 48073; United States

District information
- Type: Public school district
- Grades: Prekindergarten-12
- Superintendent: Mary Beth Fitzpatrick
- Schools: 9
- Budget: $94,739,000 2022-2023 expenditures
- NCES District ID: 2630300

Students and staff
- Students: 4,904 (2024-2025)
- Teachers: 345.35 FTE (2024-2025)
- Staff: 707.23 FTE (2024-2025)
- Student–teacher ratio: 14.2 (2024-2025)

Other information
- Website: www.royaloakschools.org

Royal Oak Schools (formerly Royal Oak Neighborhood Schools) is a school district in Greater Detroit, Michigan. The district provides public school services for the municipality of Royal Oak and the easternmost portion of Berkley and south Troy .

The district adopted the "Royal Oak Schools" branding in the early 2010s. (Note: The earliest available instance of branding of "Royal Oak Schools" was first referenced in a spring 2013 newsletter.)

List of Schools
Name of the School	Address	Year Constructed	Notes
Royal Oak High School	1500 Lexington Blvd.	1957	High school.
Royal Oak Middle School	709 N. Washington Ave.	1927	Middle school.
Jane Addams Elementary School	2222 W. Webster Rd.	1952	Primary school. Also Addams Early Childhood Center.
Helen Keller Elementary School	1505 N. Campbell Rd.	1961	Primary school.
Northwood Elementary School	926 W. 12 Mile Rd.	1923, rebuilt 2007	Primary school.
Oakland Elementary School	2415 E. Brockton Ave.	1924	Primary school. Oldest in the school district.
Oak Ridge Elementary School	506 E. 13 Mile Rd.	1951	Primary school.
Upton Elementary School	4400 Mandalay Ave.	1952	Primary school.
Winston Churchill Community Education Center	707 Girard Ave.	1964	Alternative school. Formerly Winston Churchill Elementary (later middle school).

== Former schools ==
Name of the School	Year Constructed	Notes
Union School	1902	All grades; razed. Subsequently the site of Washington Elementary School.
Longfellow School	1919	Razed in 2008
Grant Elementary	1924	Razed 1980
Abraham Lincoln Elementary	1953	Razed in 2008. Also known as Lincoln Early Childhood Center.
U. S. Grant Elementary	1924	Razed 1980.
Thomas Jefferson Elementary	1957	Sold and converted for use as a Comcast cable TV download station.
George Washington Elementary	1924	Sold to Oakland Community College and later razed in 1975.
Benjamin Franklin Elementary	1927	Razed in 2004.
Edwin Starr Elementary	1919	Razed in 2008.
Ezra Parker Elementary	1919	Razed in 2004.
Edmund Lockman Elementary	1949	Razed in 2015. Used as storage due to being connected to Keller.
Henry Wadsworth Longfellow Elementary	1919	Razed in 2008.
Mark Twain Elementary	1954	Razed in 2008.
Ralph Waldo Emerson Elementary	1959	Razed in 2016. Used as administrative offices.
John Greenleaf Whittier Elementary	1922	Razed in 2008.
Jane Addams Junior High	1952	Consolidated, now Addams Elementary/Addams Early Childhood Center.
Clara Barton Junior High	1913	Razed 1979.
Helen Keller Junior High	1961	Consolidated, now Keller Elementary.
Mary Lyon Junior High	1916	Razed 1982. Formerly named Oak Ridge Junior High before 1951.
George A. Dondero High School	1927	Consolidated.
Clarence M. Kimball High School	1957	Consolidated.

Student populations from Dondero High and Kimball High were consolidated as Royal Oak High School in the former Kimball High School. The former Dondero High became Royal Oak Middle School.
