= Dondero High School =

Coordinates: 42°29′40.1″N 83°08′54.7″W

- Royal Oak, Michigan, United States

Information
- School type: Public
- Motto: "Enter to learn, go forth to serve”
- Founded: 1927
- Closed: 2006
- School district: Royal Oak Neighborhood Schools
- Final Principal: Bridget Schipper
- Enrollment: 852 (in 2006)
- Colors: Navy Blue and White
- Nickname: The Oaks
- Publication: Yearbook (Oak), Newsmagazine (Acorn), and Art Magazine (Genesis)
- Affiliations: Royal Oak Neighborhood Schools
- Website: web.archive.org/web/*/http://www.rosd.k12.mi.us/schools/dondero.html

George A. Dondero High School (formerly Royal Oak High School) opened in 1927 in Royal Oak, Michigan in Greater Detroit. It was named after former Royal Oak School Board president and U.S. representative George A. Dondero. A part of the Royal Oak Neighborhood Schools, it and Clarence M. Kimball High School were consolidated to form the current Royal Oak High School.

== Overview ==
Opened in 1927 as Royal Oak High School, it was renamed as Dondero High School in 1957 after Clarence M. Kimball High School opened.

Due to declining enrollment, the school became a middle school at the beginning of the 2007/2008 school year. Dondero was closed following the 2005-06 school year to allow for renovations, and district high school students from both Dondero and Kimball High School were consolidated. At the peak of enrollment, Dondero had more than 2,000 students, which had declined to 650 in its final year

On October 31, 2006, the Dondero gymnasium was set on fire, causing extensive damage. Arson was suspected, and two teenage suspects were later arrested.

On October 20, 2007, the building was officially re-dedicated as Royal Oak Middle School. The dedication ceremony took place at 4:20 PM in the restored auditorium housing three huge W.P.A. murals.

== Notable alumni ==
- Jason Beverlin, American Major League Baseball player
- William Broomfield, American politician, businessman and philanthropist
- Daniel Casey, American screenwriter
- Bud Chamberlain, American baseball player and realtor
- Marie Donigan, member of the Michigan House of Representatives
- Glenn Frey, American musician and actor, a founding member of the Eagles
- Dave Gillanders - 1960 Olympic bronze medalist in swimming
- Judith Guest, American novelist and screenwriter
- Tom Hayden, American social and political activist and politician
- Maynard Morrison, football All-American
- Bill Muncey, hydroplane racing champion
- Chris Savino, American cartoonist, animator, and writer, and creator of the animated series The Loud House.
- Steve Stockman, American politician
- Jack Tompkins, American baseball and ice hockey player, airline executive and Greater Detroit area civic leader
- Jordan Vogt-Roberts, American film and television director
- Norm Zauchin, American Major League Baseball player
