= Ecology Center (Ann Arbor) =

US Environmental Organization

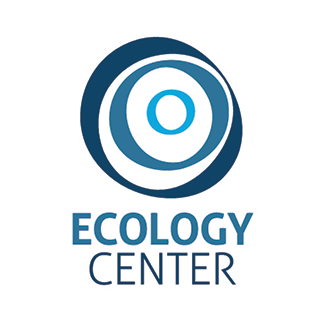
- Founded: 1970; Ann Arbor, Michigan, United States
- Type: 501(c)(3)
- Purpose: Environmentalism, Global Warming, Renewable Energy
- Location: Ann Arbor, MI, United States
- Method: Direct action, lobbying, petition, demonstration
- Key people: Mike Garfield, Director
- Website: ecocenter.org

The Ecology Center is a membership-based nonprofit environmental organization based in Ann Arbor, Michigan. It works at the local, state and national levels on environmental justice, health, waste, and community issues. It was formed after the first Earth Day in 1970 by community activists in Ann Arbor. Since its founding, it has run demonstrations and campaigns to promote recycling, health care, education, and awareness about healthy foods and products.

== History ==
After the first Earth Day in 1970, community activists in Ann Arbor formed the Ecology Center to promote safe and healthy environments for people. Among their demonstrations and projects the group created a recycling program which have since grown into a wholly owned green business. In the 1990s, the Ecology Center created one of the largest land preservation programs in the country. As of 2010 more than 8,000 acres of farms and natural areas in southeast Michigan have been protected.

The Ecology Center led a statewide campaign that closed every single one of Michigan's 157 medical waste incinerators—the second leading source of mercury and dioxin emissions into the environment.

A coalition led by the Ecology Center won federal mandates to remove lead and recover mercury from vehicles in the United States.

Beginning in 2005, the Ecology Center developed a unique resource, HealthyStuff.org, that tests common products for lead, mercury, or other toxic chemicals.

In 2011, the Ecology Center was named a "Green Leader" by the Detroit Free Press. The award recognizes "individuals, businesses and organizations who exhibit excellence in environmental responsibility."

In July 2011, the Ecology Center moved into an expanded office at 339 E. Liberty, Ann Arbor, known as the Handicraft Building. In keeping with the Ecology Center's mission, the new office space incorporated many green features, including sustainable and recycled materials. Students from Eastern Michigan University designed furniture for the office using reclaimed materials.

== Programs ==
=== Climate and energy ===
The Ecology Center's Clean Energy, Clean Fuels Campaign promotes policy solutions that increase United States energy independence, decrease Michigan's global warming pollution, and encourage sustainable agricultural and forestry practices that improve soil quality, enhance wildlife habitat, and preserve other conservation values

=== Environmental Education ===
The Ecology Center brings hands-on environmental lessons to schools throughout southeastern Michigan. Programs include classroom visits, teacher training and curriculum development and web links and printed resources for teachers.

=== Michigan Network for Children's Environmental Health ===
The Ecology Center is a member of the Michigan Network for Children's Environmental Health which aims to promote healthy and safe environment for children through advocacy, education, outreach, and cooperation with health professionals, health affected groups, and environmental organizations.

=== HealthyStuff ===
A website launched by the Ecology Center, HealthyStuff offers a listing the amount of lead, arsenic, mercury, chlorine, and bromine in over 900 products including toys, school supplies, car seats, automobiles, pet products, apparels, and home improvement tools and supplies.

=== Land Use ===
The goal is to preserve farmland and natural areas, concentrate development where infrastructure exists, and reduce traffic congestion.

=== Recycle Ann Arbor ===
Founded in 1977, Recycle Ann Arbor is a nonprofit organization that grew out of the Ecology Center recycling program. It is Michigan's first curbside recycling program in 1978 and currently operates dropoff stations and reused building material and household supply shops for Ann Arbor residents.

== Campaigns ==
=== Healthy Food in Health Care ===
The Healthy Food in Health Care program works with hospitals across Michigan to provide locally and sustainably produced foods for their patients and staff. To date over 300 hospitals across the nation have signed on.

=== Green chemistry ===
Green chemistry is a scientific movement aimed at replacing toxic chemicals with safer alternatives. The Ecology Center has been involved in the movement shortly after its founding and received a Green Chemistry Gubernatorial Awards in 2009 by the state governor.

=== Built by Michigan ===
The Built By Michigan coalition brings together small business, large business, workers, families, electric vehicle owners and car aficionados, environmental and faith based organizations, and more to advance the manufacturing and sales of the electric vehicle in Michigan to strengthen the local economy and increase employment in the state.

=== Energy Works Michigan ===
Energy Works Michigan was a non-profit technical resource building foundational capacities for a sustainable, equitable, and prosperous future in Michigan.

This program no longer exists.
