= Madison365 =

Non-profit organization in Madison, Wisconsin

Madison365 is a nonprofit online news outlet in Madison, Wisconsin. It is a community news publication that primarily covers communities of color and issues important to those communities.

== History ==
Madison365 was founded in 2015 by entrepreneur Henry Sanders, Jr. and journalists Robert Chappell and A. David Dahmer. Dahmer had previously been editor of the African American-centered newspaper The Madison Times.

In late 2015, Madison365 struck a content-sharing partnership with Channel3000, the online outlet of WISC, the Madison CBS affiliate, allowing greater reach for Madison365's content.

In 2016, the organization started the Madison365 Academy, the stated aim of which was to train young people of color in journalism.
