= The Poisoned City =

2018 book by Anna Clark

The Poisoned City: Flint's Water and the American Urban Tragedy
- Author: Anna Clark
- Language: English
- Subject: Flint water crisis
- Publisher: Metropolitan Books
- Publication date: July 10, 2018
- Pages: 320
- ISBN: 978-1-250-12514-9

The Poisoned City: Flint's Water and the American Urban Tragedy is a 2018 book by journalist Anna Clark that examines the Flint water crisis.
