= List of schools in the Saginaw Intermediate School District =

This is a list of schools in the Saginaw Intermediate School District (SISD). Most of Saginaw County, Michigan is served by the Saginaw Intermediate School District, which coordinates the efforts of local boards of education, but has no operating authority over schools. Local school boards in Michigan retain great autonomy over day-to-day operations.

== Public schools ==
The communities of Saginaw County are served by twelve public school districts.

School name	Low grade	High grade	School district	Students in 2004 (K-12)*	Students in 2014 (K-12)**	FTE Teachers***	Student/teacher ratio***	Notes
Anna M. Thurston Middle School	06	08	St. Charles Community Schools	307	228	13	21.38	
Arrowwood Elementary School	03	05	Saginaw Township Community Schools	445	446	28.52	17.11	
Arthur Eddy Elementary School	K	05	Saginaw Public School District	392	425	17.4	16.26	Previously Arthur Eddy K-8 Academy; Magnet school
Big Rock Elementary School	K	04	Chesaning Union Schools	338	553	30.8	18.12	
Birch Run High School	09	12	Birch Run Area Schools	570	584	28	21.21	
Bridgeport High School	09	12	Bridgeport-Spaulding Community School District	663	563	27	18.7	
Carrollton Elementary School	K	05	Carrollton Public Schools	559	689	45	14.56	
Carrollton High School	09	12	Carrollton Public Schools	406	552	27.77	18.01	
Carrollton Middle School	06	08	Carrollton Public Schools	352	428	24.04	17.43	
Chesaning High School	09	12	Chesaning Union Schools	658	524	25.6	21.6	
Chesaning Middle School	05	08	Chesaning Union Schools	675	477	25.6	19.38	
Chester F. Miller School	PK	05	Saginaw Public School center	100	10	15	20.67	
E.F. Rittmueller Middle School	05	08	Frankenmuth School District	345	327	14.85	20.88	
Frankenmuth High School	09	12	Frankenmuth School District	593	532	23.2	22.8	
Freeland Elementary School	03	06	Freeland Community School District	538	580	27.47	20.17	
Freeland Learning Center	PK	02	Freeland Community School District	363	424	22.2	18.78	
Freeland Middle School / High School	07	12	Freeland Community School District	780	834	40.33	20.7	
Handley Elementary School	K	05	Saginaw Public School District	415	428	18	24.72	Formerly known as Handley School P.C.A.T; Magnet school
Hemlock Elementary School	PK	01	Hemlock Public School District	288	141	12.23	11.53	
Hemlock High School	09	12	Hemlock Public School District	524	426	21.9	18.54	
Hemlock Middle School	06	08	Hemlock Public School District	344	282	14	20.86	
Hemmeter Elementary School	K	05	Saginaw Township Community Schools	318	370	13.75	23.93	Magnet school
Herig School	PK	05	Saginaw Public School District	284	394	19	17.68	
Heritage High School	09	12	Saginaw Township Community Schools	1639	1539	76.29	20.51	
Jessie Loomis Elementary School	PK	05	Saginaw Public School District	237	424	20	17.95	
Jessie Rouse Elementary School	PK	05	Saginaw Public School District	245	274	15	15.73	
K.C. Ling Elementary School	02	05	Hemlock Public School District	292	335	17.67	19.47	
Kempton Elementary School	PK	05	Saginaw Public School District	253	399	20	20.6	
Lorenz C. List Elementary School	PK	04	Frankenmuth School District	370	378	21.85	16.7	
M.G. Millet Learning Center	PK	12	Saginaw Intermediate School District	2045	244	37	6.22	
Mackinaw High School	09	12	Saginaw Township Community Schools	317	228	6.5	31.85	Previously known as Mackinaw Academy; Campus previously used for Plainfield Elementary School
Marshall Greene Middle School	05	08	Birch Run Area Schools	613	537	29.4	18.23	
Martin G. Atkins Middle School	02	08	Bridgeport-Spaulding Community School District	766	411	21.3	17.14	Formerly Bridgeport-Spaulding Middle School and Martin G. Atkins Elementary School; Data based on Bridgeport-Spaulding Middle School; Magnet school
Merrill Elementary School	PK	05	Merrill Community Schools	374	309	18.8	17.29	
Merrill High School	09	12	Merrill Community Schools	276	236	10.4	23.65	Shares campus with Merrill Middle School
Merrill Middle School	06	08	Merrill Community Schools	237	147	9.35	17.01	Shares campus with Merrill High School
Merrill Park Elementary School	PK	05	Saginaw Public School District	318	257	14.5	15.03	
North Elementary School	PK	04	Birch Run Area Schools	715	661	33	18.79	
OMNI Adult & Alternative Education	9	12	Carrollton Public Schools	46	175	9.19	20.78	
Post Secondary Transition	UG	UG	Carrollton Public Schools	3 (2005)	166			2004-2005 was first year
Robert B. Havens Elementary School	PK	05	Swan Valley School District	343	320	16	20.12	
Saginaw Arts and Sciences Academy (SASA)	06	12	Saginaw Public School District	361	628	29.3	21.19	Magnet school
Saginaw Career Complex (SCC)	11	12	Saginaw Public School District	91	12	20.2	2.28	Previously known as Career Opportunities Center (COC)
Saginaw ISD Transitions Center	UG	UG	Saginaw Intermediate School District	12	8	3	1	
Saginaw United High School	09	12	Saginaw Public School District	N/A	N/A			Opened in 2024
Sherwood Elementary School	K	02	Saginaw Township Community Schools	440	476	29.19	15.62	
Shields Elementary School	K	05	Swan Valley School District	367	403	20.5	18.59	
St. Charles Community High School	09	12	St. Charles Community Schools	391	321	17.2	24.36	
St. Charles Elementary School	K	05	St. Charles Community Schools	485 (2007)	405	21.8	20	First year was 2006-2007
St. Charles Virtual School	K	05	St. Charles Community Schools	N/A	75			First year was 2013-2014
Stone Elementary School	PK	05	Saginaw Public School District	298	232	12.5	14.88	
Swan Valley Adult and Alternative Education	09	12	Swan Valley School District	30 (2008)	19	1	29	First year was 2007-2008
Swan Valley High School	09	12	Swan Valley School District	611	599	31.81	20.47	
Swan Valley Middle School	06	08	Swan Valley School District	396	418	21.34	19.73	
Thomas White Elementary School	K	01	Bridgeport-Spaulding Community School District	213	180	14.9	11.34	
Weiss Elementary School	03	05	Saginaw Township Community Schools	290	335	17.1	17	
Westdale Elementary School	PK	02	Saginaw Township Community Schools	254	353	18.49	18.12	
White Pine Middle School	06	08	Saginaw Township Community Schools	1100	1138	67.21	17.13	
Willie E. Thompson Middle School	06	08	Saginaw Public School District	800	526	30	19.07	
Zilwaukee School	PK	08	Saginaw Public School District	310	359	21.6	17.5	

*Note: Based on 2003-2004 student count data
**Note: Based on 2013-2014 student count data
***Note: Based on 2012-2013 school year data
Key: K=Kindergarten; PK=Pre-kindergarten; UG=No grade levels ("ungraded"); n/a=Not applicable (typically an independent charter school); {blank}=Data not available

== Private schools ==
The Saginaw Intermediate School District includes these private schools:

School name	Low grade	High grade	School district	Students in 2004 (K-12)*	Students in 2013 (K-12)**	FTE Teachers***	Student/teacher ratio***	Notes
Bethany/St. John's Evangelical Lutheran School	PK	08	Saginaw Township Community Schools	28	24	3	9,7	
Bethlehem Lutheran School	PK	08	Carrollton Public Schools	182	138	9.8	14.1	
Bridgeport Baptist Academy	K	12	Bridgeport-Spaulding Community School District		121	11	8.8	
Christ Evangelical Lutheran School	K	08	Chesaning Union Schools	12	19	3.1	7.4	
Community Baptist Christian School	K	12	Swan Valley School District	120	117	12.8	8.2	
Gethsemane Lutheran School	K	08	Saginaw Township Community Schools		24	2	8	
Good Shepherd Lutheran School	PK	K	Saginaw Township Community Schools	120	102	1	20	
Grace Christian School	PK	12	Saginaw Township Community Schools	117	52	7	6.7	
Holy Cross Lutheran School	PK	08	Saginaw Public School District	135	142	9.1	11.06	
Immanuel Lutheran School	PK	08	Frankenmuth School District	82	62	5.8	10.7	
Michigan Lutheran Seminary	09	12	Saginaw Public School District	313	194	24.4	9.3	
Nouvel Catholic Central High School / Saginaw Area Catholic Schools	09	12	Saginaw Township Community Schools	505	346	23.8	14.4	
Peace Lutheran School	PK	08	Saginaw Township Community Schools	229	257	14.9	20.2	
St. John's Lutheran School	K	08	Hemlock Public School District	32	22	3	10.67	
St. Lorenz Lutheran School	PK	08	Frankenmuth School District		509	3	9.7	
St. Paul Lutheran School	PK	08	Saginaw Public School District	155	131	8	14.8	
St. Peter Lutheran School	PK	08	Hemlock Public School District		110	7.8	14.5	
St. Stephen Parish School	PK	08	Saginaw Public School District	364	369	18	16.5	
St. Thomas Aquinas School	PK	08	Saginaw Township Community Schools	403	467	27	14.2	
Tri-City Seventh-Day Adventist School	01	08	Saginaw Public School District	18	8	1	5	
Valley Lutheran High School	09	12	Saginaw Township Community Schools	344	353	18.8	18.1	
Zion Evangelical Lutheran School	PK	08	Chesaning Union Schools		24	3.1	8.4	

*Note: Based on 2003-2004 school year data
**Note: Based on 2013 school year data
***Note: Based on 2012-2013 school year data
Key: K=Kindergarten; PK=Pre-kindergarten; {blank}=Data not available

== Charter schools ==
The Saginaw Intermediate School District includes these charter schools:

School name	Low grade	High grade	Chartering agency	Students in 2004*	Students in 2013**	FTE Teachers***	Student/teacher ratio***	Notes
Francis Reh. Public School Academy	PK	08	Ferris State University	275	460	23.57	17.35	Operated by The Leona Group
International Academy of Saginaw	K	08	Bay Mills Community College	81 (2007)	267	22.5	10.67	Magnet school
North Saginaw Charter Academy	K	08	Central Michigan University	562	454	22	14.41	Formerly John D. Oskola Charter Academy
Saginaw Learn to Earn Academy	09	12	Saginaw Intermediate School District	104 (2006)	150	4.77	22.85	
Saginaw Preparatory Academy	PK	08	Saginaw Valley State University	297	380	23.8	17.35	Formerly Mosaica Academy Of Saginaw; Magnet school

*Note: Based on 2003-2004 student count data
**Note: Based on 2013-2014 student count data
***Note: Based on 2012-2013 school year data
Key: K=Kindergarten; PK=Pre-kindergarten; {blank}=Data not available

== Colleges ==
The Saginaw Intermediate School District includes these colleges:

- Davenport University (Saginaw campus)
- Delta College
- Saginaw Valley State University

== Other agencies ==
The Saginaw Intermediate School District also includes these education agencies:

School name	Low grade	High grade	Students in 2004 (K-12)*	Students in 2014 (K-12)**	FTE Teachers***	Student/teacher ratio***	Notes
Hartley Outdoor Education Center	N/A	N/A	N/A	N/A		N/A	
Michael J McGivney School	07	12	48	56	8	7.75	
Saginaw County Juvenile Center	06	12	34	35	6	6	
Wolverine Secure Treatment Center / Wolverine Academy	06	12		97 (2013)	11	8.82	

*Note: Based on 2003-2004 student count data
**Note: Based on 2013-2014 student count data
***Note: Based on 2012-2013 school year data
Key: K=Kindergarten; PK=Pre-kindergarten; N/A=Not applicable; {blank}=Data not available

== Former schools ==
Schools which are no longer in use by the Saginaw Intermediate School District, or its member local school districts, include:

School name	Low grade	High grade	School district	Students	FTE Teachers*	Student/teacher ratio*	Notes
A.A. Claytor Elementary School	01	05	Buena Vista School District	284 (2004)			Closed in 2005; Now used for Saginaw Intermediate School District's Head Start program
Academy For Technology and Enterprise	10	12	Saginaw Intermediate School District	421 (2004)*	10.5	40.1	Charter school; Closed in 2009
Albee Elementary School	PK	04	Chesaning Union Schools	142 (2010)			Closed in 2010
Arthur Hill High School	09	12	Saginaw Public School District	1402 (2004), 937 (2014)	46.2	21.9	Closed in 2024
Brady Elementary School	K	04	Chesaning Union Schools	162 (2010)			Closed in 2010
Bridgeport-Spaulding Alternative Ed.	09	12	Bridgeport-Spaulding Community School District	113 (2005)	4	25.8	Closed in 2005
Brucker Elementary School	K	04	Bridgeport-Spaulding Community School District	206 (2005)			Closed in 2005
Brunkow Elementary School	K	02	Buena Vista School District	196 (2011)	9	28.7	Closed in 2011
Buena Vista High School	09	12	Buena Vista School District	163 (2013)	13	27.9	Closed in 2013; Purchased by Pansophic Learning in February 2015
C.C. Coulter Elementary School	PK	05	Saginaw Public School District	151 (2012)	10.5	18.8	Closed in 2012
Emerson Elementary School	PK	05	Saginaw Public School District	168 (2004)			Closed in 2004
Fred M. Schrah Elementary School	01	04	Bridgeport-Spaulding Community School District	252 (2005)			Closed in 2005
Fuerbringer Elementary School	K	05	Saginaw Public School District	252 (2006)			Closed in 2006
Heavenrich School	PK	05	Saginaw Public School District	371 (2014)	23.5	16.9	Closed in 2014
Henry Doerr CDC	PK	03	Buena Vista School District	144 (2013)	13	3.4	Closed in 2013
Hillier Educational Center	08	12	Saginaw Public School District	15 (2012)	4	9.3	Closed in 2012
Houghton Elementary School	PK	05	Saginaw Public School District	275 (2014)	23.5	13.3	Closed in 2014
Jerome School	PK	05	Saginaw Public School District	204 (2013)	16	18.3	Closed in 2013
John Moore Elementary School	PK	05	Saginaw Public School District	168 (2004)			Closed in 2004
Jones Elementary School	K	05	Saginaw Public School District	209 (2006)			Closed in 2006
Longfellow Elementary School	PK	05	Saginaw Public School District	153 (2013)	7	35.3	Closed in 2013
Martha Longstreet Elementary School	PK	05	Saginaw Public School District	210 (2003)			Closed in 2003
Miller Elementary School	K	05	St. Charles Community Schools	233 (2006)			Closed in 2006
Morley Elementary School	K	05	Saginaw Public School District	168 (2005)			Closed in 2005
Nelle Haley Elementary School	K	05	Saginaw Public School District	123 (2007)			Closed in 2007
North Middle School	06	08	Saginaw Public School District	319 (2006)			Closed in 2006
Patterson Elementary School	01	05	St. Charles Community Schools	259 (2006)			Closed in 2006
Phoenix Science and Technology Center	04	08	Buena Vista School District	124 (2013)	16	19.2	Formerly Ricker Middle School; Closed in 2013
Plainfield Elementary School	K	05	Saginaw Township Community Schools	259 (2010)	20.6	17.1	Closed in 2011; Now used for Mackinaw High School
Ruben Daniels Middle School	06	08	Saginaw Public School District	456 (2014)	39	16.3	Closed in 2014
Saginaw County Transition Academy	07	12	Saginaw Intermediate School District	25 (2004)*	1	25	Charter school; Closed in 2013
Saginaw High School	09	12	Saginaw Public School District	1038 (2004), 643 (2014)	39.4	15.05	Closed in 2024
Salina Elementary School	PK	05	Saginaw Public School District	130 (2003)			Closed in 2003
Schluckebier Elementary School	PK	01	Bridgeport-Spaulding Community School District	63 (2005)			Closed in 2005
St. Charles Alternative Education	09	12	St. Charles Community Schools	23 (2010)			Closed in 2010
Webber School	K	08	Saginaw Public School District	373 (2009)			Closed in 2009

*Note: Based on 2003-2004 school year data
Key: K=Kindergarten; PK=Pre-kindergarten; {blank}=Data not available
