= Saginaw Career Complex =

Location
- 2102 Weiss Street; Saginaw, Michigan 48602; United States; 43.44576°N 83.96919°W

Information
- School type: Public, Vocational education center
- Motto: Success in College and Career
- Status: Open
- School district: Saginaw Public School District
- Superintendent: Ramont Roberts
- NCES School ID: 263039000709
- Principal: Benjamin Leal
- Teaching staff: 20.20 (2012-13)
- Grades: 11 and 12
- Gender: Co-ed
- Feeder schools: High schools in Saginaw County, Michigan
- Formerly: Career Opportunities Center (COC)
- Website: Official website

Saginaw Career Complex (SCC) is a public vocational education center for Saginaw County located at 2102 Weiss Street in Saginaw, Michigan and part of the Saginaw Public School District. The school offers 19 programs that help students prepare for college, technical work, or skilled entry-level work. Students from high schools throughout Saginaw County are eligible to attend, and generally do so while continuing to attend classes at their home high school.

== Feeder schools ==
Students from high schools around Saginaw County are eligible to attend the Saginaw Career Complex, and generally do so while continuing to take classes at their home high school. Home school students from Saginaw County may also be eligible.

The complex's feeder schools include:

- Birch Run High School
- Bridgeport High School
- Bridgeport Alternative High School
- Bridgeport Baptist Academy
- Carrollton High School
- Chesaning Union High School
- Frankenmuth High School
- Freeland High School
- Grace Christian High School
- Hemlock High School
- Heritage High School
- Mackinaw High School
- Merrill High School
- New Lothrop High School
- Nouvel Catholic Central High School
- Omni High School
- St. Charles High School
- Saginaw Arts and Sciences Academy (SASA)
- Saginaw United High School
- Swan Valley High School
- Valley Lutheran High School
