= Buena Vista High School (Michigan) =

Former public high school in Buena Vista Charter Township, Michigan

Location
- 3945 East Holland; Buena Vista Township, Michigan 48601; United States; 43.41640°N 83.87916°W

Information
- School type: Public, High school
- Opened: 1959
- Status: Closed
- Closed: July 2013
- School district: Buena Vista School District
- CEEB code: 233288
- NCES School ID: 260723004314
- Teaching staff: 9.7 (2012-13)
- Grades: 9 to 12
- Gender: Co-ed
- Enrollment: 163 (2012-13)
- Student to teacher ratio: 16.8 (2012-13)
- Colors: Royal blue and White
- Athletics conference: Highland Conference
- Mascot: Knights
- Feeder schools: Ricker Middle School
- Class: D

Buena Vista High School was a public high school located at 3945 East Holland in Buena Vista Charter Township, Michigan and was part of the former Buena Vista School District. The school was closed when the Buena Vista School District was dissolved in July 2013. Buena Vista's mascot was the Knights, and its colors were blue and white. The school's athletic program competed in the Greater Thumb Conference as a Class C, and later in the Highland Conference as a Class D school.

== Closure ==
The school was closed, along with all other schools in the Buena Vista School District, after the district was dissolved when it missed a deadline to find loans or extra funding by July 22, 2013. With no loans or other funding available, the state ordered that the district be dissolved. On July 30, 2013, the Saginaw Intermediate School District Board of Trustees officially dissolved Buena Vista Schools. The Buena Vista District area was split up between three other districts: Saginaw Public School District, Bridgeport-Spaulding Community School District, and Frankenmuth School District.

The Saginaw Public School District acquired the Buena Vista headquarters building and all five school buildings, including Buena Vista High School. The district sold the high school campus to Pansophic Learning in February 2015 for a little over US$5,000,000. The offer was later rescinded.

== Athletics ==
The boys' basketball team was led by coach Norwaine Reed for 22 seasons from 1983 onwards. He helped lead the Knights to four Class "B" State Championships and three runner-up finishes and a 346–79 (.814) record. His teams won 55 consecutive games over a two-year span, as well as 10 District Championships, eight Regional Championships and four State Championships. As of 2010, no other boys' high school coach in Saginaw County had won more state titles than Reed.

== Notable alumni ==
- Damon Lowery, basketball player
- Mark Macon, basketball player and coach
- Jereme Perry, former NFL player
