= Buena Vista, Michigan =

- Unincorporated community Census-designated place
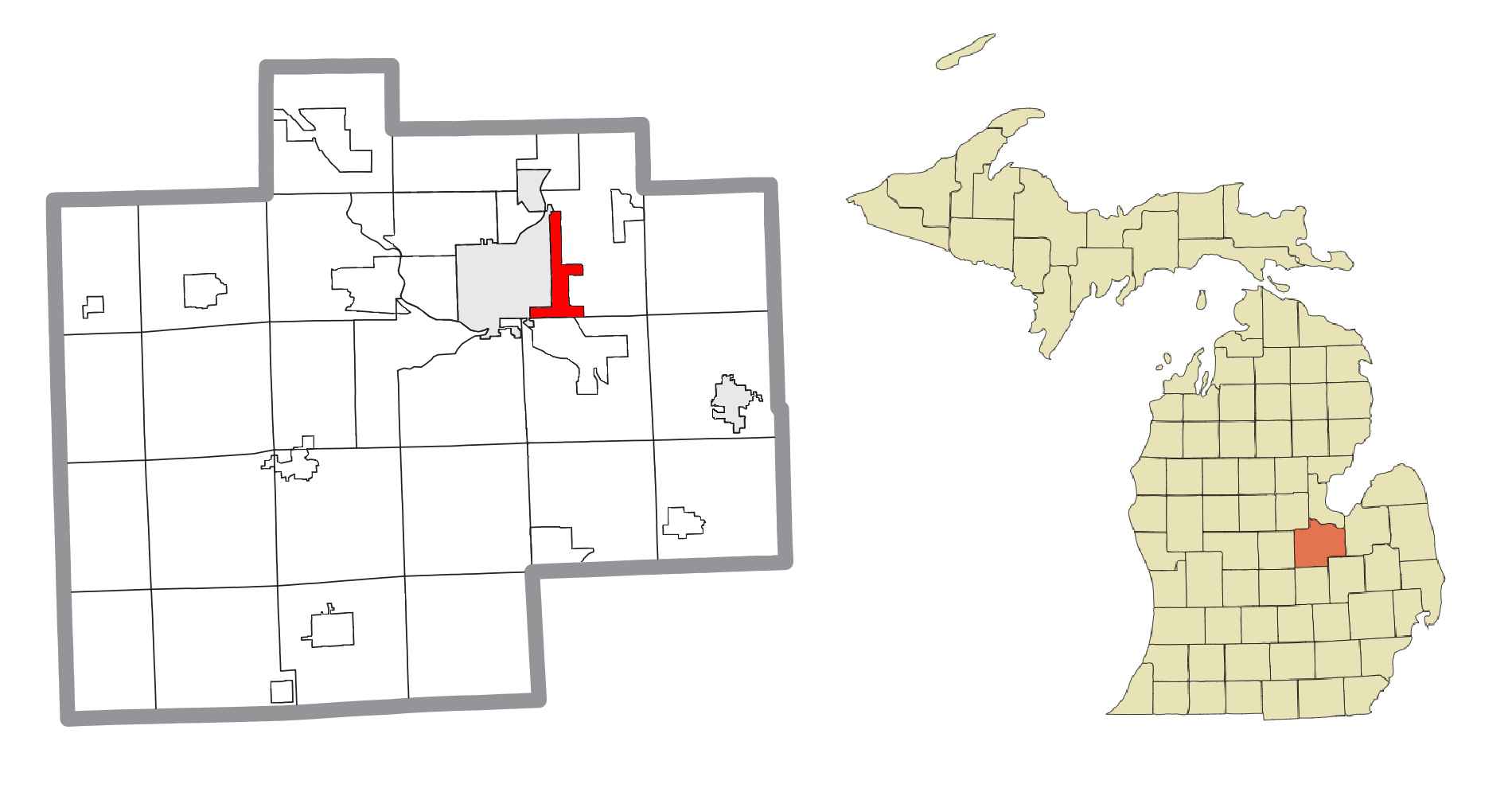
- Location within Saginaw County

- Location within the state of Michigan Buena Vista (the United States)
- Coordinates: 43°25′03″N 83°54′02″W
- Country: United States
- State: Michigan
- County: Saginaw
- Township: Buena Vista

Area
  - Total: 4.00 sq mi (10.35 km^{2})
  - Land: 4.00 sq mi (10.35 km^{2})
  - Water: 0 sq mi (0.00 km^{2})
- Elevation: 607 ft (185 m)

Population (2020)
  - Total: 5,855
  - Density: 1,465.1/sq mi (565.66/km^{2})
- Time zone: UTC-5 (Eastern (EST))
  - Summer (DST): UTC-4 (EDT)
- ZIP code(s): 48601 (Saginaw)
- Area code: 989
- FIPS code: 26-11555
- GNIS feature ID: 2393354

Buena Vista (/ˌbjuːnəˈvɪstə/ BEW-nə-VIS-tə) is an unincorporated community and census-designated place (CDP) within Buena Vista Charter Township, Saginaw County in the U.S. state of Michigan. The U.S. Census Bureau has defined a census-designated place (CDP) with the same name for statistical purposes. The CDP has no official status as a municipality and the boundaries defined by the Census Bureau may not precisely correspond to local understanding of the Buena Vista area. The CDP consists of an area adjacent to the city of Saginaw on the city's east side and mostly west of Interstate 75. As of the 2020 census, Buena Vista had a population of 5,855.

== History ==
Buena Vista began in 1846 when Curtis Emerson bought an abandoned mill here and created a settlement around it. It was named to commemorate Zachary Taylor's then recent victory at the Battle of Buena Vista.

On July 30, 2013, the Saginaw Intermediate School District Board of Trustees officially dissolved the Buena Vista School District with the district area being split up between three other districts.

== Geography ==
According to the United States Census Bureau, the CDP has a total area of 4.5 square miles (12 km^{2}), all land.

== Demographics ==
Historical population
Census	Pop.	Note	%±
2000	7,845		—
2010	6,816		−13.1%
2020	5,855		−14.1%
U.S. Decennial Census

=== Racial and ethnic composition ===
Buena Vista CDP, Michigan – Racial and ethnic composition Note: the US Census treats Hispanic/Latino as an ethnic category. This table excludes Latinos from the racial categories and assigns them to a separate category. Hispanics/Latinos may be of any race.
Race / Ethnicity (NH = Non-Hispanic)	Pop 2000	Pop 2010	Pop 2020	% 2000	% 2010	% 2020
White alone (NH)	1,519	961	770	19.36%	14.10%	13.15%
Black or African American alone (NH)	5,384	4,957	4,249	68.63%	72.73%	72.57%
Native American or Alaska Native alone (NH)	25	25	28	0.32%	0.37%	0.48%
Asian alone (NH)	13	20	13	0.17%	0.29%	0.22%
Native Hawaiian or Pacific Islander alone (NH)	1	1	0	0.01%	0.01%	0.00%
Other race alone (NH)	5	5	27	0.06%	0.07%	0.46%
Mixed race or Multiracial (NH)	128	159	226	1.63%	2.33%	3.86%
Hispanic or Latino (any race)	770	688	542	9.82%	10.09%	9.26%
Total	7,845	6,816	5,855	100.00%	100.00%	100.00%

=== 2020 census ===
As of the 2020 census, Buena Vista had a population of 5,855. The median age was 37.9 years. 27.8% of residents were under the age of 18 and 18.7% of residents were 65 years of age or older. For every 100 females there were 83.1 males, and for every 100 females age 18 and over there were 75.1 males age 18 and over.

100.0% of residents lived in urban areas, while 0.0% lived in rural areas.

There were 2,514 households in Buena Vista, of which 32.2% had children under the age of 18 living in them. Of all households, 18.1% were married-couple households, 22.4% were households with a male householder and no spouse or partner present, and 52.9% were households with a female householder and no spouse or partner present. About 37.9% of all households were made up of individuals and 16.7% had someone living alone who was 65 years of age or older.

There were 2,904 housing units, of which 13.4% were vacant. The homeowner vacancy rate was 3.1% and the rental vacancy rate was 12.1%.

=== 2000 census ===
As of the 2000 census, there were 7,845 people, 2,905 households, and 2,077 families residing in the CDP. The population density was 1,750.6 inhabitants per square mile (675.9/km^{2}). There were 3,192 housing units at an average density of 712.3 per square mile (275.0/km^{2}). The racial makeup of the CDP was 22.51% White, 69.27% African American, 0.45% Native American, 0.17% Asian, 0.01% Pacific Islander, 4.91% from other races, and 2.69% from two or more races. Hispanic or Latino of any race were 9.82% of the population.

There were 2,905 households, out of which 35.8% had children under the age of 18 living with them, 35.5% were married couples living together, 31.4% had a female householder with no husband present, and 28.5% were non-families. 24.1% of all households were made up of individuals, and 8.8% had someone living alone who was 65 years of age or older. The average household size was 2.65 and the average family size was 3.13.

In the CDP, the population was spread out, with 30.8% under the age of 18, 8.8% from 18 to 24, 26.2% from 25 to 44, 21.9% from 45 to 64, and 12.3% who were 65 years of age or older. The median age was 33 years. For every 100 females, there were 88.0 males. For every 100 females age 18 and over, there were 80.4 males.

The median income for a household in the CDP was $26,689, and the median income for a family was $30,118. Males had a median income of $29,000 versus $23,866 for females. The per capita income for the CDP was $14,243. About 22.4% of families and 22.9% of the population were below the poverty line, including 33.7% of those under age 18 and 13.8% of those age 65 or over.

== Education ==
The CDP is mostly within the Saginaw City School District. Portions south of Hess Avenue are within the Bridgeport-Spaulding Community School District.
