= Damon Lowery =

American basketball player

Hume City Broncos
- Title: Head coach
- League: Victorian Basketball League

Personal information
- Born: November 13, 1967 (age 59) (Note: Lowery's official NBL profiles had his birth date listed as November 13, 1969, but Lowery is quoted as being 21 years old in March 1989 and in November 2021 he is noted as turning 54, indicating that his year of birth is 1967.) Michigan, U.S.
- Listed height: 180 cm (5 ft 11 in)
- Listed weight: 80 kg (176 lb)

Career information
- High school: Buena Vista (Saginaw, Michigan)
- College: Alaska Southeast (1985–1989)
- NBA draft: 1989: undrafted
- Playing career: 1992–2013
- Position: Point guard
- Coaching career: 2012–present

Career history

Playing
- 1992–1993: Mildura Mavericks
- 1994–1998: Ballarat Miners
- 1999–2000: Kilsyth Cobras
- 2000–2004: Wollongong Hawks
- 2005: Hunter Pirates
- 2005: Kilsyth Cobras
- 2005–2006: Townsville Crocodiles
- 2006–2010: Eltham Wildcats
- 2011: Bulleen Boomers
- 2012: Hume City Broncos
- 2013: Camberwell Dragons

Coaching
- 2012: Hume City Broncos (assistant)
- 2018: Whittlesea Pacers (assistant)
- 2019; 2021: Whittlesea Pacers
- 2027–: Hume City Broncos

Career highlights
- NBL champion (2001); 2× ABA national champion (1994, 1995); 2× All-SEABL Team (1999, 2005); 2× All-District NAIA District I (1988, 1989)

Damon Lowery (born November 13, 1967) is an American basketball coach and former player who is currently head coach of the Hume City Broncos women's team in the Victorian Basketball League (VBL). He played college basketball for the University of Alaska Southeast before playing his entire professional career in Australia. He played in the South East Australian Basketball League (SEABL) during the 1990s and then debuted in the National Basketball League (NBL) in 2000 for the Wollongong Hawks. He won an NBL championship in his first season and went on to play six NBL seasons, four with the Hawks, one with the Hunter Pirates and one with the Townsville Crocodiles. He finish his career with eight seasons in the Big V.

After retiring as a player, Lowery started coaching in the Big V and later served as head coach of the Australia women's national 3x3 team at the 2024 Paris Olympics and 2026 Commonwealth Games.

== Early life ==
Lowery was born in the U.S. state of Michigan. His mother worked in the school district of Saginaw, Michigan.

Lowery attended Saginaw Buena Vista High School in Buena Vista Charter Township, where he played for the Knights basketball team. His high school coach was Norwaine Reed, who began coaching Buena Vista in 1983. Lowery was the sixth man in eleventh grade and then a starter in his senior year. He averaged seven assists and six steals as a senior in 1984–85 and was a teammate of future NBA player Mark Macon. Buena Vista lost in double overtime to Beecher High School in the 1985 state championship final. Lowery later stated: "I was so nervous in the state high school championship that I played a terrible game. We lost in double overtime. I vowed never to be nervous or to choke again."

Lowery travelled with Reed on road trips to play summer league in Detroit.

== College career ==
Lowery was a four-year starter for the University of Alaska Southeast (UAS) Whales men's basketball team between 1985 and 1989, becoming the first player to complete all four years of collegiate eligibility with the Whales. He was recruited by Whales coach Clair Markey in 1985 and considered transferring after his first year. He averaged around 10 points per game in his first season. In his sophomore year, only the third year of the Whales basketball program, the team made it to the first round of post-season play-off action. In his final season, he averaged 25.4 points per game. He was named All-District NAIA District I as a junior and senior after he led the district in scoring, assists, and steals both seasons. He was also named All-Northwest First Team and honorable mention All-American as a senior.

Due to changing his major in his junior year from business to education, Lowery did not graduate from UAS in 1989 despite having played out his eligibility. He returned to UAS in the fall to finish his senior year of studies in elementary education, and to work as a graduate assistant with the Whales men's basketball team in the 1989–90 season.

== Professional career ==
Lowery initially came to Australia to play for the Shoalhaven Tigers in New South Wales. He made his debut in the South East Australian Basketball League (SEABL) in 1992 for the Mildura Mavericks. He played a second season with Mildura in 1993.

Lowery joined the Ballarat Miners for the 1994 SEABL season and played five years for the Miners. In the 1994 Australian Basketball Association (ABA) national final, he had 17 points and seven assists to help the Miners win the ABA national championship with a 104–81 win over the Cairns Marlins. He helped the Miners win consecutive ABA national championships in 1995 with a 101–86 victory over the Frankston Blues in the final. He joined the Kilsyth Cobras in 1999 and led the team in scoring with 24 points per game, as the Cobras won the SEABL East Conference final and were ABA national final runners up. He was named to the 1999 All-SEABL East Team. He played a second season for Kilsyth in 2000. During his time in the SEABL, he was noted for his 85 per cent free throw accuracy.

Lowery joined the Wollongong Hawks of the National Basketball League (NBL) for the 2000–01 season. In game three of the Hawks' semi-final series against the Adelaide 36ers, Lowery hit three free throws with no time left in the fourth quarter to lift the Hawks to a 109–108 victory and a 2–1 series win. The Hawks went on to defeat the Townsville Crocodiles 2–1 in the grand final series to win the 2001 NBL championship. He was runner-up for NBL Rookie of the Year and NBL Best Sixth Man in his first season, and finished runner-up again for NBL Best Sixth Man in 2003. He played four seasons for the Hawks. In January 2005, he joined the Hunter Pirates for the rest of the 2004–05 NBL season to cover for injured guard and co-captain Brendan Mann. Lowery played his final season in the NBL in 2005–06 for the Townsville Crocodiles.

Lowery returned to the Kilsyth Cobras for the 2005 SEABL season and was voted into the All-SEABL South Team. He then played out his career in the Big V between 2006 and 2013. He played for the Eltham Wildcats for five years in Championship Men between 2006 and 2010. He then played one year for the Bulleen Boomers in the 2011 Championship Men season; one year for the Hume City Broncos in the 2012 Championship Men season; and one year for the Camberwell Dragons in the 2013 Division One Men season.

During his playing career, Lowery became a naturalised Australian.

== Coaching career ==
In 2012, Lowery served as an assistant coach while playing with the Hume City Broncos in the Big V Championship Division.

In 2018, Lowery served as an assistant coach with the Whittlesea Pacers women's team of the Big V Division One. He was elevated to head coach of the Pacers women's team for the 2019 season, with Whittlesea having been promoted to Championship Women. In 2019, he held the position of the Whittlesea Pacers coaching director. He returned to coach the Pacers' championship women in 2021. After the team had a winless 2021 season, Whittlesea was set to drop back down to Division One in 2022 and Lowery was set to coach the women's side again, but due to low player numbers, no Pacers women's team was entered in the Big V in 2022.

In 2019, Lowery became part of the coaching staff of the Australia women's national 3x3 team. He served as an assistant coach under David Biwer in 2021. In 2024, Lowery served as head coach of the Gangurrus at the Paris Olympics. He was re-appointed head coach of the Gangurrus in March 2025, leading the team to the 2025 FIBA 3x3 World Cup in Mongolia. In February 2026, it was announced that Lowery would continue to coach the Gangurrus at the 2026 Commonwealth Games. The team went on to win the gold medal.

On 1 October 2026, Lowery was appointed as the head coach of the Hume City Broncos women's team in the Victorian Basketball League (VBL) for the 2027 season.

== Personal life ==
Lowery's daughter, Isis, is a former collegiate gymnast for the Oregon State Beavers.

In 2021, Lowery joined the National Basketball League's broadcast team. As of 2026, he was part of the broadcast team for the NBL and WNBL.
