= Swan Valley School District =

School district in Michigan

Address
- 8380 O'Hern Road Saginaw, Saginaw County, Michigan, 48609; United States
- Coordinates: 43.40883°N 84.07988°W

District information
- Type: Public
- Grades: Pre-Kindergarten-12
- Superintendent: Mat McRae
- Schools: 5
- Budget: $32,104,000 2022-2023 expenditures
- NCES District ID: 2633410

Students and staff
- Students: 1,802 (2024-2025)
- Teachers: 98.79 (on an FTE basis) (2024-2025)
- Staff: 196.98 FTE (2024-2025)
- Student–teacher ratio: 18.24 (2024-2025)
- Athletic conference: Tri-Valley Conference
- District mascot: Vikings
- Colors: Purple and Yellow

Other information
- Intermediate school district: Saginaw Intermediate School District
- Website: www.swanvalleyschools.com

Swan Valley School District is a public school district near Saginaw, Michigan. It serves parts of Shields and parts of the townships of James, Swan Creek, and Thomas.

== History ==
Shields School, the oldest school in Swan Valley School District, opened in February 1952. Thomas Township School District No. 4, the district that built it, merged with several other districts over the next fourteen years, becoming Swan Valley School District in 1966.

Shields Junior High School opened in 1957. A campus (or "educational park," according to Prine, Toshach and Spears, the district's architectural firm) was planned on Van Wormer Road. A high school and Havens Elementary would be added to the site of the existing Shields Junior High school. Construction on Havens Elementary began in May 1970.

The high school was established with grades nine and ten in fall 1971 within Shields Junior High. The district sent juniors and seniors to Arthur Hill High School in Saginaw Public Schools until the new high school was completed. The first Swan Valley High principal, Daniel D. Craig, resigned after three hours because he regretted leaving his job as a teacher at Freeland High School. The new high school building opened in fall 1972.

A 2021 bond issue funded a 600-seat performing arts center at the high school.

== Schools ==
Schools in Swan Valley School District
School	Address	Notes
Swan Valley High School	8400 O' Hern Road, Saginaw	Grades 9–12. Built 1972.
Swan Valley Middle School	453 Van Wormer, Saginaw	Grades 6–8. Built 1957.
R.B. Havens Elementary	457 Van Wormer, Saginaw	Grades K-5. Built 1970.
Shields Elementary	6900 Stroebel Rd., Saginaw	Grades K–5. Built 1952.
Swan Valley Learning Center	8400 O' Hern Road, Saginaw	Preschool and child care
Swan Valley Adult, Alternative and Community Education	8400 O'Hern Road, Saginaw	Alternative high school
