= Buena Vista School District (Michigan) =

US school district

Location
- Buena Vista, Michigan US-MI United States
- Coordinates: 43.41967°N 83.87933°W

District information
- Type: Public; Tax-collecting unit (Since closing as a school district)
- Grades: Pre-kindergarten through 12
- Established: 1956
- Closed: July 2013
- Schools: Elementary 2 Middle 1 High 1
- Budget: US$12,528,000 (2010-11)
- NCES District ID: 2607230

Students and staff
- Students: 428 (2012-13)
- Teachers: 37 (2012-13)
- Staff: 58.12 (2012-13)
- Student–teacher ratio: 11.57 (2012-13)
- District mascot: Knights
- Colors: Royal blue and White

Other information
- Intermediate school district: Saginaw Intermediate School District
- Schedule: M-F except state holidays
- Website: bvsd.k12.mi.us

Buena Vista School District was a school district headquartered in Buena Vista Charter Township, Michigan, and part of the Saginaw Intermediate School District (Saginaw ISD). As of July 2013, the school district closed and became a tax-collecting district of the Saginaw ISD to pay the district's outstanding debts.

== History ==
=== Formation ===
| Superintendent | start | end |
|---|---|---|
| Joseph Barr | 1955 | July 1970 |
| James A. Vitany | July 1970 | June 1978 |
| James B. Smith | June 1978 | 1985 |
| T.C. Wallace | 1985 | July 1995 |
| Vivian Keys Brown | July 1995 | November 2000 |
| Elmer Hollenbeck (interim) | November 2000 | June 2001 |
| Henry L. McQueen | June 2001 | March 2003 |
| Vivian Keys Brown (i) | March 2003 | August 2003 |
| Deborah T. Clarke | August 2003 | June 2007 |
| Sharron Jenkins Norman | June 2007 | August 2011 |
| Patricia Scott (i) | August 2011 | August 2012 |
| Deborah Hunter-Harvill | August 2012 | July 30, 2013 |

The district was formed in 1955 when the Saginaw City School District demanded that any rural schools sending students to Saginaw High School either have a joint program or join the district. A Buena Vista study committee recommended that instead the township's area school districts consolidate into a new district. In 1956, the consolidation proposal received 94% approval. While the Ricker, Leidlein, Star and Highland Park districts participated in the consolidation, the Indiantown, Service, Downes, and Harding school districts did not join the consolidated school district. The first superintendent of the new district was Joseph Barr, Ricker School District's Superintendent at the time of the consolidation. A $2.5 million building bond was passed to support the new district.

Buena Vista School District began its first school year in 1956–57. Ricker Junior High School was attended by all 7th through 9th grade students, while 10th through 12th grade students continued to attend Saginaw School District high schools. Former Ricker and Leidlein students attended Ricker, while Star students were moved to Highland Park School. Each year following the inaugural school year, an additional grade was added to the district until 1961-1962 when the district graduated its first senior class from Buena Vista High School, which had opened in 1959.

=== Middle years ===
In July 1970, Superintendent Barr died, and James A. Vitany replaced him.

The high school was cited by the Michigan Bureau of School Services in 1972 for not having a six-hour day at the high school, which could have resulted in the school district losing its accreditation. The high school's capacity was 800, but with 1,100 students, the district used a split-schedule to deal with the overcrowding. Ultimately, the district did not lose its accreditation.

In 1993, a ROTC program was started with 60 students. In 1994, the marching band was relaunched by Alvin Level, a 1987 graduate from the school district and music teacher. In January 1999, after resigning from the school district, Alvin Level and his spouse, another school district employee, were sentenced for various embezzlement charges.

The FIRST Robotics Team was formed in 1997 and went on to take place 17th out of 31 teams in state competition in March of that year. In April 1998, FIRST took 116th place out of 165 teams in a national competition.

From November 2000 to August 2003, the district went through five different interim or permanent superintendents with one serving twice. A December 2002 review showed that the district was losing pupils and funding, but not a similar decrease in staffing or spending. The review also showed that $1.5 million in spending cuts were needed, or the district would go bankrupt by 2003. The review recommended that two elementary schools should be closed and sold.

Only 52% of the high school's seniors graduated in June 2007. A sign of further decline, the school's last yearbook was published in Spring 2008. With the high school's repeated failure to meet No Child Left Behind standards for improvement, state officials in May 2010 gave the district's board options to restructure the district. Options for the high school included turning it into a charter school, turning it over to the State of Michigan, outsourcing its operations, replacing all or most of the school's staff, or "restructure the school's 'government arrangement' to make fundamental reforms". In September 2010, the Michigan Department of Education stated that the district had the lowest performing schools in the state. In October 2010, a Circuit Court Judge forced two board members off the board for multiple counts of felony election fraud. In January 2011 the school board voted to close Brunkow Elementary School.

Beginning in 2010, the federal government gave the school district $2.5 million to transform the district. The district also received $1.3 million per year in federal Title I funds, which are designed to help high-poverty schools. The funding did little to advance the students's achievement. Results from the 2012 state exams showed that 3rd, 6th, and 8th grade students lacked proficiency in key subjects such as math, reading, social studies, and science.

| Count date | students |
|---|---|
| February 1998 | 1,745 |
| February 2007 | 1,128 |
| February 2008 | 1,054 |
| October 2010 | 798 |
| February 2011 | 761 |
| October 2011 | 651 |
| February 2013 | 433 |

Student enrollment went from 760 in 2011–2012 to 400 in 2012–2013, a 47% decrease which resulted in a decrease in state funding - which is based on student enrollment. While enrollment was reduced, overhead costs for building operation and salaries stayed consistent or increased.

=== Budget crisis ===
The Wolverine Secure Treatment Center, a private juvenile detention facility, ended its contract with the district in June 2012. The district received $400,000 in the 2012–2013 school year for educating 90 students at Wolverine Center, an alternative school, but its contract with the center had expired at the end of the 2011–2012 school year. As of May 2013, about 500 students from the Buena Vista district were using the school of choice program to attend other school districts.

In July 2012, as the school board hired Superintendent Deborah Hunter-Harvill, several employees quit and 22 other employees were laid off - including an interim principal - to stem off a $1.2 million budget deficit. In August 2012, the sports programs began competing in Class D as the high school population dropped below 217 Class C minimum.

Results from the February 2013 Michigan Educational Assessment Program showed that 4th, 5th, 6th, 8th, and 9th grade students lacked proficiency in key subjects such as math, reading, social studies, and science.

On April 5, 2013, the district sent the Michigan Department of Education a deficit reduction plan that was later rejected. Also in April, the school district considered four building closing plans to deal with a $1 million deficit. At an April 25 meeting, a decision on the plans were delayed while the state assisted with another possible plan, while outsourcing transportation was being looked at by the district's administration.

On May 1, the district announced that the district would run out of money and unable to pay employees as of May 24, and was working toward declaring a financial emergency. The district also announced that it would not receive state aid for April, May or June in order to repay the Wolverine Secure Treatment Center funding the district received after their contract with the Wolverine Center had expired. The school board president asked teachers to continue teaching through the rest of the school year. On May 3, it was revealed that the district had a $2 million loan due August 20 to the Michigan Department of Treasury, but could get a replacement loan of up to $1.2 million, leaving $800,000 to be paid back by the August 20 deadline.

On July 10, the Saginaw ISD stepped in to pay various expenses for the district, such as security, utilities, maintenance, and insurance. On July 17, the school board selected charter management company Leona Group on a volunteer basis to intercede with state officials in the district's case. The district would then manage the district under the superintendent and board. A dissolution and disorganization meeting for the district was held by State Superintendent Mike Flanagan and State Treasurer Andy Dillon on July 18.

Buena Vista missed a deadline to find loans or extra funding by July 22. With no loans or other funding, the state ordered that the district be dissolved. On July 30, 2013, the Saginaw Intermediate School District Board of Trustees officially dissolved Buena Vista Schools. The Buena Vista District area was split up between three other districts: Saginaw City School District, Bridgeport-Spaulding Community School District, and Frankenmuth School District. All board members of Saginaw ISD agreed to close Buena Vista schools.

=== Post-closure ===
With the district dissolved, it became a tax-collecting unit, under the intermediate school district's control, to pay off debts of more than $5.7 million. The Saginaw City School District acquired the Buena Vista headquarters building and all five school buildings. One of the buildings, the Ricker Center and Ricker Annex, was leased to Delta College for a campus. On January 15, 2014, Saginaw and Delta entered a short-term lease for the building as Delta determined the future for their Saginaw area campus.

Saginaw City School District also acquired the majority of the school district territory. This territory included areas north of Hess Avenue except for the parcels located between Airport Road and Townline Road that are south of Holland. The Bridgeport-Spaulding District took property west of Airport and south of Hess as well as areas south of East Holland Road between Airport and Towerline. The property east of airport road was assigned to the Frankenmuth District. Ultimately, 135 former Buena Vista students entered Bridgeport-Spaulding schools and 109 former Buena Vista students began attending Saginaw schools. The Francis Reh Academy, a charter school, received 17 ex-Buena Vista students. Saginaw Township Community Schools had six new students using school of choice who had previously attended Buena Vista. Reese Public Schools had three additional ex-Buena Vista students. Frankenmuth received ten more students through the school of choice program who had previously lived in the Buena Vista boundary.

== Sports ==
The district's Knights football team in 1966 was selected as the polled state Class B championship as there was no tournament. The team went 9–0 with 403 points to its opponents' 37. The team repeated as undefeated state champions in 1967.

From 1979 to 1993, the school had a successful boys basketball program, with the team competing in the state Class B championship game seven times, winning four times and runners up three times. In 1979, the team lost to Muskegon Heights in the championship game, and in 1984 lost to Oak Park. In the 1985 championship game, the team lost to Beecher, but the next year defeated Beecher, 33–32. In 1987, student Mark Macon was named Michigan's Mr. Basketball. In 1989, the team won the state championship against St. Joseph, 41–37, and in 1992 against Grandville Calvin Christian, 54–44. The team was crowned Class B state champions in 1993 after a win over Muskegon Heights, 69–52. Two Class C basketball state championships were won in March 2004 against Charlevoix, 63-52 and in March 2006 after defeating Berrien Springs, 57–52.
