= Community Baptist Christian School =

Location
- 8331 Gratiot Road; Shields, Saginaw County, Michigan 48609; United States; 43.41419°N 84.07788°W

Information
- Type: Private elementary, middle and high school
- Denomination: Baptists
- Established: 1981
- Status: Open
- CEEB code: 233284
- NCES School ID: 02038134
- Teaching staff: 11 (2025-26)
- Grades: PK to 12
- Gender: Co-ed
- Enrollment: 60 (2025-26)
- Student to teacher ratio: 6 (2025-26)
- Mascot: Kings
- Intermediate school district: Saginaw Intermediate School District
- Website: Official website

Community Baptist Christian School is a small private Christian school located in Shields, Michigan, which is a suburb of Saginaw, Michigan. It was started by Community Baptist Church in 1981. As of 2025, it enrolls approximately 60 students.

== Sports ==
Community Baptist Christian School has many options for sports: men's soccer, ladies volleyball, men's and ladies' basketball, and men's and ladies golf. CBCS plays competitively against other Christian schools in Michigan Association of Christian Schools.
