= Shields, Michigan =

- Census-designated place (CDP) & unincorporated community
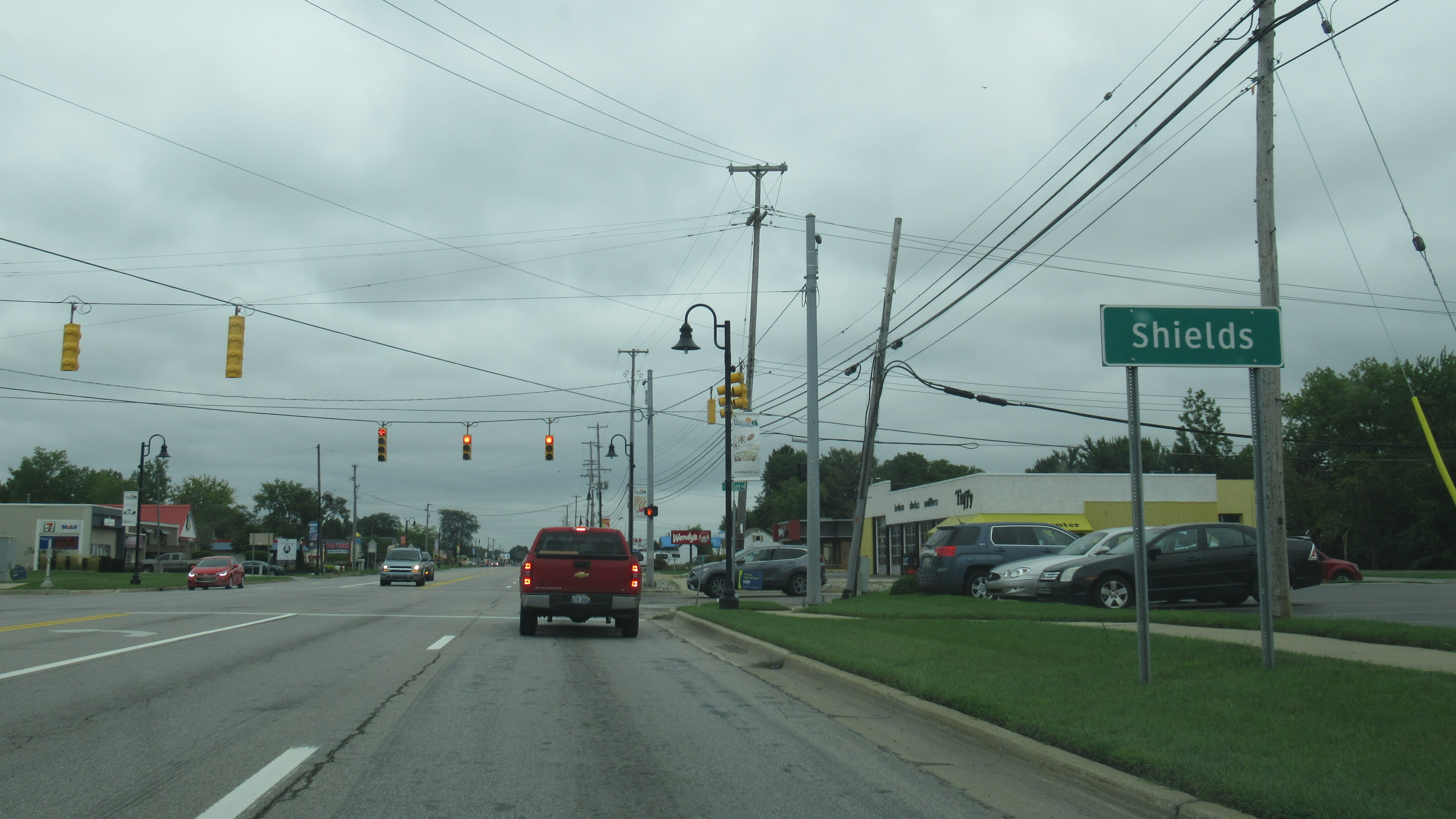
- Road signage looking east along M-46

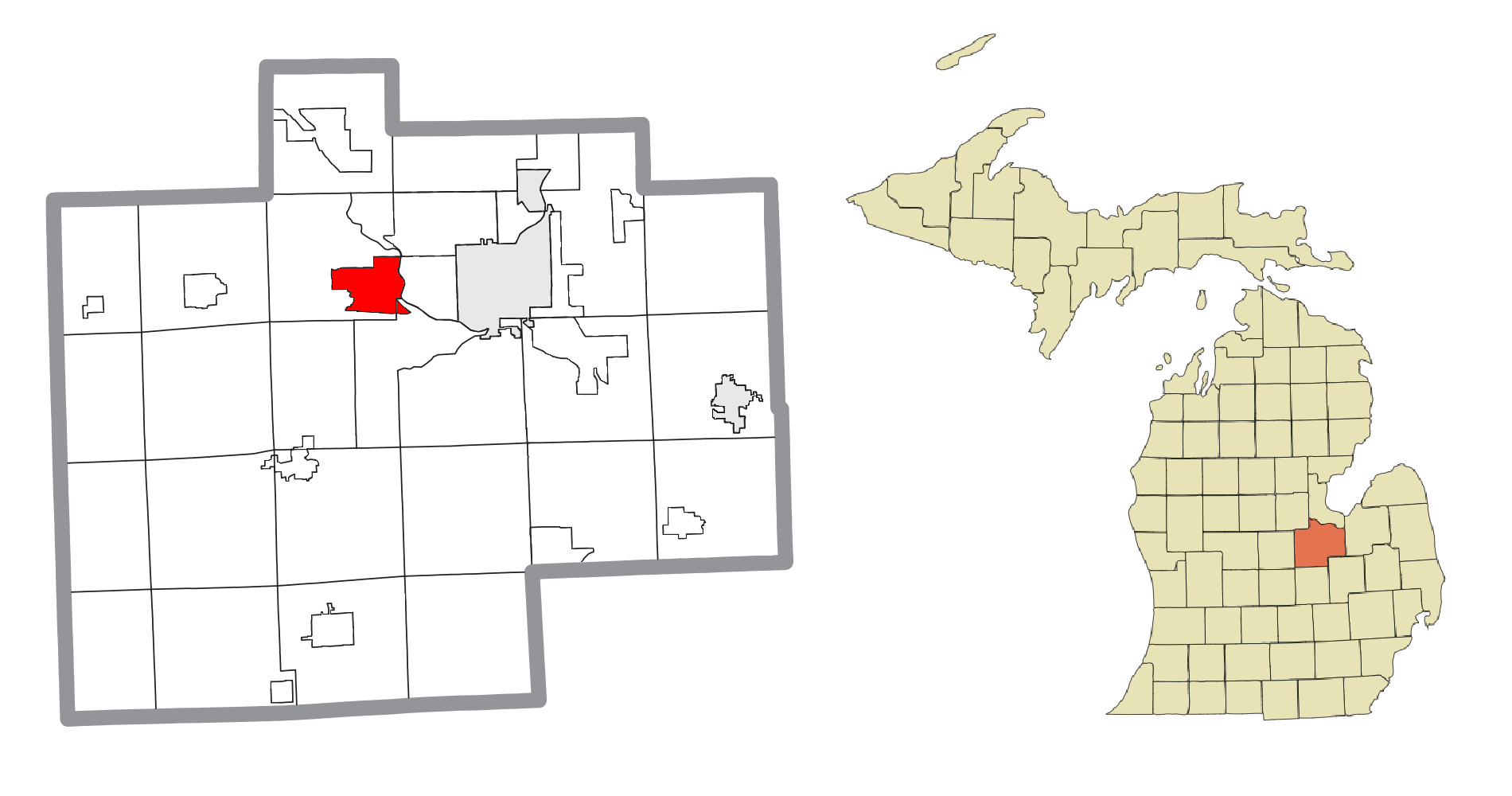
- Location within Saginaw County

- Location within the state of Michigan Location within the United States
- Coordinates: 43°25′16″N 84°04′29″W
- Country: United States
- State: Michigan
- County: Saginaw
- Townships: James and Thomas

Area
  - Total: 8.03 sq mi (20.81 km^{2})
  - Land: 7.88 sq mi (20.40 km^{2})
  - Water: 0.16 sq mi (0.41 km^{2})
- Elevation: 604 ft (184 m)

Population (2020)
  - Total: 7,035
  - Density: 893.0/sq mi (344.78/km^{2})
- Time zone: UTC-5 (Eastern (EST))
  - Summer (DST): UTC-4 (EDT)
- ZIP code(s): 48609 (Saginaw)
- Area code: 989
- FIPS code: 26-73560
- GNIS feature ID: 2393234

Shields is an unincorporated community in Thomas Township, Saginaw County in the U.S. state of Michigan. It is also a census-designated place (CDP) for statistical purposes, but with no legal status as an incorporated municipality. The population of the CDP was 7,035 at the 2020 census.

The community of Shields is located on M-46/Gratiot Road just west of the Tittabawassee River. In the 2000 census, the CDP included an area bounded on the east by the Tittabawassee River, north to State Street, west to N. Miller Road, south to Geddes Road, west to N. Thomas Road, south to M-46/Gratiot Road, east to Swan Creek, south to the railroad crossing on Schomaker Road, east along the rail tracks to Stroebel Road, northwest to Ronald Drive and east to the Tittabawassee River. Most of the CDP is within Thomas Township with a small portion extending into northwest James Township.

== History ==
A post office operated in Shields from August 15, 1894 until Dec 15, 1902.

The Shields brothers William and Arthur were born in 1826 and 1830 respectively in County Armagh, Ireland. Along with their family, they immigrated to Michigan settling in Thomas Township in 1842. The bachelor brothers settled on 160 acres (0.65 km^{2}) in section three. Eventually the southeastern part of the Township came to be known as the Shields area.

Paines is a place within James Township and the CDP located on Dutch Road between River Roads and Stroebel Roads. Paines was first settled in 1871 and named for A. B. Paine, a local brick manufacturer. It was a station at the junction of the Michigan Central and the Pere Marquette rail lines. A post office named "Painesville" was established on October 10, 1873, closed on May 29, 1876, and reopened on July 14, 1876. The office was renamed "Paines" on October 19, 1880 and continued until June 30, 1904.

== Geography ==
According to the United States Census Bureau, the CDP has a total area of 6.6 square miles (17 km^{2}), of which 6.5 square miles (17 km^{2}) is land and 0.1 square miles (0.26 km^{2}) (1.06%) is water.

== Demographics ==
Historical population
Census	Pop.	Note	%±
2020	7,035		—
U.S. Decennial Census

=== 2020 census ===
As of the 2020 census, Shields had a population of 7,035. The median age was 48.8 years. 18.7% of residents were under the age of 18 and 27.6% of residents were 65 years of age or older. For every 100 females there were 90.3 males, and for every 100 females age 18 and over there were 85.8 males age 18 and over.

92.7% of residents lived in urban areas, while 7.3% lived in rural areas.

There were 3,043 households in Shields, of which 24.5% had children under the age of 18 living in them. Of all households, 51.4% were married-couple households, 13.9% were households with a male householder and no spouse or partner present, and 29.0% were households with a female householder and no spouse or partner present. About 30.1% of all households were made up of individuals and 18.4% had someone living alone who was 65 years of age or older.

There were 3,202 housing units, of which 5.0% were vacant. The homeowner vacancy rate was 0.8% and the rental vacancy rate was 8.8%.

Racial composition as of the 2020 census
Race	Number	Percent
White	6,356	90.3%
Black or African American	116	1.6%
American Indian and Alaska Native	15	0.2%
Asian	71	1.0%
Native Hawaiian and Other Pacific Islander	1	0.0%
Some other race	113	1.6%
Two or more races	363	5.2%
Hispanic or Latino (of any race)	411	5.8%

=== 2000 census ===
As of the census of 2000, there were 6,590 people, 2,508 households, and 1,875 families residing in the CDP. The population density was 1,007.9 inhabitants per square mile (389.2/km^{2}). There were 2,587 housing units at an average density of 395.7 per square mile (152.8/km^{2}). The racial makeup of the CDP was 96.74% White, 0.80% African American, 0.27% Native American, 0.52% Asian, 0.74% from other races, and 0.93% from two or more races. Hispanic or Latino of any race were 3.32% of the population.

There were 2,508 households, out of which 31.8% had children under the age of 18 living with them, 63.4% were married couples living together, 8.5% had a female householder with no husband present, and 25.2% were non-families. 21.7% of all households were made up of individuals, and 8.7% had someone living alone who was 65 years of age or older. The average household size was 2.56 and the average family size was 2.98.

In the CDP, the population was spread out, with 24.4% under the age of 18, 7.6% from 18 to 24, 25.3% from 25 to 44, 28.5% from 45 to 64, and 14.2% who were 65 years of age or older. The median age was 41 years. For every 100 females, there were 90.3 males. For every 100 females age 18 and over, there were 88.5 males.

=== Income and poverty ===
According to 2010 ACS data, the median income for a household in the CDP was $52,457, and the median income for a family was $62,566. Males working full-time and year-round had a median income of $44,018 versus $39,471 for full-time, year-round working females. The per capita income for the CDP was $24,397. About 4.4% of families and 4.7% of the population were below the poverty line, including 5.1% of those under age 18 and 7.6% of those age 65 or over.

== Education ==
It is mostly in the Swan Valley School District with some in the Hemlock Public School District.
