= Wolverine Secure Treatment Center =

Location
- 2424 North Outer Drive; Buena Vista Township, Saginaw County, Michigan 48601; United States; 43.45709°N 83.89280°W

Information
- Type: Private juvenile detention facility and charter school
- Status: Open
- School district: Wolverine Academy
- NCES School ID: 260102608335
- Teaching staff: 11.00 (2012–13)
- Grades: 6th to 12th
- Gender: Male
- Age: 12 to 21
- Enrollment: 97 (2012–13)
  - Grade 6: 1 (2012–13)
  - Grade 7: 2 (2012–13)
  - Grade 8: 2 (2012–13)
  - Grade 9: 34 (2012–13)
  - Grade 10: 37 (2012–13)
  - Grade 11: 16 (2012–13)
  - Grade 12: 5 (2012–13)
- Student to teacher ratio: 8.82 (2012–13)
- Owner and operator: Wolverine Human Services
- Size: Nearly 62,000 square feet (5,800 m^{2})
- Intermediate school district: Saginaw Intermediate School District
- Website: Official website

The Wolverine Secure Treatment Center (WSTC) is a private juvenile detention facility and charter school located at 2424 North Outer Drive in Buena Vista Township, Michigan, United States. The facility is owned and operated by Wolverine Human Services, and is a part of the Saginaw Intermediate School District.

== Services and programs ==
The Wolverine Secure Treatment Center was a secure residential behavior treatment program for males ages 12–21. Programming includes individual, group and family counseling, psychiatric and psychological services, sex offender treatment, substance abuse treatment, crisis intervention, life skills assessment, restorative justice techniques, and trauma informed services.

Educational programming is provided by Wolverine Academy and includes high school completion, General Educational Development (GED), vocational education, and college classes provided by Delta College and Saginaw Valley State University. Participants in the reintegration program use an on-site apartment space to learn home skills, such as cooking and cleaning.

Participants begin in the intake, orientation, and diagnostic unit. There, they are assessed and it is determined which specialized treatment program the participant will be placed in.

== Facility ==
The Wolverine Secure Treatment Center facility is nearly 62,000 square feet (5,800 m^{2}) and is secured by a 16-foot-tall (4.9 m) perimeter fence. An audio and video surveillance is operated by a master control office in the front of the facility, and allows the facility's security to operate secure doors.

The facility comprises ten units which each house ten individuals, providing the facility with a capacity of 100 participants. Each unit includes one classroom.

There is also a 30,000-square-foot (2,800 m^{2}) indoor multipurpose facility area that includes two basketball courts, boxing ring, ping-pong tables, and volleyball court.

== History ==
The Wolverine Secure Treatment Center opened in September 1997, becoming the first privately owned and operated secure detention facility for juvenile offenders in Michigan. As of 2009, the facility had served young people from 55 of Michigan's 83 counties.

Until the end of the 2011–2012 school year, educational services were provided by the Buena Vista School District. In June 2012, the center ended its contract with the district. However, the district received $400,000 in the 2012–2013 school year for educating 90 students at Wolverine Center, despite its contract with the center having expired at the end of the 2011–2012 school year. On May 1, 2013, the Buena Vista School District announced that it would not receive state aid for April, May or June in order to repay the Wolverine Secure Treatment Center funding the district received after their contract with the center had expired.

Starting in the 2012–2013 school year, the center became a charter school under Saginaw Valley State University.

In 2015, the Tuscola Intermediate School District took over the school and is now called Wolverine Education Center. The school educates approximately 100 students at a time with small, personalized classroom format.
