= Saginaw Charter Township, Michigan =

Saginaw Township, Michigan
- Charter township
- Saginaw Charter Township
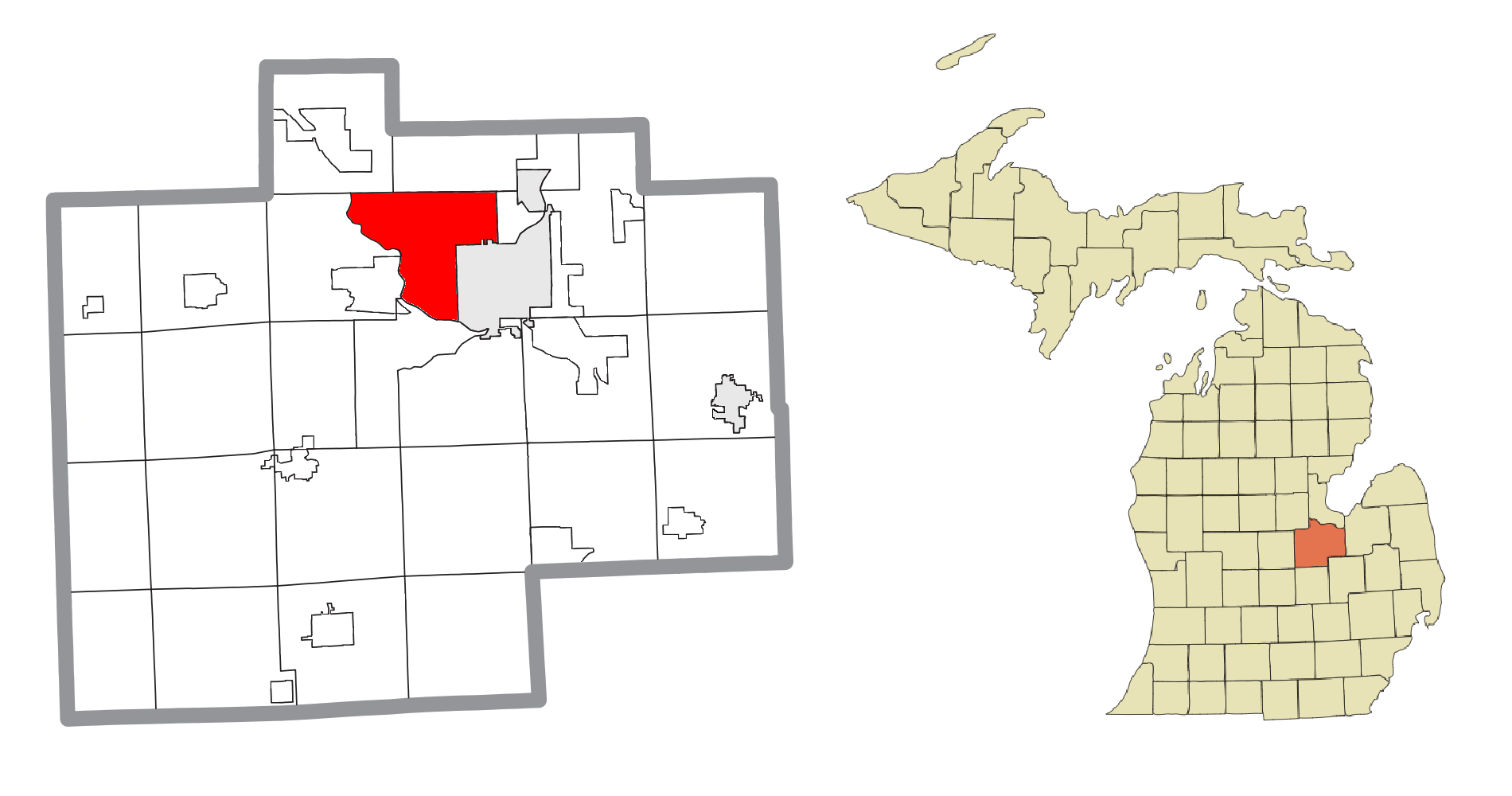
- Location within Saginaw County

- Location within the state of Michigan
- Coordinates: 43°26′41″N 84°00′35″W
- Country: United States
- State: Michigan
- County: Saginaw
- Established: 1831

Government
  - Supervisor: Gary Fahndrich
  - Clerk: Lisa Ingram

Area
  - Total: 24.8 sq mi (64.2 km^{2})
  - Land: 24.6 sq mi (63.8 km^{2})
  - Water: 0.15 sq mi (0.4 km^{2})
- Elevation: 620 ft (190 m)

Population (2020)
  - Total: 41,679
  - Density: 1,694.3/sq mi (654.2/km^{2})
- Time zone: UTC-5 (Eastern (EST))
  - Summer (DST): UTC-4 (EDT)
- ZIP code(s): 48602–48604, 48608, 48638, 48663 (Saginaw)
- Area code: 989
- FIPS code: 26-70540
- GNIS feature ID: 1627021
- Website: Official website

Saginaw Charter Township is a charter township of Saginaw County in the U.S. state of Michigan. The population was 41,679 at the 2020 census. The city of Saginaw is adjacent to the township to the southeast, but is administratively autonomous.

The township is also a component of the Saginaw Metropolitan Statistical Area and the greater Saginaw-Midland-Bay City Combined Statistical Area in the Mid/Central Michigan region.

== Geography ==
According to the United States Census Bureau, the township has a total area of 24.8 square miles (64 km^{2}), of which 24.6 square miles (64 km^{2}) is land and 0.1 square miles (0.26 km^{2}) (0.56%) is water.

== Demographics ==
Historical population
Census	Pop.	Note	%±
2000	39,657		—
2010	40,840		3.0%
2020	41,679		2.1%

As of the census of 2000, there were 39,657 people, 17,096 households, and 10,685 families residing in the township. The population density was 1,608.9 inhabitants per square mile (621.2/km^{2}). There were 17,859 housing units at an average density of 724.5 per square mile (279.7/km^{2}). The racial makeup of the township was 88.77% White, 5.28% African American, 0.27% Native American, 2.68% Asian, 0.01% Pacific Islander, 1.47% from other races, and 1.52% from two or more races. Hispanic or Latino of any race were 4.17% of the population.

There were 17,096 households, out of which 25.8% had children under the age of 18 living with them, 51.3% were married couples living together, 8.8% had a female householder with no husband present, and 37.5% were non-families. 31.9% of all households were made up of individuals, and 15.0% had someone living alone who was 65 years of age or older. The average household size was 2.27 and the average family size was 2.88.

In the township, 21.1% of the population was under the age of 18, 9.2% was from 18 to 24, 24.7% from 25 to 44, 25.7% from 45 to 64, and 19.2% was 65 years of age or older. The median age was 42 years. For every 100 females, there were 88.2 males. For every 100 females age 18 and over, there were 83.4 males.

The median income for a household in the township was $45,147, and the median income for a family was $60,625. Males had a median income of $49,084 versus $30,620 for females. The per capita income for the township was $25,759. 6.6% of the population and 4.4% of families were below the poverty line. 7.0% of those are under the age of 18 and 8.0% of those 65 and older were living below the poverty line.

== History ==
Saginaw Township predates its parent county. When Saginaw Township was organized as part of Oakland County in 1831, in accordance with an 1830 act of Michigan's Territorial Legislature, it covered all of today's Saginaw County (organized in 1835) and part of Bay, Genesee and Midland counties. As the boundaries for these counties were set, and new townships within Saginaw County organized, Saginaw Township was reduced to its present boundaries. The territory of the present City of Saginaw west of the Saginaw River was taken from Saginaw Township when the city of Saginaw was incorporated in 1857.

In May 2020, Saginaw County residents (including parts of Saginaw Township, Thomas Township, and Tittabawassee Township), along with various Midland County residents (including parts of the city of Midland, the village of Sanford, Edenville Township, Midland Township, Lincoln Township, Homer Township and Dow Chemical) were forced to evacuate due to high flooding caused by the breach of the Edenville and Sanford dams.

== Education ==
=== Public school districts ===
- Saginaw Township Community Schools

=== Public high schools ===
- Heritage High School

=== Private high schools ===
- Nouvel Catholic Central High School
- Valley Lutheran High School
