= Swan Valley High School =

Location
- 8400 O'Hern Road; Saginaw, Michigan 48609; United States; 43°24′40″N 84°04′41″W

Information
- Type: Public high school
- Established: 1971
- Status: Open
- School district: Swan Valley School District
- CEEB code: 233333
- NCES School ID: 263341006876
- Principal: Brad Erlenbeck
- Teaching staff: 28.45 (FTE)
- Grades: 9-12
- Enrollment: 519 (2023–2024)
- Student to teacher ratio: 18.24
- Colors: Purple and white
- Athletics conference: Tri-Valley
- Nickname: Vikings
- Website: https://www.swanvalleyschools.com/o/svhs

Swan Valley High School is a public high school in the Swan Valley School District of Thomas Township, Michigan. Swan Valley High School is part of the Tri-Valley Central Conference. Swan Valley has been part of the Mid-Michigan B, TVC East, TVC West, and the TVC Central conferences since its start in 1971. Swan Valley's first graduating class chose the Viking to be their mascot, as well as voting in the school colors purple and white. The sports teams of Swan Valley were then divided up between the Vikings and the Valkyries to show individual support for both male and female teams. Later the sports teams were simply called the Vikings and the Lady Vikes.

== History ==
On June 13, 1966, voters approved the formation of a unified school district. Soon after, voters also approved a $3.9 million bond for the construction of a new elementary (Robert B. Havens which was completed in 1971) and a new high school on 87 acres of land where those buildings sit today.

Ground was broken for Swan Valley High School in July 1971 led by board president Dick Middlebrook and Assistant superintendent Marvin Johnson. The first high school graduation was in 1974 and there have been nearly 7000 alumni since that time. Swan Valley High School is a highly rated public high school in Thomas Township, MI, on the outskirts of Saginaw, MI. In the 2022–2023 academic year, Swan Valley is listed among the top 10 schools in the Saginaw area. The School district is ranked top three in the Saginaw area.

== Demographics ==
The demographic breakdown of the 573 students enrolled in 2021-22 was:

- Male - 58.2%
- Female - 41.7%
- American Indian/Alaska Native - 1%
- Asian- 0%
- Black - 2.2%
- Hispanic - 12.9%
- Native Hawaiian/Pacific Islander - 0%
- White - 80.6%
- Multiracial - 3.6%

30.5% of the students were eligible for free or reduced-cost lunch.

== Academics ==
Swan Valley offers the following Advanced Placement (AP) courses that can be taken for college credit: AP World History: Modern, AP Calculus, AP Computer Science Principles, AP English Literature and Composition. For those students who qualify through the IEPC process, the high school offers special education programming. Each student is assigned a case load teacher who monitors his or her progress through graduation. The average ACT score for the school is 25 has an average SAT score of 1160. Swan Valley purchased iPads for every student shortly after the 2014–2015 school year began. The iPads are combined with an education concept known as one-to-one learning, a program new to the state of Michigan. The school utilizes a trimester system.

== Athletics ==
The Swan Valley Vikings are a class B school and currently part of the Tri-Valley Conference Central Division. Swan Valley High School offers several varsity sports, including:

- Football
- Class B State Champ Runner ups 2017
- Basketball (boys and girls)
- Competitive Cheer (girls)
- Pom Pon - Class B State Champs 2012 (not MHSAA sanctioned)
- Cross Country (boys and girls)
- Soccer (boys and girls)
- Bowling (boys and girls)
  - Boys State Champs 2016
  - Girls state champs 2008
- Golf (boys)
- Track & Field (boys and girls)
- Volleyball
- Wrestling
- Ice Hockey (boys)
- Baseball
  - State champs 2001
- Softball (girls)
  - State champs 1986
State Runner ups- 1994, 2002, 2012, 2013

== Notable alumni ==
- Mitch Jebb (2020) - MLB baseball player
- Daryl Szarenski (1986) - Three time Olympic qualifier - Pistol

== Distinguished Alumni Award winners ==
Dr. Donald R. Gilbert 1998

Jeffrey A. Castillo 1999

Edwin C. Flattery 2000

Susan Whaley-Brady 2001

John Owen Hamilton 2002

Sharyl Ann Majorski-Briggs 2003

Luann Freier Marx 2004

Dr. Tari Lynch-Caris 2005

Margo Houston-Barocko 2006

Colonel Merrily D. Madero 2007

Stephen Sowuleski 2008

Heidi Erlenbeck 2009

Lieutenant Colonel Michael Weiss 2010

Tracy A. Weber, PhD. 2011

J. Coffey 2012

Keith Martin 2013

Honorable Laura Frawley 2014

Mike Cousins 2015

Lieutenant Erica Ziel 2016

Jay Fosgitt 2017

Tom Kluck 2018

Theo Keith 2019 - Two time Grammy winning political reporter

Lynda Thayer 2020

Mark Garabelli 2021

Bethany Campbell Charlton 2022

== See also ==
- List of schools in Saginaw, Michigan
