= Saginaw County H.W. Browne Airport =

Saginaw County Harry W. Browne Airport
- IATA: ~~HYX~~; ICAO: KHYX; FAA LID: HYX

Summary
- Airport type: Public
- Owner: Saginaw County, Michigan
- Serves: Saginaw, Michigan
- Location: Buena Vista Charter Township, Michigan
- Elevation AMSL: 601 ft (183 m)
- Coordinates: 43°26′0.3″N 083°51′44.4″W
- Website: www.KHYX.org

Map
- Location of airport in Michigan HYX (the United States)

Runways
| Direction | Length | | Surface |
| Direction | ft | m | Surface |
|---|---|---|---|
| 5/23 | 2,952 | 900 | Asphalt |
| 10/28 | 5,002 | 1,525 | Asphalt |

Statistics (2021)
- Aircraft operations: 12,000
- Based aircraft: 41
- Source: Federal Aviation Administration

Saginaw County H.W. Browne Airport (IATA: ~~HYX~~, ICAO: KHYX, FAA LID: HYX) is a county-owned, public-use airport located in Buena Vista Township, east of Saginaw, in Saginaw County, Michigan, United States. It is included in the Federal Aviation Administration (FAA) National Plan of Integrated Airport Systems for 2017–2021, in which it is categorized as a local general aviation facility.

== History ==
The airport was founded as early as 1912, when it was known as Janes Street Field. Later known as Saginaw's Municipal Airport, the county took it over in the 1970s and renamed it for the late Harry W. Browne, a labor and political leader and local mortician.

== Facilities and aircraft ==
H.W. Browne Airport covers an area of 293 acres (119 ha) at an elevation of 601 feet (183 m) above mean sea level. It has two asphalt paved runways: 9/27 is 5,002 by 100 feet (1,525 x 30 m) and 5/23 is 2,952 by 60 feet (900 x 18 m).

In 2016, the airport embarked on a project to rebuild and rehabilitate runway 9/27. The county was required to purchase land around the airport to support the project as well as the acquisition of aviation easements for two properties, rights of first refusal on two more properties and a development agreement in place with Buena Vista Township. The airport received a $2 million grant from the Federal Aviation Administration in 2017 to help rehabilitate part of runway 9/27.

The airport has a fixed-base operator that offers fuel – both avgas and jet fuel – as well as general maintenance, courtesy transportation, a conference room, a crew lounge, showers, and more.

For the 12-month period ending December 31, 2021, the airport had 12,000 aircraft operations, an average of 33 per day, composed entirely of general aviation. At that time there were 41 aircraft based at this airport: 29 single-engine and 7 multi-engine airplanes, 4 jet aircraft, and 1 helicopter.

== Accidents and incidents ==
- On June 26, 2004, a Beech Model 23 Musketeer was substantially damaged when it struck a runway sign during landing on runway 27 at the H. W. Browne Airport. The pilot reported that as the airplane approached the runway, he "felt wind push the airplane up. [He] recovered and continued in for landing. Shortly after the plane simply dropped from the sky and bounced off and up. [He] regained control, leveling wings when a sudden gust of wind caught [him] under [the] left wing." The airplane subsequently impacted a runway sign and came to rest in the grass adjacent to the runway. The probable cause was found to be the pilot's inadequate compensation for wind conditions, and his inadequate recovery from the bounced landing.

== See also ==
- List of airports in Michigan
