= Saginaw High School =

American public high school

Location
- 3100 Webber St. Saginaw, Michigan; Saginaw, Saginaw County, Michigan 48601; United States; 43.4064°N 83.926°W

Information
- Type: Public
- Established: 1865
- Status: closed permanently
- Closed: 2024
- School district: Saginaw Public Schools
- Superintendent: Ramont M. Roberts
- CEEB code: 233310
- NCES School ID: 263039006677
- Principal: Eric Gordon
- Teaching staff: 27.16 (2022–23)
- Grades: 9–12
- Gender: Co-ed
- Enrollment: 405 (2022–23)
- Student to teacher ratio: 14.91 (2022–23)
- Language: English
- Campus: Urban
- Colors: Black & Gold
- Athletics conference: Saginaw Valley League, MHSAA
- Mascot: Trojans
- Rival: Arthur Hill High School
- Accreditation: North Central Association
- USNWR ranking: Unranked
- Class/Div: Class A/Division 1
- Website: SHS Homepage

Student assessments
- 2021–22 school year Change vs. prior year

M-STEP 11th grade proficiency rates (Science / Social Studies)
- Advanced %: ≤5 / ≤5
- Proficient %: ≤5 / ≤5
- PR. Proficient %: – / –
- Not Proficient %: – / –

Average test scores
- SAT Total: 755.9 (▼ −15.1)

Saginaw High School (formerly part of the Saginaw City School District) was a high school located in Saginaw, Michigan, USA. The student enrollment was 405 at time of closing.

== History ==
The school was established in 1865 as East Side High School. Alice Freeman Palmer, who later became President of Wellesley College, was principal of the school from 1877 to 1879.

In early 2014, a proposal suggested closing the school due to financial issues, although this would not go through. In fall 2024, Saginaw High's student body (along with that of nearby Arthur Hill High School) was transferred to the newly constructed Saginaw United High School.

The Saginaw High building is scheduled to see use as a middle school beginning in 2025.

== Academics ==
Saginaw High School was recognized by the North Central Association of Colleges and Schools as an accredited public high school.

== Demographics ==
Saginaw High School Profile (2013–14)

Grade	Students
9	214
10	155
11	126
12	98
Ungraded	0
TOTAL	593

Male	Female
49.7%	50.3%

Enrollment	% of total
Total Minority	99.5%
American Indian/Alaskan Native	0%
Asian/Pacific Islander	0.1%
Black	95.1%
Hispanic	3.5%
White	0.5%
Two or More Races	0%

== Athletics ==
Saginaw High won the Michigan Division 2 football state championship in 1999. The program has endured rough times lately. The program has produced NFL players such as Terry McDaniel, LaMarr Woodley, Charles Rogers, Roy Manning, and Charleston Hughes.This team was coached by Don Durrett.

Saginaw High has won multiple state championships in basketball. Their most recent state championship victory came in 2012 with a 54-42 win over the Rockford Rams capping a 26-2 season. In 2007, Saginaw Trojans defeated the Detroit Redford Huskies to claim the Class A state championship, the first of back to back state championship teams led by current NBA player, Draymond Green. The Trojans then repeated in 2008, beating the Detroit Pershing Doughboys, to capture another Class A state championship title. Saginaw has also won championships in 1942, 1962, and 1996.

Saginaw High has produced NBA players such as Draymond Green, Darvin Ham, and Anthony Roberson.

Saginaw High girls' basketball won the state championship in 1986. Alumni include former Michigan State University basketball player Annette Babers and former Howard University Kayette Jones.

=== Fall sports ===
- Football
- Volleyball
- Boys tennis

=== Winter sports ===
- Basketball (boys and girls)
- Bowling (boys and girls)
- Wrestling

=== Spring sports ===
- Baseball
- Softball
- Track & field (boys and girls)
- Girls soccer

=== Football ===
- Boys Football 1999 – Division 2 State Championship
- Boys Football 1942 – Class A State Championship
- Boys Football 1907 – Mythical Class A State Championship

=== Boys basketball ===
- 1941 Class A State Runner-Up
- 1942 Class A State Championship
- 1962 Class A State Championship
- 1973 Class A State Runner-Up
- 1976 Class A State Runner-Up
- 1990 Class A State Runner-Up
- 1996 Class A State Championship
- 2007 Class A State Championship
- 2008 Class A State Championship
- 2012 Class A State Championship

=== Boys Track ===
- 1933 Class A State Runner-up
- 1935 Class A State Championship
- 1937 Class A State Runner-up
- 1938 Class A State Championship
- 1945 Class A State Championship
- 1946 Class A State Championship
- 1947 Class A State Championship
- 1948 Class A State Championship
- 1949 Class A State Championship
- 1952 Class A State Championship
- 1954 Class A State Championship
- 1972 Class A State Runner-up
- 1973 Class A State Championship

=== Girls basketball ===
- 1986 Class A State State Championship
- 1987 Class A State Runner-Up

== Notable alumni ==
- Bob Buhl, former MLB player (Milwaukee Braves, Chicago Cubs, Philadelphia Phillies)
- Draymond Green, NBA player for the Golden State Warriors
- Darvin Ham, played for the Detroit Pistons.
- Charleston Hughes, CFL player for the Calgary Stampeders.
- Roy Manning, former NFL player and current outside linebackers coach at Washington State University
- Terry McDaniel, former Tennessee and NFL football player
- Stacy Erwin Oakes, current State Representative, Michigan House of Representatives, 95th District.
- Calvin O'Neal, former Michigan and NFL football player.
- James Reed, former NFL defensive tackle.
- Anthony Roberson, former NBA player
- Charles Rogers, former NFL wide receiver.
- Tom Slade, former Michigan football player
- LaMarr Woodley, former NFL player for Arizona Cardinals.
- Paul Dawkins, first NBA player from Saginaw [Utah Jazz], and international basketball player [Turkey-Galatasaray].
- Reggie Jones (sprinter), world class sprinter in the 100 and 200 meter sprints.
- Archie Yelle, Major league baseball player with the Detroit Tigers.

== See also ==
- List of schools in Saginaw, Michigan
- List of high schools in Michigan
