= Hartley Outdoor Education Center =

- Location within Michigan
- Location: Saginaw County, Michigan, US
- Nearest city: St. Charles, Michigan
- Coordinates: 43°18′55″N 84°09′48″W
- Area: 300 acres (1.2 km^{2})
- Established: 1948
- Governing body: Saginaw Intermediate School District
- Website: sisd.cc/hartley/

Hartley Outdoor Education Center is a member of the Saginaw Intermediate School District located 1.5 miles (2.4 km) northwest of St. Charles, Michigan in Saginaw County. Since its opening in 1975, Hartley's 300 acres (1.2 km^{2}) have entertained and educated approximately 250,000 students and houses about 4,000 students each year. It is designed to educate elementary and middle school students, but is not limited to this and can teach high school students as well. As both a camp and a school, many students learn topics they normally wouldn't learn inside a classroom, by going through cabins, coal mines, forests, wetlands, meadows and ponds to learn about topics such as survival, pioneer living, or confidence, enjoying themselves in the process.

== History ==
The Hartley Nature Camp Corporation was created in 1948 by Peter Hartley. The camp continued until acquired by the SISD in 1969. In 1975, Hartley Outdoor Education Center opened its door. It was founded on the site of Coal Mine No. 8 and is also home to the Schroeder Log Cabin.

== Classes ==
Students are the given opportunities to participate in their classes by making things such as apple cider, candles, funnel cake, and necklaces or learn by seeing wigwams, longhouses, coal mines, reptiles, other animals, or other entities.

The classes include:

- Archeology Dig
- Beaver Creek Watershed Study
- Bird Study
- Mine No. 8
- Confidence Course
- Discovering Fossils
- Ecology in Action
- Forest Investigation
- Fossils and Coal Mine
- Lumberjack Lore
- Michigan Mammals
- Native American Heritage
- Outdoor Photography
- Outdoor Survival
- Pioneer Living
- Wetland Lab

Staff from the center can also bring special classes to schools upon request.
