= Bridgeport-Spaulding Community School District =

School district in Michigan

Address
- 4691 Bearcat Blvd. Brigeport, Saginaw, Michigan; United States
- Coordinates: 43.35687°N 83.86902°W

District information
- Type: Public
- Motto: No Barriers, Just Possibilities
- Grades: Pre-kindergarten through 12
- Superintendent: Mark A. Whelton
- Schools: Elementary 2 Middle 1 High 1
- Budget: US$33,797,000 expenditures (2022-2023)
- NCES District ID: 2606780

Students and staff
- Students: 1,477 (2024-2025)
- Teachers: 73.9 FTE (2024-2025)
- Staff: 148.78 (2024-2025)
- Student–teacher ratio: 19.99 (2024-2025)
- Athletic conference: Tri-Valley Conference
- District mascot: Bearcats
- Colors: Red, Gold, and White

Other information
- Intermediate school district: Saginaw Intermediate School District
- Website: https://www.gobearcats.net

The Bridgeport-Spaulding Community School District is a school district in Saginaw County, Michigan. It is a part of the Saginaw Intermediate School District and serves the town of Bridgeport and portions of Buena Vista, Buena Vista Township, and Spaulding Township.

== History ==
The bond issue to build Bridgeport High School passed in 1959. The architect was Frederick E. Wigen. Construction began in fall 1960 and the school partially opened in 1961 and was dedicated on October 21, 1962. When opened, the school used closed-circuit television to broadcast lectures to classrooms.

In 2013 the Buena Vista School District closed. The Bridgeport-Spaulding Community School District took property of Buena Vista west of Airport and south of Hess as well as areas south of East Holland Road between Airport and Towerline. 135 ex-Buena Vista students were expected to go to Bridgeport-Spaulding. Ultimately 135 former Buena Vista students entered Bridgeport-Spaulding schools in fall 2013.

== Schools ==
Schools in Bridgeport
School	Address	Enrollment 2023-2024	Notes
Brigeport High	4691 Bearcat Blvd., Brigeport	506	Grades 9-12
Thomas White Elementary	3650 Southfield Dr., Saginaw	191	PreK-1
Martin G. Atkins School	3675 Southfield Dr., Saginaw	388	Grades 2-8
Bridgeport Middle School	3675 Southfield Dr., Saginaw	368	Grades 6-8, housed within Atkins School
