= Buena Vista Charter Township, Michigan =

Buena Vista Township, Michigan
- Charter township
- Buena Vista Charter Township
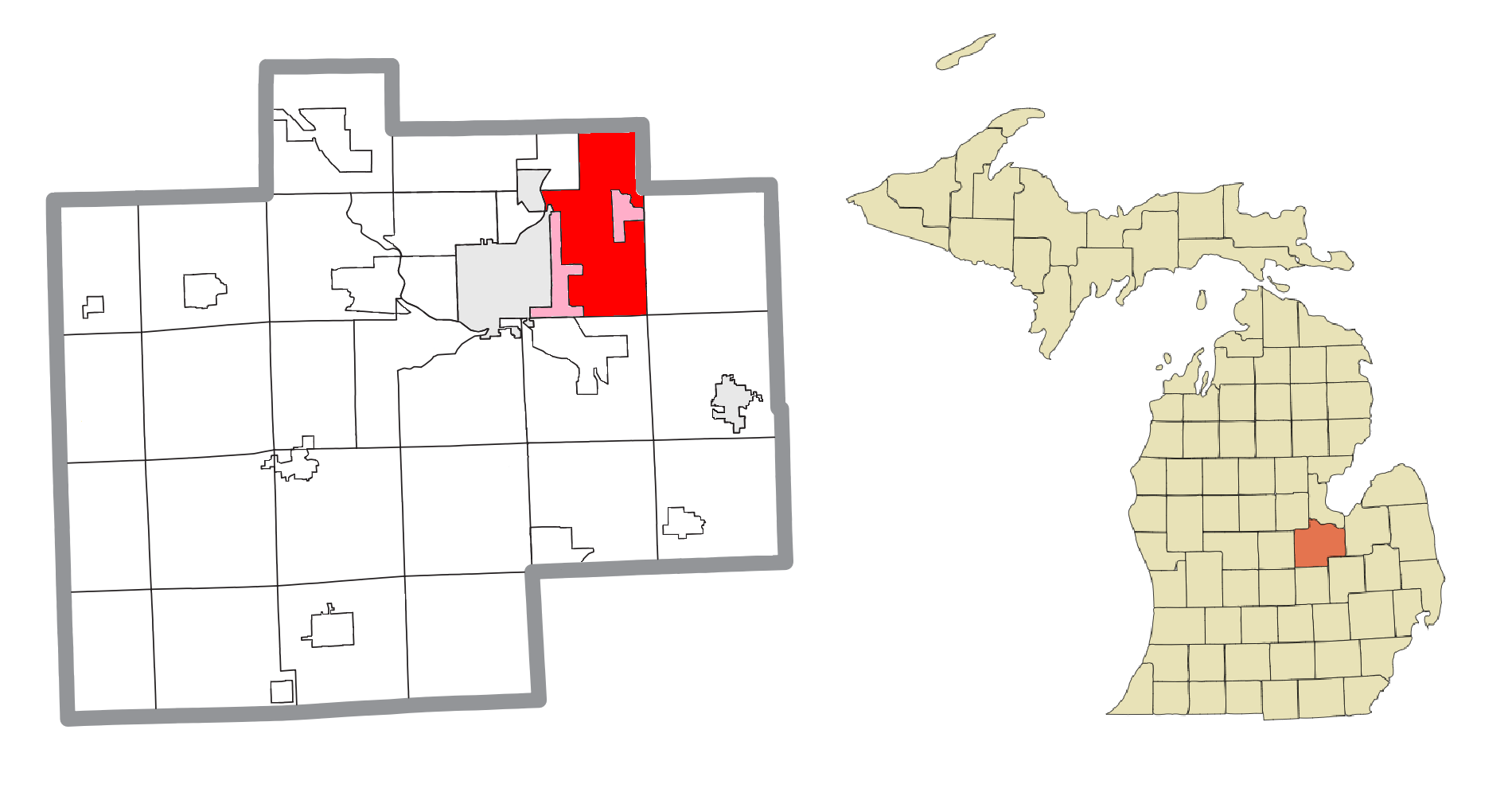
- Location within Saginaw County (red) and the administered communities of Buena Vista and Robin Glen–Indiantown (pink)

- Location within the state of Michigan
- Coordinates: 43°25′56″N 83°52′59″W
- Country: United States
- State: Michigan
- County: Saginaw
- Established: 1849

Government
  - Type: Board–manager
  - Supervisor: Christina L. Dillard
  - Superintendent: Torrie McAfee

Area
  - Total: 36.2 sq mi (93.8 km^{2})
  - Land: 36.0 sq mi (93.2 km^{2})
  - Water: 0.23 sq mi (0.6 km^{2})
- Elevation: 587 ft (179 m)

Population (2020)
  - Total: 7,664
  - Density: 213/sq mi (82.2/km^{2})
- Time zone: UTC-5 (Eastern (EST))
  - Summer (DST): UTC-4 (EDT)
- ZIP code(s): 48601 (Saginaw); 48708 (Bay City)
- Area code: 989
- FIPS code: 26-11560
- GNIS feature ID: 1626000
- Website: Official website

Buena Vista Charter Township is a charter township of Saginaw County in the U.S. state of Michigan. Per the 2020 census, the population was 7,664.

== History ==
This area was known to the Ojibwe as Tik-wak-baw-hawning.

== Communities ==
- Buena Vista is a census-designated place (CDP) and unincorporated community in the township.
- Crow Island is an unincorporated community in the township on Crow Island Road between M-13 and Hack Road. A post office opened February 6, 1882, and closed March 13, 1883. The office was reestablished May 3, 1883, until closing on March 15, 1895.
- Fifield was a settlement with a railroad station on the Pere Marquette Railroad. It was centered around a sawmill and had a post office from 1898 until 1900.
- Robin Glen-Indiantown is a census-designated place (CDP) in the township containing the unincorporated community of Indiantown.

== Geography ==
According to the United States Census Bureau, the township has a total area of 36.2 square miles (94 km^{2}), of which 36.0 square miles (93 km^{2}) is land and 0.2 square miles (0.52 km^{2}) (0.63%) is water.

== Demographics ==
Historical population
Census	Pop.	Note	%±
2000	10,318		—
2010	8,676		−15.9%
2020	7,664		−11.7%
U.S. Decennial Census; 2010 2020

=== Racial and ethnic composition ===
Buena Vista Charter Township, Michigan – Racial and ethnic composition Note: the US Census treats Hispanic/Latino as an ethnic category. This table excludes Latinos from the racial categories and assigns them to a separate category. Hispanics/Latinos may be of any race.
Race / Ethnicity (NH = Non-Hispanic)	Pop 2000	Pop 2010	Pop 2020	% 2000	% 2010	% 2020
White alone (NH)	3,484	2,407	2,180	33.77%	27.74%	28.44%
Black or African American alone (NH)	5,678	5,206	4,440	55.03%	60.00%	57.93%
Native American or Alaska Native alone (NH)	34	33	38	0.33%	0.38%	0.50%
Asian alone (NH)	13	25	13	0.13%	0.29%	0.17%
Native Hawaiian or Pacific Islander alone (NH)	1	1	0	0.01%	0.01%	0.00%
Other race alone (NH)	6	6	28	0.06%	0.07%	0.37%
Mixed race or Multiracial (NH)	162	195	304	1.57%	2.25%	3.97%
Hispanic or Latino (any race)	940	803	661	9.11%	9.26%	8.62%
Total	10,318	8,676	7,664	100.00%	100.00%	100.00%

=== 2000 Census ===
As of the census of 2000, there were 10,318 people, 3,870 households, and 2,743 families residing in the township. The population density was 286.7 inhabitants per square mile (110.7/km^{2}). There were 4,211 housing units at an average density of 117.0 per square mile (45.2/km^{2}). The racial makeup of the township was 37.00% White, 55.57% African American, 0.46% Native American, 0.13% Asian, 0.01% Pacific Islander, 4.30% from other races, and 2.53% from two or more races. Hispanic or Latino of any race were 9.11% of the population.

There were 3,870 households, out of which 35.1% had children under the age of 18 living with them, 39.2% were married couples living together, 27.2% had a female householder with no husband present, and 29.1% were non-families. 24.6% of all households were made up of individuals, and 8.6% had someone living alone who was 65 years of age or older. The average household size was 2.61 and the average family size was 3.10.

In the township the population was spread out, with 30.3% under the age of 18, 8.7% from 18 to 24, 26.9% from 25 to 44, 21.8% from 45 to 64, and 12.3% who were 65 years of age or older. The median age was 33 years. For every 100 females, there were 92.4 males. For every 100 females age 18 and over, there were 84.8 males.

The median income for a household in the township was $30,339, and the median income for a family was $32,851. Males had a median income of $30,625 versus $22,775 for females. The per capita income for the township was $15,636. About 19.7% of families and 20.4% of the population were below the poverty line, including 31.6% of those under age 18 and 11.4% of those age 65 or over.

== Government ==
The township is governed under a modified Council–manager government where the township manager only takes over most of the duties of the supervisor.

== Transportation ==
Saginaw County H.W. Browne Airport is in the township.

== Education ==
School districts with portions of the township include Saginaw City School District, New Lothrop Area Public Schools, Bay City School District, Bridgeport-Spaulding Community School District, and Frankenmuth School District.

On July 30, 2013, the Saginaw Intermediate School District Board of Trustees officially dissolved Buena Vista School District with its area split up between three other districts: Bridgeport-Spaulding (135 students), Saginaw City (260) and Frankenmuth. Prior to the rezoning, most of the township was in the Buena Vista SD. Pieces were in the New Lothrop district and the Bay City district.
