= Heritage High School (Saginaw, Michigan) =

Location
- 3465 North Center Road; Saginaw Township, Michigan 48603; United States; 43°27′22″N 84°00′57″W

Information
- School type: Public, high school
- Established: 1988; 38 years ago
- School district: Saginaw Township Community Schools
- Superintendent: Bruce Martin
- CEEB code: 233286
- NCES School ID: 263045006701
- Principal: Brian Blaine
- Teaching staff: 67.15 (FTE)
- Grades: 9 to 12
- Gender: Co-ed
- Enrollment: 1,313 (2024–2025)
- Student to teacher ratio: 19.55
- Colors: Navy Blue; Kelly Green
- Athletics conference: Saginaw Valley League
- Nickname: Hawks
- Accreditation: North Central Association
- Yearbook: The Legacy
- Website: www.stcs.org/o/hehs

Heritage High School is the primary high school in the Saginaw Township Community Schools district. Heritage is located on North Center Road in Saginaw Charter Township, Michigan and is recognized as an Advanced Placement school.

== History ==
Heritage was the product of a merger between Douglas MacArthur High School (which now houses White Pine Middle School) and Dwight D. Eisenhower High School (which now houses Heritage) in 1988, after Eisenhower High School was severely damaged in a 1987 arson. Selecting one color from each of its parent schools, Heritage's official colors are Navy Blue and Kelly Green, and its school mascot is the hawk.

== Academics ==
Student assessments
- 2021–22 school year Change vs. prior year

M-STEP 11th grade proficiency rates (Science / Social Studies)
- Advanced %: 15.7 / 10.8
- Proficient %: 25.0 / 25.4
- PR. Proficient %: 14.9 / 45.5
- Not Proficient %: 44.4 / 18.3

Average test scores
- SAT Total: 975.3 (▼ −3.7)

Heritage offers numerous Advanced Placement courses, and from the 2006–2007 school year to 2021, the school participated in the International Baccalaureate program.

Heritage also has an Academic Quiz Bowl team where students compete in local tournaments and then advance onto state tournaments. Heritage also participates in the local Science Olympiad.

== Demographics ==
The demographic breakdown of the 1,553 students enrolled in 2015-16 was:

- Male - 50.0%
- Female - 50.0%
- Native American/Alaskan - 0.3%
- Asian/Pacific islanders - 5.2%
- Black - 14.4%
- Hispanic - 10.6%
- White - 68.1%
- Multiracial - 1.4%

30.3% of the students were eligible for free or reduced-cost lunch. The 2019 graduation rate was 93.4%.

== Athletics ==
The Heritage High School Hawks compete in the Saginaw Valley League. The school colors are kelly green and navy blue. The following MHSAA sanctioned sports are offered:

- Baseball (boys)
- Basketball (girls and boys)
  - Girls state championship - 2002, 2018, 2019
- Bowling (girls and boys)
- Competitive cheer (girls)
- Cross country (boys and girls)
- Football (boys)
- Golf (boys and girls)
- Ice hockey (boys)
- Lacrosse (boys and girls)
- Sideline Cheer
- Skiing (boys and girls)
- Soccer (boys and girls)
  - Girls state championship - 2002
- Softball (girls)
- Swimming and diving (boys and girls)
- Tennis (boys and girls)
- Track and field (boys and girls)
  - Boys state championship - 2001
- Volleyball (girls)
- Wrestling (boys)
- Varsity and JV PomPon

== Notable alumni ==
- Brian Cole II – American gridiron football player (born 1997)
- Siena Liggins – American pop musician (born 1994)
- Stuart Schweigert – American football player and coach (born 1981)
- Spencer Schwellenbach – American baseball player (born 2000)
