= Hemlock Public School District =

School district in Michigan, United States

Address
- 733 N. Hemlock Road, Suite 100 Hemlock, Saginaw County, Michigan, 48626; United States
- Coordinates: 43.41750°N 84.23090°W

District information
- Grades: Pre-Kindergarten-12
- Established: 1863
- Superintendent: Donald Killingbeck
- Schools: 5
- Budget: $20,487,000 2022-2023 expenditures
- NCES District ID: 2618180

Students and staff
- Students: 1,239 (2024-2025)
- Teachers: 70.55 (on an FTE basis) (2024-2025)
- Staff: 149.95 FTE (2024-2025)
- Student–teacher ratio: 17.56 (2024-2025)
- Athletic conference: Tri-Valley Conference
- District mascot: Huskies
- Colors: Navy and White

Other information
- Intermediate school district: Saginaw Intermediate School District
- Website: www.hemlock.k12.mi.us

Hemlock Public School District is a public school district in Saginaw County, Michigan. It serves Hemlock, Richland Township, and parts of the townships of Fremont, Swan Creek, and Thomas. It also serves part of Ingersoll Township in Midland County.

The district was created in 1863 and is governed by a seven-member publicly elected board of education.

== History ==
Following its establishment in 1863, the district built a succession of schoolhouses. The schoolhouse built around 1894 was used as a high school until a new high school was built in 1917.

A 1949 newspaper article described crowded conditions in the district, and stated that a rural schoolhouse had been moved into town for added space: "At present the Hemlock Methodist Church house is used for kindergarten and Grades 1 and 2. Approximately 90 children are crowded into two rooms. Shop classes are taught at Smith School, two miles west of Hemlock. The third grade and part of the fourth grade meet in Fordney School, which was moved into Hemlock last summer. In the main school building, one high school class is conducted in the hall for lack of space." In April 1949, voters approved a $120,000 bond issue to build Hemlock Elementary. Ineligible to vote on the bond issue but wanting to contribute, two immigrant brothers who operated a farm south of Hemlock donated $1,000 to the district (about $13,600 in 2025 dollars) for construction costs.

The 1953 high school yearbook shows an illustration of the 1917 high school building, at the northwest corner of Hemlock Road and Wilson Street, in relation to Hemlock Elementary. Despite the new building additions illustrated, the district remained lacking for space in 1958. It was operating two elementary schools (Roosevelt and Hemlock) and the 1917 high school was still in use for upper grades. Second grade met in a church and the kindergarten met in the post office.

Relieving the crisis, the current high school opened in January 1959. The building's architect was H.E. Beyster and Associates. Students were reassigned to district buildings and the Roosevelt school was closed. Hemlock Middle School was built in 1970. Ling Elementary, built in 1975, is named after Dr. Kenneth Ling, a physician and long-serving school board member who died in 1972.

Voters passed a $41.9 million bond issue in 2022 to renew and improve district facilities.

== Schools ==
Schools in Hemlock Public School District
School	Address	Notes
Hemlock High School	733 N. Hemlock Rd., Hemlock	Grades 9-12. Built 1959.
Hemlock Middle School	525 N Maple, Hemlock	Grades 5-8. Built 1970.
Ling Elementary	835 N Pine St., Hemlock	Grades 1-4. Built 1975.
Hemlock Elementary / Early Childhood Center	200 Wilson St., Hemlock	Grades PreK-K. Built 1949.
Hemlock Virtual	733 N. Hemlock Rd., Hemlock	Grades 7-12. Online/alternative high school
