= Martha Longstreet =

American physician (1870–1953)

- Born: April 27, 1870; Erie, Pennsylvania, United States
- Died: February 26, 1953 (aged 82); Saginaw, Michigan, United States
- Education: University of Illinois
- Occupations: General practitioner, pediatrician
- Honors: Michigan Women's Hall of Fame

Martha Longstreet (April 27, 1870 – February 26, 1953) was an American general practitioner and pediatrician from Saginaw, Michigan. Known for her work as a physician in Saginaw for 45 years, she was inducted into the Michigan Women's Hall of Fame in 1984. Longstreet was known as the "children's doctor" and founded a number of community institutions, particularly for children, women, and senior citizens. She has been called a "second mother to untold hundreds of Saginaw children and their children's children".

== Biography ==
She was born in Erie, Pennsylvania, and moved to Unionville, Michigan, at a young age. After her father's death, her mother, Mary, married William Watson Will, a Methodist minister, in 1887. She had two siblings – a sister, Isabelle Eyestone, who was a missionary to China, and a brother, William L. Longstreet.

Longstreet had debilitating curvature of the spine; however, it did not stop her from pursuing medicine. She began her medical studies in Saginaw, graduating in 1893 from the nurses' program at Bliss Deaconess Hospital, a Methodist hospital which later became part of Saginaw General Hospital. To further her education, Longstreet went to New York to become a nursing supervisor but returned to the Midwest after being let go when her spinal condition was discovered. Enrolling instead at the University of Illinois Medical School, Longstreet graduated with honors in 1904. She was among the 19 women in a class otherwise composed of 200 men.

She then went back to Saginaw and in her first year as a general practitioner, made house calls traveling by streetcar. Longstreet then began to take a phaeton pulled by her horse, Maude, around town, and became the first woman in town with a car. While making house calls in the community, she kept her own detailed records on patients' living situations and often treated poor families free of charge, anonymously providing them with care packages. "It also was said nobody ever learned all there was to know about Dr. Martha’s devious bookkeeping system. Sometimes it had to do with how long it would take that young couple to get back on their feet after all their sickness. Or whether her bill should be sent in the summer, or later, or whether it went at all."

Longstreet soon became the attending physician at the Women's Hospital of Saginaw, working tirelessly and at times "fighting epidemics almost single-handed."

In 1921, Longstreet decided to focus her practice on pediatrics, receiving further education at Presbyterian Hospital in New York and Harvard University. She preferred to refer to herself with the term children's doctor rather than pediatrician. Longstreet found a special connection with children and "could win a child's confidence where other doctors failed." She spoke to them on their level, talking about their interests and bringing pieces of candy as well. A colleague described her work, saying "She speaks to children as if she had her arms around them."

She volunteered at the Children's Home of Saginaw for many years.

She served on committees of the Saginaw County Medical Association, Michigan Medical Association, and American Medical Association. Longstreet was a member of the board of directors of the Saginaw Welfare League and vice president of the First Ward Community Service. She helped found several social organizations, including the Saginaw YWCA, a senior citizens' home and girls' home, and the local Council of Social Agencies.

Longstreet retired in 1949 at 78 years of age due to poor vision. Several years later, in 1953, she died in Saginaw, leaving little behind in terms of an estate. After her death, the Detroit Free Press noted that "[H]er many kind works of mercy are still the talk of the city."

== Achievements and legacy ==
The Children's Home of Saginaw named its nursery after her in 1937 after her many years of work there. The same year, she received an honorable mention for Michigan's Most Outstanding Woman by the Inter-Club Council of Business Women. In 1946, the Saginaw County Medical Society held an event in honor of her years of service to the community.

She was the first woman to be made an honorary director of the Saginaw Chamber of Commerce and was named its Outstanding Citizen of the Year.

Longstreet was inducted into the Michigan Women's Hall of Fame in 1984.

Martha Longstreet Elementary School in Saginaw opened in the 1950s and closed in 2003.
