= Valley Lutheran High School (Michigan) =

Missouri Synod Lutheran high school in Saginaw, Michigan

Location
- 3560 McCarty Road; Saginaw Charter Township, Michigan 48603; United States; 43°28′4″N 83°59′12″W

Information
- Type: Parochial High School
- Denomination: Lutheran Church–Missouri Synod
- Status: Open
- CEEB code: 233311
- NCES School ID: 00642037
- Principal: Al Kaul (Executive Director)
- Teaching staff: 15.5 (2021-22)
- Grades: 9 to 12
- Gender: Co-ed
- Enrollment: 288 (2022-23)
- Student to teacher ratio: 14.1 (2021-22)
- Colors: Blue and gold
- Athletics conference: Tri-Valley Conference
- Team name: Chargers
- Accreditation: Cognia MANS NLSA
- Intermediate school district: Saginaw Intermediate School District
- Website: www.vlhs.com

Valley Lutheran High School is a private parochial school located in Saginaw Charter Township, Michigan. The school is affiliated with the Lutheran Church–Missouri Synod. It is governed by local churches within the synod. It was founded in 1977.

== Sports ==
Valley Lutheran is a class "C" school. It did not have an American football team until the mid-1990s because of budget restrictions. As a result, the school was always well known for its soccer team and the annual homecoming dance was held in conjunction with a soccer match instead of the more traditional American football game.

The following sports are offered:

=== Fall sports ===
- Men's cross country
- Women's cross country
- American football
- Women's golf
- Men's soccer
- Volleyball

=== Winter sports ===
- Women's basketball
- Men's basketball
- Men's bowling
- Women's bowling
- Men's ice hockey
- Pompon (competitive)
- Men's wrestling

=== Spring sports ===
- Men's baseball
- Women's softball
- Men's golf
- Men's soccer
- Men's track & field
- Women's track & field

Club Sports
Sport	Season
Equestrian	Fall & Summer
Women's ice hockey	Winter
Trap shooting	Fall & Spring
Ultimate frisbee	Spring

== The "Carpet Dome" ==
Before 1995, the school's basketball court was carpeted and students dubbed the gymnasium the carpet dome. When the school was constructed, a decision had been made to cover the gymnasium in carpet for financial reasons as well as for noise reduction. Because of the school's religious background, there are daily chapel assemblies and it was thought that a carpet would be quieter than wooden flooring. In 1995, the carpeted basketball court was replaced with more traditional wooden flooring. The Saginaw News frequently reported that the carpeted floor gave the home team a ten-point advantage and many carpet burns.

== Notable alumni ==
- Paul Walter Hauser (2004), actor
