= Saginaw United High School =

Coordinates: 43.4327°N 83.9449°W

Location
- 1903 N. Niagara St; Saginaw, Michigan 48602; United States

Information
- School type: Public
- Opened: 2024
- School district: Saginaw Public Schools
- Principal: Eric Gordon
- Assistant Principal: Arshen Baldwin
- Assistant Principal: Derrick Wyatt
- Grades: 9-12
- Enrollment: ~1,100 students
- Colors: Black and silver
- Athletics conference: Saginaw Valley League
- Mascot: Phoenix
- Website: https://www.spsd.net/o/suhs

Saginaw United High School is a high school in Saginaw, Michigan.

Upon opening in 2024, it absorbed the student bodies of the former Arthur Hill High School and Saginaw High School, both of which would be repurposed.

== History ==
Due to the post-industrial enrollment of Arthur Hill High School and Saginaw High School, a proposal was brought forth in 2020 to consolidate the student bodies of both in one newer, more modern building. This plan was approved, and ground was broken on the new school in 2022. Construction of the primary part of the $85 million district-wide project was finished in 2024, after which the school began accepting students for its inaugural 2024-25 school year. Additional facilities to be used for athletics are still under construction.

== School building ==
The five-floor building encompasses a total of 212,000 square feet. Each floor of the school is dedicated to a grade level, with one floor remaining for general school facilities.
