= Freeland Community School District =

School district in Michigan

Address
- 710 Powley Drive Freeland, Saginaw County, Michigan, 48623; United States
- Coordinates: 43.51820°N 84.11535°W

District information
- Type: Public
- Motto: Preparing Students for the Demands & Opportunities of the 21st Century.
- Grades: Pre-Kindergarten-12
- President: Kristin Anderson
- Vice-president: Jeffrey Kipfmiller
- Superintendent: Marcus Hillborg
- Schools: 3
- Budget: $28,645,000 2022-2023 expenditures
- NCES District ID: 2615060

Students and staff
- Students: 2,016 (2024-2025)
- Teachers: 103.63 (on an FTE basis) (2024-2025)
- Staff: 219.43 FTE (2024-2025)
- Student–teacher ratio: 19.45 (2024-2025)
- Athletic conference: Tri-Valley Conference
- District mascot: Falcons
- Colors: Green and White

Other information
- Intermediate school district: Saginaw Intermediate School District
- Website: www.freelandschools.net

Freeland Community School District is a school district headquartered in Freeland, Michigan in northwest Saginaw County. It is a part of the Saginaw Intermediate School District and serves the Freeland area, including Tittabawassee Township, the northern portion of Thomas Township, and the westernmost sections of Kochville Township. Its schools include Freeland Learning Center, Freeland Elementary School, Freeland Middle School, and Freeland High School.

== Freeland Learning Center ==
Freeland Learning Center is the oldest school building in the district, built in 1959, and expanded since then. As of 2021–2022 school year, the Learning Center houses Young 5's, Kindergarten, and 1st grade classes.

The Learning Center also used to hold 2nd grade, until 2017. The school times are 8:45-3:50.

== Freeland Elementary School ==
Freeland Elementary School also houses the District administration office. As of the 2021–2022 school year, the Elementary school houses students in 2nd-5th grade on the Elementary schedule as well as 6th grade class that operates on the Middle School schedule.

== Freeland Middle School/ Freeland High School ==
Freeland Middle School houses grades 7th and 8th. Freeland High school houses grades 9th-12th. The high school campus includes a football stadium, a soccer stadium, and a 500-person auditorium. The facilities are shared with the Middle School which is collocated on the Webster Road campus.
