= Carrollton Public Schools =

School district in Michigan

Address
- 3211 Carla Dr. Saginaw, Midland County, Michigan, 48604; United States

District information
- Grades: Pre-Kindergarten-12
- Superintendent: Tiffany Petersen
- Schools: 5
- Budget: $31,510,000 2022-2023 expenditures
- NCES District ID: 2608070

Students and staff
- Students: 1,576 (2024-2025)
- Teachers: 103.89 (on an FTE basis) (2024-2025)
- Staff: 289.49 FTE (2024-2025)
- Student–teacher ratio: 15.17 (2024-2025)
- Athletic conference: Tri-Valley Conference
- District mascot: Cavaliers
- Colors: Red, Black, and White

Other information
- Intermediate school district: Saginaw Intermediate School District
- Website: www.carrolltonpublicschools.org

Carrollton Public Schools is a public school district in Saginaw County, Michigan. It serves Carrollton Township.

== History ==
The roots of Carrollton Public Schools lie in the Carrollton Union School of the township's School District No. 1, a union school district that existed at least as far back as 1888, when it was mentioned in the Saginaw News. Mershon School, part of the township's School District No. 2, was built in 1923. A new Union School building was built in 1940 and funded by the Public Works Administration. The two districts merged in 1953.

A crisis arose in 1929 when two boys, ages seven and nine, took a bottle of poisonous disinfectant they had found in the Sixth Street dump and poured it down the well of Union School. Two children became violently sick before the contamination was discovered and use of the well was suspended.

In the 1952-1953 school year, the Mershon School (with four rooms) and Union School (with ten rooms) were overcrowded. Union School was so overcrowded that the auditorium was partitioned into classrooms and held grades five through eight, with fourth grade using the stage. Kindergarteners missed one week of school while the community debated where to house them. As of 1953, a new junior high building was being planned that would relieve overcrowding. Construction began in September 1954 and completion was planned for 1955.

Carrollton High School was dedicated in May 1962. Prior to its opening, high school students in the district attended high schools in Saginaw.

== Schools ==
Schools in the district, except Omni High School, share a campus along Carla Drive in Carrollton Township.

Schools in Carrollton Public Schools district
School	Address	Notes
Carrollton High School	1235 Mapleridge Rd., Saginaw	Grades 9–12. Built 1962.
Carrollton Middle School	3211 Carla Dr., Saginaw	Grades 6–8.
Carrollton Elementary	3211 Carla Dr., Saginaw	Grades PreK–5. Shares a building with Carrollton Middle School.
Omni High School	479 Shattuck Rd., Saginaw	Alternative high school located in former St. Josaphat's Home and School.
Carrollton Learning Centers	3160 Carla Dr., Carrollton	
