= Chesaning Union Schools =

School district in Michigan, US

Address
- 850 North 4th Street Chesaning, Saginaw County, Michigan, 48616; United States
- Coordinates: 43.19328°N 84.12669°W

District information
- Grades: Pre-Kindergarten-12
- President: Martin Maier
- Superintendent: Mike McGough
- Schools: 3
- Budget: $20,185,000 2022-2023 expenditures
- NCES District ID: 2609150

Students and staff
- Students: 1,386 (2024-2025)
- Teachers: 82.3 (on an FTE basis) (2024-2025)
- Staff: 226.37 FTE (2024-2025)
- Student–teacher ratio: 16.84 (2024-2025)
- Athletic conference: Mid-Michigan Activities Conference
- District mascot: Indians
- Colors: Orange and Black

Other information
- Intermediate school district: Saginaw Intermediate School District
- Website: www.chesaningschools.net

Chesaning Union Schools is a public school district in Saginaw County, Michigan. It serves Chesaning, Oakley, Albee and Brady townships, and parts of the townships of Brady, Brant, Chapin, Chesaning, Maple Grove, and St. Charles. It also serves parts of Hazelton Township, New Haven Township and Rush Township in Shiawassee County.

== History ==
In April 1956, Chesaning's school district began to seek mergers with the independent small school districts in outlying areas for the purposes of building a new high school. By 1957, enrollment in the school district had nearly doubled through consolidation and a bond issue passed that December to build the new high school.

The new high school opened in fall 1959 and was dedicated on December 6, 1959. The previous high school became a school for grades 6-8. As of October 1969, the district had 3,448 students and five elementary schools: Albee, Big Rock, Brady, Oakley and Line Street.

Big Rock Elementary opened in fall 1968. Chesaning Middle School, with a pool and a 400-seat auditorium, opened in 1976.

== Schools ==
Schools in Chesaning Union Schools district
School	Address	Notes
Chesaning Union High School	850 N. Fourth Street, Chesaning	Grades 9-12. Built 1959.
Chesaning Middle School	431 N. Fourth Street, Chesaning	Grades 4-8
Big Rock Elementary	920 E. Broad Street, Chesaning	Grades PreK-3
