= Bridgeport High School (Michigan) =

Public high school in Bridgeport, Michigan

Location
- 4691 Bearcat Boulevard; Bridgeport, Michigan 48722; United States; 43°21′19″N 83°52′11″W

Information
- School type: Public, High school
- Motto: Welcome To Bearcat Country
- Established: 1961
- School district: Bridgeport-Spaulding Community School District
- Superintendent: Carol Selby
- CEEB code: 230387
- NCES School ID: 260678004274
- Principal: John LaGalo
- Teaching staff: 22.15 (on a FTE basis)
- Grades: 9 to 12
- Gender: Co-ed
- Enrollment: 506 (2023-2024)
- Student to teacher ratio: 22.84
- Colors: Red, Gold, and White
- Athletics conference: Tri-Valley Conference
- Nickname: Bearcats
- Accreditation: North Central Association
- Website: www.gobearcats.net/o/bhs

Bridgeport High School is public institution located at 4961 Bearcat Blvd. in Bridgeport, Michigan. Bridgeport's mascot is a bearcat, and its colors are yellow and red.
