= Saginaw Township Community Schools =

School district in Michigan

Address
- 3465 North Center Road Saginaw, Saginaw County, Michigan, 48603; United States
- Coordinates: 43.45616°N 84.01720°W

District information
- Motto: Every Student Every Day
- Grades: PreKindergarten–12
- President: Janice L. Collison
- Vice-president: Marianne C. Bird
- Superintendent: Jamie Kraatz
- Schools: 8
- Budget: $67,543,000 2022–2023 expenditures
- NCES District ID: 2630450

Students and staff
- Students: 4,548 (2024–2025)
- Teachers: 255.99 (on an FTE basis) (2024–2025)
- Staff: 793.96 FTE (2024–2025)
- Student–teacher ratio: 17.77 (2024–2025)
- Athletic conference: Saginaw Valley League

Other information
- Intermediate school district: Saginaw Intermediate School District
- Website: www.stcs.org

Saginaw Township Community Schools is a public school district in Saginaw County, Michigan. It serves all of Saginaw Township.

== History ==
Saginaw Township Community Schools began with the Black School, built in 1837. It was named after its unusual interior and exterior paint color. It was renamed Swarthout School in 1868 and Hemmeter School in 1893, after school board member William F. Hemmeter. It was replaced with the current Hemmeter School in 1938. Westdale Elementary and Sherwood Elementary (formerly Mackinac Middle School) were both built in 1956, with Weiss Elementary added around 1959. Mackinaw High School, then known as Plainfield Elementary, was built around 1961.

Chippewa Middle School and White Pine Middle School were both dedicated on March 5, 1961. MacArthur High School was dedicated on May 27, 1962. Douglas MacArthur gave his permission for the school to be named after him. During construction, the swimming pool building of MacArthur High School collapsed, killing a construction worker.

In fall 1970, Eisenhower High School opened. It was to be called Heritage High School until school board member George L. Olson suggested it be named for Dwight D. Eisenhower, who was "a close friend and aide to General MacArthur," he noted. After 1988, the building became once again known as Heritage High School.

Eisenhower High School was damaged in an arson fire on November 23, 1986. The building was temporarily closed and reconstructed while its students attended MacArthur High School on a split-schedule basis. By March 1987, an undamaged part of Eisenhower was retrofitted to accommodate students while the remainder continued to be reconstructed.

Around 1988, the district won a state-wide class action lawsuit against companies involved in the manufacturing of asbestos products. The need to remediate asbestos in schools in the district resulted in the closure of some buildings and expensive removal projects at others.

Heritage High School was formed in fall 1988 from the merger of Douglas MacArthur and Dwight D. Eisenhower High Schools. The former Eisenhower High School became Heritage High School. Several other changes took place in the district that year:

- Sherwood Elementary was closed and its program moved to Mackinaw Middle School, which was renamed Sherwood Elementary.
- Arrowwood Elementary was closed and its program moved to Chippewa Middle School, which was renamed Arrowwood Elementary.
- White Pine Middle School (renamed from Chippewa Middle School in 1986) moved to the former MacArthur High School, which was renamed White Pine Middle School.

The new "Heritage Hawks" branding uses one color from each of its parent schools; its official colors are now navy blue and Kelly green.

Mackinaw High School uses the building formerly known as Plainfield Elementary, which closed in 2011.

== Hemmeter Elementary ==
Hemmeter is a magnet school for gifted and talented kindergarten through 5th grade students. The academic program includes accelerated core content, as well as music, art, and physical education. To be eligible to attend, students must place in the top ten percent nationally on tests of cognitive and academic ability.

== Schools ==
Schools in Saginaw Township Community Schools district
School	Address	Notes
Heritage High School	3465 N Center Rd, Saginaw	Grades 9–12. Built 1970.
White Pine Middle School	505 North Center Road, Saginaw	Grades 6–8. Formerly MacArthur High School. Built 1962.
Arrowwood Elementary	5410 Seidel, Saginaw	Grades PreK and 3–5. Formerly White Pine Middle School. Built 1961.
Hemmeter Elementary	1890 Hemmeter, Saginaw	Magnet school for gifted and talented. Grades K-5. Built 1938.
Sherwood Elementary	3870 Shattuck, Saginaw	Grades K-2. Formerly Mackinaw Middle School. Built 1956.
Weiss Elementary	4645 Weiss Street, Saginaw	Grades 3–5. Built 1959.
Westdale Elementary	705 S. Center Rd., Saginaw	Grades K-2. Built 1956.
Mackinaw High School	2775 Shattuck, Saginaw	Alternative high school. Grades 9–12. Built 1961.
