= Saginaw Intermediate School District =

School district in Michigan, USA

Location
- Saginaw County, Michigan US-MI United States
- Coordinates: 43.41495°N 84.03920°W

District information
- Type: Public intermediate school district
- President: Richard F. Burmeister Jr.
- Vice-president: Ruth A. Coppens
- Superintendent: Kathy Stewart
- Schools: 5
- Budget: US$46,693,000 (2010-11)
- NCES District ID: 2680930

Students and staff
- Students: 1,130 (2012-13)
- Teachers: 157.55 (2012-13)
- Staff: 390.85 (2012-13)
- Student–teacher ratio: 7.17 (2012-13)

Other information
- Website: www.sisd.cc

The Saginaw Intermediate School District (SISD) is an intermediate school district in Michigan, headquartered in Saginaw.

Most of Saginaw County is served by the Saginaw Intermediate School District, which coordinates the efforts of local boards of education, but has no operating authority over schools. Local school boards in Michigan retain great autonomy over day-to-day operations.

== Composition ==
The Saginaw Intermediate School District includes many public school districts, private schools, charter schools, colleges, and facilities.

=== Public school districts ===
As of November 2013, the communities of Saginaw County are served by the following members of the Saginaw ISD:

- Birch Run Area Schools: the village of Birch Run, Taymouth Township, and all but the northeastern sections of Birch Run Township
- Bridgeport-Spaulding Community School District: Bridgeport, Spaulding townships, and a small portion of Buena Vista Township
- Carrollton Public Schools: Carrollton Township
- Chesaning Union Schools: the villages of Chesaning and Oakley, Albee and Brady townships, the southern parts of Brant and St. Charles townships, eastern Chapin Township, and small parts of Maple Grove Township
- Frankenmuth School District: the city of Frankenmuth, Frankenmuth township, northeastern Birch Run Township, southern Blumfield Township, and southeastern Buena Vista Township
- Freeland Community School District: Tittabawassee Township, the northern portion of Thomas Township, and the westernmost sections of Kochville Township
- Hemlock Public School District: Richland Township, western Thomas Township and central Fremont Township
- Merrill Community Schools: the village of Merrill, Jonesfield and Lakefield townships, most of Marion Township
- Saginaw Public School District: the cities of Saginaw and Zilwaukee, the eastern part of Kochville Township, and western part of Buena Vista Township
- Saginaw Township Community Schools: Saginaw Township
- St. Charles Community Schools: the village of St. Charles, the northern portions of Brant and St. Charles townships, and the southern portions of Fremont and Swan Creek townships
- Swan Valley School District: James Township, northeastern Swan Creek Township, eastern Thomas Township

==== Former school districts ====
- Buena Vista School District: Dissolved in 2013

=== Private schools ===
The Saginaw Intermediate School District includes several private schools, such as:.

- Bridgeport Baptist Academy
- Community Baptist Christian School
- Grace Christian School
- Michigan Lutheran Seminary
- Nouvel Catholic Central High School
- Valley Lutheran High School

=== Charter schools ===
The Saginaw Intermediate School District includes charter schools, such as the Saginaw Learn to Earn Academy.

=== Colleges ===
The Saginaw Intermediate School District includes these colleges:

- Davenport University (Saginaw campus)
- Delta College
- Saginaw Valley State University

=== Agencies and facilities ===
The Saginaw Intermediate School District includes these agencies and facilities, which are mostly run by the SISD:

- Hartley Outdoor Education Center
- Michael J McGivney School
- Saginaw County Juvenile Center
- Wolverine Secure Treatment Center / Wolverine Academy

== See also ==
- List of schools in the Saginaw Intermediate School District
- List of intermediate school districts in Michigan
