= Frankenmuth School District =

Public school district in Michigan, United States

Address
- 525 East Genesee Street Frankenmuth, Saginaw County, Michigan, 48734; United States
- Coordinates: 43.33519°N 83.73222°W

District information
- Motto: Where Effort Opens Opportunity
- Grades: Pre-Kindergarten-12
- Superintendent: JoLynn Clark
- Schools: 3
- Budget: $24,113,000 2022-2023 expenditures
- NCES District ID: 2614760

Students and staff
- Students: 1,364 (2024-2025)
- Teachers: 66.53 (on an FTE basis) (2024-2025)
- Staff: 181.76 FTE (2024-2025)
- Student–teacher ratio: 20.5 (2024-2025)
- Athletic conference: Tri-Valley Conference

Other information
- Intermediate school district: Saginaw Intermediate School District
- Website: fmuthschools.com

Frankenmuth School District is a public school district in Michigan. It serves Frankenmuth, Frankenmuth Township, and parts of the townships of Arbela, Birch Run, Blumfield, Buena Vista, Denmark, and Tuscola.

== History ==
As Frankenmuth began as a settlement for German Lutherans, its public school district is linked to early religious schools. St. Lorenz Lutheran Church had an important role in founding Frankenmuth and established its first school in 1846. Instruction was in German until around 1855, when English was used for half of each day. By 1895, there was one public school district in the Frankenmuth area (founded in 1857 as the official Frankenmuth school district) and several Lutheran school districts that were also funded by taxes. Often there was no clear delineation between private and public schools.

The State Superintendent of Public Instruction found that this arrangement violated the law and the Constitution of Michigan. In December 1901, he said that public and religious school districts must diverge through establishment of public, non-religious districts in which the schoolhouse was publicly owned. He added that instruction in publicly-funded schools must be "conducted entirely in the English language and that no church doctrines shall be taught therein."

Ernest F. "E.F." Rittmeueller, namesake of the district's middle school, was a prominent member of St. Lorenz Church. He began teaching in the area in 1914. He advocated for the consolidation of Frankenmuth's outlying school districts and also suggested the construction of St. Lorenz Central School, a brick religious school on Main Street built in the 1920s, and became its principal. In 1976, he retired from the public school board after serving there for twelve years.

Frankenmuth's early schools were wooden frame buildings. A new brick public school opened in January 1926, housing all grades in the district. At the time, the high school only went to grade ten. Outlying rural school districts consolidated with Frankenmuth's district, including eight districts around 1946.

The current Frankenmuth High School opened in 1952, received additions in 1956, and was renovated and expanded in 1972. Until 1955, juniors and seniors attended Arthur Hill High School in Saginaw. During the 1955-1956 school year, Frankenmuth juniors remained at their high school, and they were the high school's first graduating class as seniors in spring 1957.

List Elementary opened in 1961, with additions in 1966 and 1972, and Rittmueller Middle School opened in 1980. List Elementary was named after Lorenz List, treasurer of the school board since the 1920s, in 1963.

In 2001, all schools in the district received additions and renovations, including a 500-seat auditorium at the high school. Wallace J. Bronner, founder of Bronner's Christmas Wonderland, donated $1 million to help construct the auditorium.

== Schools ==
Frankenmuth's schools share a campus on East Genesee Street, east of downtown.

Schools in Frankenmuth School District
School	Address	Notes
Frankenmuth High School	525 East Genesee Street, Frankenmuth	Grades 9-12. Built 1952.
R.F. Rittmueller Middle School	525 East Genesee Street, Frankenmuth	Grades 5-8. Built 1980.
List Elementary	805 E Genesee St., Frankenmuth	Grades PreK-4. Built 1961.
