= Thomas Township, Michigan =

- Civil township
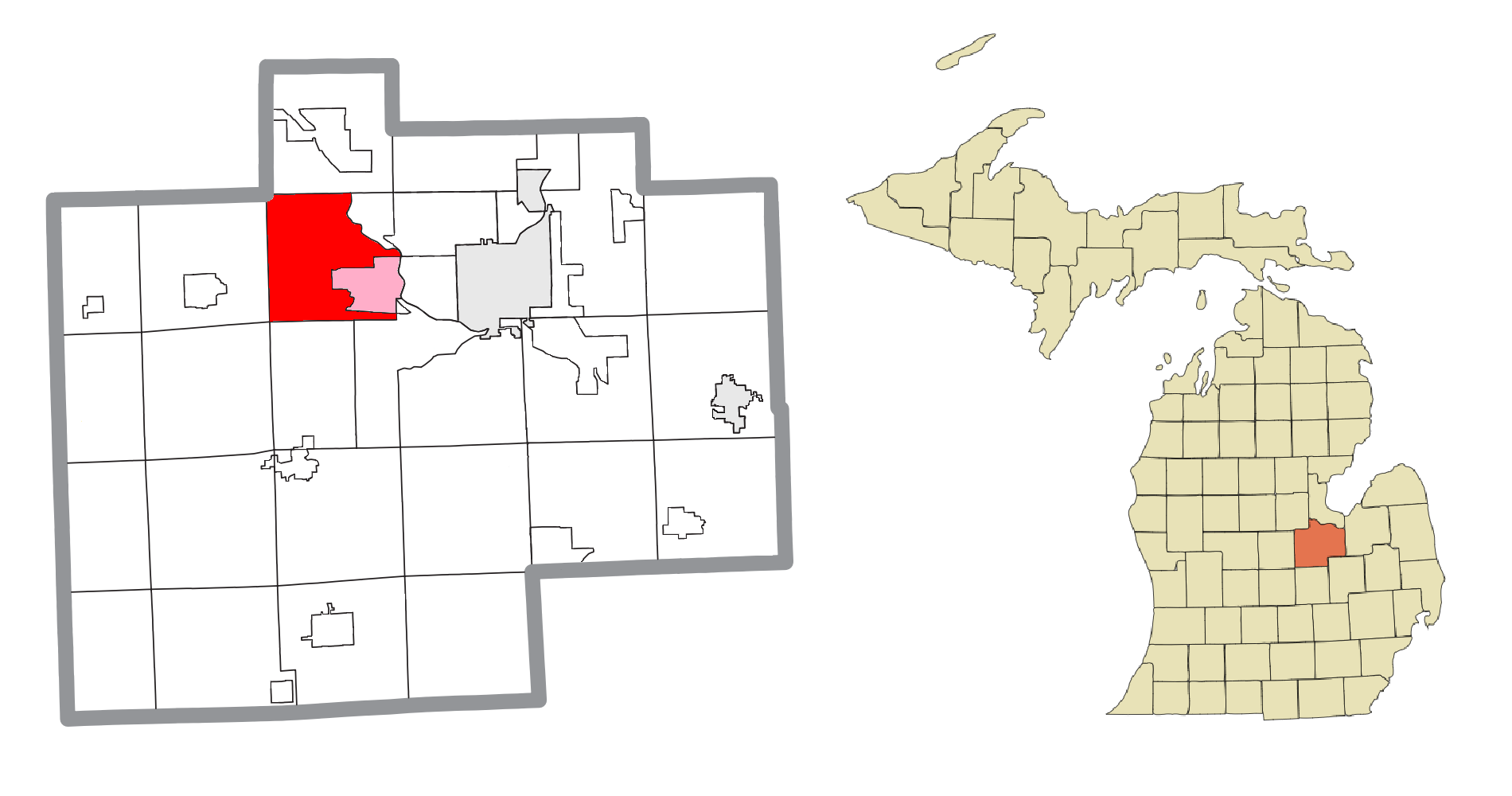
- Location within Saginaw County (red) and an administered portion of the Shields community (pink)

- Location within the state of Michigan Thomas Township (the United States)
- Coordinates: 43°25′40″N 84°06′17″W
- Country: United States
- State: Michigan
- County: Saginaw

Government
  - Supervisor: Robert Weise
  - Clerk: Edward Brosofski

Area
  - Total: 31.9 sq mi (82.7 km^{2})
  - Land: 31.5 sq mi (81.6 km^{2})
  - Water: 0.42 sq mi (1.1 km^{2})
- Elevation: 600 ft (183 m)

Population (2020)
  - Total: 11,931
  - Density: 379/sq mi (146/km^{2})
- Time zone: UTC-5 (Eastern (EST))
  - Summer (DST): UTC-4 (EDT)
- ZIP code(s): 48609 (Saginaw); 48623 (Freeland); 48626 (Hemlock)
- Area code: 989
- FIPS code: 26-79520
- GNIS feature ID: 1627160
- Website: Official website

Thomas Township is a civil township of Saginaw County in the U.S. state of Michigan. The 2020 Census places the population at 11,931.

== Communities ==
- Dice is an unincorporated community in the township at Dice and Thomas Roads.
- Frost is an unincorporated community in the township on Frost Road, between Graham and Lone Roads. A post office operated from April 13, 1880, until December 15, 1887, and again from January 24, 1888, until September 30, 1907.
- Shields is an unincorporated community and census-designated place (CDP) in the township.

== Geography ==
According to the United States Census Bureau, the township has a total area of 31.9 square miles (83 km^{2}), of which 31.5 square miles (82 km^{2}) is land and 0.4 square miles (1.0 km^{2}) (1.32%) is water.

== Demographics ==
Historical population
Census	Pop.	Note	%±
2000	11,877		—
2010	11,912		0.3%
2020	11,931		0.2%

As of the census of 2000, there were 11,877 people, 4,545 households, and 3,481 families residing in the township. The population density was 376.9 inhabitants per square mile (145.5/km^{2}). There were 4,700 housing units at an average density of 149.1 per square mile (57.6/km^{2}). The racial makeup of the township was 97.10% White, 0.62% African American, 0.22% Native American, 0.68% Asian, 0.61% from other races, and 0.76% from two or more races. Hispanic or Latino of any race were 2.64% of the population.

There were 4,545 households, out of which 32.0% had children under the age of 18 living with them, 66.1% were married couples living together, 7.7% had a female householder with no husband present, and 23.4% were non-families. 20.3% of all households were made up of individuals, and 8.1% had someone living alone who was 65 years of age or older. The average household size was 2.57 and the average family size was 2.97.

In the township the population was spread out, with 24.3% under the age of 18, 6.6% from 18 to 24, 26.0% from 25 to 44, 29.7% from 45 to 64, and 13.5% who were 65 years of age or older. The median age was 41 years. For every 100 females, there were 92.2 males. For every 100 females age 18 and over, there were 89.2 males.

The median income for a household in the township was $52,536, and the median income for a family was $59,271. Males had a median income of $48,523 versus $29,660 for females. The per capita income for the township was $25,700. About 1.7% of families and 3.5% of the population were below the poverty line, including 3.3% of those under age 18 and 5.2% of those age 65 or over.
