= Saginaw Public Schools =

School district in Michigan

Address
- 550 Millard St. Saginaw, Michigan, 48607; United States
- Coordinates: 43.42759°N 83.93515°W

District information
- Type: Public
- Grades: Pre-kindergarten through 12
- Superintendent: Ramont M. Roberts Ph.D.
- Schools: 16
- Budget: US$139,334,000 (2022-2022)
- NCES District ID: 2630390

Students and staff
- Students: 5,005 (2024-2025)
- Teachers: 284.68 (2024-2025)
- Staff: 700.69 (2024-2025)
- Student–teacher ratio: 17.58 (2024-2025)
- Athletic conference: Saginaw Valley League and Michigan Summit League

Other information
- Intermediate school district: Saginaw Intermediate School District
- Website: www.spsd.net

Saginaw Public Schools, also known as the School District of the City of Saginaw and Saginaw Public School District (SPSD), is a school district in Saginaw, Michigan. The district is a part of the Saginaw Intermediate School District, and serves the cities of Saginaw and Zilwaukee, the eastern part of Kochville Township, and portions of Buena Vista Township north of Hess Avenue.

== History ==
The original Arthur Hill High School was located at Court and Harrison Streets and was built in 1888. By 1936 the campus consisted of five buildings.

The new Arthur Hill High School opened in January 1940, with 45 percent of construction costs funded by the federal government. The architecture firm was Frantz & Spence. The building featured technology such as an "electric eye" in each classroom to control the lights.

Saginaw High School consisted of two buildings separated by busy Warren Avenue, one built in 1879 and the other built in 1903. By 1948, the campus was considered overcrowded and a fire hazard. That year, its bell tower was demolished due to fear that it would collapse. There was no library, no spectator seating in the gym, and the girls' locker room consisted of three showers and three bathtubs.

A replacement building had long been considered, but until 1948, a bond issue needed a two thirds majority of voters to be passed. When both a bond issue and a millage failed at the polls in 1949, students staged a walkout. A bond issue to build a new Saginaw High was approved by voters in 1950. The new Saginaw High School opened in November 1954. The building featured a state-of-the-art public address system that could broadcast records, voice, or radio broadcasts throughout the school.

The Buena Vista School District closed in 2013. The Saginaw School District acquired the Buena Vista headquarters building, all five school buildings and the majority of the school district territory. This territory included areas north of Hess Avenue except for the parcels located between Airport Road and Townline Road that are south of Holland. 261 new students from Buena Vista were expected to attend Saginaw schools. Ultimately 109 former Buena Vista students began attending Saginaw schools.

In 2024, Saginaw High School and Arthur High School merged within a new building, Saginaw United High School. Arthur Hill High became Saginaw Arts and Sciences Academy, and Saginaw High School became Saginaw Middle School.

== Schools ==
The Saginaw Public School District includes nine elementary schools, one K-8 school, two middle school, three high schools, a career center and an early childhood center.

School	Grades served	Address	Students in 2004 (K-12)*	Students in 2014 (K-12)**	Students in 2024	FTE Teachers, 2024	Student/teacher ratio, 2024	Notes
Arthur Eddy Academy	K-6	1000 Cathay St., Saginaw	392	425	325	18	18.06	Previously Arthur Eddy K-8 Academy; Magnet school
Chester F. Miller School	PK-6	2020 Brockway St., Saginaw	300	321	294	17	17.29	
Handley Elementary School	K-5	1300 Passolt St., Saginaw	415	428	320	18.5	17.3	School for academically talented children
Herig School	K-6	1905 Houghton Ave., Saginaw	284	394	316	16	19.75	
Jessie Loomis Elementary School	K-6	2000 Loomis, Saginaw	237	424	334	17	19.65	
Jessie Rouse Elementary School	K-6	435 Randolph St., Saginaw	245	274	224	13.5	16.59	
Kempton Elementary School	K-6	3040 Davenport Ave., Saginaw	253	399	354	19	18.63	
Merrill Park Elementary School	K-6	1800 Grout St., Saginaw	318	257	317	17.5	18.11	
Saginaw Arts and Sciences Academy (SASA)	6-12	3115 Mackinaw Street, Saginaw	361	628	401	28	14.32	Formerly Arthur Hill High School
Saginaw Career Complex (SCC)	NA	2102 Weiss St., Saginaw	91	12	30	22	1.36	
Saginaw Middle School	7-8	3100 Webber St., Saginaw	NA	NA	NA	NA	NA	Formerly Saginaw High School Built 1954.
Saginaw United High School	9-12	1903 N. Niagara St., Saginaw	NA	NA	NA	NA	NA	Created from the merger Arthur Hill High School and Saginaw High School. New facility opened fall 2024.
Stone Elementary School	K-6	1006 State St., Saginaw	298	232	350	19	18.42	
The Success Academy	5-12	1000 Tuscola St., Saginaw	N/A	N/A	169	3	56.33	Alternative school
Willie E. Thompson Middle School	7-8	3021 Court St., Saginaw	800	526	373	20.5	18.2	
Zilwaukee School	K-8	500 W. Johnson St., Saginaw	310	359	273	18.5	14.76	

*Note: Based on 2003-2004 student count data
**Note: Based on 2013-2014 student count data
***Note: Based on 2012-2013 school year data
Key: K=Kindergarten; PK=Pre-kindergarten; UG=No grade levels ("ungraded"); n/a=Not applicable (typically an independent charter school); {blank}=Data not available

=== Former schools ===
The district has closed, consolidated, or replaced several schools, including:

School	Low grade	High grade	Students*	Year closed	Notes
Arthur Hill High School	09	12	425	2024	Magnet school; merged into Saginaw United High School
C.C. Coulter Elementary School	PK	05	151 (2012)	2012	Offered all day Pre-Kindergarten, all day kindergarten, Accelerated Reading, structured tutorial, Foster Grandparents, Youth First, H.O.S.T, Title I and 31A Support, and 21st Century
Emerson Elementary School	PK	05	168 (2004)	2004	
Fuerbringer Elementary School	K	05	252 (2006)	2006	
Heavenrich School	PK	05	371 (2014)	2014	
Hillier Educational Center	08	12	15 (2012)	2012	
Houghton Elementary School	PK	05	275 (2014)	2014	
Jerome School	PK	05	204 (2013)	2013	
John Moore Elementary School	PK	05	168 (2004)	2004	
Jones Elementary School	K	05	209 (2006)	2006	
Longfellow Elementary School	PK	05	153 (2013)	2013	
Martha Longstreet Elementary School	PK	05	210 (2003)	2003	
Morley Elementary School	K	05	168 (2005)	2005	
Nelle Haley Elementary School	K	05	123 (2007)	2007	
North Middle School	06	08	319 (2006)	2006	
Ruben Daniels Middle School	06	08	456 (2014)	2014	Central Middle school was renamed Ruben Daniel's in the 2009–2010 school year due to the fact that Webber Middle school was shutting down and was combined with Central Middle school.
Saginaw High School	09	12	643	2024	Merged into Saginaw United High School
Salina Elementary School	PK	05	130 (2003)	2003	
Webber School	K	08	373 (2009)	2009	Webber Middle school was combined with Central Middle School, which was renamed Ruben Daniels Middle School.

*Note: Based student count data
Key: K=Kindergarten; PK=Pre-kindergarten; UG=No grade levels ("ungraded"); n/a=Not applicable (typically an independent charter school); {blank}=Data not available
