= Michigan's 94th House of Representatives district =

American legislative district

Michigan's 94th State House of Representatives district
Representative
Amos O'Neal; D–Saginaw
- Demographics: 47.8% White; 33.2% Black; 13.9% Hispanic; 1% Asian; 0.1% Native American; 0.1% Hawaiian/Pacific Islander; 0.2% Other; 3.8% Multiracial
- Population (2024): 89,287

Michigan's 94th House of Representatives district (also referred to as Michigan's 94th House district) is a legislative district within the Michigan House of Representatives located in part of Saginaw County. The district was created in 1965, when the Michigan House of Representatives district naming scheme changed from a county-based system to a numerical one.

== List of representatives ==
Representative	Party	Dates	Residence	Notes
George Sietsema	Democratic	1965–1966	Wyoming	
Johannes Kolderman	Republican	1967–1968	Wyoming	
Jelt Sietsema	Democratic	1969–1986	Wyoming	Lived in Grand Rapids until around 1983.
Ken Sikkema	Republican	1987–1992	Grandville	
Michael Goschka	Republican	1993–1998	Saginaw County	
Jim Howell	Republican	1999–2004	Swan Creek	Lived in St. Charles until around 2003.
Roger Kahn	Republican	2005–2006	Saginaw	
Ken Horn	Republican	2007–2012	Frankenmuth	
Tim Kelly	Republican	2013–2018	Saginaw Township	
Rodney Wakeman	Republican	2019–2022	Saginaw	
Amos O'Neal	Democratic	2023–present	Saginaw	

== Recent elections ==
=== 2020s ===
2026 Michigan House of Representatives election
Party	Candidate	Votes	%
Democratic	Amos O'Neal (incumbent)	24,571	72.53
Republican	Don Sugg	9,304	27.47
Total votes		33,875	100
Democratic hold			

2018 Michigan House of Representatives election
Party	Candidate	Votes	%
Republican	Rodney Wakeman	23,366	55.49
Democratic	Dave Adams	18,739	44.51
Total votes		42,105	100
Republican hold			

2016 Michigan House of Representatives election
Party	Candidate	Votes	%
Republican	Tim Kelly	30,150	64.77%
Democratic	Kevin C. Seamon	16,402	35.23%
Total votes		46,552	100.00%
Republican hold			

2014 Michigan House of Representatives election
Party	Candidate	Votes	%
Republican	Tim Kelly	20,925	62.35
Democratic	Vincent Mosca	12,634	37.65
Total votes		33,559	100.0
Republican hold			

2012 Michigan House of Representatives election
Party	Candidate	Votes	%
Republican	Tim Kelly	26,256	56.00
Democratic	Judith Lincoln	20,630	44.00
Total votes		46,886	100.0
Republican hold			

2010 Michigan House of Representatives election
Party	Candidate	Votes	%
Republican	Ken Horn	24,361	69.94
Democratic	Vince Mosca	10,470	30.06
Total votes		34,831	100.0
Republican hold			

2008 Michigan House of Representatives election
Party	Candidate	Votes	%
Republican	Ken Horn	28,448	57.66
Democratic	Bob Blaine	20,889	42.34
Total votes		49,337	100.0
Republican hold			

== Historical district boundaries ==
Map	Description	Apportionment Plan	Notes
	Kent County (part): Grand Rapids (part); Wyoming (part)	1964 Apportionment Plan	
	Kent County (part): Grand Rapids (part); Grandville (part); Wyoming	1972 Apportionment Plan	
	Kent County (part): Grandville; Walker; Wyoming	1982 Apportionment Plan	
	Saginaw County (part): Albee Township; Birch Run Township; Brady Township; Brant Township; Bridgeport Township; Chapin Township; Chesaning Township; Frankenmuth; Frankenmuth Township; Fremont Township; James Township; Jonesfield Township; Maple Grove Township; Marion Township; Richland Township; St. Charles Township; Spaulding Township; Swan Creek Township; Taymouth Township; Thomas Township; Tittabawassee Township	1992 Apportionment Plan	
	Saginaw County (part): Albee Township; Birch Run Township; Blumfield Township; Chesaning Township; Frankenmuth; Frankenmuth Township; James Township; Maple Grove Township; Saginaw Township; St. Charles Township; Swan Creek Township; Taymouth Township; Thomas Township	2001 Apportionment Plan	
	Saginaw County (part): Albee Township; Birch Run Township; Blumfield Township; Frankenmuth; Frankenmuth Township; Saginaw Township; St. Charles Township; Swan Creek Township; Taymouth Township; Thomas Township; Tittabawassee Township	2011 Apportionment Plan	
