= Michigan's 100th House of Representatives district =

American legislative district

Michigan's 100th State House of Representatives district
Representative
Tom Kunse; R–Grant Township, Clare County
- Demographics: 90.9% White; 1.5% Black; 2.7% Hispanic; 0.5% Asian; 0.4% Native American; 0.3% Other; 3.6% Multiracial
- Population (2024): 93,319

Michigan's 100th House of Representatives district (also referred to as Michigan's 100th House district) is a legislative district within the Michigan House of Representatives located in parts of Clare and Lake counties, as well as all of Mecosta and Osceola counties. The district was created in 1965, when the Michigan House of Representatives district naming scheme changed from a county-based system to a numerical one.

== List of representatives ==
Representative	Party	Dates	Residence	Notes
Russell H. Strange Jr.	Republican	1965–1970	Mount Pleasant	
John Engler	Republican	1971–1972	Mount Pleasant	
Bert C. Brennan	Republican	1973–1974	Saginaw	
J. Michael Busch	Republican	1975–1986	Saginaw	
Roland G. Niederstadt	Democratic	1987–1992	Saginaw	
John T. Llewellyn	Republican	1993–1998	Fremont	
Mike Pumford	Republican	1999–2004	Newaygo	
Goeff Hansen	Republican	2005–2010	Hart	
Jon Bumstead	Republican	2011–2016	Newaygo	
Scott VanSingel	Republican	2017–2022	Grant	
Tom Kunse	Republican	2023–present	Grant Township	

== Recent elections ==
=== 2020s ===
2026 Michigan House of Representatives election
Party	Candidate	Votes	%
Republican	Tom Kunse (incumbent)	27,528	65.57
Democratic	Tracy Ruell	14,452	34.43
Total votes		41,980	100
Republican hold			

2024 Michigan House of Representatives election
Party	Candidate	Votes	%
Republican	Tom Kunse	35,024	69.3
Democratic	Tracy Ruell	15,522	30.7
Total votes		50,546	100
Republican hold			

2022 Michigan House of Representatives election
Party	Candidate	Votes	%
Republican	Tom Kunse	26,911	68.4
Democratic	Nate Bailey	12,452	31.6
Total votes		39,363	100
Republican hold			

2020 Michigan House of Representatives election
Party	Candidate	Votes	%
Republican	Scott VanSingel	32,343	70.0
Democratic	Sandy Clarke	13,851	30.0
Total votes		46,194	100
Republican hold			

2018 Michigan House of Representatives election
Party	Candidate	Votes	%
Republican	Scott VanSingel	22,889	66.1
Democratic	Sandy Clarke	11,724	33.9
Total votes		34,613	100
Republican hold			

2016 Michigan House of Representatives election
Party	Candidate	Votes	%
Republican	Scott VanSingel	25,721	67.3
Democratic	Sandy Clarke	12,514	32.7
Total votes		38,235	100
Republican hold			

2014 Michigan House of Representatives election
Party	Candidate	Votes	%
Republican	Jon Bumstead	16,226	63.5
Democratic	Mark Balcom	9,330	36.5
Total votes		25,556	100
Republican hold			

2012 Michigan House of Representatives election
Party	Candidate	Votes	%
Republican	Jon Bumstead	22,752	62.3
Democratic	Ida DeHaas	13,800	37.8
Total votes		36,552	100
Republican hold			

2010 Michigan House of Representatives election
Party	Candidate	Votes	%
Republican	Jon Bumstead	17,163	66.4
Democratic	Bill Richards	8,695	33.6
Total votes		25,858	100
Republican hold			

2008 Michigan House of Representatives election
Party	Candidate	Votes	%
Republican	Goeff Hansen	21,947	55.8
Democratic	Bill Richards	16,341	41.6
Libertarian	Nathaniel Hren	1,020	2.6
Total votes		39,308	100
Republican hold			

== Historical district boundaries ==
Map	Description	Apportionment Plan	Notes
	Isabella County Montcalm County	1964 Apportionment Plan	
	Gratiot County (part): Bethany Township; Elba Township; Emerson Township; Hamilton Township; Ithaca; Lafayette Township; North Star Township; St. Louis (part); Washington Township; Wheeler Township; Saginaw County (part): Excluding; Albee Township; Birch Run Township; Blumfield Township; Bridgeport Township; Buena Vista Township; Carrollton Township; Frankenmuth; Frankenmuth Township; Saginaw; Saginaw Township (part); Spaulding Township; St. Charles Township; Taymouth Township; Zilwaukee; Zilwaukee Township	1972 Apportionment Plan	
	Saginaw County (part): Brady Township; Brant Township; Chapin Township; Chesaning Township; Fremont Township; James Township; Jonesfield Township; Kochville Township; Lakefield Township; Marion Township; Richland Township; Saginaw Township; St. Charles Township; Swan Creek Township; Thomas Township; Tittabawassee Township	1982 Apportionment Plan	
	Lake County; Mecosta County; Newaygo County	1992 Apportionment Plan	
	Lake County; Newaygo County; Oceana County	2001 Apportionment Plan	
	Lake County; Newaygo County; Oceana County	2011 Apportionment Plan	
