= St. Charles Community Schools =

School district in Michigan, United States

Address
- 891 West Walnut Street St. Charles, Saginaw County, Michigan, 48655; United States
- Coordinates: 43.29926°N 84.15419°W

District information
- Grades: PreKindergarten–12
- President: Marcia E. Kendall
- Vice-president: Allison Brady
- Superintendent: Ronald Stanley
- Schools: 3
- Budget: $11,306,000 2022-2023 expenditures
- NCES District ID: 2632640

Students and staff
- Students: 703 (2024-2025)
- Teachers: 45.3 (on an FTE basis) (2024-2025)
- Staff: 108.65 FTE (2024-2025)
- Student–teacher ratio: 15.52 (2024-2025)
- District mascot: Bulldogs
- Colors: Red and Black

Other information
- Intermediate school district: Saginaw Intermediate School District
- Website: www.stccs.org

St. Charles Community Schools is a public school district in Saginaw County, Michigan. It serves St. Charles and parts of the townships of Brant, Fremont, Marion, St. Charles, and Swan Creek.

== History ==
The current St. Charles Middle/High School was built in 1959. It replaced an earlier building that then became a dedicated elementary school, Miller Elementary. At its center was the 1884 union school, with later additions surrounding it. Patterson Elementary opened in January 1963, named for Mary Patterson, an elementary teacher in the district for 37 years.

The Fine Arts and Central Administration Building, as well as a middle school wing, were added to the high school in 1968. The middle school was named for Anna M. Thurston, a long-serving and highly regarded math teacher in the district.

In fall 2006, St. Charles consolidated its two elementary schools at Patterson Elementary, which became St. Charles Elementary. Sixteen new classrooms and a renovation were completed there, and Miller Elementary was sold and became an assisted living facility. The middle/high school was also renovated.

== Schools ==
Schools in St. Charles share a campus on the west side of St. Charles.

Schools in St. Charles Community Schools
| School | Address | Notes |
|---|---|---|
| St. Charles Community Middle/High School | 881 West Walnut Street, St. Charles | Grades 7–12. Built 1959. |
| St. Charles Elementary | 801 West Walnut Street, St. Charles | Grades K-6. Built 1963. |
| St. Charles Virtual School | 891 West Walnut Street, St. Charles | Virtual school. Grades 1-12. |
| St. Charles Preschool and Childcare | 801 West Walnut Street, St. Charles | Preschool. |
