= Merrill Community School District =

School district in Michigan

Merrill Community Schools

Address
- 555 West Alice Street Merrill, Saginaw County, Michigan, 48637; United States
- Coordinates: 43.40853°N 84.33230°W

District information
- Motto: Building our future together.
- Grades: PreKindergarten–12
- Superintendent: Allison Jordan
- Schools: 3
- Budget: $9,157,000 2022–2023 expenditures
- NCES District ID: 2623610

Students and staff
- Students: 458 (2024–2025)
- Teachers: 35.73 (on an FTE basis) (2024–2025)
- Staff: 93.01 FTE (2024–2025)
- Student–teacher ratio: 12.82 (2024–2025)
- District mascot: Vandals
- Colors: Orange and Black

Other information
- Intermediate school district: Saginaw Intermediate School District
- Website: www.merrillschools.org

Merrill Community School District is a public school district in Central Michigan. In Saginaw County, it serves Merrill and parts of the townships of Brant, Fremont, Jonesfield, Lakefield, and Marion. In Gratiot County, it serves parts of Lafayette Township and Wheeler Township. Midland County, it serves parts of Mt. Haley Township and Porter Township.

== History ==
A new school building was built in Merrill in 1889. The district added eleventh grade in 1917 and twelfth grade in 1918. The first class, consisting of one student, graduated that year. Construction of a new school was completed in 1939. An elementary school was built in 1953.

The current high school opened in December 1956. Additions were built in 1960.

The 1939 school building was renovated into apartments in 2023.

== Schools ==
Schools in Merrill Community Schools District share a campus on the southwest side of Merrill. The high school and middle school share a building.

Schools in Merrill Community School District district
School	Address	Notes
Merrill High School	555 West Alice Street, Merrill	Grades 9–12
Merrill Middle School	755 West Alice Street, Merrill	Grades 6-8
Merrill Elementary	345 West Alice Street, Merrill	Grades PreK-5
