= Elizabeth Lucas =

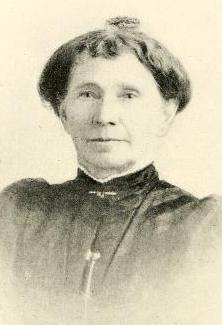
- Elizabeth Lucas, from an 1897 publication
- Born: 12 March 1835; Darlington, Ontario
- Died: 28 February 1919 (aged 83)
- Occupation: Nurse

Elizabeth Lucas (12 March 1835–28 February 1919) was a Union (American Civil War) nurse during the American Civil War.

== Early life ==
Lucas was born in Darlington, Ontario in 1835. Both her maternal and paternal grandparents were settlers in Connecticut and served in the American Revolution under George Washington, allegedly crossing the Delaware with him.

On September 28, 1852, Lucas married William Lucas. The couple later moved to Michigan.

== Civil War Service ==
Of the pair, Lucas's husband enlisted first on January 5, 1864, in the 4th Michigan Cavalry. In the fall of that year, when the regiment was in Louisville for recruitment, William Lucas fell ill and Elizabeth Lucas went to care for him. When the regiment left for the front, Lucas followed. In January of the following year, Lucas served at the Brown Hospital in the linen room. When her husband later broke his leg, she had him transferred to Brown Hospital so she could monitor his care. Lucas's daughter also worked with her, but as she was too young to be a nurse, she served exclusively in the linen room.

== After the war ==
Brown Hospital eventually was broken up, and Lucas was discharged in August 1865 after three years of service and moved to a farm in Swan Creek, Michigan. She received a pension for her service.
