= Hemlock, Michigan =

- Census-designated place (CDP) & unincorporated community
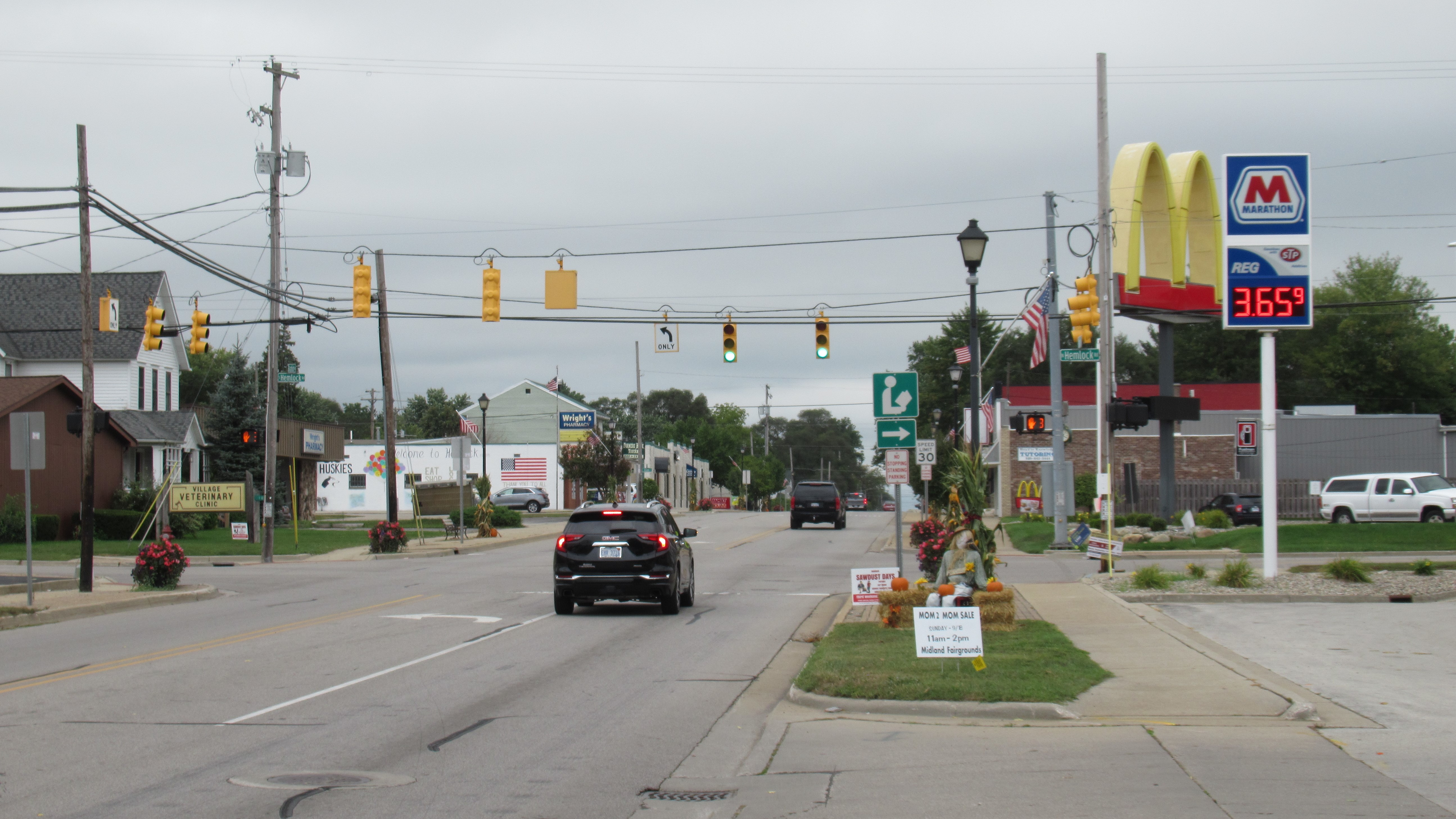
- Looking west along M-46 at N. Hemlock Road
- Nickname: The Quad of the East
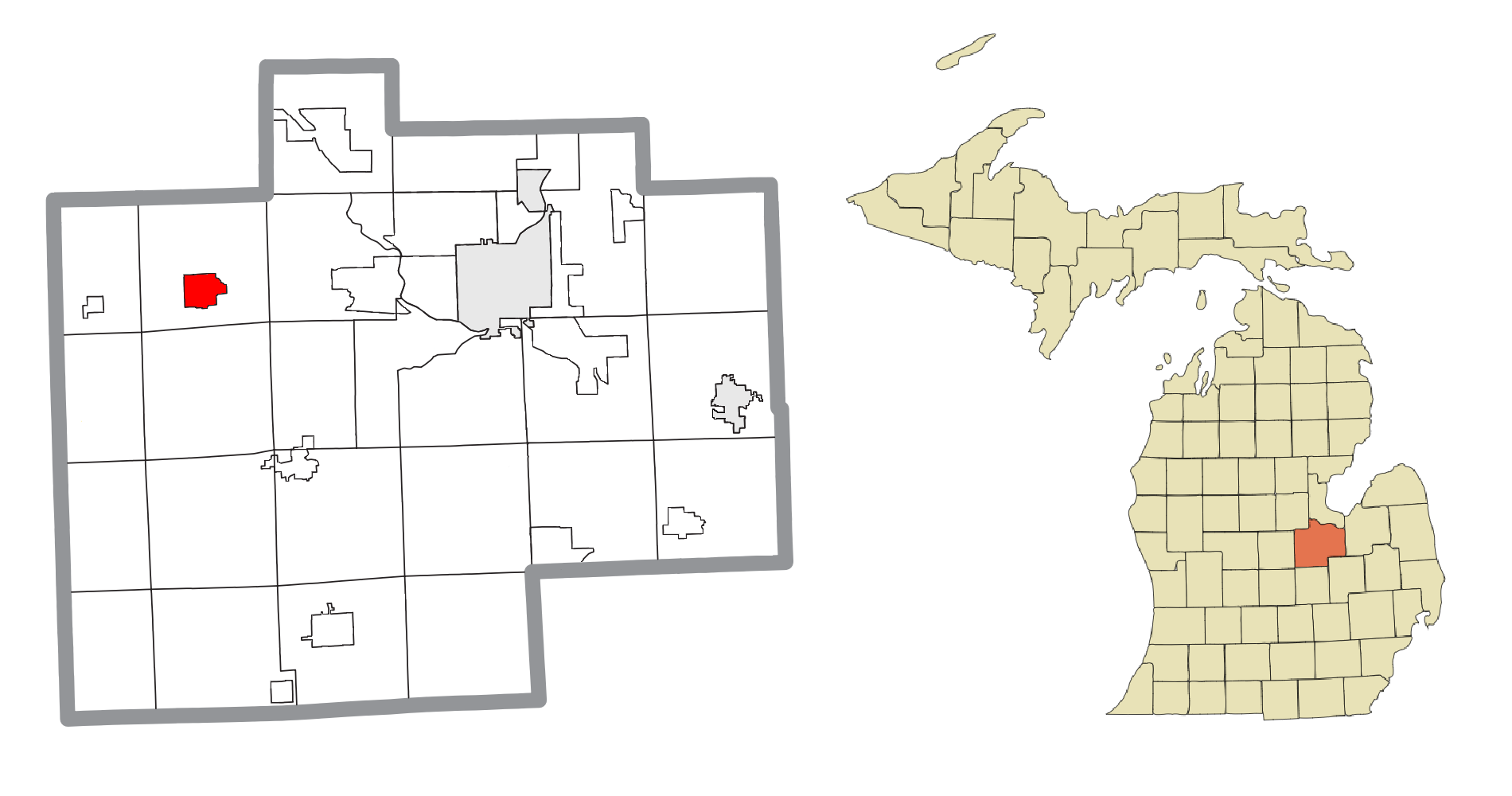
- Location within Saginaw County

- Location within the state of Michigan Location within the United States
- Coordinates: 43°25′07″N 84°13′52″W
- Country: United States
- State: Michigan
- County: Saginaw
- Township: Richland

Area
  - Total: 2.78 sq mi (7.19 km^{2})
  - Land: 2.75 sq mi (7.13 km^{2})
  - Water: 0.023 sq mi (0.06 km^{2})
- Elevation: 650 ft (200 m)

Population (2020)
  - Total: 1,408
  - Density: 511.7/sq mi (197.55/km^{2})
- Time zone: UTC-5 (Eastern (EST))
  - Summer (DST): UTC-4 (EDT)
- ZIP code(s): 48626
- Area code: 989
- FIPS code: 26-37600
- GNIS feature ID: 2393046

Hemlock is an unincorporated community in Richland Township, Saginaw County in the U.S. state of Michigan. It is also a census-designated place (CDP) for statistical purposes, but without any legal status as an incorporated municipality. The population of the CDP was 1,408 at the 2020 census. The area included in the CDP is in the south central portion of Richland Township. The Hemlock post office, with ZIP code 48626, serves nearly all of Richland Township, as well as portions of Fremont Township to the south, small areas of Thomas and Swan Creek townships to the southeast, and part of Ingersoll Township to the north in Midland County.

== History ==
The community was first settled in 1865. A Post Office was established in 1869 with the name "Hemlock City". This was shortened to Hemlock in 1895. Its annual festival, known as Sawdust Days, is held in September. The festival started in the late 1970s after the local hardware store held a chainsaw promotion and demonstration on the third Saturday of September.

== Geography ==
According to the United States Census Bureau, the CDP has a total area of 2.5 square miles (6.5 km^{2}), all land.

== Demographics ==
Historical population
Census	Pop.	Note	%±
2020	1,408		—
U.S. Decennial Census

As of the census of 2000, there were 1,585 people, 618 households, and 443 families residing in the CDP. The population density was 624.1 inhabitants per square mile (241.0/km^{2}). There were 650 housing units at an average density of 255.9 per square mile (98.8/km^{2}). The racial makeup of the CDP was 97.98% White, 0.13% African American, 0.32% Native American, 0.06% Asian, 1.32% from other races, and 0.19% from two or more races. Hispanic or Latino of any race were 2.78% of the population.

Out of the 618 households, 38.0% had children under the age of 18 living with them, 52.1% were married couples living together, 15.2% had a female householder with no husband present, and 28.3% were non-families. 24.8% of all households were made up of individuals, and 9.9% had someone living alone who was 65 years of age or older. The average household size was 2.55 and the average family size was 3.03.

In the CDP, the population was spread out, with 29.5% under the age of 18, 6.9% from 18 to 24, 30.6% from 25 to 44, 20.3% from 45 to 64, and 12.7% who were 65 years of age or older. The median age was 34 years. For every 100 females, there were 90.0 males. For every 100 females age 18 and over, there were 82.7 males.

The median income for a household in the CDP was $40,846, and the median income for a family was $45,074. Males had a median income of $42,448 versus $23,512 for females. The per capita income for the CDP was $18,085. About 9.5% of families and 9.9% of the population were below the poverty line, including 8.1% of those under age 18 and 7.0% of those age 65 or over.
