= Tom Kunse =

American politician from Michigan

Minority Leader-elect of the Michigan House of Representatives
- Assuming office January 2027
- Succeeding: Ranjeev Puri

Member of the Michigan House of Representatives from the 100th district
- Incumbent
- Assumed office January 1, 2023
- Preceded by: Scott VanSingel (redistricting)

Personal details
- Born: Pontiac, Michigan
- Party: Republican
- Education: Michigan Technological University; Central Michigan University

Tom Kunse is an American politician from Michigan who has represented the 100th district in the Michigan House of Representatives since the 2022 election. He was reelected in 2024.

Following the 2026 Michigan House of Representatives election, Kunse was chosen by the caucus to become the minority leader.

== See also ==
- Official website at the Michigan House of Representatives
- Campaign website
