= Scott VanSingel =

American politician

Member of the Michigan House of Representatives from the 100th district
- In office January 1, 2017 – January 1, 2023
- Preceded by: Jon Bumstead
- Succeeded by: Tom Kunse

Personal details
- Born: October 5, 1979 (age 46) Grand Rapids, Michigan, U.S.
- Party: Republican

Scott VanSingel (born October 5, 1979) is an American politician who served in the Michigan House of Representatives from the 100th district from 2017 to 2023. On November 10, 2020, VanSingel tested positive for COVID-19.
