= James Township, Michigan =

- Civil township
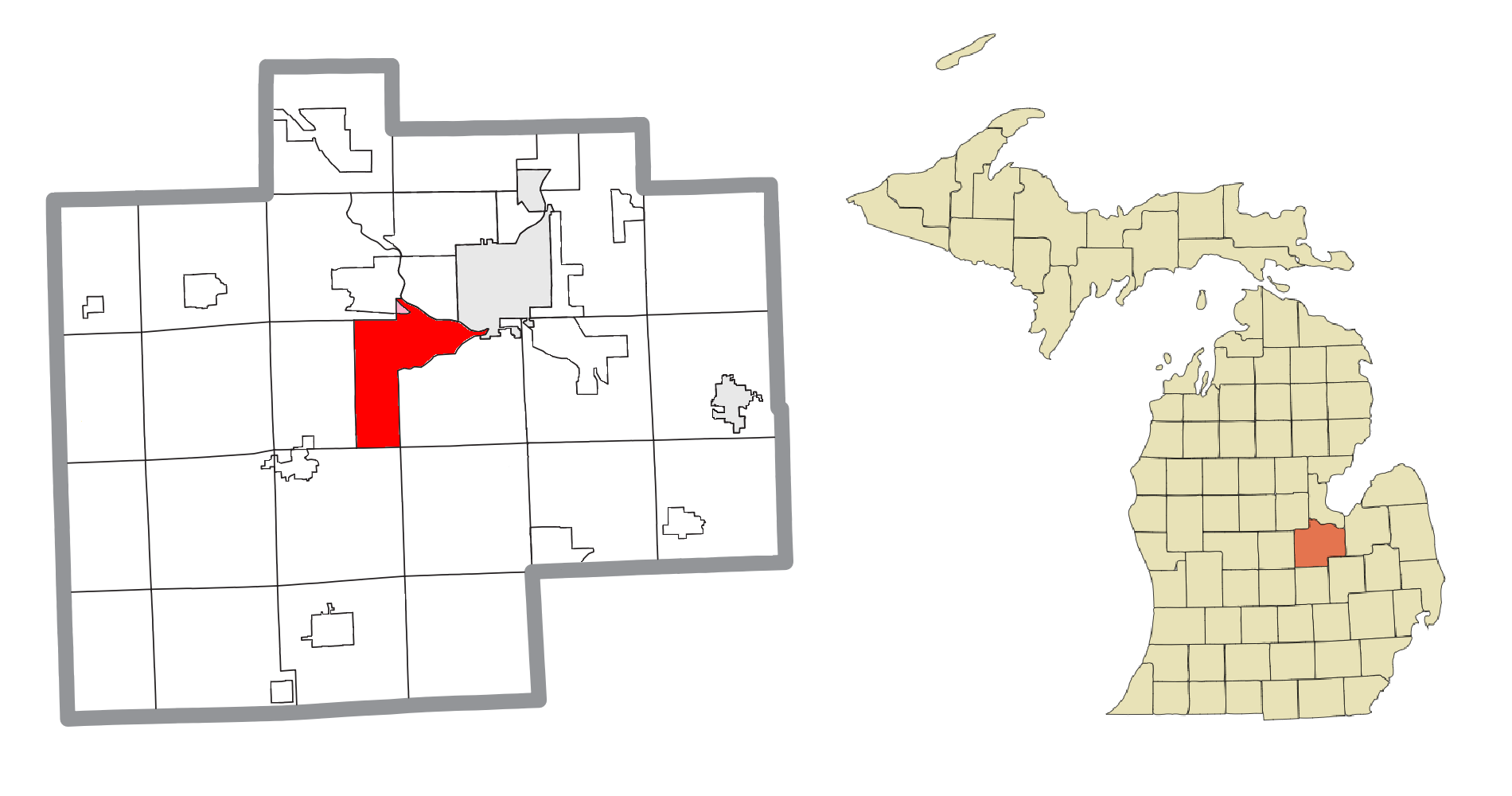
- Location within Saginaw County (red) and an administered portion of the Shields community (pink)

- Location within the state of Michigan James Township (the United States)
- Coordinates: 43°21′13″N 84°03′22″W
- Country: United States
- State: Michigan
- County: Saginaw

Government
  - Supervisor: Edward Hak
  - Clerk: James Gray

Area
  - Total: 19.5 sq mi (50.5 km^{2})
  - Land: 18.1 sq mi (47.0 km^{2})
  - Water: 1.4 sq mi (3.5 km^{2})
- Elevation: 581 ft (177 m)

Population (2020)
  - Total: 1,792
  - Density: 98.8/sq mi (38.1/km^{2})
- Time zone: UTC-5 (Eastern (EST))
  - Summer (DST): UTC-4 (EDT)
- ZIP code(s): 48601, 48602, 48609 (Saginaw); 48655 (St. Charles)
- Area code: 989
- FIPS code: 26-41480
- GNIS feature ID: 1626536
- Website: Official website

James Township is a civil township of Saginaw County in the U.S. state of Michigan. The population was 1,792 at the 2020 Census.

== Communities ==
- Swan Creek is an unincorporated community on the border with Swan Creek Township at Swan Creek and Van Wormer Roads.
- A small portion of Shields, a census-designated place, extends into James Township.

== Geography ==
According to the United States Census Bureau, the township has a total area of 19.5 square miles (51 km^{2}), of which 18.2 square miles (47 km^{2}) is land and 1.4 square miles (3.6 km^{2}) (6.92%) is water.

== Demographics ==
As of the census of 2000, there were 1,930 people, 745 households, and 578 families residing in the township. The population density was 106.3 inhabitants per square mile (41.0/km^{2}). There were 763 housing units at an average density of 42.0 per square mile (16.2/km^{2}). The racial makeup of the township was 97.51% White, 0.10% African American, 0.41% Native American, 0.05% Asian, 0.05% Pacific Islander, 0.52% from other races, and 1.35% from two or more races. Hispanic or Latino of any race were 3.16% of the population.

There were 745 households, out of which 32.6% had children under the age of 18 living with them, 67.7% were married couples living together, 7.4% had a female householder with no husband present, and 22.3% were non-families. 18.4% of all households were made up of individuals, and 7.4% had someone living alone who was 65 years of age or older. The average household size was 2.59 and the average family size was 2.95.

In the township the population was spread out, with 23.4% under the age of 18, 7.4% from 18 to 24, 28.1% from 25 to 44, 30.6% from 45 to 64, and 10.5% who were 65 years of age or older. The median age was 41 years. For every 100 females, there were 106.0 males. For every 100 females age 18 and over, there were 101.2 males.

The median income for a household in the township was $54,286, and the median income for a family was $59,922. Males had a median income of $42,469 versus $27,371 for females. The per capita income for the township was $22,340. About 3.1% of families and 3.7% of the population were below the poverty line, including 2.7% of those under age 18 and 8.7% of those age 65 or over.
