= Richland Township, Saginaw County, Michigan =

Richland Township, Michigan
- Civil township
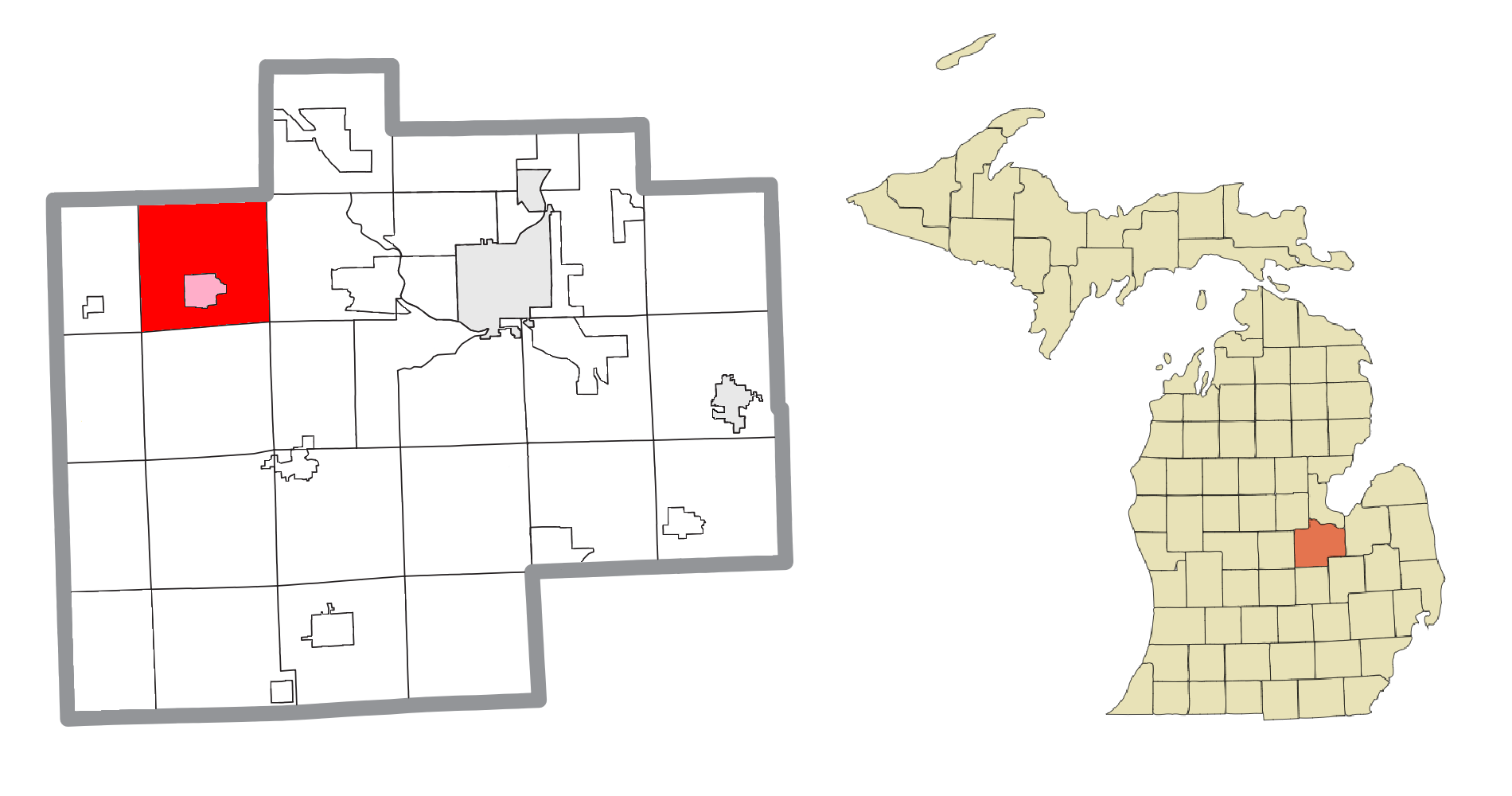
- Location within Saginaw County (red) and the administered community of Hemlock (pink)

- Location within the state of Michigan Richland Township (the United States)
- Coordinates: 43°25′10″N 84°13′12″W
- Country: United States
- State: Michigan
- County: Saginaw

Government
  - Supervisor: Brian Frederick
  - Clerk: Renee Herhold

Area
  - Total: 37.1 sq mi (96.0 km^{2})
  - Land: 37.1 sq mi (96.0 km^{2})
  - Water: 0 sq mi (0.0 km^{2})
- Elevation: 640 ft (195 m)

Population (2020)
  - Total: 3,955
  - Density: 107/sq mi (41.2/km^{2})
- Time zone: UTC-5 (Eastern (EST))
  - Summer (DST): UTC-4 (EDT)
- ZIP code(s): 48623 (Freeland); 48626 (Hemlock); 48637 (Merrill)
- Area code: 989
- FIPS code: 26-68340
- GNIS feature ID: 1626974
- Website: Official website

Richland Township is a civil township of Saginaw County in the U.S. state of Michigan. The 2020 Census placed the population at 3,955, which is a decrease from the 4,144 residents recorded at the 2010 Census.

== Communities ==
- Hemlock is an unincorporated community and census-designated place of at the center of the township and holds the township offices.
- Iva is an unincorporated community at Dice and Iva Road. A post office operated from December 7, 1894, until October 14, 1904.

== Geography ==
According to the United States Census Bureau, the township has a total area of 37.1 square miles (96 km^{2}), all land.

== Demographics ==
As of the census of 2000, there were 4,281 people, 1,567 households, and 1,220 families residing in the township. The population density was 115.4 inhabitants per square mile (44.6/km^{2}). There were 1,638 housing units at an average density of 44.2 per square mile (17.1/km^{2}). The racial makeup of the township was 98.22% White, 0.07% African American, 0.23% Native American, 0.21% Asian, 0.79% from other races, and 0.47% from two or more races. Hispanic or Latino of any race were 1.96% of the population.

There were 1,567 households, out of which 37.1% had children under the age of 18 living with them, 63.8% were married couples living together, 10.1% had a female householder with no husband present, and 22.1% were non-families. 19.2% of all households were made up of individuals, and 7.8% had someone living alone who was 65 years of age or older. The average household size was 2.72 and the average family size was 3.10.

In the township the population was spread out, with 27.8% under the age of 18, 7.2% from 18 to 24, 29.1% from 25 to 44, 24.2% from 45 to 64, and 11.7% who were 65 years of age or older. The median age was 36 years. For every 100 females, there were 95.7 males. For every 100 females age 18 and over, there were 91.0 males.

The median income for a household in the township was $45,580, and the median income for a family was $51,304. Males had a median income of $41,556 versus $24,351 for females. The per capita income for the township was $19,362. About 5.3% of families and 5.9% of the population were below the poverty line, including 5.4% of those under age 18 and 5.1% of those age 65 or over.
