= Albee Township, Michigan =

- Civil township
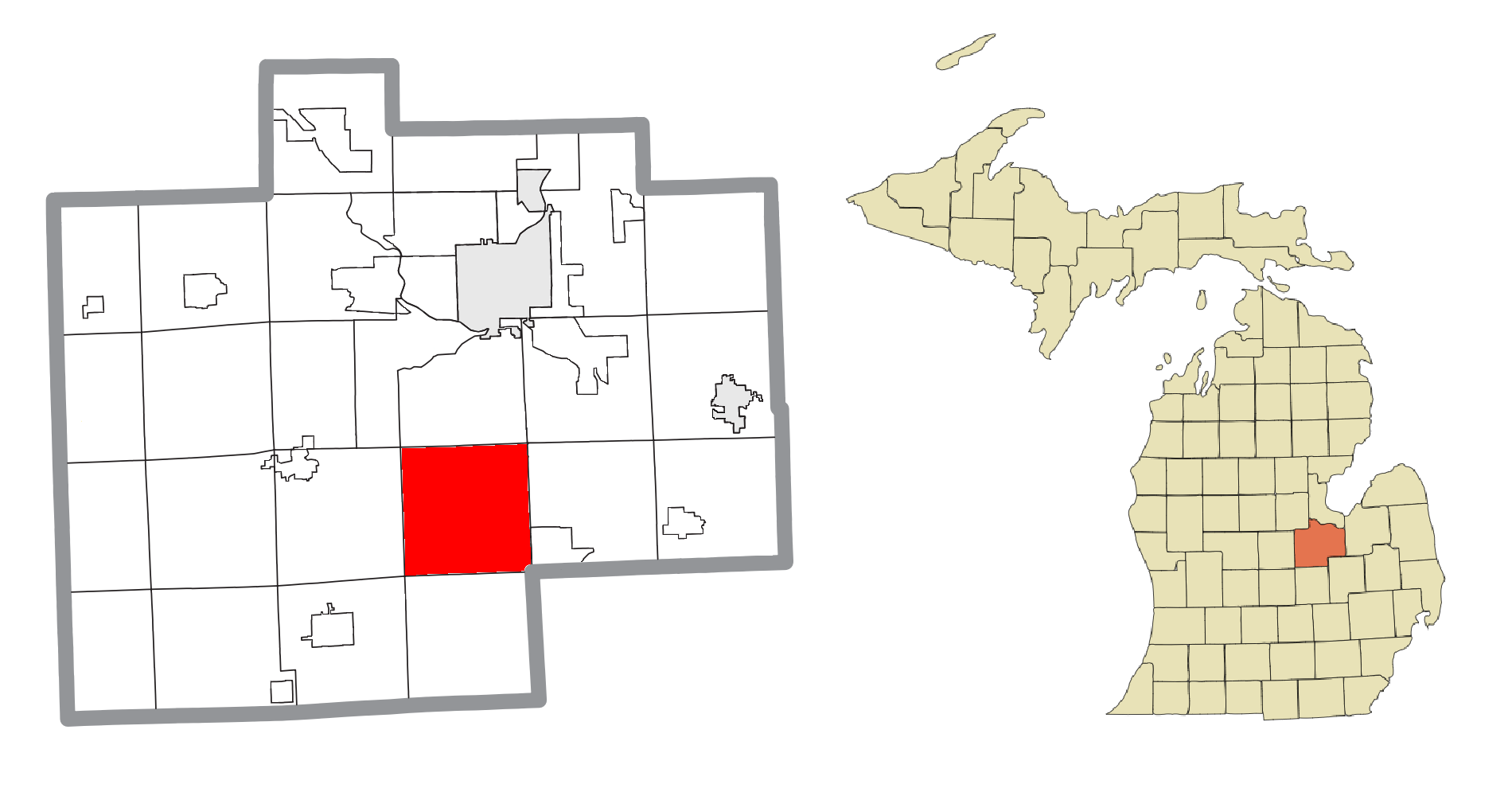
- Location within Saginaw County

- Location within the state of Michigan Albee Township (the United States)
- Coordinates: 43°15′36″N 83°58′55″W
- Country: United States
- State: Michigan
- County: Saginaw
- Established: 1863

Government
  - Supervisor: Leon Turnwald

Area
  - Total: 36.1 sq mi (93.6 km^{2})
  - Land: 36.1 sq mi (93.5 km^{2})
  - Water: 0.039 sq mi (0.1 km^{2})
- Elevation: 584 ft (178 m)

Population (2020)
  - Total: 2,046
  - Density: 56.7/sq mi (21.9/km^{2})
- Time zone: UTC-5 (Eastern (EST))
  - Summer (DST): UTC-4 (EDT)
- ZIP code(s): 48417 (Burt); 48457 (Montrose); 48655 (St. Charles)
- Area code: 989
- FIPS code: 26-00920
- GNIS feature ID: 1625811
- Website: https://albeetwp.com/

Albee Township is a civil township of Saginaw County in the U.S. state of Michigan. As of the 2020 Census, the township population was 2,046. Albee Township was established in 1863.

== Communities ==
- Albee was settled in 1855.
- Alicia is an unincorporated community in the township at Bishop and Alicia Roads at 43°16′15″N 84°01′57″W. A post office operated from January 26, 1904, until May 31, 1947.
- Carbon had a post office from 1899 until 1903. In this part of the township there were coal mines.
- McDonough Corners, or Mc Donagh, is a location in the township at Fergus and Bishop Roads at 43°15′22″N 84°01′55″W. A post office named McDonough operated from August 8, 1892, until June 30, 1903.
- Luce is an unincorporated community in the township at its western border with St. Charles Township at Burt and Gasper Roads. A post office operated from March 31, 1890, until January 15, 1914.

== Geography ==
According to the United States Census Bureau, the township has a total area of 36.2 square miles (94 km^{2}), of which 36.1 square miles (93 km^{2}) is land and 0.1 square miles (0.26 km^{2}) (0.14%) is water. Misteguay Creek flows northward through the township.

== Demographics ==
As of the census of 2000, there were 2,338 people, 796 households, and 643 families residing in the township. The population density was 64.8 inhabitants per square mile (25.0/km^{2}). There were 863 housing units at an average density of 23.9 per square mile (9.2/km^{2}). The racial makeup of the township was 93.03% White, 1.92% African American, 0.51% Native American, 0.04% Asian, 2.44% from other races, and 2.05% from two or more races. Hispanic or Latino of any race were 5.99% of the population.

There were 796 households, out of which 38.6% had children under the age of 18 living with them, 66.5% were married couples living together, 8.9% had a female householder with no husband present, and 19.2% were non-families. 15.6% of all households were made up of individuals, and 6.5% had someone living alone who was 65 years of age or older. The average household size was 2.91 and the average family size was 3.22.

In the township the population was spread out, with 28.9% under the age of 18, 6.8% from 18 to 24, 30.6% from 25 to 44, 24.7% from 45 to 64, and 9.0% who were 65 years of age or older. The median age was 35 years. For every 100 females, there were 103.1 males. For every 100 females age 18 and over, there were 103.3 males.

The median income for a household in the township was $42,000, and the median income for a family was $43,917. Males had a median income of $38,000 versus $22,008 for females. The per capita income for the township was $16,415. About 6.5% of families and 9.2% of the population were below the poverty line, including 12.9% of those under age 18 and 1.6% of those age 65 or over.
