= Fremont Township, Saginaw County, Michigan =

Fremont Township, Michigan
- Civil township
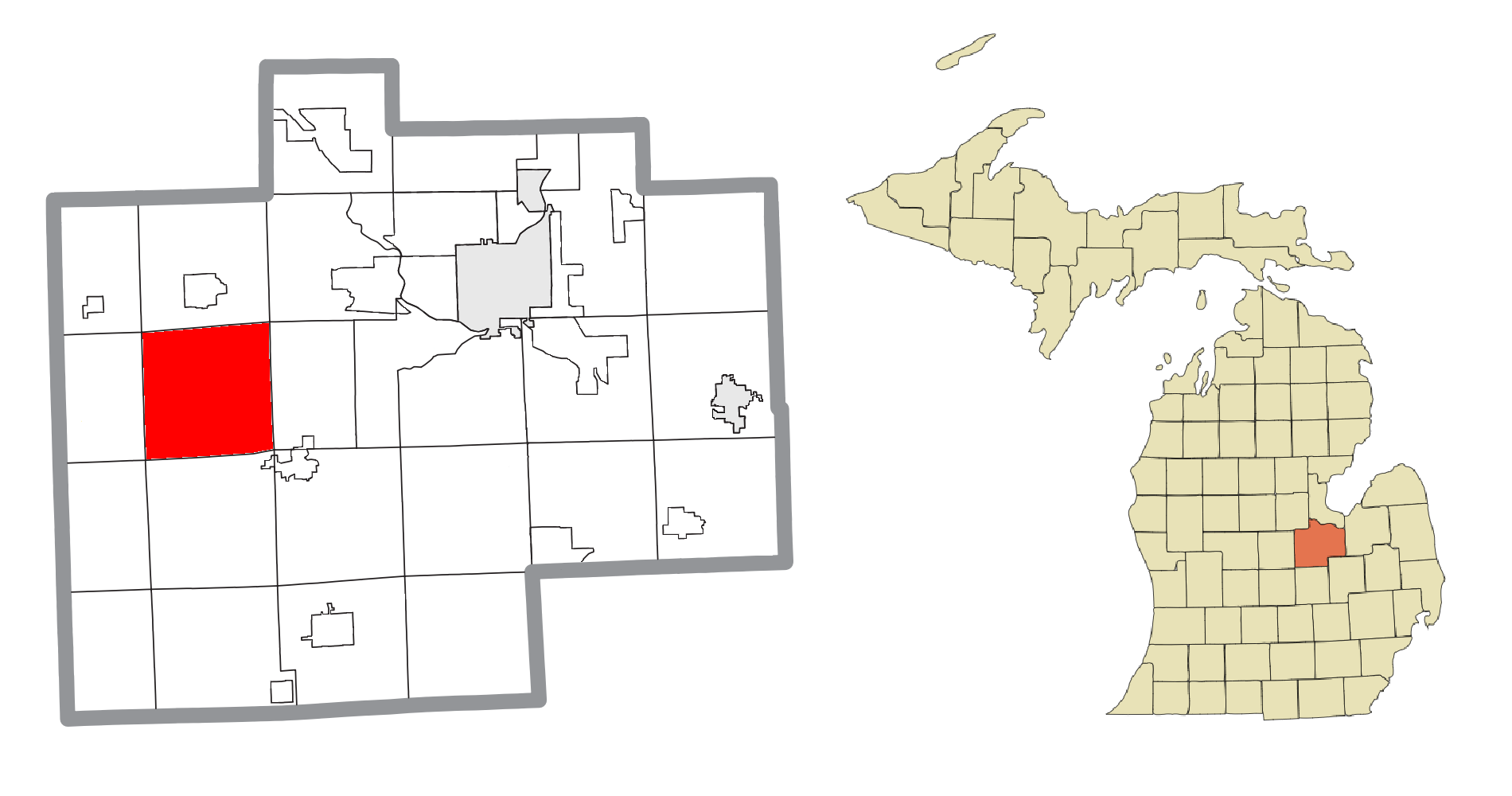
- Location within Saginaw County

- Location within the state of Michigan Fremont Township (the United States)
- Coordinates: 43°20′28″N 84°13′28″W
- Country: United States
- State: Michigan
- County: Saginaw

Government
  - Supervisor: Donald LaClair
  - Clerk: Ernest Delemeester

Area
  - Total: 36.8 sq mi (95.2 km^{2})
  - Land: 36.8 sq mi (95.2 km^{2})
  - Water: 0 sq mi (0.0 km^{2})
- Elevation: 620 ft (190 m)

Population (2020)
  - Total: 1,998
  - Density: 54.4/sq mi (21.0/km^{2})
- Time zone: UTC-5 (Eastern (EST))
  - Summer (DST): UTC-4 (EDT)
- ZIP code(s): 48626 (Hemlock); 48637 (Merrill); 48655 (St. Charles)
- Area code: 989
- FIPS code: 26-30720
- GNIS feature ID: 1626318
- Website: Official website

Fremont Township is a civil township of Saginaw County in the U.S. state of Michigan. The population was 1,998 at the 2020 Census.

== Communities ==
- Nelson is an unincorporated community in the township at Nelson and Hemlock Roads. A post office operated from June 4, 1883, until May 31, 1912.
- Roosevelt is an unincorporated community in the township at Lakefield and Fordney Roads. A post office operated from September 26, 1901, until June 30, 1902.

== Geography ==
According to the United States Census Bureau, the township has a total area of 36.8 square miles (95 km^{2}), all land.

== Demographics ==
As of the census of 2000, there were 2,099 people, 745 households, and 616 families residing in the township. The population density was 57.1 inhabitants per square mile (22.0/km^{2}). There were 772 housing units at an average density of 21.0 per square mile (8.1/km^{2}). The racial makeup of the township was 97.33% White, 0.10% African American, 0.52% Native American, 0.33% Asian, 0.67% from other races, and 1.05% from two or more races. Hispanic or Latino of any race were 2.05% of the population.

There were 745 households, out of which 37.2% had children under the age of 18 living with them, 71.7% were married couples living together, 8.3% had a female householder with no husband present, and 17.3% were non-families. 15.4% of all households were made up of individuals, and 5.6% had someone living alone who was 65 years of age or older. The average household size was 2.82 and the average family size was 3.13.

In the township the population was spread out, with 26.5% under the age of 18, 7.6% from 18 to 24, 27.8% from 25 to 44, 29.0% from 45 to 64, and 9.1% who were 65 years of age or older. The median age was 39 years. For every 100 females, there were 102.2 males. For every 100 females age 18 and over, there were 99.7 males.

The median income for a household in the township was $47,841, and the median income for a family was $50,385. Males had a median income of $37,115 versus $27,167 for females. The per capita income for the township was $19,210. About 7.2% of families and 9.9% of the population were below the poverty line, including 15.2% of those under age 18 and 6.0% of those age 65 or over.

== Historical marker ==
The Fowler Schoolhouse, built in 1882, was the first frame school building for School District No. 1. The school closed in 1943 and was moved from its original site to a rural setting on Murphy Farm, a public education resource operated by the Hartley Outdoor Education Center, where it will be restored.
