= Saginaw County, Michigan =

County in Michigan, United States

- County
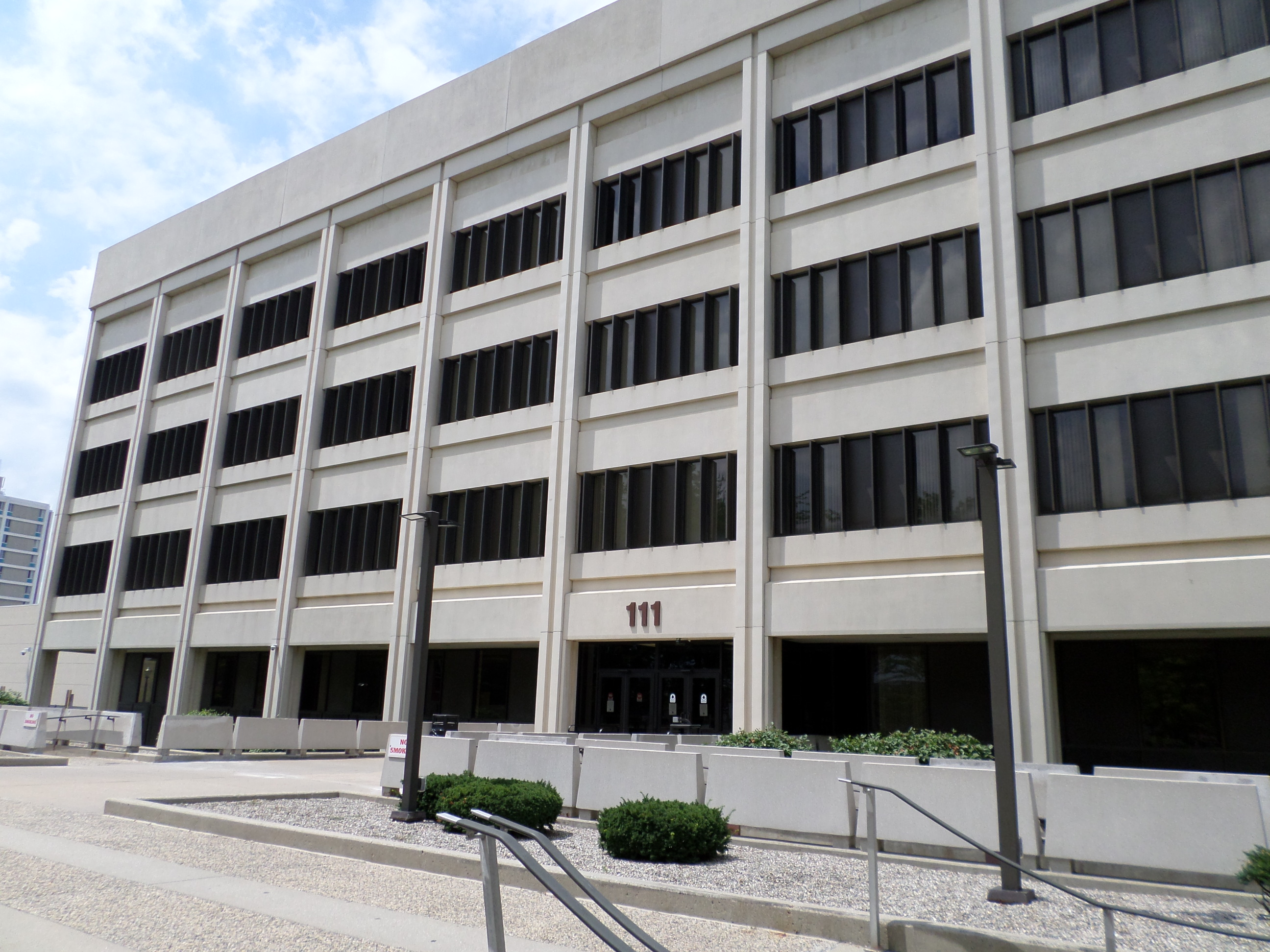
- Saginaw County Governmental Center in Saginaw

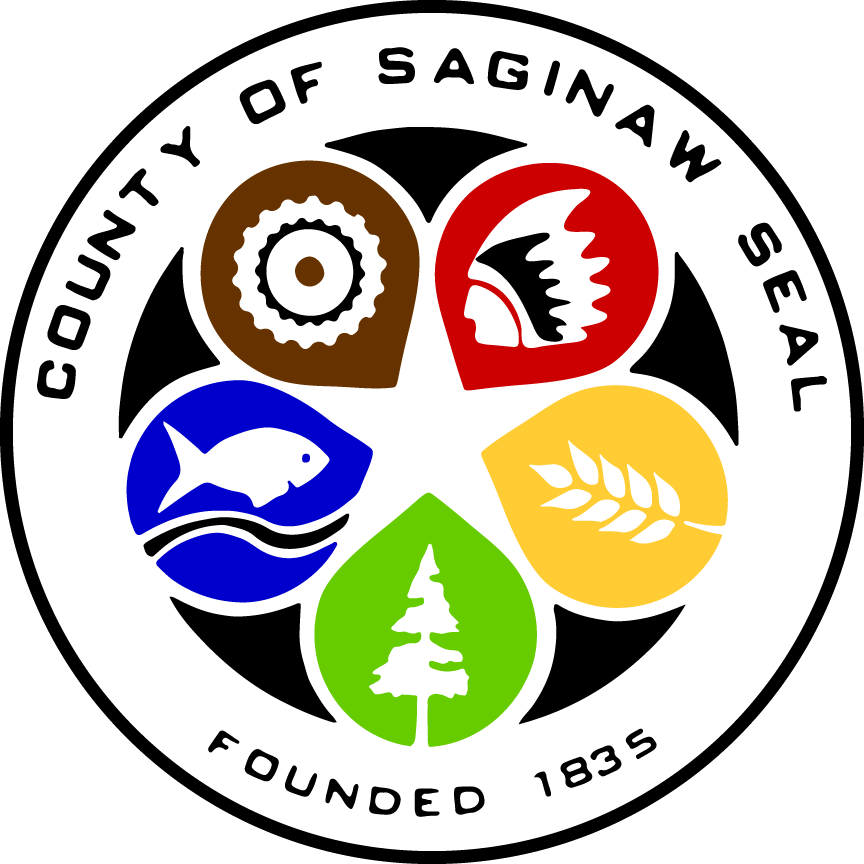
- Flag Seal

- Location within the U.S. state of Michigan
- Coordinates: 43°20′N 84°03′W
- Country: United States
- State: Michigan
- Founded: February 9, 1835
- Seat: Saginaw
- Largest city: Saginaw

Area
  - Total: 816 sq mi (2,110 km^{2})
  - Land: 800 sq mi (2,100 km^{2})
  - Water: 16 sq mi (41 km^{2}) 1.9%

Population (2020)
  - Total: 190,124
  - Estimate (2025): 187,688 ▼
  - Density: 250/sq mi (97/km^{2})
- Time zone: UTC−5 (Eastern)
  - Summer (DST): UTC−4 (EDT)
- Congressional district: 8th
- Website: www.saginawcountymi.gov

Saginaw County (SAG-ə-naw) is a county located in the U.S. state of Michigan. As of the 2020 Census, the population was 190,124. The county seat is Saginaw. The county was created by September 10, 1822, and was fully organized on February 9, 1835. The etymology of the county's name is uncertain. It may be derived from Sace-nong or Sak-e-nong (English: Sauk land), as the Sauk (French: Sac) tribe is believed by some to have once lived there. A more likely possibility is that it comes from Ojibwe words meaning "place of the outlet" –sag (English: an opening) and ong (English: place of). See List of Michigan county name etymologies.

Saginaw County comprises the Saginaw, MI Metropolitan Statistical Area and is included in the Saginaw-Midland-Bay City Combined Statistical Area, the 5th largest metropolitan area in Michigan.

== Etymology ==
The name Saginaw is widely believed to mean "where the Sauk were" in Ojibwe, from Sace-nong or Sak-e-nong (Sauk Town), due to the belief that the Sauk once lived there. But it is more likely that the name means "place of the outlet", from the Ojibwe sag (opening) and ong (place of).

When indigenous people he met told Samuel de Champlain that the Sauk nation was on the western shore of Lake Michigan, Champlain mistakenly placed them on the western shore of Lake Huron. This mistake was copied on subsequent maps, and future references identified this as the place of the Sauks. Champlain himself never visited what is now Michigan.

== History ==
The area was inhabited from about 1000 B.C. to 1000 A.D. by the Native American Hopewell culture, followed by the Anishnabeg. Some historians believe that the Sauk at one time lived in the area and were driven out by Ojibwe (Chippewa), before the area was first visited by Europeans.

The Saginaw region includes an extensive network of many rivers and streams which converge into the Saginaw River and provided a means for easy travel for the Native American population among numerous settlements and hunting areas, as well as access to Lake Huron. Saginaw was also a frequent meeting location for councils of the Ojibwe, Pottawatomi, and Ottawa—the Three Fires of the Anishnabeg.

What is today Saginaw County was inhabited by the Ojibwe at the time of the arrival of Euro-Americans. The Ojibwe were still the dominant force in the area in the 1820s, and in 1827 they were attacked by a two groups of Winnebago people coming from Wisconsin. The Ojibwe prevailed in this fight with the aid of local Euro-American settlers.

In 1853 the Ojibwe and Ottawa both established large hunting camps along the Saginaw River, although Euro-American settlers were beginning to establish saw mills and farms in the area by that point.

== Geography ==
According to the U.S. Census Bureau, the county has a total area of 816 square miles (2,110 km^{2}), of which 800 square miles (2,100 km^{2}) is land and 16 square miles (41 km^{2}) (1.9%) is water. It is part of the Flint/Tri-Cities region of Mid-Michigan. The median elevation in Saginaw County, Michigan is 620 feet (190 m) above sea level.

=== Primary rivers ===
- Saginaw River
  - Shiawassee River
    - Cass River
    - Flint River
    - Bad River
  - Tittabawassee River

=== Wildlife refuge ===
- Shiawassee National Wildlife Refuge

=== Adjacent counties ===
- Bay County (northeast)
- Midland County (northwest)
- Tuscola County (east)
- Gratiot County (west)
- Genesee County (southeast)
- Shiawassee County (south)
- Clinton County (southwest)

== Demographics ==
Historical population
Census	Pop.	Note	%±
1840	892		—
1850	2,609		192.5%
1860	12,693		386.5%
1870	39,097		208.0%
1880	59,095		51.1%
1890	82,273		39.2%
1900	81,222		−1.3%
1910	89,290		9.9%
1920	100,286		12.3%
1930	120,717		20.4%
1940	130,468		8.1%
1950	153,515		17.7%
1960	190,752		24.3%
1970	219,743		15.2%
1980	228,059		3.8%
1990	211,946		−7.1%
2000	210,039		−0.9%
2010	200,169		−4.7%
2020	190,124		−5.0%
2025 (est.)	187,688	▼	−1.3%
U.S. Decennial Census; 1790–1960 1900–1990; 1990–2000 2010–2019

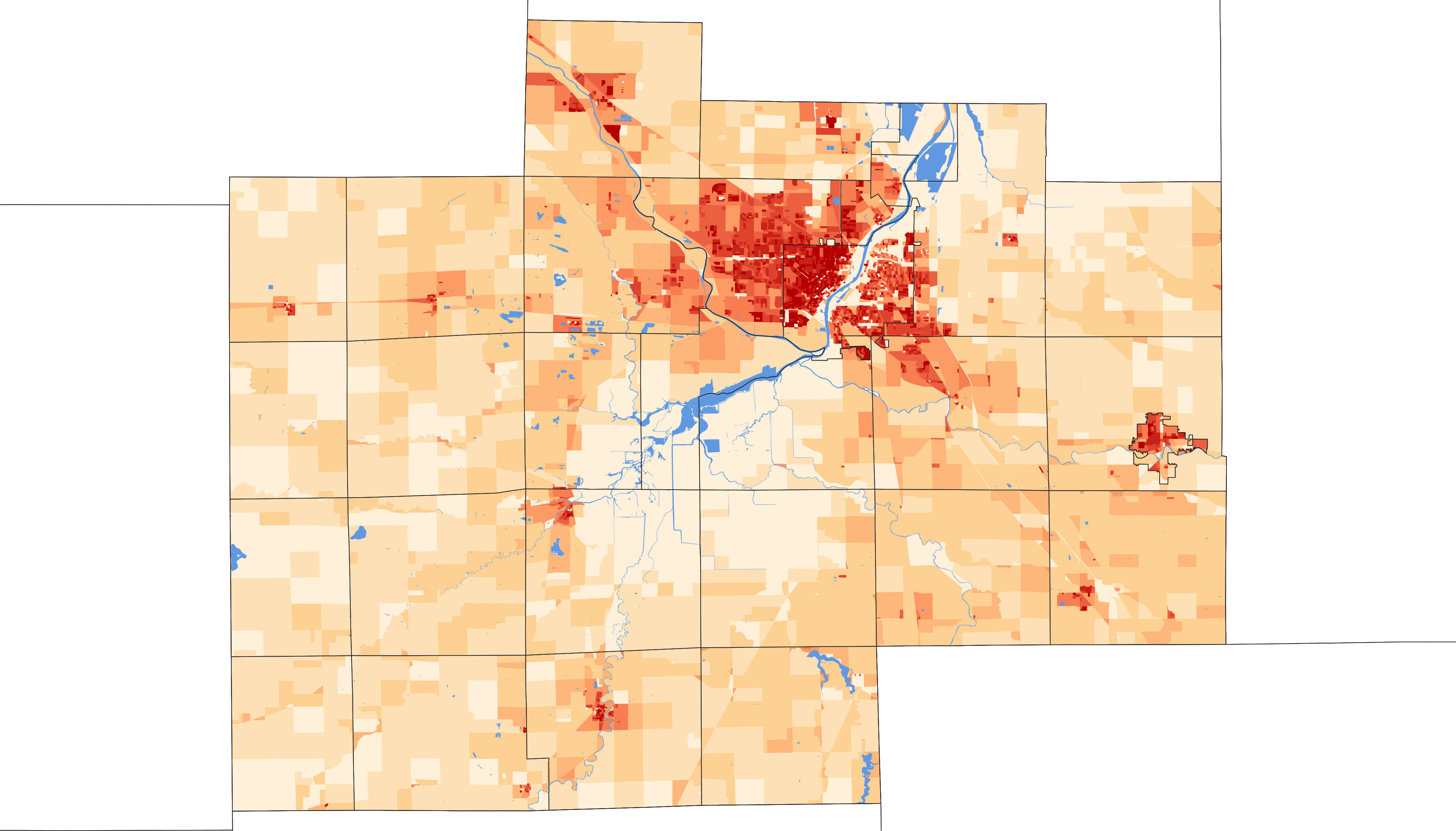
2020 population density of Saginaw County MI by census block

=== Racial and ethnic composition ===
Saginaw County, Michigan – Racial and ethnic composition Note: the US Census treats Hispanic/Latino as an ethnic category. This table excludes Latinos from the racial categories and assigns them to a separate category. Hispanics/Latinos may be of any race.
Race / Ethnicity (NH = Non-Hispanic)	Pop 1980	Pop 1990	Pop 2000	Pop 2010	Pop 2020	% 1980	% 1990	% 2000	% 2010	% 2020
White alone (NH)	177,979	160,331	151,977	141,187	128,722	78.04%	75.65%	72.36%	70.53%	67.70%
Black or African American alone (NH)	35,540	36,273	38,675	37,222	33,548	15.58%	17.11%	18.41%	18.60%	17.65%
Native American or Alaska Native alone (NH)	916	775	698	660	462	0.40%	0.37%	0.33%	0.33%	0.24%
Asian alone (NH)	811	1,226	1,648	2,067	2,373	0.36%	0.58%	0.78%	1.03%	1.25%
Native Hawaiian or Pacific Islander alone (NH)	x	x	16	55	85	x	x	0.01%	0.03%	0.04%
Other race alone (NH)	457	155	201	173	769	0.20%	0.07%	0.10%	0.09%	0.40%
Mixed race or Multiracial (NH)	x	x	2,749	3,232	7,261	x	x	1.31%	1.61%	3.82%
Hispanic or Latino (any race)	12,356	13,186	14,075	15,573	16,904	5.42%	6.22%	6.70%	7.78%	8.89%
Total	228,059	211,946	210,039	200,169	190,124	100.00%	100.00%	100.00%	100.00%	100.00%

=== 2020 census ===
As of the 2020 census, the county had a population of 190,124. The median age was 41.3 years. 21.8% of residents were under the age of 18 and 20.1% of residents were 65 years of age or older. For every 100 females there were 93.7 males, and for every 100 females age 18 and over there were 91.1 males age 18 and over.

There were 78,442 households in the county, of which 27.0% had children under the age of 18 living in them. Of all households, 41.4% were married-couple households, 19.4% were households with a male householder and no spouse or partner present, and 32.0% were households with a female householder and no spouse or partner present. About 31.7% of all households were made up of individuals and 13.9% had someone living alone who was 65 years of age or older.

There were 85,953 housing units, of which 8.7% were vacant. Among occupied housing units, 70.5% were owner-occupied and 29.5% were renter-occupied. The homeowner vacancy rate was 1.3% and the rental vacancy rate was 10.5%.

The racial makeup of the county was 70.4% White, 18.2% Black or African American, 0.4% American Indian and Alaska Native, 1.3% Asian, <0.1% Native Hawaiian and Pacific Islander, 2.9% from some other race, and 6.7% from two or more races. Hispanic or Latino residents of any race comprised 8.9% of the population.

67.4% of residents lived in urban areas, while 32.6% lived in rural areas.

=== 2010 census ===
As of the 2010 United States census, Saginaw County had a population of 200,169, a decrease of 9,870 people from the 2000 United States census. Overall, the county had a -4.7% growth rate during this ten-year period. In 2010 there were 79,011 households and 52,287 families in the county. The population density was 250.2 per square mile (96.6 per square kilometer). There were 86,844 housing units at an average density of 108.5 per square mile (41.9 per square kilometer).

The racial and ethnic makeup of the county was 70.5% White, 18.6% Black or African American, 0.3% Native American, 1.0% Asian, 7.8% Hispanic or Latino, 0.1% from other races, and 1.6% from two or more races.

There were 79,011 households, out of which 30.5% had children under the age of 18 living with them, 45.4% were husband and wife families, 16.0% had a female householder with no husband present, 33.8% were non-families, and 28.2% were made up of individuals. The average household size was 2.44 and the average family size was 2.99.

In the county, 23.4% of the population was under the age of 18, 10.6% from 18 to 24, 22.9% from 25 to 44, 27.8% from 45 to 64, and 15.3% was 65 years of age or older. The median age was 40 years. For every 100 females there were 93.6 males. For every 100 females age 18 and over, there were 90.4 males.

The 2010 American Community Survey 1-year estimate indicates the median income for a household in the county was $41,938 and the median income for a family was $52,243. Males had a median income of $27,691 versus $16,488 for females. The per capita income for the county was $21,025. About 12.4% of families and 16.9% of the population were below the poverty line, including 24.1% of those under the age 18 and 10.1% of those age 65 or over.

=== Religion ===
The Roman Catholic Diocese of Saginaw is the controlling regional body for the Catholic Church.

== Government and politics ==
The county government operates the jail, maintains rural roads, operates the major local courts, keeps files of deeds and mortgages, maintains vital records, administers public health regulations, and participates with the state in the provision of welfare and other social services. The county board of commissioners controls the budget but has only limited authority to make laws or ordinances. In Michigan, most local government functions — police and fire, building and zoning, tax assessment, street maintenance, etc. — are the responsibility of individual cities and townships.

From 1988 to 2012, Saginaw County was a consistently Democratic county at the Presidential level. However, in recent elections it has become increasingly competitive, with Donald Trump narrowly winning the county in 2016 by slightly over 1,000 votes while narrowly losing it in 2020 by about 300 votes. Trump won it back in 2024, this time by a margin of about 3,400 votes and taking an outright majority in the county too.

United States presidential election results for Saginaw County, Michigan
Year	Republican		Democratic		Third party(ies)	
Year	No.	%	No.	%	No.	%
1880	5,207	46.78%	5,304	47.65%	621	5.58%
1884	5,939	44.68%	7,047	53.02%	305	2.29%
1888	6,723	41.95%	8,923	55.68%	379	2.37%
1892	6,737	44.37%	7,601	50.07%	844	5.56%
1896	8,361	47.92%	8,792	50.39%	294	1.69%
1900	8,413	50.17%	7,610	45.38%	746	4.45%
1904	10,146	60.66%	5,330	31.86%	1,251	7.48%
1908	9,447	54.41%	7,019	40.42%	898	5.17%
1912	5,032	27.94%	5,845	32.46%	7,130	39.60%
1916	9,544	51.70%	8,434	45.69%	483	2.62%
1920	20,425	68.24%	8,494	28.38%	1,013	3.38%
1924	23,618	67.99%	6,206	17.87%	4,914	14.15%
1928	22,467	65.61%	11,555	33.75%	220	0.64%
1932	17,794	42.97%	22,643	54.67%	977	2.36%
1936	15,527	37.50%	22,592	54.56%	3,291	7.95%
1940	27,042	54.35%	22,490	45.20%	221	0.44%
1944	27,289	56.38%	20,383	42.11%	730	1.51%
1948	22,923	56.28%	16,995	41.72%	815	2.00%
1952	38,604	64.23%	20,983	34.91%	513	0.85%
1956	43,470	62.67%	25,681	37.03%	210	0.30%
1960	41,351	55.68%	32,715	44.05%	206	0.28%
1964	28,146	38.25%	45,309	61.58%	127	0.17%
1968	38,070	49.17%	32,266	41.67%	7,087	9.15%
1972	47,920	61.03%	29,424	37.47%	1,177	1.50%
1976	46,765	55.63%	36,280	43.15%	1,026	1.22%
1980	45,233	48.22%	41,650	44.40%	6,916	7.37%
1984	51,495	56.95%	38,420	42.49%	501	0.55%
1988	42,401	47.88%	45,616	51.51%	549	0.62%
1992	32,103	33.13%	43,819	45.22%	20,983	21.65%
1996	31,577	35.97%	47,579	54.19%	8,638	9.84%
2000	41,152	43.89%	50,825	54.21%	1,779	1.90%
2004	47,165	45.86%	54,887	53.37%	800	0.78%
2008	42,225	40.49%	60,276	57.80%	1,782	1.71%
2012	42,720	43.46%	54,381	55.33%	1,191	1.21%
2016	45,469	47.97%	44,396	46.84%	4,915	5.19%
2020	50,785	49.08%	51,088	49.37%	1,610	1.56%
2024	52,912	50.95%	49,515	47.68%	1,419	1.37%

United States Senate election results for Saginaw County, Michigan1
Year	Republican		Democratic		Third party(ies)	
Year	No.	%	No.	%	No.	%
2024	49,659	48.72%	49,668	48.72%	2,609	2.56%

Michigan Gubernatorial election results for Saginaw County
Year	Republican		Democratic		Third party(ies)	
Year	No.	%	No.	%	No.	%
2022	37,002	45.37%	43,219	53.00%	1,329	1.63%

=== Elected officials ===
- Prosecuting Attorney: John McColgan Jr.
- Sheriff: William Federspiel
- County Clerk: Vanessa Guerra
- County Treasurer: Timothy M. Novak
- Register of Deeds: Katheryn A. Kelly
- Public Works Commissioner: Brian Wendling

All countywide officers are elected for four-year terms. The next scheduled election for these offices is November 2024.

(information as of April 2021)

=== Parks and Recreation Commission ===
Saginaw County Parks and Recreation Commission is a county-wide government organization founded by William H. Haithco Sr. in 1969. Haithco then served as chairman from 1972 to 1999. The organization operates six parks throughout the county - Imerman Memorial Park, Veterans Memorial Park, Ringwood Forest, Price Nature Center, William H. Haithco Recreation Area, and The Saginaw Valley Rail Trail. These parks comprise over 550 acres, including 18 miles of hiking trails, two boat launches, four fishing access sites, a swimming beach, picnic shelters, and recreation programs.

== Economy ==
The largest employers in Saginaw County are:

#	Employer	# of employees
1	Nexteer Automotive	5200
2	Covenant HealthCare	4512
3	St. Mary's of Michigan	1800
4	Morley Companies	1750
5	Meijer	1425
6	Saginaw Valley State University	1071
7	Hemlock Semiconductor Corporation	1000
8	Bavarian Inn Lodge	940
9	Aleda E. Lutz Veteran Affairs Medical Center	904
10	County of Saginaw	676
11	Saginaw Public Schools	657
12	Fashion Square Mall	650
13	Saginaw Township Community Schools	621
14	Saginaw Intermediate School District	613
15	Frankenmuth Insurance	694

== Transportation ==
Saginaw County was the destination of a Sauk footpath that became one of the first roads in what is now Michigan, the Saginaw Trail. The trail, first authorized in 1819, was completed to Saginaw in 1841. Since then, Saginaw's access to the outside world has expanded with the development of maritime, rail, air, and freeway links to the major cities of Michigan and neighboring states and nations.

=== Airports ===
Scheduled airline service is available from MBS International Airport near Freeland, Michigan and Bishop International Airport in Flint, Michigan. Harry Browne Airport in Buena Vista Charter Township also serves the region.

=== Highways ===
- I-75, a major north–south freeway running from Sault Ste. Marie, Michigan to Miami-Dade County, Florida
- I-675, a business route freeway from Interstate 75 passing through downtown Saginaw
- US 23
- M-13 runs from I-69 through downtown Saginaw and north to Standish.
- M-15
- M-30
- M-46 is a cross peninsular road, running across the mitten and the thumb—from Port Sanilac on the Lake Huron shore; through Saginaw near Saginaw Bay; and then on to Muskegon on the Lake Michigan shore. This east-west surface route nearly bisects the Lower Peninsula of Michigan latitudinally.
- M-47 passes through the western suburbs and provides a direct connection to MBS International Airport in Freeland before ending at US 10 in nearby Bay County.
- M-52 runs from the Ohio border through Adrian and Owosso before ending at M-46, in the western suburbs of Saginaw. M-52 also provides an alternate connection to Lansing, Michigan's state capitol.
- M-54
- M-57
- M-58 runs from M-47 to I-675.
- M-81 runs east from M-13 to Caro and Cass City and ends at M-53 in Sanilac County.
- M-83
- M-84 runs from M-25 in downtown Bay City to M-58 in Saginaw.

=== Maritime ===
The Saginaw River is maintained by the Corps of Engineers, and from time to time, dredged to maintain a shipping channel down the river to Bay City, and from there, to the Great Lakes.

== Education ==
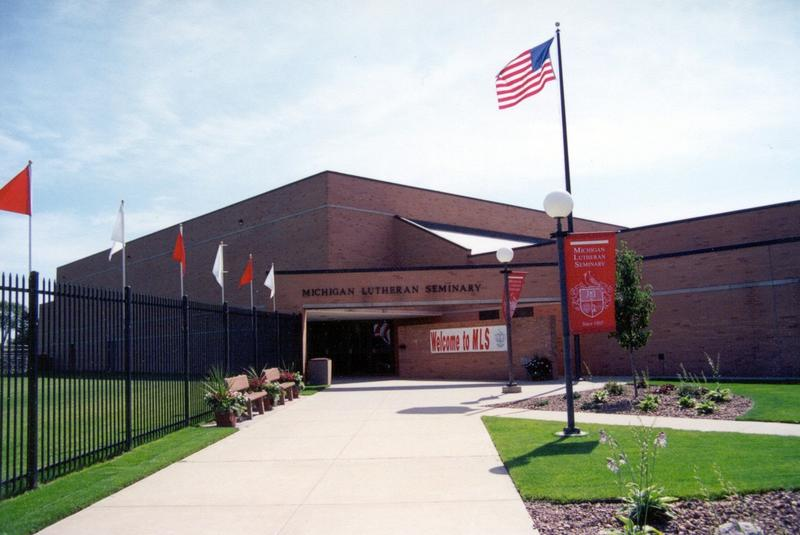
Michigan Lutheran Seminary in Saginaw

=== Primary and secondary education ===
==== Public schools ====
Most of Saginaw County is served by the Saginaw Intermediate School District (SISD), which coordinates the efforts of local boards of education, but has no operating authority over schools. Local school boards in Michigan retain great autonomy over day-to-day operations. A number of charter schools also operate in the county.

School districts in the county (including any with any territory, no matter how slight, even if the schools and/or administration are in other counties) include:

- Ashley Community Schools
- Bay City School District
- Birch Run Area Schools
- Breckenridge Community Schools
- Bridgeport-Spaulding Community School District
- Carrollton Public Schools
- Chesaning Union Schools
- Clio Area Schools
- Frankenmuth School District
- Freeland Community School District
- Hemlock Public School District
- Merrill Community Schools
- Montrose Community Schools
- New Lothrop Area Public Schools
- Ovid-Elsie Area Schools
- Reese Public School District
- Saginaw Public Schools
- Saginaw Township Community Schools
- St. Charles Community Schools
- Swan Valley School District

Former school districts include:

- Buena Vista School District

=== Higher education ===
- Saginaw Valley State University (SVSU) is a four-year state university located in eastern Kochville Township.
- Delta College is a two-year community college that serves Saginaw County, but is located in neighboring Bay County, a few miles to the north of the SVSU campus.

== Notable natives ==
- George C. Hinkley (1892–1936), Wisconsin State Assemblyman and businessman, was born in Saginaw County.
- Theodore Roethke (1908–1963) Pulitzer prize and National Book Award-winning poet, was born and buried here.

== Historical markers ==
There are twenty eight recognized historical markers in the county: They are:

- Bliss Park
- Burt Opera House / Wellington R. Burt
- Coal Mine No. 8
- The Cushway House / Benjamin Cushway and Adelaide Cushway
- First Congregational Church [Saginaw]
- Fowler Schoolhouse (Fremont Township)
- Frankenmuth / Saint Lorenz Evangelical Lutheran Church
- Frankenmuth Bavarian Inn
- Freeland United Methodist Church
- George Nason House
- Hess School
- Hoyt Library
- Leamington Stewart House
- Michigan's German Settlers
- Morseville Bridge
- Presbyterian Church of South Saginaw
- Saginaw Club
- Saginaw Oil Industry
- Saginaw Post Office
- Saginaw Valley Coal
- Saginaw Valley Lumbering Era
- St. Mary's Hospital
- Saint Michael Catholic Parish
- St. Paul's Episcopal Mission
- Shroeder House
- Theodore Roethke / Childhood Home

== Communities ==
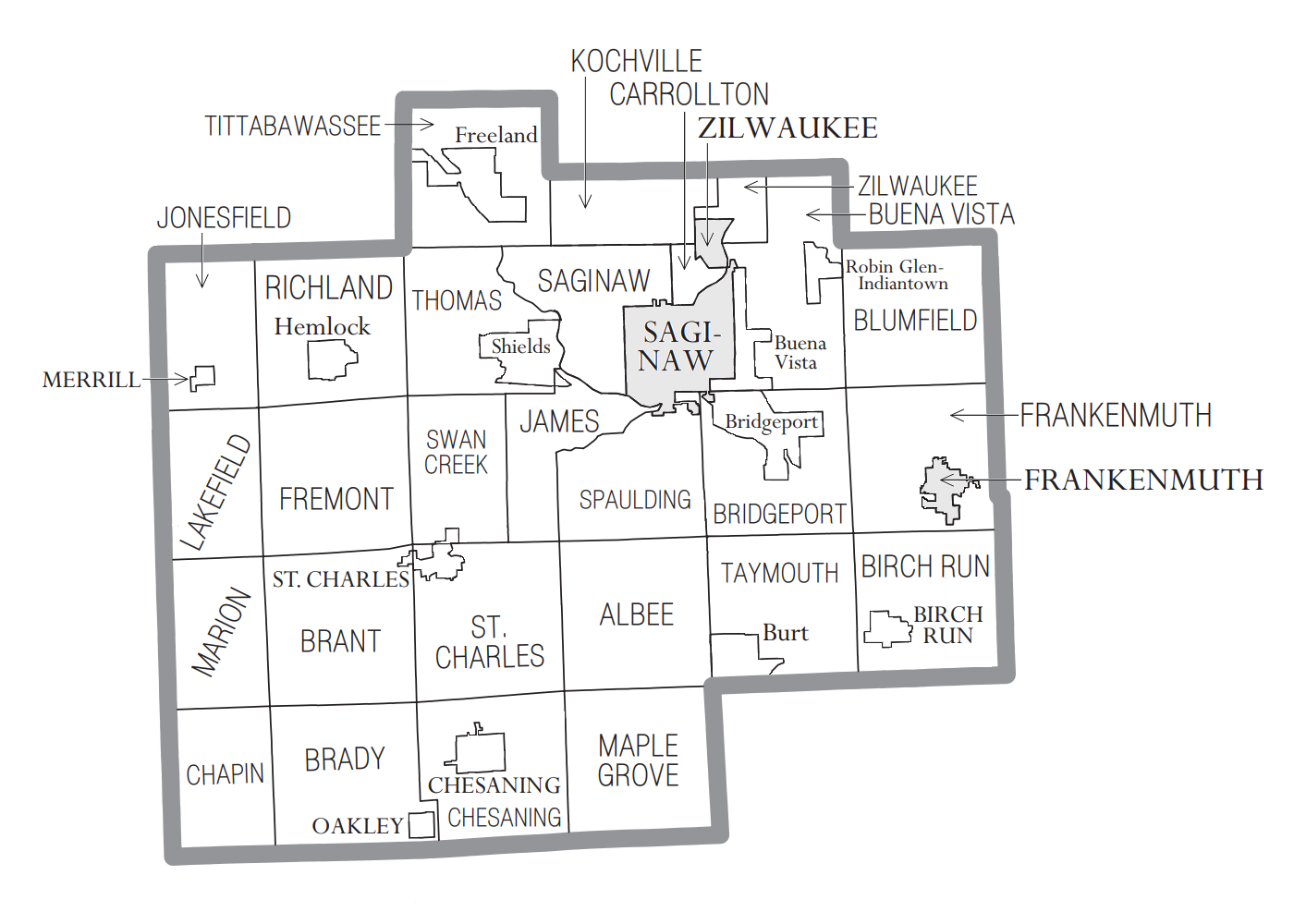
U.S. Census data map showing local municipal boundaries within Saginaw County, as well as CDP boundaries. Shaded areas represent incorporated cities.

=== Cities ===
- Frankenmuth
- Saginaw (county seat)
- Zilwaukee

=== Villages ===
- Birch Run
- Chesaning
- Merrill
- Oakley
- Reese (partially)
- St. Charles

=== Charter townships ===
- Bridgeport Charter Township
- Buena Vista Charter Township
- Saginaw Charter Township

=== Civil townships ===
- Albee Township
- Birch Run Township
- Blumfield Township
- Brady Township
- Brant Township
- Carrollton Township
- Chapin Township
- Chesaning Township
- Frankenmuth Township
- Fremont Township
- James Township
- Jonesfield Township
- Kochville Township
- Lakefield Township
- Maple Grove Township
- Marion Township
- Richland Township
- Spaulding Township
- St. Charles Township
- Swan Creek Township
- Taymouth Township
- Thomas Township
- Tittabawassee Township
- Zilwaukee Township

=== Census-designated places ===
- Bridgeport
- Buena Vista
- Burt
- Freeland
- Hemlock
- Robin Glen-Indiantown
- Saginaw Township North (former)
- Saginaw Township South (former)
- Shields

=== Other unincorporated communities ===
- Alicia
- Blumfield Corners
- Brady Center
- Brant
- Chapin
- Clausedale
- Crow Island
- Dice
- Fenmore
- Fergus
- Fordney
- Fosters
- Frankentrost
- Frost
- Galloway
- Garfield
- Gera
- Groveton
- Indiantown
- Iva
- Kochville
- Lakefield
- Lawndale
- Layton Corners
- Luce
- Marion Springs
- Morseville
- Nelson
- Orr
- Racy
- Paines
- Parshallburg
- Roosevelt
- Shattuckville
- Swan Creek
- Taymouth

== See also ==
- List of Michigan State Historic Sites in Saginaw County
- National Register of Historic Places listings in Saginaw County, Michigan
- Saginaw Trail
