= Chapin Township, Michigan =

- Civil township
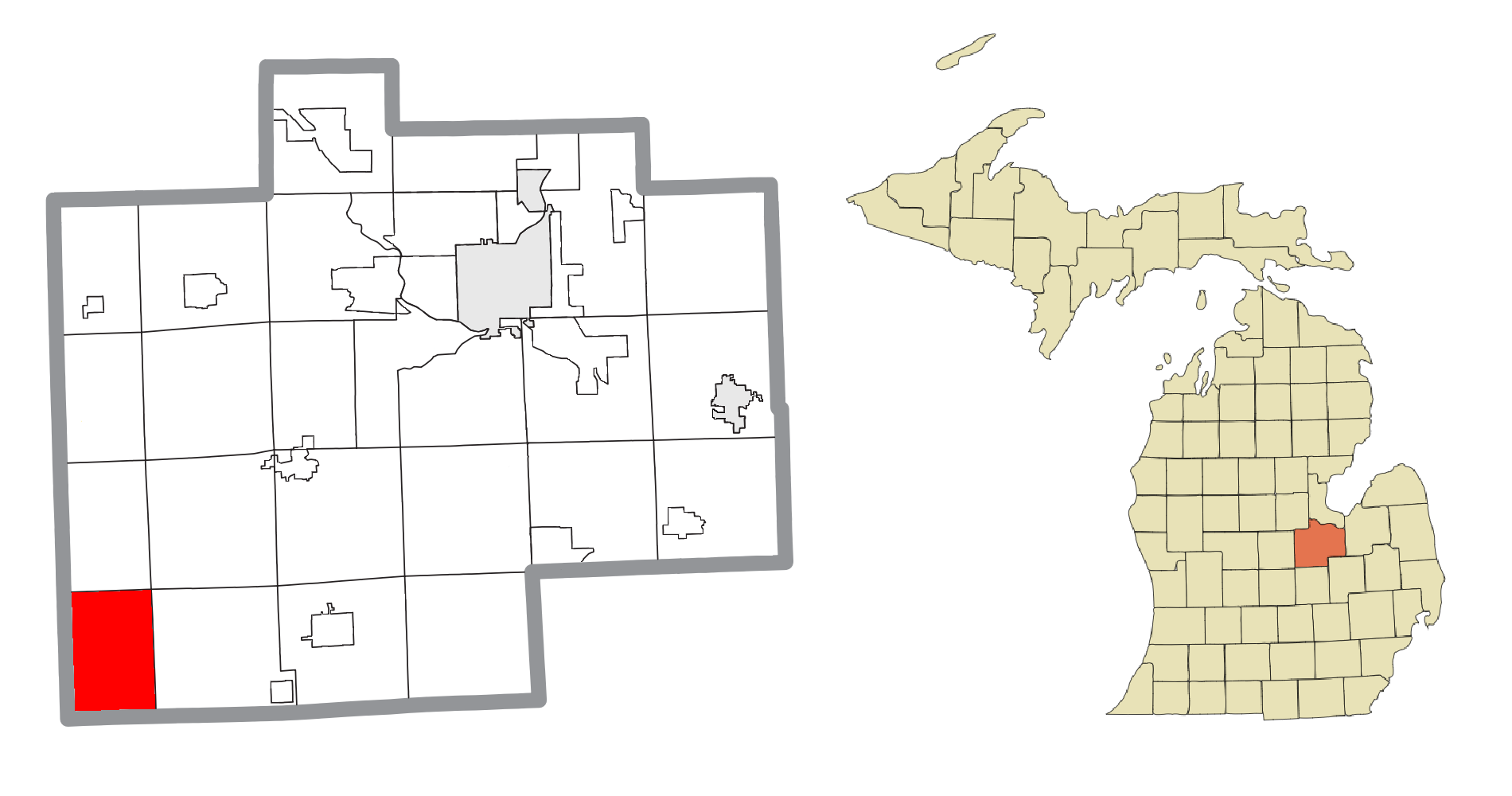
- Location within Saginaw County

- Location within the state of Michigan Chapin Township (the United States)
- Coordinates: 43°09′54″N 84°18′56″W
- Country: United States
- State: Michigan
- County: Saginaw
- Established: 1867

Area
  - Total: 24.7 sq mi (63.9 km^{2})
  - Land: 24.7 sq mi (63.9 km^{2})
  - Water: 0 sq mi (0.0 km^{2})
- Elevation: 650 ft (198 m)

Population (2020)
  - Total: 928
  - Density: 37.6/sq mi (14.5/km^{2})
- Time zone: UTC-5 (Eastern (EST))
  - Summer (DST): UTC-4 (EDT)
- ZIP code(s): 48614 (Brant); 48807 (Bannister); 48841 (Henderson)
- Area code: 989
- FIPS code: 26-14660
- GNIS feature ID: 1626058
- Website: https://www.chapintownship.com/

Chapin Township is a civil township of Saginaw County in the U.S. state of Michigan. The population was 928 at the 2020 Census.

== History ==
Chapin Township was established in 1867.

== Communities ==
- Chapin is an unincorporated community at Chapin and Ridge Road intersection. It was settled in 1855. A post office operated from June 6, 1876, until October 31, 1933.
- Fenmore is an unincorporated community in the township at Peet and Fenmore Roads. A post office operated from April 11, 1899, until October 14, 1904.
- Racy is an unincorporated community in the township at Cupp and Chapin Roads. A post office operated from September 5, 1894, until March 31, 1905.

== Geography ==
According to the United States Census Bureau, the township has a total area of 24.7 square miles (64 km^{2}), all land.

== Demographics ==
As of the census of 2000, there were 1,045 people, 378 households, and 291 families residing in the township. The population density was 42.4 inhabitants per square mile (16.4/km^{2}). There were 410 housing units at an average density of 16.6 per square mile (6.4/km^{2}). The racial makeup of the township was 97.32% White, 0.10% African American, 0.77% Native American, 0.48% from other races, and 1.34% from two or more races. Hispanic or Latino of any race were 1.82% of the population.

There were 378 households, out of which 39.9% had children under the age of 18 living with them, 62.4% were married couples living together, 9.0% had a female householder with no husband present, and 22.8% were non-families. 16.4% of all households were made up of individuals, and 5.3% had someone living alone who was 65 years of age or older. The average household size was 2.76 and the average family size was 3.07.

In the township the population was spread out, with 28.5% under the age of 18, 8.5% from 18 to 24, 33.1% from 25 to 44, 21.7% from 45 to 64, and 8.1% who were 65 years of age or older. The median age was 34 years. For every 100 females, there were 112.8 males. For every 100 females age 18 and over, there were 106.4 males.

The median income for a household in the township was $36,375, and the median income for a family was $40,625. Males had a median income of $31,250 versus $22,438 for females. The per capita income for the township was $16,599. About 9.3% of families and 13.6% of the population were below the poverty line, including 13.2% of those under age 18 and 12.3% of those age 65 or over.
