= St. Charles Township, Michigan =

Civil township in Michigan

- Civil township
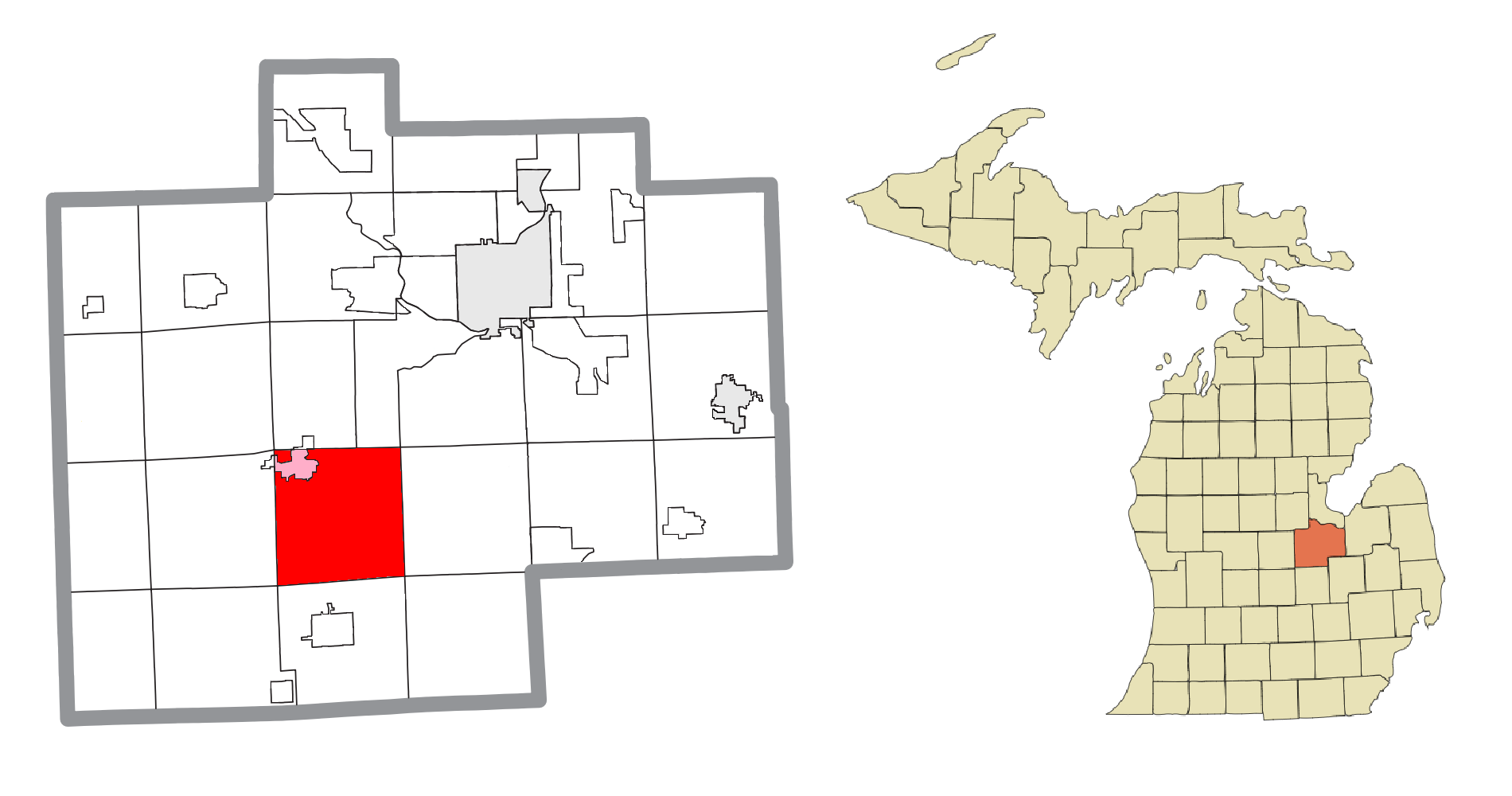
- Location within Saginaw County (red) and an administered portion of the village of St. Charles (pink)

- Location within the state of Michigan St. Charles Township (the United States)
- Coordinates: 43°16′34″N 84°07′52″W
- Country: United States
- State: Michigan
- County: Saginaw

Government
  - Supervisor: Tom Sargent
  - Clerk: Joseph Krawczyk

Area
  - Total: 37.2 sq mi (96.3 km^{2})
  - Land: 36.9 sq mi (95.7 km^{2})
  - Water: 0.23 sq mi (0.6 km^{2})
- Elevation: 590 ft (180 m)

Population (2020)
  - Total: 3,183
  - Density: 86.1/sq mi (33.3/km^{2})
- Time zone: UTC-5 (Eastern (EST))
  - Summer (DST): UTC-4 (EDT)
- ZIP code(s): 48616 (Chesaning); 48655 (St. Charles)
- Area code: 989
- FIPS code: 26-70660
- GNIS feature ID: 1627023
- Website: Official website

St. Charles Township is a civil township of Saginaw County in the U.S. state of Michigan. The population was 3,183 at the 2020 Census.

== Communities ==
- The village of St. Charles is located in the northwest corner of the township.
- Clausedale is an unincorporated community in the Township at Fry and Claudesdale Roads.
- Fergus is identified as a locale by the U.S. Geological Survey in the township at Fergus and McKeighan Roads. Fergus was a station on the Michigan Central Railroad and had a post office from December 28, 1882 to August 15, 1933.
- Groveton is an unincorporated community in the township on 4th Street between Marion and Burt Roads.
- Luce is an unincorporated community in the township at its Eastern border with Albee Township at Burt and Gasper Roads.

== Geography ==
According to the United States Census Bureau, the township has a total area of 37.2 square miles (96 km^{2}), of which 37.0 square miles (96 km^{2}) is land and 0.2 square miles (0.52 km^{2}) (0.62%) is water.

== Demographics ==
As of the census of 2000, there were 3,393 people, 1,301 households, and 965 families residing in the township. The population density was 91.8 inhabitants per square mile (35.4/km^{2}). There were 1,365 housing units at an average density of 36.9 per square mile (14.2/km^{2}). The racial makeup of the township was 96.73% White, 0.47% African American, 0.56% Native American, 0.27% Asian, 0.80% from other races, and 1.18% from two or more races. Hispanic or Latino of any race were 3.24% of the population.

There were 1,301 households, out of which 34.7% had children under the age of 18 living with them, 59.2% were married couples living together, 11.4% had a female householder with no husband present, and 25.8% were non-families. 22.8% of all households were made up of individuals, and 10.6% had someone living alone who was 65 years of age or older. The average household size was 2.60 and the average family size was 3.04.

In the township the population was spread out, with 27.1% under the age of 18, 8.0% from 18 to 24, 28.7% from 25 to 44, 23.4% from 45 to 64, and 12.8% who were 65 years of age or older. The median age was 37 years. For every 100 females, there were 95.8 males. For every 100 females age 18 and over, there were 91.9 males.

The median income for a household in the township was $40,726, and the median income for a family was $48,776. Males had a median income of $40,208 versus $23,708 for females. The per capita income for the township was $17,818. About 6.6% of families and 8.0% of the population were below the poverty line, including 12.1% of those under age 18 and 7.7% of those age 65 or over.
