= Marion Township, Saginaw County, Michigan =

Marion Township, Michigan
- Civil township
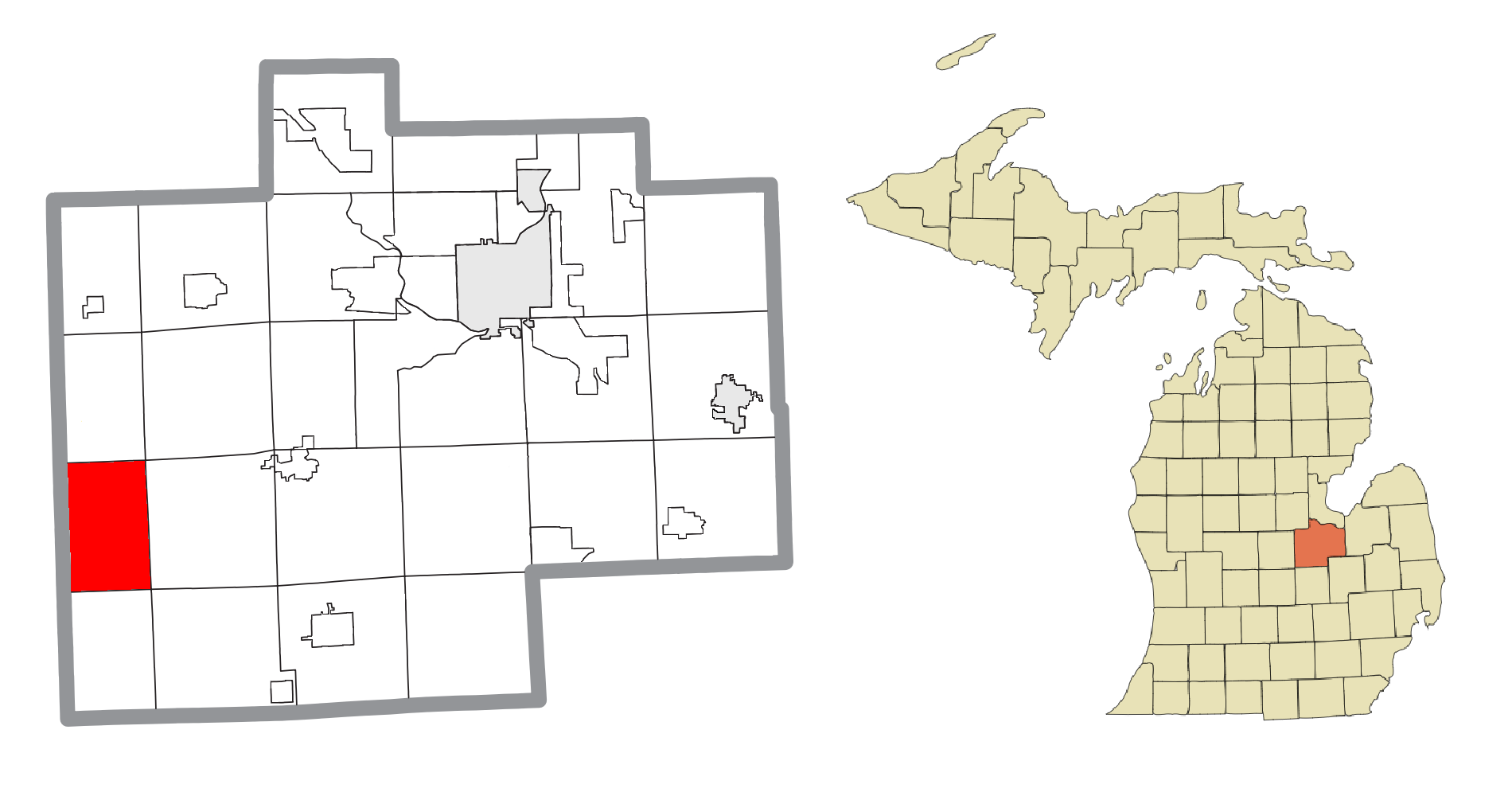
- Location within Saginaw County

- Location within the state of Michigan Marion Township (the United States)
- Coordinates: 43°15′57″N 84°19′07″W
- Country: United States
- State: Michigan
- County: Saginaw

Government
  - Supervisor: Ray Sholtz
  - Clerk: Seth Goschka

Area
  - Total: 24.6 sq mi (63.8 km^{2})
  - Land: 24.6 sq mi (63.8 km^{2})
  - Water: 0 sq mi (0.0 km^{2})
- Elevation: 653 ft (199 m)

Population (2020)
  - Total: 759
  - Density: 30.8/sq mi (11.9/km^{2})
- Time zone: UTC-5 (Eastern (EST))
  - Summer (DST): UTC-4 (EDT)
- ZIP code(s): 48614 (Brant); 48655 (St. Charles)
- Area code: 989
- FIPS code: 26-51700
- GNIS feature ID: 1626691
- Website: Official website

Marion Township is a civil township of Saginaw County in the U.S. state of Michigan. The population was 759 at the 2020 Census.

== Communities ==
- Fordney is an unincorporated community in the township at Chapin and Schroeder Roads. A post office operated from October 23, 1899, until February 28, 1903.
- Marion Springs is an unincorporated community in the township at Marion and Merrill Road. A post office operated from July 13, 1892, until August 31, 1907.

== Geography ==
According to the United States Census Bureau, the township has a total area of 24.6 square miles (64 km^{2}), all land.

== Demographics ==
As of the census of 2000, there were 925 people, 324 households, and 250 families residing in the township. The population density was 37.5 inhabitants per square mile (14.5/km^{2}). There were 348 housing units at an average density of 14.1 per square mile (5.4/km^{2}). The racial makeup of the township was 97.08% White, 0.11% African American, 1.19% Native American, 0.65% Asian, 0.11% from other races, and 0.86% from two or more races. Hispanic or Latino of any race were 1.30% of the population.

There were 324 households, out of which 41.7% had children under the age of 18 living with them, 63.3% were married couples living together, 9.6% had a female householder with no husband present, and 22.8% were non-families. 18.5% of all households were made up of individuals, and 6.8% had someone living alone who was 65 years of age or older. The average household size was 2.84 and the average family size was 3.24.

In the township the population was spread out, with 29.0% under the age of 18, 8.9% from 18 to 24, 30.8% from 25 to 44, 23.6% from 45 to 64, and 7.8% who were 65 years of age or older. The median age was 33 years. For every 100 females, there were 91.5 males. For every 100 females age 18 and over, there were 91.5 males.

The median income for a household in the township was $38,333, and the median income for a family was $40,446. Males had a median income of $38,750 versus $23,125 for females. The per capita income for the township was $16,703. About 11.8% of families and 14.3% of the population were below the poverty line, including 19.1% of those under age 18 and 13.5% of those age 65 or over.
