= Merrill, Michigan =

- Village
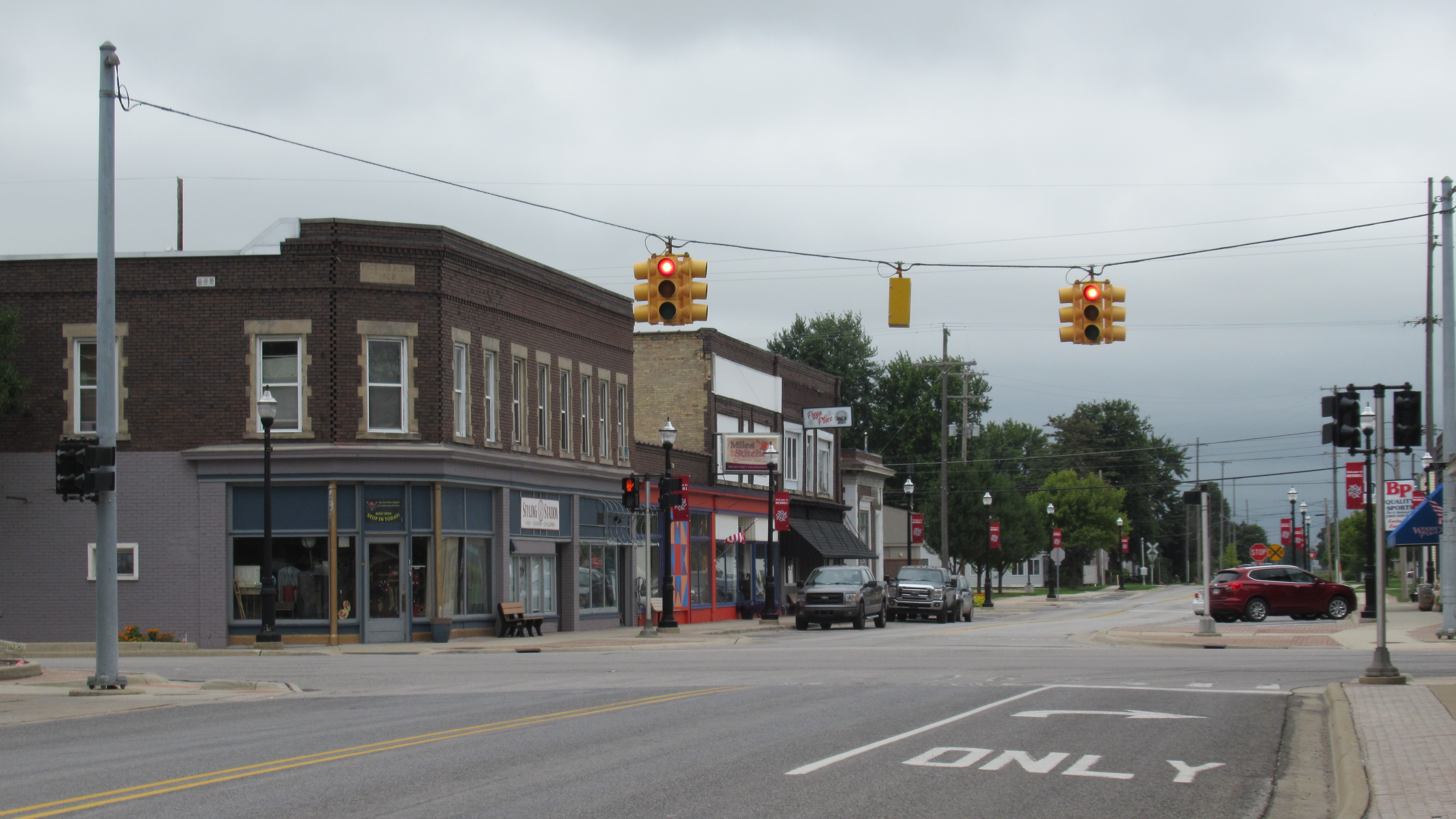
- Looking north along N. Midland Road at M-46

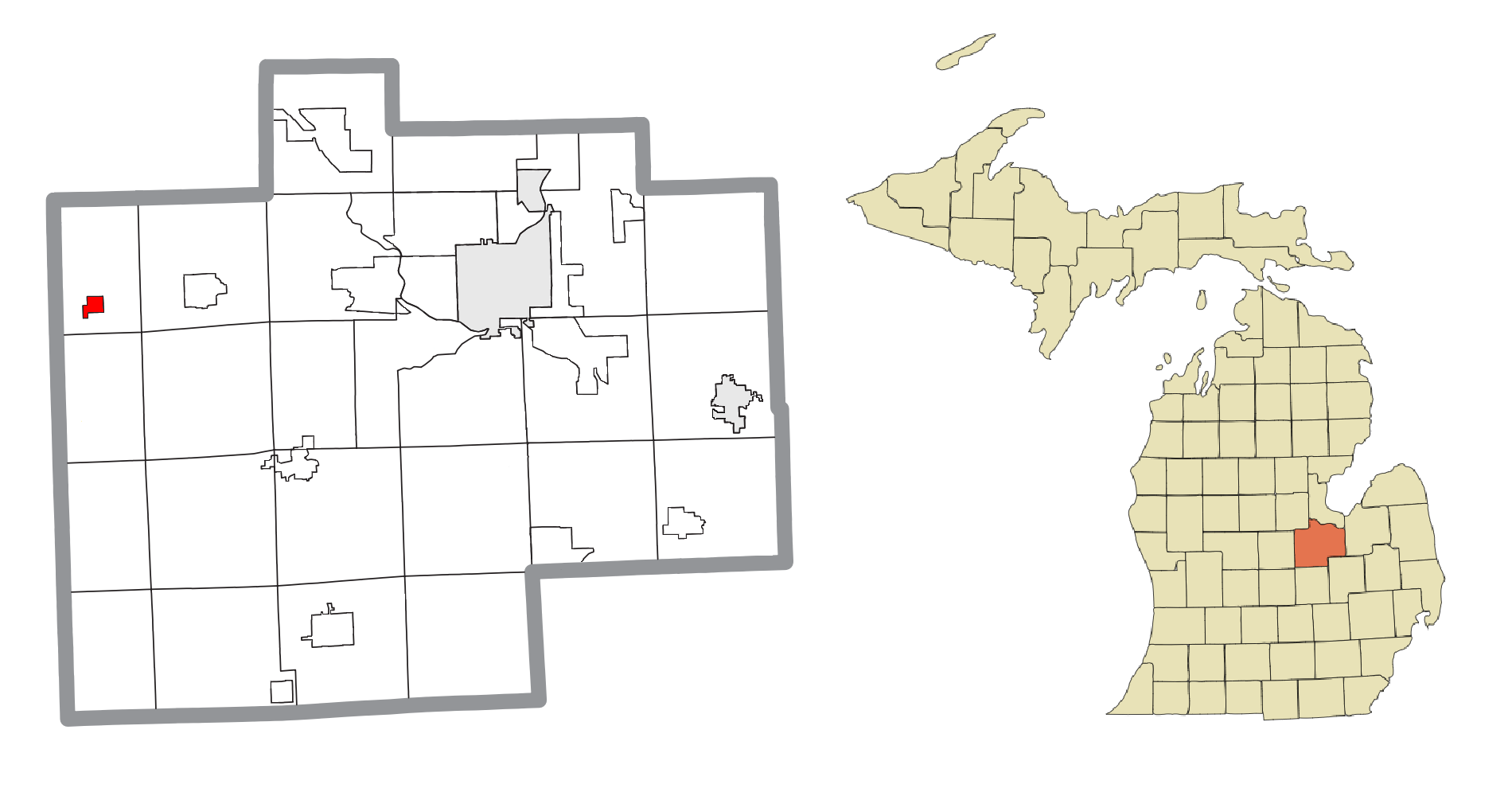
- Location within Saginaw County

- Location within the state of Michigan Location within the United States
- Coordinates: 43°24′33″N 84°20′04″W
- Country: United States
- State: Michigan
- County: Saginaw
- Township: Jonesfield
- Settled: 1872
- Incorporated: 1889

Government
  - Type: Village council
  - President: Gary Siler
  - Clerk: Janice Wazny
  - Manager: Kathleen Swarthout

Area
  - Total: 0.69 sq mi (1.79 km^{2})
  - Land: 0.69 sq mi (1.79 km^{2})
  - Water: 0 sq mi (0.00 km^{2})
- Elevation: 673 ft (205 m)

Population (2020)
  - Total: 663
  - Density: 960.87/sq mi (370.99/km^{2})
- Time zone: UTC-5 (Eastern (EST))
  - Summer (DST): UTC-4 (EDT)
- ZIP code(s): 48637
- Area code: 989
- FIPS code: 26-53180
- GNIS feature ID: 2399319
- Website: Official website

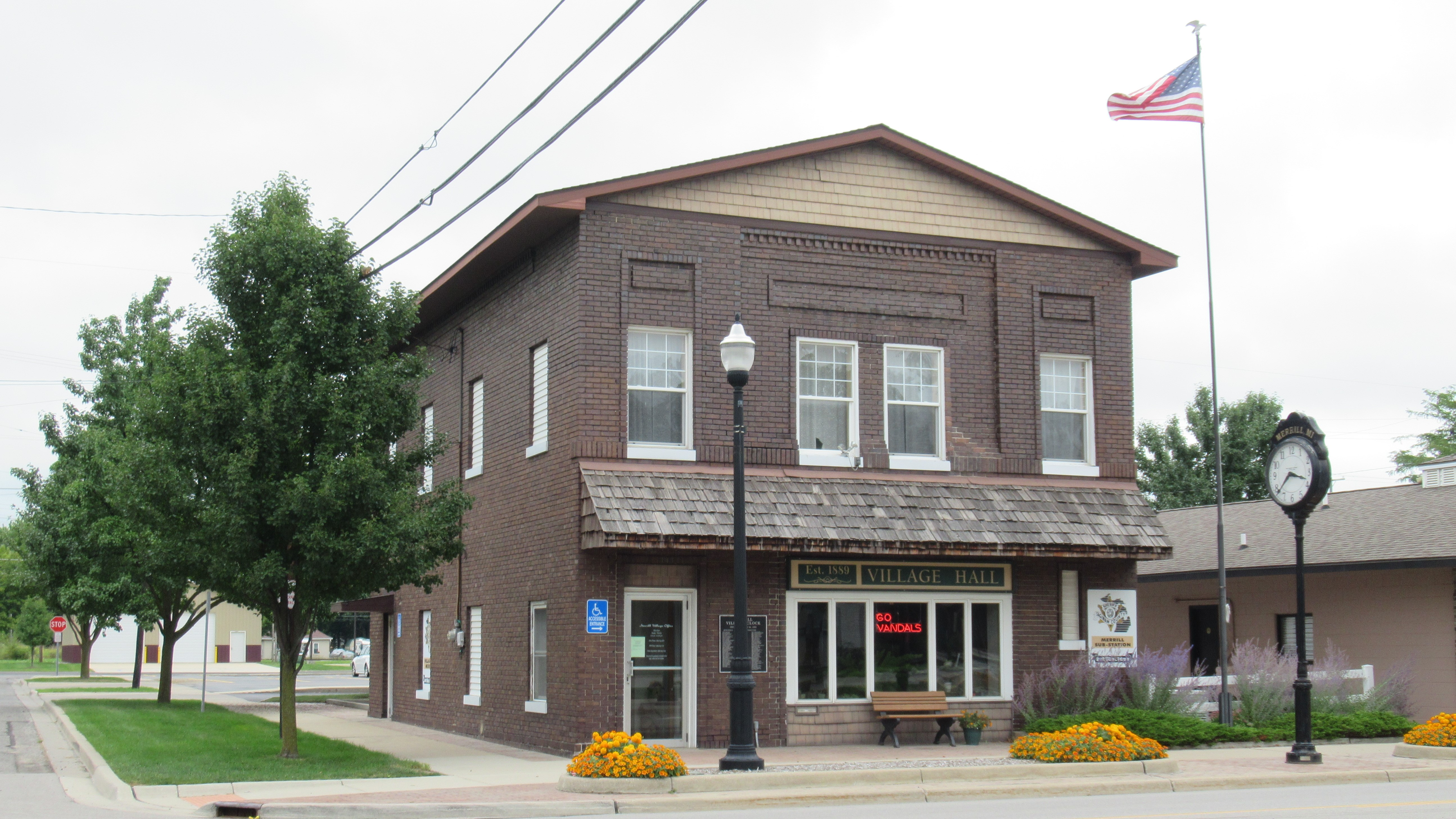
Merrill Village Hall

Merrill is a village in Saginaw County in the U.S. state of Michigan. The population was 663 at the 2020 census. The village is located within Jonesfield Township.

== History ==
The area was uninhabited until 1872 when the Saginaw Valley and St. Louis Railroad developed into the area. A local resident named Greene established a sawmill here, and a new settlement began to grow around it. A post office named Greene opened on May 21, 1875. Merchants also moved to the area and began setting up businesses along a nearby crossroad, and this site became known as Merrill by 1881. The name came from N. W. Merrill, who was a railroad worker that befriended and assisted the locals during forest fires that same year. The Greene post office was renamed Merrill on November 2, 1881. Merrill incorporated as a village in 1889.

== Geography ==
According to the U.S. Census Bureau, the village has a total area of 0.69 square miles (1.79 km^{2}), all land.

=== Major highways ===
- M-46 (Gratiot Road) runs west–east through the center of the village.

== Demographics ==
Historical population
Census	Pop.	Note	%±
1890	412		—
1900	459		11.4%
1910	505		10.0%
1920	636		25.9%
1930	616		−3.1%
1940	711		15.4%
1950	809		13.8%
1960	963		19.0%
1970	961		−0.2%
1980	851		−11.4%
1990	755		−11.3%
2000	782		3.6%
2010	778		−0.5%
2020	663		−14.8%
U.S. Decennial Census

=== 2010 census ===
As of the census of 2010, there were 778 people, 295 households, and 209 families living in the village. The population density was 1,111.4 inhabitants per square mile (429.1/km^{2}). There were 311 housing units at an average density of 444.3 per square mile (171.5/km^{2}). The racial makeup of the village was 95.0% White, 1.2% African American, 0.5% Native American, 0.3% Asian, 1.8% from other races, and 1.3% from two or more races. Hispanic or Latino of any race were 6.7% of the population.

There were 295 households, of which 35.6% had children under the age of 18 living with them, 51.2% were married couples living together, 13.9% had a female householder with no husband present, 5.8% had a male householder with no wife present, and 29.2% were non-families. 25.4% of all households were made up of individuals, and 12.6% had someone living alone who was 65 years of age or older. The average household size was 2.60 and the average family size was 3.02.

The median age in the village was 39.5 years. 24.6% of residents were under the age of 18; 9% were between the ages of 18 and 24; 23.8% were from 25 to 44; 25.6% were from 45 to 64; and 17.1% were 65 years of age or older. The gender makeup of the village was 48.3% male and 51.7% female.

=== 2000 census ===
As of the census of 2000, there were 782 people, 300 households, and 210 families living in the village. The population density was 1,141.4 inhabitants per square mile (440.7/km^{2}). There were 310 housing units at an average density of 452.5 per square mile (174.7/km^{2}). The racial makeup of the village was 96.55% White, 0.13% African American, 1.15% Native American, 1.66% from other races, and 0.51% from two or more races. Hispanic or Latino of any race were 4.09% of the population.

There were 300 households, out of which 36.0% had children under the age of 18 living with them, 55.0% were married couples living together, 11.0% had a female householder with no husband present, and 30.0% were non-families. 25.0% of all households were made up of individuals, and 11.0% had someone living alone who was 65 years of age or older. The average household size was 2.57 and the average family size was 3.03.

In the village, the population was spread out, with 26.0% under the age of 18, 8.3% from 18 to 24, 29.9% from 25 to 44, 19.3% from 45 to 64, and 16.5% who were 65 years of age or older. The median age was 37 years. For every 100 females, there were 85.3 males. For every 100 females age 18 and over, there were 79.3 males.

The median income for a household in the village was $36,167, and the median income for a family was $40,278. Males had a median income of $35,469 versus $29,028 for females. The per capita income for the village was $19,312. About 5.4% of families and 8.0% of the population were below the poverty line, including 8.8% of those under age 18 and 10.3% of those age 65 or over.
