= Brant Township, Michigan =

- Civil township
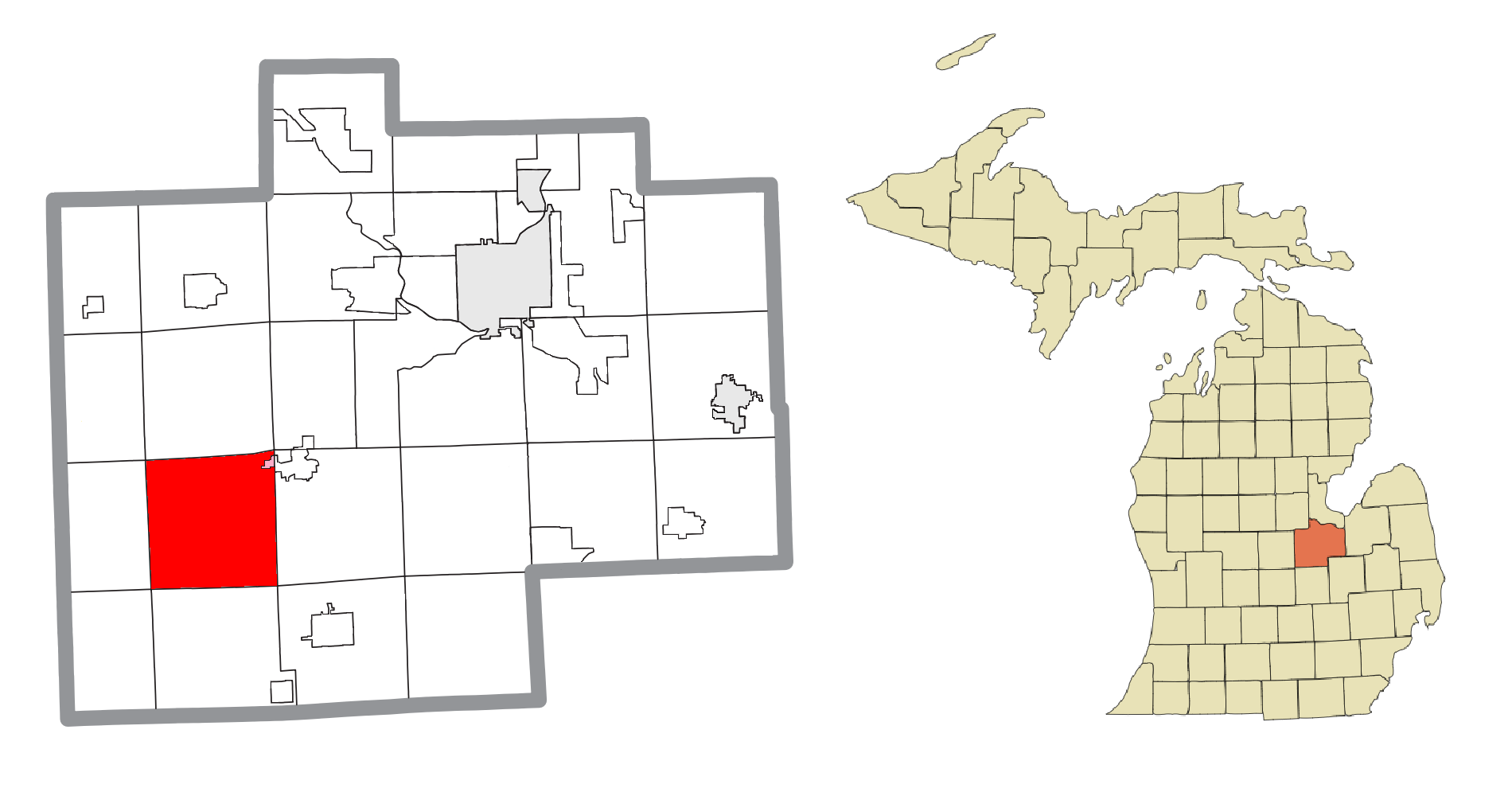
- Location within Saginaw County (red) and an administered portion of the village of St. Charles (pink)

- Location within the state of Michigan Brant Township (the United States)
- Coordinates: 43°15′42″N 84°13′12″W
- Country: United States
- State: Michigan
- County: Saginaw
- Established: 1858

Government
  - Supervisor: Robert Fowler

Area
  - Total: 37.1 sq mi (96.0 km^{2})
  - Land: 37.1 sq mi (96.0 km^{2})
  - Water: 0 sq mi (0.0 km^{2})
- Elevation: 614 ft (187 m)

Population (2020)
  - Total: 1,842
  - Density: 49.7/sq mi (19.2/km^{2})
- Time zone: UTC-5 (Eastern (EST))
  - Summer (DST): UTC-4 (EDT)
- ZIP code(s): 48614 (Brant); 48616 (Chesaning); 48655 (St. Charles)
- Area code: 989
- FIPS code: 26-10100
- GNIS feature ID: 1625972
- Website: https://www.branttownship.com/

Brant Township is a civil township of Saginaw County in the U.S. state of Michigan. As of the 2020 Census, the township population was 1,842.

== History ==
Brant Township was organized in 1858. Thomas Berry was elected the first supervisor that year.

== Communities ==
- Brant is an unincorporated community in the township at the intersection of Brant and Hemlock Roads at 43°15′33″N 84°13′47″W. The Brant post office, with ZIP code 48614, opened March 17, 1884, The office serves the western portions of Brant Township as well as most of Marion Township, and small areas of Chapin Township to the south of Marion and Hamilton Township to the west of Marion in Gratiot County.
- Chesaning Township is to the southeast, and the Chesaning post office, with ZIP code 48616, also serves the southern part of Brant Township.
- The village of St. Charles is adjacent to the northeast, and incorporates some land from the township. The St. Charles post office, with ZIP code 48655, also serves northern and eastern Brant Township.

== Geography ==
According to the United States Census Bureau, the township has a total area of 37.1 square miles (96 km^{2}), of which 37.1 square miles (96 km^{2}) is land and 0.03% is water.

== Demographics ==
As of the census of 2000, there were 2,023 people, 701 households, and 567 families residing in the township. The population density was 54.6 inhabitants per square mile (21.1/km^{2}). There were 734 housing units at an average density of 19.8 per square mile (7.6/km^{2}). The racial makeup of the township was 97.73% White, 0.10% African American, 0.40% Native American, 0.05% Asian, 0.79% from other races, and 0.94% from two or more races. Hispanic or Latino of any race were 1.88% of the population.

There were 701 households, out of which 37.9% had children under the age of 18 living with them, 70.8% were married couples living together, 6.3% had a female householder with no husband present, and 19.1% were non-families. 15.1% of all households were made up of individuals, and 4.7% had someone living alone who was 65 years of age or older. The average household size was 2.87 and the average family size was 3.17.

In the township the population was spread out, with 28.2% under the age of 18, 7.2% from 18 to 24, 30.0% from 25 to 44, 25.4% from 45 to 64, and 9.2% who were 65 years of age or older. The median age was 37 years. For every 100 females, there were 99.7 males. For every 100 females age 18 and over, there were 101.8 males.

The median income for a household in the township was $46,157, and the median income for a family was $49,438. Males had a median income of $42,167 versus $23,929 for females. The per capita income for the township was $19,400. About 7.0% of families and 8.3% of the population were below the poverty line, including 10.4% of those under age 18 and 7.9% of those age 65 or over.
