= Swan Creek Township, Michigan =

- Civil township
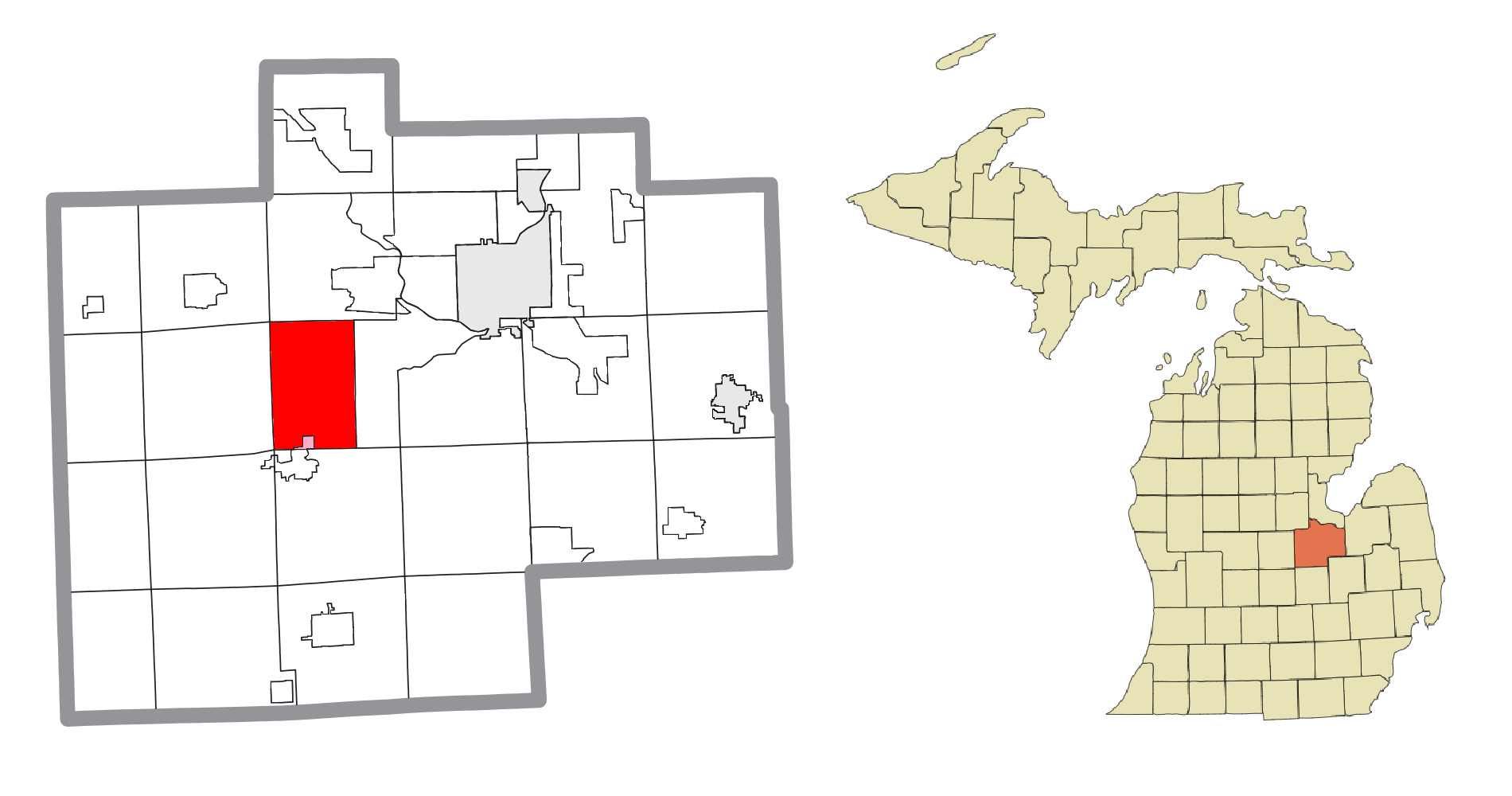
- Location within Saginaw County (red) and an administered portion of the village of St. Charles (pink)
- Coordinates: 43°21′17″N 84°07′34″W
- Country: United States
- State: Michigan
- County: Saginaw
- Organized: 1860

Government
  - Supervisor: Phillip Schilling
  - Clerk: Tim Krzeszewski

Area
  - Total: 23.6 sq mi (61.2 km^{2})
  - Land: 23.2 sq mi (60.0 km^{2})
  - Water: 0.46 sq mi (1.2 km^{2})
- Elevation: 587 ft (179 m)

Population (2020)
  - Total: 2,416
  - Density: 104/sq mi (40.3/km^{2})
- Time zone: UTC-5 (Eastern (EST))
  - Summer (DST): UTC-4 (EDT)
- ZIP code(s): 48609 (Saginaw); 48626 (Hemlock); 48655 (St. Charles)
- Area code: 989
- FIPS code: 26-77660
- GNIS feature ID: 1627144
- Website: Official website

Swan Creek Township is a civil township of Saginaw County in the U.S. state of Michigan. The population was 2,416 at the 2020 Census.

== Communities ==
- Garfield is an unincorporated community near the center of the township at Lakefield and Teft Roads (43°21′05″N 84°08′02″W). Garfield began as a logging settlement in about 1870 with the mills of L. Pennoyer and R. H. Nason. In 1879, Nason, along with Helen B. Allen and W. Husen, also built a salt block here. It was a station on the Michigan Central Railroad, and was named for the nearby Garfield coal mine.
- Orr is an unincorporated community in the township at Swan Creek and Orr Roads. A post office operated from July 7, 1896, until October 14, 1904
- Swan Creek is an unincorporated community on the border with James Township at Swan Creek and Van Wormer Roads. A post office operated from July 15, 1869, until October 16, 1871, and from October 20, 1892, until September 15, 1927.

== Geography ==
According to the United States Census Bureau, the township has a total area of 23.6 square miles (61 km^{2}), of which 23.2 square miles (60 km^{2}) is land and 0.5 square miles (1.3 km^{2}) (1.95%) is water.

== Demographics ==
As of the census of 2000, there were 2,536 people, 957 households, and 756 families residing in the township. The population density was 109.5 inhabitants per square mile (42.3/km^{2}). There were 984 housing units at an average density of 42.5 per square mile (16.4/km^{2}). The racial makeup of the township was 97.71% White, 0.16% African American, 0.47% Native American, 0.04% Asian, 0.43% from other races, and 1.18% from two or more races. Hispanic or Latino of any race were 2.33% of the population.

There were 957 households, out of which 33.5% had children under the age of 18 living with them, 69.6% were married couples living together, 6.3% had a female householder with no husband present, and 20.9% were non-families. 18.7% of all households were made up of individuals, and 8.5% had someone living alone who was 65 years of age or older. The average household size was 2.64 and the average family size was 3.01.

In the township the population was spread out, with 24.3% under the age of 18, 7.0% from 18 to 24, 28.7% from 25 to 44, 27.9% from 45 to 64, and 12.0% who were 65 years of age or older. The median age was 40 years. For every 100 females, there were 102.4 males. For every 100 females age 18 and over, there were 100.3 males.

The median income for a household in the township was $45,887, and the median income for a family was $51,157. Males had a median income of $41,953 versus $24,125 for females. The per capita income for the township was $23,129. About 4.3% of families and 4.3% of the population were below the poverty line, including 4.4% of those under age 18 and 3.8% of those age 65 or over.
