= St. Charles, Michigan =

- Village
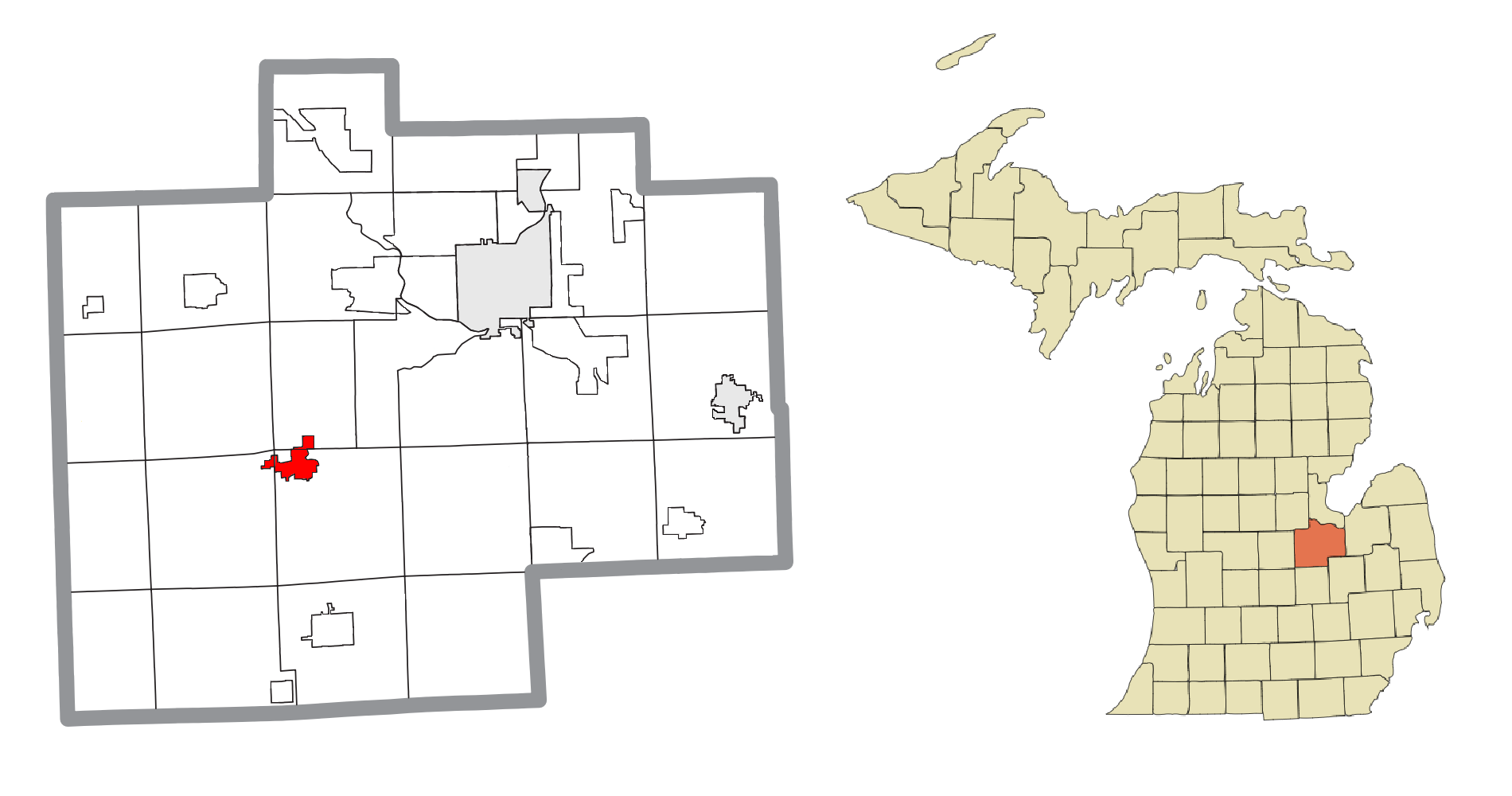
- Location within Saginaw County

- Location within the state of Michigan
- Coordinates: 43°17′56″N 84°08′51″W
- Country: United States
- State: Michigan
- County: Saginaw
- Townships: Brant, St. Charles, and Swan Creek

Government
  - Type: Village council
  - President: Neil Woodgate

Area
  - Total: 2.17 sq mi (5.62 km^{2})
  - Land: 2.09 sq mi (5.42 km^{2})
  - Water: 0.077 sq mi (0.20 km^{2})
- Elevation: 604 ft (184 m)

Population (2020)
  - Total: 1,992
  - Density: 951.8/sq mi (367.48/km^{2})
- Time zone: UTC-5 (Eastern (EST))
  - Summer (DST): UTC-4 (EDT)
- ZIP code(s): 48655
- Area code: 989
- FIPS code: 26-70640
- GNIS feature ID: 2399159
- Website: Official website

St. Charles is a village in Saginaw County in the U.S. state of Michigan. The village is located in the northwest corner of St. Charles Township with portions of the village located within Brant and Swan Creek townships. As of the 2020 census, St. Charles had a population of 1,992.

== Geography ==
According to the United States Census Bureau, the village has a total area of 2.20 square miles (5.70 km^{2}), of which 2.12 square miles (5.49 km^{2}) is land and 0.08 square miles (0.21 km^{2}) is water. The Bad River flows through St. Charles.

== Demographics ==
Historical population
Census	Pop.	Note	%±
1900	1,317		—
1910	1,451		10.2%
1920	1,469		1.2%
1930	1,463		−0.4%
1940	1,300		−11.1%
1950	1,469		13.0%
1960	1,959		33.4%
1970	2,046		4.4%
1980	2,276		11.2%
1990	2,144		−5.8%
2000	2,215		3.3%
2010	2,054		−7.3%
2020	1,992		−3.0%
U.S. Decennial Census

=== Income and poverty ===
The median income for a household in the village was $50,183.

=== 2020 census ===
As of the 2020 census, St. Charles had a population of 1,992. The median age was 42.1 years. 21.5% of residents were under the age of 18 and 19.8% of residents were 65 years of age or older. For every 100 females there were 91.7 males, and for every 100 females age 18 and over there were 92.7 males age 18 and over.

0.0% of residents lived in urban areas, while 100.0% lived in rural areas.

There were 820 households in St. Charles, of which 28.5% had children under the age of 18 living in them. Of all households, 40.7% were married-couple households, 21.6% were households with a male householder and no spouse or partner present, and 29.6% were households with a female householder and no spouse or partner present. About 31.7% of all households were made up of individuals and 12.0% had someone living alone who was 65 years of age or older.

There were 890 housing units, of which 7.9% were vacant. The homeowner vacancy rate was 1.5% and the rental vacancy rate was 3.6%.

Racial composition as of the 2020 census
Race	Number	Percent
White	1,820	91.4%
Black or African American	12	0.6%
American Indian and Alaska Native	11	0.6%
Asian	2	0.1%
Native Hawaiian and Other Pacific Islander	1	0.1%
Some other race	20	1.0%
Two or more races	126	6.3%
Hispanic or Latino (of any race)	108	5.4%

=== 2010 census ===
As of the census of 2010, there were 2,054 people, 864 households, and 550 families living in the village. The population density was 968.9 inhabitants per square mile (374.1/km^{2}). There were 928 housing units at an average density of 437.7 per square mile (169.0/km^{2}). The racial makeup of the village was 97.0% White, 0.9% African American, 0.7% Native American, 0.1% Asian, 0.2% from other races, and 1.1% from two or more races. Hispanic or Latino of any race were 5.2% of the population.

There were 864 households, of which 30.6% had children under the age of 18 living with them, 43.4% were married couples living together, 14.9% had a female householder with no husband present, 5.3% had a male householder with no wife present, and 36.3% were non-families. 30.6% of all households were made up of individuals, and 14.5% had someone living alone who was 65 years of age or older. The average household size was 2.36 and the average family size was 2.93.

The median age in the village was 38.7 years. 24.1% of residents were under the age of 18; 9.3% were between the ages of 18 and 24; 23.9% were from 25 to 44; 26.7% were from 45 to 64; and 16.1% were 65 years of age or older. The gender makeup of the village was 48.4% male and 51.6% female.

=== 2000 census ===
As of the census of 2000, there were 2,215 people, 865 households, and 615 families living in the village. The population density was 907.4 inhabitants per square mile (350.3/km^{2}). There were 909 housing units at an average density of 372.4 per square mile (143.8/km^{2}). The racial makeup of the village was 96.57% White, 0.68% African American, 0.63% Native American, 0.14% Asian, 0.99% from other races, and 0.99% from two or more races. Hispanic or Latino of any race were 3.34% of the population.

There were 865 households, out of which 34.2% had children under the age of 18 living with them, 53.2% were married couples living together, 13.6% had a female householder with no husband present, and 28.9% were non-families. 25.1% of all households were made up of individuals, and 11.3% had someone living alone who was 65 years of age or older. The average household size was 2.55 and the average family size was 3.03.

In the village, the population was spread out, with 27.2% under the age of 18, 8.8% from 18 to 24, 27.9% from 25 to 44, 21.8% from 45 to 64, and 14.3% who were 65 years of age or older. The median age was 36 years. For every 100 females, there were 93.6 males. For every 100 females age 18 and over, there were 88.9 males.

== Climate ==
This climatic region is typified by large seasonal temperature differences, with warm to hot (and often humid) summers and cold (sometimes severely cold) winters. According to the Köppen Climate Classification system, St. Charles has a humid continental climate, abbreviated "Dfb" on climate maps.
