= M-47 (Michigan highway) =

State highway in Saginaw and Bay counties in Michigan, United States

M-47
- M-47 highlighted in red

Route information
- Maintained by MDOT
- Length: 14.328 mi (23.059 km)
- Existed: c. July 1, 1919–present

Major junctions
- South end: M-46 near Shields
- M-58 near Saginaw
- North end: US 10 near Midland

Location
- Country: United States
- State: Michigan
- Counties: Saginaw, Bay

Highway system
- Michigan State Trunkline Highway System; Interstate; US; State; Byways
← M-46	→ M-48
← M-110	M-111	→ US 112

M-47 is a north–south state trunkline highway in the US state of Michigan. It runs near Saginaw and Midland in the Tri-Cities area of the Lower Peninsula. The highway runs through suburban and agricultural areas to connect the two cities with the airport in the area. The northernmost section of M-47 runs along a freeway to the terminus at US Highway 10 (US 10). M-47 runs for 14.328 miles (23.059 km), all of which has been listed as a part of the National Highway System.

First designated by July 1, 1919, along a different routing, M-47 was extended several times in both directions through the 1920s and 1930s. Two of these extensions replaced sections of M-111 in the Bay City area. At the apex of its length in the 1950s, M-47 stretched from Webberville in the south to Bay City State Park in the north. Since Interstate 75 (I-75) opened in the Tri-Cities area, the northern section of M-47 was rerouted and truncated as a result of related changes to other highways. The southern end was moved after I-96 opened in the Lansing area. Further changes into the 1970s shortened M-47 more, producing the routing in use today.

== Route description ==
M-47 starts at M-46 (Gratiot Road) east of Shields next to the Oakwood Cemetery. M-47 is known as Midland Road as it runs slightly northwest to intersect with M-58 (State Road) in Saginaw Charter Township running parallel to the Tittabawassee River. This area is the western edge of Saginaw's suburbs. Along the road towards Freeland, there are periodic small farms in between small residential subdivisions. In the community of Freeland, M-47 runs near the MBS International Airport off Freeland Road. North of town, M-47 leaves Midland Road and becomes a freeway near Tittabawassee Park. The freeway section of M-47 runs through rural farm land. There is a diamond interchange with Salzburg Road before the terminal interchange at US 10.

As part of its maintenance duties, the Michigan Department of Transportation (MDOT) tracks the volume of traffic on the highways it maintains. This number is expressed in terms of annual average daily traffic (AADT), a calculation of the average traffic for a segment of roadway on any average day of the year. In 2009, the department measured a peak of 19,719 vehicles daily on the stretch north of Tittabawassee Road. The section south of the US 10 interchange had the lowest traffic level at 9,315 vehicles AADT. Additionally, the entire route of M-47 has been listed on the National Highway System, a network of roads important to the country's economy, defense, and mobility.

== History ==
The original designation of M-47 was routed from the Shiawassee–Ingham county line north to St. Charles and then east along M-46 into Saginaw. A southern extension into Ingham County to end at M-16 in Williamston was transferred and completed in 1924. A northern extension to Bay City replaced a section of M-111 in 1929, and extended farther to Bay City State Park in 1933. M-47 replaced the remainder of M-111 and extended southward from the park to Bay City in 1938, creating a "U-turn" in the routing. The southern terminus was moved again in late 1951 or early 1952 to Webberville, although still ending on US 16.

At its greatest extent in the 1950s, the highway extended north from Webberville through Owosso and St. Charles to a junction with M-46 between Hemlock and Shields. M-47 turned east along M-46, running concurrently with that highway to Saginaw Township. There M-47 turned north independently to a junction with US 10, and then ran concurrently with US 10 into Saginaw. Once in the city, M-47 turned north along Bay Street out of town toward Bay City. M-47 joined US 23 and followed it north of town. M-47 then ran separately to the state park before turning south and back into downtown Bay City, ending at the US 23 business loop.

Major changes to the routing of M-47 started in December 1960 when the I-75/US 10/US 23 freeway opened between Saginaw and Bay City. US 10 was rerouted east of Midland to Bay City along the M-20 freeway. M-47 was rerouted along the former US 10 from Saginaw to east of Midland, and a new two-lane bypass was built north of Freeland, ending at the US 10 freeway. The relocation of M-47 was intended to bypass the former US 10 routing between Freeland and Midland, which at the time had a high accident rate due to heavy traffic and a number of curves. MDOT officials also thought the relocation would alleviate traffic at the Dow Chemical Company plant southeast of Midland, and also built the interchange with US 10 in such a way that it could accommodate a northerly expansion. Also in 1960, M-81 was extended over State Street in Saginaw, and the former routing of M-47 between Saginaw and Bay City was redesignated as M-84. M-13 also replaced the former US 23/M-47 when US 23 was moved to freeways as well. The southern end of M-47 was changed in 1962 with the completion of I-96 in the Lansing area. US 16 was replaced by M-43, and the southern terminus of M-47 was moved to exit 122 along I-96.

Construction begun in 1965 and completed in November 1966 expanded the bypass east of Midland from a two-lane road to an expressway by adding two southbound lanes. This expansion also replaced the intersections of Hotchkiss and Salzburg roads with overpasses, along with a diamond interchange at the latter. Coinciding with this expansion, M-47 was widened from two to five lanes between the southern terminus of the expressway portion southerly to State Street near Saginaw in the same timespan. The segment of M-47 south of M-46 became an extension of M-52 in 1969, truncating M-47 to Hemlock. In 1970, M-47 was truncated to its current routing, resulting in the elimination of the M-46/M-47 concurrency near Shields. In the end, only about a mile and a half (2.4 km) of roadway still bears the M-47 from before the changes made starting in 1960, along a section of road that was not originally part of the highway in 1919.

In June 2014, a construction project began on the interchange with US 10 at the route's northern terminus. This construction consisted of bridge replacement over US 10, as well as a new ramp connecting northbound M-47 to westbound US 10 that, unlike the old ramp, does not conflict with westbound traffic exiting onto southbound M-47.

=== M-111 ===
M-111
- Location: Bay County
- Length: 5.1 mi (8.2 km)
- Existed: 1928–1938

In 1928, M-111 was assigned to a route connecting M-13 (later signed as US 23 for a time) north of Bay City to Bay City State Park on Saginaw Bay. The original route consisted of what is today Euclid Avenue. In the early 1930s, a return leg towards Bay City was added to the east of the original route along what is now State Park Road, giving the route an upside-down-U shape. In 1933, the western leg along Euclid Avenue from Midland Road to Beaver Road was designated as M-47. In 1938, all of M-111 was re-designated as M-47—thus making M-47 double back to Bay City.

== Major intersections ==
All exits are unnumbered.

County	Location	mi	km	Destinations	Notes
Saginaw	Saginaw Township	0.000	0.000	M-46 (Gratiot Road) – Saginaw, St. Louis	
Saginaw	Saginaw Township	1.546	2.488	M-58 east (State Road) – Saginaw	Western terminus of M-58
Saginaw	Tittabawassee Township	10.023	16.130	Midland Road	Southern end of freeway
Bay	Williams Township	13.258	21.337	Salzburg Road	Interchange
Bay	Williams Township	14.328	23.059	US 10 – Midland, Bay City	Interchange; exit 130 on US 10
1.000 mi = 1.609 km; 1.000 km = 0.621 mi
