= Interstate 675 (Michigan) =

Interstate Highway in Saginaw County, Michigan, United States

Interstate 675
- I-675 highlighted in red

Route information
- Auxiliary route of I-75
- Maintained by MDOT
- Length: 7.728 mi (12.437 km)
- Existed: October 21, 1971–present
- NHS: Entire route

Major junctions
- South end: I-75 / US 23 near Saginaw
- M-58 in Saginaw
- North end: I-75 / US 23 in Zilwaukee

Location
- Country: United States
- State: Michigan
- Counties: Saginaw

Highway system
- Interstate Highway System; Main; Auxiliary; Suffixed; Business; Future; Michigan State Trunkline Highway System; Interstate; US; State; Byways
← M-553	→ I-696

Interstate 675 (I-675) is an auxiliary Interstate Highway in the US state of Michigan. The freeway is a 7.7-mile-long (12.4 km) loop route through downtown Saginaw, as I-75 passes on the east side of the city. I-675 is also a state trunkline highway that provided a bypass of the former drawbridge carrying I-75 and US Highway 23 (US 23) across the Saginaw River. Construction of I-675 started in 1969 and the freeway opened in 1971. Since then, sections near downtown were reconstructed between 2009 and 2011 to update one of the freeway's interchanges and rebuild the bridge over the Saginaw River.

== Route description ==
Splitting from I-75/US 23 on the eastern side of Saginaw, I-675 turns west toward downtown. The freeway runs between residential neighborhoods and has an interchange with Veterans Memorial Parkway. West of that interchange, it crosses a line of the Huron and Eastern Railway. From there, it runs on the northern edge of downtown near the Dow Event Center, spanning the Saginaw River on the Henry G. Marsh Bridge. On the west side of the river, the trunkline meets an interchange with M-58. From there it turns northward, crossing a line of the Mid-Michigan Railroad. I-675 continues northward, passing to the east of the Aleda E. Lutz VA Medical Center and through more residential neighborhoods in Saginaw Township North. After the interchange with Tittabawassee Road, which provides access to the Fashion Square Mall, I-675 turns northeasterly to connect back to I-75/US 23 north of the Zilwaukee Bridge. The entire length of the freeway has four lanes (two in each direction).

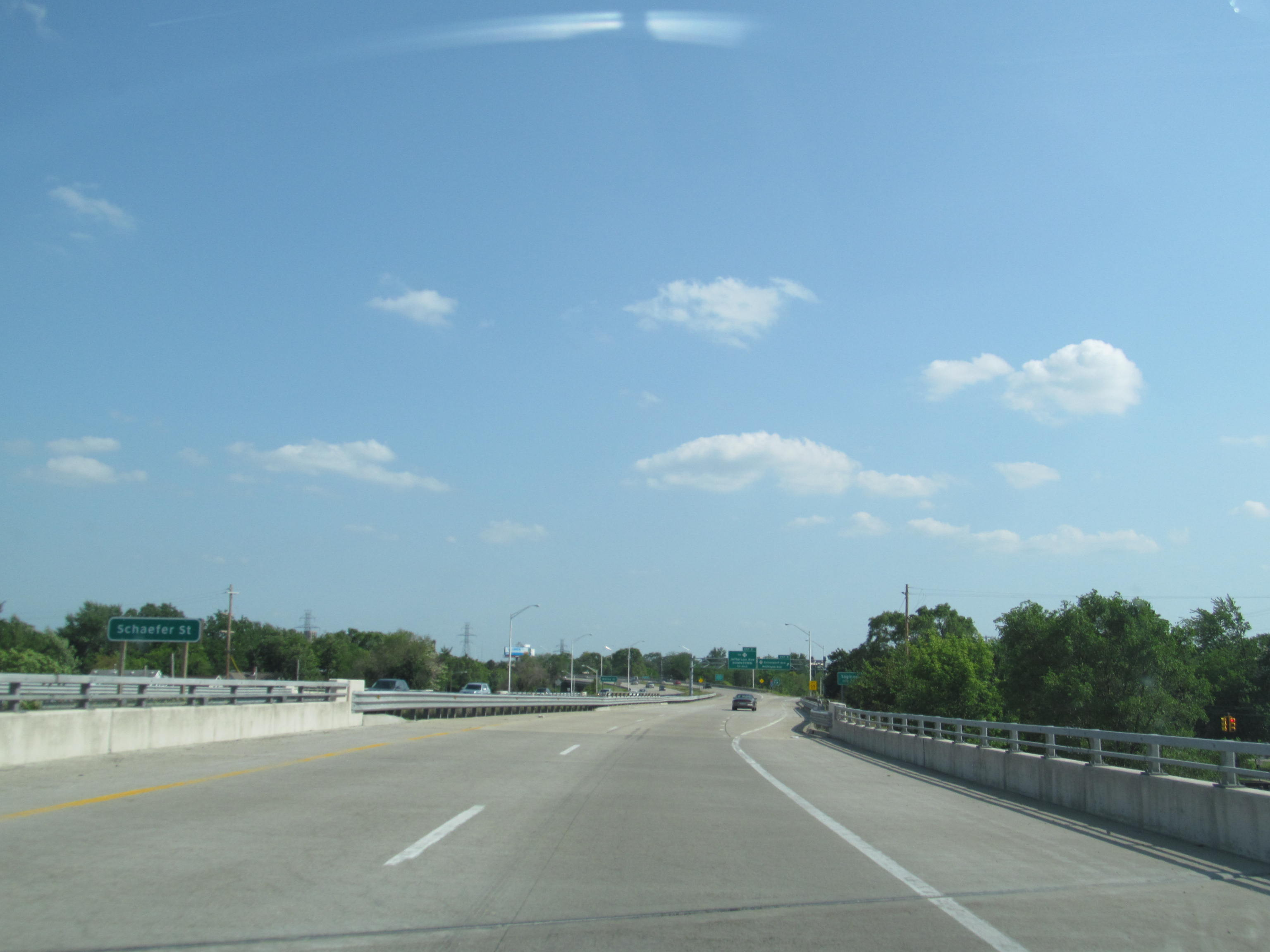
I-675 crossing Schaefer Street in Saginaw

Like other state highways in Michigan, I-675 is maintained by the Michigan Department of Transportation (MDOT). In 2015, the department's traffic surveys showed that on average, 31,300 vehicles used the freeway daily across the river and 9,400 vehicles did so each day north of Tittabawassee Road, the highest and lowest counts along the trunkline, respectively. As an Interstate Highway, all of I-675 is listed on the National Highway System.

== History ==
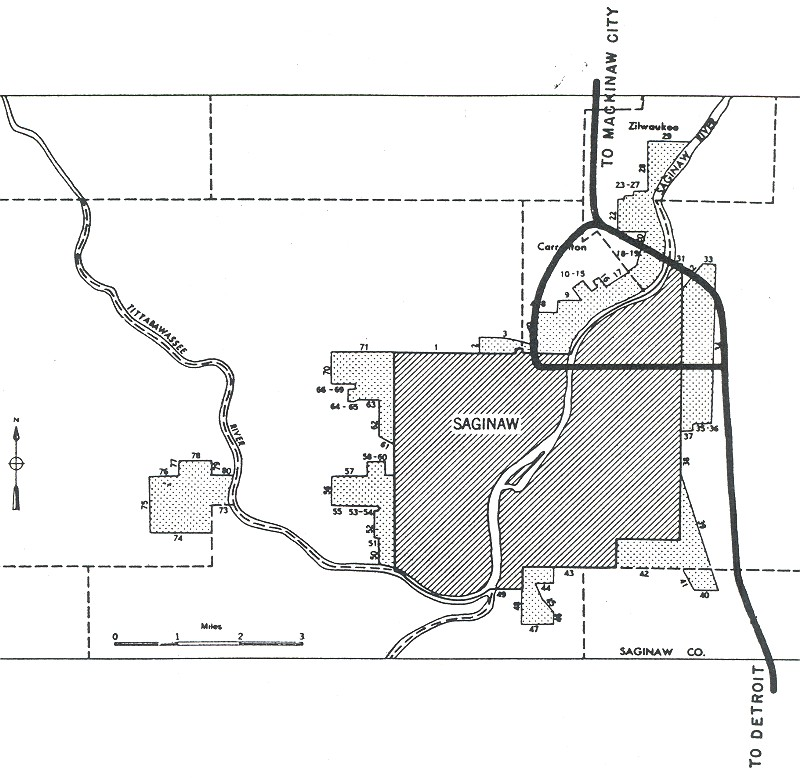
1957 planning map for the Interstates in Saginaw

I-675 was initially planned in the mid-1950s, and the Michigan State Highway Department (MSHD) originally proposed the number I-275 for the freeway through Saginaw in 1958, while the MSHD proposed an I-73 number for what is now I-275. The state started construction on I-675 in 1969. The freeway was to provide access to the downtown Saginaw area and serve as a bypass for the original Zilwaukee Bridge northeast of downtown, roles that continue today. At the time, the Zilwaukee Bridge was a bascule bridge that could be raised to allow shipping traffic to use the Saginaw River. Opening the drawbridge would back traffic up on the freeway for up to four hours on holiday weekends. I-675 helped relieve the congestion during such times. The record was a 56-mile-long (90 km) traffic jam on Labor Day 1968, although 20-mile (32 km) backups were common until the shipping companies using the Saginaw River limited their traffic in 1970. The freeway was completed in 1971 and opened to traffic that year. After completion, the state considered reconstructing I-675 to make the downtown freeway the through routing for I-75/US 23 in the Saginaw area to bypass the bascule bridge. Originally to be completed in 1983, the replacement bridge on I-75/US 23 finally opened on September 19, 1988. The next year, southbound I-675 was used to divert traffic around a temporary closure on the southbound span of the Zilwaukee Bridge. At the same time, northbound I-675 was closed while crews replaced the deck on the bridge over the Saginaw River.

In 2002, the Zilwaukee Bridge was closed for a few months for joint repair work, and traffic was diverted onto I-675. The freeway through downtown was pressed back into service as a detour around the Zilwaukee Bridge for six months in 2008 as a mishap involving several steel reinforcement rods during a maintenance project closed that structure for an extended period of time. Then, starting in May 2009 and ending in November 2011, sections of I-675 were closed from exit 2 easterly to begin renovations during the summer construction seasons. These projects included rehabilitation of the Henry G. Marsh Bridge, the reconstruction of overpasses, and a redesigned exit at Warren Avenue to ease access into downtown Saginaw. The project cost $42 million (equivalent to $57.3 million in 2023).

== Exit list ==
The entire highway is in Saginaw County.

Location	mi	km	Exit	Destinations	Notes
Buena Vista Township	0.000	0.000	—	I-75 / US 23 – Flint, Mackinac Bridge	Exit 150 on I-75/US 23
Saginaw	1.110– 1.124	1.786– 1.809	1	Veterans Memorial Parkway	
Saginaw	1.844– 1.897	2.968– 3.053	2A	5th Avenue, 6th Avenue	Northbound exit and southbound entrance
Saginaw	2.333	3.755	2B	To M-13 / Warren Avenue, Jefferson Avenue – Downtown Saginaw	Signed as exit 2 southbound; Warren Avenue signed northbound only, Jefferson Avenue signed southbound only
Saginaw	2.896– 3.237	4.661– 5.209	3	M-58 (Davenport Avenue) / Michigan Avenue	Southbound exit via Hill Street; eastern terminus of M-58
Saginaw Township	5.854	9.421	6	Tittabawassee Road – Zilwaukee	
Zilwaukee Township	7.728	12.437	—	I-75 / US 23 – Flint, Mackinac Bridge	Exit 155 on I-75/US 23
1.000 mi = 1.609 km; 1.000 km = 0.621 mi: Incomplete access
