= Saginaw, Michigan =

- City
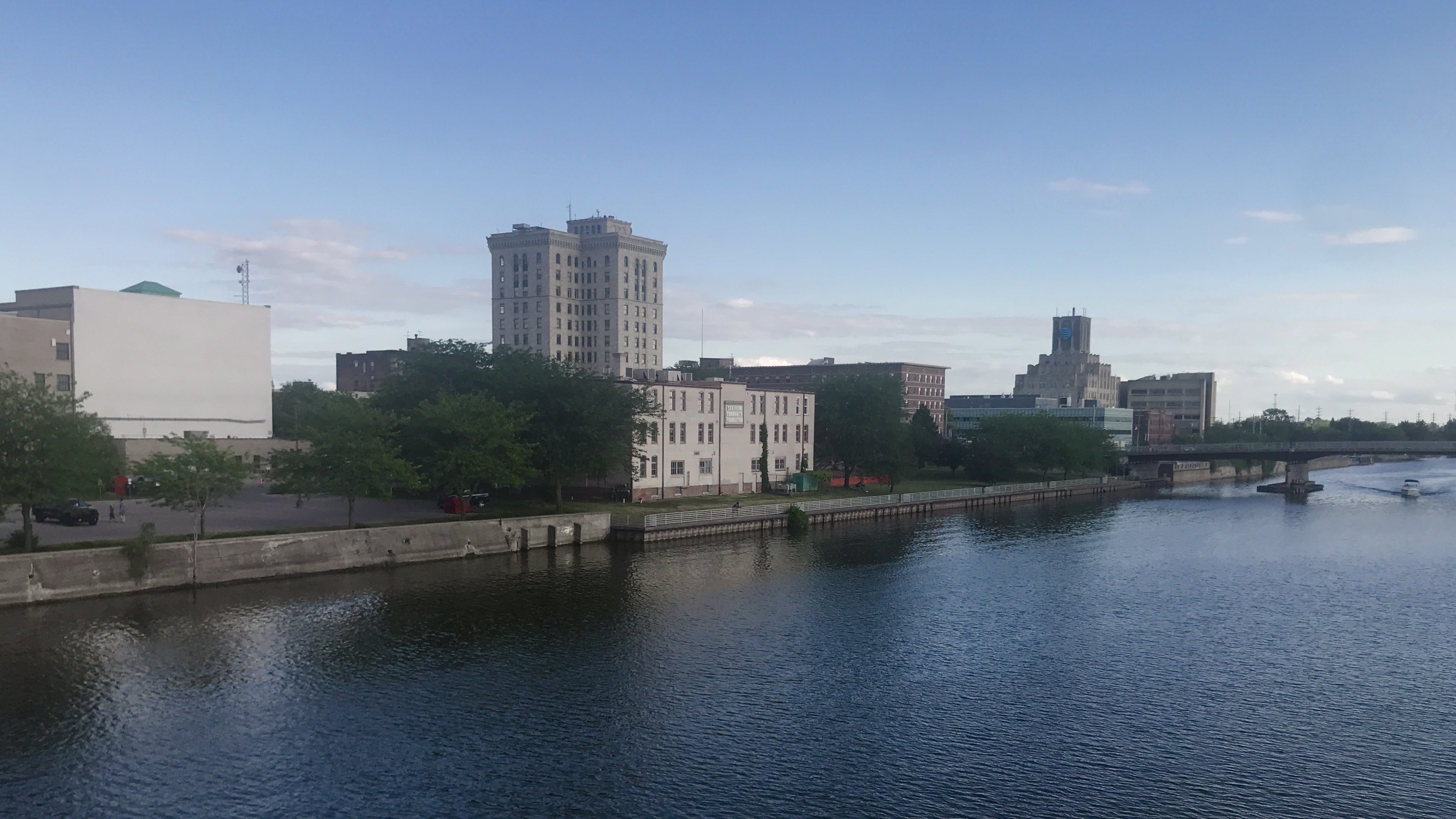
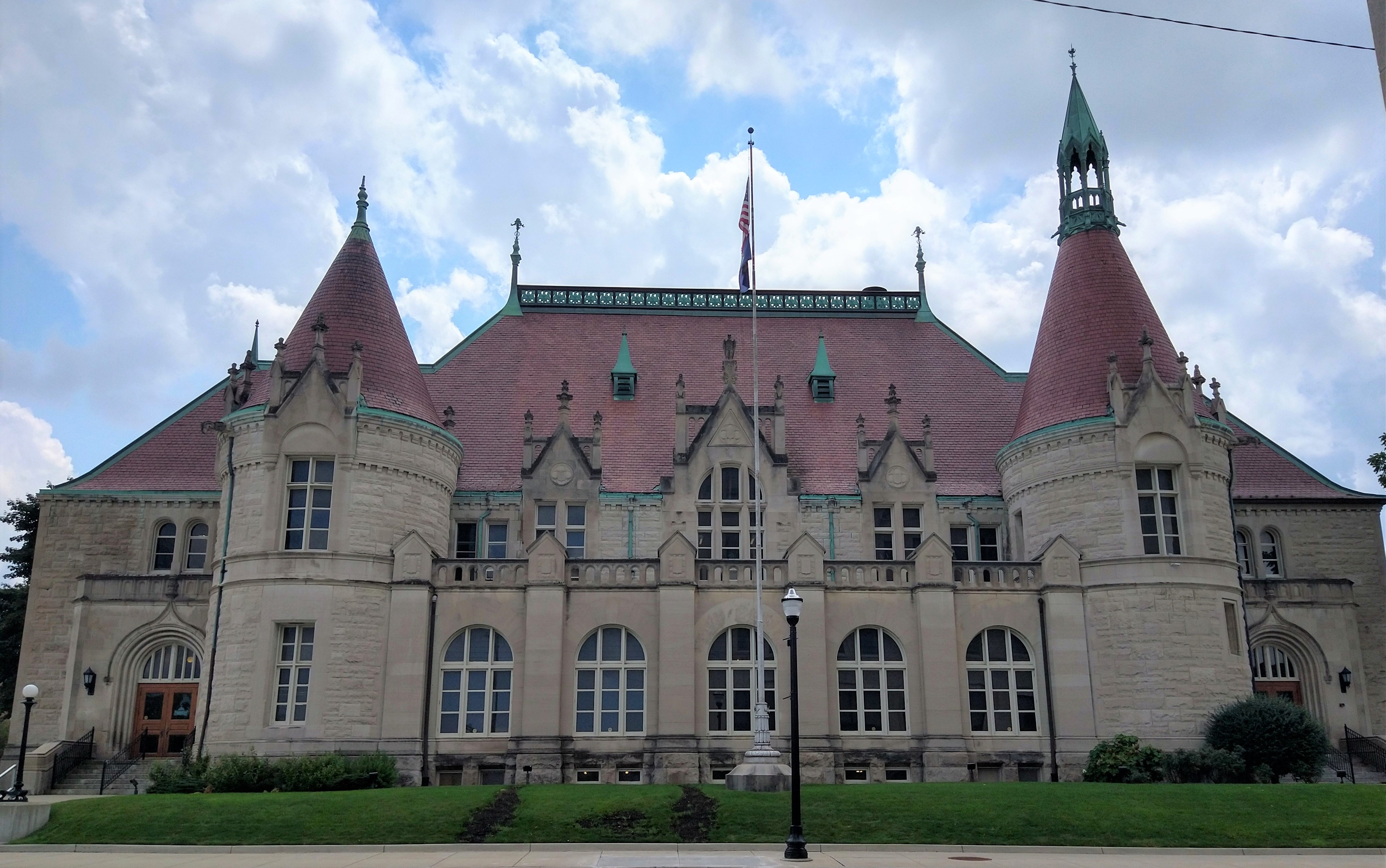
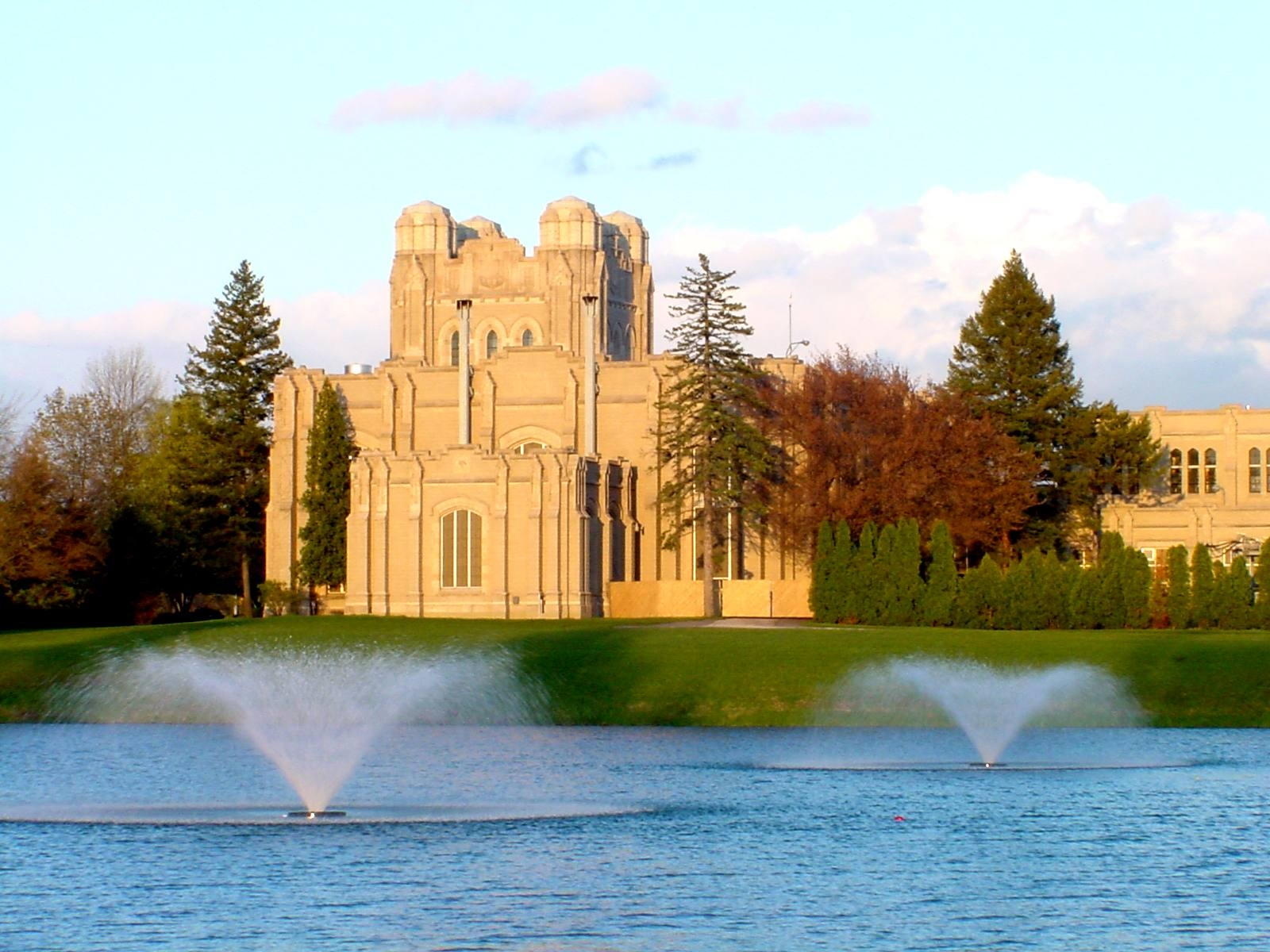
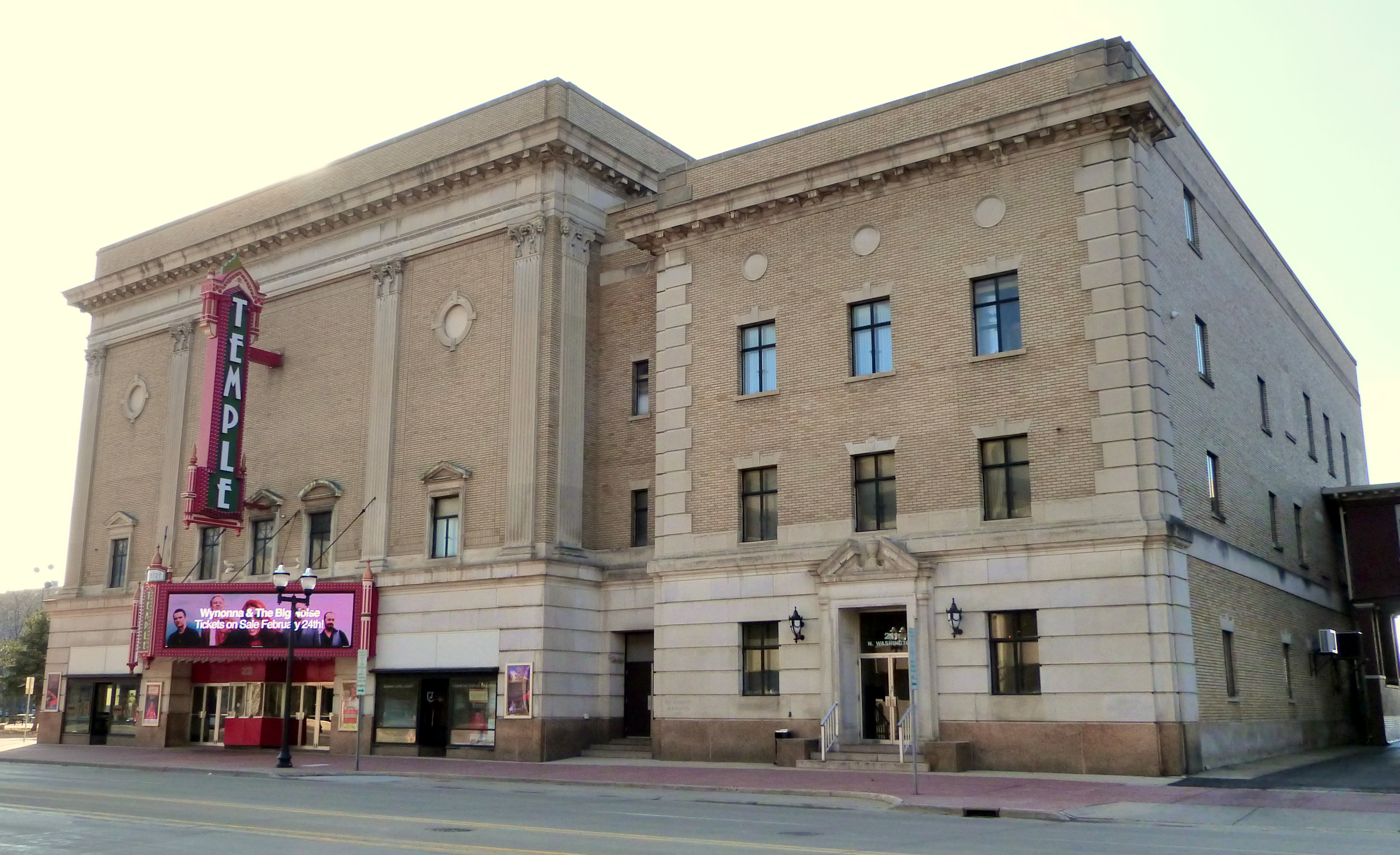
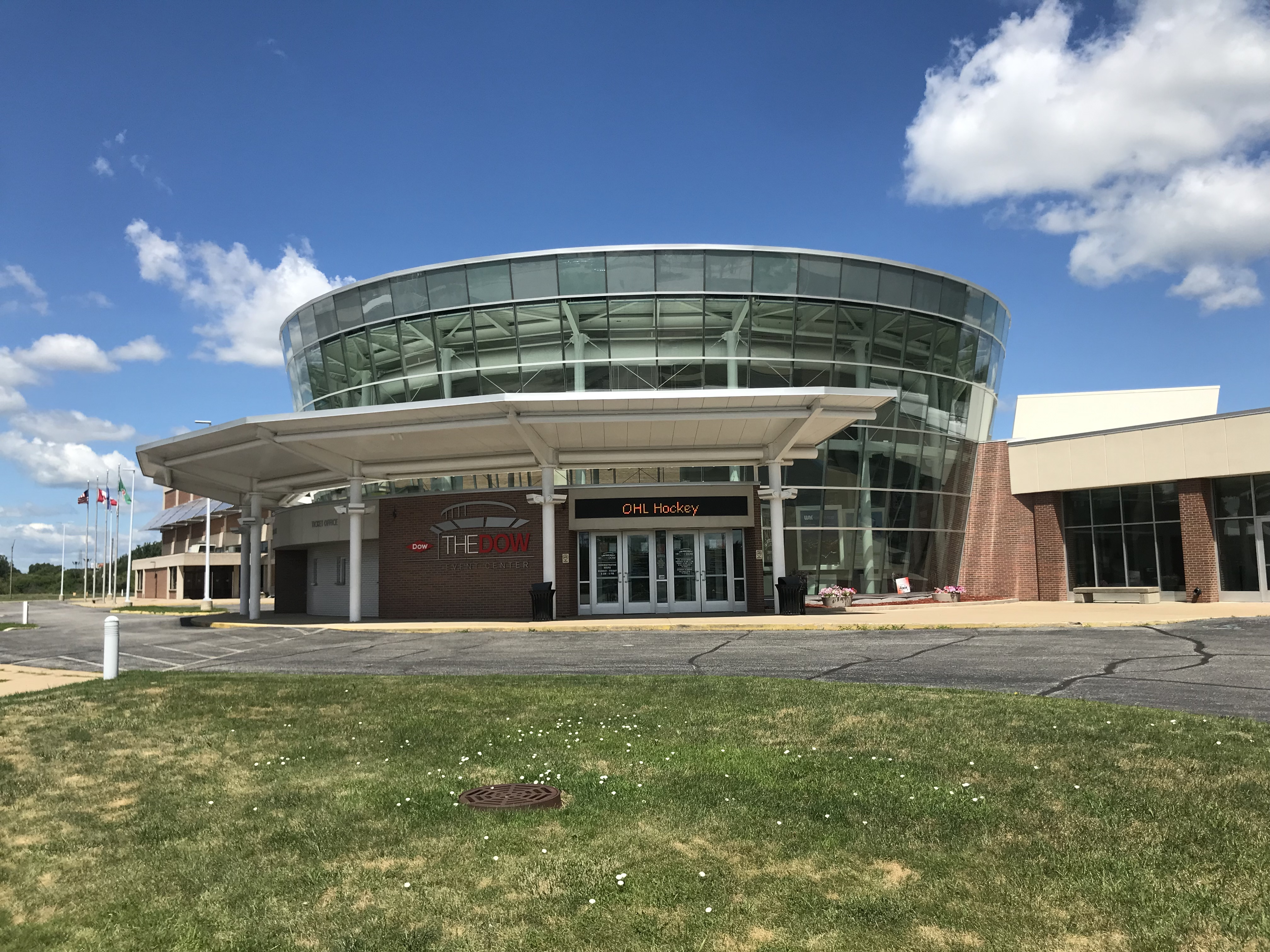
- Downtown Saginaw Castle Museum The Grove Temple Theatre Dow Event Center

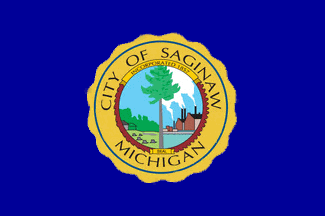
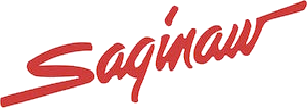
- Flag Seal Logo
- Nickname: "Sagnasty"
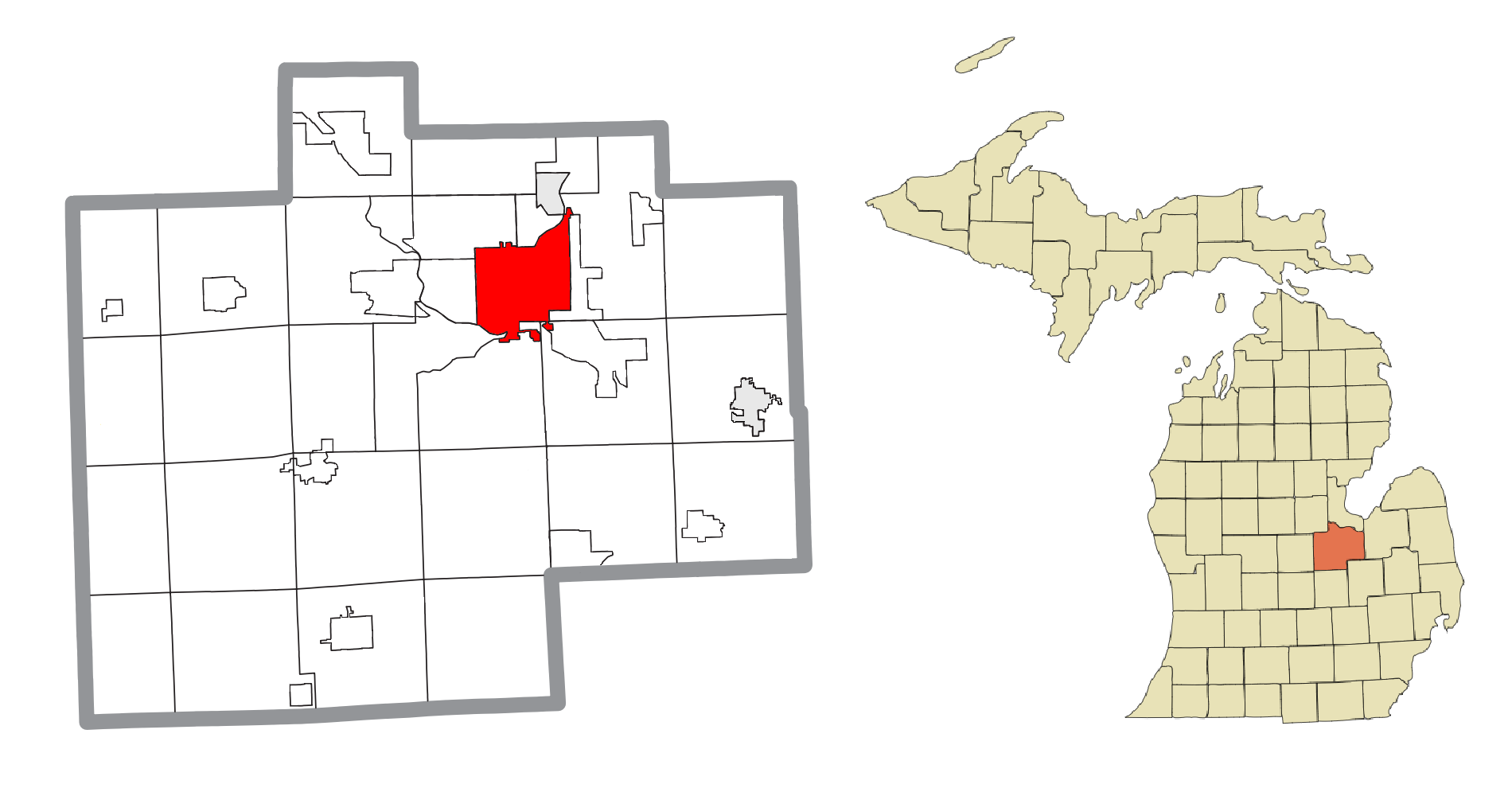
- Location within Saginaw County

- Location within Michigan Location within the United States
- Coordinates: 43°25′12″N 83°57′00″W
- Country: United States
- State: Michigan
- County: Saginaw
- Settled: 1819
- Incorporated: 1857

Government
  - Type: Council–manager
  - Mayor: Brenda Moore (D)
  - City manager: Tim Morales

Area
  - City: 17.81 sq mi (46.12 km^{2})
  - Land: 17.10 sq mi (44.28 km^{2})
  - Water: 0.71 sq mi (1.84 km^{2})
- Elevation: 591 ft (180 m)

Population (2020)
  - City: 44,202
  - Estimate (2023): 43,185
  - Density: 2,585.6/sq mi (998.29/km^{2})
  - Urban: 116,058
  - Metro: 187,782
  - CSA: 374,321
- Time zone: UTC−5 (EST)
  - Summer (DST): UTC−4 (EDT)
- ZIP code(s): 48601–48609, 48638, 48663
- Area code: 989
- FIPS code: 26-70520
- GNIS feature ID: 1627020
- Website: www.saginaw-mi.com

Saginaw (/ˈsæɡɪnɔː/) is a city in Saginaw County, Michigan, United States, and its county seat. It had a population of 44,202 at the 2020 census. Located along the Saginaw River, Saginaw is adjacent to Saginaw Charter Township and considered part of the Greater Tri-Cities region of Central Michigan. The Saginaw metropolitan area had a population of 190,124 in 2020, while the Tri-Cities area had 377,474 residents.

Established as a fort following the 1819 Treaty of Saginaw, Saginaw was a thriving lumber town in the 19th century. It was an important industrial city and manufacturing center throughout much of the 20th century due to its automobile and automotive parts production led by General Motors. As part of the Rust Belt, its industry and strong manufacturing presence declined, leading to increased unemployment, crime, and a population decline. Modern economic development is focused on comparative advantages in innovation, clean energy, and continued manufacturing exports. However, the city continues to have a higher proportion of manufacturing jobs than the U.S. average.

== Etymology ==
The name Saginaw is widely believed to mean 'where the Sauk were' in Ojibwe, from Sace-nong or Sak-e-nong ('Sauk Town'), due to the belief that the Sauk once lived there. However, it is more likely that the name means 'place of the outlet', from the Ojibwe sag ('opening') and ong ('place of').

When Natives told Samuel de Champlain that the Sauk nation was on the western shore of Lake Michigan, Champlain mistakenly placed them on the western shore of Lake Huron. This mistake was copied on subsequent maps, and future references identified this as the place of the Sauks. Champlain himself never visited what is now Michigan.

== History ==
=== 19th century ===
==== Early history ====
The site of what later became the city of Saginaw was originally inhabited by the Anishnabeg. French missionaries and traders first appeared in the area during the late 17th century and encountered the Ojibwe (Chippewa) living in the area. The first permanent settlement by those other than Native Americans was in 1816 when Louis Campau established a trading post on the west bank of the Saginaw River. Shortly thereafter the United States established Fort Saginaw. Campau's trading post was also inhabited by Metis.

During Michigan's territorial period, a county and township government were organized at Saginaw. Growth of the settlement was fueled rapidly during the 19th century by the lumber industry. Saginaw was the site of numerous sawmills and served as a port for Great Lakes vessels. What is now the city of Saginaw resulted from the consolidation of the cities of East Saginaw and Saginaw City (West Side) in 1889.

==== Fort Saginaw ====
In 1819, Lewis Cass, in the Treaty of Saginaw, negotiated the prerogative for the United States to own and settle the area with the leaders of the Ojibwe. In 1820, Campau attempted to expand across to the east bank of the river but was rejected by the Chippewas. In 1822, the United States Army established a fort on the west bank of the Saginaw River and named it Fort Saginaw. Two companies were stationed at the fort. A group of investors purchased some land near the fort and had it platted under the name, Town of Sagana. Due to the extremely harsh seasons and illnesses, Fort Saginaw was abandoned by 1824.

By the late 1820s, the American Fur Company was operating a post at Saginaw.

Few plots were sold and after the U.S. Army pulled out, the town languished for most of the following decade. The town was re-platted in December 1830, comprising riverfront from Cass Street, on the south, to Harrison Street, and north to Jefferson. These plots sold slowly. By 1835, only 24 plots had been sold and the remainder were transferred to a new owner, who made another plat in February 1837. However, the financial crisis of the Panic of 1837 dampened interest in purchasing properties. After selling only 58 of the 407 plots, the remainder was sold again in 1841.

==== Native Americans ====
Saginaw was the location of the annual government payment to the Ojibwe and Ottawa of the area, starting in the 1830s. This also attracted many French-Canadian and Euro-American merchants, primarily involved in selling watered down whiskey.

==== Lumber boom ====
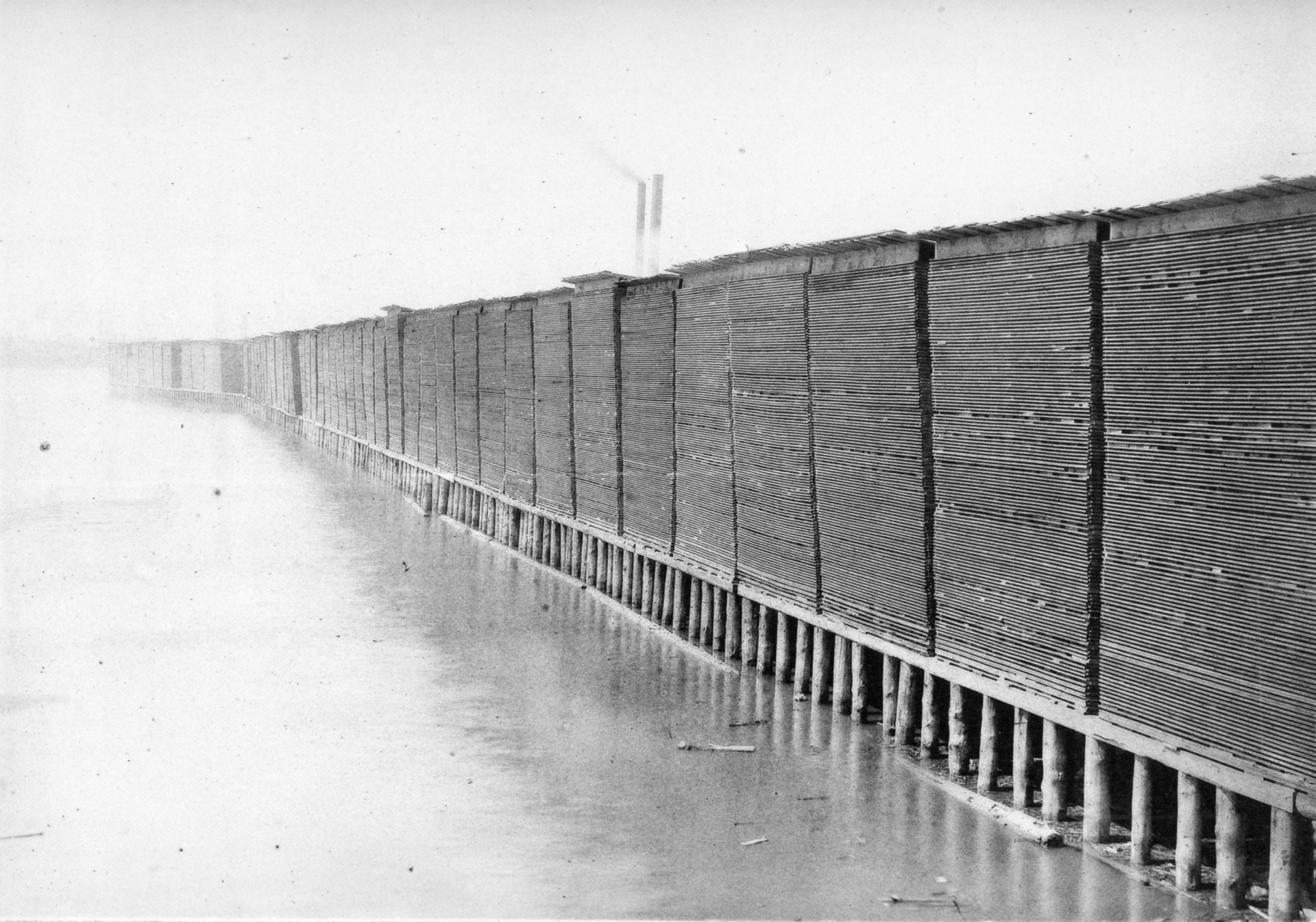
Eddy lumber docks

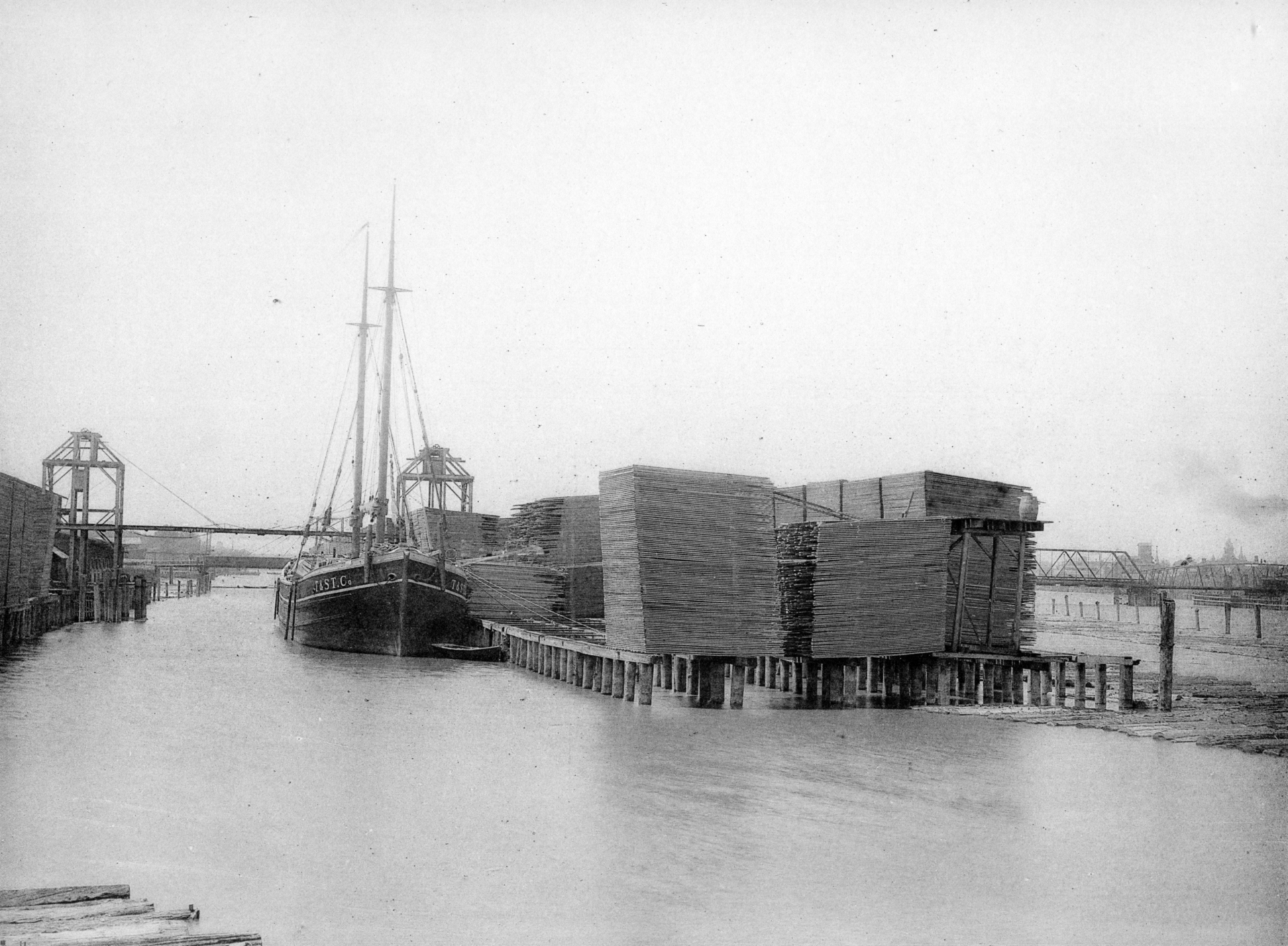
Holland lumber docks on Saginaw River 1888

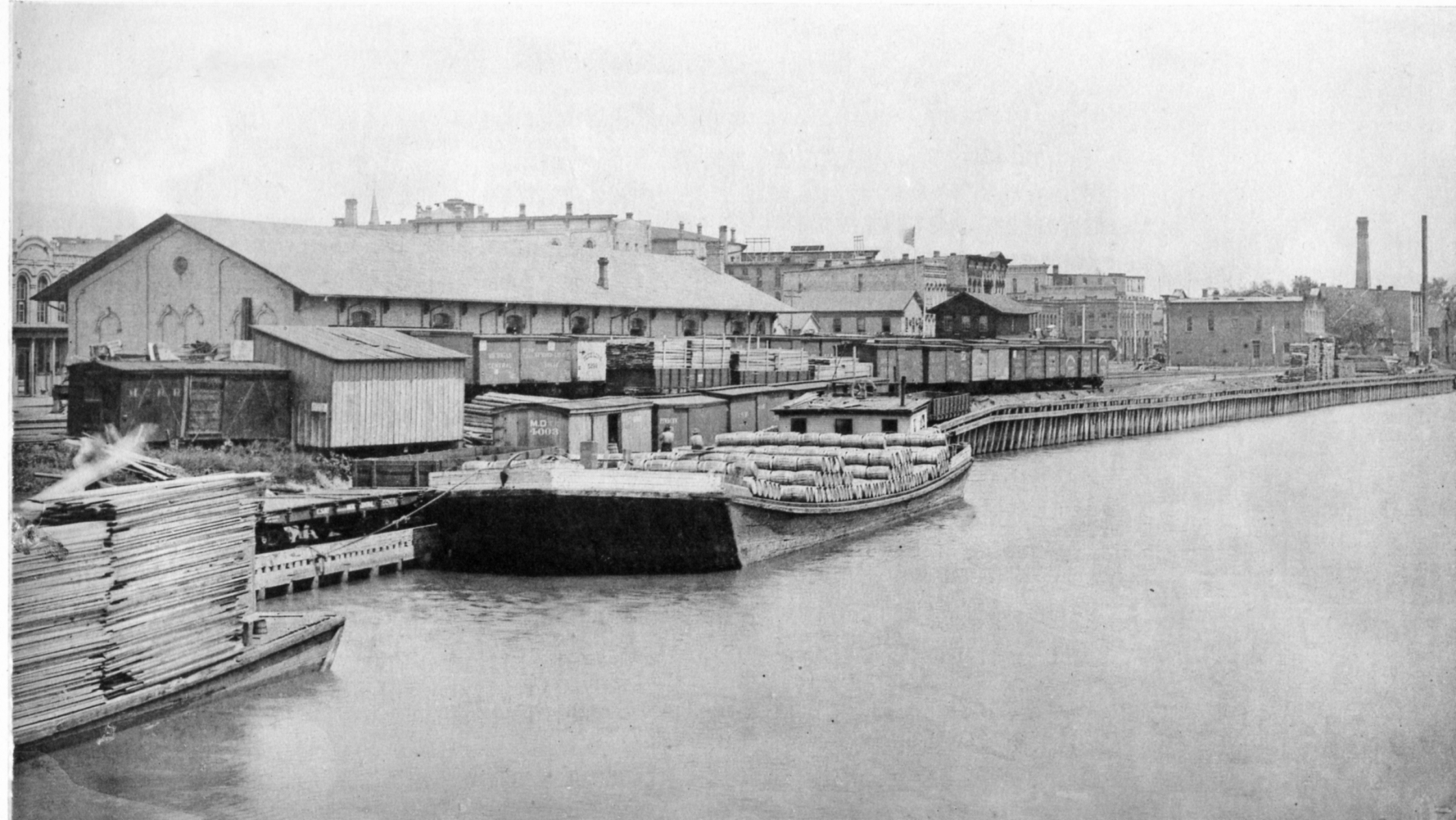
Lumber docks in Saginaw City at Mackinaw Street 1888

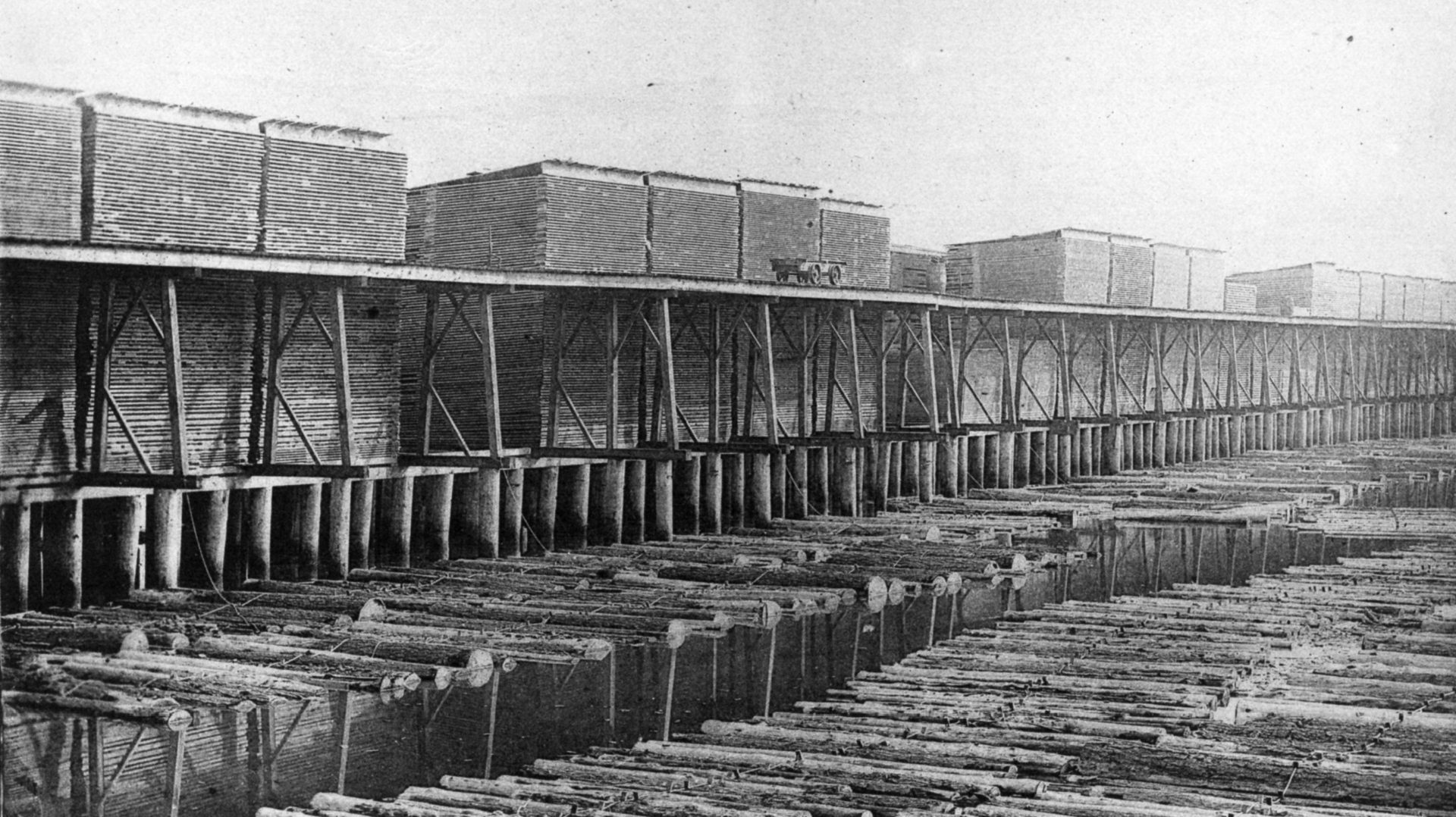
AW Wright lumber docks along Saginaw River

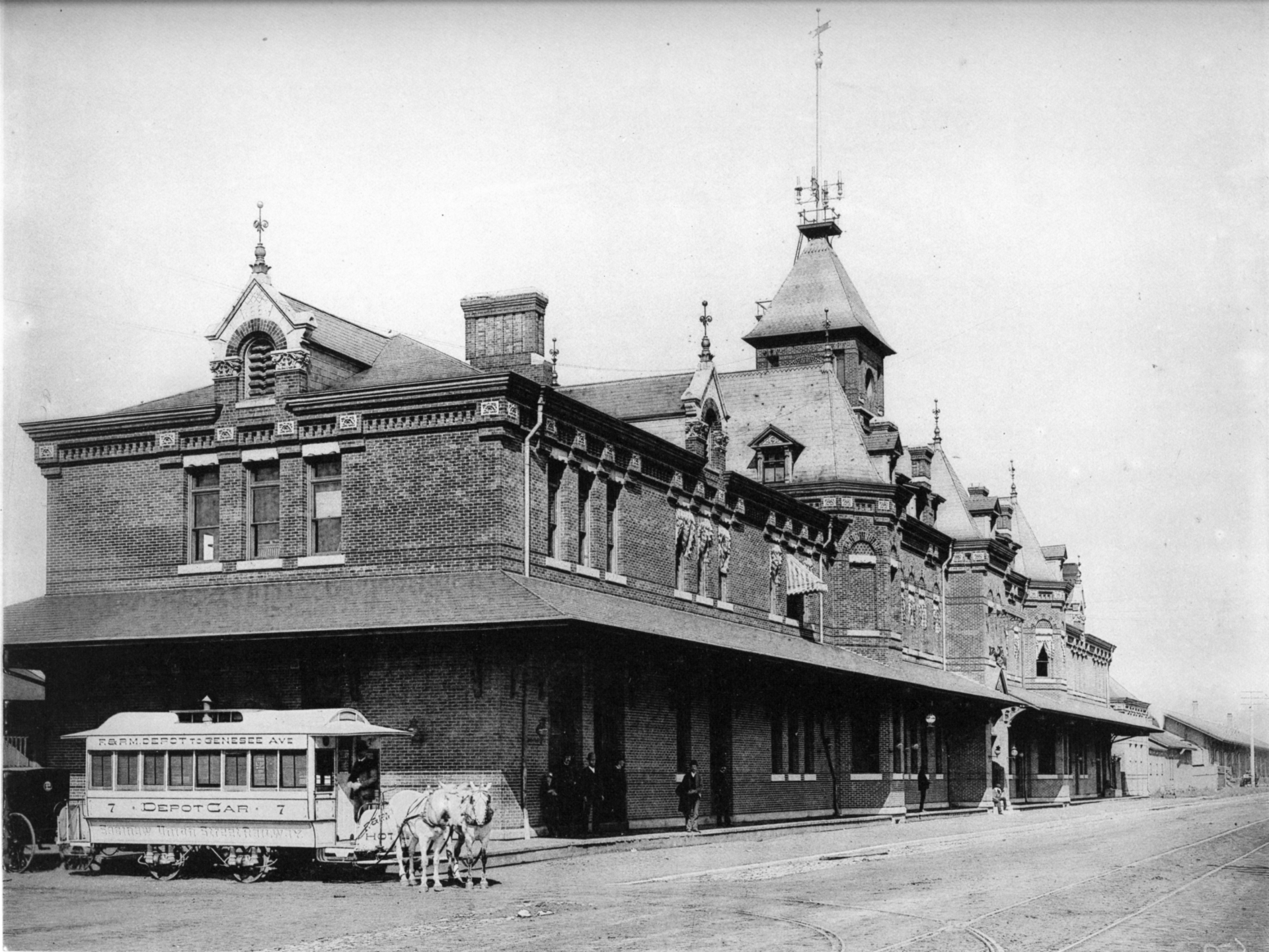
Pere Marquette Railroad Station (Potter Street Station) 1888

The main cause for the founding and subsequent development of Saginaw was the large demand for lumber as the United States expanded westward. A virgin growth forest principally consisting of white pine trees covered most of Michigan. The convenient access to transportation provided by the Saginaw River and its numerous tributaries fueled a massive expansion in population and economic activity. As the trees were being cut down in the region, logs were floated down the rivers to sawmills located in Saginaw, destined to be loaded onto ships and later railroad cars.

Multiple settlements comprise present-day Saginaw. On the west side of the river the first settlement around what had been Fort Saginaw developed into Saginaw, which was incorporated as a city in 1857, containing the seat of the Saginaw County government. On the east side of the river a parallel settlement, East Saginaw, developed which was incorporated first as a village in 1855, and then as a city in 1859. Also south of East Saginaw, on the east bank of the river, the village of Salina formed. Salina's name relates to the brine that led to a growing industry of salt production in the area. Both Saginaw and East Saginaw quickly became a hub for railroad transportation in addition to ships on the Saginaw River. Lumber production peaked by the early 1870s, but had virtually disappeared by the end of the 19th century. In addition to salt production, which experienced an eventual decline as well, growing industries, such as those supporting the area's agriculture and manufacturing, developed.

==== Consolidation ====
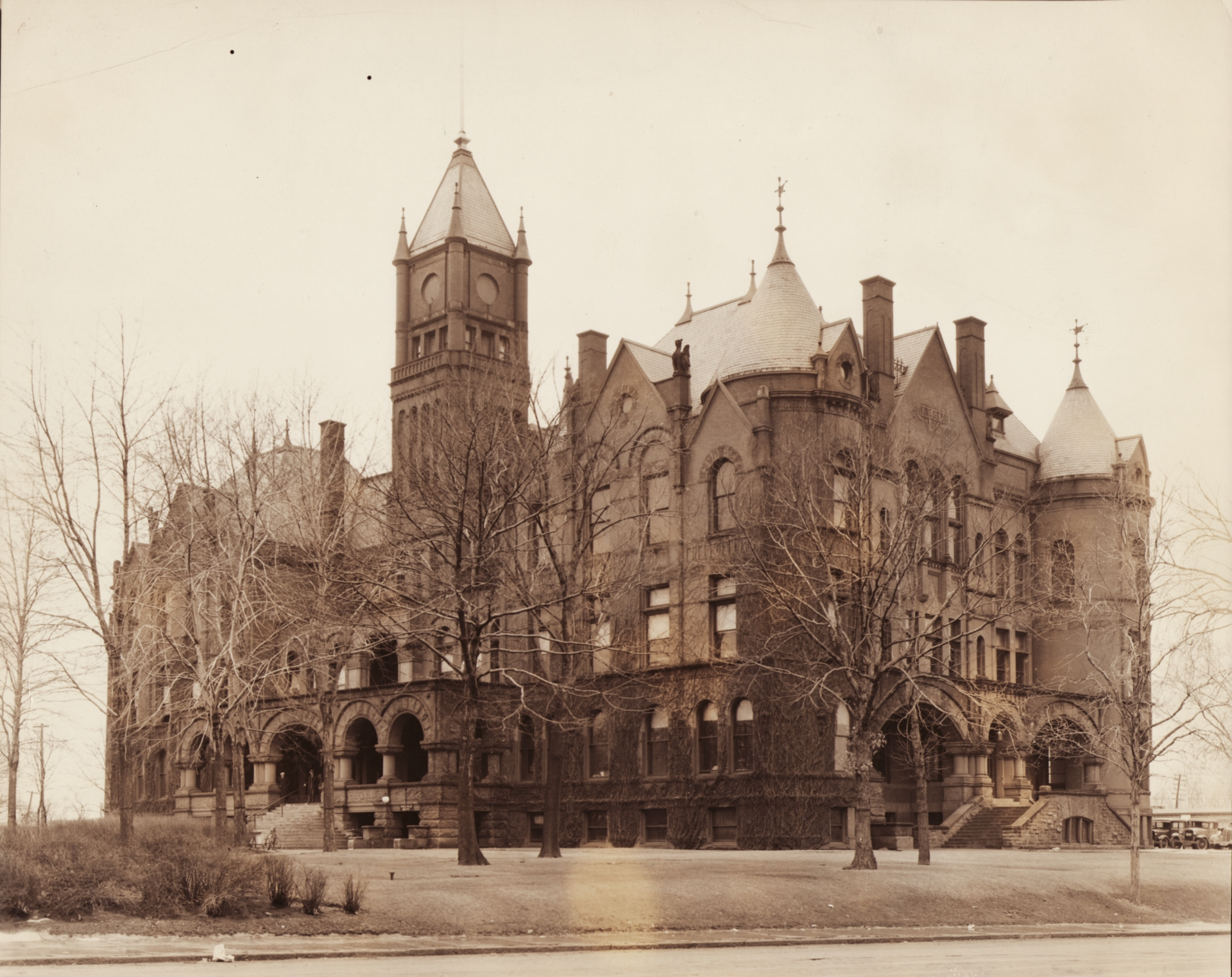
Saginaw City Hall

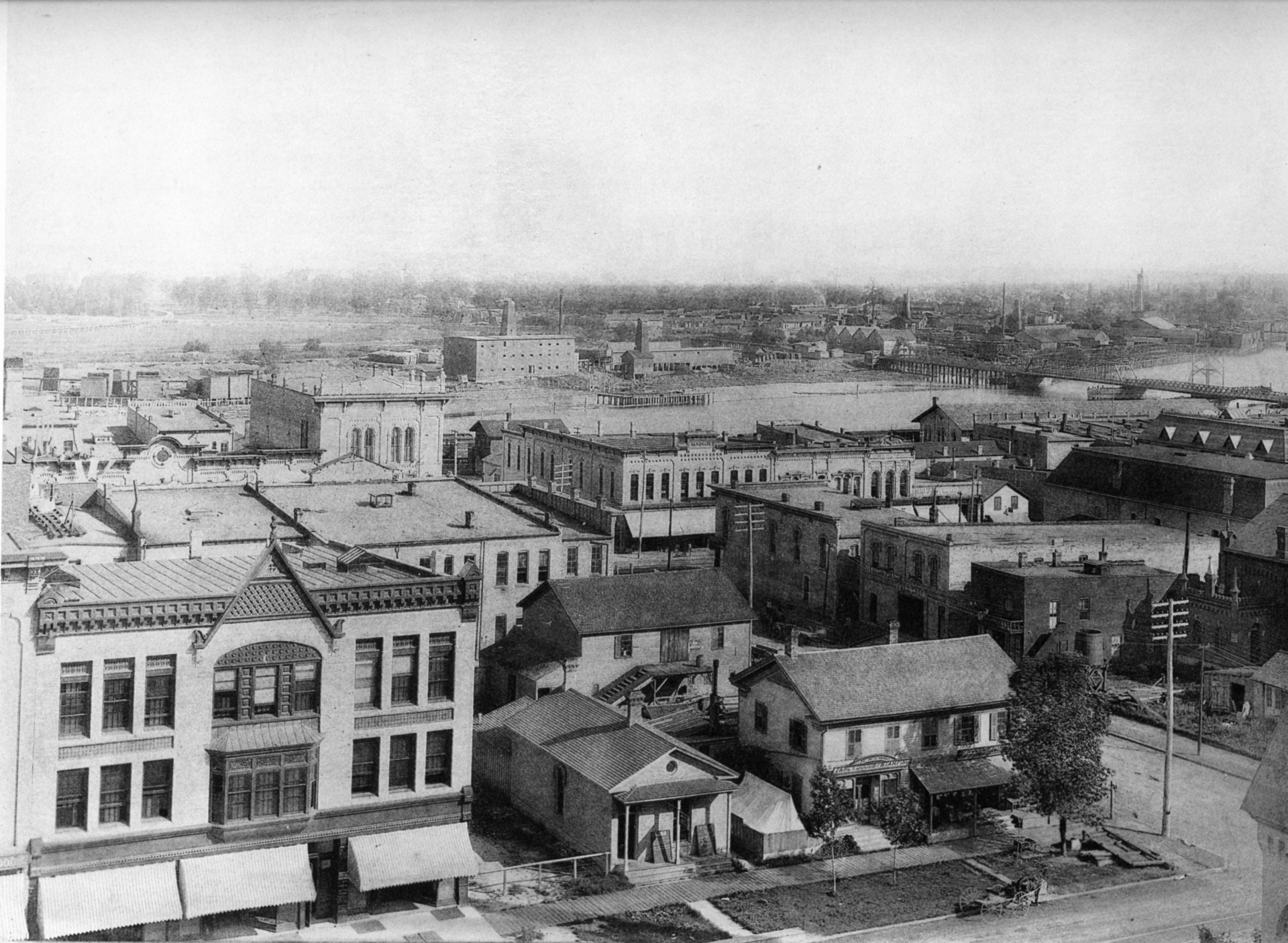
Saginaw City, looking east from the courthouse towards the river, 1888

On June 28, 1889, the Michigan state legislature passed Act 455 to consolidate the cities of Saginaw and East Saginaw into a single city. Prior to this consolidation, the nearby village of Salina had already become part of East Saginaw. The consolidation of Saginaw became effective with the election of officers on March 12, 1890.

The provisions of the city charter were established by the same act of the legislature that provided for the consolidation. Saginaw was to be governed by a city council consisting of two aldermen elected from 21 wards and a mainly ceremonial executive mayor who was to have fairly weak powers. This was to be, as numerous other elected officials, along with elected or appointed boards, controlled much of the administrative and executive functions of government. The efficient and cohesive functioning of the Saginaw city government also was constrained by remaining rivalries between residents, business owners, and politicians from the former two cities. The distinctions and rivalries between Saginaw's east side and west side persisted into the 20th century in various forms, and continues to influence Saginaw's social, political, economic landscape, even into the 2010s.

=== 20th century ===
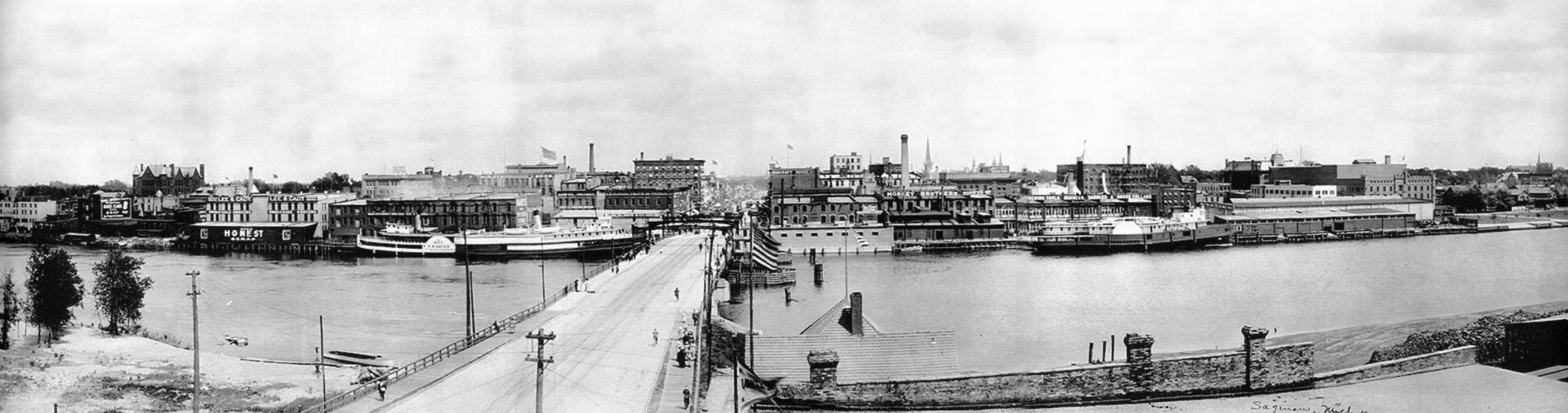
Panorama of downtown Saginaw, 1912

==== Industrialization ====
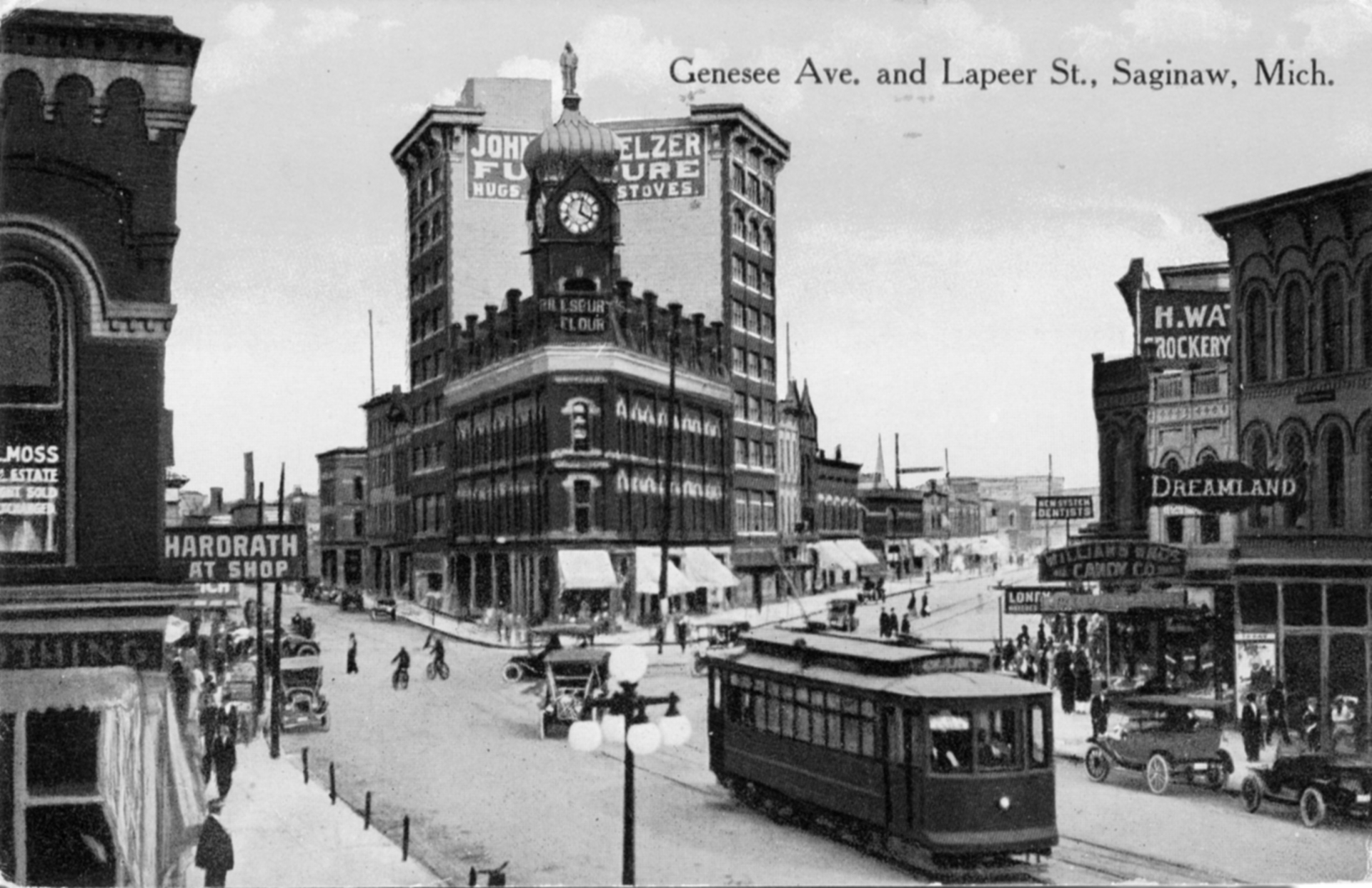
Downtown Saginaw about 1915

In the early 20th century, automobile production proliferated throughout Michigan, but most notably in Detroit. Other Michigan cities became suppliers to Detroit factories, sometimes with factories of their own. In Saginaw, the Jackson-Church-Wilcox Company began as a partnership in 1906 for producing steering gear under the "Jacox" brand. Jackson-Church-Wilcox was acquired by Buick in 1909, and as part of General Motors became the Jackson, Church and Wilcox Division, the first GM division devoted to parts production. In 1919 the Jacox division was merged with Saginaw Malleable Iron and Central Foundry into GM's Saginaw Products Company. This formed the basis for the Saginaw Steering Gear Division, created in 1928. General Motors and other manufacturers established foundries and other automobile-related manufacturing facilities in Saginaw, for the production of chemicals and plate glass, as well as metal fabrication. This early development of a symbiotic relationship with the auto industry set the course for the future of the city.

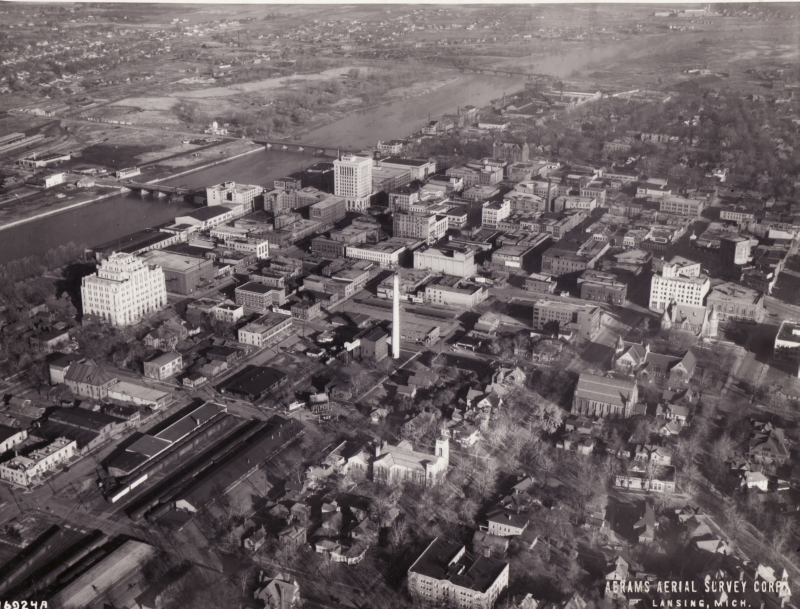
Aerial view of downtown Saginaw in 1930

Before the United States entered World War II, Saginaw's industrial complex became directed towards military production. Turning its efforts to the production of munitions, ordnance and components for military vehicles made Saginaw a significant contributor to the Allies' victory. Saginaw was home to a production facility that produced .30 caliber machine guns more quickly and at lower cost than the Army thought possible, armor-piercing shells for anti-tank use, and more than half a million M1 carbine rifles for the US military during World War II, the "Gun Plant" that later became Steering Gear Plant 2. Saginaw Steering Gear's Plant 1 also began wartime production in 1941, concentrating on ball screws that would eventually be used in the wing flaps of the Boeing B-29 Superfortress. Malleable Iron converted its production of Armasteel from engine components to gun parts and tank treads, while Grey Iron specialized in the production of magnesium for use in Pratt & Whitney airplane engines.

Migration from across the country, particularly from the Southern United States, drastically increased Saginaw's population during the war years and through the 1950s. This population growth included the expanded presence of African Americans and Latinos in Saginaw. Even before the end of the war, the needs of Saginaw's growth became clear, and were met by significant investment in the city's infrastructure. In 1947, Saginaw and the nearby city of Midland constructed a 65-mile-long (105 km) water supply pipeline drawing water from Whitestone Point in Lake Huron to meet the anticipated needs of the communities. In addition, the cities of Midland and Bay City joined with Saginaw to develop and operate an airport on the site of a former POW camp in nearby Tittabawassee Township, which eventually became MBS International Airport.

==== Governance ====
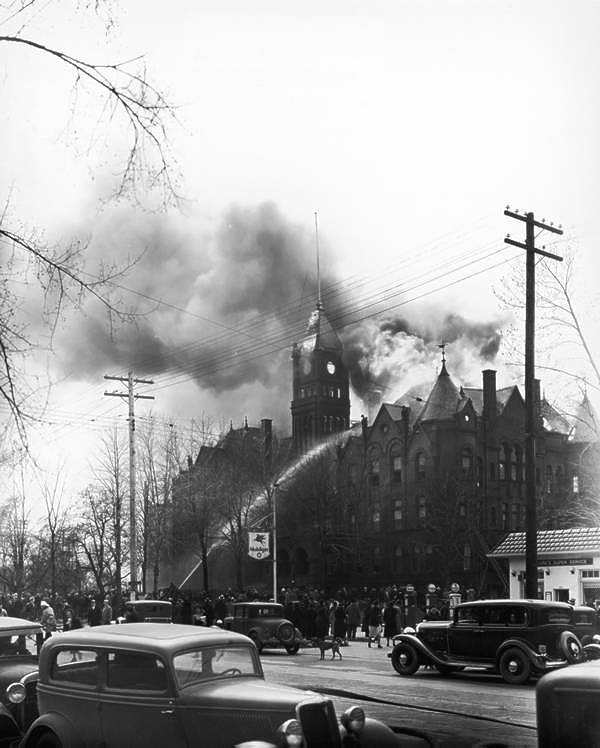
Saginaw city hall burning in 1935. It was replaced with a modest Art Deco building a year later.

In 1908, a new Michigan state constitution was adopted. The new Michigan state constitution mandated increased home rule powers for local units of government, and the Michigan state legislature enacted the Home Rule Cities Act in 1909. Under this statute, cities were permitted to frame and adopt their own city charters and were given great flexibility in structuring their local governments. The government, under the 1889 charter, had continued to be inefficient and provided for much political infighting. In 1913, a new city charter was adopted with voter approval and which followed a commission form of city government that had gained in popular interest among various cities across the United States in the early 20th century. The new government consisted of five commissioners, each elected separately at-large, who served both as the city council and as the executive heads of various city government departments. One of the commissioners served as the mayor, which was a mostly ceremonial role.

The 1913 city charter was followed for little more than two decades when the voters of the city again adopted another new city charter in 1935 following the council-manager form of government. The government under the 1913 city charter retained some of the independent boards that were given authority independent of the elected city commissioners. This caused some inefficiency and political friction. The economic consequences of the Great Depression during the 1930s provided the final catalyst for municipal government reform.

In contrast to the previous government structures, the 1935 charter, having taken effect in 1936, provided for all administration of city government to be headed directly by a single officer, the city manager, who was appointed by, and accountable to a city council of nine members elected as a group by the entire city at-large. The system was designed to address two principal issues with Saginaw's history of municipal government, the inefficiency and politics associated with having executive and administrative authority spread among many different officers and boards, and political rivalries and friction between various geographic areas of the city, mainly the east side and the west side.

==== Post World War II ====
In the years following World War II, the Michigan state legislature enacted laws making it increasingly difficult for incorporated cities to expand by annexing territory from neighboring townships. Townships, which had historically served an agrarian, smaller population than that of larger cities, were given the ability to provide nearly all the same services an incorporated city could. Although Midland pursued (and continues to pursue) a policy of "No annexation, no water," Saginaw chose to sell water to neighboring communities under long-term contracts. This allowed the townships to further develop at the expense of the city, the limits of which changed little after consolidation in 1889–90. The unintended consequence of this choice was that Saginaw's population stopped growing, new housing development focused on the suburban townships, and businesses eventually followed.

=== 21st century ===
==== Population decline ====
Manufacturing in Saginaw declined in the latter half of the 20th century, leading to high unemployment in the city. As a result, the city's population diminished dramatically. From 2000 to 2010, the population of Saginaw proper decreased by nearly 10,000. Michigan's population during that period decreased by 0.6% percent, the only U.S. state to lose population during the decade of the 2000s. In addition, Saginaw has faced increasing social problems relating to poverty as a result of its high rate of unemployment. The crime rate has been a major area of concern for the community.

==== Unemployment and crime ====
Saginaw's economic conditions, compounded by the Great Recession, are a significant area of concern for the city's residents. The decline in manufacturing jobs has resulted in higher than average rates of unemployment. Property values in the city have declined, decreasing the amount the city government collects in property taxes. Unemployment in Saginaw peaked in July 2009, according to the Bureau of Labor Statistics, standing at 23.5%. The unemployment rate dropped to 9.0% as of April 2015; crime has decreased as unemployment has decreased.

Saginaw consistently ranks as having one of the highest crime rates in both Michigan and the United States at large. In 2020, Saginaw had a homicide rate of 50.2 per 100,000 people, narrowly surpassing Detroit's rate (49.7) and dwarfing the state and national rates (7.6 and 6.5, respectively).

==== Combating blight ====
Unemployment and population loss in the late 20th and early 21st centuries has led to urban decay, specifically a rise in abandoned homes that provided locations for criminal activity. In recent years, city officials, law enforcement, and neighborhood watch associations have made progress in preventing this activity by heavily patrolling target areas and offering rewards for reporting illegal or suspicious activities.

Efforts to reduce blight in Saginaw increased greatly in 2013, with the United States Department of the Treasury approving a grant to demolish vacant and abandoned properties via the Michigan State Housing Development Authority. The $100 million grant contained $11.2 million set aside for Saginaw, with Detroit receiving $52.3 million, Flint $20.1 million, Pontiac $3.7 million, and the final $2.5 million going to Grand Rapids. After the grant's approval, Saginaw city officials announced a program to purchase unwanted, abandoned structures from their owners, which would be then added to a list of homes to tear down. Officials estimate that there were nearly 1,200 homes within the city limits worthy of demolition.

Efforts to revitalize downtown increased in 2013. CBS television executive and Saginaw native David Strouse announced an investment plan in late 2013 that would save nearly an entire block of buildings slated for demolition at the intersection of Washington and Genesee, the core of downtown Saginaw. The plan called for the renovation and redevelopment of four buildings, creating market-rate apartments on the upper floors and retail space at ground level. In 2012 a similar deal was made for the Bancroft and Eddy apartments at the same intersection. Once Section 8 housing, these buildings are being transformed into market-rate apartments and retail space.

Economic development in the region is focused on comparative advantages in innovation, clean energy, and continued manufacturing exports. Compared to other mid-sized communities, Saginaw has a high number of patent applications per job, and more than 81 times the average US share of jobs in photovoltaic technology research and production. The city continues to have a higher proportion of manufacturing jobs than the US average.

== Geography ==
According to the U.S. Census Bureau, the city has a total area of 18.10 square miles (46.88 km^{2}), of which, 17.34 square miles (44.91 km^{2}) is land and 0.76 square miles (1.97 km^{2}) is water. Saginaw lies on the Saginaw River, 15 miles (24 km) inland from the Saginaw Bay, an arm of Lake Huron. The city sits in the middle of the Saginaw Bay watershed, the largest in the state of Michigan. It includes the largest contiguous fresh-water coastal wetland in the United States.

=== Neighborhoods ===
The City of Saginaw consists of many diverse neighborhoods, including:

- Downtown
- Old Town
- Southwest Village
- Northmoor
- Heritage Square
- Cathedral District
- Houghton Jones Neighborhood
- South East Side
- Triangle Parks
- St. Stephen's Area
- Brockway-Carmen Park
- Butman-Fish Neighborhood
- Redeemer Area
- Saginaw High Neighborhood
- Northeast Side
- Covenant Neighborhood
- Northwest Neighborhood
- Sheridan Park
- The Woods
- Adams Boulevard Area

=== Climate ===
Saginaw has a humid continental climate influenced by its inland position not on the shore of one of the Great Lakes of Michigan.

Climate data for Saginaw, Michigan (MBS International Airport), 1991–2020 normals, extremes 1898–present
Month	Jan	Feb	Mar	Apr	May	Jun	Jul	Aug	Sep	Oct	Nov	Dec	Year
Record high °F (°C)	62 (17)	74 (23)	87 (31)	88 (31)	95 (35)	104 (40)	111 (44)	103 (39)	100 (38)	91 (33)	80 (27)	67 (19)	111 (44)
Mean maximum °F (°C)	49.0 (9.4)	49.5 (9.7)	65.9 (18.8)	78.4 (25.8)	86.6 (30.3)	92.7 (33.7)	92.6 (33.7)	90.5 (32.5)	88.1 (31.2)	79.7 (26.5)	64.7 (18.2)	52.8 (11.6)	95.0 (35.0)
Mean daily maximum °F (°C)	29.5 (−1.4)	31.8 (−0.1)	42.3 (5.7)	55.8 (13.2)	68.6 (20.3)	78.5 (25.8)	82.2 (27.9)	80.0 (26.7)	73.3 (22.9)	60.2 (15.7)	46.2 (7.9)	34.7 (1.5)	56.9 (13.8)
Daily mean °F (°C)	23.0 (−5.0)	24.5 (−4.2)	34.0 (1.1)	45.9 (7.7)	58.2 (14.6)	68.1 (20.1)	71.7 (22.1)	69.7 (20.9)	62.5 (16.9)	50.8 (10.4)	39.0 (3.9)	28.9 (−1.7)	48.0 (8.9)
Mean daily minimum °F (°C)	16.4 (−8.7)	17.3 (−8.2)	25.7 (−3.5)	36.1 (2.3)	47.7 (8.7)	57.7 (14.3)	61.2 (16.2)	59.4 (15.2)	51.6 (10.9)	41.4 (5.2)	31.8 (−0.1)	23.1 (−4.9)	39.1 (3.9)
Mean minimum °F (°C)	−2.5 (−19.2)	−1.4 (−18.6)	7.0 (−13.9)	23.1 (−4.9)	34.0 (1.1)	43.6 (6.4)	49.9 (9.9)	48.1 (8.9)	37.5 (3.1)	28.2 (−2.1)	16.9 (−8.4)	6.4 (−14.2)	−6 (−21)
Record low °F (°C)	−22 (−30)	−23 (−31)	−12 (−24)	8 (−13)	24 (−4)	33 (1)	39 (4)	37 (3)	27 (−3)	19 (−7)	−3 (−19)	−12 (−24)	−23 (−31)
Average precipitation inches (mm)	1.92 (49)	1.77 (45)	2.02 (51)	3.19 (81)	3.41 (87)	3.28 (83)	2.83 (72)	3.85 (98)	2.81 (71)	2.91 (74)	2.28 (58)	1.85 (47)	32.12 (816)
Average snowfall inches (cm)	13.9 (35)	11.4 (29)	6.0 (15)	2.4 (6.1)	0.0 (0.0)	0.0 (0.0)	0.0 (0.0)	0.0 (0.0)	0.0 (0.0)	0.2 (0.51)	3.3 (8.4)	11.8 (30)	49.0 (124)
Average extreme snow depth inches (cm)	8.5 (22)	7.9 (20)	6.0 (15)	1.2 (3.0)	0.0 (0.0)	0.0 (0.0)	0.0 (0.0)	0.0 (0.0)	0.0 (0.0)	0.1 (0.25)	1.8 (4.6)	5.0 (13)	11.7 (30)
Average precipitation days (≥ 0.01 in)	12.6	10.1	10.1	11.8	12.0	10.2	9.9	10.5	9.7	12.0	11.5	12.2	132.6
Average snowy days (≥ 0.1 in)	10.9	8.4	5.0	1.9	0.1	0.0	0.0	0.0	0.0	0.2	2.9	8.8	38.2
Source: NOAA

== Demographics ==
Historical population
Census	Pop.	Note	%±
1860	1,699		—
1870	7,460		339.1%
1880	10,525		41.1%
1890	46,322		340.1%
1900	42,345		−8.6%
1910	50,510		19.3%
1920	61,903		22.6%
1930	80,715		30.4%
1940	82,794		2.6%
1950	92,918		12.2%
1960	98,265		5.8%
1970	91,849		−6.5%
1980	77,508		−15.6%
1990	69,512		−10.3%
2000	61,799		−11.1%
2010	51,508		−16.7%
2020	44,202		−14.2%
2023 (est.)	43,185		−2.3%
U.S. Decennial Census; 2010 2020

Saginaw is the largest principal city of the Saginaw-Midland-Bay City, MI CSA, a Combined Statistical Area that includes the Saginaw-Saginaw Township North (Saginaw County), Midland (Midland County), and Bay City (Bay County) metropolitan areas, which had a combined population of 377,474 at the 2020 census.

=== Racial and ethnic composition ===
Saginaw, Michigan – Racial and Ethnic Composition (NH = Non-Hispanic) Note: the US Census treats Hispanic/Latino as an ethnic category. This table excludes Latinos from the racial categories and assigns them to a separate category. Hispanics/Latinos may be of any race.
Race / Ethnicity	Pop 2000	Pop 2010	Pop 2020	% 2000	% 2010	% 2020
Black or African American alone (NH)	26,440	23,127	19,176	42.78%	44.90%	43.38%
White alone (NH)	26,372	19,310	15,227	42.67%	37.49%	34.45%
Hispanic or Latino (any race)	7,259	7,344	6,988	11.75%	14.26%	15.81%
Mixed Race/Multi-Racial (NH)	1,185	1,320	2,219	1.92%	2.56%	5.02%
Some Other Race alone (NH)	116	72	271	0.19%	0.14%	0.61%
Asian alone (NH)	197	145	184	0.32%	0.28%	0.42%
Native American or Alaska Native alone (NH)	224	180	120	0.36%	0.35%	0.27%
Pacific Islander alone (NH)	6	10	17	0.01%	0.02%	0.04%
Total	61,799	51,508	44,202	100.00%	100.00%	100.00%

=== 2020 census ===
As of the 2020 census, Saginaw had a population of 44,202. The median age was 35.7 years. 26.3% of residents were under the age of 18 and 14.5% of residents were 65 years of age or older. For every 100 females there were 90.7 males, and for every 100 females age 18 and over there were 85.7 males age 18 and over.

99.6% of residents lived in urban areas, while 0.4% lived in rural areas.

There were 18,107 households in Saginaw, of which 30.6% had children under the age of 18 living in them. Of all households, 22.7% were married-couple households, 24.9% were households with a male householder and no spouse or partner present, and 43.6% were households with a female householder and no spouse or partner present. About 36.2% of all households were made up of individuals and 12.1% had someone living alone who was 65 years of age or older.

There were 20,752 housing units, of which 12.7% were vacant. The homeowner vacancy rate was 2.6% and the rental vacancy rate was 9.4%.

Racial composition as of the 2020 census
Race	Number	Percent
White	17,224	39.0%
Black or African American	19,829	44.9%
American Indian and Alaska Native	265	0.6%
Asian	204	0.5%
Native Hawaiian and Other Pacific Islander	17	0.0%
Some other race	2,490	5.6%
Two or more races	4,173	9.4%
Hispanic or Latino (of any race)	6,988	15.8%

=== 2010 census ===
As of the census of 2010, there were 51,508 people, 19,799 households, and 12,252 families residing in the city (excludes townships). The population density was 2,970.5 inhabitants per square mile (1,146.9/km^{2}). There were 23,574 housing units at an average density of 1,359.5 per square mile (524.9/km^{2}). The racial makeup of the city was 46.1% African American, 43.5% White, 0.5% Native American, 0.3% Asian, 5.2% from other races, and 4.4% from two or more races. Hispanic or Latino of any race were 14.3% of the population.

There were 19,799 households, of which 36.0% had children under the age of 18 living with them, 26.9% were married couples living together, 28.7% had a female householder with no husband present, 6.3% had a male householder with no wife present, and 38.1% were non-families. 32.1% of all households were made up of individuals, and 9.5% had someone living alone who was 65 years of age or older. The average household size was 2.52 and the average family size was 3.19.

The median age in the city was 33.5 years. 28.4% of residents were under the age of 18; 10.6% were between the ages of 18 and 24; 25.1% were from 25 to 44; 25% were from 45 to 64; and 10.9% were 65 years of age or older. The gender makeup of the city was 47.1% male and 52.9% female.

=== 2000 census ===
As of the census of 2000, there were 61,799 people, 23,182 households, and 15,114 families residing in the city. The population density was 3,542.9 inhabitants per square mile (1,367.9/km^{2}). There were 25,639 housing units at an average density of 1,469.9 per square mile (567.5/km^{2}). The racial makeup of the city (excluding townships) was 47.02% White, 43.26% African American, 0.49% Native American, 0.33% Asian, 0.02% Pacific Islander, 5.86% from other races, and 3.03% from two or more races. Hispanic or Latino of any race were 11.75% of the population.

There were 23,182 households, out of which 35.4% had children under the age of 18 living with them, 32.9% were married couples living together, 27.3% had a female householder with no husband present, and 34.8% were non-families. 29.5% of all households were made up of individuals, and 9.9% had someone living alone who was 65 years of age or older. The average household size was 2.60 and the average family size was 3.23.

In the city, the population was spread out, with 31.6% under the age of 18, 9.9% from 18 to 24, 28.3% from 25 to 44, 18.7% from 45 to 64, and 11.4% who were 65 years of age or older. The median age was 31 years. For every 100 females, there were 87.2 males. For every 100 females age 18 and over, there were 81.0 males.

The median income for a household in the city was $26,485, and the median income for a family was $29,945. Males had a median income of $31,614 versus $22,714 for females. The per capita income for the city was $13,816. About 24.7% of families and 28.5% of the population were below the poverty line, including 40.2% of those under age 18 and 16.3% of those age 65 and over.

== Economy ==
During much of the 20th century, Saginaw's economy was dominated by manufacturing related to the automotive industry; most notably, manual transmission assemblies, steering gear boxes and power steering pumps. At the height of manufacturing in the 1960s and 1970s, the city and neighboring Buena Vista Township hosted 12 General Motors plants, an Eaton Manufacturing plant (demolished 2008) where 5,000 people produced auto parts, and numerous smaller concerns.

The General Motors plants in the county were:

- The original Jackson-Wilcox factory on Saginaw's North Hamilton (ca. 1906), later Saginaw Steering Gear Plant 1, closed 1984, sold by GM in 1987 to Thomson Industries, still operating as of 2009.
- Chevrolet Saginaw Parts at Sixth and Washington on Saginaw's East Side, built in 1906 as the assembly plant of the Rainier Motor Car Company, acquired by GM in 1907. Closed 1983, demolished 1984.
- Saginaw Malleable Iron on the Southwest Side (1917). Contracted to build gear housings for GM's Jacox division (the former Jackson Wilcox company, later Saginaw Steering Gear), sold to GM in 1919, later part of Saginaw Products Division, reorganized into a new Central Foundry Division in 1946. Closed May 2007, razed in 2010 and for sale as of May 2013 by the RACER Trust, charged with disposing of abandoned GM properties.
- Chevrolet Grey Iron, on the North Side of Saginaw, opened as Central Foundry in 1918, operated by Chevrolet Division 1927–1983, thereafter by GM Powertrain Division. Operating today as Saginaw Metal Casting Operations, the only GM manufacturing division still operating in Saginaw County.
- Chevrolet Saginaw Transmission on East Genesee in Saginaw, built 1919–20 for the Michigan Crankshaft Company, acquired by GM in 1921 and placed under Saginaw Products. Transferred to Chevrolet upon the dissolution of the Crankshaft Division (ca. 1927). Home of the Saginaw 3-speed and 4-speed manual transmissions. Transferred to the Delco Moraine Division in 1984, which became Delphi Automotive in 1995. After 2007, leased and later purchased outright by TRW Automotive, operating as TRW Braking and Suspension until closing in February 2014.
- Saginaw Steering Gear Plant 2, the "Gun Plant" (see below) adjacent to Malleable Iron; opened March 1941, closed July 2001, razed 2002. For sale by RACER Trust as of May 2013.
- The 400-acre Saginaw Steering Gear complex in Buena Vista Township. Plant 3 opened 1953 next to the then-new US-23 bypass, adding Plants 4, 5 and 6 by 1966 and a seventh shortly thereafter. Later known as Saginaw Division, then part of Delphi, sold in 2010 to Nexteer Corporation, is supplying GM, Ford and Chrysler as of 2013.
- Chevrolet Nodular Iron in Buena Vista Township, built 1964–1965, entered production 1967, announced for closure 1986, closed 1988; since demolished. Property for sale by RACER Trust as of May 2013.

The Saginaw metropolitan area's main shopping district is located in neighboring Saginaw Township along Bay Road and Tittabawassee Road north of town, where several big box stores and regional restaurant chains can be found. Also in the same area is Fashion Square Mall, a regional shopping mall anchored by JCPenney and Macy's. Primary areas within the city of Saginaw for consumer shopping include Old Town and downtown.

== Arts and culture ==
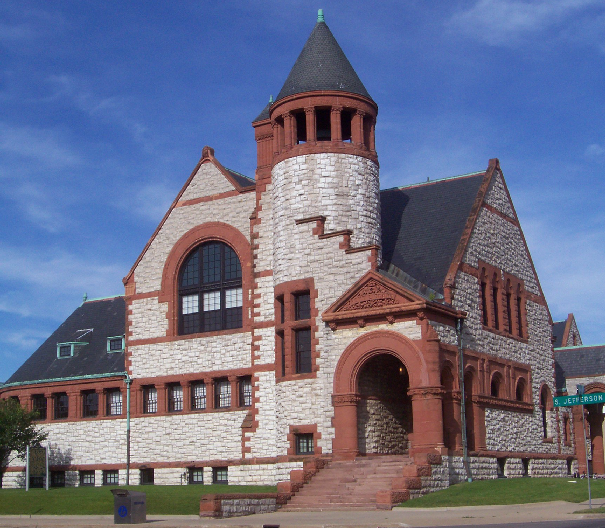
The Hoyt Public Library, pictured here in June 2006, was built in 1887 by Van Brunt & Howe of Boston.

Saginaw's entertainment hub can be found in the downtown area, where venues such as The Dow Event Center and the restored Temple Theatre offer live entertainment. The Saginaw Bay Symphony Orchestra and Saginaw Choral Society are housed in the Temple and each of these organizations performs a full concert series annually at the Temple venue. The Saginaw Historical Society is also located downtown in an elaborate castle. Nearby, the Saginaw Art Museum boasts an impressive permanent collection and recently underwent a massive renovation. The Celebration Square area of downtown boasts an authentic Japanese Tea House, the only one of its kind in Michigan. The Andersen Enrichment Center and Rose Gardens are another attraction in Celebration Square offering ongoing art exhibits, a summer jazz concert series, and winter and summer art fairs. Numerous other arts and cultural organizations serve the community including the Saginaw Arts & Enrichment Commission, Eddy Band, Holidays in the Heart of the City, River Junction Poets, Theodore Roethke House of Poetry, Riverside Film Festival, Lawn Chair Film Festival, Friday Night Live Concerts, River Junction Poets and Saginaw Area Watercolor Society. The Dow Event Center is home to the city's junior ice hockey team, the Saginaw Spirit of the Ontario Hockey League as well as the Saginaw Sting, an indoor football team.

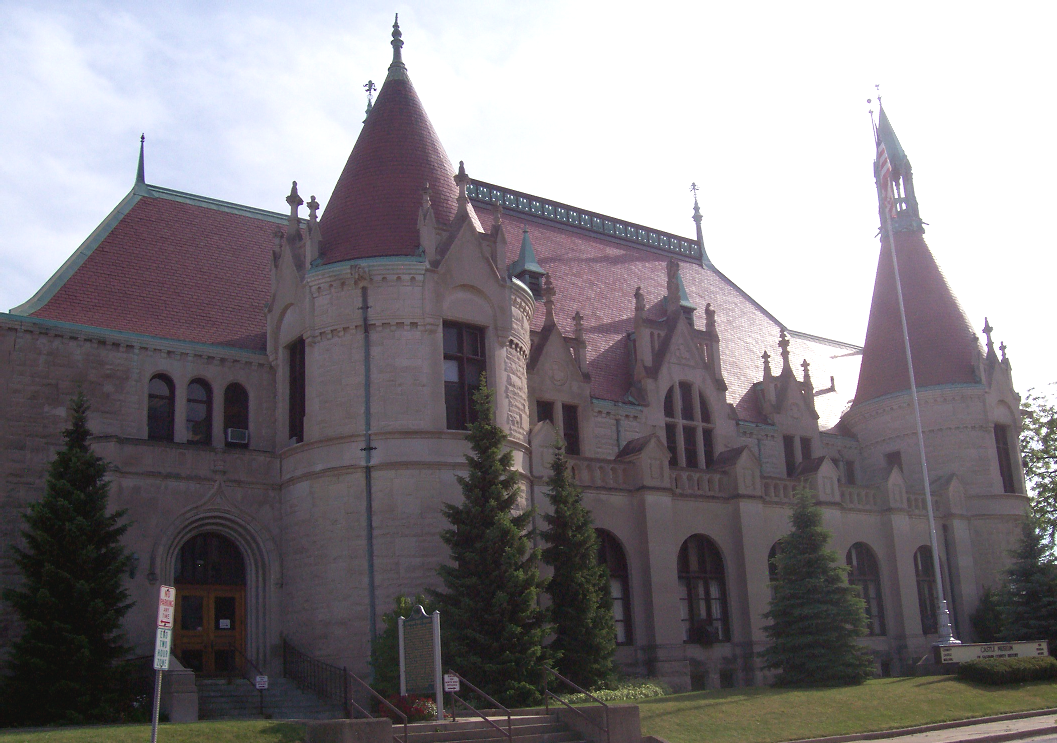
The former East Saginaw Post Office, pictured here in June 2006, is now the site of the Castle Museum of Saginaw County History and is also listed on the National Register of Historic Places.

Downtown Saginaw has undergone a resurgence with locally owned restaurants and coffee shops dotting the area. The downtown Saginaw area contains several office buildings from the late 19th century and early 20th century. They are located near the Saginaw Club, a social club founded in 1889. In December 2016 "The Gallery: Art For Saginaw" opened in the newly redeveloped downtown. At roughly 5,000 square feet it is one of the largest public art galleries in Michigan. The Downtown Farmer's Market offers Michigan produce, flowers, and baked goods from local bakeries and will be moving to an indoor permanent location in 2017. Downtown is not to be confused with the Old Town/West Side City area located on the other side of the river and about one mile (1.6 km) southwest. Old Town has many popular bars, locally owned restaurants, and businesses. The city's roster of local arts organizations includes Pit and Balcony, one of the oldest continuously operating community theaters in the United States, founded in 1932.

=== Parks and museums ===
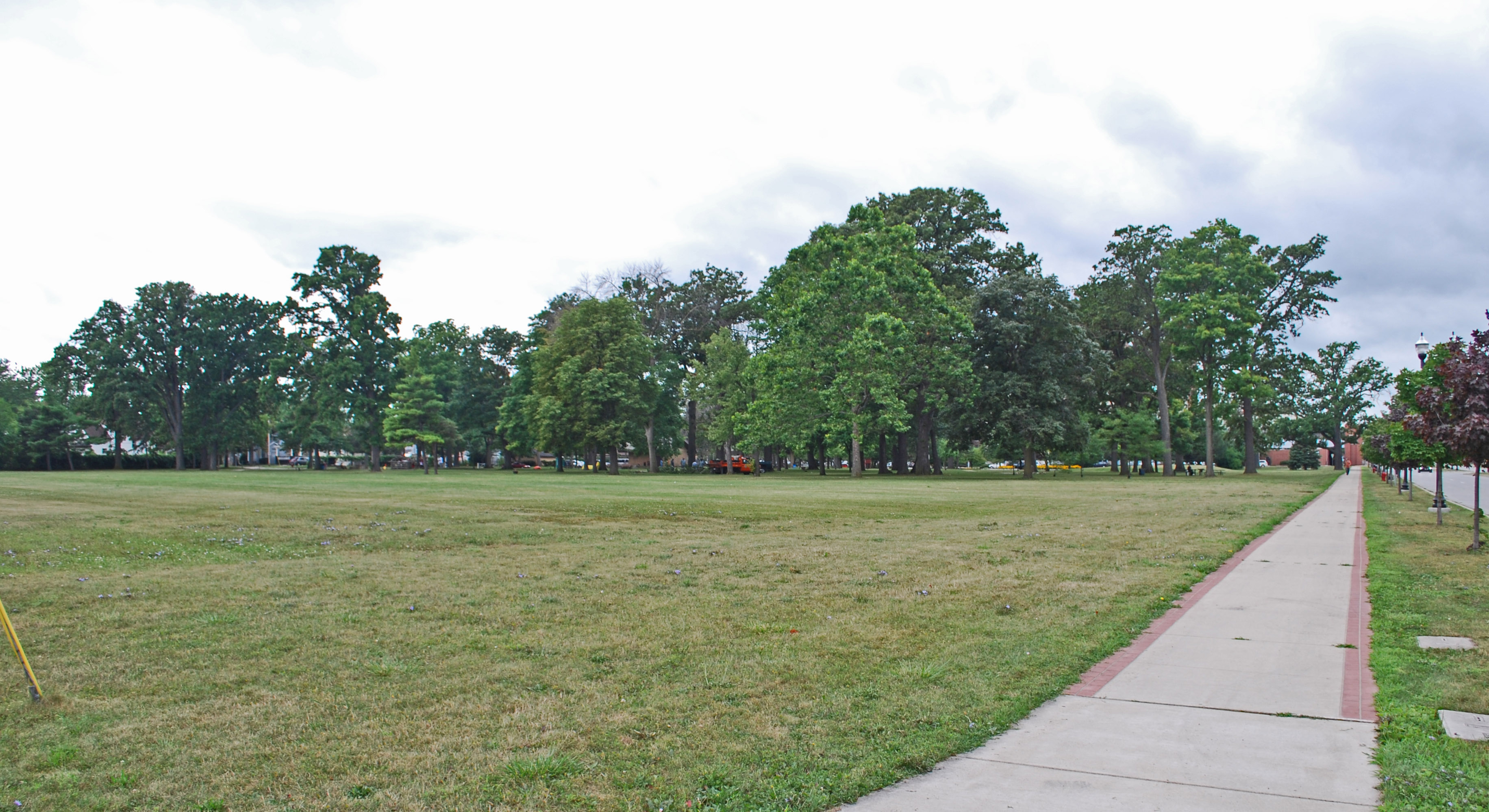
Bliss Park, July 2010

The Castle Museum of Saginaw County History is an important and prominent museum in downtown Saginaw. The museum is housed in a former post office which was built to resemble a castle, and pays homage to the historical French heritage of the area. With more than 100,000 artifacts in its collection, the Historical Society of Saginaw County displays items from their collection as well as those of traveling exhibits.

The Andersen Enrichment Center and Lucille E. Andersen Memorial Rose Garden are part of Saginaw's park system. The facility is used to host private and public events throughout the year. These events include Hollyday Art Fair, Art & Garden Festival, the SAWA Fall Watercolor Exhibition, Jazz in the Rose Garden and Art @ the Andersen and a World AIDS Day service The garden includes a fountain with a sculpture by Marshall Fredericks.

The Saginaw Art Museum hosts temporary exhibitions and permanent collections. The museum also houses The John and Michele Bueker Research Library and Archives of Michigan Art. The museum originated as the home of C.L. Ring who commissioned Charles A. Platt to design the house and gardens. The museum opened to the public in 1948. The museum is a Smithsonian Institution affiliate.

Saginaw is home to a Japanese Cultural Center, Tea House and Garden, as a result of its 52-year Sister-City relationship with Tokushima, Japan. The Garden was completed in 1971. The Tea House, known as Saginaw Awa An, completed in 1986, is considered to be one of the ten most authentic Tea Houses outside the country of Japan. The site is open from April through October and offers traditional tea ceremonies by appointment, and on the second Saturday of each month. Each year in September a Japan Festival is held in the garden, featuring authentic Japanese singers, dancers, and performers, and offering demonstrations of Japanese Culture to those in attendance, including flower arranging, calligraphy, origami, and authentic Japanese cuisine, such as sushi and other dishes.

The city is also home to the Theodore Roethke Home Museum, a National Literary Landmark. The museum honors one of America's greatest 20th-century poets, who was born and raised in Saginaw.

Ojibway Island in the Saginaw River is home to Rust Park and the Ojibway Island City Park Amphitheater.

=== Sports ===
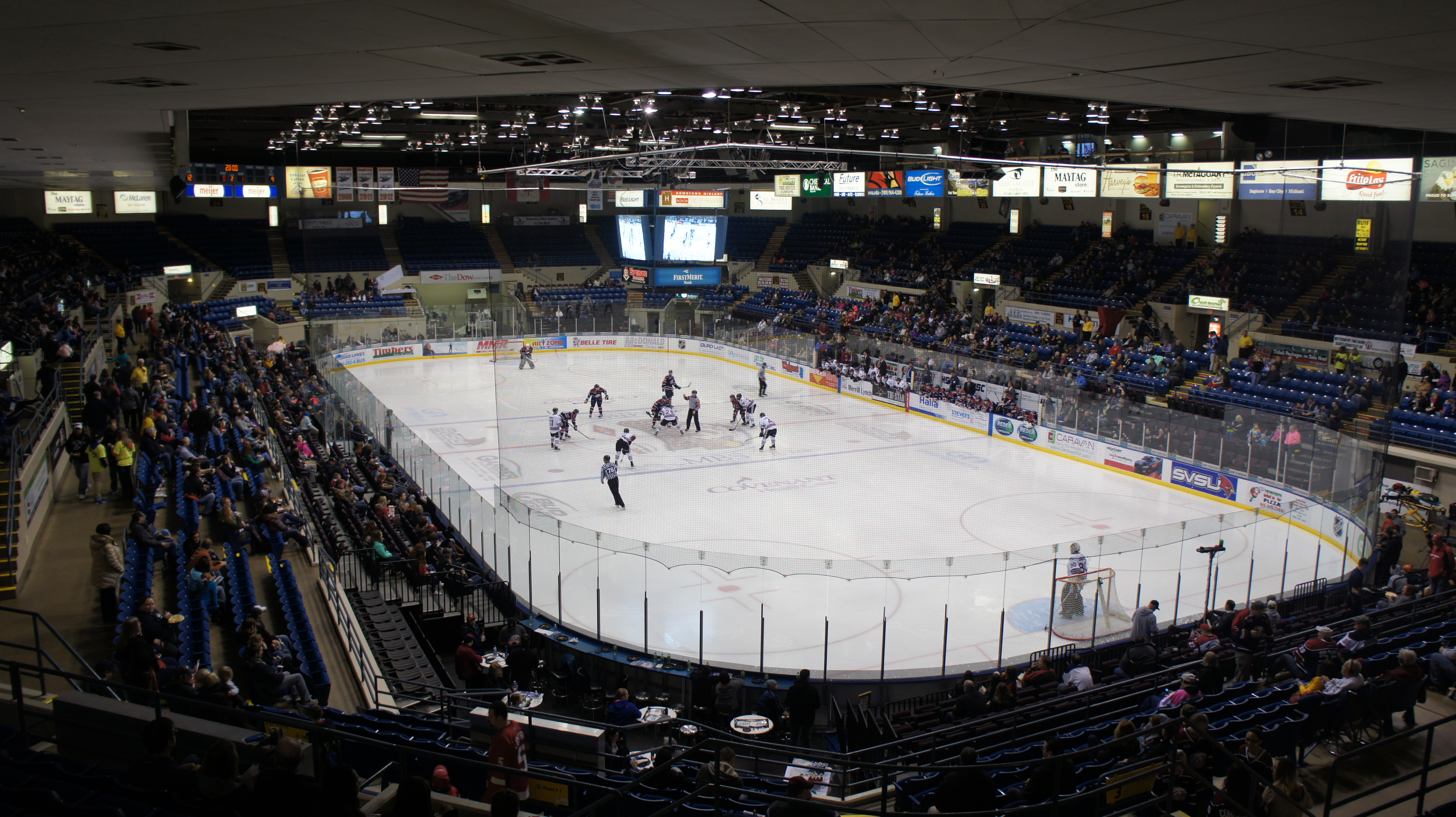
The Saginaw Spirit play the Guelph Storm at the Dow Event Center during an Ontario Hockey League game, January 2016

The Saginaw area is home to a major junior hockey team, a minor league basketball team, and one NCAA Division-II school that has various sports programs.

The Saginaw Spirit is an Ontario Hockey League team that became nationally known when television personality Stephen Colbert promoted the team on his show, The Colbert Report. The Spirit hosted and won the 2024 Memorial Cup.

Saginaw Sting was an indoor football team that formed in 2007 to play in Saginaw beginning in the 2008 season and is currently on hiatus.

The Saginaw Soul are a Basketball Super League team that will begin play in 2025.

At the collegiate level, Saginaw Valley State University competes in numerous sports such as American football, Basketball, and Volleyball.

Team	Sport	League	Year founded	Venue
Saginaw Spirit	Ice hockey	Ontario Hockey League	2002	Dow Event Center
Saginaw Soul	Basketball	Basketball Super League	2025	TBA
Saginaw Valley State University	Various	Great Lakes Intercollegiate Athletic Conference	1963	SVSU Campus

== Government ==
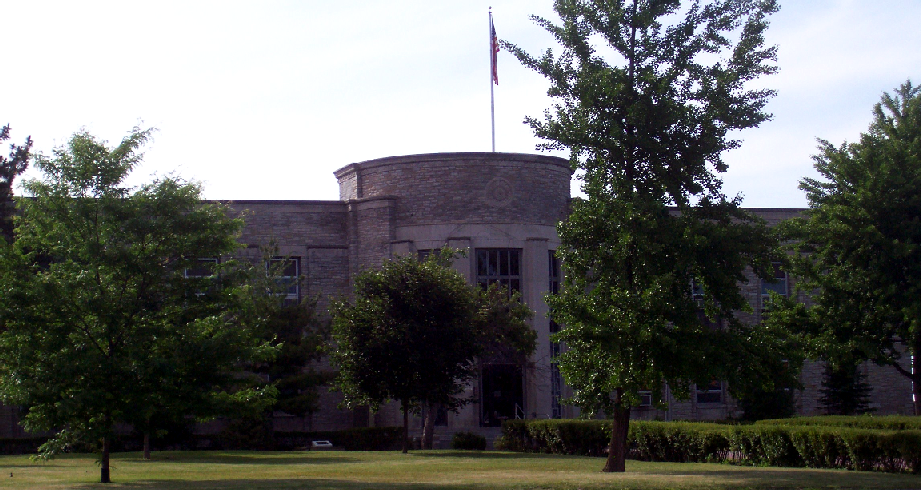
Saginaw City Hall

Saginaw is classified as a Home Rule City under the Michigan Home Rule Cities Act adopting its own city charter giving its city a council-manager form of government. The present charter was adopted in 1935 and took effect on January 6, 1936. Pursuant to the City Charter, Saginaw is governed by a nine-member elected at-large Council. The term of office for a member of the City Council is four years commencing with the first meeting following a regular municipal election. The terms are staggered so the entire Council is not subject to re-election at the same time—either four or five members are elected in each odd-numbered year. The city levies an income tax of 1.5 percent on residents and 0.75 percent on nonresidents.

== Education ==
=== Primary and secondary schools ===
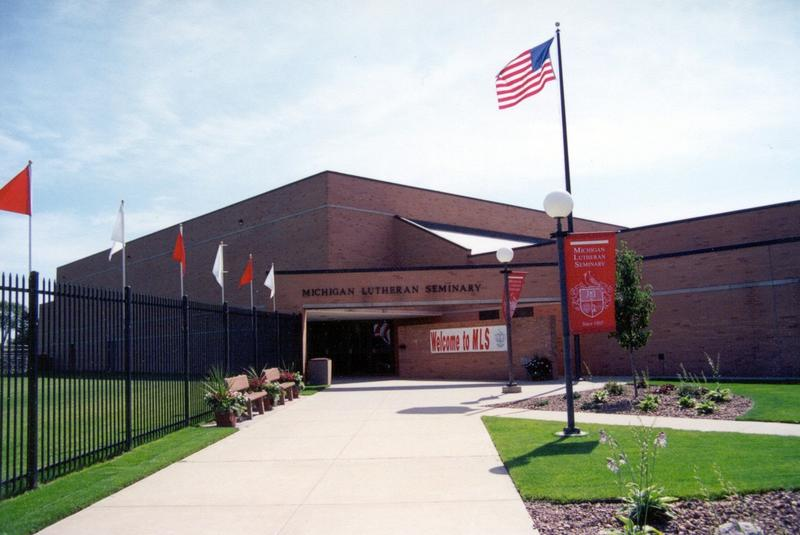
Michigan Lutheran Seminary, the only private high school in Saginaw

The city of Saginaw is served by the Saginaw Public Schools, also known as SPSD. The Saginaw Public School District operates twelve elementary schools, two combined elementary/middle schools, two middle schools, one combined middle/high school, and one high school. The district is governed by a seven-member elected board of education. The board selects a superintendent for the district. The current superintendent is Dr. Ramont M. Roberts. The two public high schools in Saginaw are Saginaw United High School and the Saginaw Arts and Sciences Academy. Michigan Lutheran Seminary is the lone private high school in the city. Charter schools in the city are Saginaw Learn to Earn Academy, North Saginaw Charter Academy, Francis Reh Academy, Saginaw Prep schools, and the International Academy of Saginaw.

=== Higher education ===
Saginaw is served by Delta College and Saginaw Valley State University, which are located in nearby University Center, Michigan. Central Michigan University maintains an off-campus center inside the city that offers numerous degree programs. Delta College built a downtown satellite facility that opened in the fall of 2019.

== Media ==
=== Television stations ===
Saginaw is part of Nielsen's Flint-Saginaw-Bay City-Midland Designated Market Area which is the 66th largest market in the United States for Television Viewers. Saginaw is the home of CBS affiliate WNEM which maintains its studios and offices inside the city though its license is for Bay City, MI. ABC affiliate WJRT maintains its offices and newsrooms in Saginaw while its studios are in its community of license, Flint. Only WEYI (a former NBC affiliate that is now affiliated with Roar) and Christian station WAQP have the City of Saginaw as their city of record but both maintain their facilities outside of the city. Charter Communications operates a cable television network servicing the City of Saginaw under a franchise agreement.

Television stations in the Saginaw, Michigan area (Ascending order)
Channel	Call letters	Network	Comments
5	WNEM-TV	CBS; MyNetworkTV (DT2)	Licensed to Bay City; studios in Saginaw
12	WJRT-TV	ABC	Based and licensed in Flint
19	WDCQ-TV	PBS	Licensed to Bad Axe; studios at Delta College in University Center
24	W24DL-D	3ABN	Based and licensed in Saginaw; programmed via satellite
25	WEYI-TV	Roar	Licensed to Saginaw; studios in Clio
46	WBSF	The CW	Licensed to Bay City; studios in Clio
49	WAQP	TCT	Based and licensed in Saginaw
66	WSMH	Fox; NBC (DT2)	Based and licensed in Flint

=== Radio stations ===
Saginaw and Saginaw Township are home to the three major radio station clusters serving the Greater Tri Cities. Those include family owned and Saginaw-headquartered MacDonald Broadcasting, and corporate broadcasters Alpha Media and Cumulus Media. Radio stations licensed within the immediate Saginaw area are listed. Many locations in the City of Saginaw also receive stations from Bay City, Midland, Flint, and Lansing.

AM radio stations
Frequency	Call sign	Name	Format	Owner	City
790 AM	WSGW	Newsradio 790	News/Talk	Alpha Media	Saginaw
1250 AM	WJMK	MeTV FM	Oldies	Northern States Broadcasting Corporation	Bridgeport
1400 AM	WSAM	The Bay 1400 AM and 104FM	Adult Contemporary	MacDonald Broadcasting	Saginaw

FM radio stations
Frequency	Call sign	Name	Format	Owner	City
90.9 FM	WTRK	Air 1	Contemporary Christian	Educational Media Foundation	Freeland
93.3 FM	WKQZ	The Rock Station, Z93	Modern rock	Cumulus Media	Midland; studios in Saginaw
93.7 FM	WRCL	Club 93.7	Rhythmic contemporary	Townsquare Media	Frankenmuth; studios in Burton
94.5 FM	WCEN-FM	94.5 The Moose	Country music	Alpha Media	Hemlock; studios in Saginaw
96.1 FM	WHNN	My 96.1	Adult Contemporary	Cumulus Media	Bay City; studios in Saginaw
98.1 FM	WKCQ	98.1 KCQ	Country music	MacDonald Broadcasting	Saginaw
100.5 FM	WSGW-FM	FM Talk 100.5	News/Talk	Alpha Media	Carrollton; studios in Saginaw
102.5 FM	WIOG	The Hit Music Channel	Contemporary hits	Cumulus Media	Bay City; studios in Saginaw
104.5 FM	WILZ	Wheelz 104.5	Classic rock	Cumulus Media	Saginaw
106.3 FM	WGER	106.3 The Core	Modern rock	Alpha Media	Saginaw
107.1 FM	WTLZ	KISS 107.1	Urban adult contemporary	Alpha Media	Saginaw

=== Newspapers ===
- The Saginaw News—Tuesday, Thursday, Friday, Sunday
- Review Magazine— biweekly
- The Saginaw Press—weekly
- The Township Times—weekly
- The Township View—weekly

== Infrastructure ==
=== Transportation ===
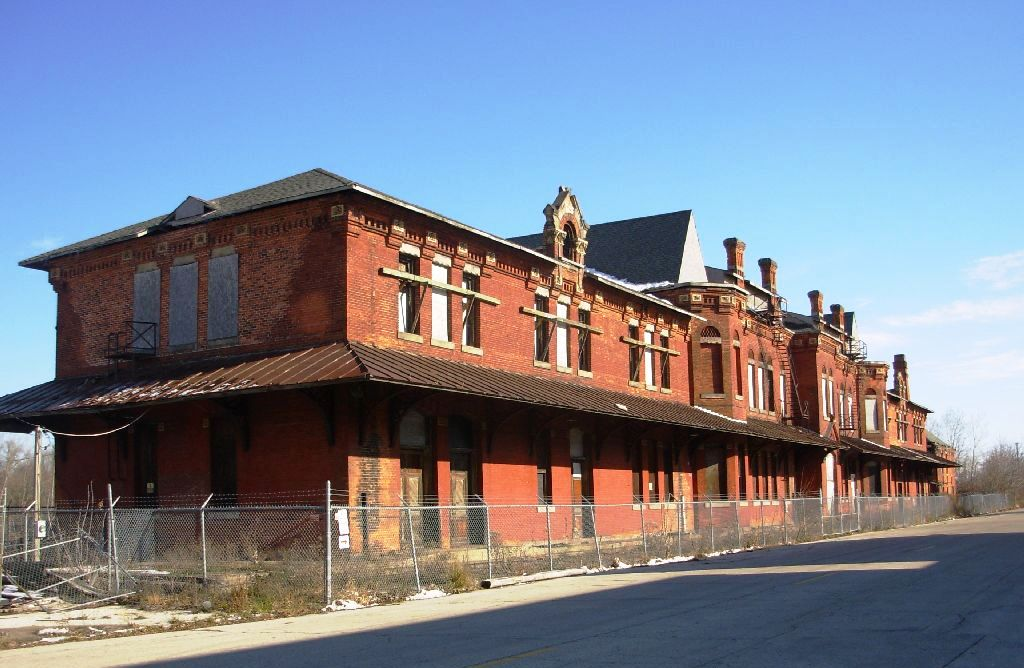
The abandoned Flint and Pere Marquette Railroad East Saginaw Depot

Historically, ships were able to move along the length of the river inside the city, but fixed bridges built over the river closed access south of the northern docks.

Saginaw was a railroad hub to the Pere Marquette Railway. Freight and passenger routes radiated to Bay City to the north, Port Huron to the east, Toledo to the south, Grand Rapids and Chicago to the southwest and Ludington to the west. Grand Trunk Railroad ran trains from Bay City through Saginaw to Durand, for connections to Chicago, Detroit, Port Huron and Toronto. Most passenger routes were discontinued during the 1950s. The last route to Potter Street Station was in 1950. The station was designated a historic site in 1991. The last New York Central Railroad train (formerly Michigan Central Railroad) departed the Genesee Street Station bound for Detroit in 1964. Today, Saginaw hosts the headquarters of the Lake State Railway who continues to operate trains out of the massive former Pere Marquette Saginaw Yard to destinations that include Midland, Bay City, and Plymouth. The Huron and Eastern Railway operates the former GTW mainline through the city, which intersects with Lake State's Midland Line at Mershon Junction. HESR also operates several lines east into the thumb region towards Vassar and Reese. The Mid-Michigan Railroad plays a bit part in the region as well, interchanging with Lake State at Paines, west of the city. The Saginaw Railway Museum, located on the west side of the city, continues to work towards the preservation of the Saginaw Bay area's railroading history.

Saginaw is served primarily by two airports: MBS International Airport, located in nearby Freeland, and Bishop International Airport, located in Flint. Saginaw is also served by three smaller airports: Harry W. Browne Airport in adjacent Buena Vista Township, James Clements Municipal Airport in Bay City, and Jack Barstow Municipal Airport in Midland.

Interstate 75 (I-75) serves as the main arterial route for the Saginaw area while I-675 provides direct access to the center of the city from I-75. I-69 is a nearby east–west corridor providing access to the rest of the Midwestern United States and Canada. The Saginaw River runs through the middle of the city and provides access to Saginaw Bay and the rest of the Great Lakes via docks on the northern side of the city.

In the city and surrounding areas, mass transit is provided by bus under the authority of the Saginaw Transit Authority Regional Services (STARS) system. The STARS system connects to Bay City's Bus system at Saginaw Valley State University.

Intercity Bus Service is Provided by Indian Trails, which operates a bus station on the east side of the river.

==== Major highways ====
- I-75 passes along the eastern side of the city through Buena Vista Charter Township.
- I-675 provides a short freeway loop through downtown Saginaw and back to I-75 through Saginaw Charter Township.
- M-13 runs from I-69 through downtown Saginaw and north to Standish.
- M-46 is a cross-peninsular road, running across the mitten and the thumb—from Port Sanilac on the Lake Huron shore, through Saginaw, and then on to Muskegon on the Lake Michigan shore. This east–west surface route nearly bisects the Lower Peninsula of Michigan latitudinally.
- M-47 passes through the western suburbs and provides a direct connection to MBS International Airport.
- M-52 runs from the Ohio border through Adrian and Owosso before ending at M-46, in the western suburbs of Saginaw. M-52 also provides an alternate connection to Lansing, Michigan's state capitol.
- M-58 runs from M-47 to I-675.
- M-81 runs east from M-13 to Caro and Cass City and ends at M-53 in Sanilac County.
- M-84 runs from downtown Bay City to M-58 in Saginaw.

=== Utilities ===
The Saginaw water treatment facility, pictured here in June 2006, was constructed in 1929.

The City of Saginaw gets its electricity and natural gas from Consumers Energy.

In 1929, the city opened its consolidated water works plant which replaced two separate plants that were on each side of the Saginaw river. This plant treated water brought in from the Saginaw river and piped it out to the residents as well as corner pumps for people that did not have direct connections to the system. Currently, the City of Saginaw jointly owns with the City of Midland the Saginaw-Midland Municipal Water Supply Corporation. Incorporated in 1946, this water treatment system has supplied drinking and industrial water to both cities and many surrounding areas within the county. Due to brackish water in the aquifers below both cities, a 65-mile-long (105 km) pipeline was constructed in 1948 to supply water from Lake Huron at White Stone Point, north of Au Gres to water treatment plants in Saginaw and Midland with a second pipe added by 1996. This system has played a role in the decline of the city. The City of Saginaw, in order to obtain new sources of revenue, sold water to areas outside of the city (especially to the Saginaw Charter Township). This caused numerous businesses inside the city to leave for the surrounding areas and development in the city to stagnate. The City of Midland, however, adopted a policy of "No Annexation, No Water" which has led to the growth of the city as well as the surrounding areas.

=== Healthcare ===
Aleda E. Lutz Veterans Affairs Medical Center, located at 1500 Weiss, is a hospital serving America's Veterans overseen by the Veterans Health Administration. It has 100 staffed beds and sees 292,000 patients a year.

Covenant Medical Center, located at 1447 North Harrison, is a 623-bed hospital with inpatient and outpatient facilities including an emergency department that provides 95,000 visits per year and is the region's primary trauma center. Lifenet offers helicopter air ambulance services from the Covenant campus.

Mary Free Bed and Covenant HealthCare combined their expertise to establish Mary Free Bed at Covenant HealthCare, aiming to provide advanced rehabilitation services to the Great Lakes Bay Region. The collaboration leverages the strengths of both organizations to offer specialized care and state-of-the-art rehabilitation technology. The partnership became operational in 2018, later investing in the Saginaw community with a new $40.7M building in 2021.

It is the location for "CMU Medical Education Partners", which offers various residency training programs. It also offers walk-in clinics and facilities scattered throughout the county for outpatient surgery, breast cancer diagnosis, physical therapy, sports medicine and eye care.

MyMichigan Medical Center Saginaw, located at 800 South Washington, is a hospital with approximately 225 staffed beds and sees 168,000 patients a year. It treats trauma, heart disease, and cancer among other ailments, and opened its Ambulatory Care Center in Saginaw Township in 2000 featuring the county's first suburban emergency room.

== In popular culture ==
- Saginaw is referred to in the Brian D'Arcy James song: "Michigan Christmas". Brian grew up in Saginaw, Michigan.
- Bill Anderson and Don Wayne wrote a song entitled "Saginaw, Michigan" which has been covered by a dozen artists. Cowboy singer Lefty Frizzell was the first to perform it, with his version reaching number one on the country charts. It was also popularly performed by George Jones. (Note: The song mis-situates the city on Saginaw Bay, about 15 miles to the north.)
- Saginaw served as the destination point for the Seinfeld characters Kramer and Newman during an episode where the pair hatched a scheme to transport bottles and cans via a United States Postal Service mail truck from New York to Michigan to earn 10¢ per recycled item, as opposed to New York's 5¢.
- In an episode of The CW Television Network's television series, Supernatural, brothers Sam and Dean investigate a murder meant to look like a suicide in Saginaw.
- "The Saginaw Song" is the title of a poem by Theodore Roethke, a poet who was born in Saginaw in 1908.
- Saginaw and the Saginaw Valley was a center for songwriting. The well-known tunes "All of Me", "Toot Toot Tootsie", "It Had to Be You", "After the Ball", "I'm Forever Blowing Bubbles", "Stand Up Stand Up for Jesus", and many others were either written or co-written by songwriters from Saginaw. More modern examples include "Only Women Bleed" and the catalog of Saginaw native Stevland Morris, aka Stevie Wonder, Dick Wagner, and Rudy Martinez ("96 Tears").
- The 1966 Paul Simon song "America" includes the line, "It took me four days to hitch-hike from Saginaw". According to an article in Michigan Live, Simon wrote the song when he was in the city.

== Sister cities ==
- Amanokrom, Akuapim North District, Ghana
- Awka, Anambra, Nigeria
- Cambridge, Ontario, Canada
- Tokushima, Tokushima Prefecture, Japan
- Zapopan, Jalisco, Mexico

== See also ==
- Saginaw Trail
