= M-58 (Michigan highway) =

State highway in Saginaw County, Michigan, United States

M-58
- M-58 highlighted in red

Route information
- Maintained by MDOT
- Length: 5.108 mi (8.221 km)
- Existed: 1971–present

Major junctions
- West end: M-47 near Shields
- M-84 at Saginaw
- East end: I-675 at Saginaw

Location
- Country: United States
- State: Michigan
- Counties: Saginaw

Highway system
- Michigan State Trunkline Highway System; Interstate; US; State; Byways
← M-57	→ M-59

M-58 is a 5.108-mile-long (8.221 km) east–west state trunkline highway in the US state of Michigan that runs from M-47 in Saginaw Township east to exit 3 of Interstate 675 (I-675) near the north part of downtown Saginaw. The trunkline follows State Street through the Saginaw area, and east of Lathrop Avenue, M-58 is split along two streets, using Davenport Avenue as well. This is the third time that the number has been used on a highway in Michigan; the first two were used in the Berrien County and Pontiac areas. The Saginaw version was designated in 1971, and it is listed on the National Highway System.

== Route description ==
M-58 starts at an intersection with M-47 (Midland Road) near the Tittabawassee River in Saginaw Township. It runs east on State Street through a commercial area in the township. Continuing east, the adjoining properties transition to residential buildings. Between Avalon and Lathrop avenues, M-58 splits into a one-way pairing of streets: eastbound traffic continues along State Street, but westbound traffic uses Davenport Avenue, one block to the north. Just east of this split, M-58 crosses into the City of Saginaw at Passolt Street.

In Saginaw, the two parallel streets continue east and meet M-84 which runs north–south along Bay Street. The distance between the two parallel streets decreases east of North Carolina Street when Davenport Avenue shifts to the south. The intersection with Hill Street marks the beginning of the connections to the exit 3 interchange along a bend in the I-675 freeway. Hill Street is one-way carrying traffic southbound exiting from southbound I-675 to either direction of M-58. Two blocks east, Michigan Avenue carries traffic northbound under the freeway, connecting to a ramp to northbound I-675 before continuing north through the city of Saginaw. East of this intersection, State Street curves to the north, intersecting Davenport Avenue and merging into the ramp for southbound I-675. A loop ramp across the freeway provides access from northbound I-675 to Davenport Avenue. This interchange complex marks the eastern terminus of M-58.

M-58 is maintained by the Michigan Department of Transportation (MDOT) like other state highways in Michigan. As a part of these maintenance responsibilities, the department tracks the volume of traffic that uses the roadways under its jurisdiction. These volumes are expressed using a metric called annual average daily traffic, which is a statistical calculation of the average daily number of vehicles on a segment of roadway. MDOT's surveys in 2009 showed that the highest traffic levels along M-58 were the 28,648 vehicles daily east of the split at Lathrop Avenue; the lowest counts were the 18,827 vehicles per day by the I-675 interchange . All of M-58 has been listed on the National Highway System, a network of roads important to the country's economy, defense, and mobility.

== History ==
=== Previous designations ===
On July 1, 1919, the first M-58 was a 24-mile (39 km) highway in Berrien County connecting M-40 (now M-51) in downtown Niles with M-11 (later US Highway 12 [US 12], and presently Business Loop I-94) south of downtown St. Joseph. On November 11, 1926, the entire length was redesignated as a part of US 31. From 1930 through 1961, a second iteration of M-58 existed in Oakland County as a western bypass around Pontiac; the route ran from US 10 at the corner of Woodward Avenue and Square Lake Road south of Pontiac west to Telegraph Road and then north along Telegraph road to US 10 (Dixie Highway) north of Pontiac.

=== Current designation ===
This route is the third iteration of M-58 in Michigan. This route came into being when the western segment of M-81 was redesignated in 1971 following the completion of I-675 into downtown Saginaw. The routing has remained unchanged since designation.

== Major intersections ==
The entire highway is in Saginaw County.

Location	mi	km	Destinations	Notes
Saginaw Charter Township	0.000	0.000	M-47 – Midland, Shields	
Saginaw	3.554	5.720	M-84 north – Bay City	Southern terminus of M-84
Saginaw	5.108	8.221	I-675 – Bay City, Flint	Exit 3 on I-675; roadway continues east as Davenport Avenue
1.000 mi = 1.609 km; 1.000 km = 0.621 mi
