= WGER =

Radio station in Saginaw, Michigan

- Saginaw, Michigan; United States
- Broadcast area: Saginaw, Midland, and Bay City metropolitan area
- Frequency: 106.3 MHz
- Branding: 106.3 The Core

Programming
- Format: Classic alternative

Ownership
- Owner: Connoisseur Media; (Alpha Media Licensee LLC)
- Sister stations: WCEN-FM; WSGW; WSGW-FM; WTLZ

History
- First air date: February 18, 1969 (106.3 transmitter); November 12, 1961 (intellectual property, at 102.5)
- Former call signs: Transmitter: WSBM (1969–1975); Intellectual property at 102.5: WNEM-FM (1961–1969); WGER (1969–1986)
- Former frequencies: 102.5 MHz (1961–1986)
- Call sign meaning: James Gerity (original owner)

Technical information
- Licensing authority: FCC
- Facility ID: 20384
- Class: A
- ERP: 4,400 watts
- HAAT: 116 meters (381 ft)
- Transmitter coordinates: 43°28′36.1″N 83°57′5.9″W

Links
- Public license information: Public file; LMS
- Webcast: Listen live
- Website: www.1063thecore.com

WGER (106.3 FM, branded "106.3 The Core") is a radio station licensed to Saginaw, Michigan, broadcasting a classic alternative format. The station broadcasts from a transmitter southeast of I-675 Exit 6 (Tittabawassee Road) in Carrollton Township in Saginaw County.

== History ==
=== Beginnings at 102.5 ===
Established by James Gerity, a professional violinist who acquired WNEM-TV in 1961, WGER began broadcasting later that year at 102.5 MHz under the WNEM-FM calls and featured a beautiful music format for the first couple decades of its existence. The call letters were changed to WGER after Gerity sold the TV station in 1969. WGER's beautiful music format, programmed by TM Programming, achieved high ratings in adult demographics in both the Tri-Cities and Flint markets thanks to its 86,000-watt signal licensed to Bay City. At one point, in 1971, Arbitron research showed that WGER was the second highest-rated radio station in the nation. During this time, Gerity owned several other stations across Michigan, including WABJ and WQTE in Adrian and WPON in Pontiac.

=== Sale and move to 106.3 ===
James Gerity died in 1973. In 1986, Gerity's estate sold WGER to the owner of CHR-formatted WIOG, licensed to Saginaw at 106.3 which was sold to F-B Communications, a company headed by Jack Fitzgerald, who also served as what would become the new WGER 106.3's general manager. In the mid-1980s, the local radio scene was undergoing some major changes, with the Saginaw radio market being enlarged to include Bay and Midland Counties as well as Saginaw County and becoming the Saginaw-Bay City-Midland radio market and with Pinconning-based WFXZ "Foxy 101" entering the CHR fray as a direct competitor to WIOG. As a result, WGER and WIOG swapped frequencies that summer, with WGER moving its easy listening format to 106.3. WGER evolved from easy listening to mainstream AC on 106.3 and eventually took the name "Soft Rock 106.3" by the late 1980s before adopting the moniker "Magic 106.3".

In April 1996, WGER was sold to Fritz Broadcasting, which owned WSGW and WIOG, for $4.2 million. The format remained the same.

By 2005, WGER had evolved from mainstream AC to Hot AC, although it would be several months before the station stopped reporting to Radio & Records/Mediabase 24/7's Adult Contemporary airplay panel and switched to the Hot AC panel. The station added songs like "Fergalicious" by Fergie and "Girl Next Door" by Saving Jane that did not fit the AC format and introduced a "Totally 80's Weekend" while continuing to feature the Soft AC sounds of Delilah at night.

That same year, WGER received an AC competitor when MacDonald Broadcasting changed its adult standards WSAM-AM and oldies WSAG-FM to a Soft AC simulcast called "The Bay," a gold-based Soft AC simulcast meant to fill the void left when WGER migrated to Hot AC. In the summer of 2007, Delilah moved to "The Bay," and WGER became the new home of the John Tesh radio show in the Tri-Cities market. Increased competition from WSAM/WSAG and top-rated oldies/classic hits station WHNN (which had added more '80s music to its playlist), as well as listener perception that the sound of the station was inconsistent, had led to a decline in WGER's ratings over the past several years. The Fall 2007 Arbitron ratings book showed WGER in tenth place 12+ with a 3.3 share; however, by Spring 2008, the station had sunk to a 2.2 share 12+, falling behind Gladwin-based rimshot country station WGDN-FM.

WGER was the first station in the Tri-Cities market to play continuous Christmas music for the holiday season. In 2006, however, the station announced that it would not change to all-Christmas that year because of research that showed its listeners didn't want it, which left the door open for 96.1 WHNN to change to Christmas music, with which it was very successful. In 2007, both WGER and WHNN went all-Christmas shortly after Halloween.

WGER rebranded from "Magic 106.3" to "Mix 106.3" in February 2009. In the years since, the station evolved its format from Hot AC to Adult CHR, with all 1980s music dropped from rotation, many 1990s songs eliminated as well, and a strong current/recurrent orientation, along with a small amount of hip-hop music added in.

Former logo

On September 20, 2022, at noon, after playing "Unstoppable" by Sia, WGER flipped to a classic alternative rock format focused on 1990s and 2000s hits, branded as "106.3 The Core". The first song on The Core was "Plush" by Stone Temple Pilots. With the change, the station added the WRIF Detroit-based Dave & Chuck The Freak for mornings, becoming the first non-Beasley Broadcasting-owned affiliate for the show; Mack joins as midday host after previously hosting that shift at WIOG, and ‘Clay Bird’ Pierce remains as programming director and afternoon host. It calls itself "The rock alternative" in reference to the market's mainstream rock station WKQZ and classic rock station WILZ.
