= Chesaning =

Chesaning can refer to:

- Chesaning, Michigan, a village
- Chesaning Township, Michigan
- USS Chesaning (YTB-769) - a US Navy tugboat
