= Chesaning, Michigan =

- Village
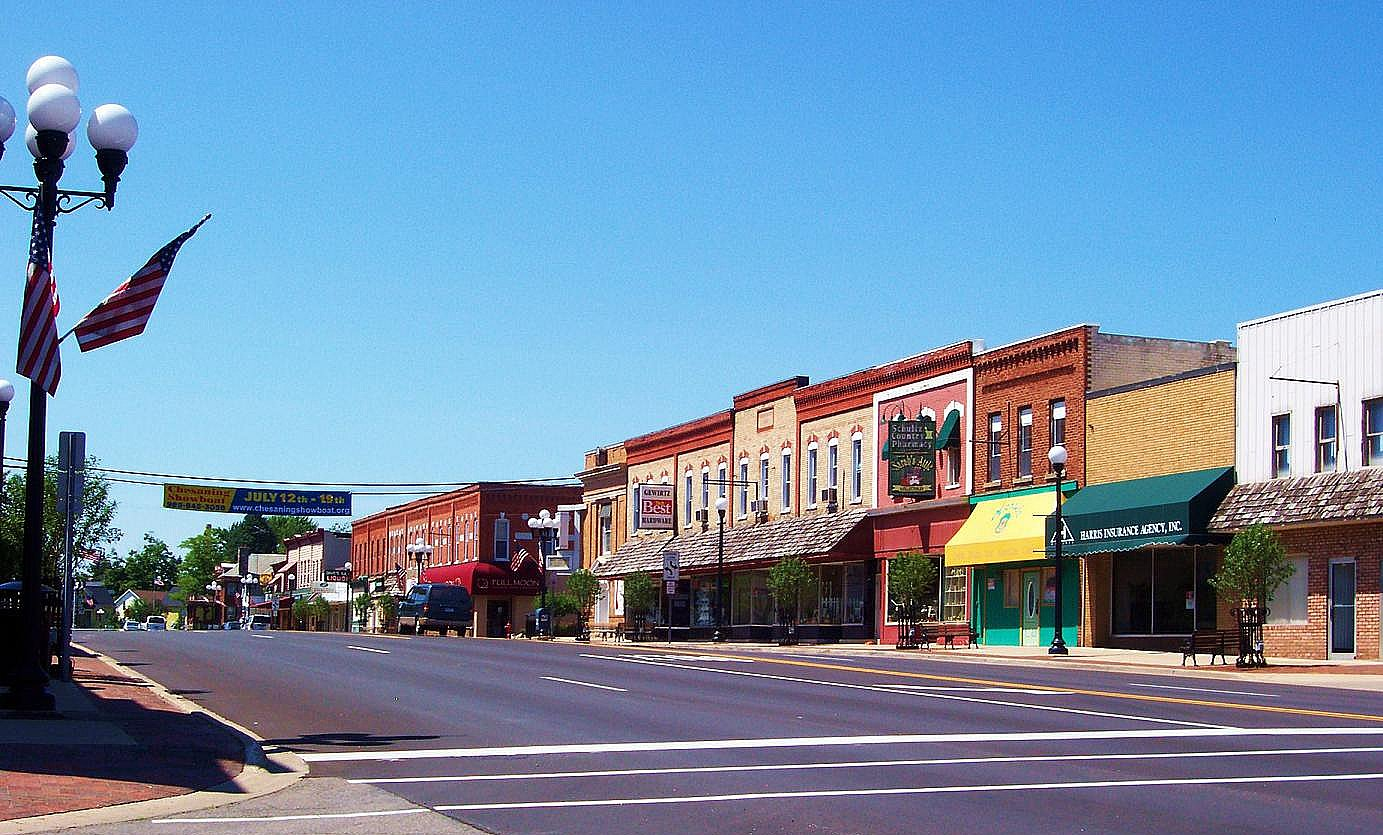
- Looking west along Broad Street

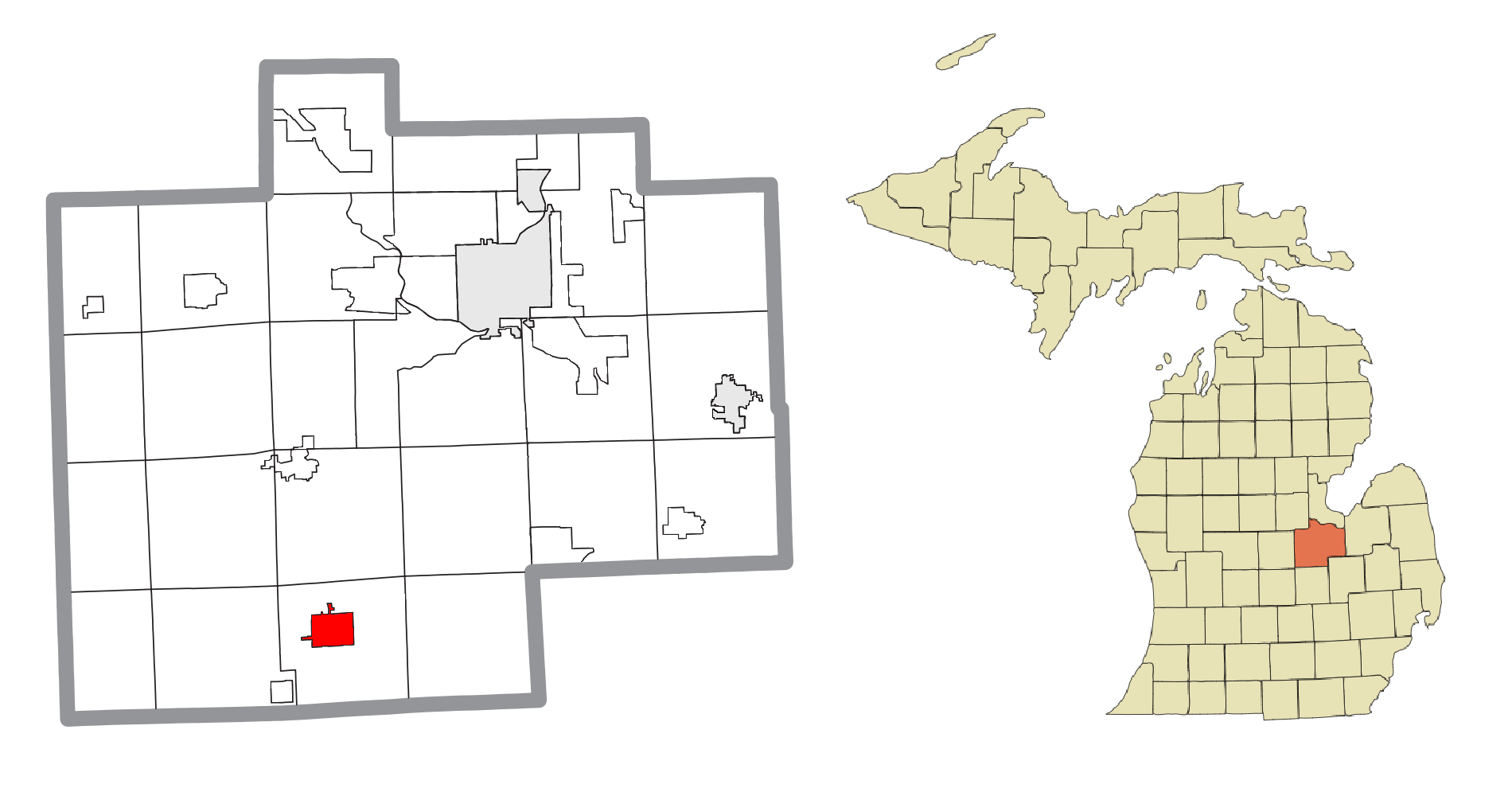
- Location within Saginaw County

- Location within the state of Michigan
- Coordinates: 43°11′05″N 84°07′12″W
- Country: United States
- State: Michigan
- County: Saginaw
- Township: Chesaning

Government
  - Type: Village council
  - Village President: Matthew Hoover
  - President Pro-Tem: Keith Wenzel

Area
  - Total: 3.17 sq mi (8.21 km^{2})
  - Land: 3.08 sq mi (7.98 km^{2})
  - Water: 0.089 sq mi (0.23 km^{2})
- Elevation: 640 ft (200 m)

Population (2020)
  - Total: 2,430
  - Density: 789.0/sq mi (304.65/km^{2})
- Time zone: UTC-5 (Eastern (EST))
  - Summer (DST): UTC-4 (EDT)
- ZIP code: 48616
- Area code: 989
- FIPS code: 26-15140
- GNIS feature ID: 2397613
- Website: Official website

Chesaning (/ˈtʃɛsənɪŋ/ CHESS-ə-ning) is a village in Saginaw County in the U.S. state of Michigan. The population was 2,430 at the 2020 census. The village is located within Chesaning Township.

== History ==
The first mention of Chesaning in the written pages of history is the Saginaw Treaty, signed in 1819. This treaty was between members of the Saginaw Tribe, Chippewa Indians, and the government of the United States. They established a number of reservations, including 10,000 acres (40 km^{2}) along the banks of the Shiawassee River known as "Big Rock Reserve." Chesaning is a Chippewa word meaning "big rock place". The treaty continued in effect until 1837 when a second treaty led to the reserve being surveyed and offered for sale in 1841. The first land was sold at $5 per acre to brothers Wellington and George W. Chapman, and Rufus Mason. After making their land purchase, they traveled back to Massachusetts and moved their families to their new wilderness home by late summer of 1842.

During the months they had been away from their land, several settlers had moved into the area, building a dam and a sawmill. A few years later, a grinding mill was added. The new settlers named their community "Northampton" in honor of the home they had left in Massachusetts. In 1853, the legislature changed the name to Chesaning, the traditional name for the village and township. The first township elections, held in 1847, are considered to be the official birthday of the community. The village, first surveyed in 1851, was organized in 1869. The early business community was located on the east side of the river. The forest setting provided an abundance of lumber, which was used to construct many stores. However, the use of coal heating systems often caused major fires, which destroyed entire blocks of stores. The fires and the arrival of the railroad on the west side community influenced the business area to move on the west side of the river.

The Owosso and Saginaw Navigation Company, organized in 1857 to move merchandise by barge up and down the river, began construction of a canal and lock on the east side of the dam for hauling goods on the river. The river continued to be important for commercial use until the railroad arrived in Owosso. The railroad through Chesaning, built in 1867, was first surveyed to be built approximately three miles west of Chesaning, going directly from Oakley to St. Charles. Luckily, Wellington Chapman donated $18,000, a considerable sum at the time, to the railroad to secure a rail line through Chesaning. The rail was very important to the economy of the village.

== Geography ==
According to the United States Census Bureau, the village has a total area of 3.14 square miles (8.13 km^{2}), of which 3.05 square miles (7.90 km^{2}) is land and 0.09 square miles (0.23 km^{2}) is water.

== Transportation ==
- M-52
- M-57

== Demographics ==
Historical population
Census	Pop.	Note	%±
1870	721		—
1880	889		23.3%
1890	1,056		18.8%
1900	1,244		17.8%
1910	1,363		9.6%
1920	1,387		1.8%
1930	1,594		14.9%
1940	1,807		13.4%
1950	2,264		25.3%
1960	2,770		22.3%
1970	2,876		3.8%
1980	2,656		−7.6%
1990	2,567		−3.4%
2000	2,548		−0.7%
2010	2,394		−6.0%
2020	2,430		1.5%
U.S. Decennial Census

=== 2020 census ===
As of the 2020 census, Chesaning had a population of 2,430. The median age was 40.9 years. 22.6% of residents were under the age of 18 and 21.6% of residents were 65 years of age or older. For every 100 females there were 93.3 males, and for every 100 females age 18 and over there were 87.8 males age 18 and over.

0.0% of residents lived in urban areas, while 100.0% lived in rural areas.

There were 1,058 households in Chesaning, of which 28.4% had children under the age of 18 living in them. Of all households, 39.3% were married-couple households, 19.5% were households with a male householder and no spouse or partner present, and 31.9% were households with a female householder and no spouse or partner present. About 33.1% of all households were made up of individuals and 14.8% had someone living alone who was 65 years of age or older.

There were 1,120 housing units, of which 5.5% were vacant. The homeowner vacancy rate was 1.2% and the rental vacancy rate was 7.6%.

Racial composition as of the 2020 census
Race	Number	Percent
White	2,236	92.0%
Black or African American	11	0.5%
American Indian and Alaska Native	5	0.2%
Asian	8	0.3%
Native Hawaiian and Other Pacific Islander	0	0.0%
Some other race	40	1.6%
Two or more races	130	5.3%
Hispanic or Latino (of any race)	153	6.3%

=== 2010 census ===
As of the census of 2010, there were 2,394 people, 1,015 households, and 628 families living in the village. The population density was 784.9 inhabitants per square mile (303.1/km^{2}). There were 1,129 housing units at an average density of 370.2 per square mile (142.9/km^{2}). The racial makeup of the village was 95.9% White, 0.6% African American, 0.6% Native American, 0.3% Asian, 1.5% from other races, and 1.1% from two or more races. Hispanic or Latino of any race were 4.1% of the population.

There were 1,015 households, of which 30.0% had children under the age of 18 living with them, 44.2% were married couples living together, 12.5% had a female householder with no husband present, 5.1% had a male householder with no wife present, and 38.1% were non-families. 30.9% of all households were made up of individuals, and 13.2% had someone living alone who was 65 years of age or older. The average household size was 2.32 and the average family size was 2.87.

The median age in the village was 39.7 years. 24.1% of residents were under the age of 18; 7.2% were between the ages of 18 and 24; 25.7% were from 25 to 44; 26.1% were from 45 to 64; and 16.8% were 65 years of age or older. The gender makeup of the village was 47.7% male and 52.3% female.

=== 2000 census ===
As of the census of 2000, there were 2,548 people, 1,060 households, and 693 families living in the village. The population density was 818.2 inhabitants per square mile (315.9/km^{2}). There were 1,126 housing units at an average density of 361.6 per square mile (139.6/km^{2}). The racial makeup of the village was 97.80% White, 0.35% African American, 0.24% Native American, 0.08% Asian, 0.04% Pacific Islander, 0.75% from other races, and 0.75% from two or more races. Hispanic or Latino of any race were 3.57% of the population.

There were 1,060 households, out of which 30.0% had children under the age of 18 living with them, 50.4% were married couples living together, 11.9% had a female householder with no husband present, and 34.6% were non-families. 30.9% of all households were made up of individuals, and 15.1% had someone living alone who was 65 years of age or older. The average household size was 2.34 and the average family size was 2.93.

In the village, the population was spread out, with 24.4% under the age of 18, 8.0% from 18 to 24, 27.5% from 25 to 44, 21.7% from 45 to 64, and 18.5% who were 65 years of age or older. The median age was 38 years. For every 100 females, there were 87.1 males. For every 100 females age 18 and over, there were 84.2 males.

The median income for a household in the village was $34,952, and the median income for a family was $51,029. Males had a median income of $38,424 versus $24,635 for females. The per capita income for the village was $19,408. About 7.0% of families and 9.7% of the population were below the poverty line, including 8.0% of those under age 18 and 12.4% of those age 65 or over.

== Education ==
Education in Chesaning had its beginnings during the summer of 1843 when a small board shanty was built on the east side of the river. Eliza Ann Smith was the first teacher. She had 11 pupils, which included her five younger brothers. The first school year was brought to an end when a heavy rainstorm flooded the building and sent the teacher and pupils fleeing to higher ground. The school moved several times over the years, until 1869, when a brick school was built for $14,000. The building was enlarged a few years later. Then a second brick school was constructed on the site of the first brick school and opened in 1918. A gymnasium was added to the school in 1938 and a few years later, a band room. The present high school opened in 1959 and had a capacity of 1,000 students. The building was later enlarged to accommodate 1,200 students. Today, Chesaning Union Schools consists of a high school, a middle school and one elementary school. The district includes a large rural area.

Zion Lutheran School is a grade school (Pre-K-8) of the Wisconsin Evangelical Lutheran Synod in Chesaning.

== Local media ==
Chesaning's local newspaper is the Tri-County Citizen. Founded in 1983, it is a weekly free paper delivered to over 19,000 area homes. Many residents also subscribe to The Saginaw News, The Bay City Times, the Flint Journal, or the Argus-Press out of neighboring Owosso.

Chesaning is an important location for broadcasters in Mid-Michigan, with the community being home to three nearly 1,000 foot communications towers. Flint's WJRT-TV and WSMH as well as Saginaw's WAQP have their antennas and transmitters south of Chesaning. The location gives broadcasters the ability to transmit strong signals to Flint, Saginaw, Bay City, and Lansing.

Radio stations from Saginaw, Flint and Lansing can be received in Chesaning. Exceptionally strong local signals include WSGW, WTLZ, WKCQ and WILZ in Saginaw; WHNN and WIOG in Bay City; and WOAP and WRSR in Owosso.

== Chesaning Showboat Music Festival ==
Chesaning was known for an annual event called the Showboat. This festival was canceled in July 2013, citing lack of funds. The Showboat Committee later filed for Chapter 7 bankruptcy protection.
