= WSGW =

WSGW may refer to:

- WSGW (AM), a radio station (790 AM) licensed to Saginaw, Michigan, United States
- WSGW-FM, a radio station (100.5 FM) licensed to Carrollton, Michigan, United States
