= Wheelz =

Wheelz may refer to:

- Aaron Fotheringham, extreme wheelchair athlete,
- WILZ (104.5 FM), a radio station in Michigan,
- Wheelz, an online casino platform run by Rootz Ltd,
- Wheelz, a company acquired by carsharing company RelayRides
