= WSGW-FM =

Radio station in Carrollton, Michigan

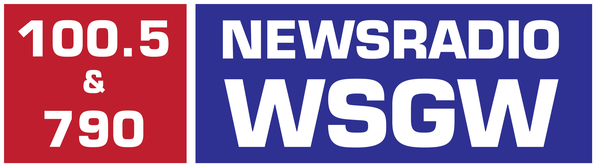
- Carrollton, Michigan; United States
- Broadcast area: Saginaw, Midland, and Bay City metropolitan area
- Frequency: 100.5 MHz
- Branding: 100.5 and 790 Newsradio WSGW

Programming
- Format: News/talk
- Network: ABC News Radio
- Affiliations: Compass Media Networks; Premiere Networks; Westwood One; Saginaw Spirit; SVSU Cardinals football; UM Wolverines football

Ownership
- Owner: Connoisseur Media; (Alpha Media Licensee LLC)
- Sister stations: WCEN-FM; WGER; WSGW; WTLZ

History
- First air date: May 11, 1991; 35 years ago (as WCWK)
- Former call signs: WCWK (1989); WKFK (1989–1991); WTCF (1991–2004); WXQL (2004–2005); WTBT (2005–2006); WSGW-FM (2006–2007); WTKQ-FM (2007–2009)
- Call sign meaning: Saginaw

Technical information
- Licensing authority: FCC
- Facility ID: 41842
- Class: A
- ERP: 3,000 watts
- HAAT: 100 meters (330 ft)
- Transmitter coordinates: 43°33′42.1″N 83°58′51.9″W

Links
- Public license information: Public file; LMS
- Webcast: Listen live
- Website: www.wsgw.com

WSGW-FM (100.5 MHz) is a commercial FM radio station licensed to Carrollton, Michigan, and serving the Saginaw, Midland, and Bay City metropolitan area. It is owned by Connoisseur Media and simulcasts a news/talk radio format with sister station WSGW (790 AM). The two stations identify themselves as "100.5 and 790 Newsradio WSGW". The studios are on Tittabawassee Road in Saginaw.

WSGW-FM is a Class A FM station with an effective radiated power (ERP) of 3,000 watts. The transmitter tower is on Hotchkiss Drive in Frankenlust Township.

== Programming ==
Weekdays on WSGW-FM begin with The Morning Team, a news and interview show hosted by Charlie Rood, Denyse Sharron and Pat Johnson. Veteran broadcaster Art Lewis hosts his own talk show in late mornings, featuring interviews with local newsmakers and phone calls from the public. Agriculture director Terry Henne hosts The Farm Show just before noon, focusing on local weather, market conditions, and agriculture news. The rest of the day, nationally syndicated programs include Markley, Van Camp and Robbins, The Sean Hannity Show, The Tom Sullivan Show, The Ramsey Show with Dave Ramsey, Coast to Coast AM with George Noory and America in the Morning with John Trout.

On weekends, WSGW-FM airs specialty shows on health, money, technology, the outdoors, farming and home repair. Weekend syndicated programs include The Kim Komando Show and Our American Stories with Lee Habeeb, as well as repeats of weekday shows. Most hours begin with an update from CBS News Radio.

Sports programing on WSGW-FM includes the Saginaw Spirit of the Ontario Hockey League and football games of the Saginaw Valley State Cardinals and Michigan Wolverines.

National and international news updates come from CBS News Radio and statewide news from the Michigan News Network. It also airs financial reports from Fox Business, agricultural news from Brownfield, and weather reports from Weatherology.

== History ==
=== The Fox ===
The station signed on the air on May 11, 1991,. as WKFK. It started with an adult contemporary format. As WTCF, it later adopted a long-running and successful Top 40 (CHR) format, known as 100.5 "The Fox".

WTCF was owned by Mid America Broadcasting through most of the 1990s. WTCF enjoyed a large ratings margin on WIOG (which shifted to a hot AC sound around the same time) in the 18-34 demographic. The station was live and featured "Steve and Stacie in the morning", "Steve Williams & Amy Wilde morning show", Rick and Jean Marie in the morning and later McGill in The Morning. Other talent included Mike Cruise in the afternoon, and Greg Fry at night who always started the weekend using the Iggy Pop classic "Wild Child". News veteran/radio personality Lisa Ferrel was the co-host prior to the flip to Pirate Radio. Other morning shows included Leeroy the Love Toy, Rick Dees, Josh & Holly, and Lisa & Dylan in the morning.

=== Pirate Radio ===
In 1998, WTCF was sold to Liggett Broadcasting, owner of WHNN. In 1999, the station adopted the name "Pirate Radio" and shifted its format from Mainstream Top 40 to rhythmic contemporary. Though the station's ratings remained high during the "Pirate Radio" stage, owner Wilks Broadcasting soon shifted the station to hot AC under the moniker "Mix 100".

The move to hot AC was unsuccessful as the station's ratings plummeted. WIOG, which had been a hot AC for most of the 1990s, took advantage of this by returning to CHR and regained some of the ratings ground it had lost to WTCF. A return to Adult Top 40 and "The Fox" moniker failed to raise ratings at 100.5.

=== Kool and The Beat ===
New owners NextMedia Group pulled the plug on "The Fox" in 2004 and changed the format to rhythmic oldies as "Kool 100.5", WXQL. Ratings remained low. A year and a half later, the station became "The Beat", WTBT, with a rhythmic adult contemporary format heavy on dance remixes of CHR/pop hits. The "Beat" format lasted only a few months.

=== Newsradio WSGW ===
The station switched its call letters to WSGW-FM in January 2006. It began airing a talk radio format, simulcasting sister station WSGW (790 AM)'s morning show with separate programming the rest of the day. On August 29, 2007, the call sign was changed to WTKQ-FM and was then changed back to WSGW-FM on January 15, 2009.

NextMedia sold WSGW-FM and the company's 32 other radio stations to Digity, LLC for $85 million. The transaction was consummated on February 10, 2014. Effective February 25, 2016, Digity, LLC and its 124 radio stations were acquired by Alpha Media for $264 million. Alpha Media merged with Connoisseur Media on September 4, 2025.

In June 2019, it was announced that FM 100.5 would simulcast AM 790 weekdays from 1am to Noon. It would also mark the end of longtime mid-morning talk show Listen to the Mrs. Further changes were made to the schedule in December 2020, announcing a merger of FM 100.5 and AM 790's programming, effectively making WSGW-FM a 24-hour simulcast of its sister station with the exception of sporting events. In 2022, longtime program director Dave Mauer and news director Ann Williams resigned from WSGW.
