= Brady Township, Saginaw County, Michigan =

Brady Township, Michigan
- Civil township
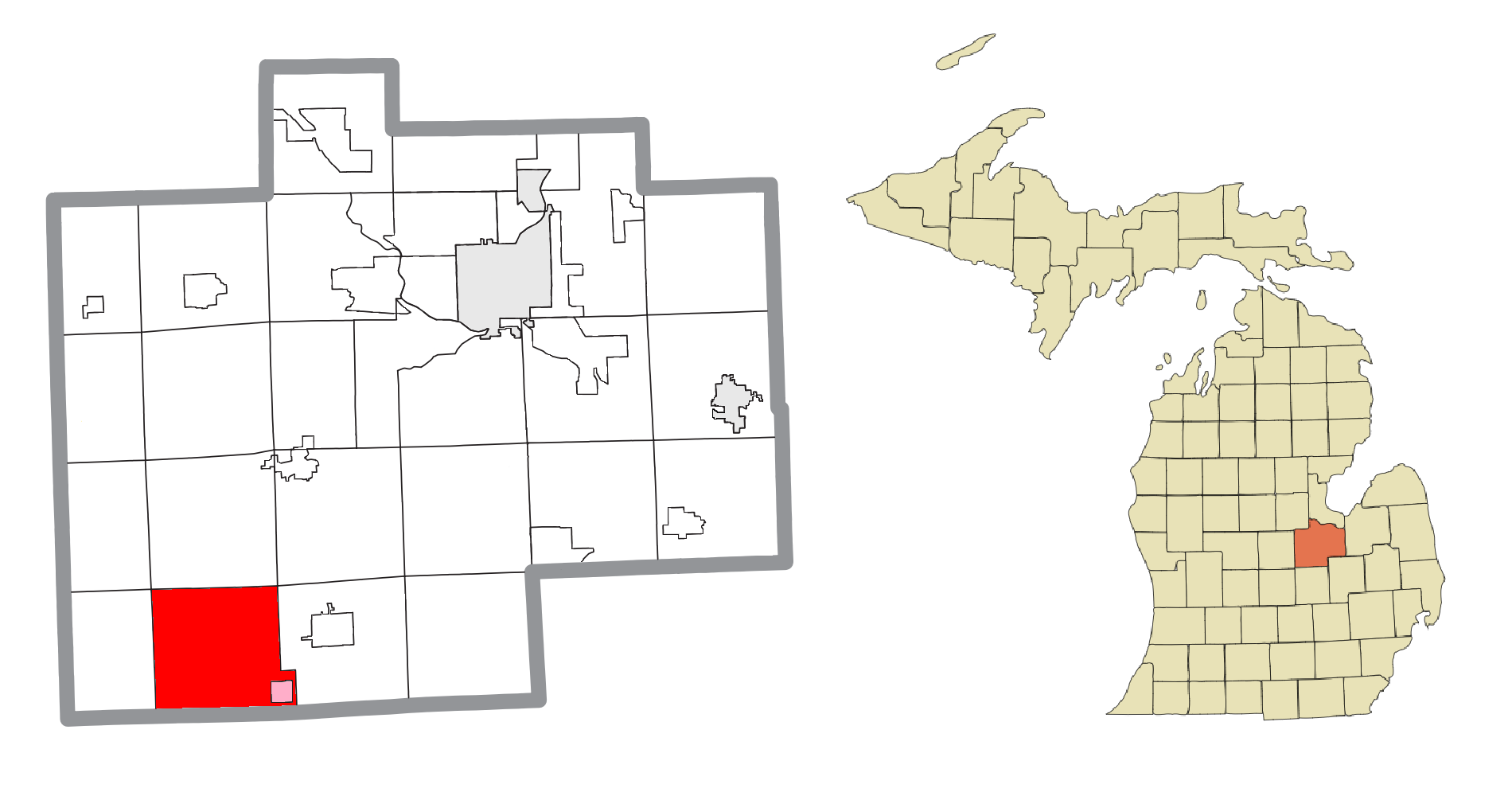
- Location within Saginaw County (red) and the administered village of Oakley (pink)

- Location within the state of Michigan Brady Township (the United States)
- Coordinates: 43°09′53″N 84°13′16″W
- Country: United States
- State: Michigan
- County: Saginaw
- Organized: 1856

Government
  - Supervisor: Steve Kienitz
  - Clerk: Beverly Wenzlick

Area
  - Total: 36.8 sq mi (95.2 km^{2})
  - Land: 36.8 sq mi (95.2 km^{2})
  - Water: 0.039 sq mi (0.1 km^{2})
- Elevation: 666 ft (203 m)

Population (2020)
  - Total: 2,142
  - Density: 58.3/sq mi (22.5/km^{2})
- Time zone: UTC-5 (Eastern (EST))
  - Summer (DST): UTC-4 (EDT)
- ZIP code(s): 48616 (Chesaning); 48649 (Oakley); 48841 (Henderson)
- Area code: 989
- FIPS code: 26-09940
- GNIS feature ID: 1625968
- Website: Official website

Brady Township is a civil township of Saginaw County in the U.S. state of Michigan. As of the 2020 Census, the township population was 2,142.

== History ==
The first school in what is now Brady Township was established in 1855. The Township itself was organized in 1856.

== Communities ==
- Brady Center is an unincorporated community in the township at the intersection of Peet and Hemlock Roads at 43°10′21″N 84°13′38″W.

== Geography ==
According to the United States Census Bureau, the township has a total area of 36.8 square miles (95 km^{2}), of which 36.8 square miles (95 km^{2}) is land and 0.04 square miles (0.10 km^{2}) (0.08%) is water.

== Demographics ==
As of the census of 2000, there were 2,344 people, 862 households, and 655 families residing in the township. The population density was 63.8 inhabitants per square mile (24.6/km^{2}). There were 904 housing units at an average density of 24.6 per square mile (9.5/km^{2}). The racial makeup of the township was 97.44% White, 0.55% African American, 0.17% Native American, 0.34% Asian, 0.04% Pacific Islander, 0.34% from other races, and 1.11% from two or more races. Hispanic or Latino of any race were 2.56% of the population.

There were 862 households, of which 37.2% had children under the age of 18 living with them, 61.7% were married couples living together, 10.1% had a female householder with no husband present, and 23.9% were non-families. 19.5% of all households were made up of individuals, and 8.1% had someone living alone who was 65 years of age or older. The average household size was 2.72 and the average family size was 3.11.

In the township the population was spread out, with 27.6% under the age of 18, 8.8% from 18 to 24, 29.2% from 25 to 44, 23.2% from 45 to 64, and 11.2% who were 65 years of age or older. The median age was 36 years. For every 100 females, there were 99.2 males. For every 100 females age 18 and over, there were 95.2 males.

The median income for a household in the township was $40,565, and the median income for a family was $42,196. Males had a median income of $32,500 versus $21,635 for females. The per capita income for the township was $16,723. About 5.0% of families and 6.1% of the population were below the poverty line, including 6.9% of those under age 18 and 5.7% of those age 65 or over.
