= WMPX =

WMPX may refer to:

- WMPX (AM), an AM radio station broadcasting at 1490 kHz in Midland, Michigan
- WMPX-LD, a low-power television station (channel 18, virtual 33) licensed to serve Dennis, Massachusetts, United States; see List of television stations in Massachusetts
- WPFO Fox 23 in Waterville/Portland, Maine, formerly used WMPX-TV call sign from 1999 to 2002
