= WMRX-FM =

Coordinates: 43.888°N 84.529°W

- Beaverton, Michigan; United States
- Broadcast area: Central Michigan
- Frequency: 97.7 MHz
- Branding: Sunny 97.7/107.7

Programming
- Format: Adult Contemporary

Ownership
- Owner: Michael Chires and Norman McKee; (Black Diamond Broadcast Group, LLC)
- Sister stations: WMPX

History
- First air date: September 15, 1980 (as WGEO-FM)
- Former call signs: WGEO-FM (December 3, 1979-December 14, 1983)

Technical information
- Licensing authority: FCC
- Facility ID: 39674
- Class: A
- ERP: 4,100 watts
- HAAT: 122 meters (400 ft)
- Repeater: 1490 WMPX (Midland)

Links
- Public license information: Public file; LMS
- Webcast: Listen Live
- Website: www.sunny977fm.com

WMRX-FM (97.7 FM) is an adult contemporary radio station that is licensed to Beaverton, Michigan, and serving the greater Midland and Bay City areas of Mid-Michigan. The station is owned by Black Diamond Broadcast Group, L.L.C. and broadcasts from studios at the Midland Mall.

Programming is simulcast on WMPX AM 1490 and FM Translator W299CK, licensed to Midland, Michigan at 107.7 MHz.

== WMRX history ==
Originally WGEO-FM, the station was purchased by Maines Broadcasting in December 1983 and became WMRX-FM. The station ran an automated adult contemporary format from 1983 through 1990. The music was a more contemporary version of the MOR format of sister station WMPX. In the summer of 1990, WMRX-FM became a direct simulcast of WMPX, and later in the year both stations became an affiliate of ABC Radio's "Star Station" adult contemporary format. Steel Broadcasting purchased the stations in 1992, retaining the "Star Station" format. In late 1994, the stations changed format to adult standards and were branded as "Unforgettable" airing ABC's "Stardust" format to great success. The stations stayed with ABC as the format morphed into "Timeless Favorites" in the early 2000s. In 2010, when ABC dropped the "Timeless" format, the stations became an affiliate of Dial Global's "America's Best Music" adult standards format. In January 2014, the stations dropped the satellite format and became "Sunny 97-7" airing a soft gold playlist similar to the previous standards format but with more recent and uptempo music included. By 2017, competitor WHNN had changed format to AC, and the simulcast with WMPX shifted to classic hits, while retaining the Sunny brand, with a new logo.

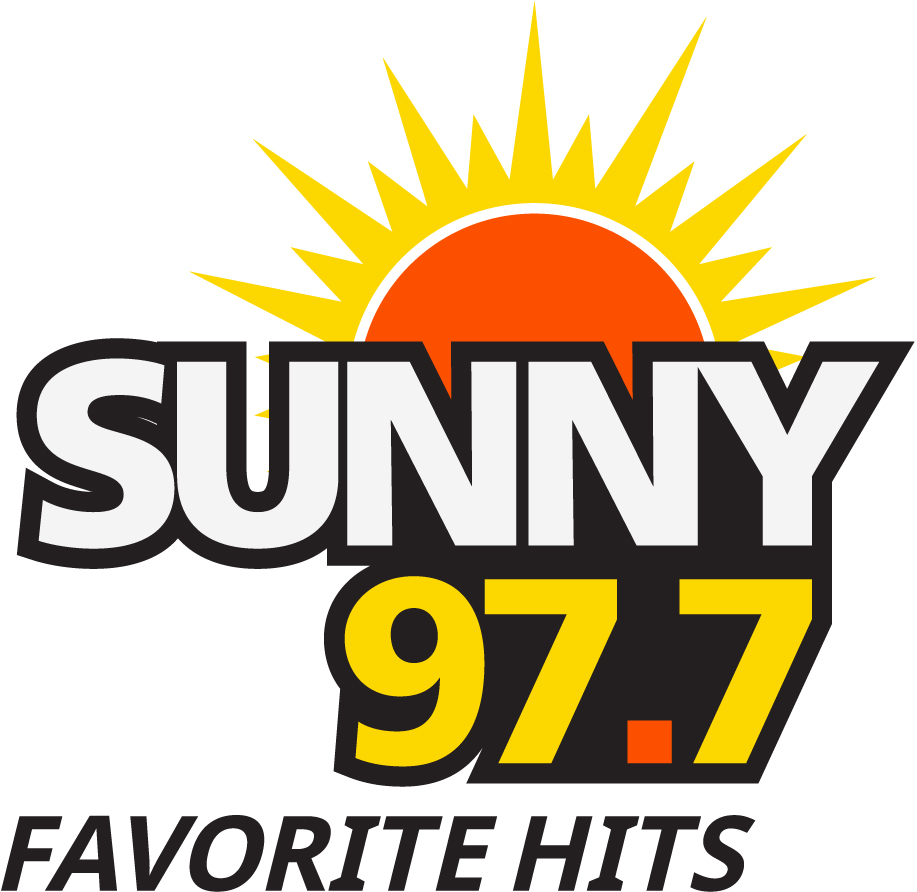
Previous logo

In 2019, WMRX-FM broke simulcast with WMPX, as WMPX added a translator on 107.7 and became Country Gold "107.7 The Highway" featuring a 1990s-based classic country format. The station was branded as "Country's Greatest Hits".

On July 1, 2023, WMRX-FM brought back the simulcast with WMPX and rebranded as "Sunny 97.7/107.7".

Effective October 17, 2023, Black Diamond Broadcasting acquired WMRX-FM, WMPX, and translator W299CK from Steel Broadcasting for $100,000. The classic hits format was retained but tweaked in a softer, more adult contemporary direction with the re-addition of artists such as Celine Dion, Kelly Clarkson and Mariah Carey. This reduces overlap with more traditionally rock-based sister station WUPS, which covers most of the WMRX/WMPX coverage area.

In January 2021, the station began branding as "Mid-Michigan's Favorite Hits" with a primarily Classic Hits format.

In May 2026, the station transitioned to an adult contemporary playing primarily soft rock hits mixed in with more recent artists. The format change eliminates overlap with sister station WUPS and places the station someplace in between gold AC station WSAG and mainstream AC station WHNN.
