= WTLZ =

Radio station in Saginaw, Michigan

- Saginaw, Michigan; United States
- Broadcast area: Saginaw, Midland, and Bay City metropolitan area
- Frequency: 107.1 MHz
- Branding: Kiss 107.1 FM

Programming
- Format: Urban adult contemporary
- Affiliations: Premiere Networks

Ownership
- Owner: Connoisseur Media; (Alpha Media Licensee LLC)
- Sister stations: WCEN-FM; WGER; WSGW; WSGW-FM

History
- First air date: October 1969
- Former call signs: WWWS (1969-1988)

Technical information
- Licensing authority: FCC
- Facility ID: 74093
- Class: A
- ERP: 5,000 watts
- HAAT: 109 meters (358 ft)
- Transmitter coordinates: 43°21′8.8″N 83°55′0.2″W

Links
- Public license information: Public file; LMS
- Webcast: Listen live
- Website: www.kisswtlz.com

WTLZ (107.1 FM, "Kiss 107.1") is a radio station licensed to Saginaw, Michigan, broadcasting an urban adult contemporary format.

WTLZ retains a strong signal south of Saginaw toward Flint, but moving eastward toward the Lapeer County area, WSAQ 107.1 "Q Country" signal tends to overpower WTLZ as they are both on the same frequency.

== History ==
The station signed on in October 1969 as WWWS "W3-Soul" with an ERP of 2,000 watts. W3 Soul at the time played a mix of jazz and R&B for the Tri-Cities. The studios were located on Bancroft at East Genesee in Saginaw.

The station is the heritage African American-oriented radio station in the market and has featured some variation of urban format for decades.

=== Power 107 ===
In September 1988 the calls were changed to WTLZ as "Power 107" adding disco, and rap throughout the 1990s, then would evolve into a rhythmic contemporary hit radio format then as mainstream urban. It was around 1989 when the owners wanted to market WTLZ towards Flint and would increase the power to 4,900 watts, with a signal that would reach from North of Mt. Pleasant to southern Genesee County. WTLZ had some of the highest ratings ever during this time when they signed local DJ Danny Drake and Tony Lamptey from New York City. Then in the 1990s with specialty shows such as the "Saturday Night Street Mix".

=== Hot 107 ===
In December 1998 WTL Broadcasting opted to sell the station to Connoisseur Communications which already had stations in Flint. In March 1999 Connoisseur tweaked WTLZ from mainstream urban to "Today's Best R&B and Jammin Oldies" "HOT 107", cutting back on (but not eliminating for several years afterward) rap and hip hop product from its playlist (though hip hop was played mostly at night). Eventually, the format evolved into the current urban AC as most hip-hop was dropped from the playlist and the nighttime hip-hop programming was replaced by "slow jams" on the "Quiet Fire" (a variation of the Quiet Storm concept).

=== New ownership ===
WTLZ was purchased by Cumulus Media who would sell their Saginaw stations to NextMedia Group in 2009. NextMedia rebranded WTLZ from Hot 107 to Kiss 107.1 in the fall of 2009, staying with its urban AC format.

Kiss 107.1 is the Tri-Cities' outlet for The Steve Harvey Morning Show. Weekend programming includes Walt "Baby" Love's nationally syndicated Urban AC countdown, gospel programs on Sunday morning, and The Flow, Your Urban Jazz Connection, on Sunday afternoons.

NextMedia sold WTLZ and their 32 other radio stations to Digity, LLC for $85 million; the transaction was consummated on February 10, 2014.

Effective February 25, 2016, Digity, LLC and its 124 radio stations were acquired by Alpha Media for $264 million. Alpha Media merged with Connoisseur Media on September 4, 2025.
