= Chesaning (YTB-769) =

Tugboat of the United States Navy

History

United States
- Awarded: 18 January 1963
- Builder: Mobile Ship Repair, Mobile, Alabama
- Laid down: 17 July 1963
- Launched: 5 February 1964
- Acquired: 16 June 1964
- Stricken: 25 May 2005

General characteristics
- Class & type: Natick-class large harbor tug
- Displacement: 283 long tons (288 t) (light); 356 long tons (362 t) (full)
- Length: 109 ft (33 m)
- Beam: 31 ft (9.4 m)
- Draft: 14 ft (4.3 m)
- Speed: 12 knots (14 mph; 22 km/h)
- Complement: 12
- Armament: None

Chesaning (YTB-769) was a United States Navy Natick-class large harbor tug named for Chesaning, Michigan.

== Construction ==
The contract for Chesaning was awarded 18 January 1963. She was laid down on 17 July 1963 at Mobile, Alabama by Mobile Ship Repair and launched 5 February 1964.

== Operational history ==
Delivered to the Navy on 16 June 1964, Chesaning was assigned to the 6th Fleet at Naval Base La Maddelena, Italy.

Stricken from the Navy Directory 25 May 2005, ex-Chesaning was sold 14 September 2006.
