= WSGW (AM) =

Radio station in Saginaw, Michigan

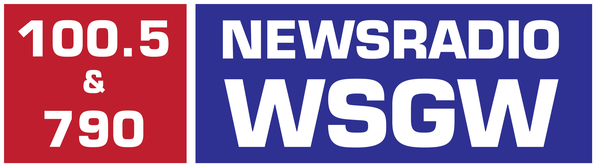
- Saginaw, Michigan; United States
- Broadcast area: Michigan Tri-Cities
- Frequency: 790 kHz
- Branding: 100.5 and 790 Newsradio WSGW

Programming
- Format: News/talk
- Network: ABC News Radio
- Affiliations: Compass Media Networks; Premiere Networks; Westwood One; Detroit Red Wings; Detroit Tigers; Michigan Wolverines; Saginaw Spirit

Ownership
- Owner: Connoisseur Media; (Alpha Media Licensee LLC)
- Sister stations: WCEN-FM; WGER; WSGW-FM; WTLZ

History
- First air date: August 11, 1950
- Call sign meaning: Saginaw

Technical information
- Licensing authority: FCC
- Facility ID: 22674
- Class: B
- Power: 5,000 watts day; 1,000 watts night
- Transmitter coordinates: 43°27′40.1″N 83°48′47.9″W

Links
- Public license information: Public file; LMS
- Webcast: Listen live
- Website: www.wsgw.com

WSGW (790 kHz) is a commercial AM radio station in Saginaw, Michigan, owned by Connoisseur Media. It simulcasts a news/talk radio format with sister station 100.5 WSGW-FM. The two stations identify themselves as "100.5 and 790 Newsradio WSGW". The studios are on Tittabawassee Road.

By day, WSGW is powered at 5,000 watts. At night, to protect other stations on 790 AM from interference, it reduces power to 1,000 watts. The station uses a directional antenna with a six-tower array. The transmitter is on Uncle Henry Road in Blumfield Township.

== Programming ==
Weekdays on WSGW begin with The Morning Team, a news, entertainment, and information show hosted by Charlie Rood, Mike Percha, and Jonathan Dent. Veteran broadcaster Art Lewis hosts his own talk show in late mornings, featuring interviews with local newsmakers and phone calls from the public. Agriculture director Terry Henne hosts The Farm Show just before noon, focusing on local weather, market conditions, and agriculture news. The rest of the day, nationally syndicated programs include Markley, Van Camp and Robbins, The Sean Hannity Show, Joe Pags, The Ramsey Show with Dave Ramsey, Coast to Coast AM with George Noory and America in the Morning with John Trout.

On weekends, WSGW air specialty shows on health, money, technology, the outdoors, farming and home repair. Weekend syndicated programs include The Kim Komando Show and Our American Stories with Lee Habeeb, as well as repeats of weekday shows. The station is the flagship station for Outdoor Magazine with Mike Avery, a Michigan-based hunting and fishing talk show, and also airs the Michigan-based travel show Behind the Mitten. Most hours begin with an update from CBS News Radio.

WSGW airs play-by-play sports coverage of the Detroit Tigers and Detroit Red Wings. University of Michigan basketball games from the Michigan Sports Network also air on AM 790, while football games air on sister station FM 100.5. Conflicting sports games that would usually air on WSGW are sometimes moved to sister station WSGW-FM. Local minor league hockey team the Saginaw Spirit and Saginaw Valley State University athletics are also heard between the two stations.

National and international news updates come from CBS News Radio and statewide news from the Michigan News Network. WSGW is also airs financial reports from Fox Business, agricultural news from Brownfield, and weather reports from Weatherology.

== History ==
WSGW first signed on the air on August 11, 1950, and was first affiliated with the Mutual Broadcasting System. The station had studios at Genesee and Washington Avenues on the third floor of the Mason Building in downtown Saginaw. The six tower directional antenna complex is near Indiantown north of M-81 east of Saginaw.

The station was started by John Lord Booth, of Detroit who founded Booth American Company. In 1973 Booth built new studios at 1795 Tittabawassee Road shared with then sister station WIOG. Then in 1988 the facility was tripled in size with a major expansion. The Booth family operated the station for 45 years until 1995 when the station was sold to another Detroit area media family called Fritz Broadcasting. During the period of deregulation just prior to the turn of the century, the station changed hands several times with brief ownerships by 62nd Street Broadcasting, Citadel Communications and Wilks Broadcasting.

NextMedia Group bought the station in 2002. Digity acquired WSGW in 2014, which was sold to Alpha Media in 2015. Alpha Media merged with Connoisseur Media on September 4, 2025.

WSGW was the home for big-name syndicated personalities Rush Limbaugh and Sean Hannity throughout the 2000s. However, in January 2009, WSGW swapped programming with its FM sister station. The swap meant WSGW no longer had to interrupt their shows for sports broadcasts while still keeping top rated The Rush Limbaugh Show and The Sean Hannity Show in the market. WSGW subsequently picked up personalities Tom Sullivan and Dennis Miller, replacing the latter with Dave Ramsey in 2015.

In June 2019, it was announced that WSGW-FM 100.5 would simulcast WSGW weekdays from 1am to Noon. It would also mark the end of longtime mid-morning talk show Listen to the Mrs. Further changes were made to the schedule in December 2020, announcing a merger of FM 100.5 and AM 790's programming, effectively making WSGW-FM a 24-hour simulcast of its sister station with the exception of sporting events. In 2022, longtime program director Dave Mauer and news director Ann Williams resigned from WSGW.

== Technical ==
WSGW's low dial position and corresponding long wavelength, along with a complex antenna array provides a strong signal to the Tri-Cities area and eastern portions of the Thumb. Adjacent channel interference from AM 800 CKLW in Windsor, Ontario limits WSGW's signal to the south and east. On most days, WSGW can be received as far west as Grand Rapids and north along the I-75 corridor to places like West Branch and Gaylord.

WSGW's technical history can be traced back to October 1945 when Booth Radio applied for a construction permit to build a radio station licensed to Saginaw. The original construction permit called for WSGW to broadcast at 550 kHz with 1,000 watts of power from a location on Curtis Road east of US-10 (Dixie Highway) in Bridgeport, Michigan. The Federal Communications Commission denied the application. An amended construction permit was granted in April 1949 for WSGW to operate on 790 kHz with 1,000 watts of power from a site on Uncle Henry Road in Indiantown in eastern Saginaw County. In 1961 a new Gates transmitter was installed, and WSGW was granted a power increase up to 5,000 watts during the day. WSGW gained FM sister station WIOG in September 1969, broadcasting at 106.3 mHz. In 1972, the main studios for WSGW were moved from the Mason building in downtown Saginaw to Tittabawassee Road in Carrollton Township, where WSGW and its sister stations continue to broadcast.
