= Tri-Cities (Michigan) =

- Combined Statistical Area
- Saginaw–Midland–Bay City, MI; Combined Statistical Area
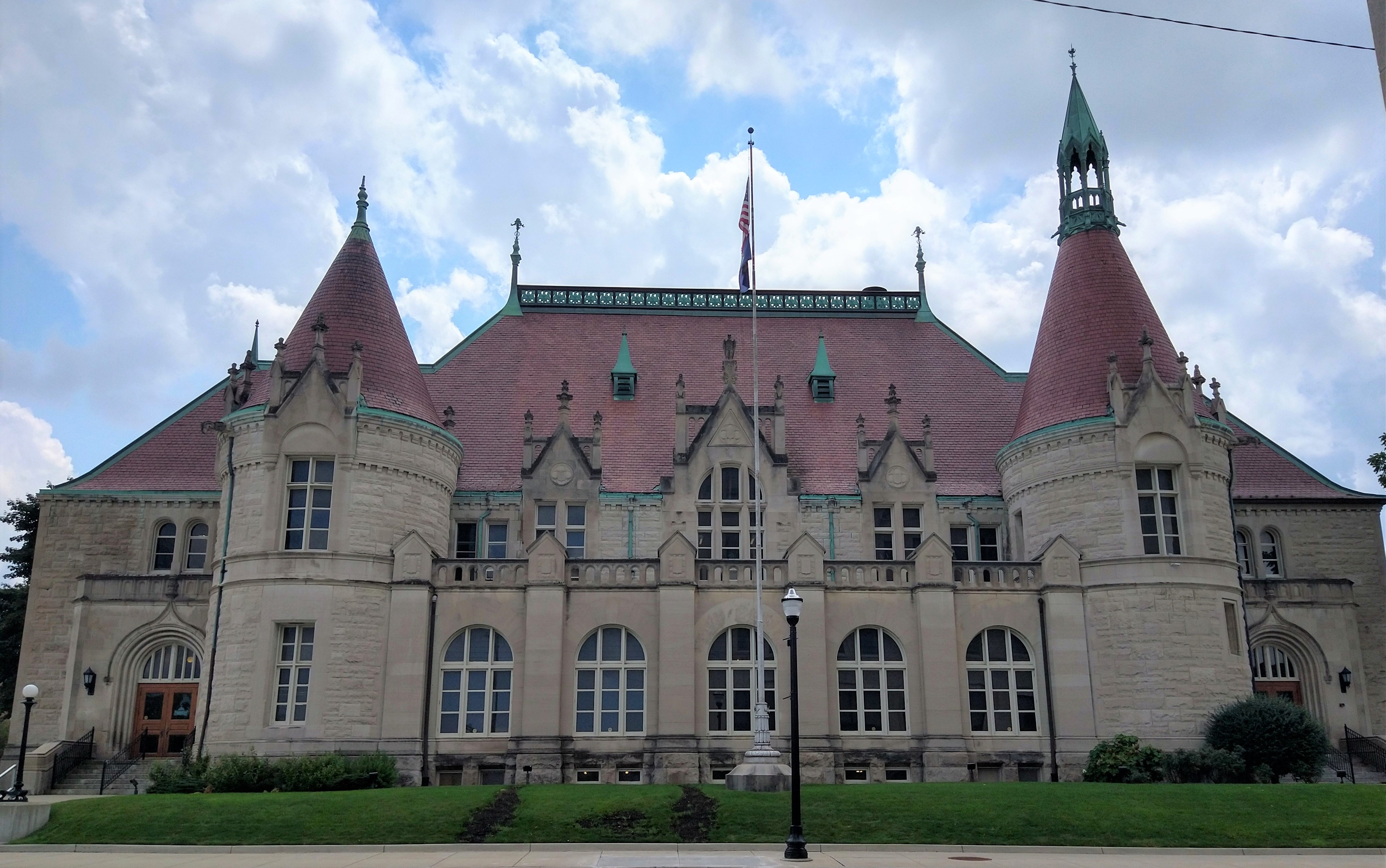
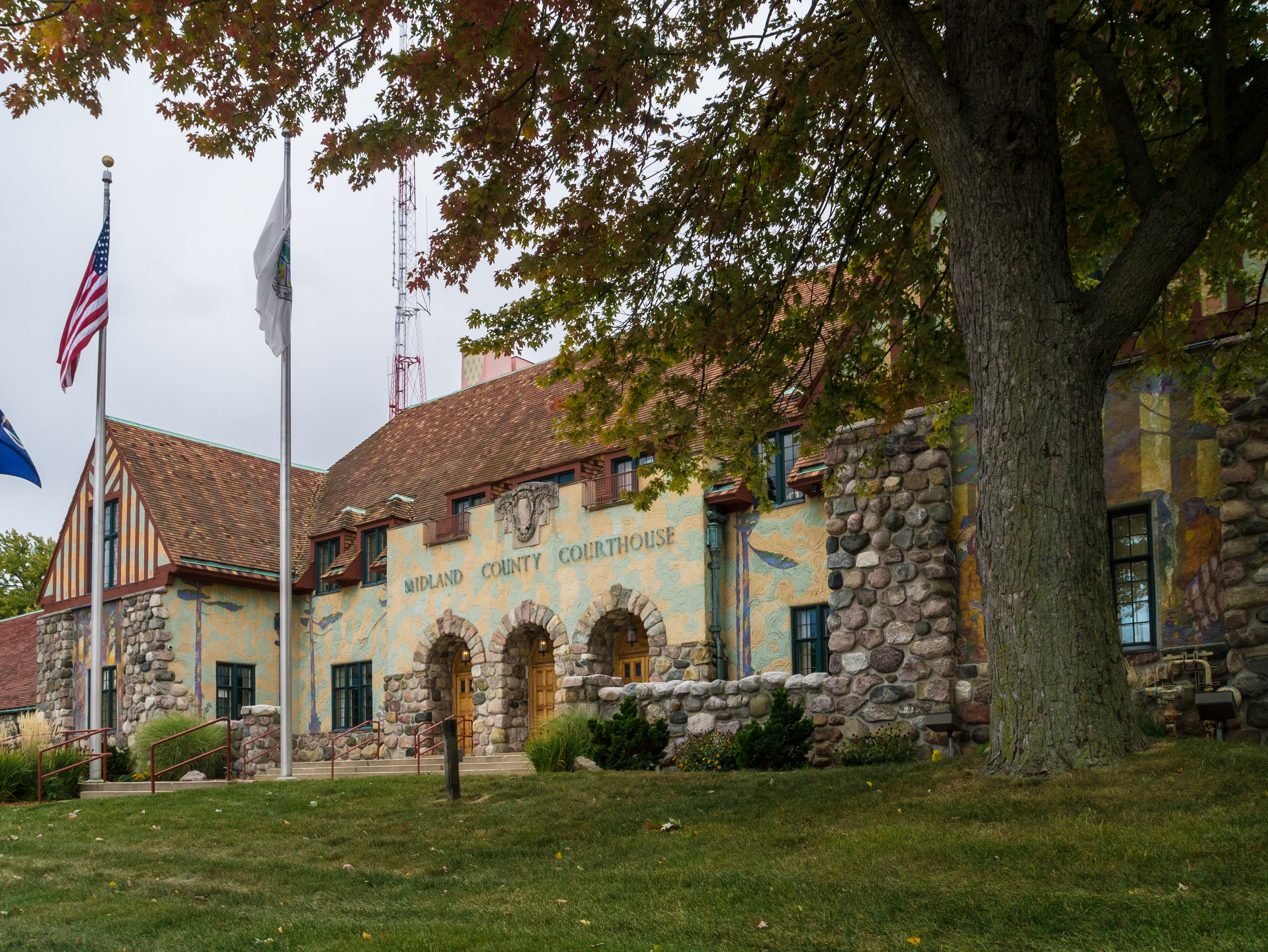
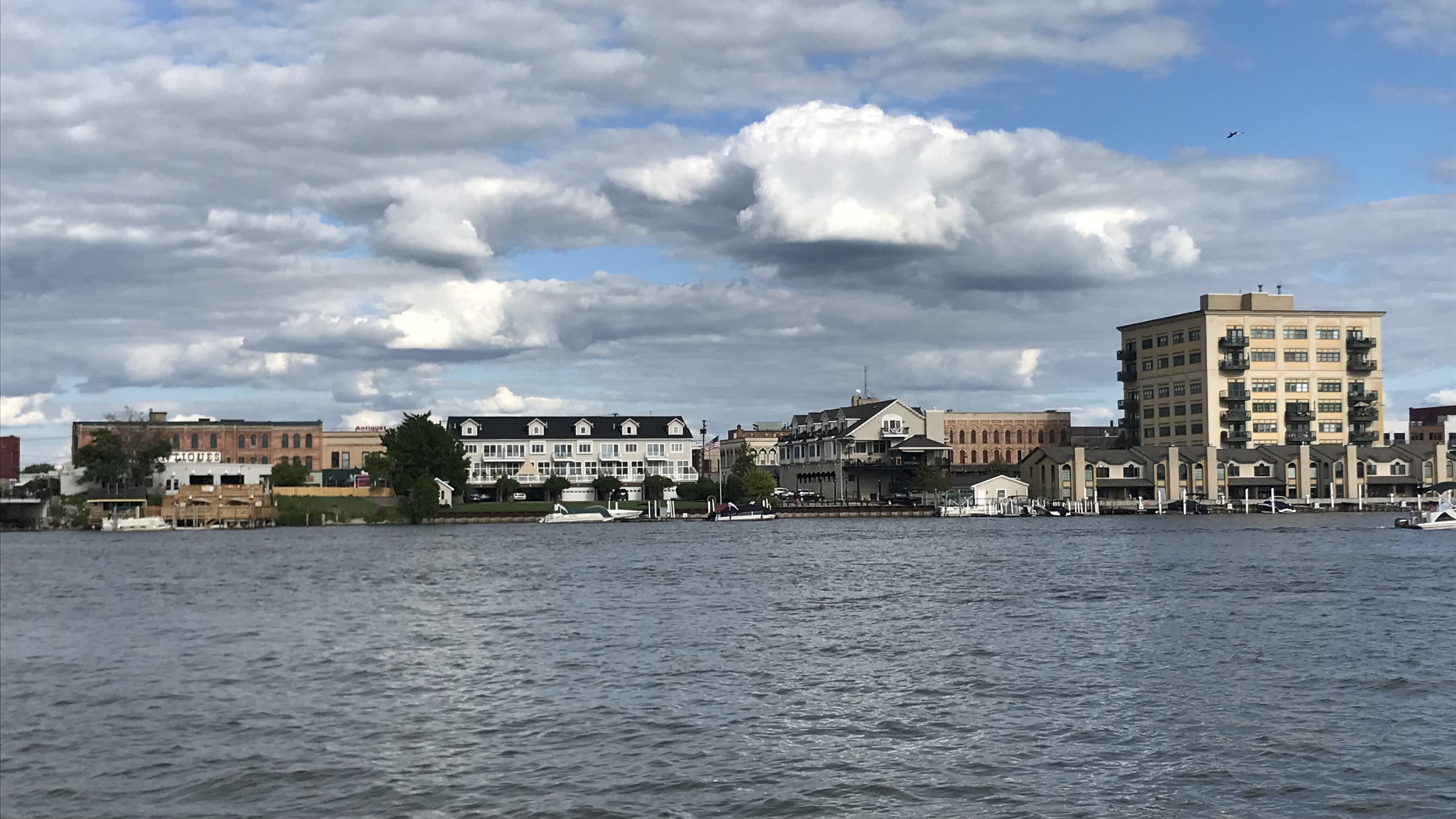
- From top to bottom: Saginaw, Midland, Bay City
- Nickname: Great Lakes Bay Region
Map of Saginaw–Midland–Bay City, MI CSA
City of Saginaw
Saginaw, MI MSA
City of Midland
Midland, MI MSA
Bay City
Bay City, MI MSA
- Coordinates: 42.1724°N 85.3524°W
- Country: United States
- State: Michigan
- Largest city: Saginaw
- Counties: Saginaw; Bay; Midland
- Principal cities: Saginaw; Midland; Bay City

Population (2015)
  - Saginaw MSA: 200,169
  - Tri-Cities CSA: 391,569
- Time zone: UTC-5 (EST)
  - Summer (DST): UTC-4 (EDT)
- Area code: 989

The Saginaw–Midland–Bay City combined statistical area, commonly known as the Tri-Cities, is a United States metropolitan area defined by the federal Office of Management and Budget (OMB) surrounding the Saginaw River and Saginaw Bay. The region is a part of the larger area known as Mid/Central Michigan. It includes the smaller statistical areas of Saginaw, Midland, and Bay City.

The Saginaw Metropolitan Statistical Area is a metropolitan area consisting of Saginaw County, anchored by the city of Saginaw and including Saginaw Township. As of the 2010 census, the Metropolitan Statistical Area (MSA) had a population of 200,169.

The Midland Micropolitan Statistical Area is a Micropolitan Statistical Area anchored by the city of Midland and surrounding Midland County. As of the 2010 census, the Micropolitan Statistical Area (μSA) had a population of 83,629.

The Bay City Metropolitan Statistical Area is a MSA anchored by the city of Bay City and surrounding Bay County. As of the 2010 census, the Metropolitan Statistical Area had a population of 107,771.

== Definitions ==
The Saginaw–Midland–Bay City Combined Statistical Area is the 4th largest CSA in the U.S. state of Michigan. As of the 2010 census, the CSA had a population of 391,569. The CSA combines what is known as the Tri-Cities of Saginaw, Midland, and Bay City. It includes Saginaw County in the Saginaw Metropolitan Statistical Area plus one the Metropolitan Statistical Area of Bay County and the micropolitan area of Midland County.

In January 2009 local community and business leaders began to refer to the Greater Tri-Cities area as the Great Lakes Bay Region with the hope that a cooperative regional focus could spur economic development in the area. The term Great Lakes Bay region refers to the counties of Bay, Midland, Isabella, and Saginaw.

== Economy ==
Due to their close proximity, the governments of Bay County and the cities of Midland and Saginaw agreed to own and share a centrally located airport through a special municipal body. The airport's name is an initialism formed from the names of the three owning communities: Midland, Bay County & Saginaw. MBS International Airport, located in Freeland, Michigan was formerly known as Tri-City Airport but was renamed to MBS International Airport in 1994 to prevent confusion with other airports named "Tri-City Airport”.

Several large corporations have operations in the Greater Tri Cities Region. The Michigan Sugar Company, which is a cooperative owned by 1,250 farmers, operates a factory and has its headquarters in Bay City. General Motors operates Powertrain plants in Flint, Bay City, and Saginaw. The Dow Chemical Company world headquarters is in Midland. Nexteer Corporation operates Saginaw Steering Systems in Saginaw. S.C. Johnson and Son has a manufacturing facility in Bay City making Ziploc products.

Local media outlets include: WNEM, CBS TV5 operates out of Saginaw and is licensed to Bay City. WEYI, NBC 25 is also licensed to Saginaw. NewsRadio 790 WSGW and FM Talk 100.5, are the area's local news, talk and sports affiliates. Other highly rated stations in the Tri-Cities include WIOG, WCEN, WHNN, and WKCQ. The Saginaw News, Bay City Times and Midland Daily News are available through the region, as well as Great Lakes Bay (Regional Lifestyle Magazine).

Tourism also makes up a large portion of the local economy. A popular spot along I-75 for "Up North" bound visitors is the outlets at Birch Run. Also, nearby Frankenmuth attracts year round visitors. Frankenmuth alone draws over three million tourists annually to its Bavarian-themed shops and restaurants. Frankenmuth also attracts tourists with festivals and other events throughout the year. The Thumb lies within the east-central tourism region of the state

== Cities and towns ==
=== Places with 25,000 to 100,000 inhabitants ===
- Saginaw
- Saginaw Township
- Midland
- Bay City

=== Places with 5,000 to 25,000 inhabitants ===
- Thomas Township
- Buena Vista Township
- Bangor Township
- Carrollton
- Bridgeport
- Freeland
- Monitor Township
- Hampton Township
- Tittabawassee Township

== Education ==
- Saginaw Valley State University – located in University Center
- Northwood University – located in Midland
- Central Michigan University – located in Mount Pleasant, however, operates several branches in the Tri-Cities
- Delta College (Michigan) – located in University Center

== See also ==
- Michigan statistical areas
