= WCEN-FM =

Radio station in Hemlock, Michigan

- Hemlock, Michigan; United States
- Broadcast area: Saginaw–Bay City–Midland–Mt. Pleasant
- Frequency: 94.5 MHz
- Branding: 94-5 The Moose

Programming
- Format: Country
- Affiliations: Westwood One

Ownership
- Owner: Connoisseur Media; (Alpha Media Licensee LLC)
- Sister stations: WGER; WSGW; WSGW-FM; WTLZ

History
- First air date: 1959
- Call sign meaning: Central Michigan

Technical information
- Licensing authority: FCC
- Facility ID: 60787
- Class: C1
- Power: 100,000 watts
- HAAT: 299 meters (981 ft)
- Transmitter coordinates: 43°43′36.1″N 84°36′16″W

Links
- Public license information: Public file; LMS
- Webcast: Listen live
- Website: www.945themoose.com

WCEN-FM (94.5 MHz, "The Moose") is a radio station broadcasting a country music format. WCEN has been licensed in Hemlock, Michigan, since 2001. It first began broadcasting in 1959 and was originally licensed in Mount Pleasant, Michigan (though the tower location and signal pattern have not changed since the city of license change, and the station still has a local-grade signal in Mount Pleasant). The station has been playing country music since 1969 and as a full-time format since 1980.

== Early history and AM frequency ==
On October 16, 1948, Paul A. Brandt, a businessman in Mount Pleasant, Michigan, applied to the Federal Communications Commission (FCC) for a broadcast station construction permit. On April 21, 1948, the FCC granted a construction permit for station WCEN and building began. On August 8, 1949, WCEN went on the air for the first time as a 500-watt, AM daytime only station on 1150 kHz. The studios were located in downtown Mount Pleasant at 112½ E. Broadway, above Voisin's Jewelry store. The transmitter was located about one mile south of the then city limits, just east of U.S. 27 on Bluegrass Road. In late 1949, Steve Cole became the chief engineer and general manager. On December 17, 1951, the FCC granted a construction permit for WCEN improvements. On February 26, 1952, the station began full-time operation on 1150 kHz with 1,000 watts, non-directional daytime, and 500 watts directional nighttime power. In late 1953, the WCEN studios were moved from downtown Mount Pleasant to the Bluegrass Road transmitter site.

In 1959, WCEN-FM went on the air at 94.5 MHz. The FM transmitter and antenna were co-located at the Bluegrass Road location. In 1969, a country format was tried for the first time on the 94.5 frequency; and later a dayparted mixture of country and rock. Afterwards, 94.5 turned into a full-time country station as "94 Country". This came with an upgrade in 1990 which moved both the AM and FM transmitters to a location near Coleman, Michigan. The new thousand-foot FM tower and erp of 100,000 watts for WCEN provided the maximum Class C1 coverage area, reaching much of Mid-Michigan including the Tri-Cities. Later the entire Tri-Cities station group was sold to Wilks Broadcasting for $6 million.

In November 2000, WCEN (1150 AM) went silent after 51 years serving the Mount Pleasant area.

== Listening area and range ==
WCEN has a relatively strong signal with the ability to reach the Mid-Michigan Thumb. During certain atmospheric conditions, it has the tendency to reach the Far northern Oakland County area, however the signal is not often strong that far south (mostly due to adjacent channel interference from WCSX on 94.7 which uses HD Radio technology). WCEN can also be heard in western Sanilac County and under the right conditions, as far east as Marlette. WCEN has a large coverage area, giving local coverage to about thirteen counties.
