= Oakley, Michigan =

- Village
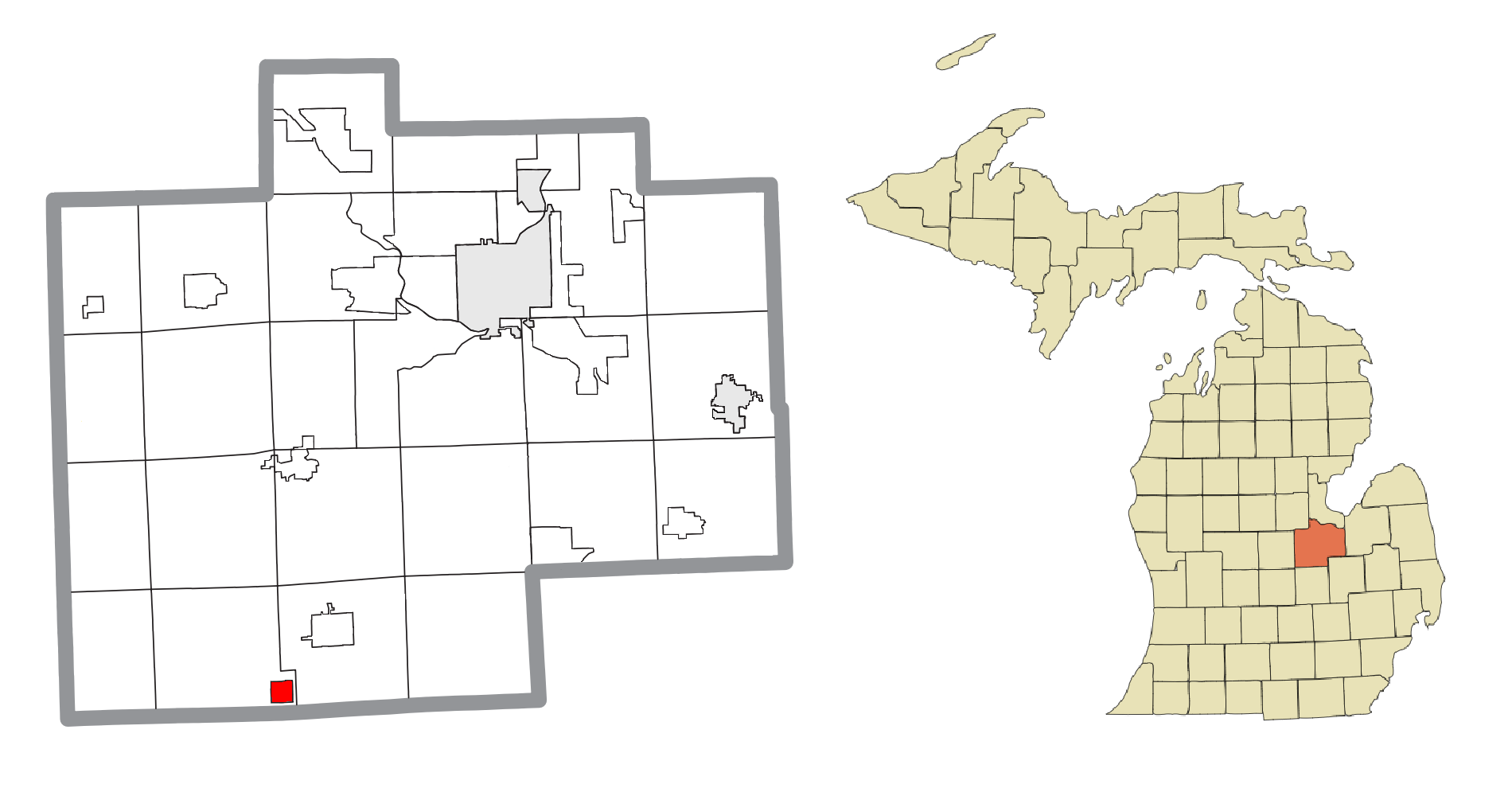
- Location within Saginaw County

- Location within the state of Michigan
- Coordinates: 43°08′36″N 84°10′07″W
- Country: United States
- State: Michigan
- County: Saginaw
- Township: Brady

Government
  - President: Richard Fish
  - Village Clerk: Jennifer Hart

Area
  - Total: 1.04 sq mi (2.70 km^{2})
  - Land: 1.03 sq mi (2.67 km^{2})
  - Water: 0.0077 sq mi (0.02 km^{2})
- Elevation: 679 ft (207 m)

Population (2020)
  - Total: 299
  - Density: 289.7/sq mi (111.84/km^{2})
- Time zone: UTC-5 (Eastern (EST))
  - Summer (DST): UTC-4 (EDT)
- ZIP code(s): 48649
- Area code: 989
- FIPS code: 26-59860
- GNIS feature ID: 2399543
- Website: https://villageofoakley.com/

Oakley is a village in Saginaw County in the U.S. state of Michigan. As of the 2020 census, Oakley had a population of 299. The village is within Brady Township, although about half of the village would lie within Chesaning Township on the east, if the boundary line had not been adjusted.

== History ==
Originally the area was called Mickleville. Philip Mickle, who owned a tavern there in 1842, became the first postmaster of Mickleville on March 12, 1856. That post office was moved to the hamlet of Havana on April 18, 1860, which was two miles southeast of Oakleys present location. In 1868, Andrew Huggins plotted and recorded the village of Oakley and the post office was moved from Havana. It was named for Judge Oakley of Dutchess County, New York, a relative of one of its citizens. Oakley was incorporated as a village in 1887.

In 1880 Oakley had a population of 350, one school, three dry-goods stores, two grocers, two drug stores and two hardware stores. It had a factory that employed 40 people.

== Geography ==
According to the United States Census Bureau, the village has a total area of 1.03 square miles (2.67 km^{2}), of which, 1.02 square miles (2.64 km^{2}) of it is land and 0.01 square miles (0.03 km^{2}) is water.

== Demographics ==
Historical population
Census	Pop.	Note	%±
1880	298		—
1890	299		0.3%
1900	231		−22.7%
1910	237		2.6%
1920	201		−15.2%
1930	218		8.5%
1940	270		23.9%
1950	333		23.3%
1960	417		25.2%
1970	418		0.2%
1980	412		−1.4%
1990	362		−12.1%
2000	339		−6.4%
2010	290		−14.5%
2020	299		3.1%
U.S. Decennial Census

=== 2010 census ===
As of the census of 2010, there were 290 people, 116 households, and 76 families residing in the village. The population density was 284.3 inhabitants per square mile (109.8/km^{2}). There were 135 housing units at an average density of 132.4 per square mile (51.1/km^{2}). The racial makeup of the village was 95.2% White, 3.8% African American, 0.7% Native American, and 0.3% from two or more races. Hispanic or Latino of any race were 3.8% of the population.

There were 116 households, of which 24.1% had children under the age of 18 living with them, 45.7% were married couples living together, 13.8% had a female householder with no husband present, 6.0% had a male householder with no wife present, and 34.5% were non-families. 28.4% of all households were made up of individuals, and 18.1% had someone living alone who was 65 years of age or older. The average household size was 2.50 and the average family size was 3.07.

The median age in the village was 42.7 years. 22.1% of residents were under the age of 18; 8.2% were between the ages of 18 and 24; 23.1% were from 25 to 44; 28.5% were from 45 to 64; and 17.9% were 65 years of age or older. The gender makeup of the village was 47.2% male and 52.8% female.

=== 2000 census ===
As of the census of 2000, there were 339 people, 136 households, and 85 families residing in the village. The population density was 332.5 inhabitants per square mile (128.4/km^{2}). There were 146 housing units at an average density of 143.2 per square mile (55.3/km^{2}). The racial makeup of the village was 97.35% White, 0.29% Native American, 0.29% Pacific Islander, 0.59% from other races, and 1.47% from two or more races. Hispanic or Latino of any race were 5.01% of the population.

There were 136 households, out of which 31.6% had children under the age of 18 living with them, 51.5% were married couples living together, 8.1% had a female householder with no husband present, and 36.8% were non-families. 27.9% of all households were made up of individuals, and 13.2% had someone living alone who was 65 years of age or older. The average household size was 2.49 and the average family size was 3.13.

In the village, the population was spread out, with 26.0% under the age of 18, 10.6% from 18 to 24, 30.4% from 25 to 44, 18.9% from 45 to 64, and 14.2% who were 65 years of age or older. The median age was 35 years. For every 100 females, there were 96.0 males. For every 100 females age 18 and over, there were 93.1 males.

The median income for a household in the village was $32,159, and the median income for a family was $36,458. Males had a median income of $25,938 versus $22,500 for females. The per capita income for the village was $17,403. About 7.1% of families and 9.5% of the population were below the poverty line, including 13.7% of those under age 18 and 9.3% of those age 65 or over.

== Police department ==
Starting in 2009, the police department began to award donors with credentials as reserve policemen. By 2014, the department had about 100 reserve officers to protect a township with a population about 300. The reserve policemen had badges and identifications that exempted them from pistol-free zones while carrying concealed. Some seem to have also retained bulletproof vests and other equipment bought by the village with their donations.

The village disbanded its police department in September 2014 after the Michigan Township Participating Plan cancelled liability insurance for the department over concerns of its use of untrained police officers.

In October, a village official secured insurance from other sources and briefly tried to reestablish the department. This attempt was ended by a court ruling. The village has resisted requests for the names of donors to the police fund and the names of those who served as reserve officers. Issues related to the police department became important politically in the run-up to the November 2014 elections. In late November, the new town council voted to reinstate the police department.

In February 2015, press reports indicated the village had relented and made available lists of at least some of the reserve officers and donors to the village. News reports said the list were incorrect and incomplete.
