= Chesaning Township, Michigan =

- Civil township
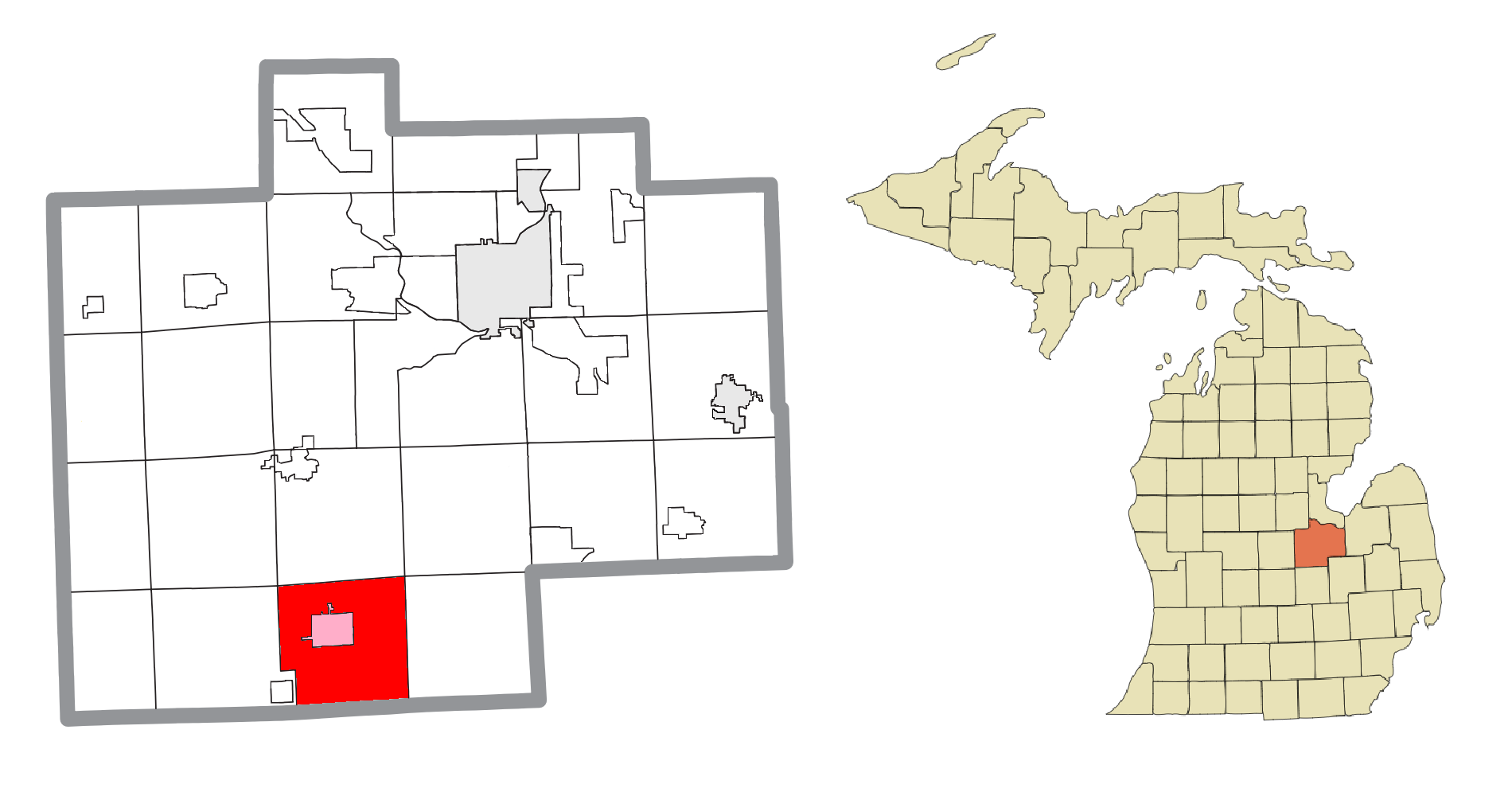
- Location within Saginaw County (red) and the administered village of Chesaning (pink)

- Location within the state of Michigan Chesaning Township (the United States)
- Coordinates: 43°10′54″N 84°06′47″W
- Country: United States
- State: Michigan
- County: Saginaw
- Established: 1847

Government
  - Supervisor: Robert Corrin
  - Clerk: Frances Kukulis

Area
  - Total: 34.7 sq mi (89.8 km^{2})
  - Land: 34.7 sq mi (89.8 km^{2})
  - Water: 0 sq mi (0.0 km^{2})
- Elevation: 636 ft (194 m)

Population (2020)
  - Total: 4,748
  - Density: 137/sq mi (52.9/km^{2})
- Time zone: UTC-5 (Eastern (EST))
  - Summer (DST): UTC-4 (EDT)
- ZIP code(s): 48616 (Chesaning); 48649 (Oakley)
- Area code: 989
- FIPS code: 26-15160
- GNIS feature ID: 1626069
- Website: Official website

Chesaning Township is a civil township of Saginaw County in the U.S. state of Michigan. The population was 4,748 at the 2020 Census. The township was organized in 1847.

== Communities ==
- The village of Chesaning is located within the township.
- Parshallburg is an unincorporated community within the township at Ditch and Niver Roads.

== Geography ==
According to the United States Census Bureau, the township has a total area of 34.7 square miles (90 km^{2}), all land.

== Demographics ==
As of the census of 2000, there were 4,861 people, 1,905 households, and 1,377 families residing in the township. The population density was 140.1 inhabitants per square mile (54.1/km^{2}). There were 1,992 housing units at an average density of 57.4 per square mile (22.2/km^{2}). The racial makeup of the township was 97.33% White, 0.25% African American, 0.25% Native American, 0.08% Asian, 0.02% Pacific Islander, 1.32% from other races, and 0.76% from two or more races. Hispanic or Latino of any race were 4.24% of the population.

There were 1,905 households, out of which 32.3% had children under the age of 18 living with them, 59.4% were married couples living together, 9.8% had a female householder with no husband present, and 27.7% were non-families. 24.5% of all households were made up of individuals, and 11.5% had someone living alone who was 65 years of age or older. The average household size was 2.52 and the average family size was 2.99.

In the township the population was spread out, with 24.5% under the age of 18, 7.9% from 18 to 24, 27.3% from 25 to 44, 24.7% from 45 to 64, and 15.5% who were 65 years of age or older. The median age was 39 years. For every 100 females, there were 95.0 males. For every 100 females age 18 and over, there were 92.6 males.

The median income for a household in the township was $40,254, and the median income for a family was $50,233. Males had a median income of $38,854 versus $24,309 for females. The per capita income for the township was $19,839. About 4.6% of families and 6.2% of the population were below the poverty line, including 4.2% of those under age 18 and 7.8% of those age 65 or over.
