= WKQZ =

Radio station in Midland, Michigan

- Midland, Michigan; United States
- Broadcast area: Saginaw-Bay City-Midland
- Frequency: 93.3 MHz
- Branding: The Rock Station Z93

Programming
- Format: Active rock
- Affiliations: Compass Media Networks; United Stations Radio Networks; Detroit Lions Radio Network

Ownership
- Owner: Cumulus Media; (Radio License Holding CBC, LLC)
- Sister stations: WHNN, WILZ, WIOG

History
- First air date: December 14, 1976
- Former call signs: WRCI (1976–1986)
- Former frequencies: 93.5 MHz (1976–1986)

Technical information
- Licensing authority: FCC
- Facility ID: 72924
- Class: C2
- ERP: 39,000 watts
- HAAT: 169 meters
- Transmitter coordinates: 43°50′46″N 84°05′32″W

Links
- Public license information: Public file; LMS
- Webcast: Listen live
- Website: therockstationz93.com

WKQZ (93.3 FM Z93) is an active rock radio station serving east-central Michigan, owned by Cumulus Media. The station is licensed to Midland, Michigan, although its studios are in Saginaw. WKQZ is the Tri-Cities affiliate for the Detroit Lions.

== Programming ==
Z93 plays mostly active rock tracks, but also frequents in some classic rock.

Since November 2016, Z93 mornings have been known as "The Morning After with Matt and Adam", hosted by longtime morning show host Adam Shilling and program director Matt Bingham, who returned to the station after he was downsized in 2011. The show replaced "Joe and the Poorboy" as long time morning show mainstay Joe Volk was terminated in August 2016 after being with the station for over 30 years. Middays [10am - 3pm) are hosted by Breck and afternoons (3pm - 7pm) are voice tracked by 97.9X Wilkes Barre, PA program director Mike “Duffy”.

== History ==
What is now Z93 was originally WRCI "Easy 93.5", an adult contemporary music station at 93.5 FM in Midland. The station began on December 14, 1976, as the city's third station and an affiliate of the Mutual Radio Network. WRCI was locally programmed at first, but in 1982, affiliated with the "Star Station" adult contemporary format delivered via satellite by Satellite Music Network. The station then tried a country format, known as "Kickin' Country 93.5 WRCI", for a very short period of time.

In January 1986, WRCI was sold to Josi Broadcasting and went off the air briefly. The station returned to the air on February 7, 1986, changed its calls to WKQZ and returned to the air as "Z93-5 The Rock Station." Brian Maloney was the program director who launched the station and held morning drive. Detroit radio consultant Paul Christy was influential in starting the station. Under its new rock format, "Z93-5" got off to a fast start and was well received by rock radio listeners in the Tri-Cities. In 1990, the station was sold to Winward Communications for $2 million. The station became presenting sponsor for many shows at the Saginaw Civic Center including Alice Cooper with Slaughter, Triumph, Ted Nugent and more. The station soon afterward shifted from 93.5 to 93.3, enabling a boost in power from 3,000 to 39,000 watts.
