= WMPX (AM) =

Simulcasting WMRX-FM Beaverton
- Midland, Michigan; United States
- Broadcast area: Saginaw-Bay City-Midland
- Frequency: 1490 kHz
- Branding: Sunny 97.7/107.7

Programming
- Format: Adult Contemporary

Ownership
- Owner: Michael Shires and Normal McKee; (Black Diamond Broadcast Group, LLC)
- Sister stations: WMRX-FM

History
- First air date: 1948 (as WMDN)
- Former call signs: WMDN (1948–1971)
- Call sign meaning: Myron P. Patten (former owner)

Technical information
- Licensing authority: FCC
- Facility ID: 39673
- Class: C
- Power: 980 watts
- Transmitter coordinates: 43°36′53″N 84°13′15″W
- Translator: 107.7 W299CK (Midland)

Links
- Public license information: Public file; LMS
- Webcast: Listen Live
- Website: sunny977fm.com

WMPX (1490 kHz) is an AM radio station licensed to Midland, Michigan broadcasting an adult contemporary format, simulcasting WMRX-FM 97.7 Beaverton. The station is imaged as "Sunny 97.7/107.7", with 107.7 being the frequency of translator W299CK Midland. Until January 2014, the station featured the America's Best Music format distributed by Westwood One.

Until March 1, 2019, WMPX was simulcast with WMRX-FM 97.7 24/7 except for some local sports play-by-play. Although there are other radio stations licensed to Midland, WMPX is today the only commercial radio station that primarily serves the Midland area (WUGN is a non-commercial religious station and WKQZ is licensed to Midland but has studios in Saginaw).

== History ==
WMPX began broadcasting in 1948 as WMDN. WMDN was Midland's first radio station, owned by the city's newspaper, the Midland Daily News. That station continued to use that call sign until July 1971.

The station was sold in 1959 to a group of Bay City businessmen.

The station was then sold in 1968 to Patten Broadcasting Co. and changed the call sign in 1971 to WMPX after firm president Myron P. Patten.

WMPX general manager Ronald Maines bought the station from Patten Communications Corp in 1981.

WMPX in Midland, along with WMRX-FM in Beaverton, changed hands again in late 1992 with Steel Broadcasting as the new owners. Steel Broadcasting was headed up by Tom Steel (55 percent) and previous WMPX shareholder Pat Patten (45 percent). Steel, Assistant General Manager at the station at the time of the sale, was originally hired as a sales rep at WMPX in 1977.

On March 1, 2019, WMPX split from its simulcast with WMRX-FM and launched a classic country format, branded as "107.7 The Highway" (simulcast on FM translator W299CK 107.7 FM Midland).

Black Diamond Broadcasting began operating WMPX under a local marketing agreement in October 2020.

In April 2023, Black Diamond Broadcasting exercised an option to purchase WMPX, WMRX-FM, and translator W299CK from Steel Broadcasting. On July 7, 2023, WMPX dropped its classic country format and switched back to a simulcast of WMRX-FM's classic hits format, branded as "Sunny 97.7/107.7". The acquisition by Black Diamond Broadcasting was consummated on October 17, 2023, at a price of $100,000.

== Previous logo ==
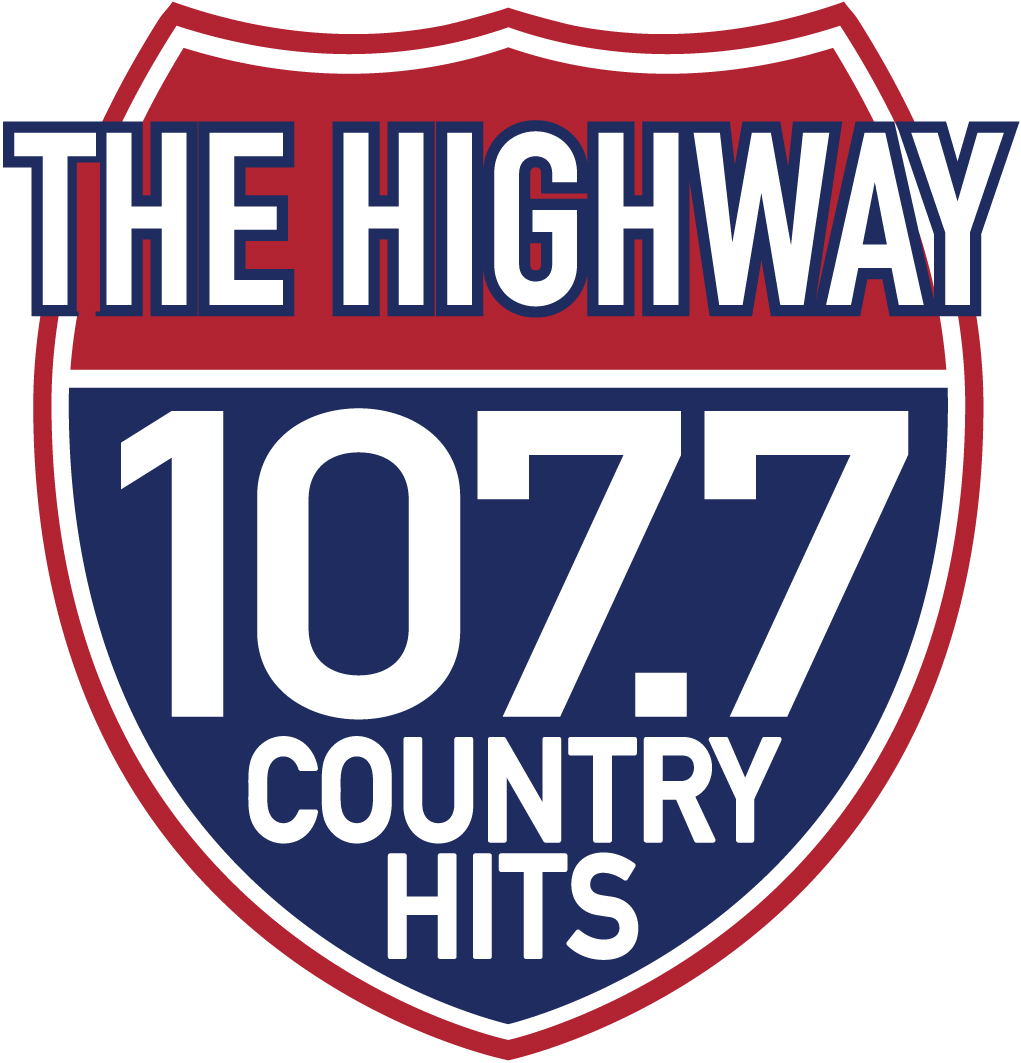
