= WHNN =

- Bay City, Michigan; United States
- Broadcast area: Saginaw-Bay City-Midland-Flint
- Frequency: 96.1 MHz
- Branding: 96.1 WHNN

Programming
- Format: Adult contemporary
- Affiliations: Premiere Networks; Westwood One

Ownership
- Owner: Cumulus Media; (Radio License Holding CBC, LLC)
- Sister stations: WILZ, WIOG, WKQZ

History
- First air date: November 1, 1947
- Former call signs: WBCM-FM (1947–1973)

Technical information
- Licensing authority: FCC
- Facility ID: 37458
- Class: C0
- ERP: 100,000 watts
- HAAT: 311 meters
- Transmitter coordinates: 43°33′10″N 83°41′24″W

Links
- Public license information: Public file; LMS
- Webcast: Listen live
- Website: whnn.com

WHNN (96.1 FM, "96.1 WHNN") is a radio station serving the Saginaw, Bay City, Midland and Flint, Michigan areas, owned by Cumulus Media with an adult contemporary format. Its studios are located on Champagne Drive South in Saginaw, and its transmitter is located on Dutcher Road near Van Buren Road in the northwest corner of Tuscola County. WUCX-FM (90.1 MHz), a Central Michigan University (CMU) owned and Delta College/CMU jointly operated NPR member station, also occupies the same tower as WHNN.

== History ==
=== Super Win and Sunny 96 ===
WBCM-FM was one of Michigan's pioneer FM stations, initially signing on November 1, 1947. In the late 1960s and early 1970s, 96.1 FM broadcast a beautiful music format. On August 27, 1973 the calls were changed to WHNN and the station adopted a Top 40 format as "Super Win." The first program director was Bruce Buchanan (Big Jim Edwards air name) and the first song played was American Band. Many listeners remember that for several years, WHNN boasted "a winner an hour, sometimes even more". At least once an hour they would award a prize to a designated caller, and announce the current tally of prizes awarded by giving the winners name, hometown and announcing that he or she was "super-Win winner number 12,384 or whatever number the current count was. Many of the prizes were fast food meals or car washes, but occasionally better prizes such as concert tickets or meals at high end restaurants were awarded. When the hourly prizes were phased out in 1979, WHNN announced it was in "the interest of public safety" as they didn't want to overwhelm the phone company's resources.

WHNN evolved into an AOR station in 1976. In 1981, despite being the top rated station in the area at the time, the station changed format from AOR to adult contemporary, with the first song being Gino Vannelli's "Living Inside Myself". Station owners stated at the time that this was because they could not sell enough ad time. As a popular AC station during the 1980s, the station was known as "Sunny 96, Lite Rock, Less Talk."

=== Oldies 96 ===
WHNN switched to an oldies format in the fall of 1990 following a period of stunting with various versions of Richard Berry's song "Louie, Louie" including the hit version by The Kingsmen. As time went on, WHNN, like many stations of its kind, evolved from "traditional" oldies to a "classic hits" direction focusing on pop, rock and soul hits from roughly 1965-1990 in the hope of reaching younger demographics, and dropped most if not all pre-1965 music from its playlist. Unlike other classic hits stations which are essentially hit-based versions of Classic rock, WHNN became a Top 40 Classic Hits station. Through the changes to the music, the station's ratings remained high.

WHNN garnered attention in the fall of 2006 when it switched to a format of all Christmas music, in response to crosstown AC competitor 106.3 WGER's announcement that they would not go all-Christmas that year. The switch also brought all-Christmas music radio to Flint, owing to continued dominance of the market's AC station, 107.9 WCRZ. WHNN switched to all-Christmas again in early November 2007; WHNN had originally planned to switch to all-Christmas on Thanksgiving Day but moved up the change when WGER opted to return to playing continuous Christmas music ahead of schedule. WGER has since switched to a Hot AC direction as "Mix 106.3" and no longer goes all-Christmas for the holiday season, but MacDonald Broadcasting's AC combo of WSAM 1400 AM and WSAG 104.1 FM ("The Bay") has taken up the Christmas music mantle in recent years to challenge WHNN. WHNN, however, continued to be Flint's only Christmas music station until November 2018, when WCRZ switched to all-Christmas music for the first time.

Cumulus Media acquired Citadel Broadcasting and WHNN in 2011. WHNN's Flint area sales offices are expected to relocate to 6317 Taylor Drive in Flint as a result; the sale also included WHNN's current studios on Champagne Drive in Saginaw.

In addition to its Tri-Cities sister stations, WHNN's other sister stations in its listening area are 92.7 WDZZ, 95.1 WFBE, 1330 WTRX, 1570 WWCK and 105.5 WWCK-FM, all licensed to Flint.

=== Today ===
On January 15, 2016, shortly before 5 pm (EST), WHNN flipped to adult contemporary as "My 96-1". The last song on 96 WHNN was "Changes" by David Bowie, while the first song on My 96-1 was "It's My Life" by Bon Jovi. While morning hosts Johnny Burke and Blondie were fired with the change, the rest of the airstaff is expected to stay. Johnny and Blondie later established their own morning show via Periscope and their website. This led to both Johnny And Blondie filing lawsuits against WHNN for age discrimination, while WHNN sued for stealing advertisement from local businesses as well as potentially using former morning show content. The station launched "My 96-1" by running commercial-free throughout that weekend. On January 18, at 5:30 a.m., when the former Johnny Burke and the Morning Crew was supposed to be on the air, the song "Good Riddance (Time Of Your Life)" by Green Day was aired, rather fitting considering the nature of the show's departure. In the last few months Johnny and Blondie worked at WHNN, and according to some of the information of the lawsuit, Johnny and Blondie indicated ideas of bringing a younger music format to WHNN which were ignored by airstaff and station management. They later realized that the actions of the station management and air staff meant that they were being set up.

The format change resulted in no Classic Hits formatted radio stations available over the air in either the Tri-Cities or Flint radio markets. Adult Hits station WMJO and gold-based AC combo WMPX/WMRX-FM are the only remaining stations in the immediate Saginaw-Bay City-Midland market playing hits from the 1960s through 1980s. In the Flint market, classic rock WRSR of Owosso continues to play some of the music formerly heard on WHNN. In March 2017, former WHNN morning show host Johnny Burke and news director Hal Maas began hosting the morning show at WRSR.

== Sources ==
- Michiguide.com - WHNN History
