= WIOG =

- Bay City, Michigan; United States
- Broadcast area: Bay City–Saginaw–Midland–Flint
- Frequency: 102.5 MHz
- Branding: 102.5 WIOG

Programming
- Format: Contemporary hit radio
- Affiliations: Westwood One

Ownership
- Owner: Cumulus Media; (Radio License Holding CBC, LLC)
- Sister stations: WHNN, WILZ, WKQZ

History
- First air date: November 12, 1961 (at 102.5 MHz); February 18, 1969 (intellectual property, at 106.3 MHz)
- Former call signs: WSBM (1969–1975 at 106.3); WNEM-FM (1961–1969 at 102.5); WGER (1969–1986 at 102.5)
- Former frequencies: 106.3 MHz (1969–1986)
- Call sign meaning: 106 (original dial position)

Technical information
- Licensing authority: FCC
- Facility ID: 22675
- Class: B
- Power: 86,000 watts
- HAAT: 244 meters (801 ft)
- Transmitter coordinates: 43°28′24″N 83°50′40″W

Links
- Public license information: Public file; LMS
- Webcast: Listen live
- Website: wiog.com

WIOG (102.5 FM) is a commercial FM radio station airing a top 40 (CHR) format. It is licensed to Bay City, Michigan, and serves the Greater Tri-Cities area, including Saginaw and Midland as well as Flint. It is owned by Cumulus Media with studios on Champagne Drive South in Saginaw.

WIOG is a Class B station. But it is grandfathered at a higher power than would be permitted today. It has an effective radiated power (ERP) of 86,000 watts. (50,000 watts is the current maximum for Class B stations.) The transmitter tower is on Becker Road in Buena Vista Charter Township. It's signal currently reaches as far west as Montcalm County, Michigan, as far east as Lake Huron, as far North as West Branch, Michigan and as far south as Oakland County, Michigan

== History ==
=== WIOG and WGER ===
WIOG began broadcasting on February 18, 1969, as WSBM, 106.3 MHz, originally licensed to Saginaw. The radio station was owned by Booth American On October 1, 1975, the call sign became WIOG (those call letters resembled the number "106," its dial position). The format shifted to album oriented rock (AOR). In 1980, with the addition of some disco and pop records to its AOR playlist, WIOG moved to a Top 40 format. It eventually took on the name "Hits 106" and became one of the most popular radio stations in the market.

The 102.5 frequency was originally home to WNEM-FM (later WGER), which was one of the pioneers of FM stereo broadcasting in Michigan. With its big signal, WGER was one of the most successful beautiful music stations in Michigan. It played quarter-hour sweeps of mostly soft instrumental music, cover versions of popular adult hits, Broadway and Hollywood show tunes. As late as 1985, when it was using TM Programming's beautiful music package, the station was posting #1 ratings among adult 25-54 listeners in the Saginaw and Flint markets, according to TM promotional literature of the time.

=== Top 40 ===
After the owner of WIOG bought WGER, then sold the old station at 106.3, WIOG and WGER switched call signs in September 1986. WGER moved its easy listening music to the lower powered 106.3 and WIOG's Top 40-CHR format was placed on 102.5. The move paid off, as WIOG quickly became a powerhouse in mid-Michigan broadcasting. In the fall of 1986, during an economic rescission, the radio station ran a new promotion known as "Free Money". It was a chance to win $1,000 to $10,000 every hour. This helped the station meet an Arbitron rating of 30.3%.

WIOG got strong competition in the early 1990s from 100.5 WTCF "The Fox", which soon surpassed WIOG as the dominant CHR station. Due to the competition and to a desire to appeal to more adult listeners, WIOG shifted to a Hot Adult Contemporary sound in May 1992. WTCF's departure from the CHR format in 1999, however, left the door open for WIOG to move back to CHR, which it did that July.

Today WIOG remains one of the most popular stations in the Tri-Cities market. However, its showing in the Flint market is more modest due to competition from CHR WWCK-FM, rhythmic WRCL and active rocker WWBN.

Notable DJs at WIOG at the time include Dean Myers, Scott "Shannon" Seipel (not to be confused with Scott Shannon), Renee Andrews, Bob Hughes, Jim Alexander, Rick Donahue, Keith Michaels, Steve Kelly, Wack and Tim Murphy. Rick Belcher was the Program Director at the time of WIOG's rating's domination.
