= WILZ =

Radio station in Michigan, United States

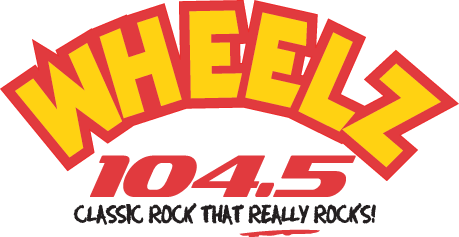
- Saginaw, Michigan; United States
- Broadcast area: Saginaw-Bay City-Midland
- Frequency: 104.5 MHz
- Branding: Wheelz 104.5

Programming
- Format: Classic rock
- Affiliations: United Stations Radio Networks; Westwood One; Michigan State Spartans football and men's basketball

Ownership
- Owner: Cumulus Media; (Radio License Holding CBC, LLC)
- Sister stations: WHNN, WIOG, WKQZ, WFBE, WTRX

History
- First air date: 1992 (as WUVE)
- Former call signs: WMJA (4/8/95-3/19/99); WUVE (5/3/91-4/8/95)
- Call sign meaning: WheeLZ

Technical information
- Licensing authority: FCC
- Facility ID: 58578
- Class: A
- Power: 2,900 watts
- HAAT: 126 meters
- Transmitter coordinates: 43°23′34″N 83°55′27″W

Links
- Public license information: Public file; LMS
- Webcast: Listen Live
- Website: wheelz.fm

WILZ (104.5 FM, "Wheelz 104.5") is a radio station broadcasting a classic rock format in Saginaw, Michigan, owned by Cumulus Media. The station is the local affiliate of morning comedy program The Bob and Tom Show, music show Nights with Alice Cooper and Michigan State Spartans football and men's basketball games.

== History ==
104.5 FM began in the early 1990s as WUVE, an album oriented rock station that aired some programming from ABC/Satellite Music Network's "Z Rock" network (though not an official "Z-Rock" affiliate). The station became WMJA ("Magic") with a classic hits format in 1995, and then adopted its current calls and format in 1999 (possibly in tribute to former Detroit album-rock station WLLZ 98.7 FM, now alternative rock station WDZH).

Wheelz 104.5 and 101 logo, back when the two stations simulcasted

WILZ's format was formerly simulcast on then-sister station WYLZ (100.9 FM) (now WLUN), licensed to Pinconning, Michigan. WYLZ has broadcast a variety of different formats since signing on in 1983. 104.5 and 100.9 together were known as "Wheelz 104.5 and 101" from 1999 to 2007.

In June 2007, WYLZ was sold by Citadel Broadcasting (along with nine other stations) to The Last Bastion Station Trust, LLC, as part of ABC Radio's absorption into Citadel. Upon ending the simulcast, WYLZ switched to a satellite-fed country format ("Mainstream Country" from Dial Global) under the "Thunder Country" moniker. Despite the programming changes, WYLZ continued to air play-by-play of Great Lakes Loons baseball during the summer of 2007. In the winter of 2008, the Great Lakes Loons finally took over ownership and changed the station to sports radio under new calls WLUN. Citadel retained WILZ until its merger with Cumulus Media on September 16, 2011.
