= Carrollton Township, Michigan =

- Civil township
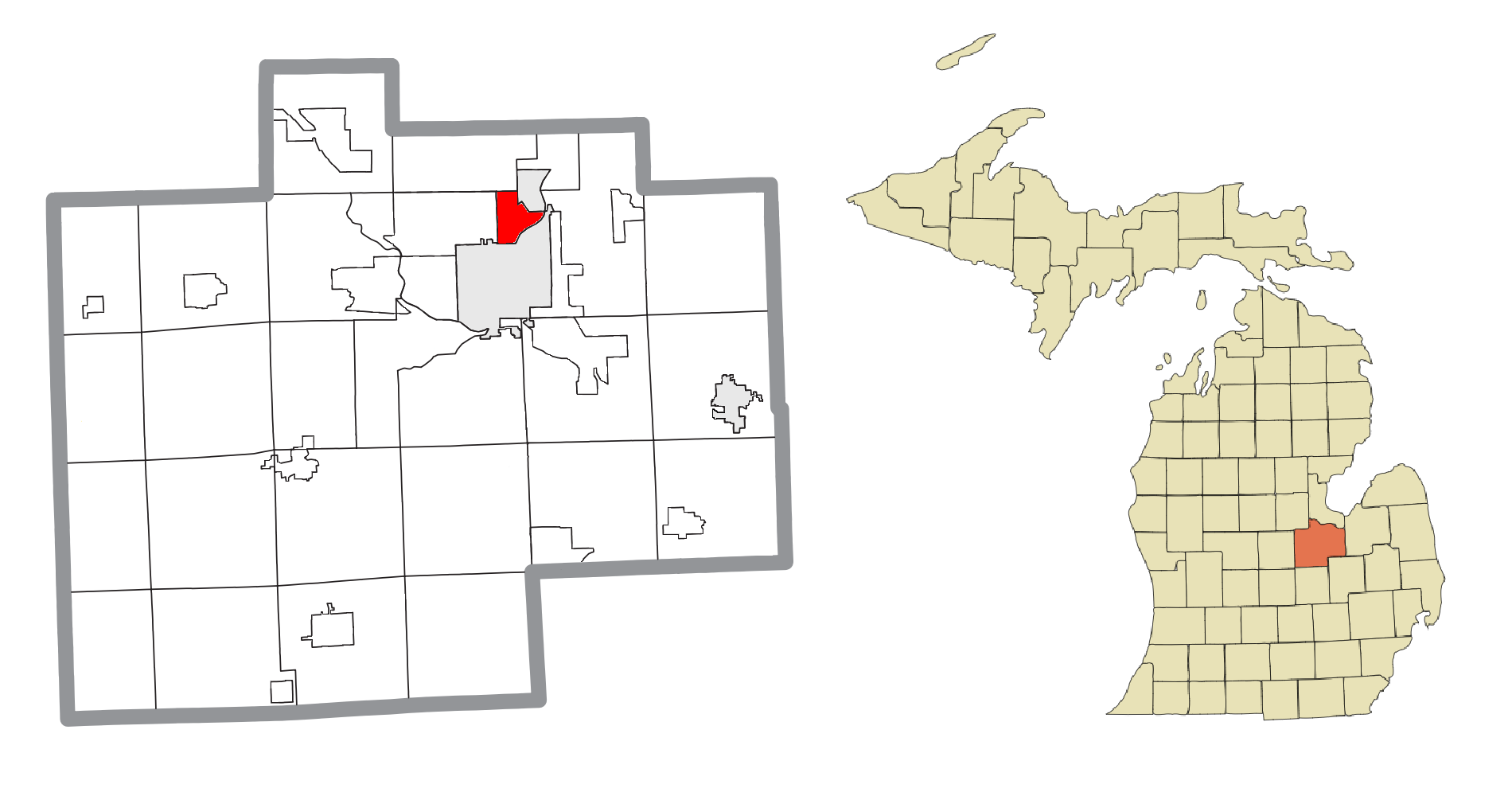
- Location within Saginaw County

- Location within the state of Michigan Carrollton Township (the United States)
- Coordinates: 43°27′34″N 83°56′22″W
- Country: United States
- State: Michigan
- County: Saginaw
- Established: 1866

Government
  - Supervisor: Phillip Abney

Area
  - Total: 3.51 sq mi (9.10 km^{2})
  - Land: 3.34 sq mi (8.64 km^{2})
  - Water: 0.18 sq mi (0.46 km^{2})
- Elevation: 587 ft (179 m)

Population (2020)
  - Total: 5,750
  - Density: 1,720/sq mi (666/km^{2})
- Time zone: UTC-5 (Eastern (EST))
  - Summer (DST): UTC-4 (EDT)
- ZIP code(s): 48604 (Saginaw); 48724 (Carrollton)
- Area code: 989
- FIPS code: 26-13540
- GNIS feature ID: 1626035
- Website: Official website

Carrollton Township (/ˈkɑːrəltən/ KAR-əl-tən) is a civil township of Saginaw County in the U.S. state of Michigan. The population was 5,750 at the 2020 census. Established in 1866, Carrollton contains a full-time police department, fire department, parks and recreation services, as well as its own public school system, Carrollton Public Schools. Along with being located on the Saginaw River, Carrollton offers close access to shopping malls, medical facilities, Saginaw Valley State University, and I-75.

At only 3.34 square miles (8.7 km^{2}) of land area, Carrollton Township is the fourth-smallest township in the state of Michigan, after Novi Township, Royal Oak Charter Township, and Pointe Aux Barques Township.

== Communities ==
- Carrollton is an unincorporated community centered on the Saginaw River. It has a post office with a ZIP Code of 48724 that provides P.O. box service to an area along the Saginaw River that is partly in Carrollton Township and partly in the city of Zilwaukee.
- A Saginaw post office, with ZIP Code 48604, also serves the remainder of Carrollton Township.

== Geography ==
According to the United States Census Bureau, the township has a total area of 3.4 square miles (8.8 km^{2}), of which 3.2 square miles (8.3 km^{2}) is land and 0.2 square miles (0.52 km^{2}) (6.14%) is water.

== Demographics ==
The U.S. Census Bureau has also defined Carrollton Township as a census-designated place (CDP) in the 2000 Census so that the community would appear on the list of places (like cities and villages) as well on the list of county subdivisions (like other townships). The final statistics for the township and the CDP are identical.

As of the census of 2000, there were 6,602 people, 2,559 households, and 1,793 families residing in the township. The population density was 2,056.2 inhabitants per square mile (793.9/km^{2}). There were 2,647 housing units at an average density of 824.4 per square mile (318.3/km^{2}). The racial makeup of the township was 82.58% White, 9.16% African American, 0.50% Native American, 0.68% Asian, 0.02% Pacific Islander, 4.89% from other races, and 2.17% from two or more races. Hispanic or Latino people of any race were 10.77% of the population.

There were 2,559 households, out of which 34.6% had children under the age of 18 living with them, 50.2% were married couples living together, 15.5% had a female householder with no husband present, and 29.9% were non-families. 25.2% of all households were made up of individuals, and 11.3% had someone living alone who was 65 years of age or older. The average household size was 2.58 and the average family size was 3.10.

In the township the population was spread out, with 27.7% under the age of 18, 9.1% from 18 to 24, 28.8% from 25 to 44, 20.0% from 45 to 64, and 14.4% who were 65 years of age or older. The median age was 35 years. For every 100 females, there were 90.7 males. For every 100 females age 18 and over, there were 85.2 males.

The median income for a household in the township was $38,405, and the median income for a family was $43,935. Males had a median income of $36,308 versus $21,172 for females. The per capita income for the township was $16,377. About 7.8% of families and 8.9% of the population were below the poverty line, including 11.7% of those under age 18 and 7.1% of those age 65 or over.
