= Michigan's 101st House of Representatives district =

American legislative district

Michigan's 101st State House of Representatives district
Representative
Joseph Fox; R–Fremont
- Demographics: 86.6% White; 1.8% Black; 5.7% Hispanic; 0.5% Asian; 0.3% Native American; 0.1% Hawaiian/Pacific Islander; 0.6% Other; 4.4% Multiracial
- Population (2024): 94,412

Michigan's 101st House of Representatives district (also referred to as Michigan's 101st House district) is a legislative district within the Michigan House of Representatives located in parts of Lake, Mason, and Oceana counties, as well as all of Newaygo and Wexford counties. The district was created in 1965, when the Michigan House of Representatives district naming scheme changed from a county-based system to a numerical one.

== List of representatives ==
Representative	Party	Dates	Residence	Notes
J. Bob Traxler	Democratic	1965–1974	Bay City	Resigned when elected to the U.S. House of Representatives.
Colleen Engler	Republican	1974–1977	Bay City	
James A. Barcia	Democratic	1977–1983	Bay City	
Thomas L. Hickner	Democratic	1983–1993	Bay City	
William Bobier	Republican	1993–1999	Hesperia	
David C. Mead	Republican	1999–2003	Frankfort	
David W. Palsrok	Republican	2003–2009	Manistee	
Dan Scripps	Democratic	2009–2011	Leland	
Ray Franz	Republican	2011–2017	Onekama	
Curt VanderWall	Republican	2017–2019	Ludington	
Jack O'Malley	Republican	2019–2022	Lake Ann	
Joseph Fox	Republican	2023–present	Fremont	
Jaxon Deur	Republican	(Note: Member-elect.)		

== Recent elections ==
=== 2020s ===
2026 Michigan House of Representatives election
Party	Candidate	Votes	%
Republican	Jaxon Deur	28,074	66.28
Democratic	Christopher R. Crain	14,281	33.72
Total votes		42,355	100
Republican hold			

2024 Michigan House of Representatives election
Party	Candidate	Votes	%
Republican	Joseph Fox	36,451	70.4
Democratic	Christopher Crain	15,300	29.6
Total votes		51,751	100
Republican hold			

2022 Michigan House of Representatives election
Party	Candidate	Votes	%
Republican	Joseph Fox	27,566	67.8
Democratic	Amanda Siggins	13,101	32.2
Total votes		40,667	100
Republican hold			

2020 Michigan House of Representatives election
Party	Candidate	Votes	%
Republican	Jack O'Malley	36,577	60.6
Democratic	Beth McGill-Rizer	23,746	39.4
Total votes		60,323	100
Republican hold			

2018 Michigan House of Representatives election
Party	Candidate	Votes	%
Republican	Jack O'Malley	28,249	57.7
Democratic	Kathy Wiejaczka	20,715	42.3
Total votes		48,964	100
Republican hold			

2016 Michigan House of Representatives election
Party	Candidate	Votes	%
Republican	Curt VanderWall	27,852	54.0
Democratic	Dan Scripps	23,719	46.0
Total votes		51,571	100
Republican hold			

2014 Michigan House of Representatives election
Party	Candidate	Votes	%
Republican	Ray Franz	18,637	50.4
Democratic	Tom Stobie	18,316	49.6
Total votes		36,953	100
Republican hold			

2012 Michigan House of Representatives election
Party	Candidate	Votes	%
Republican	Ray Franz	25,198	51.0
Democratic	Allen O'Shea	24,175	49.0
Total votes		49,373	100
Republican hold			

2010 Michigan House of Representatives election
Party	Candidate	Votes	%
Republican	Ray Franz	19,386	51.2
Democratic	Dan Scripps	18,494	48.8
Total votes		37,880	100
Republican gain from Democratic			

2008 Michigan House of Representatives election
Party	Candidate	Votes	%
Democratic	Dan Scripps	30,979	59.9
Republican	Ray Franz	20,746	40.1
Total votes		51,725	100
Democratic gain from Republican			

== Historical district boundaries ==
Map	Description	Apportionment Plan	Notes
	Bay County (part): Bangor Township; Bay City; Fraser Township; Kawkawlin Township	1964 Apportionment Plan	
	Bay County (part): Bangor Township; Bay City; Essexville; Frankenlust Township; Monitor Township (part)	1972 Apportionment Plan	
	Bay County (part): Auburn; Bay City; Beaver Township; Essexville; Frankenlust Township; Fraser Township; Garfield Township; Gibson Township; Kawkawlin Township; Midland (part); Monitor Township; Mount Forest Township; Pinconning; Pinconning Township; Portsmouth Township; Williams Township	1982 Apportionment Plan	
	Benzie County; Manistee County; Mason County; Oceana County	1992 Apportionment Plan	
	Benzie County; Leelanau County; Manistee County; Mason County	2001 Apportionment Plan	
	Benzie County; Leelanau County; Manistee County; Mason County	2011 Apportionment Plan	
