= Michigan's 96th House of Representatives district =

American legislative district

Michigan's 96th State House of Representatives district
Representative
Timothy Beson; R–Bay City
- Demographics: 87.7% White; 1% Black; 6.2% Hispanic; 0.5% Asian; 0.1% Native American; 0.1% Hawaiian/Pacific Islander; 0.5% Other; 3.8% Multiracial
- Population (2024): 89,877

Michigan's 96th House of Representatives district (also referred to as Michigan's 96th House district) is a legislative district within the Michigan House of Representatives located in part of Bay County. The district was created in 1965, when the Michigan House of Representatives district naming scheme changed from a county-based system to a numerical one.

== List of representatives ==
Representative	Party	Dates	Residence	Notes
Francis W. Beedon	Democratic	1965–1968	Muskegon	
Gerrit C. Hasper	Democratic	1969–1980	Muskegon	
M. L. Mickey Knight	Republican	1981–1992	Muskegon	
Roland J. Jersevic	Republican	1993–1996	Saginaw Township	
A.T. Frank	Democratic	1997–2002	Saginaw Township	
Joseph Rivet	Democratic	2003–2004	Bay City	
Jeff Mayes	Democratic	2005–2010	Bay City	
Charles Brunner	Democratic	2011–2016	Bay City	
Brian Elder	Democratic	2017–2020	Bay City	
Timothy Beson	Republican	2021–present	Bay City	

== Recent elections ==
=== 2020s ===
2026 Michigan House of Representatives election
Party	Candidate	Votes	%
Republican	Timothy Beson (incumbent)	22,607	52.92
Democratic	Christopher R. Girard	20,115	47.08
Total votes		42,722	100
Republican hold			

2024 Michigan House of Representatives election
Party	Candidate	Votes	%
Republican	Timothy Beson	31,135	60.3
Democratic	Rudy Howard	20,474	39.7
Total votes		51,609	100
Republican hold			

2022 Michigan House of Representatives election
Party	Candidate	Votes	%
Republican	Timothy Beson	23,373	55.3
Democratic	Kim Coonan	18,881	44.7
Total votes		42,254	100
Republican hold			

2020 Michigan House of Representatives election
Party	Candidate	Votes	%
Republican	Timothy Beson	25,655	54.6
Democratic	Brian Elder	21,328	45.4
Total votes		46,983	100
Republican gain from Democratic			

2018 Michigan House of Representatives election
Party	Candidate	Votes	%
Democratic	Brian Elder	20,175	56.5
Republican	Susan Kay Kowalski	15,527	43.5
Total votes		35,702	100
Democratic hold			

2016 Michigan House of Representatives election
Party	Candidate	Votes	%
Democratic	Brian Elder	22,992	58.0
Republican	David Scholl	16,665	42.0
Total votes		39,657	100
Democratic hold			

2014 Michigan House of Representatives election
Party	Candidate	Votes	%
Democratic	Charles Brunner	13,149	68.1
Republican	Carlos Jaime	6,169	31.9
Total votes		19,318	100
Democratic hold			

2012 Michigan House of Representatives election
Party	Candidate	Votes	%
Democratic	Charles Brunner	28,263	69.5
Republican	Chad Dewey	12,428	30.5
Total votes		40,691	100
Democratic hold			

2010 Michigan House of Representatives election
Party	Candidate	Votes	%
Democratic	Charles Brunner	17,052	52.1
Republican	Dennis Poirier	15,668	47.9
Total votes		32,720	100
Democratic hold			

2008 Michigan House of Representatives election
Party	Candidate	Votes	%
Democratic	Jeff Mayes	32,208	69.8
Republican	Richard Rau	13,950	30.2
Total votes		46,158	100
Democratic hold			

== Historical district boundaries ==
Map	Description	Apportionment Plan	Notes
	Muskegon County (part): Muskegon; Muskegon Heights; Muskegon Township (part)	1964 Apportionment Plan	
	Muskegon County (part): Fruitport Township (part); Muskegon; Muskegon Heights; Muskegon Township; North Muskegon (part)	1972 Apportionment Plan	
	Muskegon County (part): Fruitland Township; Laketon Township; Montague; Montague Township; Muskegon; Muskegon Township; North Muskegon; Whitehall; Whitehall Township; White River Township	1982 Apportionment Plan	
	Bay County (part): Essexville; Frankenlust Township; Hampton Township; Merritt Township; Monitor Township; Portsmouth Township; Saginaw County (part): Blumfield Township; Carrollton Township; Kochville Township; Saginaw Township; Zilwaukee; Zilwaukee Township	1992 Apportionment Plan	
	Bay County (part): Auburn; Bangor Township; Bay City; Beaver Township; Essexville; Frankenlust Township; Hampton Township; Merritt Township; Midland (part); Monitor Township; Portsmouth Township; Williams Township	2001 Apportionment Plan	
	Bay County (part): Bangor Township; Bay City; Essexville; Frankenlust Township; Hampton Township; Kawkawlin Township; Merritt Township; Monitor Township; Portsmouth Township	2011 Apportionment Plan	
