= Jeff Mayes =

American politician (born 1971)

Member of the Michigan House of Representatives from the 96th district
- In office January 1, 2005 – December 31, 2010
- Preceded by: Joseph Rivet
- Succeeded by: Charles Brunner

Personal details
- Born: April 26, 1971 (age 55)
- Party: Democratic
- Education: University of Michigan

Jeffrey Mayes (born April 26, 1971) is a Democratic politician from the U.S. state of Michigan. He is the immediate past representative the 96th House district, based in Bay City, and includes the bottom half of Bay County. While in the House, he chaired the Agriculture Committee.

== Early life ==
Mayes graduated from T. L. Handy High School in 1990 and received a Bachelor of Arts Degree in Political Science in 1994 from the University of Michigan, where he was an Evans Scholar. He served as an aid to state representatives Howard Wetters and Joseph Rivet before being himself elected to the State House in 2004. He is a Roman Catholic and lives in Bay City.

== Political career ==
He served as Supervisor of the Charter Township of Bangor from 2000 to 2004. Mayes was elected to the House in 2004 to replace Democrat Joseph Rivet, who retired due to term limits. He represents the 96th district, which is heavily Democratic. Mayes was easily re-elected in 2006. In 2006, he was appointed chairman of the Agriculture Committee, which deals with all agriculture and farming related issues in Michigan. He is also an Eagle Scout through Troop 108 of Bay City, Michigan.

Preceded by Joseph Rivet	Michigan State Representative, 96th District; 2005 - 2010	Succeeded by Charles Brunner
