= Kawkawlin =

Kawkawlin may refer to the geographic locations in the U.S. state of Michigan:

- Kawkawlin Township, Michigan
- Kawkawlin, Michigan, an unincorporated community in Monitor township
- Kawkawlin River, namesake for both the township and community
