= Kawkawlin River =

Location
- Country: United States

Physical characteristics
- Source
  - location: Bay County, Michigan
- Mouth
  - location: Saginaw Bay, Lake Huron

The Kawkawlin River is a 17.5-mile-long (28.2 km) stream in the U.S. state of Michigan that flows into Saginaw Bay of Lake Huron at 43°39′30″N 83°53′00″W, approximately 1 mile (1.6 km) west of the mouth of the Saginaw River.

== Etymology ==
The name Kawkawlin comes from the Ojibwe word ogaakaaning, which means "place of pike (fish)"; the Kawkawlin River was historically known for its abundance of pike.

== Geography ==
The Kawkawlin has two main branches, the North Branch, which is the longer branch, and the South Branch, which is also known as simply the Kawkawlin River. The confluence of the north and south branches northwest of Bay City at 43°38′43″N 83°57′11″W, 4.7 miles from the mouth of the river. The North Branch rises from the confluence of Hoffman Drain and Watson Drain at 43°49′48″N 84°10′21″W, at the southeast corner of Gladwin County. Upstream from the confluence with the North Branch, the Kawkawlin (or the South Branch), rises from the confluence of Dietline and Betzoid drains at 43°39′32″N 84°04′01″W.

The Kawkawlin River system drains all or portions of the following townships:

- In Bay County
  - Bangor Township
  - Beaver Township
  - Garfield Township
  - Kawkawlin Township
  - Monitor Township
  - Mount Forest
  - Williams Township
- In Gladwin County
  - Bentley Township
  - Grim Township (via Chubb Drain)
- In Midland County
  - Larkin Township (via Waldo Drain and the Dietline Drain system)
  - Midland Township (via Dingman and Waldo drains)
  - Mills Township (via Kawkawlin Creek)
- In Saginaw County
  - Tittabawassee Township (via Culver Creek)

== Tributaries ==
- (right) Indian Town Drain
- (left) Millpond Drain
- (right) North Branch Kawkawlin River
  - (left) Popp Drain
  - (left) Hembling Drain
    - (right) McNally Drain
    - (right) Reinhardt Drain
    - (left) Everson Drain
  - (left) Garvey Drain
  - (right) Kerr Drain
  - (left) Lapan Drain
  - (left) Bedell Drain
  - (left) Hearit Drain
  - (right) McDonald Drain
  - (right) Kawalski Drain
  - (right) Crump Drain
  - (right) Renner Drain
  - (left) Sequin Drain
  - (left) Bleshenski Drain
  - (left) Torey Drain
  - (left) Gunn Drain
  - (left) Kawkawlin Creek
    - (right) Herner Drain
      - (right) Wright Drain
    - Kawkawlin Creek Flooding
  - (left) Hoffman Drain
  - (right) Watson Drain
    - (left) Chubb Drain
    - (right) Gear Drain
- (right) Hildebrandt Drain
  - (left) Anderson Drain
- (left) Culver Creek
- (left) Wolverine Drain
- (left) Bradford Creek
- (left) Pine Drain
- (left) Phillips Drain
- (left) Hoppler Creek
  - (left) Dell Creek
- (left) Perry Creek
- (left) Dingman Drain
  - (left) Mason Drain
- (left) DeShano Drain
- (right) Betzold Drain
  - (right) Campbell Drain
- (left) Dietline Drain
  - (left) Cassube Drain
  - (left) Waldo Drain
    - (right) Davis Drain
      - (left) Shinbines Drain
      - (right) Prasty Drain
    - (left) Livingstone Drain
    - (left) Wenglikowski Drain
  - (left) Vogtman Drain
  - (left) Panzer Drain
  - (right) Kaiser Drain
  - (left) Kraweck Drain
    - (left) Pashok Drain
