= Joseph Rivet =

American politician

Bay City Commissioner
- In office 2023 – January 2025
- Preceded by: Kristen McDonald Rivet

Member of the Michigan House of Representatives
- In office 1999–2004
- Preceded by: Howard Wetters
- Succeeded by: Jeff Mayes
- Constituency: 96th district (2003–2004); 97th district (1999–2002)

Drain Commissioner of Bay County
- In office 2005–2021
- Preceded by: William Rosebush
- Succeeded by: Michael Rivard

Personal details
- Born: May 20, 1965 (age 61) Bay City, Michigan
- Party: Democratic
- Spouse: Kristen McDonald Rivet
- Children: 6
- Education: Michigan State University (MBA)

Joseph L. Rivet is a former Democratic politician from Michigan, most recently serving the remainder of his wife’s term on the Bay City Commission. He previously served three terms in the Michigan House of Representatives from the 97th and 96th districts between 1999 and 2004. Rivet also served as Bay County Drain Commissioner and supervisor of Bangor Township.

Rivet earned both a bachelor's degree and his M.B.A. at Michigan State University. In addition to his elected offices, he was a legislative aide in the Michigan House and the executive director of the Bay County Convention and Visitors Bureau.

Rivet was ousted as Bay County Drain Commissioner in November 2020 by Bay County Road Commissioner Michael Rivard, a rematch of a prior election for the same office held in 2012. In December 2022, Rivet was appointed to the Bay City Commission to serve the remainder of his wife's term. He took that office the following month in January 2023. Rivet did not run for a full term on the Commission and left office in December 2024.
