= Ray Franz =

Ray Franz may refer to:

- Raymond Franz (1922–2010), member of the Governing Body of Jehovah's Witnesses
- Ray Franz (politician), member of the Michigan House of Representatives
