= Jack O'Malley =

Jack O'Malley may refer to:

- Jack O'Malley (Michigan politician)
- Jack O'Malley (Illinois politician)
- Jack O'Malley, a fictional character played by Chris Evans in the 2024 film Red One
