= Bangor Township Schools =

School district in Michigan

Location
- Bay County, Michigan; United States
- Coordinates: 43.60386°N 83.91945°W

District information
- Grades: Pre-school - 12
- President: Jason Forgash
- Vice-president: Mark Seymour
- Superintendent: Matthew Schmidt
- Schools: 6
- Budget: US$30,855,000 (2022-23)
- NCES District ID: 2603900

Students and staff
- Students: 2,646 (2022-23)
- Teachers: 145.47 (2022-23)
- Staff: 264.79 (2022-2023)
- Student–teacher ratio: 18.19 (2022-2023)

Other information
- Website: www.bangorschools.org

Bangor Township Schools is a school district headquartered in Bangor Township, Bay County, Michigan, near Bay City.

== History ==
John Glenn High School opened in 1965. In 1997, Bangor Junior High School was renamed to Christa McAuliffe Middle School in keeping with the space theme of the school district.

== Schools ==
Secondary:

- John Glenn High School
- Christa McAuliffe Middle School, formerly Bangor Junior High School (-1997) mascot changed with the school's name from the Bangor Badgers to the Comets

Primary:

- Bangor Central Elementary School
- Bangor Lincoln Elementary School
- Bangor West Central Elementary School

Preschool:

- Bangor North Preschool

== Sports ==
John Glenn High School was a member of the North East Michigan Conference. In 2010 that conference stopped being an all-sports league, which began a search for a new conference. In October 2016, Glenn was admitted as a member of the Saginaw Valley League starting in the 2017–2018 school year.
