= Portsmouth Township =

Portsmouth Township may refer to:

- Portsmouth Township, Michigan
- Portsmouth Township, Carteret County, North Carolina, in Carteret County, North Carolina
