= Blessing the Children International =

Nonprofit organization

- Type: 501(c)(3)
- Founder: Keith V. Strawn
- Headquarters: Kawkawlin, Michigan, U.S.

Blessing the Children International (BCI) is a 501(c)(3) non-profit organization, founded in 2001, that engages in Christian missionary work in Ethiopia, Africa. According to the Urban Institute, BCI is classified as an "International Relief" organization.

BCI built and operate the BCI Academy, the Adana Children Center, and support orphaned and impoverished children through a foster care program. In addition, BCI hosts mission teams to Ethiopia throughout the year.

BCI partners with several ministries, individuals, and organizations to effect its work in Ethiopia. Their strategy is to work through and equip local churches in Ethiopia to carry out the work of the ministry. In 2009, BCI partnered with 5 local churches in Debre Zeyit, Ethiopia. Working with Ethiopian church leaders and staff, the neediest orphaned and impoverished children are accepted into the Adana Children program and placed in homes with loving families. BCI raises support through donations, copy writing, print work, teams, and a child sponsorship program.

== History ==
Blessing the Children International was founded by Keith V. Strawn in 2001 in El Salvador as a means to carry out his vision of helping impoverished children in foreign countries. Shortly after creation, BCI joined a partner ministry in El Salvador to improve donor communications through regular mailings and by publishing regular newsletters. In 2002, BCI partnered with the Blair Foundation to administrate their church planting in Ethiopia. BCI was responsible for developing and managing all aspects of the program, including a report collection system to keep sponsors informed of their sponsored missionary's progress.

In January 2004, BCI launched the Ethiopian Call Ministry through a partner ministry, planting 1,000 new churches in the remote villages of Ethiopia over the next two years. Previously, only seven churches existed in the entire region of almost 1 million people. BCI fully administrated all aspects of the program; missionary deployment, tracking, and data collection for communications to more than 1,500 donors. The goal was achieved and the one thousandth church was planted September 15, 2006.

In January 2006, BCI launched the Kamashi Orphanage & School in a remote area of Benishangul Gumuz, Ethiopia, at the request of President Yaregal Ashishem. The Kamashi Orphanage is a 500-bed facility built by the government in 2003, and sat empty for three years due to the government having no operational budget. The orphanage was given to BCI free of charge and they received the first 38 children in January, 2006. By November 2006, the number of children accepted had risen to 141.

In April 2006, The first team visited the Kamashi Orphanage & School. BCI began recruiting and hosting mission trips to Ethiopia. In August 2006, BCI launched a short-term missionary program, whereby volunteers from America and aboard are able to serve long term in Ethiopia. In the same month, the first two short-term missionaries arrived. Missionaries followed, teaching and caring for children to "Make a difference in the world", according to the University of South Carolina Upstate.

In October 2007, BCI announced plans to start a ministry in the Debre Zeyit area of Ethiopia. The Adana Children Center is a school, community center, and foster care program. The word 'Adana' means 'Rescue' in Amharic. In January 2008, BCI launched the new program in Debre Zeyit, whereby over the next five years, 600 orphaned children were planned to be rescued and provided wholesome families to care for them as their own children.

In November 2008, BCI broke ground for the construction of the BCI Academy (school) & Adana Children Center (community center) in Debre Zeyit, Ethiopia. Along with serving the community, this center was also to house the BCI Academy, opening with grades 1st through 4th, to eventually offer grades K-12.

In September 2009, BCI announced the completion of phase one construction and the opening of the BCI Academy to 83 students in grades 1st through 4th.

In October 2009, the BCI Academy began construction of Phase Two, adding 6 additional classrooms.

== Current work ==
During BCI's first few years, BCI principally focused on partnering with like-minded ministries to increase their effectiveness and assist them in program development and implementation. Working with over 30 non-profit organizations in America, Central America, and Africa to help them measure, document, and communicate the results of their ministries to their donors.

Currently, BCI continues consulting, copy writing and print work for like-minded ministries, but also has direct project in Ethiopia, Africa. The Ethiopian ministry consists of 3 primary venues; BCI Academy & Adana Children Center, a Child Sponsorship program, and Teams & Missionaries. All three of these activities focus around the Adana Children Center, their current project.

=== BCI Academy & Adana Children Center ===
The Adana Children Center is a compound built by Blessing the Children International in Debre Zeyit, Ethiopia (phase one of four finished, scheduled to be completed by 2012). The compound will consist of a community center, a private school, and a housing area and is being built on 5,000 square meters of land provided by the Ethiopian government. According to the published construction plan & budget, the entire compound is to be built in four phases and will cost $243,205 USD to build.

One of the schools that BCI uses to educate the children the BCI Academy, initially called the "American Academy of Excellence", located in the Adana Children Center. When completed, it will seat 350 students at 27 students per classroom. The Academy is being built to supply the need of quality education in Debre Zeyit and the surrounding area. As a private school being operated at first-world standards, English will be the principle medium of instruction in all classes instead of the native language of the region, Amharic. As a result, there will be much more advanced educational curriculum available to them than to schools teaching in Amharic. The compound, when not being used for school, in the afternoons and evenings, will be available for community service programs, focusing on the physical, emotional, and spiritual needs of both children and adults in the community.

At completion, the Adana Children Center will have housing and kitchen facilities, providing living quarters for up to 24 people. These accommodations are available to children in special circumstances, short- and long-term missionaries, foreign teachers, and teams serving BCI. This facility is not intended to be an orphanage or permanent residency for children, since BCI prefers children be raised in a family within their community, where they would receive more individual attention.

=== Child Sponsorship Program ===
Blessing the Children provides relief and support to children through child sponsorships. Individual and corporate sponsors can support specific children with a $30/month sponsorship or for those desiring to be a child's only sponsor, some choose to fully sponsor a child with $90/month. Sponsorships provide all of the services and support that the child needs, including full tuition, shoes and clothes, medical care, food, shelter, and vocational training for both the child and the foster family. The need for sponsorship is clearest to those who experience the need first-hand, as teams returning frequently sponsor children.

Dissimilar to other non-profit organisations, BCI pay no overhead expenses from donations for sponsorships or projects. Generally, non-profit ministries spend an average of 20% or more of their revenues on overhead expenses. Blessing the Children also has overhead expenses, but they are paid from revenues generated by BCI's printing and other services to other ministries. Therefore, no portion of donations for sponsorships or projects is spent on overhead.

=== Teams & Missionaries ===
Blessing the Children hosts 10 prescheduled trips to Ethiopia each year, open to individuals from anywhere in the world. These trips are frequently life changing experiences. A Baltimore Ravens Cheerleader says after returning from her trip, “You hear about the poverty situation in Africa through [sporadic] media coverage, however, no news story on the subject will ever truly depict the brutality and reality that these people are faced with day in and day out, struggling to survive.”

Scheduled trips are 2 weeks long, but missionaries can extend their stay as long as desired. Additionally, BCI hosts custom teams for churches, schools, and other organizations. As a full-service ministry, BCI handles the entire planning process for teams and missionaries; meals, lodging, translators, guides, taxes, tips, airport pickup in Ethiopia, local transport in Ethiopia, and airfare booking & ticketing. They are currently in the process of setting up internships and a study abroad program for college students.

BCI’s main ministry options for teams and missionaries are as follows:

- Children & Youth Ministry – Vacation Bible School, dramas, puppets, crafts, worship, skits, games, Bible stories, speaking at youth gatherings and devotionals
- Sports Ministry – Football, baseball, basketball, volleyball, and especially soccer
- School Ministry – Aid teachers in classes, teach special subjects, hold rallies, participate in recess, tutor students, fellowship with children before & after school
- Service Projects – Home repairs for widows and impoverished families, digging water wells, constructing sanitary facilities, providing food & home visits
- Medical & Dental Care – Groups with medical dental staff can do physical checkups on sponsored children and their families during home visits or host a free health clinic
- Construction – There is always a need for people to help with construction at the new school, with homes for the poor, and in the local churches
- Ministry of Helps – Pastoral care, visiting shut-ins, hospital visitation, ministering to pastors' wives and otherwise assisting the pastoral staff of local churches
- Church Ministries – Attend and participate in church services, Sunday school classes and prayer meetings
- Evangelism – Hand out Bibles, door-to-door evangelism, street evangelism, clowning, miming, juggling, and drama; larger groups can hold special evangelistic crusades
- Adult Ministry – Parenting classes, Bible studies, topical studies, leadership training, coffee & tea socials to minister to the women, and special men’s gatherings

Blessing the Children teams and missionaries stay in BCI guest houses. Their guest houses are meant to be comfortable by resembling an American house, with bedrooms, a living room, dining room, bathroom, and kitchen. Though not typical in Ethiopia, bathrooms have hot water. The kitchens are small, but equipped with the essentials, and meals are usually prepared family-style.
