= Howard Wetters =

American politician

Howard J. Wetters

Member of the Michigan House of Representatives from the 97th district
- In office January 1, 1993 – December 31, 1998
- Preceded by: Paul Baade
- Succeeded by: Joseph Rivet

Personal details
- Born: June 6, 1952 (age 74)
- Citizenship: U.S. Citizen
- Party: Democratic
- Spouse: Juliann
- Children: Hanna
- Education: Michigan State University
- Committees: Taxation, Agriculture, Conservation & Environment

Howard J. Wetters is a former Democratic politician from Michigan who served in the Michigan House of Representatives representing northern Bay County for most of the 1990s. Wetters also unsuccessfully ran for Bay County Clerk in 2012, challenging the incumbent Cynthia A. Luczak.
