= 2024 Bay County Executive election =

- November 5, 2024
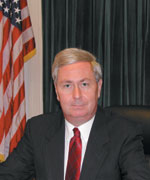

Nominee	James Barcia	Kevin Shark
Party	Democratic	Republican
Popular vote	28,816	28,055
Percentage	50.67%	49.33%
Bay County Executive before election
James Barcia
Democratic
Elected Bay County Executive
James Barcia
Democratic

The 2024 Bay County Executive election was held on November 5, 2024. Incumbent County Executive James Barcia ran for re-election. He was challenged by Bay County Road Commissioner Kevin Shark, who defeated Charles Juers, Barcia's 2020 opponent, in the Republican primary. Barcia defeated Shark by a narrow margin, winning a third term with just 50.7 percent of the vote, despite Donald Trump's landslide win in the county in the presidential election.

== Democratic primary ==
=== Candidates ===
- James Barcia, incumbent County Executive

=== Results ===
Democratic primary results
Party	Candidate	Votes	%
Democratic	James Barcia (inc.)	10,030	100.00%
Total votes		10,030	100.00%

== Republican primary ==
=== Candidates ===
- Kevin Shark,Bay County Road Commissioner
- Charles A. Juers, 2020 Republican nominee for County Executive, service technician

=== Results ===
Republican primary results
Party	Candidate	Votes	%
Republican	Kevin Shark	6,369	72.85%
Republican	Charles A. Juers	2,374	27.15%
Total votes		8,743	100.00%

== General election ==
=== Results ===
2024 Bay County Executive election
Party	Candidate	Votes	%
Democratic	James Barcia (inc.)	28,816	50.67%
Republican	Kevin Shark	28,055	49.33%
Total votes		56,871	100.00%
Democratic hold			
