= 2020 Bay County Executive election =

- November 3, 2020
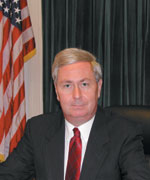

Nominee	James Barcia	Charles A. Juers
Party	Democratic	Republican
Popular vote	34,506	23,355
Percentage	59.47%	40.25%
Bay County Executive before election
James Barcia
Democratic
Elected Bay County Executive
James Barcia
Democratic

The 2020 Bay County Executive election was held on November 3, 2020. Incumbent County Executive James Barcia ran for re-election to a second term. He was challenged by businessman Charles Juers, the Republican nominee. Despite Bay County's support for Donald Trump in the 2016 and 2020 presidential elections, Barcia defeated Juers in a landslide, winning re-election with 59 percent of the vote.

== Democratic primary ==
=== Candidates ===
- James Barcia, incumbent County Executive

=== Results ===
Democratic primary results
Party	Candidate	Votes	%
Democratic	James Barcia (inc.)	13,975	99.80%
Democratic	Write-ins	28	0.20%
Total votes		14,003	100.00%

== Republican primary ==
=== Candidates ===
- Charles A. Juers, businessman

=== Results ===
Republican primary results
Party	Candidate	Votes	%
Republican	Charles A. Juers	7,717	99.55%
Republican	Write-ins	35	0.45%
Total votes		7,752	100.00%

== General election ==
=== Results ===
2020 Bay County Executive election
Party	Candidate	Votes	%
Democratic	James Barcia (inc.)	34,506	59.47%
Republican	Charles A. Juers	23,355	40.25%
Write-in		159	2.25%
Total votes		58,020	100.00%
Democratic hold			
