= Dan Scripps =

American politician (born 1976)

Member of the Michigan House of Representatives from the 101st district
- In office 2009–2010
- Succeeded by: Ray Franz

Personal details
- Born: Daniel Collins Scripps; August 26, 1976 (age 49) Grand Rapids, Michigan, U.S.
- Party: Democratic
- Spouse: Jamie
- Children: 2
- Education: Alma College (BA); University of Michigan (JD)
- Occupation: Politician

Dan Scripps (born August 26, 1976) is an American politician and public official. He was a member of the Michigan House of Representatives for the state's 101st district until losing to Republican Ray Franz in November 2010. The district includes Leelanau, Benzie, Manistee and Mason counties, on the northwest coast of Michigan's lower peninsula.

He attended Alma College during his undergraduate years. He received his Juris Doctor degree from the University of Michigan Law School in 2005. Beginning as a summer intern in 2004, he was employed by Latham & Watkins Law Firm in Washington, D.C., until running for office in 2006. He returned to Latham & Watkins in 2011 until moving back to Michigan in late 2012, where he served as President of the Michigan Energy Innovation Business Council.

In February 2019, Governor Gretchen Whitmer appointed him to the Michigan Public Service Commission, and he was named Chair in July 2020. His term expires in July 2029.
