= Brian Elder =

American politician

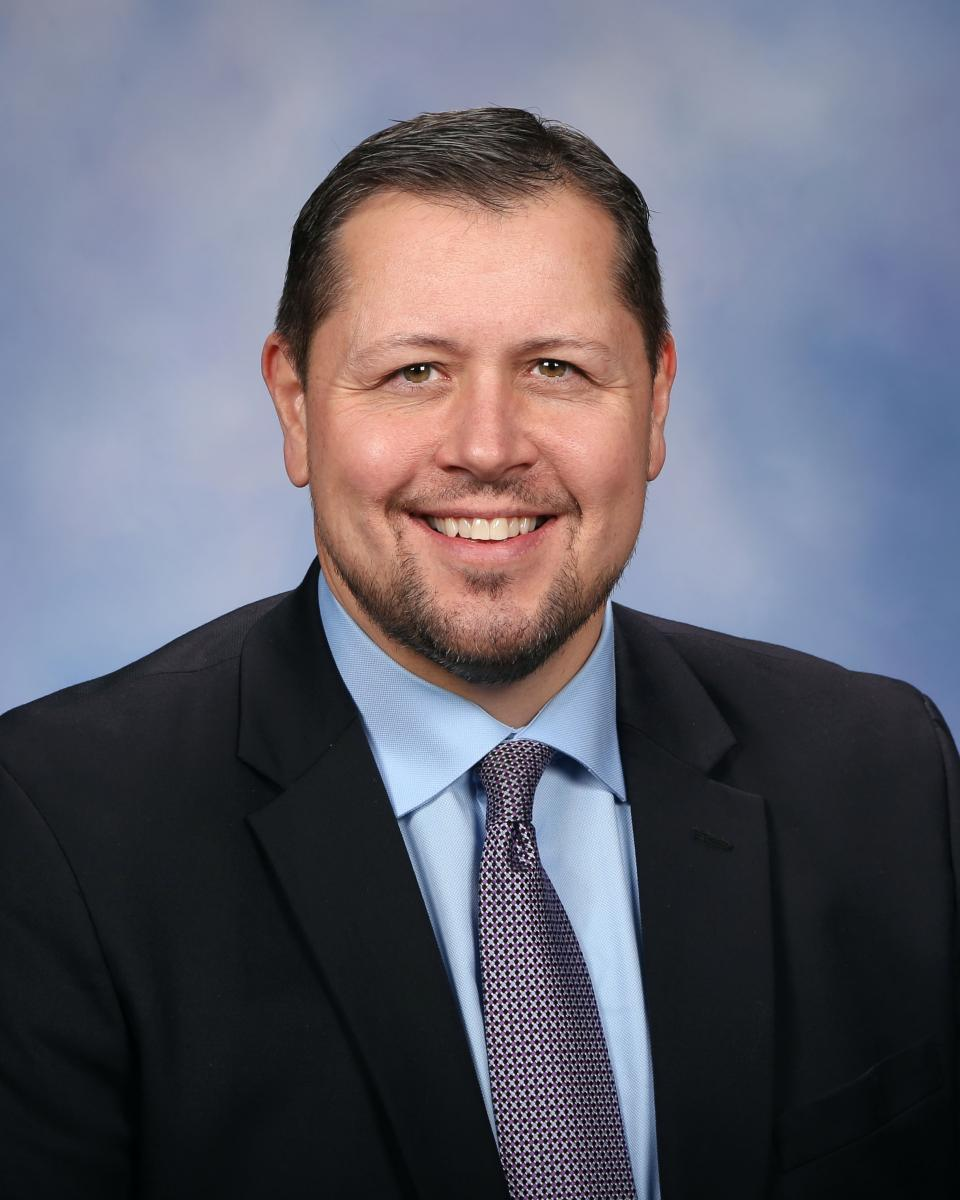

Member of the Michigan House of Representatives from the 96th district
- In office January 1, 2017 – January 1, 2021
- Preceded by: Charles Brunner
- Succeeded by: Timothy Beson

Personal details
- Party: Democratic
- Spouse: Susan
- Education: UCLA School of Law; Wayne State University
- Profession: Attorney
- Website: State Rep. Brian Elder

Brian Elder is a former Democratic member of the Michigan House of Representatives, having represented the 96th House District which includes Bay City, Essexville, Bangor, Frankenlust, Hampton, Kawkawlin, Merritt, Monitor and Portsmouth townships in Bay County.

Prior to his election to the House, Elder was a member of the Bay County Board of Commissioners.

== Personal life ==
Elder graduated summa cum laude and Phi Beta Kappa from Wayne State University with a degree in History. He then went on to graduate from the UCLA School of Law.

Elder has been practicing law in Michigan since 1998 and currently owns Brian K. Elder, P.L.C., a general civil law practice.

Elder lives in Bay City and is married to Susan Elder. He is the father of three children.

== Political career ==
Elder served eight years as a Bay County Commissioner and served as the chairman of the Bay County Board of Commissioners.

Brian was elected to the Michigan House of Representatives in 2016.
