= Joseph Fox (Michigan politician) =

American politician from Michigan

Joseph D. Fox

Member of the Michigan House of Representatives from the 101st district
- Incumbent
- Assumed office January 1, 2023
- Preceded by: Jack O'Malley (redistricting)
- Succeeded by: Jaxon Deur (elect)

Personal details
- Born: Tecumseh, Michigan
- Party: Republican
- Education: Spring Arbor College; Western Michigan University

Joseph D. Fox is an American politician from Michigan who has represented the 101st district in the Michigan House of Representatives since the 2022 election. He was reelected in 2024.

== See also ==
- Official website at the Michigan House of Representatives
- Campaign website
