= Charles Brunner =

American politician

Charles M. Brunner

Member of the Michigan House of Representatives from the 96th district
- In office January 1, 2011 – December 31, 2016
- Preceded by: Jeff Mayes
- Succeeded by: Brian Elder

Mayor of Bay City, Michigan
- In office 2007 – November 30, 2010
- Preceded by: Robert J. Katt
- Succeeded by: Christopher J. Shannon

Member of the Bay City Commission
- In office 2001–2007

Personal details
- Born: April 15, 1952 (age 74) Bay City, Michigan
- Party: Democratic
- Spouse: Judy
- Education: Central Michigan University; Delta College
- Website: State Representative Charles M. Brunner

Charles M. Brunner (born April 15, 1952) is a Democratic politician from Michigan currently serving in the Michigan House of Representatives. He is a former mayor of Bay City.

Prior to his time in elected office, Brunner was a teacher for 30 years. Once mayor, he was a founding member of what was once known as the Mayors Automotive Coalition, now the Manufacturing Alliance of Communities, and started several other city initiatives including a community clean-up and an adopt-a-park program.

Formerly a musician, Brunner played with the rock group Question Mark and the Mysterians.
