= John Glenn High School (Bangor Township, Michigan) =

Location
- 3201 Kiesel Road; Bay City, Michigan 48706; United States; 43.6178°N 83.9266°W

Information
- Type: Public
- Motto: "Imagine · Inspire · Innovate"
- Established: 1965
- School district: Bangor Township Schools
- Superintendent: Matt Schmidt
- Principal: Kevin Biskup
- Teaching staff: 32.20 (on an FTE basis)
- Grades: 9-12
- Enrollment: 893 (2023-2024)
- Student to teacher ratio: 27.73
- Colors: Blue; White
- Athletics: MHSAA Class B
- Athletics conference: Tri-Valley Conference (Central Division)
- Mascot: Bobcat
- Yearbook: Blazon
- Website: www.bangorschools.org/o/jghs

John Glenn High School is a public school that is part of Bangor Township Schools. This high school is located in Bangor Township, adjacent to Bay City, Michigan.

== History ==
John Glenn High School which was opened in 1965 was named for astronaut John Glenn, who three years prior had become the first American to orbit the Earth.

== Demographics ==
The demographic breakdown of the 849 students enrolled in 2022-23 was:

- Male - 48.6%
- Female - 51.4%
- Native American - 0.1%
- Asian - 1.2%
- Black - 1.5%
- Hispanic - 10.1%
- White - 83.0%
- Multiracial - 4.0%

In addition, 42.64% of students were eligible for reduced-price or free lunch.
