= Timothy Beson =

American politician

Member of the Michigan House of Representatives
- Incumbent
- Assumed office January 1, 2021
- Preceded by: Brian Elder
- Constituency: 96th district

Personal details
- Party: Republican
- Spouse: Lisa Len-Beson
- Children: 3

Timothy Beson is an American Republican politician from Michigan. He was elected to the Michigan House of Representatives from the 96th district in 2020, defeating incumbent State Representative Brian Elder. Formally serving on the Bangor Township Schools Board of Education, Beson also owned and operated Beson's Market.

He was reelected in 2022 and in 2024.
