= Linwood, Michigan =

- Unincorporated community
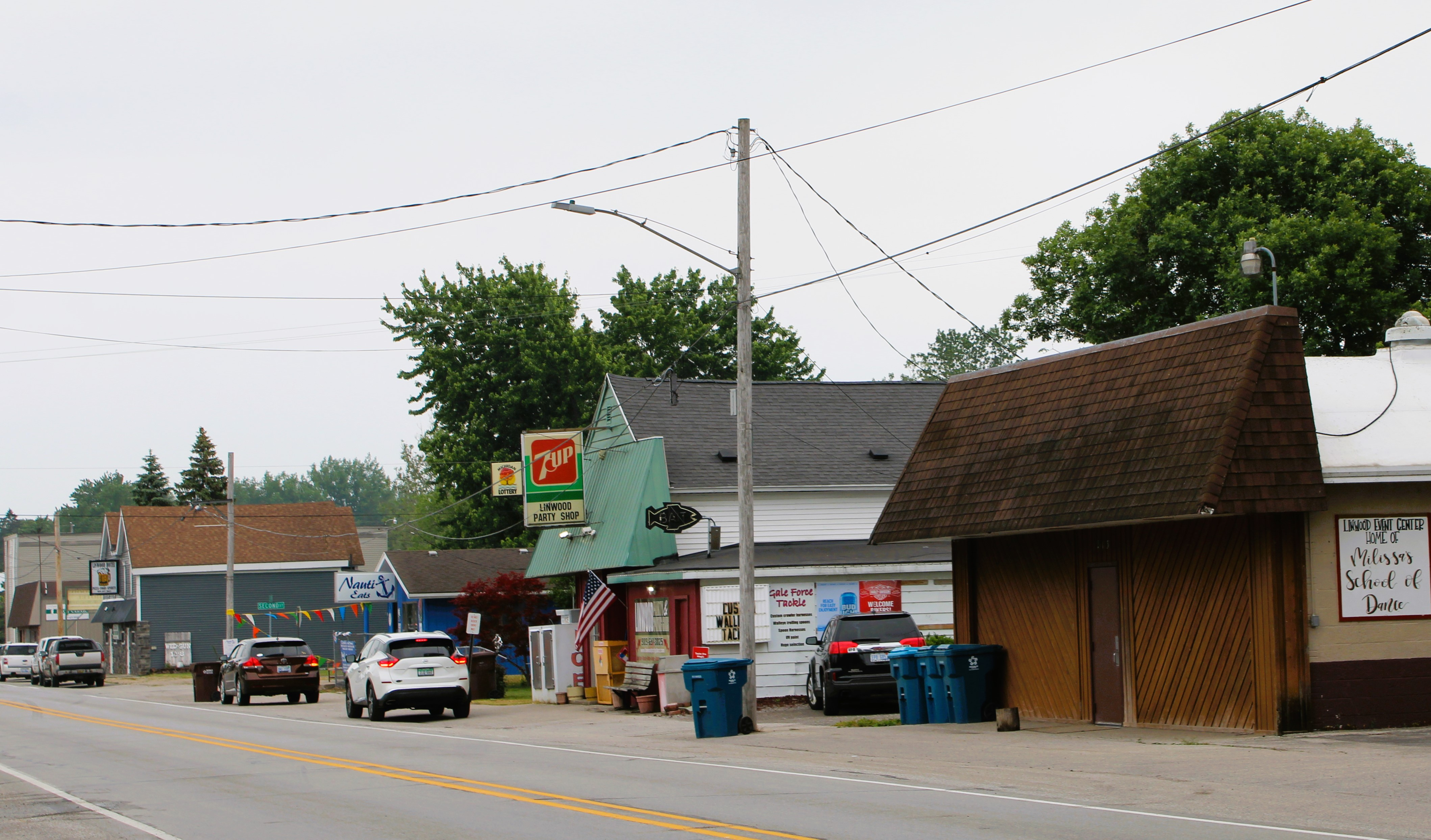

- Location within the state of Michigan Linwood (the United States)
- Coordinates: 43°44′21″N 83°57′44″W
- Country: United States
- State: Michigan
- County: Bay
- Townships: Fraser and Kawkawlin
- Settled: 1872
- Elevation: 584 ft (178 m)
- Time zone: UTC-5 (Eastern (EST))
  - Summer (DST): UTC-4 (EDT)
- ZIP code(s): 48634
- Area code: 989
- FIPS code: 26-47880
- GNIS feature ID: 630524

Linwood is a small unincorporated community in the northern portion of Bay County in the U.S. state of Michigan. The community is on the boundary between Fraser Township on the north and Kawkawlin Township on the south. It is situated with M-13 to the west and the Saginaw Bay of Lake Huron on the east, between Kaiser Tower Road and Elevator Road where Linwood Road becomes Center Street. Bay City is about 12 miles to the south and Linwood is included in the Bay City Metropolitan Statistical Area.

The waters off Linwood in the Saginaw Bay are known for their excellent perch and walleye fishing. Walleye can typically be found in abundant numbers from May through mid-July, and make Linwood a destination for fishermen during the summer months. The local bars, restaurants, marina and campground make the village a popular destination for vacationers and fishermen during the summer.

The Nayanquing Point State Wildlife Area is three miles to the north while the Tobico Marsh is three miles to the south. Both are popular places for bird observation and the Wildlife Area is popular with seasonal waterfowl hunters.

Every August, the Pickle Festival is held in Linwood.

Radio station WSAG-FM (104.1) is licensed to Linwood by the Federal Communications Commission, though its studios are in Saginaw.

== History ==
The settlement began as "Terry's Station", a depot on the Mackinaw division of the Michigan Central Railroad, named for James G. Terry, the head of a local lumber company. He was the first postmaster of a post office named "Terry Station", which opened on February 21, 1872. The office closed on February 16, 1874, but was reestablished on June 6, 1877. On June 28, 1882, the name was changed to Linwood, derived from a combination of the words "line" and "wood", since it was on the line between two different townships and it was also heavily wooded. The railroad station was renamed "Linwood Park".

== ZIP code area and demographics ==
The Linwood post office has ZIP code 48634 and serves the northern portions of Kawkawlin Township and Beaver Township and the southern portions of Fraser Township and Garfield Township. At the 2000 census, the population of the Zip Code Tabulation Area for 48634 was 4,684.
