= Jaxon Deur =

American politician

Member-elect of the Michigan House of Representatives from the 101st district
- Assuming office January 1, 2027
- Succeeding: Joseph Fox

Personal details
- Party: Republican
- Education: Western Michigan University
- Website: www.jaxondeur.com

Jaxon Deur is an American politician who is the member-elect for the 101st district of the Michigan House of Representatives. He was elected at the 2026 election. He is a pilot and agriculture consultant from Fremont, Michigan.
