= Jack O'Malley (Michigan politician) =

American politician

Member of the Michigan House of Representatives from the 101st district
- In office January 9, 2019 – December 31, 2022
- Preceded by: Curt VanderWall
- Succeeded by: Joseph Fox

Personal details
- Party: Republican
- Spouse: Robin
- Children: 3
- Education: Specs Howard School of Broadcast Media
- Occupation: Broadcaster, politician
- Website: votejackomalley.com

Jack O'Malley is an American politician. O'Malley was a Republican member of the Michigan House of Representatives from District 101 from 2019 to 2022.

== Education ==
O'Malley graduated from Specs Howard School of Broadcast Media.

== Career ==
O'Malley was a radio and television broadcaster for roughly 40 years. O'Malley hosted the WTCM FM morning show in 1984.

On November 6, 2018, O'Malley won the election and became a Republican member of the Michigan House of Representatives for District 101. O'Malley defeated Kathy Wiejaczka with 58% of the votes.

== Personal life ==
O'Malley's wife is Robin. She has a child from her first marriage. O’Malley has two adult children from his first marriage.

== See also ==
- 2018 Michigan House of Representatives election

Political offices
Preceded by Curt VanderWall	Michigan Representatives; 101st District; 2019–2023	Succeeded by Joseph Fox
