= Fraser Township, Michigan =

- Civil township
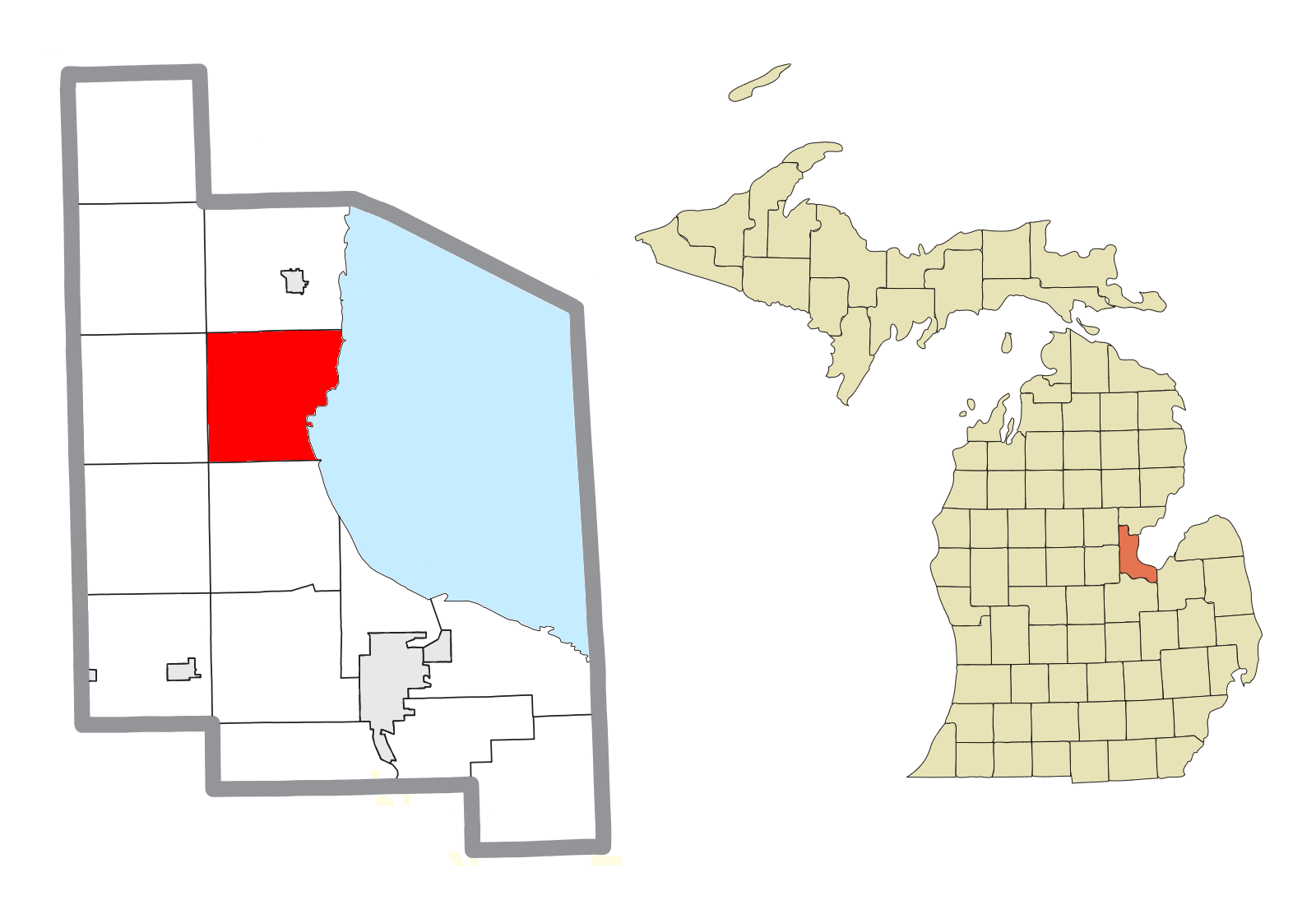
- Location within Bay County

- Location within the state of Michigan Fraser Township (the United States)
- Coordinates: 43°47′12″N 83°58′13″W
- Country: United States
- State: Michigan
- County: Bay
- Established: 1875

Government
  - Supervisor: Mark Galus
  - Clerk: Patricia Powers

Area
  - Total: 39.4 sq mi (102.0 km^{2})
  - Land: 32.4 sq mi (84.0 km^{2})
  - Water: 6.9 sq mi (18.0 km^{2})
- Elevation: 610 ft (186 m)

Population (2020)
  - Total: 2,994
  - Density: 92.3/sq mi (35.6/km^{2})
- Time zone: UTC-5 (Eastern (EST))
  - Summer (DST): UTC-4 (EDT)
- ZIP code(s): 48634 (Linwood); 48650 (Pinconning)
- Area code: 989
- FIPS code: 26-30400
- GNIS feature ID: 1626309
- Website: Official website

Fraser Township is a civil township of Bay County in the U.S. state of Michigan. The township's population was 2,994 as of the 2020 census. It is included in the Bay City Metropolitan Statistical Area.

== Communities ==
The township has a few unincorporated communities with its borders:

- Almeda Beach is on Almeda Beach Road near the Saginaw Bay shoreline. (Elevation: 584 ft./178 m.)
- Linwood is on the border with Kawkawlin Township.
- Meyers Beach is on Oak Road near the bay shoreline south of Newberg Road. (Elevation: 584 ft./178 m.)

== History ==
The Maxwell Post Office was opened on June 24, 1875, and lasted until September 6, 1880. This post office was reopened on December 20, 1880, with the name, Michie, on State Road near Coggins Road. On March 25, 1892, the Lengsville Post Office opened on Anderson Road near Elevator Road. The Tebo Post Office started operations on June 6, 1898, at Mackinaw Road and Neuman Road.

Two post offices ceased operations in 1904 Tebo on May 31 and Michie Post Office on October 15. Lengsville PO closed on March 31, 1911.

== Geography ==
Fraser Township is located on the western shore of Lake Huron's Saginaw Bay, north of the center of Bay County.

According to the United States Census Bureau, the township has a total area of 39.4 square miles (102.0 km^{2}), of which 32.4 square miles (84.0 km^{2}) is land and 6.9 square miles (18.0 km^{2}), or 17.68%, is water.

== Demographics ==
As of the census of 2000, there were 3,375 people, 1,292 households, and 1,003 families residing in the township. The population density was 104.4 inhabitants per square mile (40.3/km^{2}). There were 1,374 housing units at an average density of 42.5 per square mile (16.4/km^{2}). The racial makeup of the township was 97.78% White, 0.30% African American, 0.56% Native American, 0.36% Asian, 0.12% from other races, and 0.89% from two or more races. Hispanic or Latino of any race were 1.39% of the population.

There were 1,292 households, out of which 31.5% had children under the age of 18 living with them, 66.4% were married couples living together, 7.7% had a female householder with no husband present, and 22.3% were non-families. 19.3% of all households were made up of individuals, and 9.2% had someone living alone who was 65 years of age or older. The average household size was 2.61 and the average family size was 2.97.

In the township the population was spread out, with 23.9% under the age of 18, 8.1% from 18 to 24, 27.8% from 25 to 44, 28.3% from 45 to 64, and 11.9% who were 65 years of age or older. The median age was 39 years. For every 100 females, there were 100.2 males. For every 100 females age 18 and over, there were 97.9 males.

The median income for a household in the township was $41,581, and the median income for a family was $50,111. Males had a median income of $36,107 versus $24,570 for females. The per capita income for the township was $18,721. About 8.7% of families and 9.2% of the population were below the poverty line, including 10.2% of those under age 18 and 16.4% of those age 65 or over.
