= Ray Franz (politician) =

American politician

Ray A. Franz
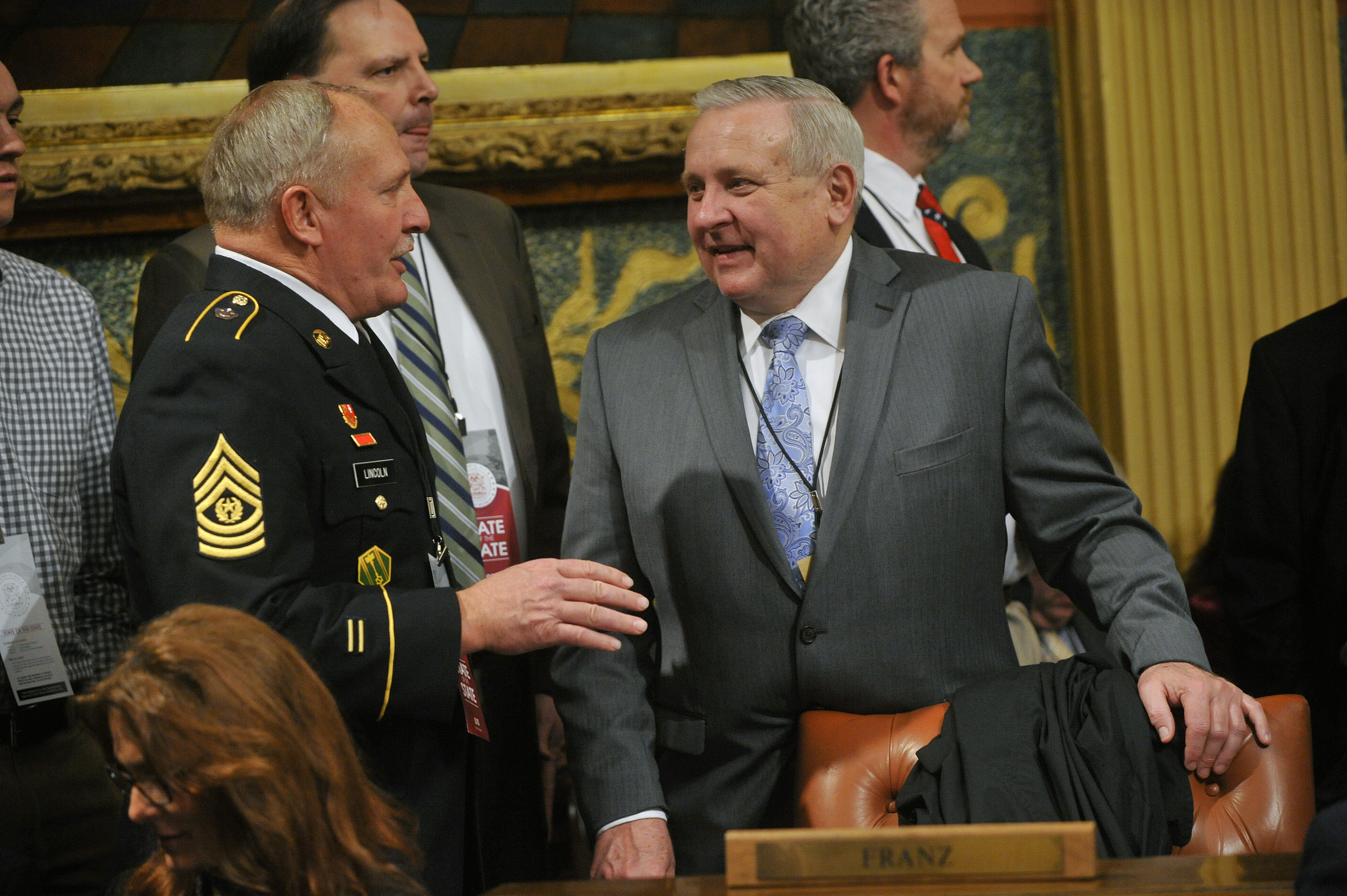
- Franz (right) at the 2014 Michigan State of the State address

Member of the Michigan House of Representatives from the 101st district
- In office January 1, 2011 – December 31, 2016
- Preceded by: Dan Scripps
- Succeeded by: Curt VanderWall

Personal details
- Born: Oakland County, Michigan
- Party: Republican
- Education: University of Detroit
- Occupation: Grocer

Military service
- Branch: United States Army
- Service years: 1968–1970
- Conflict: Vietnam War
- Awards: Bronze Star

Ray Franz is a former member of the Michigan House of Representatives first elected in November 2010 and re-elected in 2012. He was term-limited in 2016 and was succeeded by fellow Republican Curt VanderWall.

Franz was raised in Detroit, Michigan. He graduated from the University of Detroit and then served in the United States military in Vietnam. In 1978, he moved to Manistee County, Michigan where he was involved in running a grocery business. Franz also owned and operated Franz Market for 30 years, and served for three decades on the Onekama Village Council, including six years as village president.
