= Garfield Township, Bay County, Michigan =

Garfield Township, Michigan
- Civil township
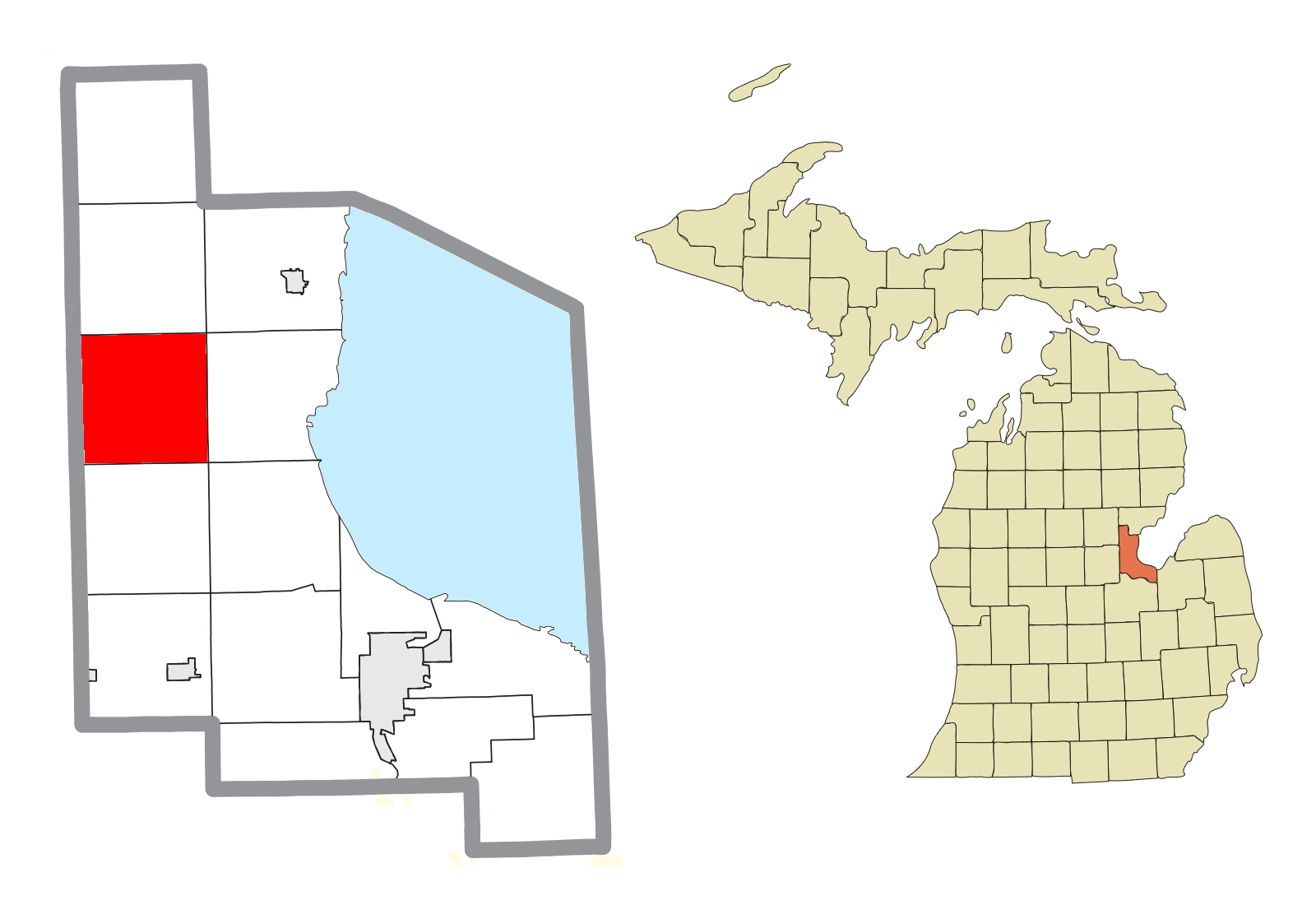
- Location within Bay County

- Location within the state of Michigan Garfield Township (the United States)
- Coordinates: 43°47′22″N 84°05′48″W
- Country: United States
- State: Michigan
- County: Bay
- Established: 1886

Area
  - Total: 35.69 sq mi (92.44 km^{2})
  - Land: 35.67 sq mi (92.38 km^{2})
  - Water: 0.023 sq mi (0.06 km^{2})
- Elevation: 643 ft (196 m)

Population (2020)
  - Total: 1,693
  - Density: 47.47/sq mi (18.33/km^{2})
- Time zone: UTC-5 (Eastern (EST))
  - Summer (DST): UTC-4 (EDT)
- ZIP code(s): 48634 (Linwood); 48650 (Pinconning); 48652 (Rhodes)
- Area code: 989
- FIPS code: 26-31540
- GNIS feature ID: 1626335
- Website: Official website

Garfield Township is a civil township of Bay County in the U.S. state of Michigan. The township's population was 1,693 as of the 2020 census. It is included in the Bay City Metropolitan Statistical Area.

== Communities ==
- Crump is a small unincorporated community within the township at Garfield Road and Anderson Road. 43°45′14″N 84°05′14″W

== History ==
The Crump post office opened August 30, 1898. On May 13, 1897, the Garfield post office opened at 8 Mile Road and Newberg Road. The Garfield post office ended operations on Apr 30, 1909. The Crump post office ceased operation on March 31, 1954.

== Geography ==
According to the United States Census Bureau, the township has a total area of 35.7 square miles (92.4 km^{2}), of which 0.023 square miles (0.06 km^{2}), or 0.06%, is water.

== Demographics ==
As of the census of 2000, there were 1,775 people, 604 households, and 495 families residing in the township. The population density was 49.8 inhabitants per square mile (19.2/km^{2}). There were 627 housing units at an average density of 17.6 per square mile (6.8/km^{2}). The racial makeup of the township was 97.46% White, 0.90% African American, 0.45% Native American, 0.11% Asian, and 1.07% from two or more races. Hispanic or Latino of any race were 1.35% of the population.

There were 604 households, out of which 36.8% had children under the age of 18 living with them, 69.7% were married couples living together, 8.8% had a female householder with no husband present, and 17.9% were non-families. 14.1% of all households were made up of individuals, and 5.3% had someone living alone who was 65 years of age or older. The average household size was 2.87 and the average family size was 3.14.

In the township the population was spread out, with 25.6% under the age of 18, 8.9% from 18 to 24, 28.0% from 25 to 44, 29.3% from 45 to 64, and 8.2% who were 65 years of age or older. The median age was 37 years. For every 100 females, there were 109.8 males. For every 100 females age 18 and over, there were 106.6 males.

The median income for a household in the township was $44,044, and the median income for a family was $49,559. Males had a median income of $36,250 versus $20,592 for females. The per capita income for the township was $17,306. About 7.4% of families and 10.5% of the population were below the poverty line, including 10.9% of those under age 18 and 11.8% of those age 65 or over.
