= Frankenlust Township, Michigan =

- Civil township
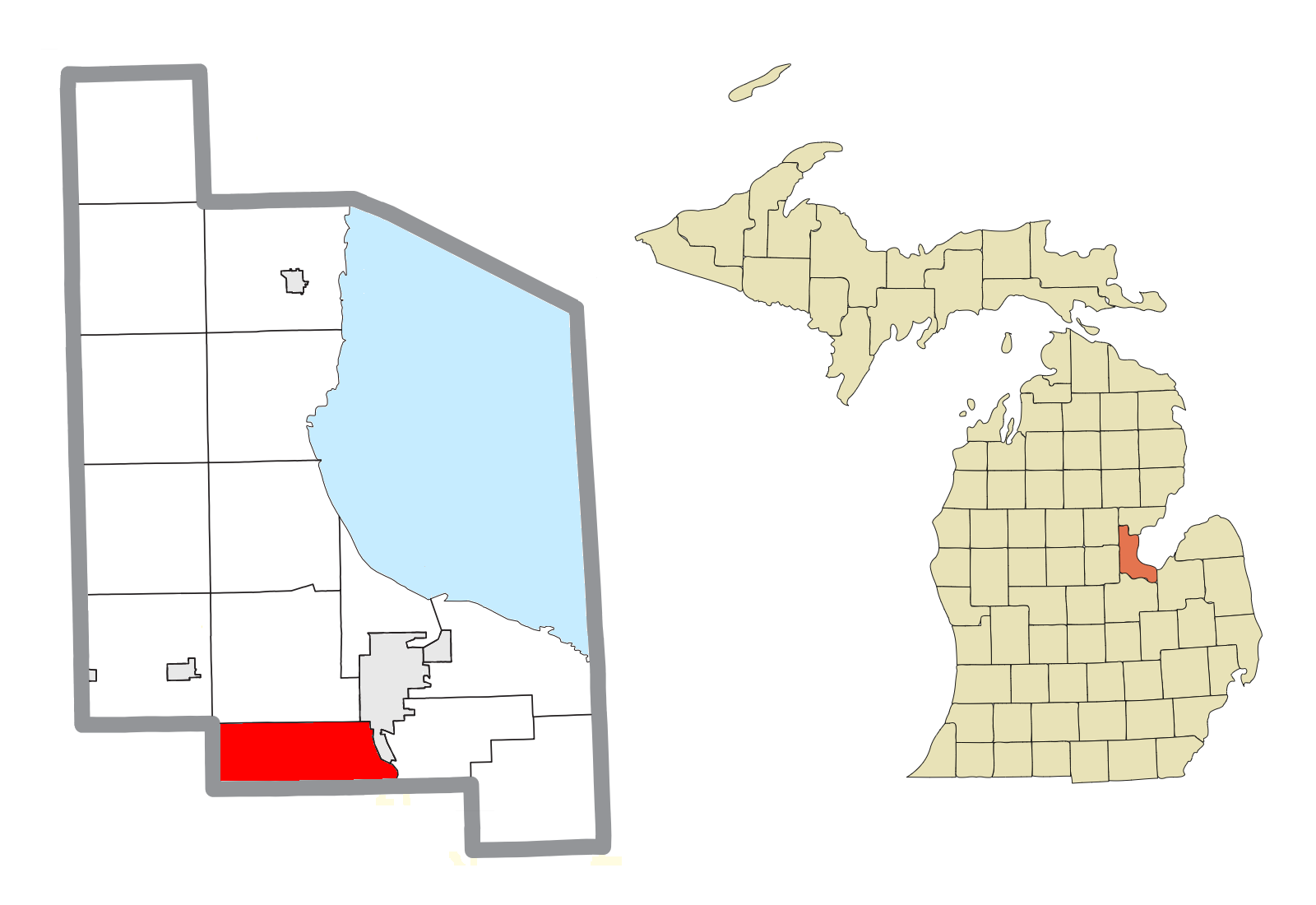
- Location within Bay County

- Location within the state of Michigan Frankenlust Township (the United States)
- Coordinates: 43°33′24″N 83°57′28″W
- Country: United States
- State: Michigan
- County: Bay
- Established: 1880

Government
  - Supervisor: Ronald Campbell
  - Clerk: Deborah Fisher

Area
  - Total: 23.1 sq mi (59.7 km^{2})
  - Land: 21.0 sq mi (54.5 km^{2})
  - Water: 2.0 sq mi (5.2 km^{2})
- Elevation: 597 ft (182 m)

Population (2020)
  - Total: 3,672
  - Density: 175/sq mi (67.4/km^{2})
- Time zone: UTC-5 (Eastern (EST))
  - Summer (DST): UTC-4 (EDT)
- ZIP code(s): 48604 (Saginaw); 48623 (Freeland); 48706 (Bay City); 48710 (University Center)
- Area code: 989
- FIPS code: 26-30180
- GNIS feature ID: 1626302
- Website: Official website

Frankenlust Township is a civil township of Bay County in the U.S. state of Michigan. The 2020 Census placed the population at 3,672. This is a 3.1% increase from the 3,562 recorded at the 2010 Census, the second largest increase in Bay County during that time period. The 2000 Census recorded 2,530. It is included in the Bay City Metropolitan Statistical Area. It is home to Delta College.

== Communities ==
The township has four unincorporated communities within its borders:

- Amelith is located at Mackinaw Road and Amelith Road.
- Brooks, formerly West Saginaw, is located at the intersection of the Huron and Eastern Railway and Hotchkiss Road and Euclid Avenue where the borders of the Frankenlust Township, Monitor Township and Bay City meet.
- Frankenlust is located at the intersection of three roads: Westside Saginaw Road, Delta Road and 3 Mile Road.
- University Center

== History ==
The township was founded by German Lutherans. The settlement of Frankenlust began in 1848. Frankenlust was granted a post office that opened on September 23, 1852. The settlement was part of Kochville Township when it was organized in 1856 and thus in Saginaw County. On January 12, 1870, a plat was filed for West Saginaw. In 1880 the county boundary was changed, and Frankenlust Township was organized in Bay County. The Frankenlust Post Office was closed on July 19, 1882, but was reopened on April 1, 1890. On December 15, 1892, the Frankenlust Post Office was closed again. On March 10, 1894, Amelith Post Office was opened at Kraenzlein Road and Kloha Road, but was closed on March 15, 1901.

== Geography ==
According to the United States Census Bureau, the township has a total area of 23.1 square miles (59.7 km^{2}), of which 21.0 square miles (54.5 km^{2}) is land and 2.0 square miles (5.2 km^{2}), or 8.63%, is water. It is bordered on the east by the Saginaw River. Interstate 75 passes through the eastern part of the township, with access at exit 160 with highway M-84 (Westside Saginaw Road). M-84 leads northeast to downtown Bay City and south to Saginaw.

Communities within Frankenlust Township:

Neighboring communities:

== Demographics ==
As of the census of 2000, there were 2,530 people, 1,053 households, and 751 families residing in the township. The population density was 111.0 inhabitants per square mile (42.9/km^{2}). There were 1,203 housing units at an average density of 52.8 per square mile (20.4/km^{2}). The racial makeup of the township was 95.69% White, 0.63% African American, 0.16% Native American, 2.02% Asian, 0.16% from other races, and 1.34% from two or more races. Hispanic or Latino of any race were 1.50% of the population.

There were 1,053 households, out of which 26.2% had children under the age of 18 living with them, 65.1% were married couples living together, 3.5% had a female householder with no husband present, and 28.6% were non-families. 25.2% of all households were made up of individuals, and 9.2% had someone living alone who was 65 years of age or older. The average household size was 2.40 and the average family size was 2.88.

In the township the population was spread out, with 21.6% under the age of 18, 5.8% from 18 to 24, 25.9% from 25 to 44, 30.3% from 45 to 64, and 16.4% who were 65 years of age or older. The median age was 43 years. For every 100 females, there were 101.6 males. For every 100 females age 18 and over, there were 101.2 males.

The median income for a household in the township was $52,161, and the median income for a family was $63,707. Males had a median income of $50,161 versus $32,167 for females. The per capita income for the township was $27,204. About 2.4% of families and 3.2% of the population were below the poverty line, including 2.4% of those under age 18 and 3.6% of those age 65 or over.
