= Beaver Township, Bay County, Michigan =

Beaver Township, Michigan
- Civil township
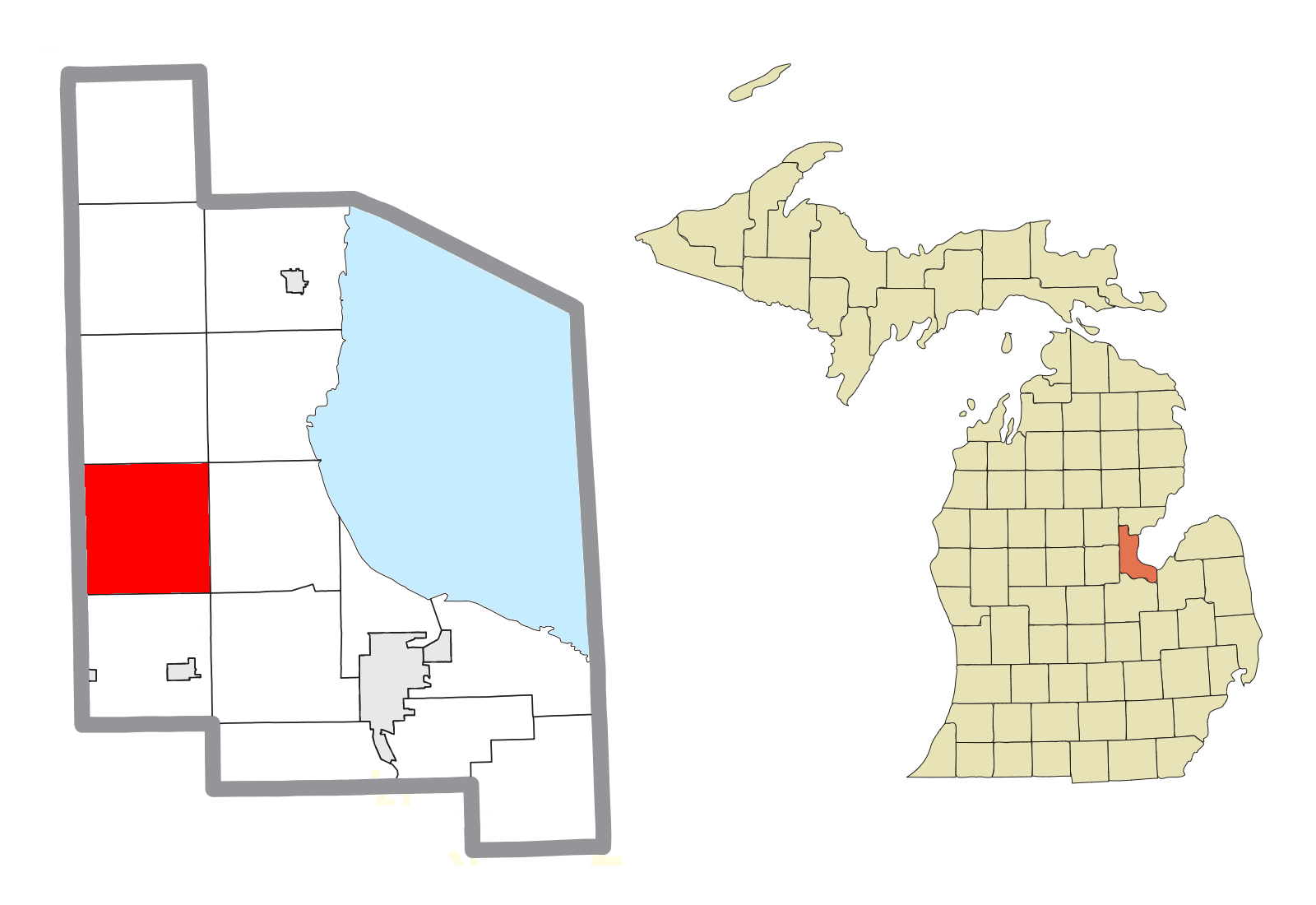
- Location within Bay County

- Location within the state of Michigan Bay Township (the United States)
- Coordinates: 43°41′57″N 84°05′51″W
- Country: United States
- State: Michigan
- County: Bay
- Established: 1867

Government
  - Supervisor: Steve Gray
  - Clerk: Mary McCarry

Area
  - Total: 35.36 sq mi (91.59 km^{2})
  - Land: 35.34 sq mi (91.53 km^{2})
  - Water: 0.019 sq mi (0.05 km^{2})
- Elevation: 610 ft (186 m)

Population (2020)
  - Total: 2,723
  - Density: 77.05/sq mi (29.75/km^{2})
- Time zone: UTC-5 (Eastern (EST))
  - Summer (DST): UTC-4 (EDT)
- ZIP code(s): 48611 (Auburn); 48631 (Kawkawlin); 48634 (Linwood); 48642 (Midland)
- Area code: 989
- FIPS code: 26-06540
- GNIS feature ID: 1625900
- Website: Official website

Beaver Township is a civil township of Bay County in the U.S. state of Michigan. The township's population was 2,723 as of the 2020 census. It is included in the Bay City Metropolitan Statistical Area.

== Communities ==
The township has five unincorporated communities located within its borders:

- Beaver is located at the intersection of 9 Mile Road and Parish Road at the corners of sections 11, 12, 13 and 14. It is at 43°42′42″N 84°04′04″W.
- Duel is located at the intersection of Parish Road and Flajole Road at the corners of sections 7, 8, 15 and 16. It is at 43°42′43″N 84°08′49″W.(Elevation: 640 ft./195 m.)
- Loehne, often misspelled as Loehme, is located on 9 Mile Road between River Road and Seidlers Road. (43°41′25″N 84°04′04″W (Elevation: 614 ft./187 m.) It was named for storekeeper Edwin Loehne who became the first postmaster of a rural post office on April 20, 1894. The office operated until July 20, 1904.
- Seidlers, also known as Seidler Corners, is located at Seidlers Road and Garfield Road. 43°40′58″N 84°05′16″W (Elevation: 610 ft./186 m.) It was founded in 1902 by Henry Seidler, who had a general store, blacksmith shop, and saloon. A school was added in 1905.
- Willard is located at the corners of sections 27, 28, 33 and 34, the intersection of 11 Mile Road and Beaver Road. It is at 43°40′06″N 84°06′30″W. (Elevation: 617 ft./188 m.)

== History ==
Beaver Township was organized March 13, 1867. Levi Willard, Josiah L. Wellington, and Oscar H. Kellogg were appointed to oversee the first township meeting to be held on the first Monday in April of that year. In 1873, Deep River Township was set off from Beaver Township. A post office name Willard was opened on February 26, 1885. On November 30, 1892, the Duel community received its post office. On April 20, 1894, the Loehne community had its post office open. On Dec 31, 1907, the Willard Post Office was closed down. The Loehne post office closed on July 30, 1904. On Mar 31, 1908, the Duel post office was closed.

== Geography ==
According to the United States Census Bureau, the township has a total area of 35.4 square miles (91.6 km^{2}), of which 0.019 square miles (0.05 km^{2}), or 0.06%, is water.

== Demographics ==
As of the census of 2000, there were 2,806 people, 968 households, and 787 families residing in the township. The population density was 79.3 inhabitants per square mile (30.6/km^{2}). There were 998 housing units at an average density of 28.2 per square mile (10.9/km^{2}). The racial makeup of the township was 98.82% White, 0.14% Native American, 0.18% Asian, 0.43% from other races, and 0.43% from two or more races. Hispanic or Latino of any race were 1.46% of the population.

There were 968 households, out of which 36.1% had children under the age of 18 living with them, 73.0% were married couples living together, 5.4% had a female householder with no husband present, and 18.6% were non-families. 15.1% of all households were made up of individuals, and 6.3% had someone living alone who was 65 years of age or older. The average household size was 2.86 and the average family size was 3.17.

In the township the population was spread out, with 25.4% under the age of 18, 8.6% from 18 to 24, 29.5% from 25 to 44, 24.9% from 45 to 64, and 11.4% who were 65 years of age or older. The median age was 38 years. For every 100 females, there were 98.3 males. For every 100 females age 18 and over, there were 99.8 males.

The median income for a household in the township was $51,546, and the median income for a family was $55,972. Males had a median income of $41,420 versus $27,303 for females. The per capita income for the township was $19,654. About 2.6% of families and 5.4% of the population were below the poverty line, including 3.6% of those under age 18 and 16.1% of those age 65 or over.
