= Portsmouth Township, Michigan =

- Charter township
- Portsmouth Charter Township
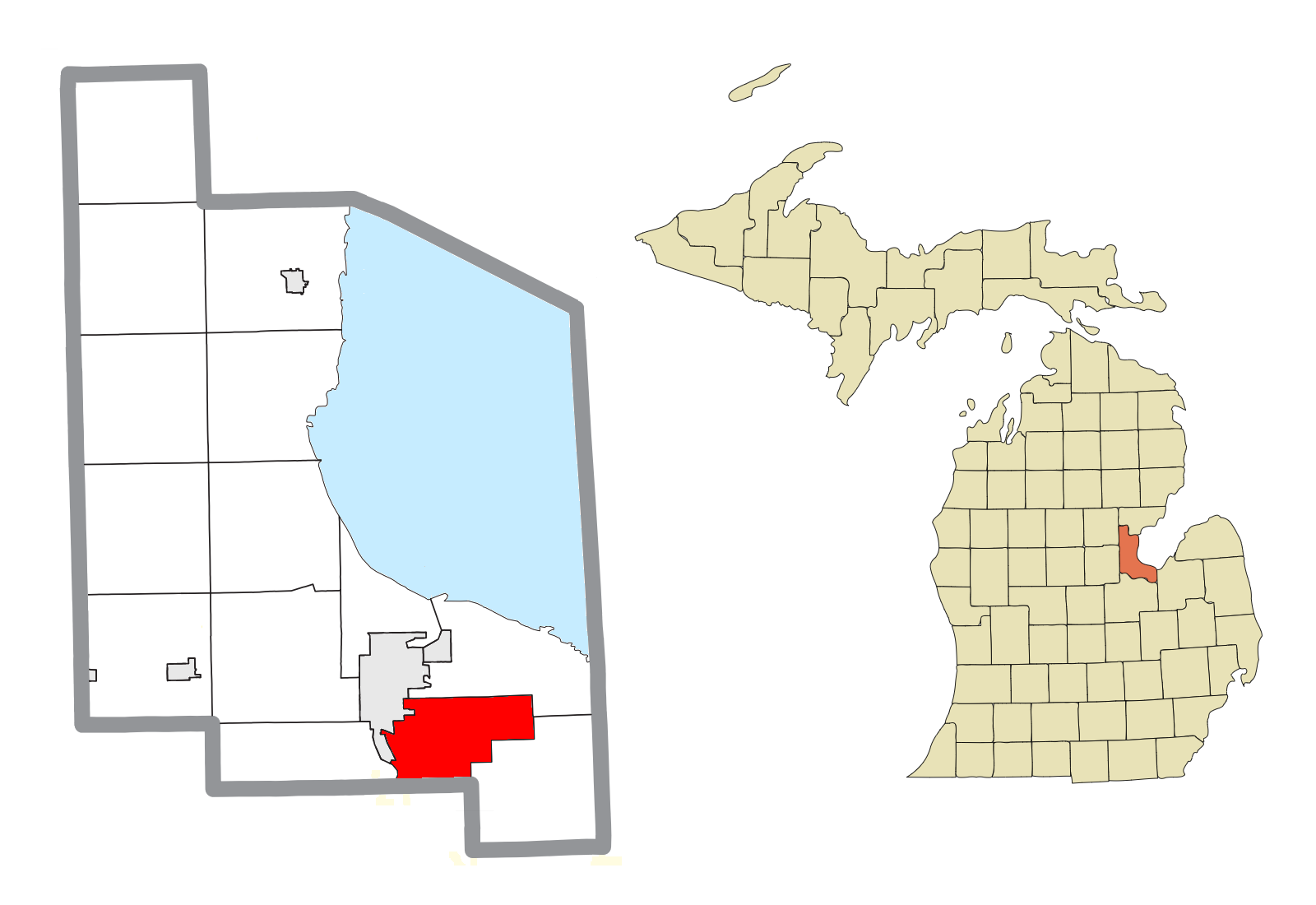
- Location within Bay County

- Location within the state of Michigan
- Coordinates: 43°33′21″N 83°51′03″W
- Country: United States
- State: Michigan
- County: Bay
- Established: 1859

Government
  - Supervisor: Robert Pawlak
  - Clerk: Judith Bukowski

Area
  - Total: 20.1 sq mi (52.1 km^{2})
  - Land: 20.0 sq mi (51.8 km^{2})
  - Water: 0.12 sq mi (0.3 km^{2})
- Elevation: 600 ft (183 m)

Population (2020)
  - Total: 3,224
  - Density: 161/sq mi (62.2/km^{2})
- Time zone: UTC-5 (Eastern (EST))
  - Summer (DST): UTC-4 (EDT)
- ZIP code(s): 48708 (Bay City); 48747 (Munger)
- Area code: 989
- FIPS code: 26-65980
- GNIS feature ID: 1626937
- Website: Official website

Portsmouth Charter Township is a charter township located in Bay County in the U.S. state of Michigan. The township's population was 3,224 as of the 2020 census and is included in the Bay City Metropolitan Statistical Area.

== History ==
Before the arrival of Euro-American emigres, there was a tree here that was said to mark the grave of Ke-wah-ke-won, a leader of the Ojibwe in former days.

== Geography ==
According to the United States Census Bureau, the township has a total area of 20.1 square miles (52 km^{2}), of which 20.0 square miles (52 km^{2}) is land and 0.1 square miles (0.26 km^{2}) (0.50%) is water.

== Demographics ==
As of the census of 2000, there were 3,619 people, 1,408 households, and 1,056 families residing in the township. The population density was 181.0 inhabitants per square mile (69.9/km^{2}). There were 1,484 housing units at an average density of 74.2 per square mile (28.6/km^{2}). The racial makeup of the township was 96.91% White, 0.75% African American, 0.41% Native American, 0.14% Asian, 0.91% from other races, and 0.88% from two or more races. Hispanic or Latino of any race were 3.45% of the population.

There were 1,408 households, out of which 29.8% had children under the age of 18 living with them, 62.9% were married couples living together, 8.5% had a female householder with no husband present, and 25.0% were non-families. 22.5% of all households were made up of individuals, and 9.7% had someone living alone who was 65 years of age or older. The average household size was 2.56 and the average family size was 2.99.

In the township the population was spread out, with 23.2% under the age of 18, 8.0% from 18 to 24, 26.2% from 25 to 44, 28.2% from 45 to 64, and 14.3% who were 65 years of age or older. The median age was 41 years. For every 100 females, there were 99.2 males. For every 100 females age 18 and over, there were 99.4 males.

The median income for a household in the township was $45,500, and the median income for a family was $50,938. Males had a median income of $42,000 versus $22,024 for females. The per capita income for the township was $19,337. About 5.4% of families and 8.2% of the population were below the poverty line, including 12.3% of those under age 18 and 8.2% of those age 65 or over.
