= Williams Township, Michigan =

- Charter township
- Williams Charter Township
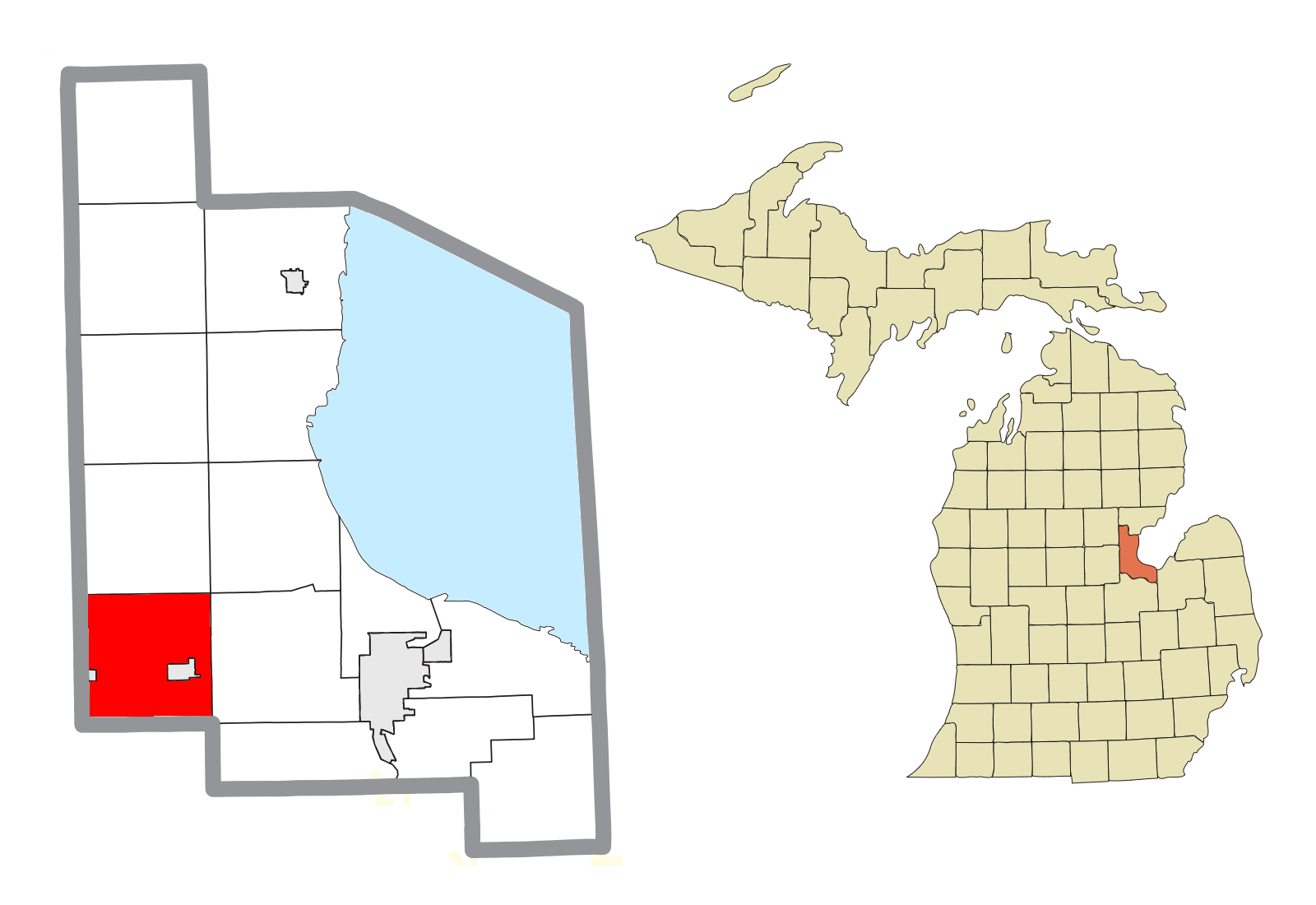
- Location within Bay County

- Location within the state of Michigan
- Coordinates: 43°36′34″N 84°07′07″W
- Country: United States
- State: Michigan
- County: Bay
- Established: 1858

Government
  - Supervisor: Will Butterfield
  - Clerk: Jerome Putt

Area
  - Total: 33.6 sq mi (87.0 km^{2})
  - Land: 33.6 sq mi (86.9 km^{2})
  - Water: 0.039 sq mi (0.1 km^{2})
- Elevation: 633 ft (193 m)

Population (2020)
  - Total: 5,058
  - Density: 134/sq mi (51.7/km^{2})
- Time zone: UTC-5 (Eastern (EST))
  - Summer (DST): UTC-4 (EDT)
- ZIP code(s): 48611 (Auburn); 48623 (Freeland); 48642 (Midland)
- Area code: 989
- FIPS code: 26-87380
- GNIS feature ID: 1627273
- Website: Official website

Williams Charter Township is a charter township of Bay County in the U.S. state of Michigan. The township's population was 5,058 as of the 2020 Census and is included in the Bay City Metropolitan Statistical Area.

== Communities ==
The township has two unincorporated communities:

- Fisherville is located at the intersection of 11 Mile Road and Midland Rd (43°36′15″N 84°06′32″W Elevation: 640 ft./195 m.)
- North Williams is located at the intersection of Garfield Road and Wheeler Road.(43°38′23″N 84°05′20″W

== History ==
The Willams Post Office opened August 26, 1868 in what is now North Williams and operated until April 10, 1874.

North Williams Post Office was opened on March 20, 1891 east of what is now North Williams at Garfield and Wheeler roads. On April 22, the Colden Post Office was opened at Rockwell Road and James Savage Road in what is now the US-10 and M-20 interchange on the border with Midland County.

The Laredo Post Office opened Aug 19, 1892 in what is now Fisherville. On January 15, 1898, the Laredo Post Office was closed until its February 8, 1899 reopening. The last day that the North Williams Post Office was open was May 15, 1903. On Apr 30, 1906, the Laredo PO was again closed. The Colden Post Office was discontinued on January 15, 1907.

== Geography ==
According to the United States Census Bureau, the township has a total area of 33.6 square miles (87 km^{2}), of which 33.5 square miles (87 km^{2}) is land and 0.04 square miles (0.10 km^{2}) (0.12%) is water.

== Demographics ==
Historical population
Census	Pop.	Note	%±
2000	4,492		—
2010	4,772		6.2%
2020	5,058		6.0%

As of the census of 2000, there were 4,492 people, 1,623 households, and 1,283 families residing in the township. The population density was 133.9 inhabitants per square mile (51.7/km^{2}). There were 1,703 housing units at an average density of 50.8 per square mile (19.6/km^{2}). The racial makeup of the township was 97.57% White, 0.22% African American, 0.33% Native American, 0.18% Asian, 0.02% Pacific Islander, 0.56% from other races, and 1.11% from two or more races. Hispanic or Latino of any race were 1.91% of the population.

There were 1,623 households, out of which 37.4% had children under the age of 18 living with them, 68.4% were married couples living together, 7.4% had a female householder with no husband present, and 20.9% were non-families. 17.9% of all households were made up of individuals, and 5.9% had someone living alone who was 65 years of age or older. The average household size was 2.75 and the average family size was 3.13.

In the township the population was spread out, with 27.4% under the age of 18, 7.1% from 18 to 24, 30.6% from 25 to 44, 23.5% from 45 to 64, and 11.2% who were 65 years of age or older. The median age was 37 years. For every 100 females, there were 103.7 males. For every 100 females age 18 and over, there were 101.4 males.

The median income for a household in the township was $54,766, and the median income for a family was $61,907. Males had a median income of $45,450 versus $30,365 for females. The per capita income for the township was $22,262. About 2.9% of families and 4.8% of the population were below the poverty line, including 7.7% of those under age 18 and 2.3% of those age 65 or over.
