= Monitor Township, Michigan =

- Charter township
- Charter Township of Monitor
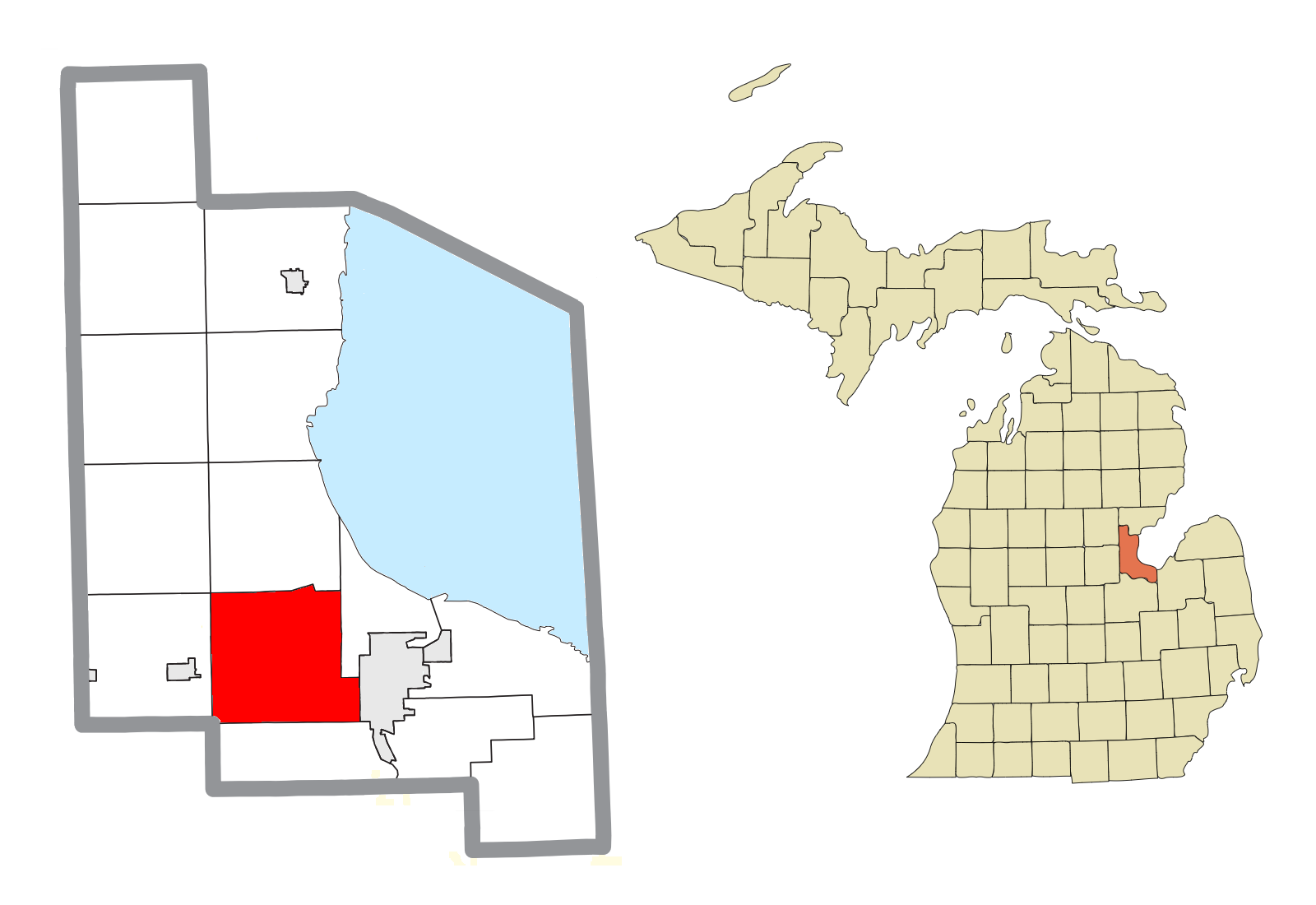
- Location within Bay County

- Location within the state of Michigan
- Coordinates: 43°37′01″N 83°57′42″W
- Country: United States
- State: Michigan
- County: Bay
- Established: 1869

Government
  - Supervisor: Terry M. Spencer
  - Clerk: Linda Ferguson

Area
  - Total: 37.0 sq mi (95.8 km^{2})
  - Land: 37.0 sq mi (95.8 km^{2})
  - Water: 0 sq mi (0.0 km^{2})
- Elevation: 600 ft (183 m)

Population (2020)
  - Total: 10,687
  - Density: 289/sq mi (112/km^{2})
- Time zone: UTC-5 (Eastern (EST))
  - Summer (DST): UTC-4 (EDT)
- ZIP code(s): 48611 (Auburn); 48631 (Kawkawlin); 48706 (Bay City)
- Area code: 989
- FIPS code: 26-54980
- GNIS feature ID: 1626753
- Website: Official website

Monitor Charter Township is a charter township of Bay County in the U.S. state of Michigan, organized in 1869. The township's population was 10,687 as of the 2020 census and is included in the Bay City Metropolitan Statistical Area.

== Communities ==
There are two unincorporated communities within the Township:

- Kawkawlin is located on M-13 on the south side of the Kawkawlin River just south of the border with Kawkawlin Township. (Elevation: 597/182 m.)
- Brooks is located at the intersection of the Huron and Eastern Railway and Hotchkiss Road and Euclid Avenue where the borders of the Township, Frankenlust Township and Bay City meet.

== History ==
The Kawkawlin Post Office opened on March 6, 1868 in Kawkawlin and has been in operation ever since.

On January 16, 1897, A post office, Colfax Post Office, opened in the township at Mackinaw Road and Salzburg Road. On May 15, 1900, the Colfax Post Office was closed down for the first time. The Post Office name Colfax was reopened on May 29, 1900 and lasting until May 15, 1901.

== Geography ==
According to the United States Census Bureau, the township has a total area of 37.0 square miles (96 km^{2}), of which 37.0 square miles (96 km^{2}) is land and 0.03% is water.

== Demographics ==
As of the census of 2000, there were 10,037 people, 3,975 households, and 2,949 families residing in the township. The population density was 271.3 inhabitants per square mile (104.7/km^{2}). There were 4,111 housing units at an average density of 111.1 per square mile (42.9/km^{2}). The racial makeup of the township was 97.83% White, 0.22% African American, 0.21% Native American, 0.37% Asian, 0.50% from other races, and 0.88% from two or more races. Hispanic or Latino of any race were 1.68% of the population.

There were 3,975 households, out of which 27.7% had children under the age of 18 living with them, 64.9% were married couples living together, 6.7% had a female householder with no husband present, and 25.8% were non-families. 22.9% of all households were made up of individuals, and 10.9% had someone living alone who was 65 years of age or older. The average household size was 2.47 and the average family size was 2.91.

In the township the population was spread out, with 21.3% under the age of 18, 6.8% from 18 to 24, 24.5% from 25 to 44, 28.0% from 45 to 64, and 19.2% who were 65 years of age or older. The median age was 43 years. For every 100 females, there were 91.4 males. For every 100 females age 18 and over, there were 88.1 males.

The median income for a household in the township was $50,106, and the median income for a family was $56,812. Males had a median income of $46,844 versus $25,951 for females. The per capita income for the township was $23,644. About 2.6% of families and 5.5% of the population were below the poverty line, including 4.1% of those under age 18 and 8.9% of those age 65 or over.
