= Kawkawlin Township, Michigan =

- Civil township
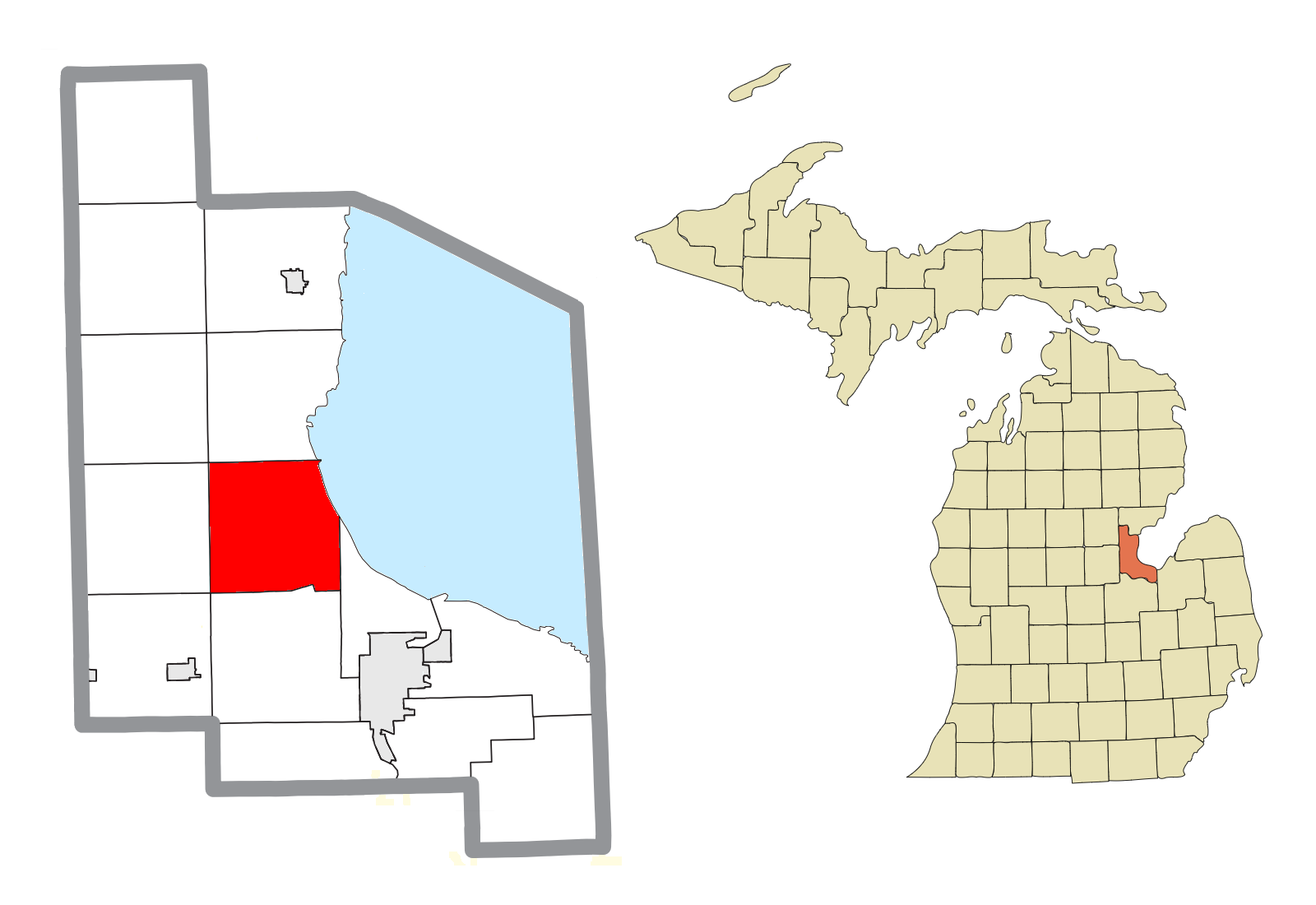
- Location within Bay County

- Location within the state of Michigan Kawkawlin Township (the United States)
- Coordinates: 43°41′58″N 83°58′42″W
- Country: United States
- State: Michigan
- County: Bay

Area
  - Total: 41.5 sq mi (107.4 km^{2})
  - Land: 32.4 sq mi (83.9 km^{2})
  - Water: 9.0 sq mi (23.4 km^{2})
- Elevation: 600 ft (183 m)

Population (2020)
  - Total: 4,419
  - Density: 136/sq mi (52.7/km^{2})
- Time zone: UTC-5 (Eastern (EST))
  - Summer (DST): UTC-4 (EDT)
- ZIP code(s): 48611 (Auburn); 48631 (Kawkawlin); 48634 (Linwood)
- Area code: 989
- FIPS code: 26-42360
- GNIS feature ID: 1626552
- Website: Official website

Kawkawlin Township is a civil township of Bay County in the U.S. state of Michigan. The township's population was 4,419 as of the 2020 census. It is included in the Bay City Metropolitan Statistical Area.

== Etymology ==
The name Kawkawlin comes from the Ojibwe word ogaakaaning, which means "place of pike (fish)" (referring to the Kawkawlin River, which was historically known for its abundance of pike).

== Communities ==
The township has four unincorporated communities within its borders:

- Brissette Beach is located on Brissette Beach Road between the Saginaw Bay shoreline and Tobico Marshes. (Elevation: 587 ft./179 m.)
- Linwood on the border with Fraser Township.
- Linwood Beach is at Cottage Grove Road and Linwood Beach Road and the Saginaw Bay shoreline. (Elevation: 584 ft. /178 m.)
- Three Churches Corner is off Interstate 75 at Fraser and Beaver roads. (Elevation: 607 ft./185 m.)

The community of Kawkawlin is not in Kawkawlin Township, but just south of the Kawkawlin River and the southern border of the township in Monitor Township.

== Geography ==
According to the United States Census Bureau, Kawkawlin Township has a total area of 41.5 square miles (107.4 km^{2}), of which 32.4 square miles (83.9 km^{2}) is land and 9.0 square miles (23.4 km^{2}), or 21.81%, is water.

== Demographics ==
Historical population
Census	Pop.	Note	%±
2000	5,104		—
2010	4,848		−5.0%
2020	4,419		−8.8%

As of the census of 2000, there were 5,104 people, 1,910 households, and 1,457 families residing in the township. The population density was 156.2 inhabitants per square mile (60.3/km^{2}). There were 2,021 housing units at an average density of 61.9 per square mile (23.9/km^{2}). The racial makeup of the township was 96.47% White, 0.47% African American, 0.57% Native American, 0.25% Asian, 0.61% from other races, and 1.63% from two or more races. Hispanic or Latino of any race were 2.29% of the population.

There were 1,910 households, out of which 32.5% had children under the age of 18 living with them, 63.6% were married couples living together, 8.2% had a female householder with no husband present, and 23.7% were non-families. 20.1% of all households were made up of individuals, and 8.0% had someone living alone who was 65 years of age or older. The average household size was 2.62 and the average family size was 3.01.

In the township the population was spread out, with 24.3% under the age of 18, 7.5% from 18 to 24, 27.6% from 25 to 44, 27.0% from 45 to 64, and 13.6% who were 65 years of age or older. The median age was 39 years. For every 100 females, there were 98.3 males. For every 100 females age 18 and over, there were 94.9 males.

The median income for a household in the township was $43,951, and the median income for a family was $49,750. Males had a median income of $40,401 versus $22,941 for females. The per capita income for the township was $20,648. About 3.8% of families and 4.9% of the population were below the poverty line, including 6.1% of those under age 18 and 5.8% of those age 65 or over.
