= Bangor Township, Bay County, Michigan =

Bangor Township, Michigan
- Charter township
- Charter Township of Bangor
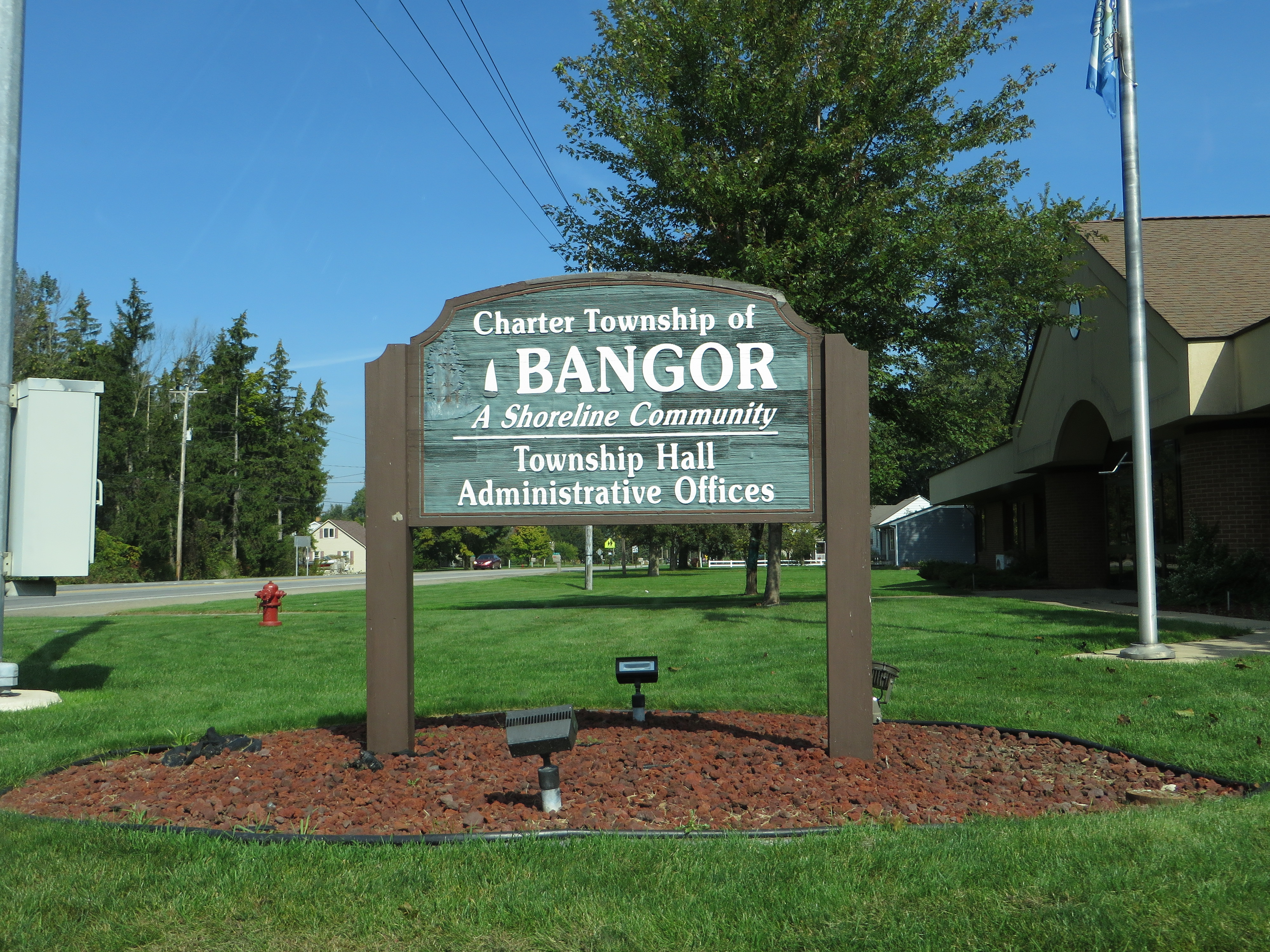
- Township Hall and Administrative Offices

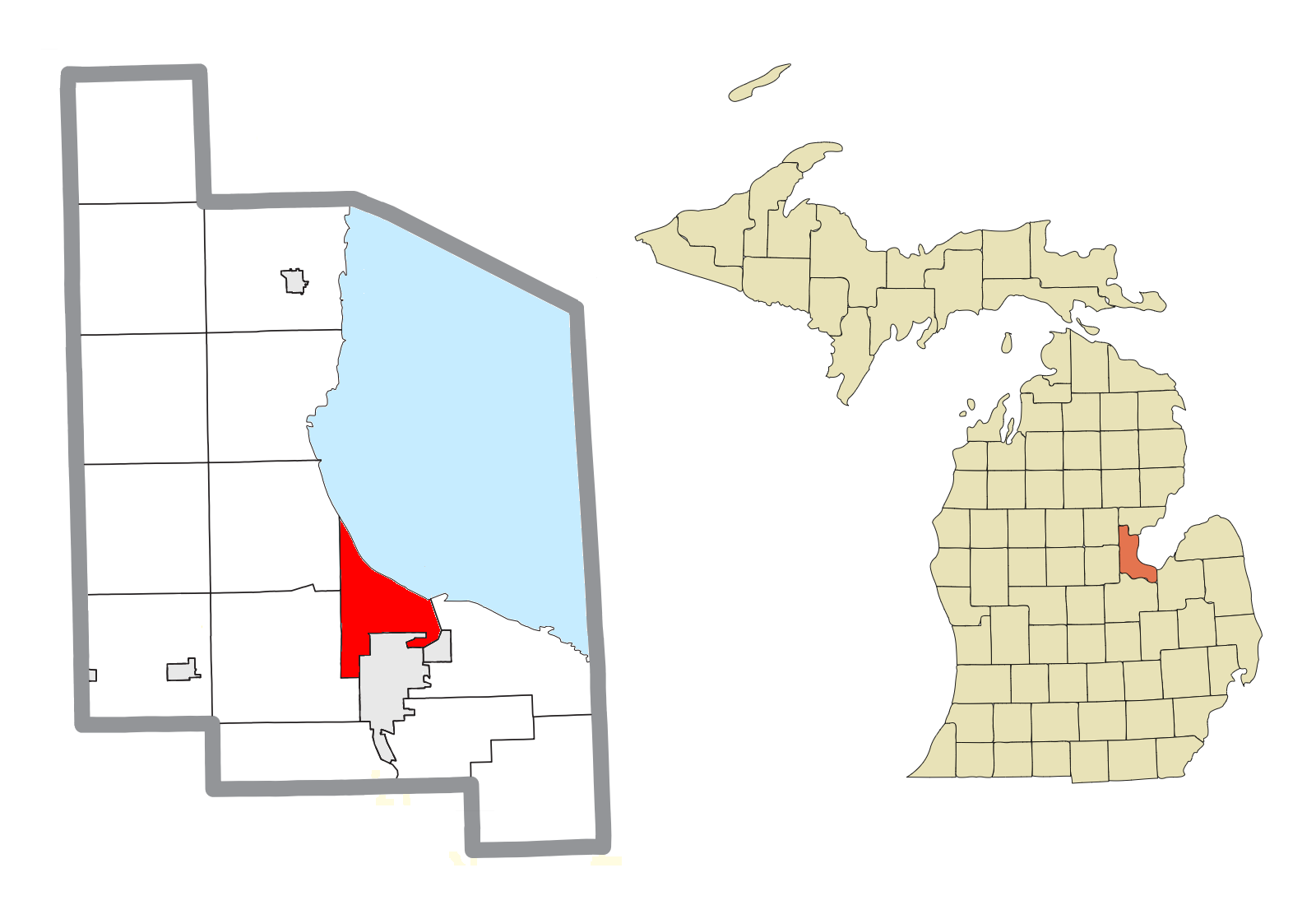
- Location within Bay County

- Location within the state of Michigan
- Coordinates: 43°38′08″N 83°54′20″W
- Country: United States
- State: Michigan
- County: Bay
- Established: 1859

Government
  - Supervisor: Glenn Rowley
  - Clerk: Dawn Bublitz

Area
  - Total: 21.9 sq mi (56.7 km^{2})
  - Land: 13.9 sq mi (36.0 km^{2})
  - Water: 8.0 sq mi (20.8 km^{2})
- Elevation: 584 ft (178 m)

Population (2020)
  - Total: 14,045
  - Density: 1,010/sq mi (390/km^{2})
- Time zone: UTC-5 (Eastern (EST))
  - Summer (DST): UTC-4 (EDT)
- ZIP code(s): 48706 (Bay City)
- Area code: 989
- FIPS code: 26-05120
- GNIS feature ID: 1625878
- Website: Official website

Bangor Charter Township is a charter township in Bay County in the U.S. state of Michigan. The township's population was 14,045 as of the 2020 Census and is included in the Bay City Metropolitan Statistical Area.

== Communities ==
The township contains five unincorporated communities:

- Aplin Beach, also known as Wenona Beach, is located at Patterson and Zimmer Roads near the Saginaw Bay shoreline. (Elevation: 584 ft./178 m.)
- Donahue Beach, also known as Bayside and Donoghue Beach, is located at Donahue Beach Road along the Bay shoreline near the mouth of the Kawkawlin River. (Elevation: 584 ft./178 m.)
- Killarney Beach is located between the Bay shoreline and Tobico Marshes on Killarney Beach Road. (Elevation: 577 ft. /176 m.)
- Lagoon Beach, also known as Lagoona Beach, is located along the Bay shoreline North of the mouth of the Kawkawlin River. (Elevation: 584 ft./178 m.)
- Little Killarney Beach is located between the Bay shoreline and Tobico Marshes on Killarney Beach Road. (Elevation: 584 ft./178 m.)
- Tobico Beach is located along the Bay shoreline on Euclid Avenue between Tobico Lagoon and Tobico Marshes. (Elevation: 584 ft./178 m.)

== History ==
Joseph Trombley in 1834 purchased Bangor township's section 16 from the government which was the beginning of the Bangor settlement. Bangor was platted in 1851 and was renamed Banks in 1864. In 1871, Banks became an incorporated village while Wenona was platted. In 1873, the Township consisted of about 10 sections. The community of Bangor in 1873 was served by the Banks Post Office which opened on May 18, 1864. The Banks Post Office was closed on May 1, 1866. On Nov 17, 1870, the Banks Post Office was reopened. By 1873, Wenona was served by a post office with the same name. The City of West Bay City, also known as West Bank City, was formed in 1877 by the state legislature consolidating the communities of Banks, Salzburg, and Wenona. Bay Side was a coal mining village in Bangor Township established in 1899.

== Geography ==
According to the United States Census Bureau, the township has a total area of 21.9 square miles (57 km^{2}), of which 13.9 square miles (36 km^{2}) is land and 8.0 square miles (21 km^{2}) (36.58%) is water.

== Demographics ==
Historical population
Census	Pop.	Note	%±
1990	16,028		—
2000	15,547		−3.0%
2010	14,641		−5.8%

As of the census of 2000, there were 15,547 people, 6,285 households, and 4,386 families residing in the township. The population density was 1,119.4 inhabitants per square mile (432.2/km^{2}). There were 6,563 housing units at an average density of 472.6 per square mile (182.5/km^{2}). The racial makeup of the township was 96.48% White, 0.62% African American, 0.44% Native American, 0.57% Asian, 0.02% Pacific Islander, 0.68% from other races, and 1.19% from two or more races. Hispanic or Latino of any race were 2.66% of the population.

There were 6,285 households, out of which 30.4% had children under the age of 18 living with them, 55.1% were married couples living together, 10.9% had a female householder with no husband present, and 30.2% were non-families. 26.1% of all households were made up of individuals, and 11.1% had someone living alone who was 65 years of age or older. The average household size was 2.44 and the average family size was 2.94.

In the township the population was spread out, with 23.7% under the age of 18, 7.7% from 18 to 24, 26.8% from 25 to 44, 27.1% from 45 to 64, and 14.7% who were 65 years of age or older. The median age was 40 years. For every 100 females, there were 93.0 males. For every 100 females age 18 and over, there were 89.5 males.

The median income for a household in the township was $42,358, and the median income for a family was $52,574. Males had a median income of $40,876 versus $24,776 for females. The per capita income for the township was $21,723. About 4.7% of families and 7.2% of the population were below the poverty line, including 7.8% of those under age 18 and 7.2% of those age 65 or over.

== Education ==
Bangor Township Schools operates area public schools, including John Glenn High School.
