= Bay County, Michigan =

County in Michigan, United States

- County
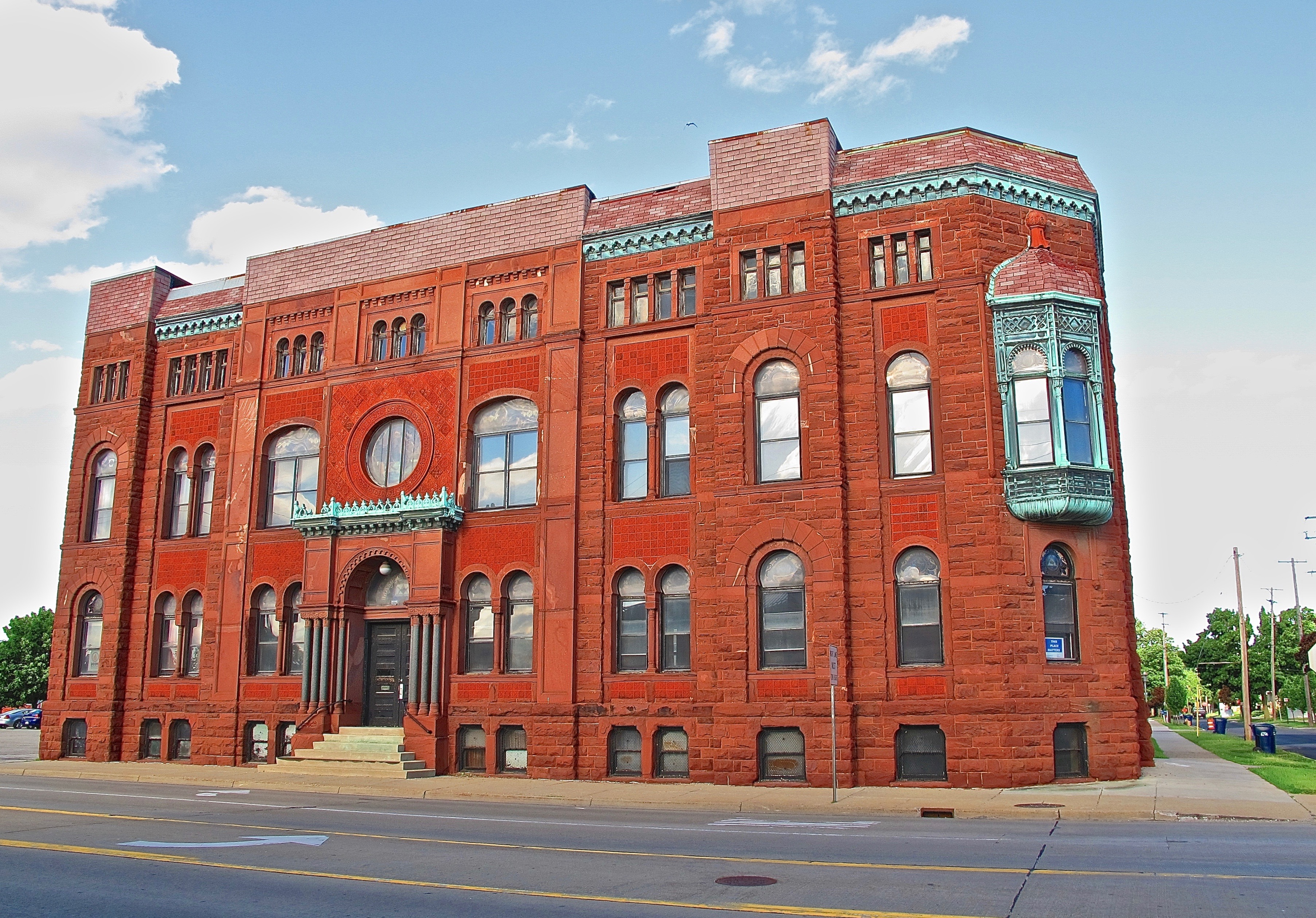
- Bay City Masonic Temple.

- Seal

- Location within the U.S. state of Michigan
- Coordinates: 43°43′N 83°56′W
- Country: United States
- State: Michigan
- Founded: February 17, 1857
- Named for: Saginaw Bay
- Seat: Bay City
- Largest city: Bay City

Area
  - Total: 631 sq mi (1,630 km^{2})
  - Land: 442 sq mi (1,140 km^{2})
  - Water: 188 sq mi (490 km^{2}) 30%

Population (2020)
  - Total: 103,856
  - Estimate (2025): 102,123 ▼
  - Density: 235/sq mi (90.7/km^{2})
- Time zone: UTC−5 (Eastern)
  - Summer (DST): UTC−4 (EDT)
- Congressional district: 8th
- Website: www.baycountymi.gov

Bay County is located in the U.S. state of Michigan. As of the 2020 Census, the population was 103,856. The county seat is Bay City. Bay County comprises the Bay City, MI Metropolitan Statistical Area and is included in the Saginaw-Midland-Bay City Combined Statistical Area in the Mid/Central Michigan region.

== History ==
=== 19th century ===
Bay County was created in 1857 from portions of Midland County, Saginaw County, and Arenac County. Its name references that it "surrounds Saginaw Bay." Being only sparsely populated at that time, Arenac County government was unorganized and was attached to Saginaw County for administrative purposes. There was considerable opposition to the creation of Bay County from elected officials in both Saginaw and Midland counties. In 1854, a bill introduced to the state legislature to create Bay County was defeated by a small majority.

In 1857, a new bill was introduced into the legislature. After initial opposition from the representatives of Saginaw and Midland counties, a compromise revision that would present the matter for ratification to the voters of "in said county" was passed by the legislature on February 17, 1857. The matter was put before all the voters of Saginaw and Midland counties and was soundly defeated. However, the population within the boundaries proposed for Bay County approved the measure. The bill passed by the legislature included phrasing, which was deliberately included by the Bay City lawyer Chester H. Freeman, that allowed Bay County to claim ratification. Under the act, the county was to become effective April 20, 1857.

Residents of Bay County held elections for county officials in June 1857. However, Saginaw County did not recognize the organization of the new county government. In the winter of 1858, Freeman secured passage of a bill in the legislature that would have confirmed the organization of Bay County. But the bill was vetoed by the governor. However, a case that went before the Michigan Supreme Court in its May 1858 term settled the matter. In the case, a defendant was tried in a Saginaw County court, but filed a plea for abatement, claiming that the supposed offense was committed in Bay County and was not in the jurisdiction of the Saginaw County court. Freeman had represented the defendant and prepared arguments, but became incapacitated due to illness. At the request of Freeman's wife, Colonel William M. Fenton argued the case before the Michigan Supreme Court, with the result that Bay County was declared a fully organized county.

=== 20th century ===
During World War II, shipyards in Bay County were used to produce US Destroyers and missile vessels.

In 1978, Bay County became the second Michigan county (after Oakland County) to adopt a County Executive form of government. Act 139 of 1973 provides for an optional unified form of county government under an appointed County Manager or an elected County Executive. With the County Executive, all departments of the county government that are not headed by a separate elected official (e.g. Treasurer, Clerk, Sheriff, etc.) are under the direction of the County Executive. The County Executive also has veto power over the motions and resolutions passed by the County Commission.

== Geography ==
According to the U.S. Census Bureau, the county has a total area of 631 square miles (1,630 km^{2}), of which 442 square miles (1,140 km^{2}) is land and 188 square miles (490 km^{2}) (30%) is water. It is the fifth-smallest county in Michigan by land area.

The Saginaw River flows through Bay City while the Kawkawlin River drains much of the central portion of the county. The Pinconning River and Saganing Creek drain the northern portion. The Saginaw Bay of Lake Huron lies to the east, giving the county its name.

=== Major highways ===
- I-75
- BS I-75
- US 10
- Bus. US 10 in Midland
- US 23
- M-13
- Conn. M-13
- M-15
- M-20
- M-25
- M-47
- M-61
- M-84
- M-138
- M-247

Interstate 75 (I-75) and U.S. Highway 23 (US 23), which are concurrent within the county, are the major north–south route. North of Bay City, M-13 follows a parallel route a few miles to the east. US 10 has its eastern terminus in Bay City. M-25, M-15, and M-84 enter Bay City from the east, southeast and southwest respectively and terminate in or near the city. M-20 and Business US 10 end at US 10 as they enter the county.

=== Adjacent counties ===
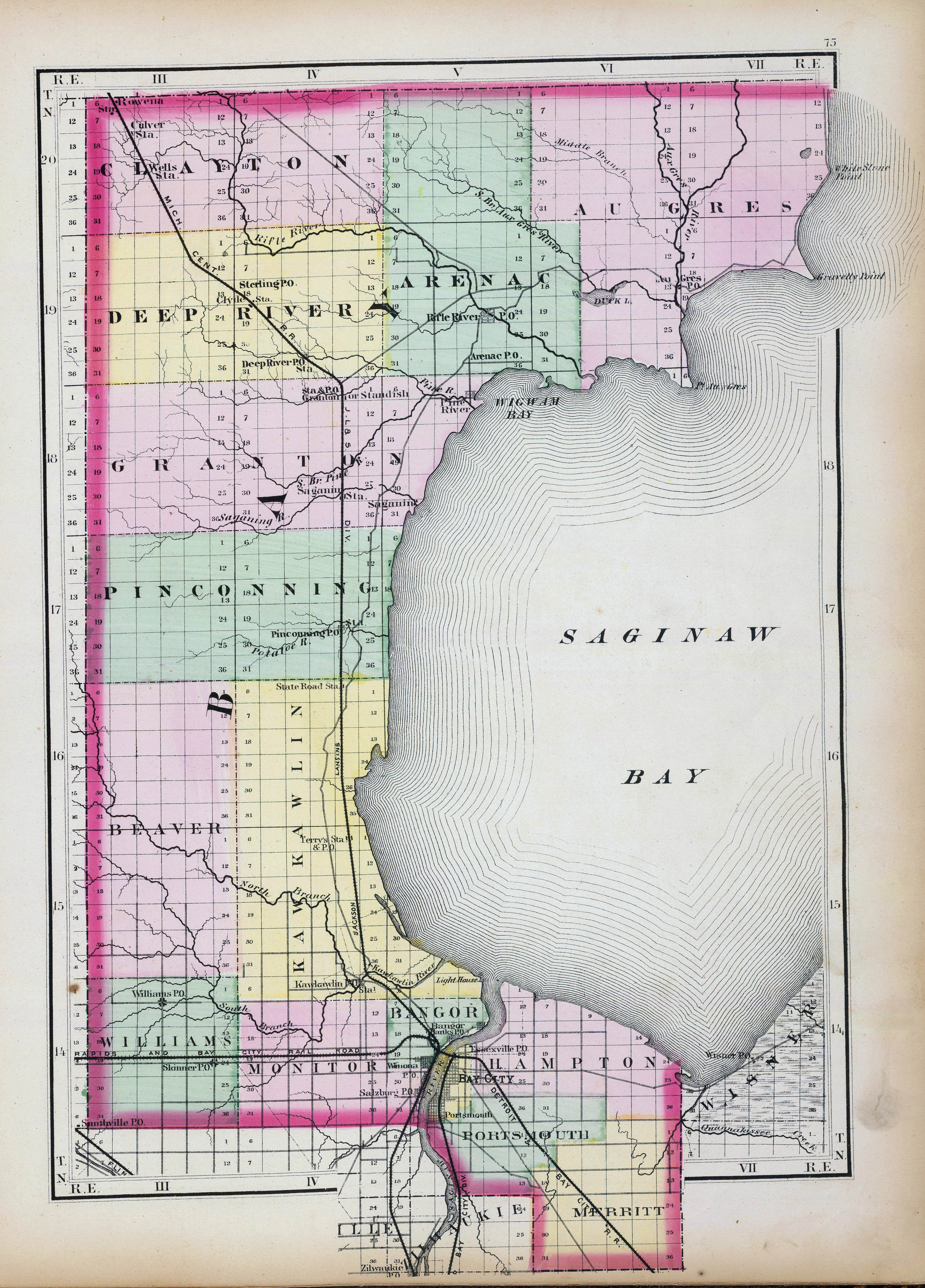
Bay County in 1873; a decade later Arenac County was organized from the northern townships seen in this map.

- Arenac County (north)
- Gladwin County (northwest)
- Tuscola County (southeast)
- Midland County (west)
- Saginaw County (south)

== Demographics ==
Historical population
Census	Pop.	Note	%±
1860	3,164		—
1870	15,900		402.5%
1880	38,081		139.5%
1890	56,412		48.1%
1900	62,378		10.6%
1910	68,238		9.4%
1920	69,548		1.9%
1930	69,474		−0.1%
1940	74,981		7.9%
1950	88,461		18.0%
1960	107,042		21.0%
1970	117,339		9.6%
1980	119,881		2.2%
1990	111,723		−6.8%
2000	110,157		−1.4%
2010	107,771		−2.2%
2020	103,856		−3.6%
2025 (est.)	102,123	▼	−1.7%
U.S. Decennial Census; 1790-1960 1900-1990; 1990-2000 2010-2018

=== Racial and ethnic composition ===
Bay County, Michigan – Racial and ethnic composition Note: the US Census treats Hispanic/Latino as an ethnic category. This table excludes Latinos from the racial categories and assigns them to a separate category. Hispanics/Latinos may be of any race.
Race / Ethnicity (NH = Non-Hispanic)	Pop 1980	Pop 1990	Pop 2000	Pop 2010	Pop 2020	% 1980	% 1990	% 2000	% 2010	% 2020
White alone (NH)	114,647	105,909	102,119	98,241	90,811	95.63%	94.80%	92.70%	91.16%	87.44%
Black or African American alone (NH)	1,011	1,228	1,343	1,574	1,598	0.84%	1.10%	1.22%	1.46%	1.54%
Native American or Alaska Native alone (NH)	604	647	512	476	359	0.50%	0.58%	0.46%	0.44%	0.35%
Asian alone (NH)	289	402	522	566	538	0.24%	0.36%	0.47%	0.53%	0.52%
Native Hawaiian or Pacific Islander alone (NH)	x	x	7	13	0	x	x	0.01%	0.01%	0.00%
Other race alone (NH)	168	43	55	43	257	0.14%	0.04%	0.05%	0.04%	0.25%
Mixed race or Multiracial (NH)	x	x	1,291	1,765	4,363	x	x	1.17%	1.64%	4.20%
Hispanic or Latino (any race)	3,162	3,494	4,308	5,093	5,930	2.64%	3.13%	3.91%	4.73%	5.71%
Total	119,881	111,723	110,157	107,771	103,856	100.00%	100.00%	100.00%	100.00%	100.00%

=== 2020 census ===
As of the 2020 census, the county had a population of 103,856. The median age was 44.2 years. 19.9% of residents were under the age of 18 and 21.2% of residents were 65 years of age or older. For every 100 females there were 96.8 males, and for every 100 females age 18 and over there were 94.2 males age 18 and over.

The racial makeup of the county was 89.8% White, 1.6% Black or African American, 0.4% American Indian and Alaska Native, 0.5% Asian, <0.1% Native Hawaiian and Pacific Islander, 1.3% from some other race, and 6.2% from two or more races. Hispanic or Latino residents of any race comprised 5.7% of the population.

71.1% of residents lived in urban areas, while 28.9% lived in rural areas.

There were 45,005 households in the county, of which 25.0% had children under the age of 18 living in them. Of all households, 44.3% were married-couple households, 19.9% were households with a male householder and no spouse or partner present, and 27.8% were households with a female householder and no spouse or partner present. About 32.0% of all households were made up of individuals and 14.4% had someone living alone who was 65 years of age or older.

There were 48,562 housing units, of which 7.3% were vacant. Among occupied housing units, 76.4% were owner-occupied and 23.6% were renter-occupied. The homeowner vacancy rate was 1.3% and the rental vacancy rate was 9.2%.

=== 2010 census ===
As of the 2010 United States census, Bay County had a population of 107,771. This is a decrease of -2,386 people from the 2000 United States census. Overall, the county had a -2.2% growth rate during this ten-year period. In 2010 there were 44,603 households and 29,116 families in the county. The population density was 243.7 per square mile (94.1 square kilometers). There were 48,220 housing units at an average density of 109.0 per square mile (42.1 square kilometers). The racial and ethnic makeup of the county was 91.2% White, 1.5% Black or African American, 0.4% Native American, 0.5% Asian, 4.7% Hispanic or Latino, 0.1% from other races, and 1.6% from two or more races.

There were 44,603 households, out of which 28.5% had children under the age of 18 living with them, 48.6% were husband and wife families, 11.8% had a female householder with no husband present, 34.7% were non-families, and 29.3% were made up of individuals. The average household size was 2.38 and the average family size was 2.92.

In the county, 22.2% of the population was under age of 18, 8.5% was from 18 to 24, 23.6% from 25 to 44, 29.5% from 45 to 64, and 16.2% was 65 years of age or older. The median age was 42 years. For every 100 females there were 95.9 males. For every 100 females age 18 and over, there were 93 males.

The 2010 American Community Survey 1-year estimate indicates the median income for a household in the county was $45,451 and the median income for a family was $52,784. Males had a median income of $31,035 versus $18,294 for females. The per capita income for the county was $22,378. About 11.2% of families and 16.2% of the population were below the poverty line, including 23.7% of those under the age 18 and 7.0% of those age 65 or over.

=== Religion ===
The Roman Catholic Diocese of Saginaw is the controlling regional body for the Catholic Church.

== Economy ==
According to Bay Future, Inc. the top employers in the county are:

Top Employers in Bay County, Michigan
#	Employer	# of Employees
1	McLaren - Bay Region	2,083
2	The Dow Chemical Company	1,160
3	Delta College	957
4	Michigan Sugar	900

== Government ==
From 1932 to 2012, Bay County voted for the Democratic Party candidate in every presidential election except for five national Republican landslides: 1952, 1956, 1972, 1980 and 1984. However, the county has turned increasingly Republican in recent elections. The November 2022 election resulted in the first majority Republican Board of Commissioners ever sitting in Bay County since the adoption of the Optional Unified Form of County Government (Act 139). However, Democrats have won every election for Bay County Executive since 1988. The current County Executive, James Barcia, defeated incumbent Thomas L. Hickner in the 2016 Democratic primary. He was re-elected in 2020 in a landslide and narrowly in 2024.

Bay County Executives
Name	Party	Term start	Term end
Gary Majeske	Republican	1979	1988
Kim Higgs	Democratic	1989	1992
Thomas L. Hickner	Democratic	1993	2016
James Barcia	Democratic	2017	Incumbent

United States presidential election results for Bay County, Michigan
Year	Republican		Democratic		Third party(ies)	
Year	No.	%	No.	%	No.	%
1884	2,916	35.15%	4,963	59.83%	416	5.02%
1888	4,378	43.73%	5,386	53.80%	248	2.48%
1892	4,587	42.96%	5,714	53.51%	377	3.53%
1896	6,037	48.09%	6,296	50.16%	220	1.75%
1900	6,462	54.60%	5,081	42.93%	293	2.48%
1904	7,609	68.25%	3,142	28.18%	397	3.56%
1908	6,760	58.22%	4,223	36.37%	628	5.41%
1912	2,625	23.43%	2,990	26.68%	5,590	49.89%
1916	6,708	51.09%	5,996	45.67%	426	3.24%
1920	13,933	64.93%	7,011	32.67%	516	2.40%
1924	14,861	64.75%	5,881	25.62%	2,209	9.62%
1928	12,467	56.88%	9,395	42.87%	55	0.25%
1932	9,816	39.12%	14,708	58.62%	568	2.26%
1936	8,729	35.08%	13,789	55.41%	2,367	9.51%
1940	14,618	49.41%	14,902	50.37%	67	0.23%
1944	15,459	49.54%	15,602	50.00%	143	0.46%
1948	13,321	47.58%	14,349	51.25%	327	1.17%
1952	20,087	58.40%	14,113	41.03%	196	0.57%
1956	23,519	60.39%	15,301	39.29%	128	0.33%
1960	20,909	47.51%	22,998	52.26%	104	0.24%
1964	11,896	28.52%	29,754	71.34%	56	0.13%
1968	18,779	44.12%	21,410	50.30%	2,378	5.59%
1972	23,094	50.08%	21,712	47.08%	1,312	2.84%
1976	23,174	46.64%	25,958	52.24%	557	1.12%
1980	25,331	46.40%	24,517	44.91%	4,744	8.69%
1984	26,198	53.43%	22,597	46.09%	235	0.48%
1988	20,710	42.13%	28,225	57.42%	217	0.44%
1992	16,383	30.14%	26,492	48.74%	11,480	21.12%
1996	16,038	32.33%	27,835	56.12%	5,730	11.55%
2000	22,150	42.90%	28,251	54.71%	1,235	2.39%
2004	25,448	44.60%	31,049	54.42%	562	0.98%
2008	23,795	41.32%	32,589	56.59%	1,204	2.09%
2012	24,911	46.49%	27,877	52.02%	798	1.49%
2016	28,328	53.17%	21,642	40.62%	3,304	6.20%
2020	33,125	54.90%	26,151	43.34%	1,057	1.75%
2024	34,792	56.72%	25,767	42.01%	779	1.27%

United States Senate election results for Bay County, Michigan1
Year	Republican		Democratic		Third party(ies)	
Year	No.	%	No.	%	No.	%
2024	32,145	53.44%	26,313	43.74%	1,693	2.81%

Michigan Gubernatorial election results for Bay County
Year	Republican		Democratic		Third party(ies)	
Year	No.	%	No.	%	No.	%
2022	23,448	47.65%	24,783	50.36%	978	1.99%

Bay County government is set up under Public Act 139 of 1973. This format provides for an elected County Executive who, as chief administrator, has influence over all departments, except those headed by other elected officials. In that manner, the County Executive appoints and supervises all department heads. It is the duty of the County Executive to coordinate all county activities and unify the management of county affairs, enforce all orders, rules and ordinances passed by the Board of Commissioners and all laws enacted by the state. In addition, the County Executive must submit to the Board of Commissioners a recommended budget each year. The county government operates the jail, maintains rural roads, operates the major local courts, keeps files of deeds and mortgages, maintains vital records, administers public health regulations, and participates with the state in the provision of welfare and other social services. The county Board of Commissioners controls the budget but has only limited authority to make laws or ordinances. Bay County has a Board of Road Commissioners, which consists of three commissioners who are elected and serve six-year staggered terms (one road commissioner elected every two years). The Board is the policy-making body of the Bay County Road Commission and is responsible for establishing budget priorities and managing the annual budget. In Michigan, most local government functions — police and fire, building and zoning, tax assessment, street maintenance, etc. — are the responsibility of individual cities and townships.

=== Elected officials ===
Office	Incumbent	Party
County Executive	James Barcia	Democratic
Prosecuting Attorney	Mike Kanuszewski	Republican
Sheriff	Troy R Cunnigham	Democratic
County Clerk	Kathleen Zanotti	Democratic
Register of Deeds	Brandon Krause	Democratic
Drain Commissioner	Michael Rivard	Republican

=== Road Commission ===
According to the Bay County Road Commission website, the Bay County Road Commission is a three-member body elected county-wide to staggered 6-year terms, with a single road commissioner elected every two years.

Next Election	Incumbent	Party
2024	William Schumacher Chairman	Republican
2026	William Jordan Vice Chairman	Democratic
2028	Kevin Shark	Republican

=== Board of Commissioners ===
7 members, elected from districts (six Republicans, one democrat)

District	Commissioner	Party
1	Kathy Niemiec	Republican
2	Tim Banaszak, Chairman	Republican
3	Vaughn J. Begick	Republican
4	Larry Beson	Republican
5	Christopher Rupp	Republican
6	Jesse Dockett	Democratic
7	Jerome Crete	Republican

== Communities ==
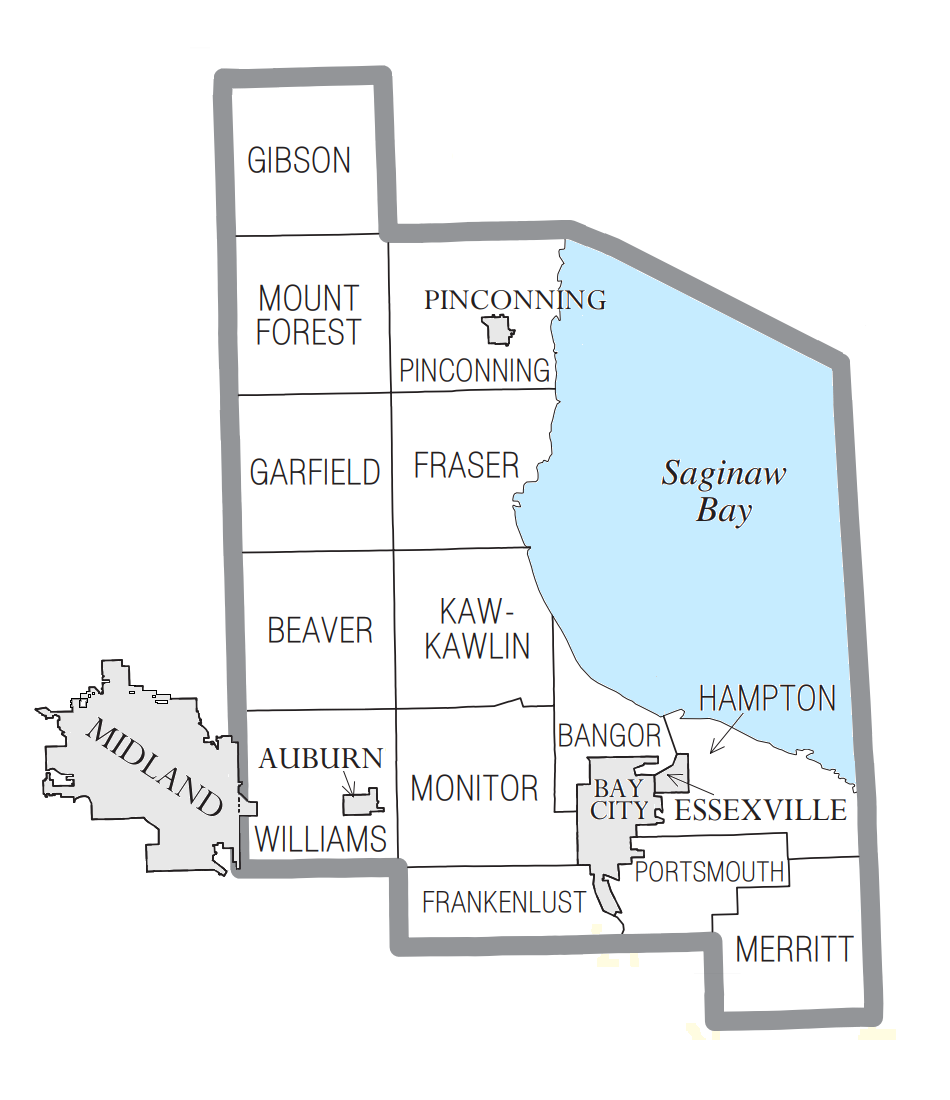
U.S. Census data map showing local municipal boundaries within Bay County. Shaded areas represent incorporated cities.

=== Cities ===
- Auburn
- Bay City (county seat)
- Essexville
- Pinconning
- Midland (partial)

=== Charter townships ===
- Bangor Charter Township
- Hampton Charter Township
- Monitor Charter Township
- Portsmouth Charter Township
- Williams Charter Township

=== Civil townships ===
- Beaver Township
- Frankenlust Township
- Fraser Township
- Garfield Township
- Gibson Township
- Kawkawlin Township
- Merritt Township
- Mount Forest Township
- Pinconning Township

=== Unincorporated communities ===
- Almeda Beach
- Amelith
- Aplin Beach
- Arn
- Beaver
- Bentley
- Brissette Beach
- Brooks
- Crump
- Donahue Beach
- Duel
- Fisherville
- Frankenlust
- Kawkawlin
- Killarney Beach
- Lagoon Beach
- Linwood
- Linwood Beach
- Little Killarney Beach
- Loehne
- Meyers Beach
- Mount Forest
- Munger
- Nine Mile
- North Williams
- Seidlers
- Three Churches Corner
- Tobico Beach
- Willard
- Woodville
- University Center

=== Former city ===
- West Bay City

== See also ==
- Bay County Library System
- List of Michigan State Historic Sites in Bay County
- National Register of Historic Places listings in Bay County, Michigan
