= Pinconning =

Pinconning may refer to

- Pinconning, Michigan
- Pinconning Township, Michigan
- Pinconning River
- Pinconning cheese
