= Saganing River =

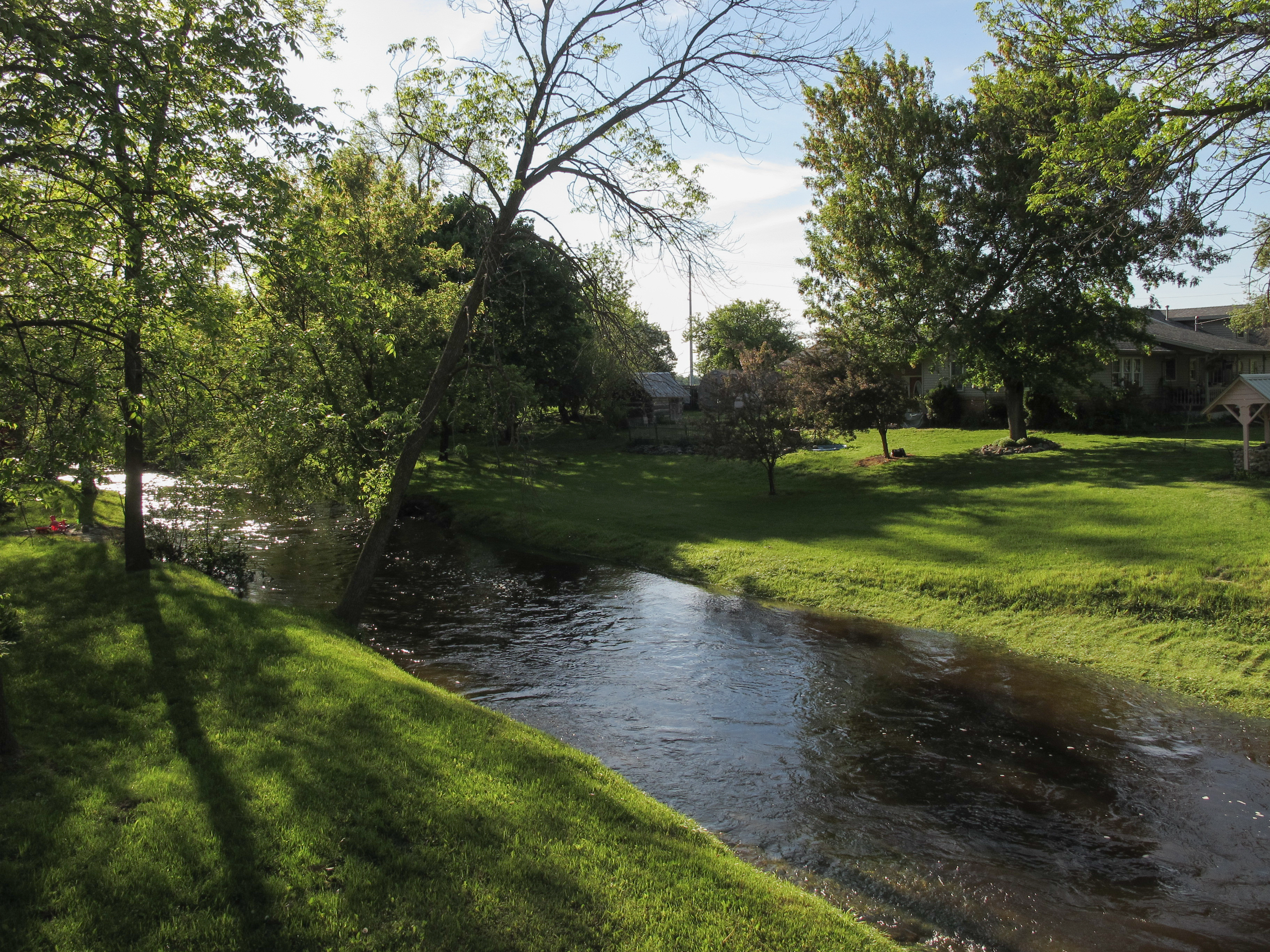
- The Saganing River in Standish Township

Location
- Country: United States

Physical characteristics
- Source
  - location: Arenac County, Michigan
- Mouth
  - location: Saginaw Bay, Lake Huron

Basin features
- Tributaries
  - left: Budd Drain
  - right: Saganing Creek, Saganing Drain

The Saganing River, also known as Saganing Creek, is a 10.0-mile-long (16.1 km) stream in the U.S. state of Michigan.

It rises from the confluence of Saganing Creek and Budd Drain in the northwest corner of Pinconning Township just south of the Arenac County/Bay County boundary at 43°54′30″N 84°01′39″W and flows in a gentle arc to the northeast through Lincoln Township and then bending to southeast in Standish Township before emptying into Saginaw Bay of Lake Huron just south of Whites Beach at 43°55′10″N 83°53′45″W.

Saganing Creek rises in the southeast corner on Grim Township in Gladwin County at 43°55′25″N 84°10′17″W and flows mostly eastward through Gibson Township and Mount Forest Township in Bay County. Its main tributary, Saganing Drain, rises in western Gibson Township south of Bentley and flows to the east-southeast.

The other main tributary of the Saganing River, Budd Creek, rises just east of Mount Forest at 43°53′16″N 84°06′13″W.
