= Pinconning Area Schools =

School district in Michigan, United States

Address
- 605 W. Fifth Street Pinconning, Bay County, Michigan, 48650; United States

District information
- Grades: PreKindergarten-12
- Superintendent: Andy Kowalczyk
- Schools: 4
- Budget: $16,783,000 2022-2023 expenditures
- NCES District ID: 2628170

Students and staff
- Students: 1,095 (2024-2025)
- Teachers: 60 (on an FTE basis) (2024-2025)
- Staff: 147.98 FTE (2024-2025)
- Student–teacher ratio: 18.25 (2024-2025)

Other information
- Website: www.pasd.org

Pinconning Area Schools is a public school district in Central Michigan. In Bay County, Michigan, it serves Pinconning, the townships of Fraser, Garfield, Mt. Forest, and parts of the townships of Beaver, Gibson, Kawkawlin, and Pinconning. In Gladwin County, it serves Bentley Township and part of Grim Township.

== History ==
Pinconning's former high school was built in 1904. A building program was begun in 1947 on the existing school campus. The middle/high school was built in 1954. Originally, it had five general classrooms, rooms for subjects such as science, homemaking and music, and a 1,500 seat gymnasium. When it opened in fall 1954, the former high school began housing grades kindergarten through third grade, and the existing elementary school began housing fourth through eighth grades.

Inadequate revenue resulted in service cuts in 1964, such as temporary half-day sessions for students in grades eight and below. The district was put on probationary status by its accrediting agency, the University of Michigan. However, a bond issue was approved late that year to fund the construction of 27 classrooms in the district. All were additions at existing schools, including nine at the high school. By 1966, the district's accreditation was restored and enrollment had grown to 2,700 students.

Garfield Fraser Elementary closed at the end of the 2002-2003 school year.

Mount Forest Elementary closed at the end of the 2009-2010 school year.

== Schools ==
Schools in Pinconning Area Schools district
School	Address	Notes
Pinconning High School	605 W Fifth St., Pinconning	Grades 9–12. Built 1954.
Pinconning Middle School	605 W Fifth St., Pinconning	Grades 6-8. Shares a building with Pinconning High School.
Linwood Elementary	517 W Center St., Pinconning	Grades PreK-5
Pinconning Central Elementary	609 W Fifth St.m Pinconning	Grades PreK-5
