= William S. Stavropoulos =

Greek-American businessman and philanthropist

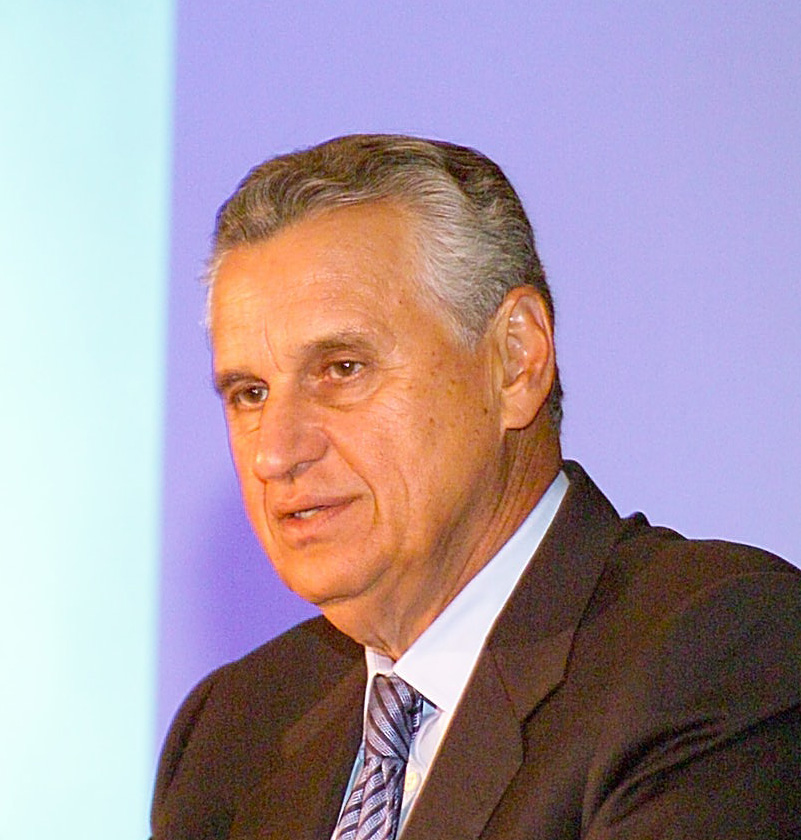
- Born: 12 May 1939 (age 87); Southampton, NY, United States
- Education: Fordham University (BS); University of Washington (PhD)
- Occupation: Chairman of Michigan Baseball Foundation
- Predecessor: Frank Popoff
- Successor: Andrew Liveris
- Spouse: Linda Stavropoulos
- Children: Bill and Angela Stavropoulos

William Spyros Stavropoulos (born 12 May 1939) is a Greek-American businessman and philanthropist. He is the past CEO and Chairman of The Dow Chemical Company, and the current CEO and Chairman of the Michigan Baseball Foundation.

== Early life and education ==
Stavropoulos was born in 1939 in Southampton, New York. The son of Greek immigrants, he grew up in the nearby town of Bridgehampton, where his family owned and operated a very popular ice cream parlor and eatery – The Bridgehampton Candy Kitchen. He attended Bridgehampton School, where he excelled both academically and athletically. One of the sixteen students in his high school graduating class was his close boyhood friend Carl Yastrzemski, a future Hall of Fame baseball star.

Stavropoulos received a B.S. degree in pharmacy from Fordham University in New York City in 1961 and a Ph.D. in medicinal chemistry in 1966 from University of Washington in Seattle, Washington.

== Career ==
In 1967 he joined the Dow Chemical Company as a researcher and was first assigned to Dow's pharmaceutical research labs in Indianapolis, Indiana. Stavropoulos, however, soon had the opportunity to become more involved in the business aspect of the company. He left the research lab and in 1973 became research manager of Dow's diagnostics products business. In 1977, he was promoted to business manager of Dow's polyolefins division, and over the next decade, he moved up the corporate ranks, assuming increasingly more responsible managerial and executive positions, including serving as president of Dow Latin America (1984-1985), and eventually rose to the position of president and chief operating office of Dow corporate in 1993.

At the start of the 1990s, Dow's executive leadership concluded that the company needed to undergo a radical transformation if it were to take advantage of the opportunities and face the challenges being created by the emergence of an integrated global economy. In 1995 Stavropoulos was tapped by Dow's Board of Directors to become the company's CEO, effective 1 November, and to lead the global makeover of the firm. As president of Dow USA since 1990, he had already been changing Dow's United States operations, and his performance was a prelude to the changes to the company he would implement worldwide.

== Transforming Dow Chemical Company ==
During Stavropoulos's tenure as CEO, Dow Chemical Company underwent a major transformation, the centerpiece of which was a total restructuring of the company. Dow’s division into largely autonomous geographic units was replaced by an organizational structure based on fifteen global businesses and ten global functional units. Hand in hand with this, Dow introduced a new performance review system that aimed to encourage accountability, and it greatly expanded its capacity in information technology ― most notably, a global company-wide intranet was established to which all employees were given access. As part of its transformation strategy, Dow divested itself of ventures that were no longer competitive or did not fit well with the company's strengths, e.g., its consumer products operation (DowBrands). At the same time, it invested $18 billion to acquire businesses. These acquisitions either expanded Dow's base in specialty chemicals and industrial biotech, or they positioned Dow in new geographies.

During Stavropoulos's tenure as CEO Dow's productivity improved, its stock price increased significantly, and the company became less dependent on the sale of commodity chemicals, which made it less subject to the cyclicality of the commodity chemical market.

As CEO, Stavropoulos led the effort to increase and publicize Dow's commitment to environmental protection and workplace safety. In 1995 the company pledged $1 billion to achieving ten-year environmental, health, and safety goals. A company-wide campaign engaged all employees in the campaign to reduce accidents, effluents, emissions, and use of energy and water.

In November 2000, Stavropoulos stepped down as Dow's CEO and became company chairman. However, at the end of 2002, he was asked by Dow's Board of Directors to return as CEO, a request he accepted. He then worked with Dow's executive leadership team to devise and implement a sequence of actions that put the company back on strong financial footing. At the end of 2004, Stavropoulos once again bowed out as head of Dow. He remained Chairman of the company until March 2006.

== Michigan Baseball Foundation ==
In 2005, Stavropoulos took the lead in bringing minor league baseball to Midland, Michigan, which is where Dow is headquartered. Together with the heads of several Midland foundations and companies, he established the Michigan Baseball Foundation (MBF)—a 501 (c) (3) non-profit organization. In December 2005, MBF purchased a minor league baseball team (the Devil Rays of Battle Creek, Michigan. In 2006, the founders of MBF established Michigan Baseball Operations—a taxable non-profit—to which they transferred ownership of the ball club. The Devil Rays became the Great Lakes Loons of Midland, Michigan in 2007.

From 2006 to 2007, MBF built a baseball stadium in downtown Midland (the Dow Diamond), which serves as the home field of the Great Lakes Loons. Both MBF and MBO operate as 'social enterprises' that invest their earnings back into the community, in the form of donations to non-profits, as seed money for ventures that improve the community, or to catalyze local entrepreneurship. Stavropoulos serves as chairman of both entities.

== Philanthropy ==
Together with his wife Linda, Stavropoulos established the Bill and Linda Stavropoulos Family Foundation, which donates to educational, religious, civic, recreational, and cultural non-profits. Linda serves as president of the Foundation.

William Stavropoulos has served on University of Notre Dame’s College of Science Advisory Council since 1988.

In 2016, the Bill and Linda Stavropoulos Family Foundation funded the establishment of The Stavropoulos Center for Interdisciplinary Biophysics at Notre Dame.

== Personal life ==
Stavropoulos married Linda Theofel in 1967. Together they currently maintain residences in Midland, Michigan and Naples, Florida. The couple have two children, Bill and Angela, and six grandchildren, Nina, Samantha, Lily, Kristina, Billy, and Joseph.
