= WLUN =

Radio station in Pinconning, Michigan

- Pinconning, Michigan; United States
- Broadcast area: Bay City-Midland-Saginaw
- Frequency: 100.9 MHz
- Branding: 100.9 The Mitt

Programming
- Format: Sports
- Affiliations: Fox Sports Radio; Detroit Pistons; Great Lakes Loons

Ownership
- Owner: Michigan Baseball Foundation; (Michigan Radio Communications, LLC)

History
- First air date: November 1983 (as WFXZ)
- Former call signs: WYLZ (1999–2008); WMJK (1995-99); WBTZ (1992-95); WMJT (1990-92); WLFS (1987-90); WWRM (1984-87); WFXZ (1983-84)
- Call sign meaning: "Loon" (in reference to "Great Lakes Loons")

Technical information
- Licensing authority: FCC
- Facility ID: 52616
- Class: A
- ERP: 2,600 watts
- HAAT: 151 meters
- Transmitter coordinates: 43°50′44.7″N 84°05′32.3″W

Links
- Public license information: Public file; LMS
- Webcast: Listen Live
- Website: 1009themitt.com

WLUN (100.9 FM) is a commercial radio station licensed to Pinconning, Michigan. The station broadcasts a Sports radio format. It is owned by the Michigan Baseball Foundation, owner of the Great Lakes Loons, with studios at Dow Diamond in Midland, Michigan.

WLUN is powered at 2800 watts and broadcasts from an antenna in Mount Forest Township near Pinconning. Its signal reaches the Saginaw, Midland, and Bay City metropolitan area and other surrounding cities. Programming comes from Fox Sports Radio, the station was previously an affiliate of ESPN Radio.

== History ==
WLUN has broadcast a variety of different formats since it first took the air on November 15, 1983. Formats included country music, adult contemporary, and classic hits. For much of its early history, it was the co-owned sister of WXOX (now WJMK), originally licensed to Essexville, but over time marketed itself as a Bay City station.

=== Beginnings in the 1980s ===
The station was originally signed on by Wegerly Broadcasting Corporation, headed by Robert Naismith, who also served as station general manager. However, the construction permit for the station was first issued in 1982 to Wigwam Bay Broadcasting, who chose the call letters WHFU. The permit would later be sold and the call letters changed prior to sign-on.

The station is fondly remembered by some in the Tri-Cities market for its time as Top 40/album rock station WFXZ, "Foxy 101," in the early 1980s. The station then changed format to easy listening in 1984, changing its call letters to WWRM, marketing itself as "Warm 101", taking the call letters and format from another station in Gaylord which had abandoned the format and call letters that year in favor of a Top 40 format.

Three years after this format was adopted, the station went through its first ownership change, separating itself from the AM station. The new licensee, BC Communications, acquired the station on May 20, 1987 for $345,000. The company was owned by Floyd Biernat and Milton Carles.

BC Communications then changed the station's call letters to WLFS, shifted its music focus to soft adult contemporary and marketed itself as "Sunny 101", targeting the Saginaw-Bay City market. However, the station ran into financial troubles by the end of the decade and fell silent.

=== Return and Rebirth ===
WLFS remained silent for a period of about two years. It was acquired on March 11, 1991 by P & G Media Corporation for $55,000. Much of the next year was spent getting the station back on the air, as much of the station's property had been liquidated through bankruptcy proceedings. The station returned in 1992 under the new call sign WBTZ, and boasting an album rock format, originating from its new FM sister station, WUVE-FM in Saginaw. Unlike the television market, Saginaw and Bay City were separate radio markets and were allowed under the more restrictive FCC ownership limits at the time (though they would be relaxed within a year). Station business was conducted out of WUVE's facilities on Gordonville Road in Midland.

In 1994, the station changed ownership to WMJK-FM LLC, in a transaction for $222,750. With the change came the change of the station's call letters to mirror that of its new licensee. Concurrently, the station began rebroadcasting a new sister FM station in Saginaw, WMJA, which had signed on in 1992. Both stations, branded as "Magic 101 and 104", then switched to a 70's based format blend of classic rock and oldies.

As WYLZ, 100.9 FM and its former sister station, WILZ, were known together as "Wheelz 104.5 and 101" from 1999 to 2007.

In June 2007, WYLZ was sold by Citadel Broadcasting (along with ten other stations) to The Last Bastion Station Trust, as part of ABC Radio's absorption into Citadel. Upon ending the simulcast, WYLZ switched to a satellite-fed country format ("Mainstream Country" from Dial Global) under the "Thunder Country" moniker. Despite the programming changes, WYLZ continued to air play-by-play of Great Lakes Loons baseball during the summer of 2007. The satellite country format was a stopgap measure to keep the station on the air until it could be sold to a new owner and debut a permanent format. WILZ 104.5 maintains its classic rock format and Cumulus ownership.

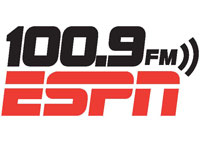
Former logo as an ESPN Affiliate.

=== Switch to ESPN Radio ===
On March 24, 2008, WYLZ announced it would change formats to all sports radio, with programming from ESPN Radio, under a new moniker, "ESPN 100.9," effective March 25. The Michigan Baseball Foundation acquired the station from Last Bastion, with FCC approval. (ESPN 100.9-FM to launch in Bay City/Midland (Michiguide.com: Michigan's Guide to Radio and Television Broadcasting)). On March 31, 2008, WYLZ changed their call letters to WLUN. With the debut of ESPN 100.9-FM, the sports-talk format returned to the Tri-Cities area for the first time since 1440 AM WMAX discontinued its simulcast of WTRX in Flint.

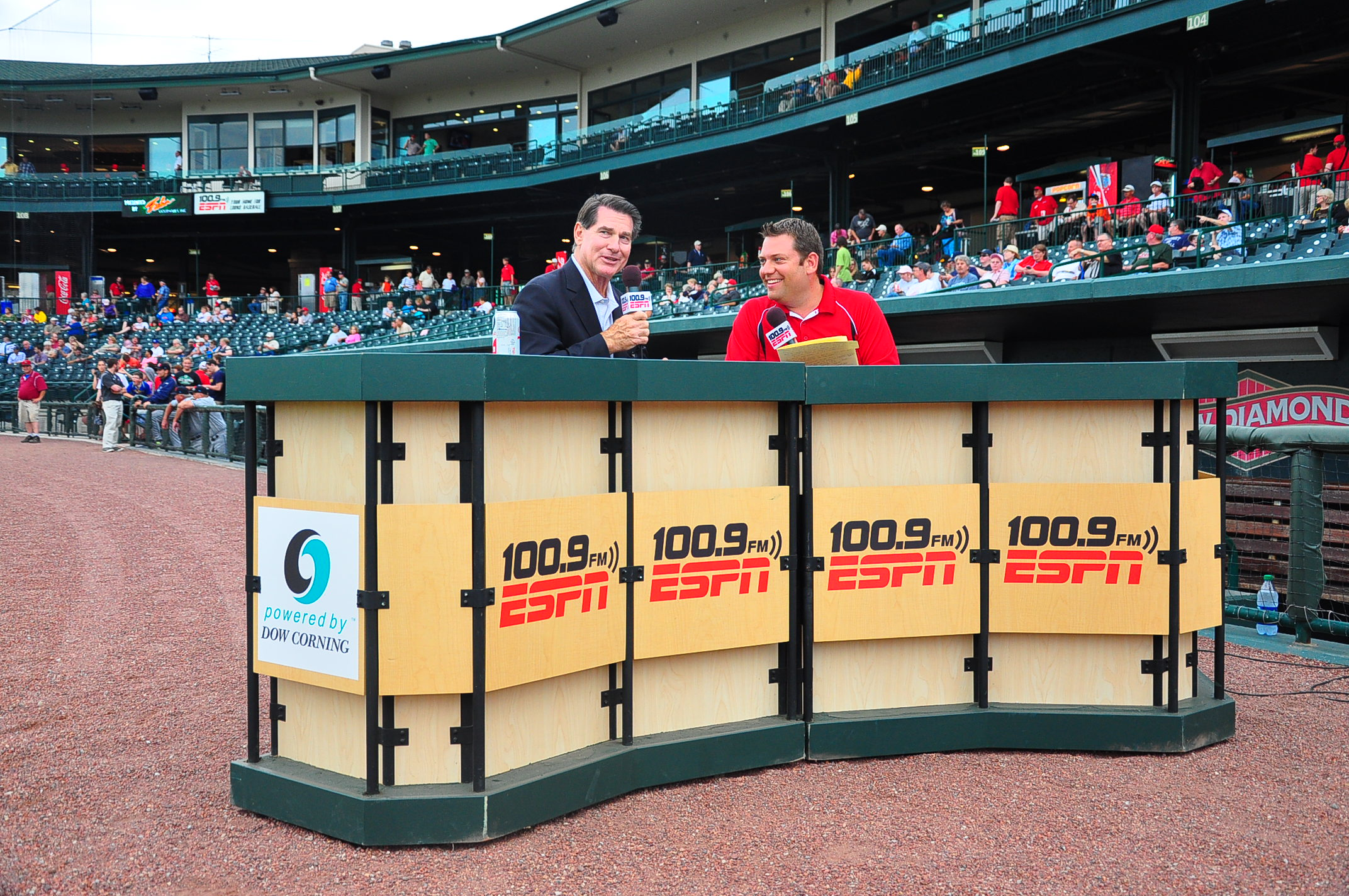
Los Angeles Dodgers great and Michigan State alum Steve Garvey talks with Brad Golder prior to a Great Lakes Loons game at Dow Diamond on June 12, 2013.

MBF, the 501(c)(3) non-profit corporation that owns Dow Diamond, helped finance the purchase. MBF also funded the construction of the radio studio in the Dow Diamond press box, overlooking the baseball field, which was completed in January 2009. In addition to being the flagship station of the Great Lakes Loons (Single-A, Midwest League), the station serves as the home for the Detroit Pistons, Michigan State Spartans, Northwood Timberwolves and high school sports in mid-Michigan. The station has featured on-air personalities including: Mike Greenberg, Mike Golic, Colin Cowherd, Scott Van Pelt, Ryen Russillo, Bill Simonson, Dan Le Batard, Jon Weiner, Trey Wingo, Stephen A. Smith and Matt Shepard.

=== Fox Sports Radio ===
On October 2, 2023, WLUN switched to Fox Sports Radio from Premiere Radio Networks. The change in affiliation followed a 24 hour stunt of the station playing music referencing "fox" such as What Does the Fox Say? and Fox on the Run.

The statewide “Spin on Sports” hosted by Anthony Bellino airs from 6-9am, Fox’s The Dan Patrick Show and The Herd with Colin Cowherd air middays, with Grand Rapids-based “The Huge Show” with Bill Simonson from 3-6pm. Their local in-house show, "The Payoff" with by Ben Bosscher, airs from 6-7pm on weekdays.

On June 2, 2025, "The Ben Bosscher Show" made its debut airing in the midday slot of 9 am to 12 pm formerly occupied by The Dan Patrick Show. The 6 pm to 7 pm slot features the "Best of The Ben Bosscher Show"

== Broadcasters ==
- Brad Tunney (2014 – Present)
- Ben Bosscher (2023 – Present)
- John Vicari (2023 – Present)
- Kyle Sandel (2024 – Present)
- Blake Froling (2018 – 2020)
- Chris Vosters (2015 – 2018)
- Jared Sandler (2012 – 2014)
- Matt Park (2009 – 2012)
- Brad Golder (2007 – 2015)
