= WFXZ (disambiguation) =

WFXZ may refer to:

- WFXZ-CD, a television station (channel 24 virtual/19 digital) licensed to Boston, Massachusetts, United States which has held the WFXZ call sign since 2003
- WBUF, a radio station (92.9 FM) licensed to Buffalo, New York, United States, which held the call sign WFXZ from 1980 to 1981
- WNTB, a radio station (92.3 FM) licensed to Topsail Beach, North Carolina, United States, which held the call sign WFXZ from 2000 to 2003
- WLUN, a radio station (100.9 FM) licensed to Pinconning, Michigan, United States, which held the call sign WFXZ from 1983 to 1984
- WPXU-TV, a television station (channel 34) licensed to Boston, Massachusetts, United States, which held the call sign WFXZ in 1999
- WQSL, a radio station (92.3 FM) licensed to Jacksonville, North Carolina, United States, which held the call sign WFXZ from 1991 to 1994
