= Michigan Baseball Foundation =

American non-profit organization

Michigan Baseball Foundation, Inc.
- Michigan Baseball Foundation logo
- Formation: 2005; 21 years ago
- Founder: William S. Stavropoulos
- Founded at: Midland, Michigan
- Type: Nonprofit
- Tax ID no.: 68-0619551
- Location: Midland, Michigan, United States
- Subsidiaries: MBF Enterprises, Dow Diamond, Great Lakes Loons, & WLUN
- Website: michiganbaseballfoundation.org

The Michigan Baseball Foundation (MBF) is a 501(c)(3) non-profit organization in Midland, Michigan, that refers to itself as a social enterprise. MBF is the current owner and operator of the Dow Diamond – a baseball stadium located in downtown Midland. Through its subsidiary, MBF Enterprises (MBFE), the organization owns the stadium's primary resident – the Great Lakes Loons, and their broadcaster – WLUN. Profits from the operation of the Dow Diamond and the organization's taxable enterprises are donated to youth groups and to initiatives that seek to improve life in Midland and its surrounding areas.

== History ==
MBF began in 2005, when William S. Stavropoulos, then Chairman of the Dow Chemical Company, which is also headquartered in Midland, came up with the idea that minor league baseball could help the hometown of Dow Chemical. He had observed how the introduction of minor league baseball had helped several communities in the United States, and he felt it could similarly "trigger a renaissance" in Midland.

With the backing of Dow Chemical, he turned to others in the Midland area for their combined support. Ultimately, five additional Midland-based organizations (Dow Corning Corporation, the Charles J. Strosacker Foundation, the Rollin M. Gerstacker Foundation, the Herbert H. and Grace A. Dow Foundation, and the Bill and Linda Stavropoulos Foundation) joined Dow Chemical in backing the effort to bring a minor league baseball team to the community. MBF was formed and Stavropoulos was asked to serve as its CEO and Chair.

In 2005 MBF hired Tom Dickson, owner of the Lansing Lugnuts minor league team, as a consultant, and through him in September 2005 MBF negotiated the purchase of the Southwest Michigan Devil Rays of nearby Battle Creek, Michigan.

Initially, MBF’s founders expected the new organization to serve as the owner of both a future minor league team and a baseball stadium. They envisioned that MBF would function as a social enterprise – a tax free non-profit that invests its earnings in charitable activities. However, as MBF awaited approval of the sale by the Midwest League, it sought to register as a 501(c)(3) non-profit with the Internal Revenue Service (IRS) – who responded that they were unwilling to grant a professional baseball team a tax-free status. As a result, MBF’s founders created the Michigan Baseball Operation (MBO) – a separate and taxable corporation owned by the MBF. On June 2, 2006, when the purchase of the team was finalized, MBO became the owner of the Southwest Michigan Devil Rays.

On April 14, 2006, MBF started construction of the team's stadium on land in downtown Midland that had been donated by Dow Chemical. The company also paid for the naming rights to the new ballpark, which became known as the Dow Diamond. As construction of the stadium overlapped with the 2006 baseball season, the Devil Rays continued to play in Battle Creek's C.O. Brown Stadium. At the end of the season the team’s name was changed to the Great Lakes Loons in preparation for their move to Midland.

Construction ended in early 2007, in time so that the Great Lakes Loons could take the field for their first home game on April 13.

Construction of the Dow Diamond cost $34 million, more than the average for a minor league stadium. However, the Dow Diamond is fitted out with many attributes and amenities not generally associated with minor league baseball, e.g., a solar panel powered scoreboard, water bottle fill-up stations, a concourse that can be enclosed for events, and free Wi-Fi available everywhere. In 2007, Ballpark Digest recognized the Dow Diamond as the best ballpark of the year. Stadium Journey has consistently given it high ratings.

MBF purchased WLUN, the official radio broadcaster of the Loons, in 2008.

== Enterprise operations ==
Either directly or through a subsidiary, such as MBF Enterprises, the organization controls the Dow Diamond, the Great Lakes Loons, and WLUN.

=== Dow Diamond ===
A baseball venue constructed, owned, and operated by the MBF. It is located in Midland, Michigan. Its naming rights were purchased by Dow Chemical Company. It is the home venue of the Great Lakes Loons.

=== Great Lakes Loons ===
A minor league baseball team affiliated with the Los Angeles Dodgers. The team's home venue is the MBF's Dow Diamond in Midland, Michigan.

=== WLUN ===
Known as Sports Radio 100.9 The Mitt, WLUN ("Loon") is a Fox Sports Radio affiliated sports radio station based out of Pinconning, Michigan.

== Philanthropic activities and investments ==
Utilizing a social enterprise model, MBF is earning revenues from its enterprise operations. MBF donates profits to support such youth organizations as a girls softball league, the local 4-H association, and the Midland soccer club. In addition, it provides funding for economic development and community improvement.

It is a key supporter of Momentum Midland, a group of projects seeking to improve Midland’s downtown area. Within the framework of Momentum Midland, public recreational facilities are being built along the Tittabawassee River, pedestrian and bike access is being created to downtown Midland, and business activity is being encouraged in the downtown area.
