= Hard Luck =

Hard Luck may refer to:

- Hard Luck (2006 film), an American thriller film
- Hard Luck (1921 film), an American silent comedy film
- Hard Luck, Michigan, a ghost town in Gladwin County, Michigan, U.S.
- Diary of a Wimpy Kid: Hard Luck, a children's novel by Jeff Kinney
- "Hard Luck," a song by White Reaper, from the album You Deserve Love
