= PASD =

PASD may refer to:

- Pinconning Area School District
- Progressive Alliance of Socialists and Democrats
- Phoenixville Area School District
- PAS diastase
- Sand Point Airport (ICAO location indicator: PASD), in Sand Point, Alaska, United States
