= Standish Township, Michigan =

- Civil township
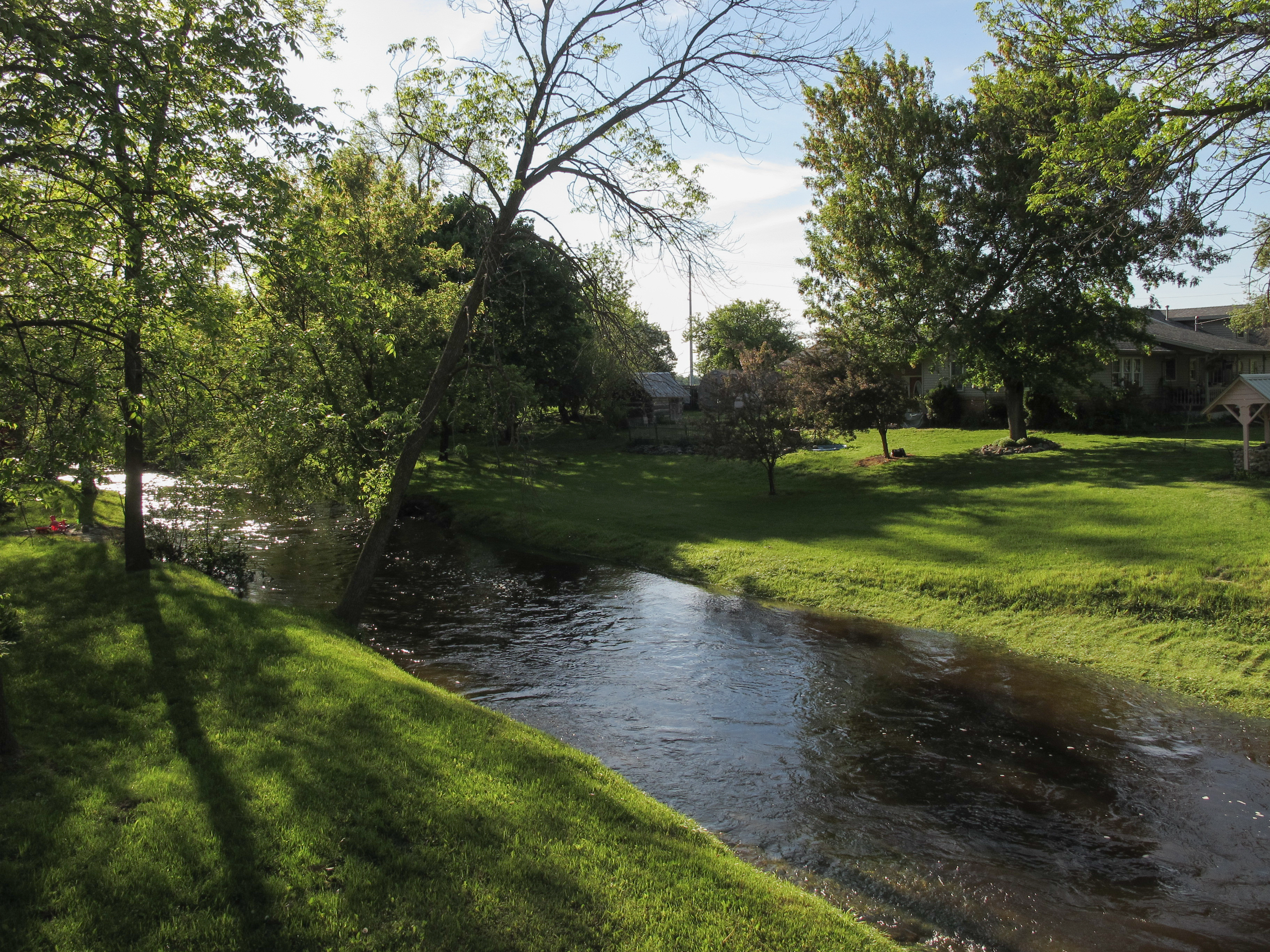
- The Saganing River viewed upstream from the west side of Sturman Road

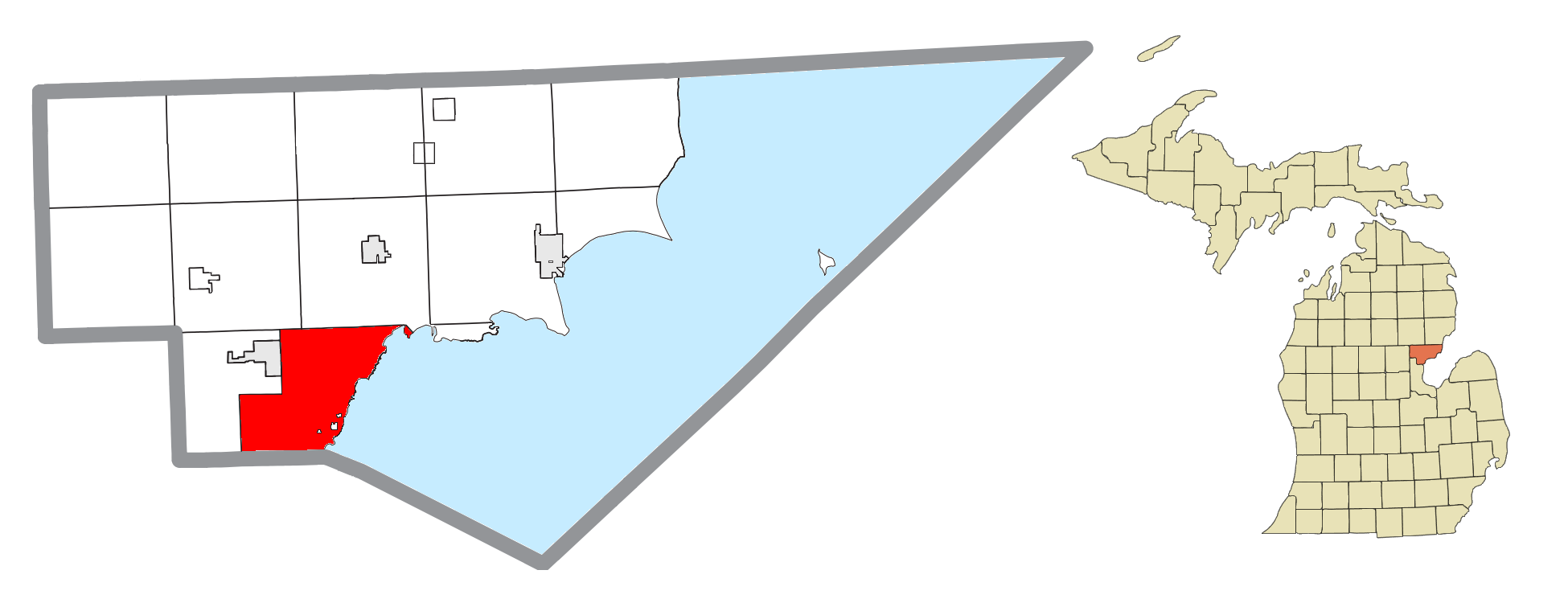
- Location within Arenac County

- Location within the state of Michigan Standish Township (the United States)
- Coordinates: 43°57′08″N 83°54′16″W
- Country: United States
- State: Michigan
- County: Arenac

Government
  - Supervisor: Robert North

Area
  - Total: 30.5 sq mi (79.0 km^{2})
  - Land: 27.6 sq mi (71.6 km^{2})
  - Water: 2.9 sq mi (7.4 km^{2})
- Elevation: 607 ft (185 m)

Population (2020)
  - Total: 1,701
  - Density: 61.5/sq mi (23.8/km^{2})
- Time zone: UTC-5 (Eastern (EST))
  - Summer (DST): UTC-4 (EDT)
- ZIP code(s): 48650, 48658
- Area code: 989
- FIPS code: 26-76140
- GNIS feature ID: 1627119
- Website: https://standishtownship.gov/

Standish Township is a civil township of Arenac County in the U.S. state of Michigan. The population was 1,701 at the 2020 census. The city of Standish borders the township on the northwest but is administered autonomously.

== Communities ==
- Pine River is an unincorporated community located at 43°59′00″N 83°53′19″W with the northeast portion of the township approximately 3.5 miles (5.6 km) east of Standish at .
- Whites Beach is an unincorporated community located with the southeast portion of the township along the shore of Lake Huron. Whites Beach is located next to Off-reservation trust land of the Isabella Indian Reservation which is the land base of the Saginaw Chippewa Tribal Nation.

== Geography ==
According to the United States Census Bureau, the township has a total area of 30.5 square miles (79.0 km^{2}), of which 27.6 square miles (71.6 km^{2}) is land and 2.9 square miles (7.4 km^{2}), or 9.41%, is water.

== Demographics ==
As of the census of 2000, there were 2,026 people, 802 households, and 575 families residing in the township. The population density was 73.2 inhabitants per square mile (28.3/km^{2}). There were 1,033 housing units at an average density of 37.3 per square mile (14.4/km^{2}). The racial makeup of the township was 97.09% White, 0.15% African American, 1.43% Native American, 0.15% Asian, 0.20% from other races, and 0.99% from two or more races. Hispanic or Latino of any race were 1.63% of the population.

There were 802 households, out of which 29.6% had children under the age of 18 living with them, 57.5% were married couples living together, 9.9% had a female householder with no husband present, and 28.2% were non-families. 23.3% of all households were made up of individuals, and 10.0% had someone living alone who was 65 years of age or older. The average household size was 2.53 and the average family size was 2.97.

In the township the population was spread out, with 24.6% under the age of 18, 7.5% from 18 to 24, 27.6% from 25 to 44, 27.6% from 45 to 64, and 12.7% who were 65 years of age or older. The median age was 39 years. For every 100 females, there were 101.2 males. For every 100 females age 18 and over, there were 99.2 males.

The median income for a household in the township was $36,894, and the median income for a family was $41,296. Males had a median income of $30,809 versus $18,819 for females. The per capita income for the township was $17,252. About 10.6% of families and 11.5% of the population were below the poverty line, including 21.5% of those under age 18 and 4.8% of those age 65 or over.
