= Gil Velazquez =

Mexican and American baseball player (born 1979)

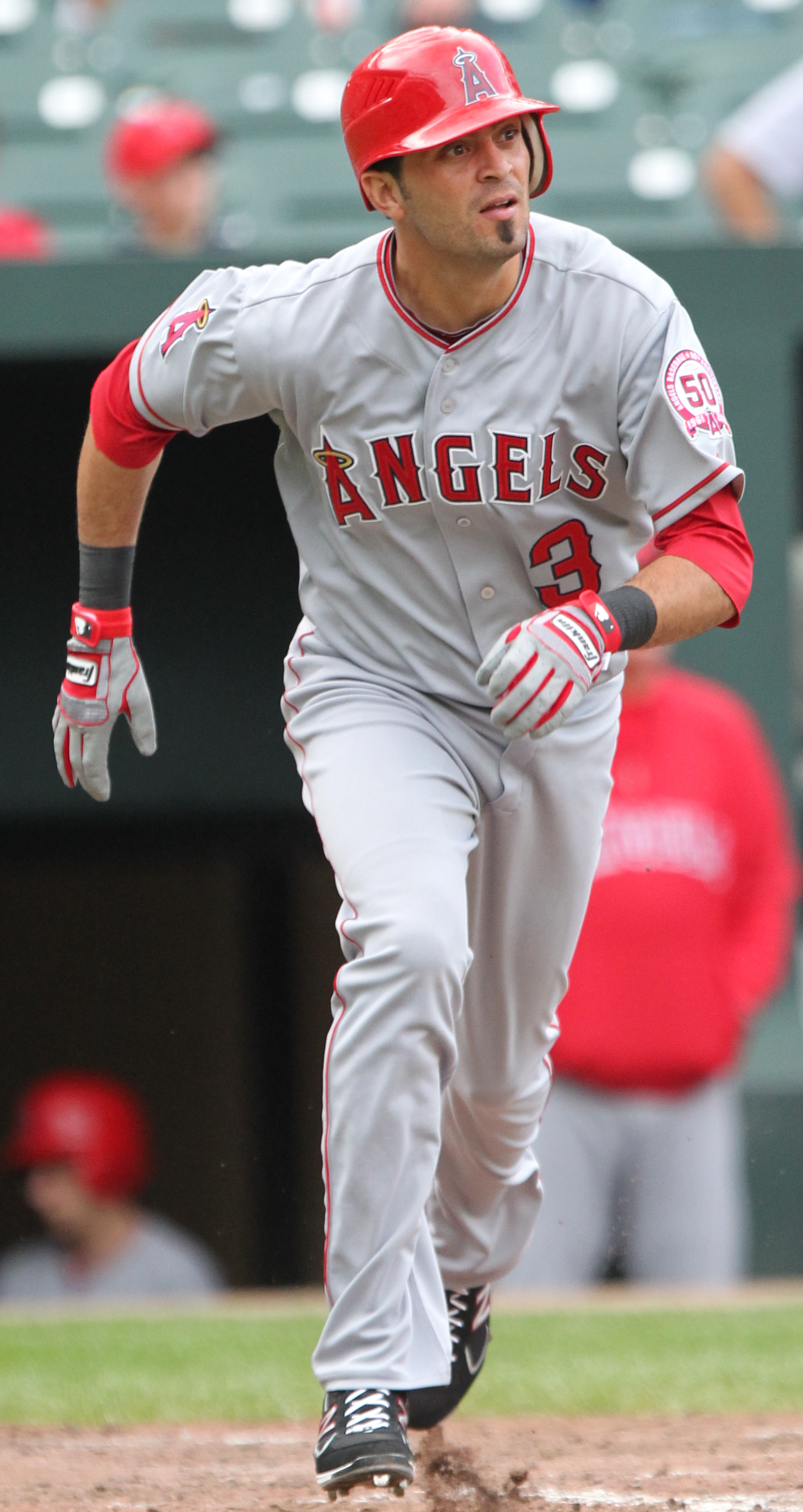
- Velazquez with the Los Angeles Angles of Anaheim
- Infielder
- Born: October 17, 1979 (age 46); Los Angeles, California, U.S.
- Batted: Right Threw: Right

MLB debut
- September 25, 2008, for the Boston Red Sox

Last MLB appearance
- August 22, 2013, for the Miami Marlins

MLB statistics
- Batting average: .233
- Home runs: 0
- Runs batted in: 4
- Stats at Baseball Reference

Teams
- As player: Boston Red Sox (2008–2009); Los Angeles Angels of Anaheim (2011); Miami Marlins (2012–2013); As coach: Arizona Diamondbacks (2019–2024)

Gilbert Arnulfo Velazquez (born October 17, 1979) is a Mexican and American former professional baseball infielder and current coach. He is currently the defensive coordinator for the Arizona Diamondbacks of Major League Baseball (MLB). He is 6 feet 2 inches (1.88 m) tall and weighs 225 pounds (102 kg). Velazquez is a graduate of Paramount High School in Paramount, California. Velazquez played in MLB for the Boston Red Sox, Los Angeles Angels of Anaheim, and Miami Marlins.

== Playing career ==
=== New York Mets ===
Velazquez was drafted by the New York Mets in the 14th round of the 1998 Major League Baseball draft and made his pro debut with the rookie-level Gulf Coast League Mets the same year. He remained in the Mets farm system through 2004, playing for the Kingsport Mets of the Appalachian League, Capital City Bombers of the South Atlantic League, St. Lucie Mets of the Florida State League, Binghamton Mets of the Eastern League and Norfolk Tides of the International League.

=== Minnesota Twins ===
Velazquez signed as a minor league free agent with the Minnesota Twins on November 15, 2004, where he remained through 2007. With the Twins he split his time between the Eastern League's New Britain Rock Cats and the International Leagues' Rochester Red Wings.

=== Boston Red Sox ===
Velazquez signed a minor league contract with the Boston Red Sox on December 7, 2007, and was invited to spring training. He played the majority of the season with the team's Triple-A affiliate, the Pawtucket Red Sox, but was called up late in the season. Velazquez made his Major League debut on September 25, 2008, and played in two more games afterwards with one hit in eight at-bats. His hit was an RBI single to left field off of Alfredo Aceves of the New York Yankees on September 26.

After Mike Lowell was placed on the disabled list in the middle of the 2008 American League Division Series, Velazquez filled his roster spot, and became eligible to play in game four of the playoffs after only three major league appearances and one major league hit, he did not appear in the series.

Velazquez was invited to 2009 spring training as well after signing a new minor league contract on November 10, 2008. On April 11, 2009, he was called up to the Red Sox while Julio Lugo spent time on the disabled list. Gil was optioned back to Pawtucket when Boston called up Michael Bowden. On May 12, 2009, Velazquez was recalled to Boston when Kevin Youkilis was placed on the 15-day disabled list. Velazquez was optioned back to Pawtucket on May 20 when Kevin Youkilis was activated from the disabled list. On August 5, Velazquez was designated for assignment. He appeared in a total of six games with the Red Sox and did not record a hit in his two-at-bats.

On January 15, 2010, Velazquez was re-signed by the Red Sox and again invited to spring training. He spent the entire 2010 season with Pawtucket, where he finished the season with a .249 average.

=== Los Angeles Angels of Anaheim ===
Velazquez was signed by the Los Angeles Angels of Anaheim on January 14, 2011, to a minor league contract with an invite to spring training.

He was assigned to the Angels' Triple-A Pacific Coast League affiliate, the Salt Lake Bees, on April 6, 2011. There, Velazquez was named to the 2011 PCL All-Star team. Velazquez, a 31-year-old native of Los Angeles, appeared in 123 games for the Bees in 2011, hitting a team-high and career-high .328 with 25 doubles, five triples, eight home runs, 58 RBI, and 17 stolen bases.

The Angels recalled Velazquez on Tuesday, September 6, 2011, during September roster expansions. Velazquez, who plays second base, third base and shortstop, made his Angels debut on September 16, pinch hitting against the Baltimore Orioles. Velazquez appeared in three more games in 2011. He had three hits in six at-bats. Velazquez elected free agency following the season on November 4.

=== Miami Marlins ===
On December 30, 2011, Velazquez signed a minor league contract with the Miami Marlins, and was assigned to their Triple-A affiliate, the New Orleans Zephyrs. On August 16, Velazquez was called up to the major league team. The next day, he started in his first game for the Marlins. Velazquez finished the season batting .232 in 56 at-bats with two RBI, no homers, one double and walk, in 19 games. He was outrighted off the Marlins roster on October 4, 2013, and elected free agency rather than accept an outright assignment to New Orleans.

=== Leones de Yucatán ===
On April 8, 2014, Velazquez signed with the Leones de Yucatán of the Mexican League. In 103 appearances for Yucatán, he slashed .288/.375/.363 with three home runs, 35 RBI, and three stolen bases. Velazquez was released by the Leones on February 17, 2025.

== Coaching career ==
=== Los Angeles Dodgers ===
In 2015, Velazquez retired from playing to become a coach for the Arizona League Dodgers, the rookie-level affiliate for the Los Angeles Dodgers. The following year, he was named manager of the Great Lakes Loons, the Dodgers' Single-A affiliate in the Midwest League.

=== Arizona Diamondbacks ===
On February 1, 2022, the Arizona Diamondbacks hired Velazquez to serve as the manager for their Triple-A affiliate, the Reno Aces. The Aces won the Pacific Coast League championship, and Velazquez was named Minor League Manager of the Year following the season.

=== New York Yankees ===
On January 29, 2025, Velasquez was hired to serve as the bench coach for the Scranton/Wilkes-Barre Railriders, the Triple-A affiliate of the New York Yankees.

== International career ==
Velazquez was called up to play for the Mexico national baseball team at the 2013 World Baseball Classic.
