= Great Lakes Loons =

American Minor League baseball team

- Founded in 1982 in Springfield, Illinois; Based in Midland, Michigan since 2007
Team logo
Cap insignia

Minor league affiliations
- Class: High-A (2021–present)
- Previous classes: Class A (1982–2020)
- League: Midwest League (1982–present)
- Division: East Division

Major league affiliations
- Team: Los Angeles Dodgers (2007–present)
- Previous teams: Tampa Bay Devil Rays (2005–2006); New York Yankees (2003–2004); Houston Astros (1999–2002); Boston Red Sox (1995–1998); St. Louis Cardinals (1982–1994)

Minor league titles
- League titles (2): 2000; 2016
- Division titles (1): 2023
- First-half titles (2): 2022; 2023
- Second-half titles (1): 2026

Team data
- Name: Great Lakes Loons (2007–present); Southwest Michigan Devil Rays (2005–2006); Battle Creek Yankees (2003–2004); Michigan Battle Cats (1995–2002); Madison Hatters (1994); Springfield Cardinals (1982–1993)
- Colors: Desert red, metallic black, Green Bay green, cool gray, white
- Mascot: Lou E. Loon (2007–present); Rall E. Camel (2012–present); Doodle the Eagle (2003–2006); Rally Cat (1995–2002)
- Ballpark: Dow Diamond (2007–present)
- Previous parks: C.O. Brown Stadium (1995–2006); Warner Park (1994); Lanphier Park (1982–1993)
- Owner/ Operator: Michigan Baseball Foundation
- General manager: Chris Mundhenk
- Manager: Jair Fernandez
- Website: milb.com/great-lakes

The Great Lakes Loons are a Minor League Baseball team of the Midwest League and the High-A affiliate of the Los Angeles Dodgers. They are located in Midland, Michigan, and play their home games at Dow Diamond, which opened in April 2007.

== History ==
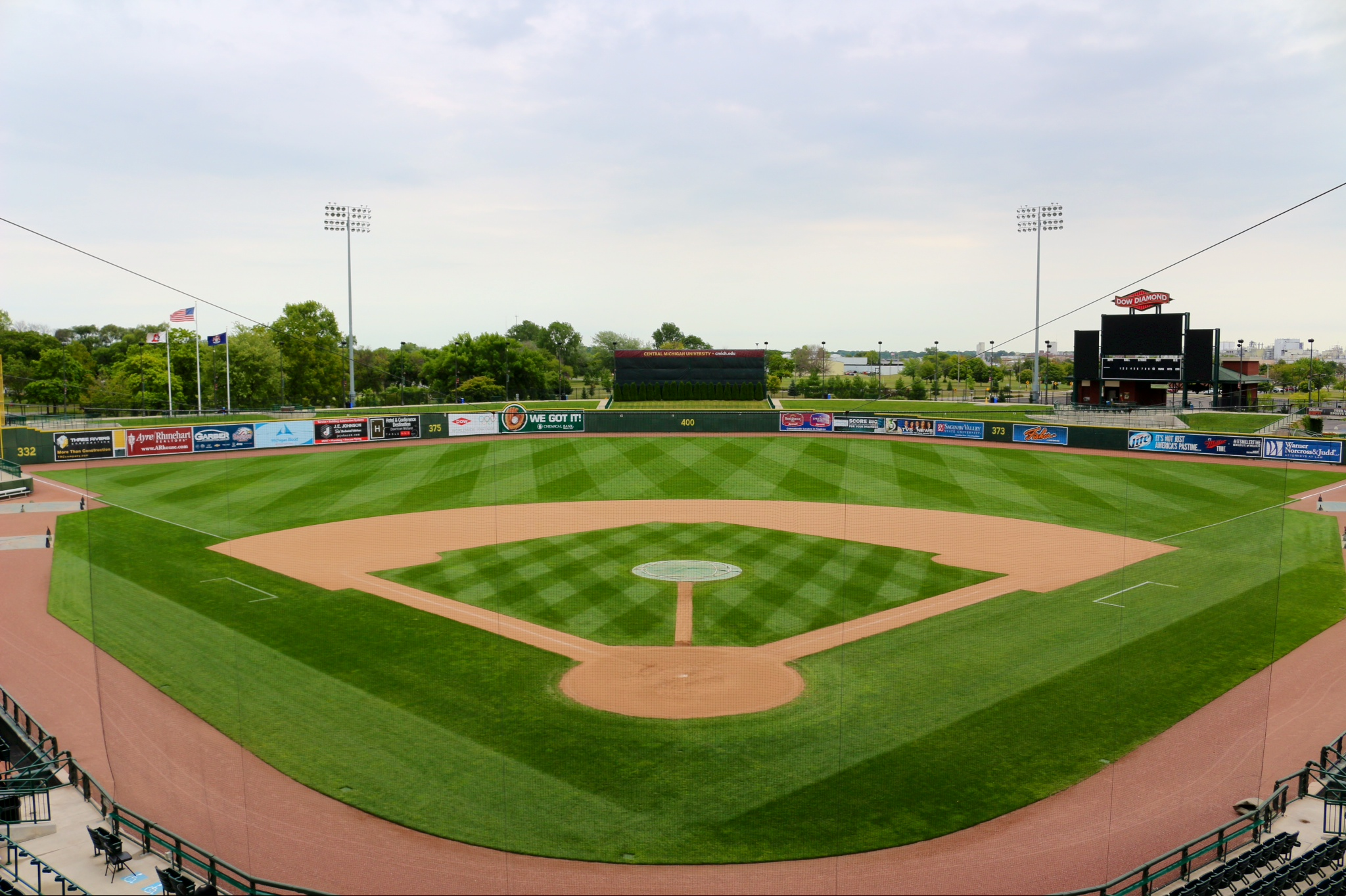
The Loons play at Dow Diamond in Midland, Michigan.

The Midwest League came to Battle Creek, in 1995 after the franchise formerly known as the Madison Hatters moved. The team was first known as the Battle Creek Golden Kazoos. Due to a trademark dispute and general fan dissatisfaction with the name (which is a nickname for the nearby city of Kalamazoo), the name was changed to the Michigan Battle Cats on March 9, 1995.

The team was affiliated with the Boston Red Sox (1995–98) and Houston Astros (1999–2002). The team changed its name to the Battle Creek Yankees after becoming an affiliate of the New York Yankees in 2003. The Tampa Bay Devil Rays took over affiliation of the team after the 2004 season, and the team name was changed to the Southwest Michigan Devil Rays.

In January 2006, the Devil Rays were sold to the non-profit Michigan Baseball Foundation and relocated to Midland, Michigan, in 2007. The team was renamed the Great Lakes Loons. A lack of interest from the Battle Creek community was the main reason for the move. Reduced ticket prices (even a night when fans were actually offered a dollar to come to that night's game) failed to pique the interest of local residents.

Naming rights for the Loons' stadium were purchased by Dow Chemical, which is headquartered in Midland. The company named the stadium "Dow Diamond." Ground was broken on the stadium on April 11, 2006, with construction taking 367 days to complete. In September 2006, the team announced its new affiliation with the Los Angeles Dodgers. In November 2006, the Loons named Lance Parrish as the team's first manager since the move to Michigan's Tri-City Area. The first home game was played on April 13, 2007.

After nine seasons in Midland, the Loons went through an overhaul of their logos and brand heading into its 10th season in 2016.

On September 18, 2016, the Loons clinched their first Midwest League championship following a 9–8 victory over the Seattle Mariners-affiliated Clinton LumberKings. The Loons won the championship series 3–1, following three-game series victories over the Bowling Green Hot Rods (Tampa Bay Rays) and West Michigan Whitecaps (Detroit Tigers) in the previous rounds. The Loons were managed by Gil Velazquez.

The Loons have hosted the Midwest League All-Star Game on two occasions (2008 and 2017).

On August 23, 2019, the Loons hosted their largest crowd ever of 6,671 people.

In conjunction with Major League Baseball's restructuring of Minor League Baseball in 2021, the Loons were organized into the High-A Central. In 2022, the High-A Central became known as the Midwest League, the name historically used by the regional circuit prior to the 2021 reorganization.

== Season-by-season records ==
Michigan Battle Cats (1995–2002)
Season	Record	Finish	Manager	Playoffs
1995	75–62	4th	DeMarlo Hale	Lost League Finals
1996	60–78	11th	Tom Barrett	
1997	70–67	4th	Billy Gardner, Jr.	Lost in 1st round
1998	79–61	2nd (t)	Billy Gardner, Jr.	Lost in 1st round
1999	76–62	3rd	Al Pedrique	Lost in 1st round
2000	82–56	2nd	Al Pedrique	League champions
2001	82–55	3rd	John Massarelli	Lost in 1st round
2002	79–61	4th	John Massarelli	Lost in 1st round
Battle Creek Yankees (2003–2004)
Year	Record	Finish	Manager	Playoffs
2003	73–64	3rd	Mitch Seoane	Lost in 2nd round
2004	71–68	9th	Mitch Seoane (13–18) / Bill Mosiello (58–50)	
Southwest Michigan Devil Rays (2005–2006)
Year	Record	Finish	Manager	Playoffs
2005	72–67	4th (t)	Joe Szekely	Lost in 1st round to SB
2006	62–77	12th	Skeeter Barnes	
Great Lakes Loons (2007–present)
Year	Record	Finish	Manager	Playoffs
2007	57–82	5th	Lance Parrish	
2008	54–85	6th	Juan Bustabad	
2009	81–59	2nd	Juan Bustabad	Lost in 2nd round to FW
2010	90–49	1st	Juan Bustabad	Lost in 2nd round to LC
2011	72–67	4th	John Shoemaker	
2012	67–73	6th	John Shoemaker	
2013	67–72	5th	Razor Shines	Lost in 1st round to SB
2014	66–73	4th	Bill Haselman	
2015	68–69	7th	Luis Matos	Lost in 1st round to LAN
2016	65–75	6th	Gil Velazquez	League champions
2017	69–70	5th	Jeremy Rodriguez	
2018	60–77	6th	John Shoemaker	Lost in 1st round to West Michigan
2019	81-55	1st	John Shoemaker	Lost in 2nd Round to South Bend
2020	Season cancelled (COVID-19 pandemic)			
2021	63-57	3rd	Austin Chubb	Lost in Division Championships to Lake County
2022	76-55	2nd	Austin Chubb	
2023	76-55	1st	Daniel Nava	Lost in League Championship to Cedar Rapids
2024	69-61	3rd	Jair Fernandez	Lost in Division Championships to Dayton
2025	72-58	3rd	Jair Fernandez	

== Mascot ==
Lou E. Loon is the team mascot and Ambassador of Fun for the team. He's a bird who dances at home games and make public appearances. The kids' play area at the diamond is named Lou E.'s Lookout in his honor. He often leads fans in his signature cheer, the "Funky Feather", which won "Best In-Game Promotion of the Year" in 2009 for Minor League Baseball. In 2024, Lou E Loon was voted as runner up for the best minor league mascot by USA Today's Reader Choice Awards.

"Rall E. Camel" was introduced as the team's second mascot in April 2012. He is an deputy ambassador of mischief to the staff of the Great Lakes Loons.

== Roster ==
Great Lakes Loons roster
Players	Coaches/Other
Pitchers: 34 Brooks Auger; 39 Isaac Ayon; 10 Seamus Barrett; -- Ryan Brown; 28 Maddux Bruns; 41 Justin Chambers; 20 Davis Chastain; 8 Nicolas Cruz; 11 Dilan Figueredo; 45 Jacob Frost; 44 Will Gagnon; 1 Joseilyn Gonzalez; 25 Tyler Gough; 26 Hyun-seok Jang; 19 Matt Lanzendorfer; 16 Cam Leiter; 5 Alex Makarewich; 30 Cody Morse; 9 Sterling Patick; 35 Robby Porco; -- Noah Ruen; -- Logan Tabling; 14 Jakob Wright; 15 Reynaldo Yean; Catchers: 33 Andson Aroz; 17 Gio Cueto; -- Jesus Galiz; 51 Victor Rodrigues; Infielders: 16 Cameron Decker; 13 Eduardo Guerrero; 12 Chase Harlan; 3 Mairo Martinus; 7 Emil Morales; 21 Nico Perez; Outfielders: 36 Jaron Elkins; 40 Jose Meza; 22 Samuel Munoz	Manager: 18 Jair Fernandez; Coaches: 19 Brandon Bailey (pitching); 10 Jose Capellan (bullpen catcher); 31 Richard De Los Santos (pitching); 26 Kupono Decker (development); 37 Marco Hernandez (bench); 24 Kevin Lachance (hitting); -- Walter Lindo (performance); 7-day injured list; * On Los Angeles Dodgers 40-man roster; ~ Development list; # Rehab assignment; ∞ Reserve list; ‡ Restricted list; § Suspended list; † Temporarily inactive list; Roster updated September 14, 2026; Transactions; → More rosters: MiLB • Midwest League; → Los Angeles Dodgers minor league players

== Notable Great Lakes Loons alumni ==
- Scott Barlow
- Rafael Betancourt (1996)
- John Buck (1999–2000) MLB All-Star
- Walker Buehler (2016) Combined no-hitter
- Melky Cabrera (2004) MLB All-Star
- Tyler Clippard (2004) 2-time MLB All-Star
- Wade Davis (2006) 3-time MLB All-Star
- Justin Duchscherer (1997) 2-time MLB All-Star
- Dee Gordon (2009) 2-time MLB All-Star; 2015 NL batting title
- Shea Hillenbrand (1997–1998) 2-time MLB All-Star
- Kenley Jansen (2007–2008) 2-time MLB All-Star
- John Jaso (2005)
- Clayton Kershaw (2007) 8-time MLB All-Star; 5-time NL ERA title (2011–2014, 2016); 3-time NL Cy Young Award (2011, 2013–2014); 3-time World Series Champion (2020, 2024, 2025)
- Jason Lane (2000)
- Aaron Miles (1997)
- Roy Oswalt (1999) 3-time MLB All-Star; 2006 NL ERA title
- Lance Parrish (2007, MGR) 8-time MLB All-Star
- Carl Pavano (1997) MLB All-Star
- Joc Pederson (2011) 2-time MLB All-Star
- Chad Qualls (2001)
- Tim Redding (1999)
- Bubby Rossman (2015)
- Carlos Santana (2007) All-Star
- Johan Santana 4-time MLB All-Star; 3-time AL ERA title (2004, 2006, 2008); 2-time AL Cy Young Award (2004, 2006)
- Corey Seager (2014) 5-time MLB All-Star (2016, 2017, 2022, 2023, 2024); 2016 NL Rookie of the Year; 2-time World Series MVP & Champion (2020, 2023)

== See also ==
- WLUN (sports radio station owned by the Loons)

== Sources ==
- Dinda, J. (2003). "Battle Creek, Michigan, in the Midwest League".
