= Grim Township, Michigan =

- Civil township
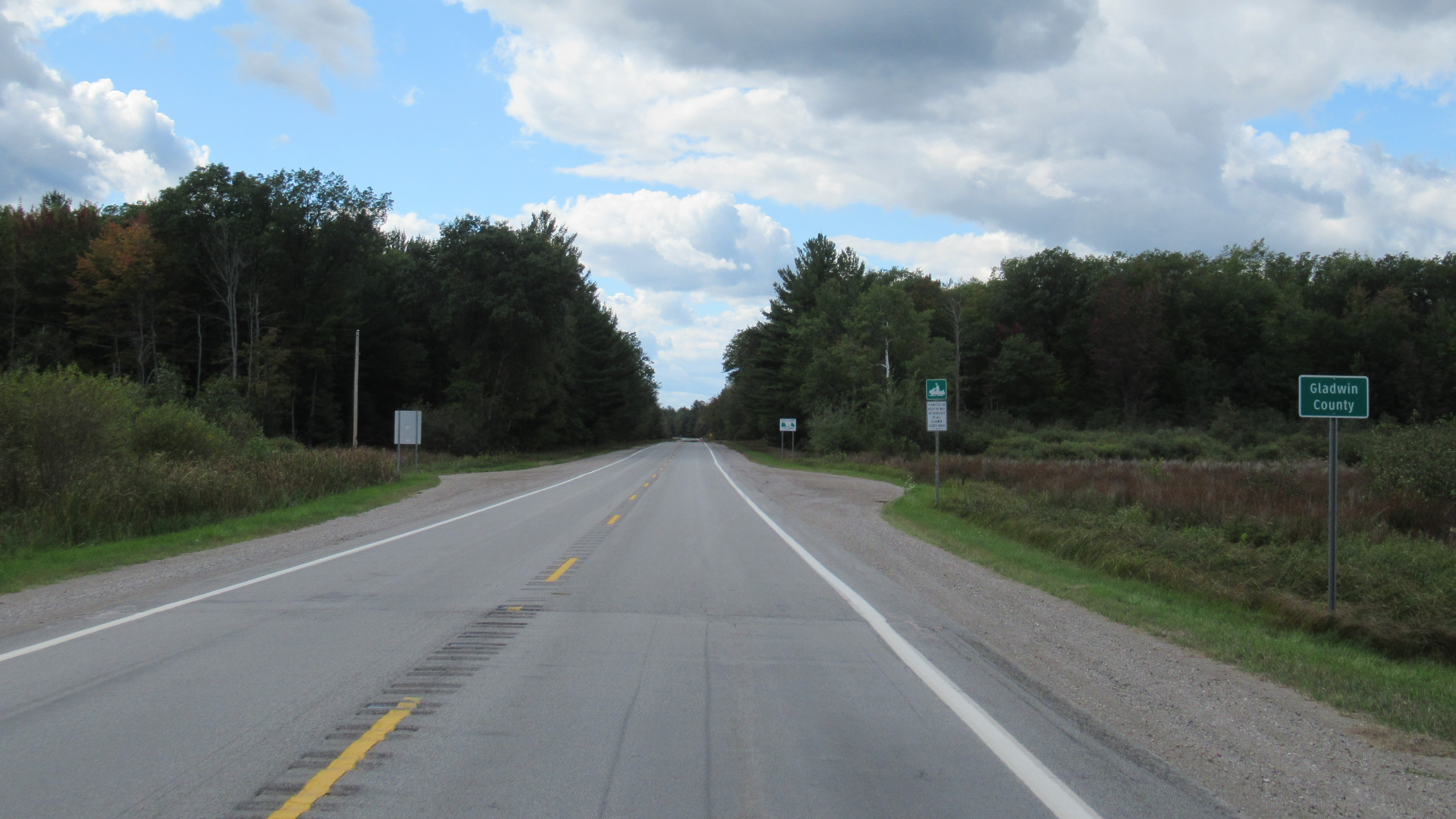
- Entering westbound along M-61

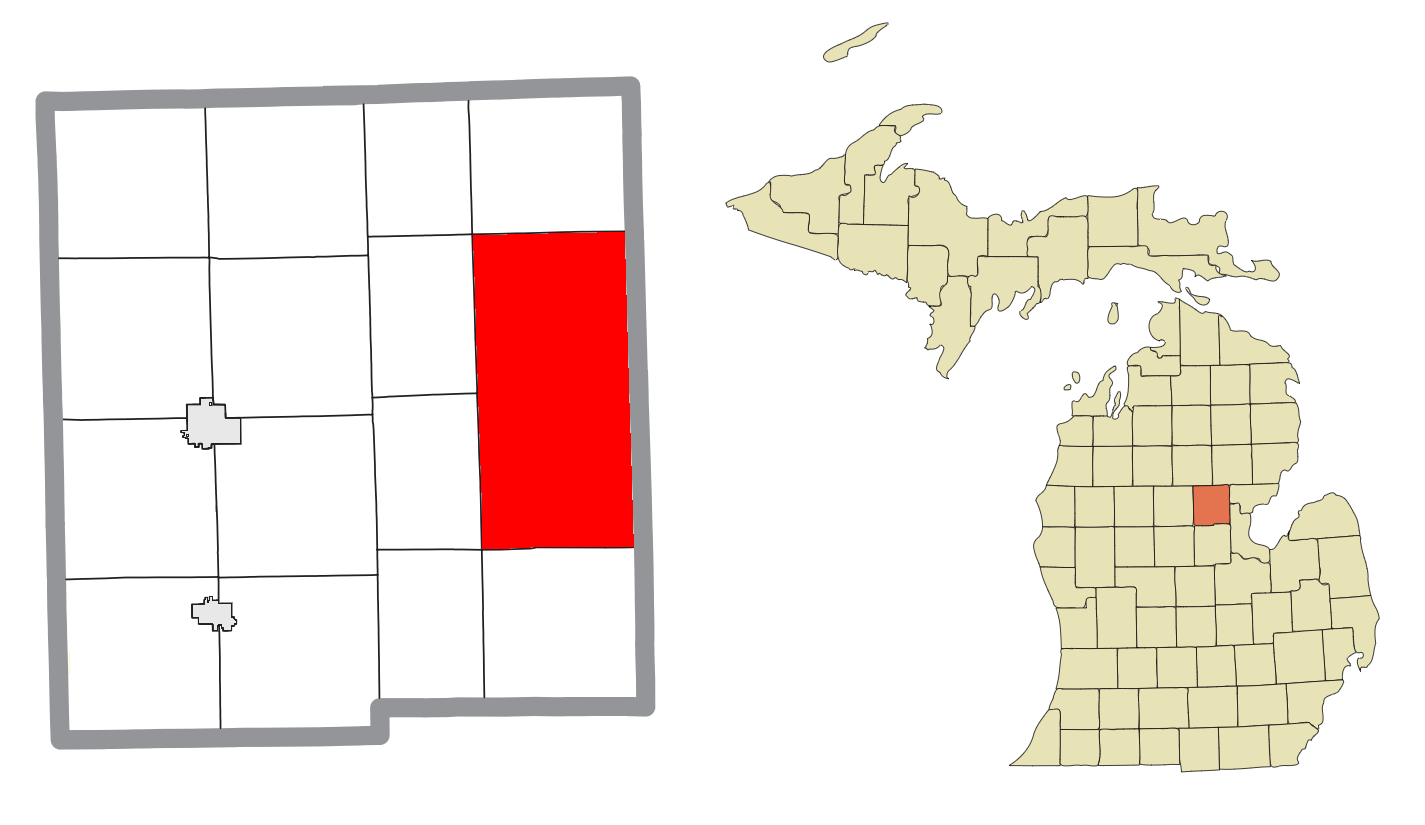
- Location within Gladwin County

- Location within the state of Michigan Location within the United States
- Coordinates: 43°59′14″N 84°14′8″W
- Country: United States
- State: Michigan
- County: Gladwin

Government
  - Supervisor: Andy Schneider
  - Clerk: Linda O'Dell

Area
  - Total: 71.32 sq mi (184.72 km^{2})
  - Land: 70.30 sq mi (182.08 km^{2})
  - Water: 1.02 sq mi (2.64 km^{2})
- Elevation: 750 ft (230 m)

Population (2010)
  - Total: 136
  - Density: 1.93/sq mi (0.75/km^{2})
- Time zone: UTC-5 (Eastern (EST))
  - Summer (DST): UTC-4 (EDT)
- ZIP code(s): 48610 (Alger); 48612 (Beaverton); 48613 (Bentley); 48624 (Gladwin)
- Area code: 989
- FIPS code: 26-35340
- GNIS feature ID: 1625138

Grim Township is a civil township of Gladwin County in the U.S. state of Michigan. The population was 136 at the 2010 census.

Grim Township is the least densely-populated municipality in the state's Lower Peninsula, as well as the Lower Peninsula's third least-populated township after Pointe Aux Barques Township and Zilwaukee Township.

== Communities ==
- Hard Luck was an unincorporated community located within the township at 44°04′18″N 84°11′35″W. Originally a lumber town along the Michigan Central Railroad, the community contained its own post office from April 24, 1904 until August 31, 1906. The community is now a ghost town with no remaining structures.

== Geography ==
According to the U.S. Census Bureau, the township has a total area of 71.32 square miles (184.72 km^{2}), of which 70.30 square miles (182.08 km^{2}) is land and 1.02 square miles (2.64 km^{2}) (1.43%) is water.

=== Major highways ===
- M-61 runs west–east near through center of the township.

== Demographics ==
As of the census of 2000, there were 129 people, 49 households, and 39 families residing in the township. The population density was 1.8 inhabitants per square mile (0.69/km^{2}). There were 123 housing units at an average density of 1.7 per square mile (0.66/km^{2}). The racial makeup of the township was 96.90% White, 3.10% from other races. Hispanic or Latino of any race were 3.10% of the population.

There were 49 households, out of which 30.6% had children under the age of 18 living with them, 61.2% were married couples living together, 8.2% had a female householder with no husband present, and 20.4% were non-families. 14.3% of all households were made up of individuals, and 4.1% had someone living alone who was 65 years of age or older. The average household size was 2.63 and the average family size was 2.90.

In the township the population was spread out, with 27.9% under the age of 18, 5.4% from 18 to 24, 26.4% from 25 to 44, 28.7% from 45 to 64, and 11.6% who were 65 years of age or older. The median age was 37 years. For every 100 females, there were 101.6 males. For every 100 females age 18 and over, there were 121.4 males.

The median income for a household in the township was $27,000, and the median income for a family was $36,250. Males had a median income of $45,625 versus $21,875 for females. The per capita income for the township was $24,326. There were 18.4% of families and 27.5% of the population living below the poverty line, including 40.7% of under eighteens and 15.4% of those over 64.
