= Mount Forest Township, Michigan =

- Civil township
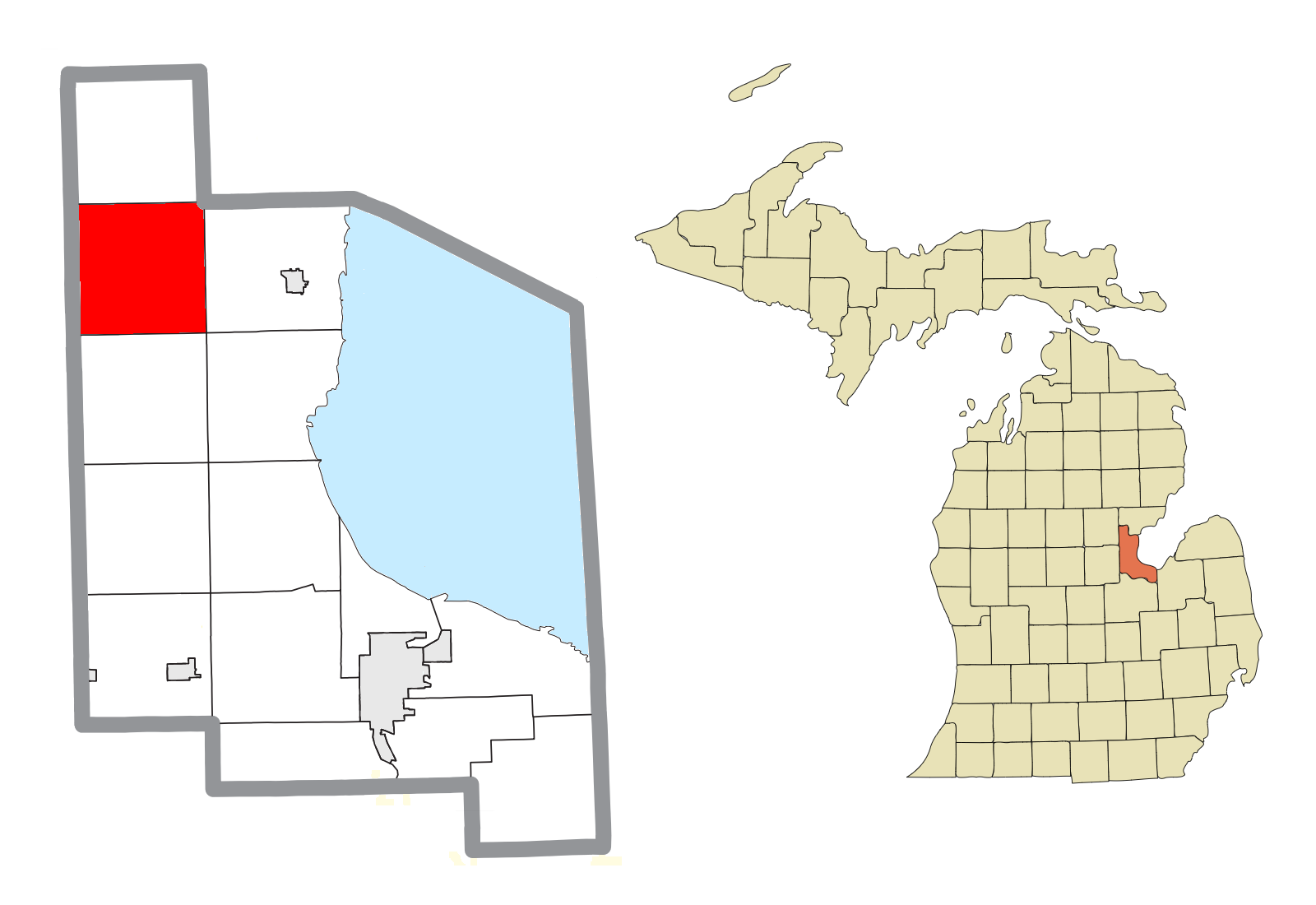
- Location within Bay County

- Location within the state of Michigan Mount Forest Township (the United States)
- Coordinates: 43°51′52″N 84°05′42″W
- Country: United States
- State: Michigan
- County: Bay

Area
  - Total: 35.92 sq mi (93.04 km^{2})
  - Land: 35.91 sq mi (93.01 km^{2})
  - Water: 0.012 sq mi (0.03 km^{2})
- Elevation: 673 ft (205 m)

Population (2020)
  - Total: 1,399
  - Density: 38.96/sq mi (15.04/km^{2})
- Time zone: UTC-5 (Eastern (EST))
  - Summer (DST): UTC-4 (EDT)
- ZIP code(s): 48613 (Bentley); 48650 (Pinconning); 48652 (Rhodes)
- Area code: 989
- FIPS code: 26-55920
- GNIS feature ID: 1626772

Mount Forest Township is a civil township of Bay County in the U.S. state of Michigan. The township's population was 1,399 as of the 2020 census. It is included in the Bay City Metropolitan Statistical Area.

== Communities ==
The township has two unincorporated communities within its borders:

- Mount Forest is between 11 Mile Road and Carter Road, centered on Main Street and Sand Road. (43°53′14″N 84°06′51″W ; Elevation: 692 ft./211 m.) It was a sawmill settlement with a station on the Michigan Central Railroad in 1888. A post office was established on October 12, 1888. The spelling was changed to Mountforest on September 7, 1894, and was closed on March 31, 1955.
- Nine Mile is located on Nine Mile Road between Mount Forest Road and Cody Estey Road at Wirble Road 43°52′36″N 84°03′55″W. It was a station on the Michigan Central Railroad in 1894.

== History ==
Glencoe Post Office opened on August 18, 1876, and is believed to have been on the northeast corner of Bay Gladwin Line Road and Townline 16 Road. It operated for two years, being discontinued on May 28, 1878.

On October 12, 1888, Mountforest Post Office opened in Mount Forest. Bertie Post Office was opened on June 21, 1899, with storekeeper Locius Fogelsanger as the first postmaster.

The Bertie post office ended operations on October 31, 1903. The Mountforest PO was closed on Mar 31, 1955.

== Geography ==
According to the United States Census Bureau, the township has a total area of 35.9 square miles (93.0 km^{2}), of which 0.012 square miles (0.03 km^{2}), or 0.04%, is water. The Pinconning River has its headwaters in the township.

== Demographics ==
As of the census of 2000, there were 1,405 people, 523 households, and 403 families residing in the township. The population density was 39.0 inhabitants per square mile (15.1/km^{2}). There were 550 housing units at an average density of 15.3 per square mile (5.9/km^{2}). The racial makeup of the township was 97.86% White, 0.93% Native American, 0.57% from other races, and 0.64% from two or more races. Hispanic or Latino of any race were 1.78% of the population.

There were 523 households, out of which 33.3% had children under the age of 18 living with them, 67.3% were married couples living together, 6.3% had a female householder with no husband present, and 22.9% were non-families. 18.7% of all households were made up of individuals, and 6.7% had someone living alone who was 65 years of age or older. The average household size was 2.69 and the average family size was 3.09.

In the township the population was spread out, with 26.1% under the age of 18, 7.2% from 18 to 24, 30.7% from 25 to 44, 26.5% from 45 to 64, and 9.5% who were 65 years of age or older. The median age was 38 years. For every 100 females, there were 104.5 males. For every 100 females age 18 and over, there were 106.4 males.

The median income for a household in the township was $38,125, and the median income for a family was $45,625. Males had a median income of $32,778 versus $22,431 for females. The per capita income for the township was $17,627. About 6.5% of families and 8.7% of the population were below the poverty line, including 9.9% of those under age 18 and 10.0% of those age 65 or over.
