= Pinconning River =

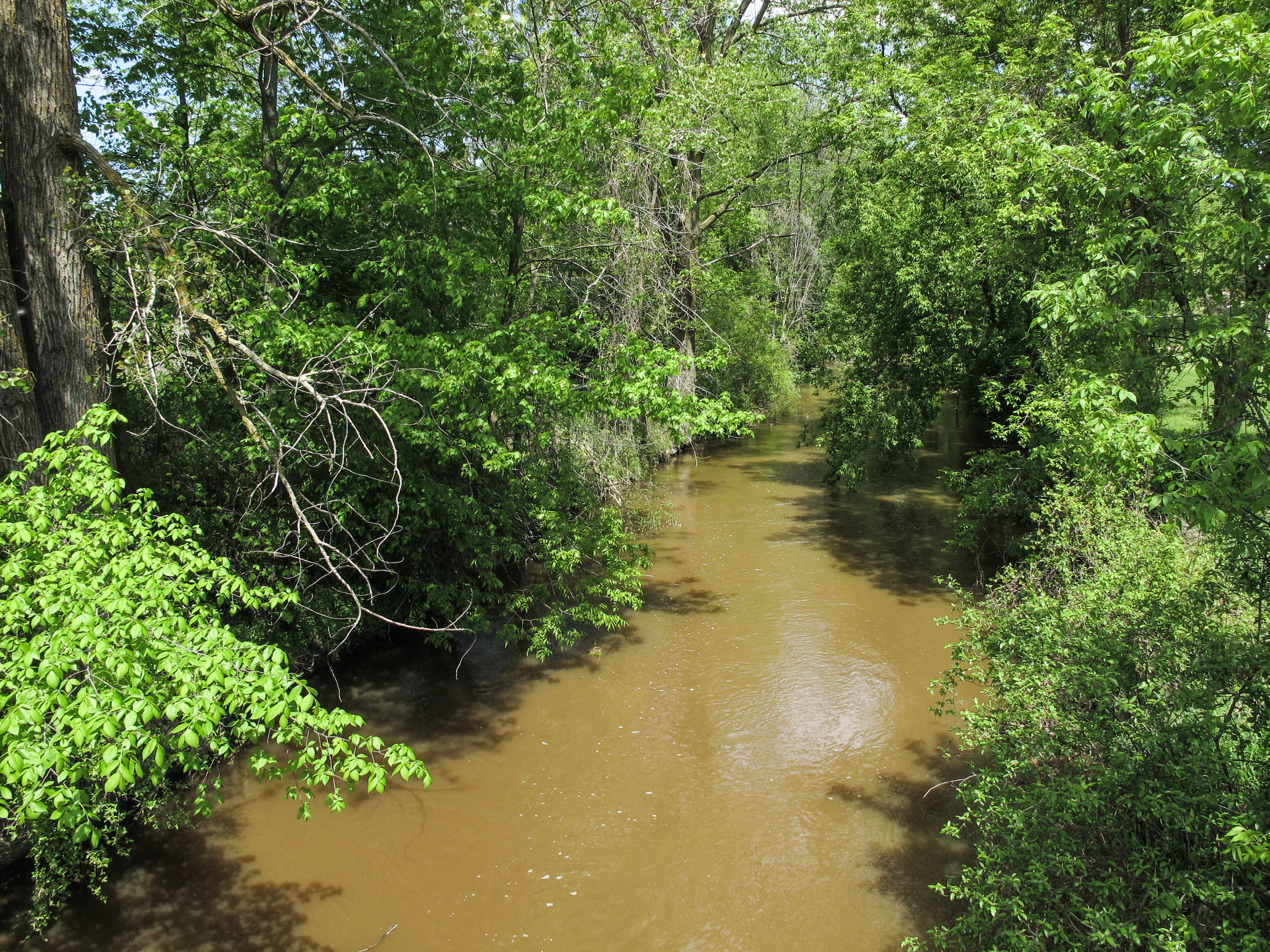
- The Pinconning River in Pinconning Township

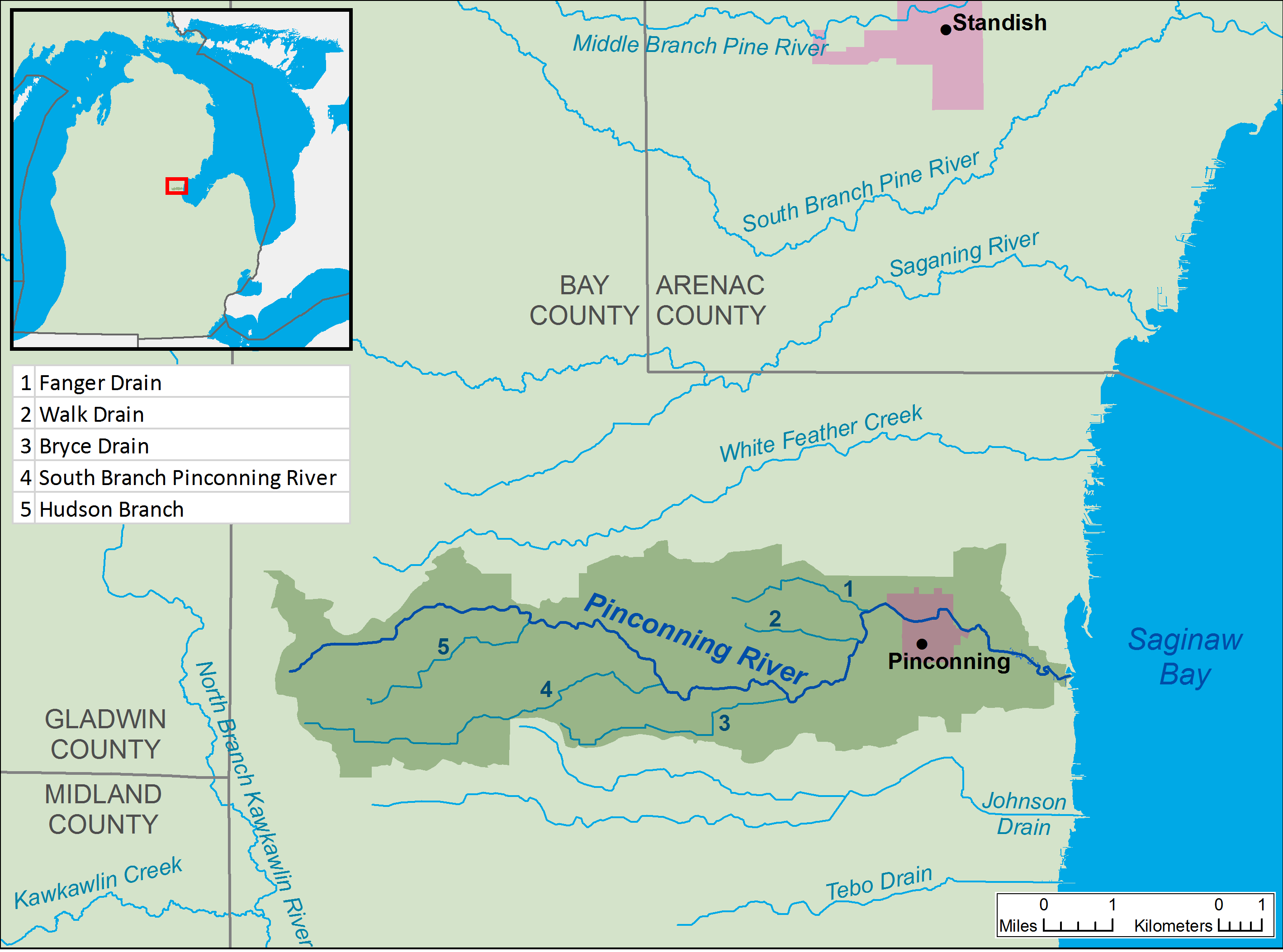
- A map of the Pinconning River and its watershed.
- Etymology: River at potatoing-grounds
- Native name: Opinikaakiing-ziibi (Ojibwe)

Location
- Country: United States
- State: Michigan
- County: Bay
- Townships: Mount Forest, Pinconning
- Municipality: Pinconning

Physical characteristics
- Source
  - location: Mount Forest Township
  - coordinates: 43.8483564°N 84.1497153°W
  - elevation: 679 ft (207 m)
- Mouth: Saginaw Bay
  - location: Pinconning Township
  - coordinates: 43.8469655°N 83.9208187°W
  - elevation: 577 ft (176 m)
- Length: 10.9 mi (17.5 km)
- Basin size: 26.6 sq mi (69 km^{2})

Basin features
- Hydrologic Unit Code: 040801020107 (USGS)

The Pinconning River (/ˌpɪnˈkɑːnɪŋ/ pin-KAHN-ing; Ojibwe Opinikaaning-ziibi (syncope as Pinkaaning-ziibi), "River at potatoing-grounds") is a small river on the central Lower Peninsula of Michigan in the United States. It is 15.6 miles (25.1 km) long and flows to Saginaw Bay of Lake Huron, draining an area of 26.6 square miles (69 km^{2}). Via Lake Huron and the Great Lakes system, it is part of the larger watershed of the St. Lawrence River.

The Pinconning River's course and watershed are entirely in northern Bay County. It begins in Mount Forest Township, approximately 9.4 miles (15.1 km) west of the city of Pinconning, and flows generally eastward, through Pinconning Township and Pinconning. It flows into Saginaw Bay in Pinconning Township, approximately 2.2 miles (3.5 km) east of Pinconning. Its largest tributary is the South Branch Pinconning River, which is 6.2 miles (10.0 km) long and flows into the Pinconning River upstream of Pinconning.

The Saginaw Bay Land Conservancy owns a nature preserve, the Pinconning Nature Preserve, along the river in Pinconning Township. Bay County operates a county park, Pinconning Park, on the north bank of the river at its mouth.

== Tributaries ==
This is a list of named streams in the Pinconning River's watershed, as identified by the National Hydrography Dataset. All are direct tributaries of the Pinconning River. By default, the list is ordered from the mouth of the river to its source.

	Name	Length
1	Fanger Drain	2.4 miles (3.9 km)
2	Walk Drain	1.8 miles (2.9 km)
3	Bryce Drain	4.1 miles (6.6 km)
4	South Branch Pinconning River	6.2 miles (10.0 km)
5	Hudson Branch	3.3 miles (5.3 km)

== See also ==
- List of rivers of Michigan
