= Pinconning cheese =

Type of semi-hard cheese

- Country of origin: United States
- Source of milk: cow's milk

Pinconning cheese is an aged semi-hard whole cow's milk, Colby-style cheese named after Pinconning, Michigan. It is made and distributed by a number of different companies including Pinconning Cheese Company and Wilson's (Horn) Cheese Shoppe in Pinconning, Michigan, and Williams Cheese in nearby Linwood, Michigan.

It is available as cheese curds and in mild or aged many years, to sharpness levels of medium mild, medium sharp, sharp, extra sharp, and super sharp (10 plus years old). Its hardness and texture change, and sharpness increases with aging. Pinconning cheese's flavor and texture are rich, creamy, and open. It is an unusual and different experience from eating traditional Colby cheese. It is often used as a replacement for Cheddar and Colby in dishes such as macaroni and soufflés."

In 2020, production was 70,000 pounds (32,000 kg).

It was developed and first produced by Daniel Horn in 1915 on a farm at the northeast corner of Mount Forest and Mackinaw Roads. The product is still based on the original family recipe and made and produced by companies related to the originator.

Pinconning was chosen as the 'Cheese Capital of Michigan' based on Pinconning cheese.
