= Hard Luck, Michigan =

- Ghost town
- Location within the state of Michigan Location within the United States
- Coordinates: 44°04′18″N 84°11′35″W
- Country: United States
- State: Michigan
- County: Gladwin
- Township: Grim
- Elevation: 764 ft (233 m)
- Time zone: UTC-5 (Eastern (EST))
  - Summer (DST): UTC-4 (EDT)
- GNIS feature ID: 1617608

Hard Luck is a ghost town in Gladwin County in the U.S. state of Michigan.

Hard Luck is located within Grim Township in the Au Sable State Forest about 14 mi (23 km) northeast of Gladwin.

The settlement was involved in the lumber trade.

It had a station along the Michigan Central Railroad and contained its own post office briefly from April 24, 1904 until August 31, 1906.
