= Pinconning Township, Michigan =

- Civil township
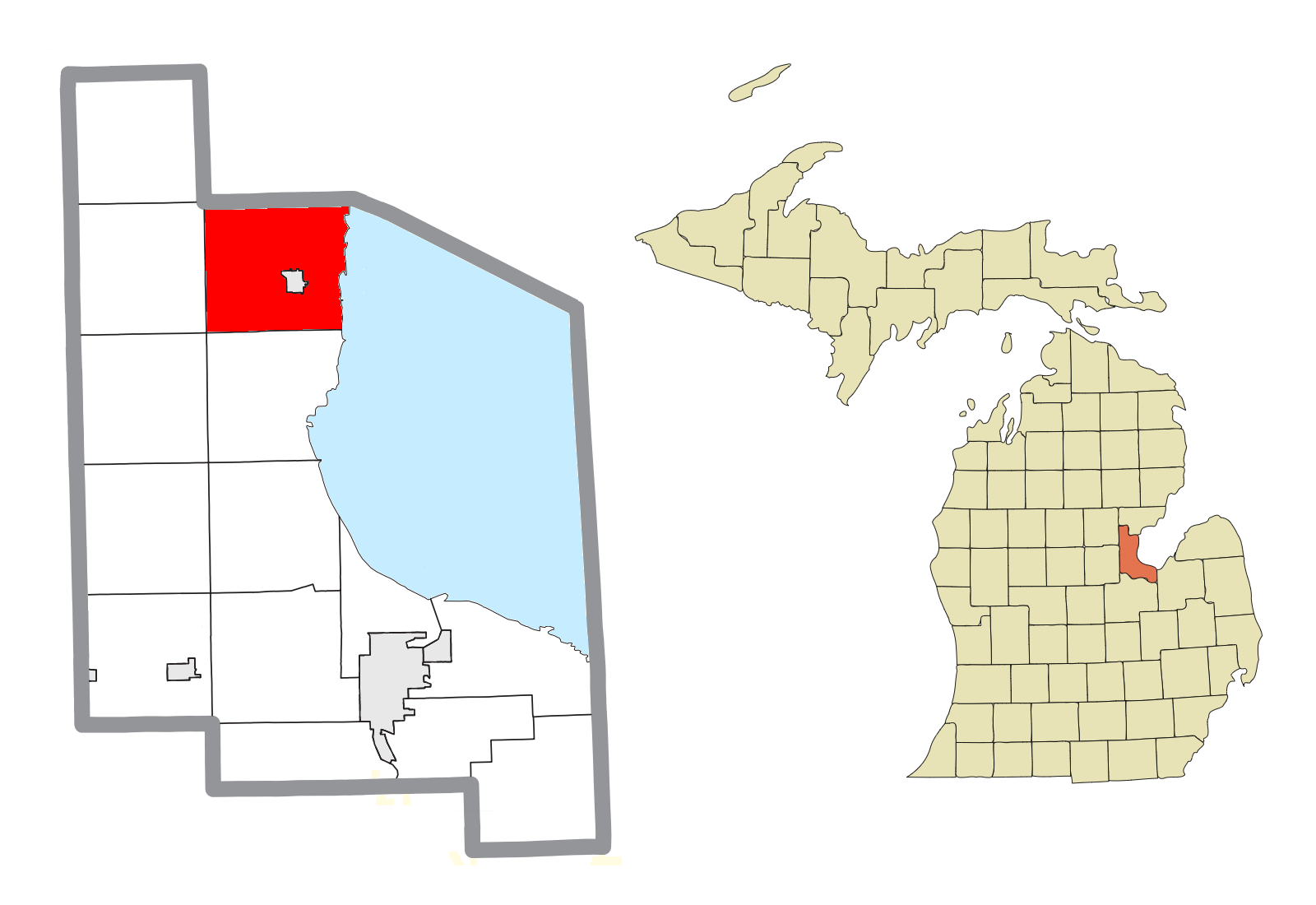
- Location within Bay County

- Location within the state of Michigan Pinconning Township (the United States)
- Coordinates: 43°51′57″N 83°57′52″W
- Country: United States
- State: Michigan
- County: Bay
- Established: 1873

Area
  - Total: 42.0 sq mi (108.7 km^{2})
  - Land: 36.7 sq mi (95.0 km^{2})
  - Water: 5.3 sq mi (13.7 km^{2})
- Elevation: 604 ft (184 m)

Population (2020)
  - Total: 2,299
  - Density: 62.7/sq mi (24.2/km^{2})
- Time zone: UTC-5 (Eastern (EST))
  - Summer (DST): UTC-4 (EDT)
- ZIP code(s): 48650 (Pinconning)
- Area code: 989
- FIPS code: 26-64180
- GNIS feature ID: 1626902
- Website: Official website

Pinconning Township (/ˌpɪnˈkɑːnɪŋ/ pin-KAHN-ing) is a civil township of Bay County in the U.S. state of Michigan. The township's population was 2,299 as of the 2020 census. It is included in the Bay City Metropolitan Statistical Area. Pinconning Township was organized on February 28, 1873. The city of Pinconning is surrounded by the township, but is administratively autonomous. The name "Pinconning" is said to come from the Native American word O-pin-nic-con-ing, meaning "potato place".

== Communities ==
- Woodville is an unincorporated community within the township at 7 Mile Road and Cody Estey Road west of Interstate 75. (Elevation: 627 ft./191 m.)

== History ==
The first post office in White Feather opened 14 October 1874 on Whitefeather Road just east of N Huron Road. The post office was closed for the first time on March 16, 1875. On May 24, 1875, the White Feather PO was reopened and operated until June 27, 1878. Reestablished for a third time, the White Feather PO reopened on November 10, 1879. The White Feather PO finally closed on June 14, 1881. White Feather was the last station on the Mackinaw Branch of the Michigan Central Railroad in Pinconning Township; Woodville was the last station on the Gladwin Branch.

== Geography ==
Pinconning Township is located in northern Bay County along the west shore of Lake Huron's Saginaw Bay. According to the United States Census Bureau, the township has a total area of 42.0 square miles (108.7 km^{2}), of which 36.7 square miles (95.0 km^{2}) is land and 5.3 square miles (13.7 km^{2}), or 12.63%, is water. The Pinconning River flows eastward through the southern part of the township.

== Demographics ==
As of the census of 2000, there were 2,608 people, 983 households, and 756 families residing in the township. The population density was 71.3 inhabitants per square mile (27.5/km^{2}). There were 1,055 housing units at an average density of 28.9 per square mile (11.2/km^{2}). The racial makeup of the township was 96.32% White, 0.88% Native American, 0.27% Asian, 1.04% from other races, and 1.50% from two or more races. Hispanic or Latino of any race were 1.88% of the population.

There were 983 households, out of which 32.6% had children under the age of 18 living with them, 65.2% were married couples living together, 7.1% had a female householder with no husband present, and 23.0% were non-families. 19.3% of all households were made up of individuals, and 8.6% had someone living alone who was 65 years of age or older. The average household size was 2.65 and the average family size was 3.04.

In the township the population was spread out, with 24.7% under the age of 18, 8.2% from 18 to 24, 27.5% from 25 to 44, 26.5% from 45 to 64, and 13.1% who were 65 years of age or older. The median age was 39 years. For every 100 females, there were 101.1 males. For every 100 females age 18 and over, there were 102.9 males.

The median income for a household in the township was $43,021, and the median income for a family was $52,237. Males had a median income of $40,000 versus $21,960 for females. The per capita income for the township was $19,163. About 6.4% of families and 7.9% of the population were below the poverty line, including 10.5% of those under age 18 and 13.2% of those age 65 or over.
