= Dow Diamond =

Minor League baseball stadium in Midland, Michigan

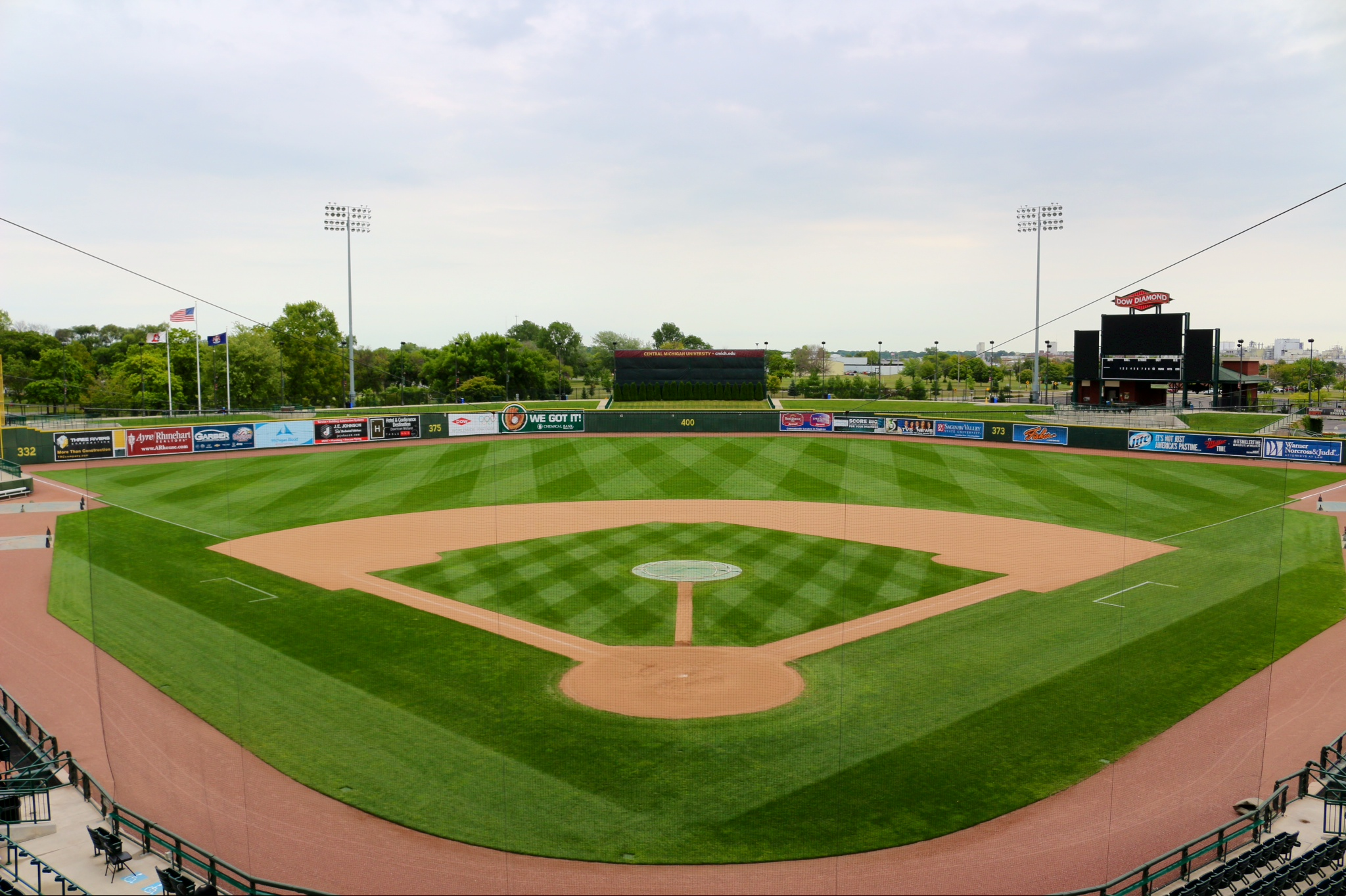
- View of field

- Location within Michigan Location within the United States
- Location: 825 East Main Street; Midland, Michigan 48640
- Coordinates: 43°36′33.01″N 84°14′12.13″W
- Owner: Michigan Baseball Foundation
- Operator: Michigan Baseball Foundation
- Capacity: 5,500 baseball 9,000 stage event
- Field size: Left Field: 332 ft (101 m); Left Center: 375 ft (114 m); Center Field: 400 ft (122 m); Right Center: 373 ft (114 m); Right Field: 325 ft (99 m); Wall: 9 to 13 ft (2.7 to 4.0 m)

Construction
- Groundbreaking: April 11, 2006
- Opened: April 13, 2007
- Cost: $33.5 million ($50 million in 2025 dollars)
- Architect: Populous
- Structural engineer: Thornton Tomasetti
- Services engineer: Henderson Engineers
- General contractor: Three Rivers Corporation

Tenant
- Great Lakes Loons (MWL) (2007–present)

Website
- www.milb.com/great-lakes/ballpark/dow-diamond

Dow Diamond is a Minor League baseball stadium located in Midland, Michigan. It is the home of the Great Lakes Loons of the Midwest League. The Loons are affiliated with the Los Angeles Dodgers.

The stadium is located near Buttles, Ellsworth and State streets in Midland. The Dow Chemical Company, whose world headquarters are in Midland, donated the land for the stadium and also purchased the naming rights to the facility in 2006. The stadium name is a reference to both Dow's logo (a red diamond) and that "diamond" is a slang term for a baseball field.

== History ==
Ground was broken for the ballpark on April 11, 2006. The park opened April 13, 2007 and on June 8, 2007 it was announced that Dow Diamond would host the 2008 Midwest League All Star Game, which was held on June 17, 2008. The venue also hosted the 2017 Midwest League All Star Game.

In 2007, Ballpark Digest recognized the Dow Diamond as the best ballpark of the year. In 2012, they were awarded best ballpark in Michigan from Stadium Journey. In 2016, they were ranked 16th out of 160 Minor League Baseball teams for stadium experience.

On May 16, 2023, a new stadium attendance record of 6,906 was set during a game against the West Michigan Whitecaps.

In January 2024, a LED field lighting system was installed increasing energy efficiency and providing enhanced player safety by offering higher visibility for players that reduces excessive direct light and glare. In addition, the new lighting system enhanced the fan experience with color changing capabilities synchronized to music for in-game moments like home runs and wins.

== Facility ==
The seating bowl can accommodate 3,100 persons, with an additional 100 on the party deck. The park features 12 luxury suites containing a total of 300 seats, a full-service bar in the suite level, two outdoor firepits, 168 solar panels and a 31' x 80' LED videoboard.

Dow Diamond is a year-round facility that can be rented for most any event and the facility's catering company can provide full food & beverage service for two dozen to a formal dinner for 200 or a reception for 2,000.

For outdoor non-baseball events, the stadium can provide seating for 3,500 with the stage behind home plate; 5,500 with the stage behind second base or 9,000 with the stage in center field.

For exhibitions or trade shows within the infield/outfield, 50,000 ft² of event deck portable flooring and/or 10,000 ft² of DD2 covering for stage areas & road builds is available.

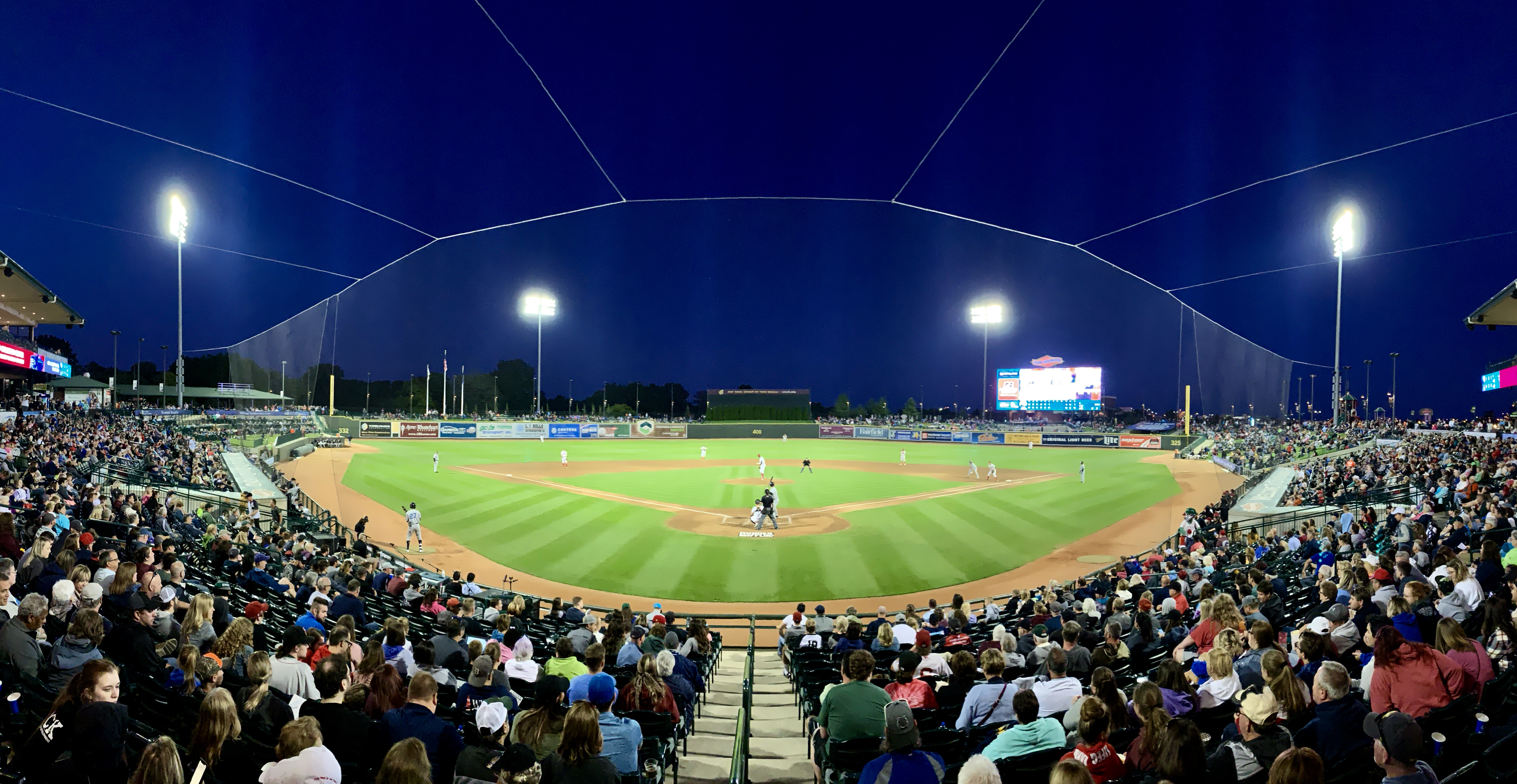
View of a then-Dow Diamond record crowd of 6,671 at a game on August 23, 2019.
