= Gibson Township, Michigan =

- Civil township
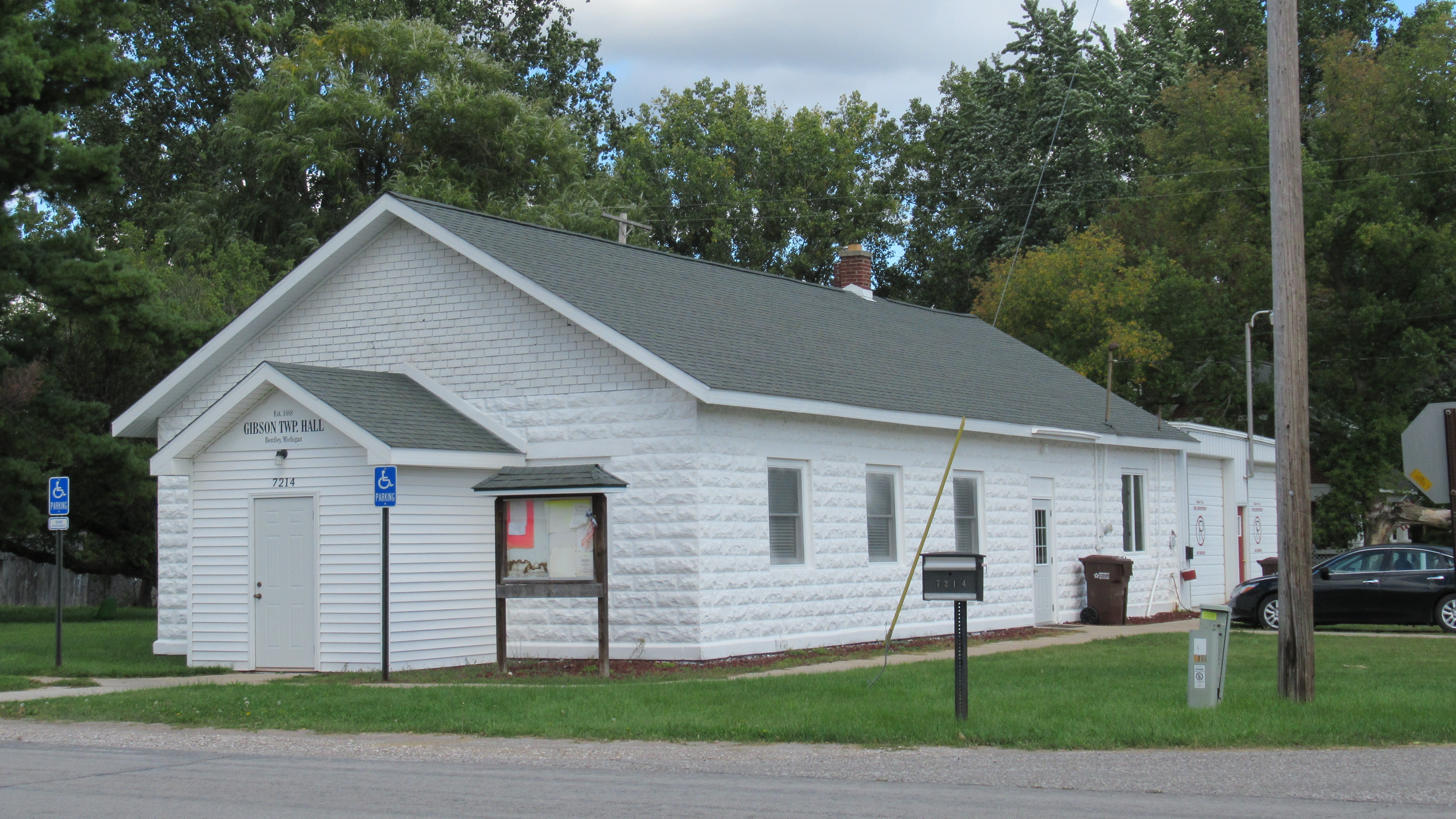
- Gibson Township Hall

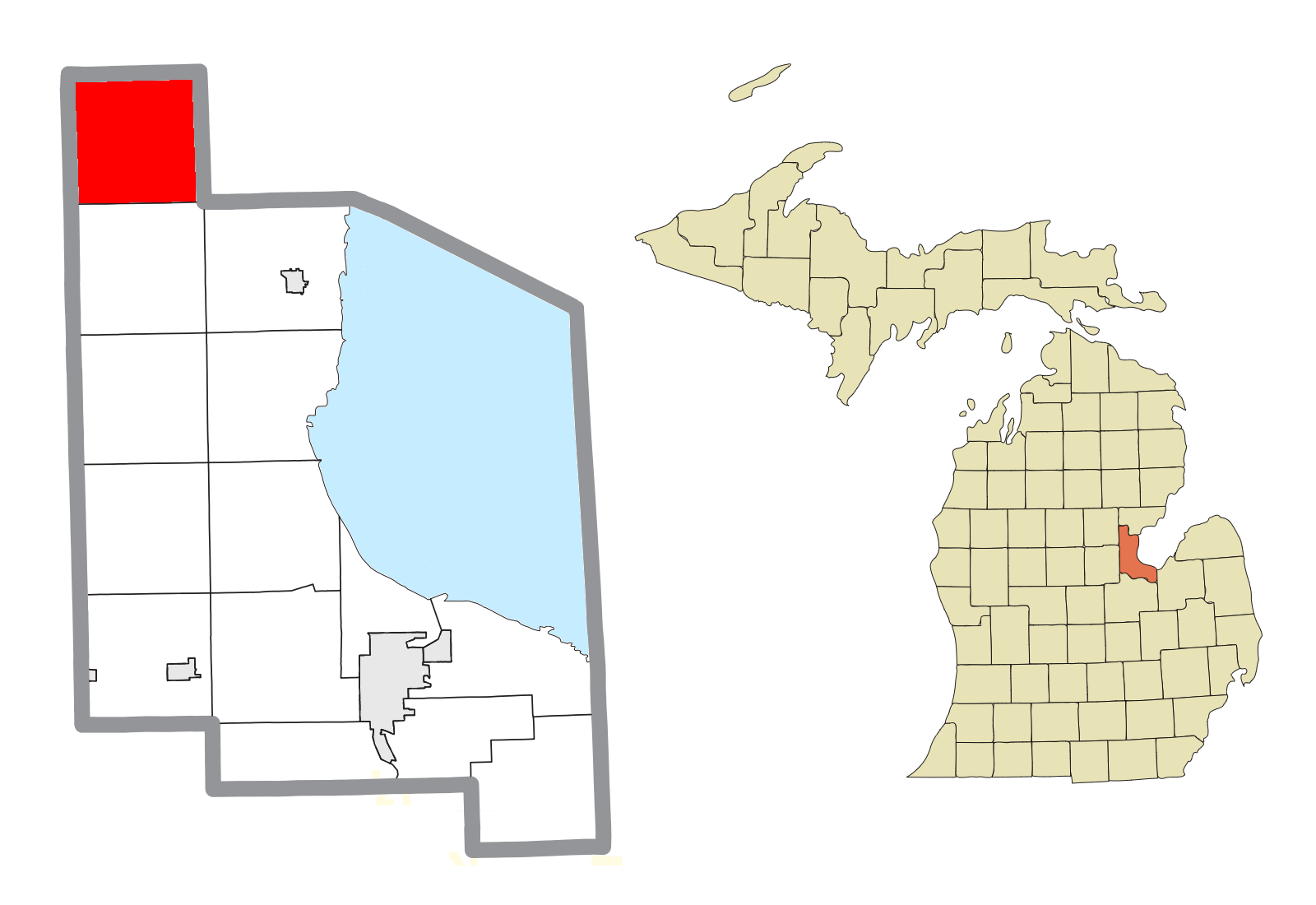
- Location within Bay County

- Location within the state of Michigan Gibson Township (the United States)
- Coordinates: 43°57′45″N 84°5′57″W
- Country: United States
- State: Michigan
- County: Bay
- Established: 1888

Area
  - Total: 35.6 sq mi (92.2 km^{2})
  - Land: 35.6 sq mi (92.1 km^{2})
  - Water: 0.039 sq mi (0.1 km^{2})
- Elevation: 702 ft (214 m)

Population (2020)
  - Total: 1,124
  - Density: 34/sq mi (13/km^{2})
- Time zone: UTC-5 (Eastern (EST))
  - Summer (DST): UTC-4 (EDT)
- ZIP code(s): 48613 (Bentley); 48658 (Standish); 48659 (Sterling)
- Area code: 989
- FIPS code: 26-32040
- GNIS feature ID: 1626350
- Website: https://www.gibsontownshipmi.com/

Gibson Township is a civil township of Bay County in the U.S. state of Michigan. The township's population was 1,124 as of the 2020 census. It is included in the Bay City Metropolitan Statistical Area.

== Communities ==
- Bentley is an unincorporated community in the township, situated at the intersection of Standish Road and Bentley Road. (43°56′53″N 84°08′04″W; Elevation: 738 ft./225 m.) The community was named after Oscar Bentley, the proprietor of a sawmill.

== History ==
A post office was opened on Feb 26, 1887, called Bently. A post office was opened on Stevenson Road just east of Standish Road on March 15, 1900, called Glover and operated for exactly five years. On June 30, 1909, the Bently post office was renamed Bentley.

== Geography ==
According to the United States Census Bureau, the township has a total area of 35.6 square miles (92.2 km^{2}), of which 0.04 square miles (0.1 km^{2}), or 0.13%, is water.

== Demographics ==
As of the census of 2000, there were 1,245 people, 398 households, and 312 families residing in the township. The population density was 34.9 inhabitants per square mile (13.5/km^{2}). There were 431 housing units at an average density of 12.1 per square mile (4.7/km^{2}). The racial makeup of the township was 98.80% White, 0.16% African American, 0.16% Native American, 0.16% from other races, and 0.72% from two or more races. Hispanic or Latino of any race were 9.96% of the population.

There were 398 households, out of which 36.7% had children under the age of 18 living with them, 65.3% were married couples living together, 8.3% had a female householder with no husband present, and 21.4% were non-families. 18.3% of all households were made up of individuals, and 6.5% had someone living alone who was 65 years of age or older. The average household size was 2.83 and the average family size was 3.21.

In the township the population was spread out, with 29.9% under the age of 18, 8.7% from 18 to 24, 29.2% from 25 to 44, 22.7% from 45 to 64, and 9.6% who were 65 years of age or older. The median age was 35 years. For every 100 females, there were 99.8 males. For every 100 females age 18 and over, there were 108.4 males.

The median income for a household in the township was $35,978, and the median income for a family was $39,500. Males had a median income of $29,750 versus $21,833 for females. The per capita income for the township was $14,969. About 9.0% of families and 12.5% of the population were below the poverty line, including 15.5% of those under age 18 and 9.1% of those age 65 or over.

== Climate ==
This climatic region is typified by large seasonal temperature differences, with warm to hot (and often humid) summers and cold (sometimes severely cold) winters. According to the Köppen Climate Classification system, Gibson Township has a humid continental climate, abbreviated "Dfb" on climate maps.
