= Pinconning, Michigan =

- City
- City of Pinconning
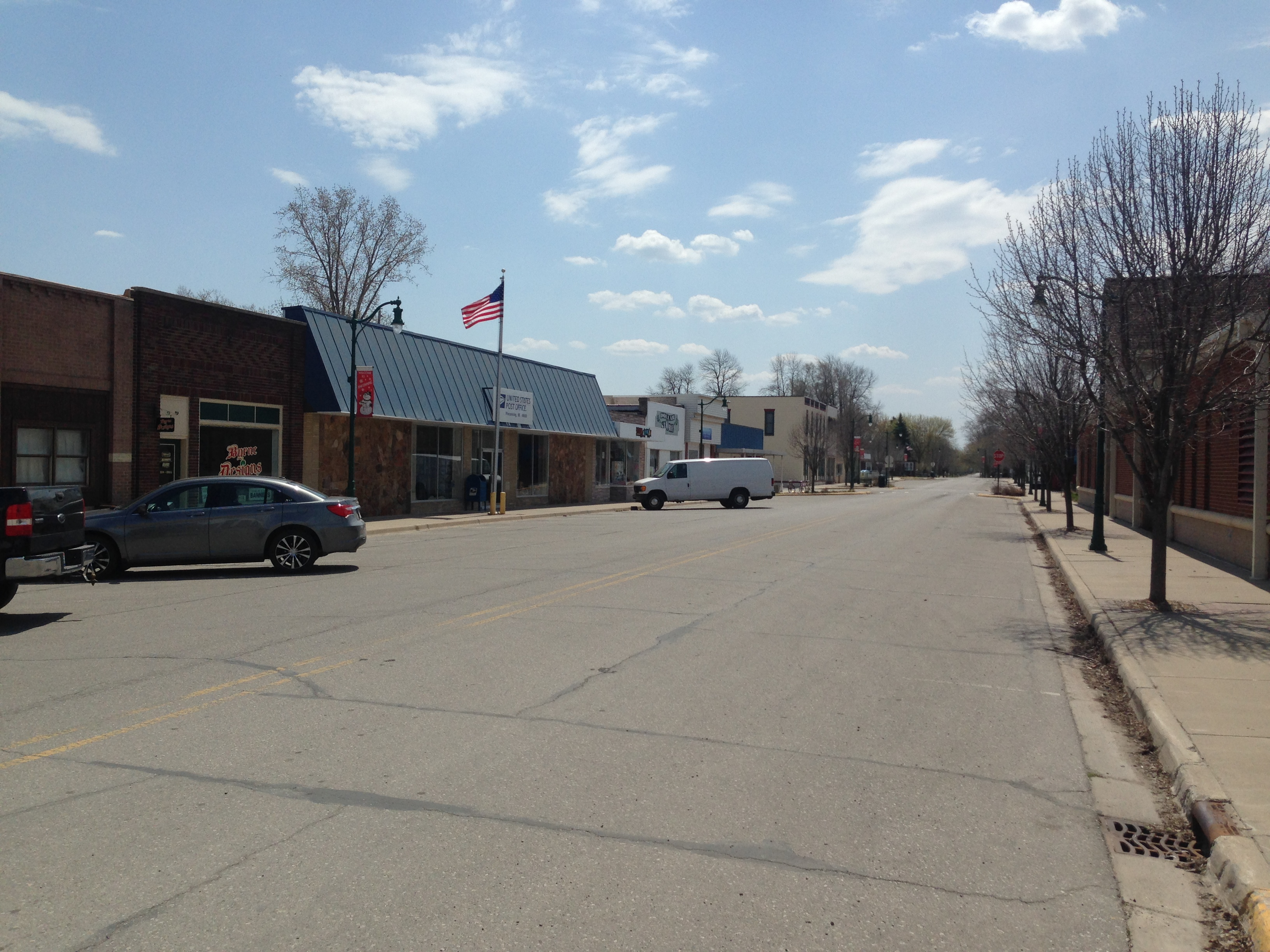
- Downtown Pinconning, along Kaiser Street
- Nicknames: Pinny, Cheesetown
- Motto: Cheese Capital of Michigan
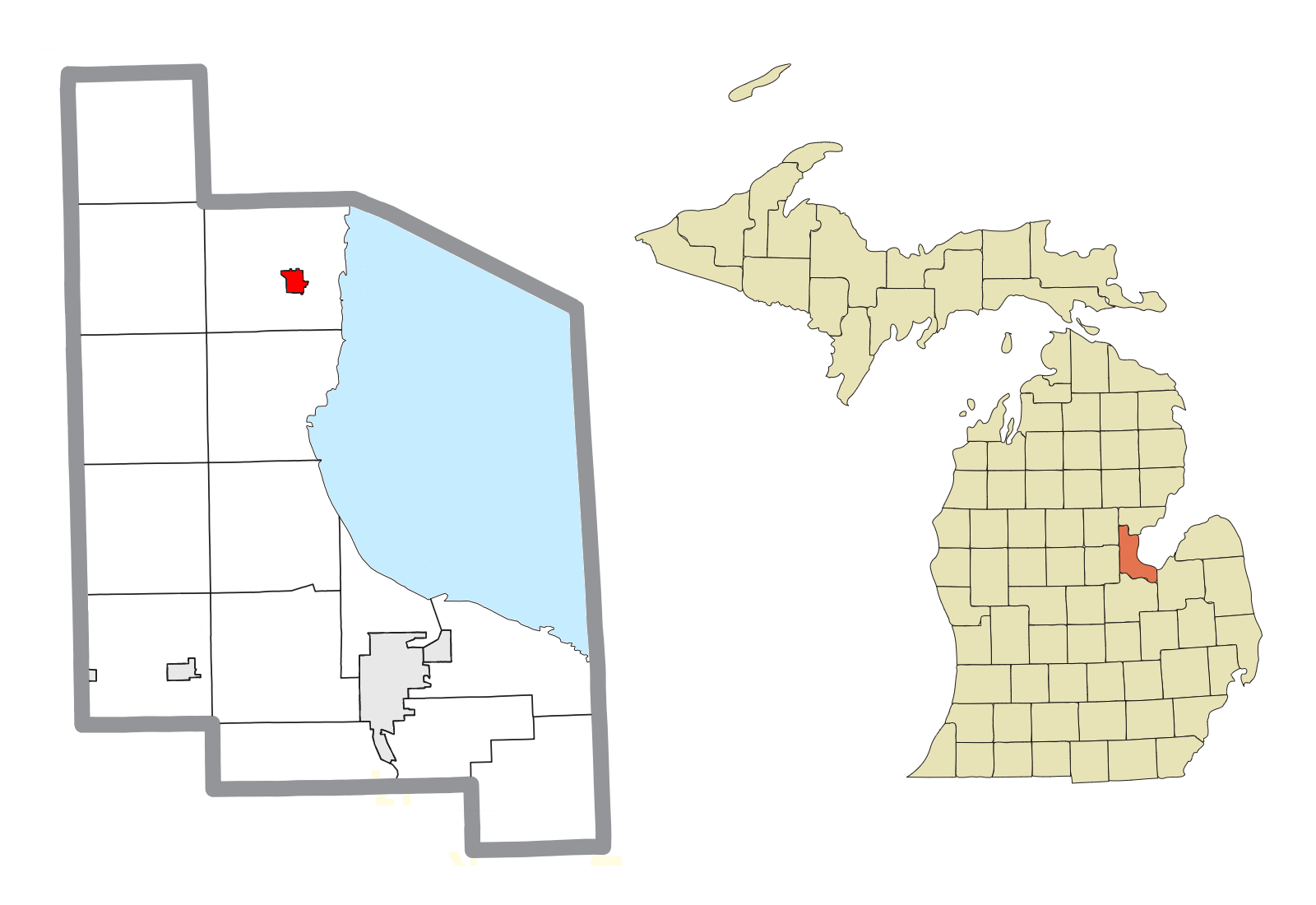
- Location within Bay County

- Location within the state of Michigan
- Coordinates: 43°51′18″N 83°57′47″W
- Country: United States
- State: Michigan
- County: Bay
- Incorporated: 1872 (village); 1935 (city)

Government
  - Type: Council–manager
  - Mayor: Sheri Boettcher
  - City manager: Rebecca Lakin

Area
  - Total: 0.86 sq mi (2.23 km^{2})
  - Land: 0.86 sq mi (2.23 km^{2})
  - Water: 0 sq mi (0.00 km^{2})
- Elevation: 600 ft (183 m)

Population (2020)
  - Total: 1,204
  - Density: 1,399.0/sq mi (540.17/km^{2})
- Time zone: UTC-5 (Eastern (EST))
  - Summer (DST): UTC-4 (EDT)
- ZIP code(s): 48650
- Area code: 989
- FIPS code: 26-64160
- GNIS feature ID: 0634899
- Website: cityofpinconning.org

Pinconning (/ˌpɪnˈkɑːnɪŋ/ pin-KAHN-ing) is a city in Bay County in the U.S. state of Michigan. The population was 1,204 at the 2020 census. It is included in the Saginaw, Midland, and Bay City metropolitan area. The city is locally noted for its former production of cheese and cheese products, especially Pinconning cheese.

== History ==
The name, "Pinconning," comes from the Ojibwe Opinikaaning (syncope as Pinkaaning; recorded as "o-pin-nic-con-ing"), which translates into English as, "potato place." The community is named after the Pinconning River, which flows through the community.

The town was first colonized in 1872 by George VanEtten and Henry Kaiser as a lumber settlement along the Pinconning River. The post office in Pinconning opened on January 29, 1873. In 1907 a man named William Reid moved to Pinconning, and started Pinconning Creamery. A gravel road between Pinconning and neighboring Standish was built in 1918, the same year the prohibition had taken effect.

== Geography ==
According to the United States Census Bureau, the city has a total area of 0.85 square miles (2.20 km^{2}), all land. The Pinconning River flows through the city. The city is located roughly 1.5 miles west of Saginaw Bay.

== Demographics ==
Historical population
Census	Pop.	Note	%±
1880	300		—
1890	885		195.0%
1900	729		−17.6%
1910	677		−7.1%
1920	769		13.6%
1930	826		7.4%
1940	1,027		24.3%
1950	1,223		19.1%
1960	1,329		8.7%
1970	1,320		−0.7%
1980	1,430		8.3%
1990	1,291		−9.7%
2000	1,386		7.4%
2010	1,307		−5.7%
2020	1,204		−7.9%
U.S. Decennial Census

=== 2010 census ===
As of the census of 2010, there were 1,307 people, 580 households, and 324 families living in the city. The population density was 1,537.6 inhabitants per square mile (593.7/km^{2}). There were 637 housing units at an average density of 749.4 per square mile (289.3/km^{2}). The racial makeup of the city was 96.5% White, 0.7% African American, 0.2% Native American, 0.3% Asian, 0.3% from other races, and 2.1% from two or more races. Hispanic or Latino of any race were 3.6% of the population.

There were 580 households, of which 31.0% had children under the age of 18 living with them, 33.6% were married couples living together, 16.6% had a female householder with no husband present, 5.7% had a male householder with no wife present, and 44.1% were non-families. 38.1% of all households were made up of individuals, and 18.2% had someone living alone who was 65 years of age or older. The average household size was 2.24 and the average family size was 2.99.

The median age in the city was 37.1 years. 25.4% of residents were under the age of 18; 9.9% were between the ages of 18 and 24; 23.9% were from 25 to 44; 24.7% were from 45 to 64; and 16.1% were 65 years of age or older. The gender makeup of the city was 47.3% male and 52.7% female.

=== 2000 census ===
As of the census of 2000, there were 1,386 people, 609 households, and 356 families living in the city. The population density was 1,594.9 inhabitants per square mile (615.8/km^{2}). There were 645 housing units at an average density of 742.2 per square mile (286.6/km^{2}). The racial makeup of the city was 97.40% White, 0.07% African American, 0.94% Native American, 0.07% Asian, 0.43% from other races, and 1.08% from two or more races. Hispanic or Latino of any race were 3.25% of the population.

There were 609 households, out of which 29.4% had children under the age of 18 living with them, 39.2% were married couples living together, 14.9% had a female householder with no husband present, and 41.5% were non-families. 36.0% of all households were made up of individuals, and 19.7% had someone living alone who was 65 years of age or older. The average household size was 2.26 and the average family size was 2.93.

In the city, the population was spread out, with 24.8% under the age of 18, 10.6% from 18 to 24, 26.8% from 25 to 44, 19.7% from 45 to 64, and 18.1% who were 65 years of age or older. The median age was 36 years. For every 100 females, there were 87.0 males. For every 100 females age 18 and over, there were 81.5 males.

The median income for a household in the city was $27,188, and the median income for a family was $33,646. Males had a median income of $32,344 versus $21,250 for females. The per capita income for the city was $16,210. About 15.0% of families and 15.9% of the population were below the poverty line, including 20.9% of those under age 18 and 8.8% of those age 65 or over.

== Transportation ==
=== Bus ===
- Indian Trails provides daily intercity bus service between St. Ignace and Bay City, Michigan.

=== Highways ===
- M-13 passes directly through Pinconning, and I-75 is only three miles from the heart of the city.

== Education ==
Pinconning Area School District operates public schools serving Pinconning.

Bay County Library System includes the public library in Pinconning.

== See also ==
- A 1947 Kaiser K100 Special Sedan is known as a "Pinconning Special" and one is located at the National Automobile Museum, in Reno, Nevada.
