= Michigan's 35th Senate district =

American legislative district

Michigan's 35th State Senate district
Senator
Chedrick Greene; D–Saginaw
- Demographics: 74.2% White; 12.1% Black; 8% Hispanic; 1.5% Asian; 0.1% Native American; 0.1% Hawaiian/Pacific Islander; 0.3% Other; 3.6% Multiracial
- Population (2024): 268,851

Michigan's 35th Senate district is one of 38 districts in the Michigan Senate. The 35th district was created with the adoption of the 1963 Michigan Constitution, as the previous 1908 state constitution only permitted 34 senatorial districts. It is currently represented by Democrat Chedrick Greene, who was sworn in following a special election in May 2026.

== Geography ==
District 35 encompasses parts of Bay, Midland, and Saginaw counties.

=== 2011 Apportionment Plan ===
District 35, as dictated by the 2011 Apportionment Plan, covered a large swath of Northern Michigan, which included all of Benzie, Crawford, Kalkaska, Lake, Leelanau, Manistee, Mason, Missaukee, Ogemaw, Osceola, Roscommon, and Wexford Counties. Communities within the district included Cadillac, Ludington, Manistee, Frankfort, Grayling, Kalkaska, Baldwin, Greilickville, Scottville, Lake City, West Branch, Reed City, Evart, Houghton Lake, St. Helen, and Roscommon.

The district overlapped with Michigan's 1st, 2nd, and 4th congressional districts, and with the 97th, 100th, 101st, 102nd, and 103rd districts of the Michigan House of Representatives.

== List of senators ==
Senator	Party	Dates	Residence	Notes
Robert L. Richardson Jr.	Republican	1965–1974	Saginaw	
Robert D. Young	Republican	1975–1982	Saginaw	
John Engler	Republican	1983–1990	Mount Pleasant	
Joanne G. Emmons	Republican	1991–1994	Big Rapids	
Bill Schuette	Republican	1995–2002	Midland	
Michelle McManus	Republican	2003–2010	Lake Leelanau	
Darwin L. Booher	Republican	2011–2018	Evart	
Curt VanderWall	Republican	2019–2022	Ludington	
Kristen McDonald Rivet	Democratic	2023–2025	Bay City	Resigned.
Chedrick Greene	Democratic	2026–present	Saginaw	Elected in special election.

== Recent election results ==
=== 2020s ===
2026 Michigan Senate election
Primary election
Party	Candidate	Votes	%
General election
Democratic	Chedrick Greene (incumbent)	68,280	55.57
Republican	Jason Tunney	52,768	42.95
U.S. Taxpayers'	Laurie Atwood	1,825	1.49
Total votes		122,873	100
Democratic hold			

2026 special general election, District 35
Party	Candidate	Votes	%
Democratic	Chedrick Greene	36,575	58.9
Republican	Jason Tunney	24,491	39.4
Libertarian	Ali Sledz	1,058	1.7
Total votes		62,124	100
Democratic hold			

2022 Michigan Senate election, District 35
Primary election
Party	Candidate	Votes	%
Republican	Annette Glenn	12,360	40.5
Republican	Tim Kelly	6,815	22.3
Republican	Christian Velasquez	5,867	19.2
Republican	Martin Blank	5,460	17.9
Total votes		30,502	100
General election
Democratic	Kristen McDonald Rivet	62,105	53.4
Republican	Annette Glenn	54,246	46.6
Total votes		116,351	100
Democratic gain from Republican			

=== 2018 ===
2018 Michigan Senate election, District 35
Primary election
Party	Candidate	Votes	%
Republican	Curt VanderWall	19,713	48.9
Republican	Bruce Rendon	9,832	24.4
Republican	Ray Franz	9,424	23.4
Republican	Cary Urka	1,307	3.2
Total votes		40,276	100
General election
Republican	Curt VanderWall	73,688	63.2
Democratic	Mike Taillard	39,923	34.2
Libertarian	Timothy Coon	3,031	2.6
Total votes		116,642	100
Republican hold			

=== 2014 ===
2014 Michigan Senate election, District 35
Party	Candidate	Votes	%
Republican	Darwin Booher (incumbent)	51,299	59.5
Democratic	Glenn Lottie	34,872	40.5
Total votes		86,171	100
Republican hold			

=== Federal and statewide results ===
Year	Office	Results
2020	President	Trump 62.5 – 36.0%
2018	Senate	James 58.1 – 39.4%
2018	Governor	Schuette 56.7 – 39.9%
2016	President	Trump 61.3 – 33.5%
2014	Senate	Land 48.7 – 46.5%
2014	Governor	Snyder 55.0 – 42.0%
2012	President	Romney 53.9 – 45.0%
2012	Senate	Stabenow 51.6 – 44.9%

== Historical district boundaries ==
Map	Description	Apportionment Plan	Notes
	Alcona County; Arenac County; Bay County (part); Auburn; Beaver Township; Fraser Township; Garfield Township; Gibson Township; Kawkawlin Township; Merritt Township; Mount Forest Township; Pinconning; Pinconning Township; Williams Township; Gladwin County; Iosco County; Midland County; Ogemaw County; Oscoda County; Saginaw County (part); Albee Township; Birch Run Township; Blumfield Township; Brady Township; Brant Township; Bridgeport Township; Chapin Township; Chesaning Township; Frankenmuth; Frankenmuth Township; Fremont Township; James Township; Jonesfield Township; Lakefield Township; Maple Grove Township; Marion Township; Richland Township; Saginaw Township; St. Charles Township; Spaulding Township; Swan Creek Township; Taymouth Township; Thomas Township; Tittabawassee Township; Tuscola County (part); Arbela Township; Denmark Township; Tuscola Township	1964 Apportionment Plan	
	Arenac County; Bay County (part); Midland; Gladwin County; Gratiot County (part); Acarda Township; Bethany Township; Emerson Township; Hamilton Township; Ithaca; Lafayette Township; North Star Township; St. Louis; Wheeler Township; Iosco County (part); Burleigh Township; Plainfield Township; Reno Township; Whittemore; Midland County; Ogemaw County; Roscommon County; Saginaw County (part); Albee Township; Birch Run Township; Blumfield Township; Brady Township; Brant Township; Bridgeport Township; Chapin Township; Chesaning Township; Frankenmuth; Frankenmuth Township; Fremont Township; James Township; Jonesfield Township; Lakefield Township; Maple Grove Township; Marion Township; Richland Township; Saginaw (part); Saginaw Township; St. Charles Township; Spaulding Township; Swan Creek Township; Taymouth Township; Thomas Township; Tittabawassee Township	1972 Apportionment Plan	
	Clare County; Gratiot County; Isabella County; Mecosta County; Midland County; Osceola County	1982 Apportionment Plan	
	Clare County; Gladwin County; Lake County; Mason County; Midland County; Newaygo County; Oceana County; Osceola County	1992 Apportionment Plan	
	Benzie County; Clare County; Kalkaska County; Lake County; Leelanau County; Manistee County; Mecosta County; Missaukee County; Osceola County; Roscommon County; Wexford County	2001 Apportionment Plan	
	Benzie County; Crawford County; Kalkaska County; Lake County; Leelanau County; Manistee County; Mason County; Missaukee County; Ogemaw County; Osceola County; Roscommon County; Wexford County	2011 Apportionment Plan	
