= Karen McDonald =

Karen McDonald may refer to:

- Karen McDonald (Coronation Street), fictional character
- Karen McDonald (politician) (born 1970), American lawyer and politician in Michigan
