= 2026 Michigan Attorney General election =

- November 3, 2026

Nominee	Eli Savit	Doug Lloyd
Party	Democratic	Republican
Popular vote	2,471,974	2,103,208
Percentage	52.54%	44.70%
- Savit: 40–50% 50–60% 60–70% 70–80% Lloyd: 40–50% 50–60% 60–70% 70–80%
Attorney General before election
Dana Nessel
Democratic
Elected Attorney General
Eli Savit
Democratic

The 2026 Michigan Attorney General election took place on November 3, 2026, to elect the attorney general of Michigan. Democratic incumbent Dana Nessel was term-limited and ineligible to seek a third term. The major-party nominees were nominated at conventions in August 2026. Democratic Washtenaw County prosecuting attorney Eli Savit defeated Republican Eaton County prosecuting attorney Doug Lloyd in the general election.

== Democratic convention ==
=== Candidates ===
==== Nominee ====
- Eli Savit, Washtenaw County prosecuting attorney (2021–present)

==== Eliminated at convention ====
- William Noakes, public defender

==== Withdrawn ====
- Karen McDonald, Oakland County Prosecuting Attorney (2021–present)
- Mark Totten, former U.S. Attorney for the Western District of Michigan (2022–2025) and nominee for attorney general in 2014

=== Endorsements ===
Eli Savit

U.S. representatives

- Andy Levin, former MI-9 (2019–2023)

State legislators

- Stephanie Chang, SD-3 (2019–present)
- Kara Hope, HD-74 (2019–present)
- Henry Yanez, Sterling Heights city councilor (2019–present) and former HD-25 (2013–2019)
- Stephanie Young, HD-16 (2021–present)
- 14 other state legislators

Local officials

- David LaGrand, mayor of Grand Rapids (2025–present)
- 29 other city and county officials

Party officials

- Lavora Barnes, former chair of the Michigan Democratic Party (2019–2025)

Labor unions

- LiUNA Michigan (previously endorsed McDonald)
- Michigan AFL-CIO (previously endorsed McDonald)
- Michigan Education Association (previously endorsed McDonald)
- Michigan Nurses Association
- SEIU Michigan (previously endorsed McDonald)
- United Auto Workers (previously endorsed McDonald)

Organizations

- Democratic Attorneys General Association
- Equality Michigan
- Giffords
- Jane Fonda Climate PAC
- Michigan Democratic Party Black Caucus
- Reproductive Freedom for All

Political parties

- Michigan Democratic Party

Newspapers

- The Michigan Daily
Karen McDonald (withdrawn)

Executive branch officials

- James J. Blanchard, former U.S. ambassador to Canada (1993–1996) and former governor of Michigan (1983–1991)

U.S. representatives

- Kristen McDonald Rivet, MI-8 (2025–present) (candidate's sister)

State legislators

- Rosemary Bayer, SD-13 (2019–present)
- Winnie Brinks, Senate majority leader (2023–present) from SD-29 (2019–present)
- Brenda Carter, HD-53 (2019–present)
- Amos O'Neal, HD-94 (2021–present)

Labor unions

- American Federation of Teachers Michigan
- ~~Michigan AFL-CIO~~ (endorsed Savit after withdrawal)
- ~~LiUNA Michigan~~ (endorsed Savit after withdrawal)
- ~~Michigan Education Association~~ (endorsed Savit after withdrawal)
- Michigan Professional Fire Fighters
- ~~SEIU Michigan~~ (endorsed Savit after withdrawal)
- UA Plumbers Local 98
- ~~United Auto Workers~~ (endorsed Savit after withdrawal)
- United Food and Commercial Workers Local 876

Organizations

- EMILYs List
- Michigan Democratic Party LGBT&A Caucus
Mark Totten (withdrawn)

U.S. representatives

- Mark Schauer, former MI-7 (2009–2011) and nominee for governor in 2014

State legislators

- Joe Tate, former speaker of the Michigan House of Representatives (2023–2025) from the 9th district (2019–present)

Local officials

- Jerry Clayton, former Washtenaw County Sheriff (2009–2025)
- Sheldon Neeley, mayor of Flint (2019–present)
- Andy Schor, mayor of Lansing (2018–present)

=== Fundraising ===
Italics indicate a withdrawn candidate

Campaign finance reports as of August 13, 2026
Candidate	Raised	Spent	Cash on hand
Karen McDonald (D)	$1,613,095 (Note: $100,000 of this total was transferred from McDonald's prosecutor campaign fund)	$1,598,385	$14,709
Eli Savit (D)	$1,632,903	$606,072	$1,026,830
Mark Totten (D)	$330,479 (Note: $89,490 of this total has been self-funded by Totten)	$243,613	$87,472
Source: Michigan Secretary of State

== Republican convention ==
=== Candidates ===
==== Nominee ====
- Doug Lloyd, Eaton County prosecuting attorney (2013–present)

==== Eliminated at convention ====
- Kevin Kijewski, defense attorney and former superintendent of Catholic schools in the Archdiocese of Detroit

==== Not at convention ====
- Matthew DePerno, lawyer and nominee for attorney general in 2022

=== Endorsements ===
Doug Lloyd

Statewide officials

- Mike Cox, former attorney general of Michigan (2003–2011)

Local officials

- 52 county prosecutors

Political parties

- Michigan Republican Party

=== Fundraising ===
Campaign finance reports as of August 6, 2026
Candidate	Raised	Spent	Cash on hand
Kevin Kijewski (R)	$107,786 (Note: $69,308 of this total has been self-funded by Kijewski)	$98,948	$8,837
Doug Lloyd (R)	$486,534 (Note: $15,525 of this total was transferred from Lloyd's prosecutor campaign fund, and an additional $200 has been self-funded by Lloyd himself)	$261,170	$225,289
Source: Michigan Secretary of State

== Third-party candidates ==
=== Libertarian Party ===
==== Nominee ====
- Jason Dye

=== Green Party ===
==== Nominee ====
- Jeff Polonowski

=== U.S. Taxpayers Party ===
==== Nominee ====
- John Perry Ludtke Jr.

=== Natural Law Party ===
==== Nominee ====
- Doug Dern

== General election ==
=== Predictions ===
Source	Ranking	As of
Sabato's Crystal Ball	Tossup	August 21, 2025

=== Post-convention endorsements ===
Doug Lloyd (R)

Organizations

- Detroit Regional Chamber PAC
Eli Savit (D)

Statewide officials

- Gretchen Whitmer, governor of Michigan (2019–present)

Organizations

- End Citizens United
- Everytown for Gun Safety

Newspapers

- Detroit Free Press

=== Fundraising ===
Campaign finance reports as of October 18, 2026
Candidate	Raised	Spent	Cash on hand
Doug Lloyd (R)	$1,197,244	$963,560	$233,609
Eli Savit (D)	$2,344,675	$1,983,071	$361,604
Source: Michigan Secretary of State

=== Polling ===
Poll source	Date(s) administered	Sample size (Note: Key: A – all adults RV – registered voters LV – likely voters V – unclear)	Margin of error	Eli Savit (D)	Doug Lloyd (R)	Undecided
Global Strategy Group (D) (Note: DGA)	September 27 – October 1, 2026	TBA	± 3.5%	47%	44%	—
Cygnal (R)/Beacon Research (D) (Note: Poll sponsored by Michigan Enjoyer)	September 18–21, 2026	600 (LV)	± 4.0%	39%	37%	24%
Glengariff Group (Note: Poll sponsored by The Detroit News and WDIV-TV)	August 31 – September 3, 2026	600 (LV)	± 4.0%	36%	35%	29%

Hypothetical polling

Karen McDonald vs. Matt DePerno

Poll source	Date(s) administered	Sample size	Margin of error	Karen McDonald (D)	Matt DePerno (R)	Undecided
Public Policy Polling (D) (Note: Poll sponsored by McDonald's campaign)	November 28–30, 2025	631 (LV)	± 3.9%	44%	37%	19%

Karen McDonald vs. Kevin Kijewski

Poll source	Date(s) administered	Sample size	Margin of error	Karen McDonald (D)	Kevin Kijewski (R)	Undecided
Public Policy Polling (D)	November 28–30, 2025	631 (LV)	± 3.9%	42%	37%	21%

Eli Savit vs. Matt DePerno

Poll source	Date(s) administered	Sample size	Margin of error	Eli Savit (D)	Matt DePerno (R)	Undecided
Public Policy Polling (D)	November 28–30, 2025	631 (LV)	± 3.9%	40%	37%	23%

Eli Savit vs. Kevin Kijewski

Poll source	Date(s) administered	Sample size	Margin of error	Eli Savit (D)	Kevin Kijewski (R)	Undecided
Public Policy Polling (D)	November 28–30, 2025	631 (LV)	± 3.9%	38%	38%	24%

Mark Totten vs. Matt DePerno

Poll source	Date(s) administered	Sample size	Margin of error	Mark Totten (D)	Matt DePerno (R)	Undecided
Public Policy Polling (D)	November 28–30, 2025	631 (LV)	± 3.9%	39%	36%	25%

Mark Totten vs. Kevin Kijewski

Poll source	Date(s) administered	Sample size	Margin of error	Mark Totten (D)	Kevin Kijewski (R)	Undecided
Public Policy Polling (D)	November 28–30, 2025	631 (LV)	± 3.9%	38%	37%	25%

=== Results ===
2026 Michigan Attorney General election
Party	Candidate	Votes	%	±%
Democratic	Eli Savit	2,471,974	52.54	
Republican	Doug Lloyd	2,103,208	44.70	
Libertarian	Jason Dye	58,678	1.25	
U.S. Taxpayers	John Perry Ludtke Jr.	32,129	0.68	
Green	Jeff Polonowski	25,157	0.53	
Natural Law	Doug Dern	14,096	0.30	
Total votes		4,705,242	100.0	
Democratic hold				

== See also ==
- 2026 United States elections
- 2026 Michigan elections

== Notes ==
Partisan clients
