= Improving Medicare Post-Acute Care Transformation Act of 2014 =

American proposed legislation

- Long title: To amend title XVIII of the Social Security Act to provide for standardized post-acute care assessment data for quality, payment, and discharge planning, and for other purposes.
- Acronyms (colloquial): IMPACT Act of 2014
- Announced in: the 113th United States Congress
- Sponsored by: Rep. Dave Camp (R, MI-4)
- Number of co-sponsors: 7

Codification
- U.S.C. sections affected: 42 U.S.C. § 1395 et seq., 42 U.S.C. § 1395ww, 42 U.S.C. § 1395i, 42 U.S.C. § 1395t, 42 U.S.C. § 1395i–4, and others.
- Agencies affected: Centers for Medicare and Medicaid Services, United States Congress, Office of Assistant Secretary for Planning and Evaluation, Department of Health and Human Services, Medicare Payment Advisory Commission

Legislative history
- Introduced in the House as H.R. 4994 by Rep. Dave Camp (R, MI-4) on June 26, 2014; Committee consideration by United States House Committee on Ways and Means, United States House Committee on Energy and Commerce; Passed the House on September 16, 2014 (voice vote)

The Improving Medicare Post-Acute Care Transformation Act of 2014 or IMPACT Act of 2014 (H.R. 4994) is a bill that is intended to change and improve Medicare's post-acute care (PAC) services and how they are reported.

The bill was introduced into the United States House of Representatives during the 113th United States Congress.

== Background ==
Under the current Medicare system, patients can get post-acute care, care after surgery or a stroke for example, from four different places: "a skilled nursing facility (SNF), a hospital-based inpatient rehabilitation facility (IRF), a long-term care hospital (LTCH), or from a home health agency." Each organization has its own set of complicated rules, procedures, and costs.

== Provisions of the bill ==
This summary is based largely on the summary provided by the Congressional Research Service, a public domain source.

The Improving Medicare Post-Acute Care Transformation Act of 2014 or the IMPACT Act of 2014 would amend title XVIII (Medicare) of the Social Security Act to direct the United States Secretary of Health and Human Services (HHS) to: (1) require post-acute care (PAC) providers to report standardized patient assessment data, data on quality measures, and data on resource use and other measures; (2) require the data to be interoperable to allow for its exchange among PAC and other providers to give them access to longitudinal information so as to facilitate coordinated care and improve Medicare beneficiary outcomes; and (3) modify PAC assessment instruments applicable to PAC providers for the submission of standardized patient assessment data on such providers and enable assessment data comparison across all such providers.

The bill would direct the Secretary to: (1) provide confidential feedback reports to PAC providers on their performance with respect to required measures; and (2) arrange for public reporting of PAC provider performance on quality, resource use, and other measures.

The bill would direct the Medicare Payment Advisory Commission (MEDPAC) to: (1) evaluate and recommend to Congress features of PAC payment systems that establish, or a unified PAC payment system that establishes, payment rates according to characteristics of individuals instead of according to the PAC setting where the Medicare beneficiary involved is treated; and (2) recommend to Congress a technical prototype for a PAC prospective payment system.

The bill would direct the Secretary to reduce by 2% the update to the market basket percentage for skilled nursing facilities which do not report assessment and quality data.

The bill would direct the Secretary to study: (1) the effect of individuals' socioeconomic status on quality, resource use, and other measures for individuals under the Medicare program; and (2) the impact on such measures of specified risk factors.

== Congressional Budget Office report ==
This summary is based largely on the summary provided by the Congressional Budget Office, a public domain source.

The legislation would increase direct spending by appropriating $222 million over the 2015-2024 period for activities related to survey and certification requirements for hospices and for the development and use of standardized assessment and quality data for post-acute services furnished to Medicare beneficiaries. The legislation would authorize the Secretary of Health and Human Services to spend $195 million in 2020 or subsequent years to increase payment rates for services furnished in the fee-for-service sector.

The legislation also would reduce direct spending by reducing Medicare's payment rates for services furnished by skilled nursing facilities that do not report assessment and quality data and by reducing the caps on payments for beneficiaries receiving hospice services.

== Procedural history ==
The Improving Medicare Post-Acute Care Transformation Act of 2014 was introduced into the United States House of Representatives on June 26, 2014, by Rep. Dave Camp (R, MI-4). The bill was referred to the United States House Committee on Ways and Means and the United States House Committee on Energy and Commerce. On September 16, 2014, the House voted to pass the bill in a voice vote.

== Debate and discussion ==
A bipartisan, bicameral draft of the bill was first released on March 18, 2014, when legislators sought comment from stakeholders and "experts within the health care community to further improve the legislative draft." The bill's sponsors said that "the resounding theme across the more than 70 letters received was the need for standardized post-acute assessment data across Medicare PAC provider settings."

== See also ==
- List of bills in the 113th United States Congress
