= Promoting Adoption and Legal Guardianship for Children in Foster Care Act =

- Long title: To reauthorize and restructure the adoption incentives grant program, and for other purposes.
- Announced in: the 113th United States Congress
- Sponsored by: Rep. Dave Camp (R, MI-4)
- Number of co-sponsors: 3

Codification
- Acts affected: Social Security Act, Internal Revenue Code of 1986
- U.S.C. sections affected: 42 U.S.C. § 673b, 42 U.S.C. § 673, 42 U.S.C. § 503, 42 U.S.C. § 627
- Agencies affected: Department of Health and Human Services
- Authorizations of appropriations: $679,000,000

Legislative history
- Introduced in the House as H.R. 3205 by Rep. Dave Camp (R, MI-4) on September 27, 2013; Committee consideration by United States House Committee on Ways and Means; Passed the House on October 22, 2013 (Roll Call Vote 552: 402–0)

The Promoting Adoption and Legal Guardianship for Children in Foster Care Act (H.R. 3205) is a bill that would extend and modify an existing grant program. States use the grants to match up families who want to adopt children with kids who are in foster care. The bill was introduced in the United States House of Representatives during the 113th United States Congress.

== Provisions of the bill ==
The Adoption Incentives program is found in Section 473A of the Social Security Act. This program would be reauthorized and modified by the Promoting Adoption and Legal Guardianship for Children in Foster Care Act. The bill would reauthorize the program for three years. It would also change the method used to calculate whether a state received a grant. Under existing law, states are rewarded by the raw number of adoptions they facilitate. The Promoting Adoption and Legal Guardianship for Children in Foster Care Act would change this to measure the adoption rate instead, to "ensure that state receive awards even while cost care caseloads continue to decline."

== Procedural history ==
=== House ===
The Promoting Adoption and Legal Guardianship for Children in Foster Care Act was introduced into the House on September 27, 2013 by Rep. Dave Camp (R, MI-4). It was referred to the United States House Committee on Ways and Means. On October 17, 2013, House Majority Leader Eric Cantor announced that H.R. 2083 was scheduled for a vote under a suspension of the rules on October 22, 2013. The House passed the bill on October 22, 2013 in Roll Call Vote 552 by a vote of 402–0.

== Debate and discussion ==
The bill was considered to be nonpartisan. Newspaper The Hill said that this bill and three others from the week of October 21, 2013, would give the House "a chance to practice the long-forgotten art of working together." This was a reference to the contentious United States federal government shutdown of 2013, which ended the previous week.

== See also ==
- List of bills in the 113th United States Congress
- Adoption in the United States
