= Philip Potvin =

American politician

Philip N. Potvin

Member of the Michigan House of Representatives from the 102nd district
- In office January 1, 2011 – December 31, 2016
- Preceded by: Darwin L. Booher
- Succeeded by: Michele Hoitenga

Personal details
- Born: November 7, 1946 (age 79) Alpena, Michigan, U.S.
- Party: Republican
- Spouse: Jan
- Children: 4
- Education: Albion College (BA); Central Michigan University (MBA)
- Occupation: Politician
- Committees: Chairman, Appropriations Subcommittee on Agriculture and Rural Development
- Website: http://www.repphilpotvin.com

Military service
- Allegiance: United States
- Branch/service: Michigan National Guard
- Rank: Second lieutenant

Phil Potvin (born November 7, 1946) is a former member of the Michigan House of Representatives, first elected in 2010 and re-elected to a second term in 2012. His district consisted of Wexford, Mecosta, and western Osceola Counties.

Potvin was the chief executive officer of Western Concrete Products Company, and board chairman and executive committee member of the National Concrete Masonry Association. He also served as a second lieutenant in the Michigan National Guard.

== Illegal Waste Dumping ==
In 1996, Potvin was cited by Michigan's Department of Environmental Quality (DEQ) for the illegal dumping of several hundred gallons of toxic materials into an old elevator pit by Cadillac's branch of Western Concrete Products Company. The clean-up effort ranged from 1998 until its termination in 2002 and cost the company $162,500 in fines.

== Community ==
An Eagle Scout, Potvin remained involved in the Boy Scouts of America as an adult, serving on the executive board member of the Scenic Trails Boy Scout Council and as assistant scoutmaster for Boy Scout Troop 125 in Cadillac.

Potvin is a board member of Ducks Unlimited, and a member of Quality Deer Management, the Michigan Farm Bureau, and Right to Life of Michigan.
