= Al Cederberg =

American politician (1918–2006)

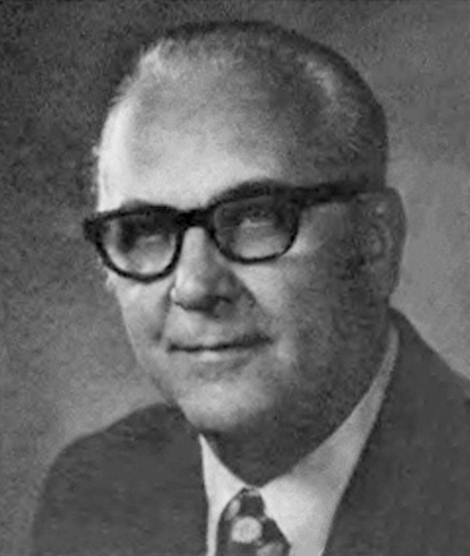

Member of the U.S. House of Representatives from Michigan's 10th district
- In office January 3, 1953 – December 31, 1978
- Preceded by: Roy O. Woodruff
- Succeeded by: Donald J. Albosta

Personal details
- Born: Elford Albin Cederberg; March 6, 1918 Bay City, Michigan, U.S.
- Died: April 17, 2006 (aged 88) The Villages, Florida, U.S.
- Resting place: Elm Lawn Cemetery
- Party: Republican
- Education: Bay City Junior College

Elford Albin "Al" Cederberg (March 6, 1918 – April 17, 2006) was an American politician and veteran of World War II. From 1953 to 1978, he served 13 terms in the U.S. House of Representatives, representing Michigan.

== Biography ==
Cederberg was born to dairy farmers Albin and Helen (Olson) Cederberg in Bay City, Michigan; his father and maternal grandparents were immigrants from Sweden. He attended public schools and Bay City Junior College from 1935 to 1937.

=== World War II ===
He entered the United States Army in April 1941, was commissioned as second lieutenant in July 1942, became a captain in 1943, and was assigned to the 83rd Infantry Division. He participated in the Normandy invasion, and fought in France and Germany during World War II. He was decorated with five campaign battle stars and the Bronze Star.

=== Later career ===
After the war, he was manager of Nelson Manufacturing Company of Bay City from 1946 to 1952, and was mayor of Bay City from 1949 to 1953.

=== Congress ===
In 1950, Cederberg unsuccessfully challenged incumbent Roy O. Woodruff in the Republican Party primary election for the U.S. House of Representatives in Michigan's 10th congressional district. Woodruff did not seek the nomination in 1952 and Cederberg won the Republican primary. He went on to win the general election to the 83rd Congress and was subsequently re-elected to the twelve succeeding Congresses, serving from January 3, 1953, until his resignation December 31, 1978. Cederberg voted in favor of the Civil Rights Acts of 1957, 1960, 1964, and 1968, as well as the 24th Amendment to the U.S. Constitution and the Voting Rights Act of 1965. He became the ranking minority member of the House Appropriations Committee. He was an unsuccessful candidate for reelection in 1978 to the 96th Congress, losing to Democrat Donald J. Albosta.

== Personal life ==
After the end of his term in Congress, Cederberg lived in Alexandria, Virginia and was a consultant for United Technologies, RCA, and Grumman Aircraft. He moved to Florida in the late 1990s.

=== Death ===
Cederberg died of heart and kidney ailments in The Villages, Florida at the age of 88 and was interred in Elm Lawn Cemetery of Bay City. He was survived by two children from his first marriage; Tom Cederberg and Marilyn Warner. His first marriage to Arlene Munro Cederberg (1916–2001) ended in divorce. His second wife, Marguerite Kletchka Cederberg, whom he married in 1958, died in March 2006.

U.S. House of Representatives
Preceded by Roy O. Woodruff	United States Representative for the 10th congressional district of Michigan; 1953 – 1978	Succeeded by Donald J. Albosta
Preceded by Charles R. Jonas	Ranking Member of the House Appropriations Committee; 1973 – 1978	Succeeded by Silvio O. Conte
