= Michele Hoitenga =

American politician (born 1969)

Member of the Michigan Senate from the 36th district
- Incumbent
- Assumed office January 1, 2023
- Preceded by: Jim Stamas

Member of the Michigan House of Representatives from the 102nd district
- In office January 1, 2017 – December 31, 2022
- Preceded by: Philip Potvin
- Succeeded by: Curt VanderWall

Personal details
- Born: July 26, 1969 (age 56) Cadillac, Michigan
- Party: Republican
- Spouse: Phillip Hoitenga
- Children: 2
- Occupation: Energy consultant, politician

Michele Hoitenga (born July 26, 1969) is an American politician and energy consultant from Michigan. Hoitenga serves as a Republican member of the Michigan Senate, where she represents the 36th district. Hoitenga served as a member of the Michigan House of Representatives from the District 102 from 2017 to 2022.

== Early life ==
Hoitenga graduated from Buckley High School.

== Education ==
Hoitenga graduated with a degree in Human Services from Baker College.

== Career ==
Hoitenga is a former Legislative assistant in Michigan. Hoitenga is an energy consultant.

In 2013, Hoitenga became the mayor of Manton, Michigan until 2016.

On November 8, 2016, Hoitenga won the election and became a Republican member of Michigan House of Representatives for District 102. Hoitenga defeated Douglas Gabert with 69.05% of the votes. On November 6, 2018, as an incumbent, Hoitenga won the election, and continued serving District 102. Hoitenga defeated Dion Adams with 67.77% of the votes. Hoitenga is the chair person of the Communications and Technology Committee.

In 2022, Hoitenga was elected to the Michigan Senate.

== Personal life ==
Hoitenga's husband is Phillip Hoitenga, oil and gas consultant. They have two children. Hoitenga and her family live in Manton, Michigan.

== See also ==
- 2016 Michigan House of Representatives election
- 2018 Michigan House of Representatives election
