= Curt VanderWall =

American politician

Member of the Michigan House of Representatives from the 102nd district
- Incumbent
- Assumed office January 1, 2023
- Preceded by: Michele Hoitenga

Member of the Michigan Senate from the 35th district
- In office January 1, 2019 – December 31, 2022
- Preceded by: Darwin L. Booher
- Succeeded by: Kristen McDonald Rivet

Personal details
- Born: November 3, 1961 (age 64) Grand Rapids, Michigan, U.S.
- Party: Republican

Curt VanderWall (born November 3, 1961) is an American politician who has served in the Michigan House of Representatives from the 102nd district since 2023.

== Political career ==
VanderWall served in the Michigan House of Representatives from the 101st district from 2017 to 2018 and in the Michigan State Senate from the 35th district from 2019 to 2022.

In 2022, VanderWall successfully ran for the 102nd district in the Michigan House of Representatives. He was reelected in 2024.
