= Robert D. Young (politician) =

American politician

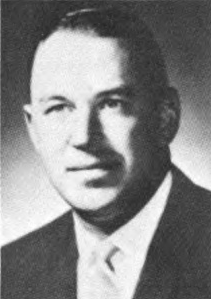

Member of the Michigan Senate from the 35th district
- In office January 1, 1975 – December 31, 1982
- Preceded by: Robert L. Richardson Jr.
- Succeeded by: John Engler

Member of the Michigan House of Representatives
- In office January 1, 1971 – December 31, 1974
- Preceded by: Harry E. Rohlfs
- Succeeded by: Donald J. Albosta
- Constituency: 84th district (1971–1972); 86th district (1973–1974)

Personal details
- Born: March 7, 1934 Spaulding Township, Michigan, US
- Died: October 4, 2013 (aged 79)
- Resting place: Oakwood Cemetery, Saginaw, Michigan
- Party: Republican
- Spouse: Shirley
- Education: Michigan State University
- Profession: Farmer, builder

Robert D. Young (March 7, 1934 – October 4, 2013) was a Republican member of both houses of the Michigan Legislature from 1971 through 1982.

After graduating from Michigan State University, Young returned to his farm in Saginaw. After one term each as Spaulding Township Supervisor and as a member of the Saginaw County Board of Commissioners, Young was elected to the Michigan House of Representatives in 1970, serving two terms. Young won election to the Michigan Senate in 1974, again serving two terms.

Redistricting after the 1980 Census put Young in the same Senate district—the 14th—as Senator Jerome T. Hart who defeated him for re-election in 1982. After he left the Legislature, Young became executive vice president of the Great Lakes Sugarbeet Growers Association, a role he held until his retirement in 1996.

Young was a Freemason and a member of the Shriners, Jaycees, and the Farm Bureau.

Young died on October 4, 2013, aged 79, from complications from an infection in the blood stream. He is buried in Oakwood Cemetery in Saginaw.

Michigan House of Representatives
Preceded by Harry E. Rohlfs	Member of the Michigan House of Representatives from the 84th district 1971–1972	Succeeded by Loren S. Armbruster
Preceded by Bert C. Brennan	Member of the Michigan House of Representatives from the 86th district 1973–1974	Succeeded by Donald J. Albosta
Michigan Senate
Preceded by Robert L. Richardson Jr	Member of the Michigan Senate from the 35th district 1975–1982	Succeeded by John Engler
