= Chedrick Greene =

American politician

Member of the Michigan Senate from the 35th district
- Incumbent
- Assumed office May 21, 2026
- Preceded by: Kristen McDonald Rivet

Personal details
- Born: November 1975 (age 50) Saginaw, Michigan
- Party: Democratic
- Education: Northwood University

Military service
- Branch/service: United States Marine Corps Reserve
- Years of service: 1994-2024
- Rank: Sergeant Major

Chedrick Greene is an American politician who is a member of the Michigan Senate, representing the 35th district which encompasses parts of Bay, Midland, and Saginaw counties. He was described by Katherine Dailey of Michigan Advance as a moderate Democrat.

== Earlier career ==
Greene is a Marine veteran and was a Saginaw fire captain. He had previously run for the Saginaw Public Schools Board of Education but withdrew from that race after being deployed to Southeast Asia. In addition to his role as fire captain, Greene was the department's community relations liaison.

Governor Gretchen Whitmer appointed Greene to the Statewide Housing Partnership in 2023, an advisory body of the Michigan State Housing Development Authority.

== Michigan Senate ==
Following the election of then-state senator Kristen McDonald Rivet to the U.S. House of Representatives, Rivet resigned her seat in the Michigan Senate. Greene ran in a special election to succeed her and received Rivet's endorsement. On February 3, 2026, Greene defeated president of the Michigan State Board of Education Pamela Pugh in the Democratic primary, receiving 68.5% of the vote.

In May 2026, Greene defeated Republican attorney Jason Tunney, receiving 58.9% of the vote. Greene won by 19.5% in a district that Kamala Harris, a fellow Democrat, won by less than one point in the 2024 presidential election. Greene was sworn in on May 21.
