= Michelle McManus (politician) =

American politician (born 1966)

Michelle A. McManus Honorable

Member of the Michigan Senate from the 35th district
- In office January 1, 2003 – December 31, 2010
- Preceded by: Bill Schuette
- Succeeded by: Darwin L. Booher

Member of the Michigan House of Representatives from the 104th district
- In office January 1, 1993 – December 31, 1998
- Preceded by: Thomas G. Power
- Succeeded by: Jason Allen

Personal details
- Born: October 5, 1966 (age 59) Traverse City, Michigan
- Party: Republican
- Spouse: Keith Nelson

Michelle A. McManus (born October 5, 1966) is a Republican politician from the U.S. state of Michigan. She was a member of the Michigan Senate from 2003 through 2010, representing the 35th district, and was assistant majority leader during her second term, 2007 to 2010.

== Elected office ==
From 1993 to 1999, she was a member of the Michigan House of Representatives from the 104th District.

McManus unsuccessfully ran for Congress in 1998 against then-Democratic incumbent Bart Stupak in Michigan's First Congressional District receiving only 40% of the vote. She served as the director of Governor John Engler's Northern Michigan Office between 1999 and 2002.

In the 2002 general election, McManus was elected to the Michigan Senate from the 35th Senate District. The district covered eleven counties, including Benzie, Clare, Kalkaska, Lake, Leelanau, Manistee, Mecosta, Missaukee, Osceola, Roscommon and Wexford. Her uncle, George A. McManus, Jr., had previously held the Senate seat for the 35th District.

In 2003, as a State Senator, McManus introduced Senate Bill Nos. 395, which would have made partial birth abortion illegal in the State of Michigan. The bill passed both houses and was enrolled as the "Legal Birth Definition Act". After the bill was vetoed by Governor Jennifer Granholm, Republicans decided to use the initiative petition system provided by the constitution, rather than attempt to override the governor's veto in the legislature. McManus joined with the Right to Life of Michigan, collected almost half a million signatures, and the new "Legal Birth Definition Act" was again passed by a majority of both houses, and became law in June 2004. However, it was subsequently found to be unconstitutional.

As a member of the Michigan Legislative Sportsmen Caucus, she sponsored bills that created an apprentice hunting programs. She was also involved in a legislative attempt to ban internet hunting, which is a remote-controlled version of hunting in which a person controls a gun over the internet with their mouse.

McManus was elected to a second term in 2007, but left the Senate in 2010 due to term limits and was succeeded in the Michigan Senate by Darwin Booher. In 2010 McManus sought the Republican nomination for secretary of state, but lost at the Republican Convention to Ruth Johnson, the Oakland County Clerk.

== Personal life ==
She has lived for her entire life in Northern Michigan and attended Traverse City public schools. In 1989, she graduated from Central Michigan University with a Bachelor of Science in Political Science.

She lives with her husband, Keith Nelson, and their son in Lake Leelanau.

== Title ==
As a former member of both houses of the Michigan Legislature, McManus is entitled to the courtesy title of The Honorable (abbreviated to Hon. or Hon'ble) for life.
