= Eli Savit =

American lawyer, law professor, and politician

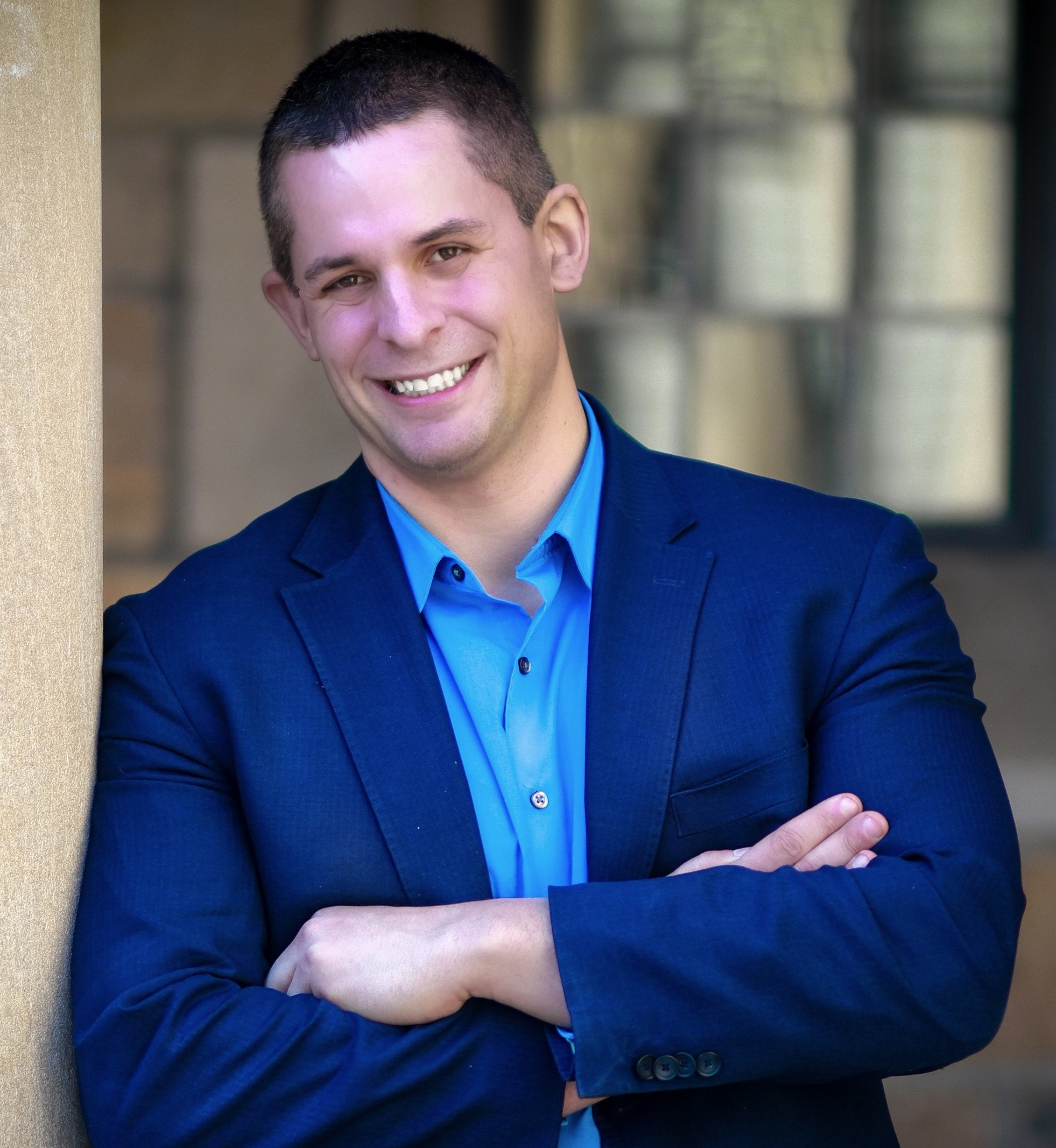
- Savit in 2020

Attorney General-elect of Michigan
- Assuming office January 1, 2027
- Succeeding: Dana Nessel

Prosecuting Attorney of Washtenaw County
- Incumbent
- Assumed office January 2, 2021
- Preceded by: Brian Mackie

Personal details
- Born: Eli Noam Savit; 1982 or 1983 (age 43–44) Ann Arbor, Michigan, U.S.
- Party: Democratic
- Education: Kalamazoo College (BA); Pace University (MS); University of Michigan (JD)
- Website: Campaign website

Eli Noam Savit is an American lawyer, professor, and politician serving as the prosecuting attorney of Washtenaw County, Michigan, since 2021. A member of the Democratic Party, Savit is the attorney general-elect following the 2026 election. He previously served as senior legal counsel in the office of Detroit Mayor Mike Duggan, and as a law clerk to Supreme Court Justices Sandra Day O'Connor and Ruth Bader Ginsburg. Savit is also a lecturer at the University of Michigan Law School. His work experience includes civil rights, education law, environmental protection, state and local government, and criminal-justice reform.

== Early life and education ==
Savit was born and raised in Ann Arbor, Michigan. He is Jewish. He attended Kalamazoo College, and was chosen as the senior class commencement speaker. Following graduation, Savit worked as an eighth-grade social studies teacher. He then attended law school at the University of Michigan, where he graduated magna cum laude and served as the Book Review Editor on the Michigan Law Review.

== Legal career ==
After graduating from law school, Savit worked as a law clerk for Judge Carlos T. Bea on the United States Court of Appeals for the Ninth Circuit, and for Judge David S. Tatel on the United States Court of Appeals for the D.C. Circuit. He then worked as a litigator at Williams & Connolly in Washington, D.C., before being selected to work as a law clerk on the United States Supreme Court for Justices Sandra Day O'Connor (ret.) and Ruth Bader Ginsburg.

After completing his Supreme Court clerkship, Savit returned to Michigan to work as an associate at the Detroit office of the Jones Day law firm. Following Jones Day, he accepted an appointment as senior legal counsel in the Detroit Mayor's Office. In that capacity, Savit participated in public-interest lawsuits against financial institutions and businesses, including suits against tax-delinquent corporate landlords and the opioid industry. Savit filed an amicus brief on behalf of the City in Gary B. v. Snyder, a successful lawsuit which sought to establish that Detroit schoolchildren have been denied their fundamental right to literacy. He participated in negotiations that ultimately led to a settlement in that case.

In his role as senior legal counsel, Savit led several criminal justice reform initiatives and was education advisor to the mayor. He also led the negotiating team that, in 2017, struck a $48 million community benefits agreement with the Canadian government related to the Gordie Howe International Bridge, to be spent on job training, health monitoring, and environmental remediation in Southwest Detroit. In 2018, he entered a settlement with the ACLU and community partners to prevent home foreclosures throughout Detroit.

Savit maintains an appointment as lecturer at the University of Michigan Law School, where he teaches classes on public interest litigation and state and local government. His academic work has been published in the Michigan Law Review and the Michigan Journal of Law Reform. Savit has authored pieces for publications including the New York Times, the Detroit News, Slate, The Hill, and MLive. He has contributed legal blog Take Care, where he primarily wrote about environmental issues.

Savit contributed to an amicus brief submitted to the Michigan Supreme Court on behalf of the ACLU, the League of Women Voters, and the American Association of University Women. He also testified before the Michigan Civil Rights Commission in support of Equality Michigan's successful effort to have the Commission declare that Michigan's civil rights law prohibits discrimination based on sexual orientation and gender identity.

=== Washtenaw County Prosecuting Attorney ===
On November 10, 2020, Savit announced that he would appoint Victoria Burton-Harris as Washtenaw County's Chief Assistant Prosecuting Attorney. Burton-Harris ran for Wayne County Prosecuting Attorney in the August 2020 Democratic primary against long-time incumbent prosecutor Kym Worthy. She is Washtenaw County's first female Chief Assistant Prosecuting Attorney.

In the fall of 2020, Savit announced that the Washtenaw County Prosecutor's Office would no longer prosecute the use or possession of psychedelic mushrooms or entheogenic plants. Savit's announcement followed a City Council resolution in Ann Arbor, the county seat, that deemed the possession, use, and cultivation of entheogenic plants the city's "lowest law enforcement priority".

Savit was sworn into office on January 2, 2021. During his first several weeks in office Savit announced several major policy changes in the Washtenaw County Prosecutor's Office.

On January 4, 2021, Savit announced that the Washtenaw County Prosecutor's Office would no longer seek to hold people pending trial on cash bail. Savit said that "whether someone is jailed should hinge on the threat they pose to the community, not their financial means." Under Savit's policy, prosecutors make individualized recommendations regarding pre-trial release based on the facts of each case, but do not consider a person's wealth when making that recommendation. The announcement of the policy made Washtenaw County the first prosecutor's office in Michigan not to rely on cash bail.

On January 12, 2021, Savit announced that the Prosecutor's Office would no longer seek charges related to the use, possession, or small-scale distribution of marijuana or entheogenic plants, citing the racially disproportionate impact of the "war on drugs." The next day, Savit announced that the Prosecutor's Office would no longer charge the unauthorized use or possession of buprenorphine, a drug used to treat opioid use disorder. Savit cited research demonstrating that prosecution of buprenorphine leads people in recovery to "backslide" and use more dangerous drugs like fentanyl and heroin, and observed that opioid overdose deaths fell by 50% when the prosecutor in Chittenden County, Vermont enacted a similar policy.

On January 14, 2021, Savit announced that his office would no longer prosecute consensual sex work, instead focusing on human trafficking, sexual assault, and sexual exploitation of children. Savit cited research demonstrating that the threat of prosecution makes sex workers and survivors of trafficking less likely to report crimes. The move was praised by national advocates as a "win for marginalized people" and trafficked persons.

Savit partnered with the ACLU and the University of Michigan Law School on the "Prosecutor Transparency Project," a data partnership which will transparently identify racially disparate treatment in the Washtenaw County Prosecutor's Office. The partnership, which was the first of its kind in Michigan, would make publicly available data related to racial disparities in the justice system.

In May 2024, Savit filed felony charges against four pro-Palestine protestors from the University of Michigan. The protestors were charged for allegedly assaulting police officers during a sit-in at university president Santa Ono's office. These charges attracted criticism and protests from members of the university's Graduate Employees' Organization. Two of the charged were eventually permitted to enter a diversion program, while the other two pled down to misdemeanors.

In April 2026, the Trump administration filed a lawsuit against several Washtenaw County officials, including Savit. The lawsuit, which was filed in U.S. District Court for the Eastern District of Michigan, challenged a Washtenaw County resolution that restricted federal agents from entering county-owned buildings.

== Controversies ==
In April 2026, The Detroit News published a story that documented Savit's use of a government gas card to purchase fuel for travel related to his campaign to become Michigan's attorney general. Savit responded by asserting that his compensation package with Washtenaw County gives him "unlimited use of a county-provided vehicle", and that expenses for his personal use were tracked and reported as "personal". After the story broke, Savit's campaign announced that it was voluntarily reimbursing Washtenaw County for gas purchases associated with his campaign, and that it had secured a dedicated campaign vehicle for future election-related activities. In July 2026, the Michigan Secretary of State's Office determined that Savit's use of the vehicle and his county gas card for campaign related-travel was a potential violation of campaign finance law.

In September 2026, The Detroit News reported that Savit had worked for a private law firm, the United States Virgin Islands-based law firm, Dema Law, while also serving as Washtenaw County prosecutor. Savit's campaign responded that the work had been performed during Savit's spare time, and did not affect his work as prosecutor. Two former Michigan attorney generals questioned the appropriateness of a prosecutor performing outside work for a private firm, but stopped short of asserting that it violated any laws or professional rules. Savit's campaign did not disclose how much money he earned for his services to the firm after becoming Washtenaw County Prosecutor in 2020.

== Electoral history ==
Precinct results for the 2020 Washtenaw County Prosecuting Attorney Democratic primary Savit: Savit—70–80%; Savit—60–70%; Savit—50–60%; Savit—40–50%; Savit/Slay tie: Savit/Slay tie—48.62%; Slay: Slay—50–60%; Slay—40–50%

In May 2019, Savit announced his candidacy for Washtenaw County prosecutor as a Democrat, vowing to "end the era of mass incarceration". Savit's platform included the elimination of cash bail, more support for addiction and mental health treatment programs, and eliminating racial and socioeconomic inequity in the justice system.

Less than two weeks after Savit announced his candidacy, 28-year incumbent prosecutor Brian Mackie announced his retirement. Savit was endorsed by multiple elected officials and community leaders, including former Michigan gubernatorial candidate Abdul El-Sayed, State Senator Jeff Irwin, and three previous chairs of the Michigan Democratic Party.

Savit ran for Washtenaw County Prosecutor against two Democratic primary opponents: Arianne Slay and Hugo Mack. Savit secured endorsements from such high-profile national figures as Senator Bernie Sanders and musician and activist John Legend. On August 4, 2020, Savit won the Democratic primary for Washtenaw County Prosecutor, netting 41,673 votes (51%) compared to 35,380 (43%) for Slay and 5,504 (7%) for Mack.

Savit faced no Republican opposition in the November general election. On November 3, 2020, Savit won the general election, netting 159,998 votes (98.78%), the most votes of any candidate on the ballot in Washtenaw County.

Savit was reelected in 2024 with no primary or general election opposition.

On May 13, 2025, Savit announced that he would run in the 2026 Michigan Attorney General election. In April 2026, he won the endorsement of the Michigan Democratic Party, later officially being nominated in August 2026. Savit later won the general election in November.

2020 Washtenaw County Prosecuting Attorney Democratic primary election
Party	Candidate	Votes	%
Democratic	Eli Savit	41,673	50.5
Democratic	Arianne Slay	35,380	42.9
Democratic	Hugo Mack	5,504	6.7
Total votes		82,557	100.0

2020 Washtenaw County Prosecuting Attorney election
Party	Candidate	Votes	%
Democratic	Eli Savit	159,998	98.78
Write-in	Rejected write-ins	1,978	1.22
Total votes		161,976	100.0

2024 Washtenaw County Prosecuting Attorney Democratic primary election
Party	Candidate	Votes	%
Democratic	Eli Savit	53,894	99.36
Write-in	Rejected write-ins	348	0.64
Total votes		54,242	100.0

2024 Washtenaw County Prosecuting Attorney election
Party	Candidate	Votes	%
Democratic	Eli Savit	158,106	98.19
Write-in	Rejected write-ins	2,907	1.81
Total votes		161,013	100.0

== See also ==
- List of law clerks for the eighth seat of the Supreme Court of the United States

Party political offices
Preceded by Dana Nessel	Democratic nominee for Attorney General of Michigan; 2026	Most recent
