= Darwin L. Booher =

American politician (1942–2025)

Member of the Michigan Senate from the 35th district
- In office January 1, 2011 – December 31, 2018
- Preceded by: Michelle McManus
- Succeeded by: Curt VanderWall

Member of the Michigan House of Representatives from the 102nd district
- In office January 1, 2005 – December 31, 2010
- Preceded by: Rick Johnson
- Succeeded by: Philip Potvin

Personal details
- Born: September 19, 1942 Evart, Michigan, U.S.
- Died: March 16, 2025 (aged 82) Grand Rapids, Michigan, U.S.
- Party: Republican
- Spouse: Jan
- Children: 4
- Education: University of Wisconsin–Madison
- Occupation: Banker, farmer, small business owner
- Website: Sen. Darwin L. Booher

Darwin L. Booher (September 19, 1942 – March 16, 2025) was an American politician who was a Republican member of the Michigan Senate, representing the 35th district from 2010 until 2018. He previously served three terms in the House of Representatives, from 2005 to 2010.

Booher died in Grand Rapids, Michigan, on March 16, 2025, at the age of 82.
