= Donald J. Albosta =

American politician (1925–2014)

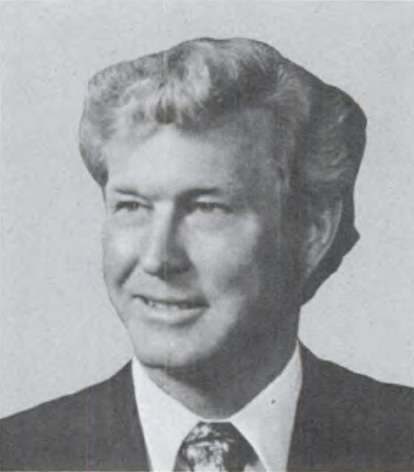

Member of the U.S. House of Representatives from Michigan's 10th district
- In office January 3, 1979 – January 3, 1985
- Preceded by: Elford Cederberg
- Succeeded by: Bill Schuette

Member of the Michigan House of Representatives from the 86th district
- In office 1974–1976
- Preceded by: Robert D. Young
- Succeeded by: Lewis N. Dodak

Personal details
- Born: Donald Joseph Albosta; December 5, 1925 Saginaw, Michigan
- Died: December 18, 2014 (aged 89) St. Charles, Michigan
- Party: Democratic
- Education: Delta College

Donald Joseph Albosta (December 5, 1925 – December 18, 2014) was an American farmer, businessman, and politician from the U.S. state of Michigan. He served three terms in the United States House of Representatives from 1979 to 1985.

Most notably, he was chairman of the U.S. House Committee on Post Office and Civil Service's Subcommittee on Human Resources when it investigated the leaking of Jimmy Carter's briefing papers prior to the key debate of the 1980 U.S. presidential election. This scandal later became known as Debategate.

== Education and early career ==
Albosta was born in Saginaw, Michigan, and attended Saginaw and Chesaning public schools. He graduated from Chesaning Agricultural School, and attended Delta College in Bay City.

He served in the United States Navy, was a farmer, owner, and developer of Misteguay Creek Farms. He served as Albee Township Trustee and was associate director of the Saginaw County Soil Conservation District.

== Political career ==
A Democrat, he was Saginaw County Commissioner from 1970 to 1974 and served in the Michigan State House of Representatives from 1974 to 1976, representing the 86th District. In 1976, he first ran for the United States House of Representatives in Michigan's 10th congressional district losing to longtime incumbent Al Cederberg. His chief of staff was Charles Ehrlich who he hired after Ehrlich worked for an Indiana congressman for 2 years. Ehrlich worked for Albosta for 6 years serving as his chief of staff for the last 2.

Tenure in the House of Representatives

Albosta sought a rematch against Cederberg in 1978. In a major upset, he narrowly defeated Cederberg to become the first Democrat to represent this district in 84 years. He was reelected twice, serving from January 3, 1979, to January 3, 1985.

As a member of the Public Works and Transportation Committee, among others, Rep. Albosta offered amendments that improved the Comprehensive Environmental Response, Compensation and Liability Act, popularly known as "Superfund" including a provision requiring the Center for Disease Control to study the health histories of victims of exposure to hazardous substances in an effort to determine the effects of that exposure or the epidemiology of diseases related to exposures such as those that had inspired Albosta to run for Congress after he led the successful investigation and redress efforts in the wake of the spill of PBBs in cattle feed in Michigan.

Debategate

Albosta was also chair of the House Post Office and Civil Service Committee's Subcommittee on Human Resources which conducted an investigation into the Unauthorized Transfers of Nonpublic Information During the 1980 Presidential Election which published its findings in May 1984 in Committee Print 98-12.

The investigation revealed that the Reagan Campaign included three committees or groups devoted to monitoring and addressing the situation of the hostages held by Iran during the period preceding the 1980 Presidential election, which collectively referred to the potential release of the hostages before the November election as the "October Surprise". Some observers and later investigations by others concluded after the release of the hostages shortly after President Reagan's inauguration that the presidential campaign of Ronald Reagan orchestrated delaying the release of U.S. hostages held by Iran until after the election.

The Albosta Subcommittee Report also confirmed that the Reagan campaign received, copied and used "a pilfered copy" of President Carter's debate briefing book, and related materials from the National Security Council, the term "pilfered" being used by Michigan Republican Congressman David Stockman in a statement on October 28, 1980, describing how he had used the book to prepare candidate Reagan for the debate with President Carter, to a group of about 65 people, according to newspaper reports of Rep. Stockman's speech printed in the Elkhart Truth and Dowagiac Daily News on Wednesday, October 29. The controversy became known as Debategate.

During the investigation, William Casey, then-director of the CIA who had been Reagan's campaign director, said that the person who delivered the leaked briefing books to him was Paul Corbin, a former aide to Robert F. Kennedy and a disgruntled Ted Kennedy supporter. The subcommittee's final report in 1984 reported on scores of interviews with Reagan's former campaign staff and others. It did not conclusively identify the specific individuals within the Carter White House who may have provided the briefing books, but did interview several who may have done so, reported that some witness statements were not entirely candid and seconded the finding of United States District Court Judge Harold Green that the Reagan Administration was required by the Ethics in Government Act to appoint an independent counsel or special prosecutor to conduct an investigation and determine whether to seek an indictment against any of the high-level presidential appointees who had knowingly received and used the stolen White House briefing book in violation of the law. Attorney General Ed Meese declined to appoint an independent counsel.

End of political career

In the late summer of 1984 Rep. Albosta cosponsored a bill introduced by Rep. John LaFalce to provide compensation for victims of hazardous substances. This did not play well with the Dow Chemical Company, headquartered in Albosta's district in Midland, Michigan. Executives and board members of Dow Chemical urged their employees and retirees to oppose Rep. Albosta and he was very narrowly defeated in November by future state Attorney General Bill Schuette. Albosta sought a rematch against Schuette in 1986; he won the Democratic primary, but lost the general election in another close race and retired from politics.

== Retirement and death ==
He was a resident of St. Charles, Michigan. His daughter, Christine C. White, was appointed in March 2003 as the Director of Agriculture Policy for the Michigan Department of Agriculture. Albosta died on December 18, 2014, in St. Charles, Michigan, where he lived, 13 days after his 89th birthday.

== See also ==
- Debategate

== Notes ==
Michigan House of Representatives
Preceded by Robert D. Young	Member of the Michigan House of Representatives from the 86th district 1974 – 1976	Succeeded by Lewis N. Dodak
U.S. House of Representatives
Preceded by Elford Cederberg	Member of the U.S. House of Representatives from Michigan's 10th congressional district 1979 – 1985	Succeeded by Bill Schuette
