= Galloway, Michigan =

- Unincorporated community
- Location within the state of Michigan
- Coordinates: 43°19′54″N 84°22′10″W
- Country: United States
- State: Michigan
- Counties: Gratiot and Saginaw
- Townships: Lafayette and Lakefield
- Elevation: 679 ft (207 m)
- Time zone: UTC-5 (Eastern (EST))
  - Summer (DST): UTC-4 (EDT)
- ZIP code(s): 48637 (Merrill)
- Area code: 989
- FIPS code: 26-31330
- GNIS feature ID: 1617575

Galloway is an unincorporated community in the U.S. state of Michigan. It is located at 43°19′54″N 84°22′10″W on the boundary between Lakefield Township in Saginaw County and Lafayette Township in Gratiot County.

The community is at the junction of Nelson Road and S. Meridian Rd./NE Gratiot County Line Rd.

A post office named Galloway first opened in Gratiot County on February 16, 1883, with Richard Galloway as the first postmaster. This was closed on January 19, 1885. It was re-established on July 16, 1889, on section 24 in Lafayette Township with Andrew Schurr as the first postmaster of the re-established office. When the postmaster moved across the county line into Lakefield Township, the post office moved as well. This office was closed on October 31, 1902.
