= Laurence I. Barrett =

American journalist and author

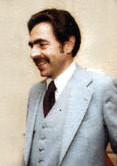
Barrett in 1981

Laurence Irwin Barrett (born September 6, 1935) is an American journalist and author associated with Time, for whom he worked from 1965 until his retirement in 1993.

== Background and personal life ==
Barrett graduated from New York University (1956) and the Columbia University Graduate School of Journalism (1957). He married Martha Patterson in 1988, his previous marriage having ended in divorce. His first marriage of 25 years was to Paulette Singer Barrett.

== Career ==
Barrett joined the New York Herald Tribune in 1957 and covered New York City Hall issues for the paper from 1959 to 1962 before becoming its Washington correspondent. He published The Mayor of New York, a novel, in 1965.

Barrett joined Time in 1965, and, after being a senior editor for six years, returned to reporting in early 1975 as head of its New York office. He was Time's White House correspondent from 1981 to 1985, and then its national political correspondent, before becoming deputy Washington bureau chief. He returned to the position of national political correspondent in mid-1991. Barrett retired from Time in 1993.

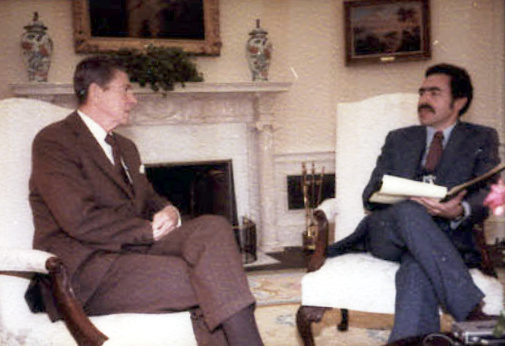
Interviewing Ronald Reagan in 1981

In 1983 Barrett published Gambling with History: Reagan in the White House, based on "unusual access to internal deliberations" for a period of two years. Revelations included Richard Darman's successful attempt to stall the invocation of Section 4 of the Twenty-fifth Amendment to the United States Constitution when President Reagan was receiving treatment following the 1981 assassination attempt on him. The book also revealed what became known as "Debategate" - the theft of papers by the Reagan campaign from the Carter campaign during the 1980 presidential election.

== Retirement ==
After his retirement in 1993, Barrett became vice president of a Washington public relations firm, and a member of the advisory board of the Washington Center for Politics & Journalism.

== Books ==
- The Mayor of New York, Doubleday, 1965
- Gambling with History: Reagan in the White House, Doubleday, 1983
