= Dave Camp =

American politician (born 1953)

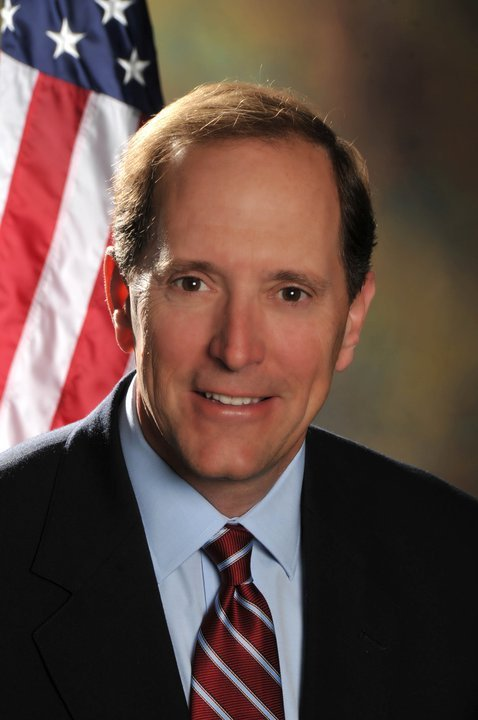

Chair of the House Ways and Means Committee
- In office January 3, 2011 – January 3, 2015
- Preceded by: Sander Levin
- Succeeded by: Paul Ryan

Member of the U.S. House of Representatives from Michigan
- In office January 3, 1991 – January 3, 2015
- Preceded by: Bill Schuette
- Succeeded by: John Moolenaar
- Constituency: 10th district (1991–1993); 4th district (1993–2015)

Member of the Michigan House of Representatives from the 102nd district
- In office January 11, 1989 – January 3, 1991
- Preceded by: Michael D. Hayes
- Succeeded by: James R. McNutt

Personal details
- Born: David Lee Camp; July 9, 1953 (age 72) Midland, Michigan, U.S.
- Party: Republican
- Spouse: Nancy Camp
- Education: Albion College (BA); University of San Diego (JD)
- Camp's voice Camp supporting the SGR Repeal and Medicare Provider Payment Modernization Act of 2014. Recorded March 14, 2014

David Lee Camp (born July 9, 1953) is a former American politician who served as a member of the United States House of Representatives from 1991 to 2015. Camp represented Michigan's 4th congressional district since 1993, and previously served one term representing Michigan's 10th congressional district. A member of the Republican Party, Camp was chair of the House Committee on Ways and Means, serving from 2011 to 2015. He retired in 2014.

== Early life, education, and law career ==
Camp was born in Midland, Michigan, the son of Norma L. (Nehil) and Robert D. Camp. He graduated from H.H. Dow High School in 1971. He attended the University of Sussex, Brighton, England, 1973–1974 and earned his Bachelor of Arts, magna cum laude, in 1975 from Albion College in Albion, Michigan. He earned a Juris Doctor from the University of San Diego School of Law in 1978. From 1979 to 1991, he was a partner with the law firm Riecker, Van Dam & Barker in Midland, Michigan.

Camp was diagnosed with early-stage non-Hodgkin's large B-cell lymphoma in 2012. After several months of chemotherapy, Camp announced he was cancer-free in December 2012.

== Early political career ==
Camp worked as a member of the Midland County, Michigan board of canvassers and a member of the Midland County Republican executive committee. For 4 years he was special assistant to the Michigan attorney general from 1980 to 1984. He served another 4 years on the staff of his boyhood friend U.S. Representative Bill Schuette (R-MI) from 1984 to 1987, before running and winning the 102nd District of the Michigan House of Representatives in 1988 and serving one term.

== U.S. House of Representatives ==
=== Elections ===
When U.S. Congressman Schuette of Michigan's 10th congressional district decided in 1990 to run for the U.S. Senate against incumbent U.S. Senator Carl Levin, Camp ran to replace him and won the endorsement of his former boss. In the Republican primary he faced former U.S. Congressman James Dunn and former State Senator Alan Cropsey. Despite trailing Dunn in early polls, Camp won the Republican primary with a plurality of 33%. He defeated Cropsey (30%), Allen (19%), Dunn (18%), and Simcox (1%). He won the general election with 65% of the vote.

After redistricting, he decided to run in Michigan's 4th congressional district. He won the general election with 62% of the vote. He never won re-election with less than 61% of the vote and never had a primary challenge.

== Tenure ==
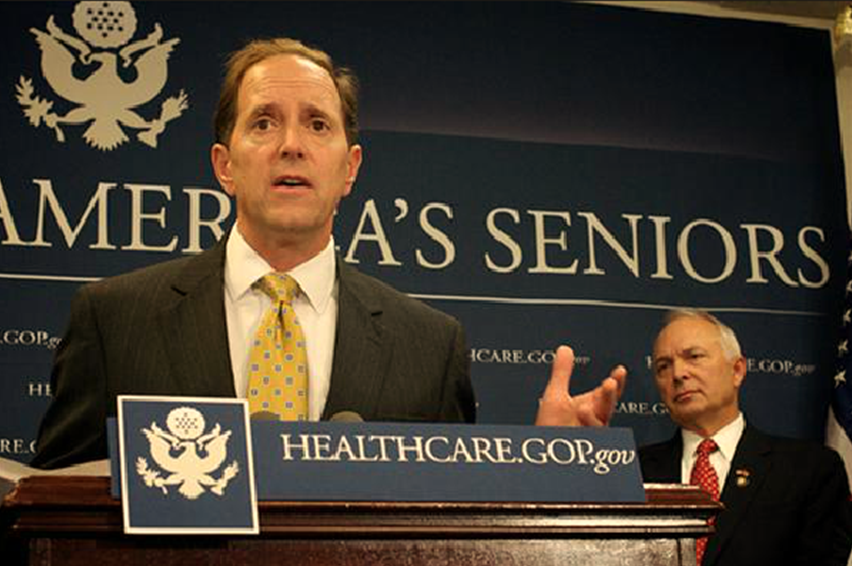
Representative Camp at a press conference.

=== 102nd Congress ===
Camp served on the House Committee on Agriculture. Camp received the Golden Plow Award in 1998 from the American Farm Bureau Federation.

=== 108th Congress ===
In the 108th Congress, he served as a deputy majority whip and served on the House Ways and Means Committee. Speaker Denny Hastert chose Camp to serve on the Select United States House Committee on Homeland Security, which had been created by the House of Representatives on January 7, 2003. While on the committee Camp was the Chairman of the Subcommittee on Infrastructure and Border Security, where he helped develop policies to secure U.S. land and maritime borders in the wake of the September 11, 2001 terrorist attacks.

=== 109th and 110th Congresses ===
Camp was the Ranking Member of the Subcommittee on Health, and Chairman of the Subcommittee on Select Revenue Measures, respectively. He served seven terms as a Member of the Subcommittee on Human Resources, and six terms as a Member of the Subcommittee on Trade. As a junior Member of the committee in 1996, Camp played a role in the passage of the Personal Responsibility and Work Opportunity Act.

=== 111th Congress ===
Camp served as Ranking Member of the full committee on Ways and Means. Camp was one of three House Republicans appointed by then-Minority Leader John Boehner (R-OH) to serve on the National Commission on Fiscal Responsibility and Reform, known as the Bowles-Simpson Commission, formed in February 2010. It was charged with identifying policies to improve the U.S. fiscal situation in the medium term, and to achieve fiscal sustainability over the long term. While on the Commission, which failed to achieve its aims and did not see enactment of any of its proposals, Camp co-led the Tax Reform Working Group and was a member of the Mandatory Spending Working Group.

=== 113th Congress ===
Camp introduced the Promoting Adoption and Legal Guardianship for Children in Foster Care Act into the House on September 27, 2013. The bill reauthorized the Adoption Incentives Program that focuses on helping states to find adoptive parents for foster children and passed the House on October 22, 2013. Camp later introduced the Preventing Sex Trafficking and Strengthening Families Act (H.R. 4980; 113th Congress) which passed the House on July 23, 2014.

On June 26, 2014, Camp introduced the Improving Medicare Post-Acute Care Transformation Act of 2014 (H.R. 4994; 113th Congress), a bill intended to change and improve Medicare's post-acute care (PAC) services and how they are reported on.

=== Committee assignments ===
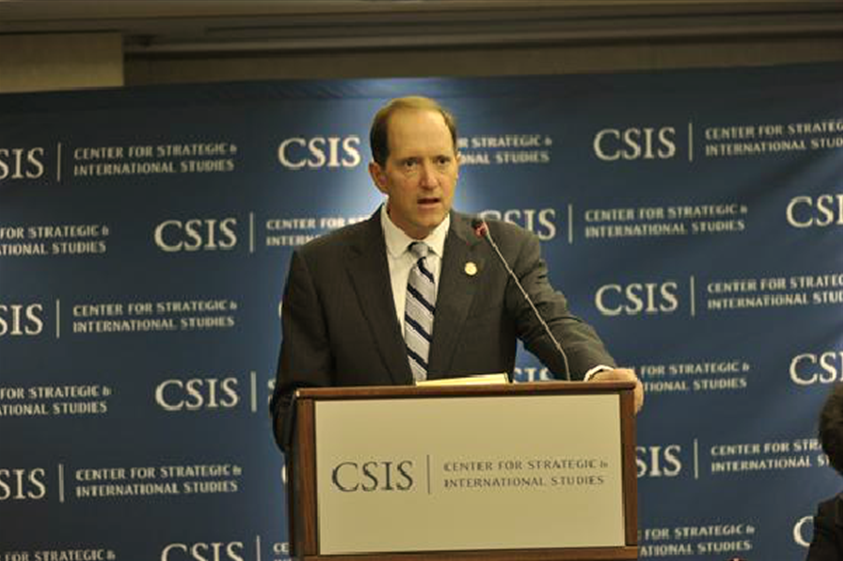
Representative Camp speaking at the Center for Strategic and International Studies.

- Committee on Ways and Means (Chair)
- Joint Committee on Taxation (Chair)
- Joint Select Committee on Deficit Reduction

=== Caucus memberships ===
- Building a Better America Caucus
- International Conservation Caucus
- Life Insurance Caucus
- Sportsmen's Caucus
- Zero Capital Gains Tax Caucus
- Congressional Cement Caucus

== Positions and policies ==
"I'm a conservative on fiscal policy, but I'm a moderate on some other issues," he told Congressional Quarterly in 2006. He told National Review in 2007 that he feels "more at home" with the conservative Republican Steering Committee. Camp is part of the moderate bloc through his participation in the Main Street Partnership. He generally voted along party lines in the House, siding with Republicans 93.7 percent of the time during the 111th Congress. The American Conservative Union gave him a lifetime rating of 89 percent, his score with the Club for Growth is considerably lower. Camp voted for both the North American Free Trade Agreement and the Central American Free Trade Agreement. In August 2013 Camp announced his support for cutting benefits to the Temporary Assistance for Needy Families (TANF) program.

Camp introduced the Tax Reform Act of 2014 on February 26, 2014. The congressional nonpartisan Joint Committee on Taxation calculated the bill would allow 95 percent of filers to get the lowest tax rate possible by claiming the standard deduction, would create up to 1.8 million jobs and increase gross domestic product by up to 1.4% in 2023.

== Post-political career ==
Approximately one year after announcing his decision not to run for re-election to Congress, it was announced that Camp would be joining prominent accounting firm PricewaterhouseCoopers as a senior policy advisor.

U.S. House of Representatives
Preceded by Bill Schuette	Member of the U.S. House of Representatives from Michigan's 10th congressional district 1991–1993	Succeeded by David Bonior
Preceded by Fred Upton	Member of the U.S. House of Representatives from Michigan's 4th congressional district 1993–2015	Succeeded by John Moolenaar
Preceded by Jim McCrery	Ranking Member of the House Ways and Means Committee; 2009–2011	Succeeded by Sander Levin
Preceded by Sander Levin	Chair of the House Ways and Means Committee; 2011–2015	Succeeded by Paul Ryan
U.S. order of precedence (ceremonial)
Preceded by Bill Alexander as Former U.S. Representative	Order of precedence of the United States as Former U.S. Representative	Succeeded by Don Fuqua as Former U.S. Representative
