= Debategate =

1980 American political scandal

Debategate or briefing-gate was a political scandal affecting the administration of Ronald Reagan; it took place in the final days of the 1980 presidential election. Reagan's team acquired President Jimmy Carter's briefing papers, classified top secret, that Carter used in preparation for the October 28, 1980 debate with Reagan. The briefing papers were never specified to be either vital strategy memos or just routine position papers. This leak of campaign papers was not divulged to the public until late June 1983, after Laurence Barrett published Gambling with History: Reagan in the White House, an in-depth account of the Reagan administration's first two years.

== 1980 presidential debate ==
The League of Women Voters organized two debates of the 1980 U.S. presidential election. The Republican nominee Ronald Reagan participated in both debates. Independent candidate John B. Anderson only participated in the first debate, while the Democratic nominee and incumbent President Jimmy Carter only participated in the second debate.

The first debate took place on September 21, 1980, and the second debate took place on October 28, 1980.

Key aides involved in the second Reagan debate preparation were James Baker, David Gergen, and David Stockman. They had access to briefing papers from the Carter campaign. The importance of these documents is still in question. At the time the second debate took place, Reagan was ahead in the polls with 43 percent to Carter's 37 percent with 11 percent of voters undecided. The stakes were high for this debate, especially since Carter had the possibility of an October surprise, such as the release of the hostages in Iran.

House Speaker Tip O'Neill said that the debate ultimately did not affect the outcome of the election, arguing that an unpopular Carter would have lost even if he had been seen to "win" the debate.

== Investigation ==
The leak of the campaign papers first came to public attention in June 1983, with the publication of Laurence Barrett's Gambling with History: Reagan in the White House, an in-depth account of the Reagan administration's first two years. Comments on the matter by David Stockman, made at an Optimist Club lunch in Cassopolis, Michigan, on the day of the debate, noted that in assisting with Reagan's preparations, Stockman had had access to a "pilfered" copy of Carter's briefing book; these remarks had been reported only in local newspapers. The publication of Barrett's book saw efforts by Jody Powell and Patrick Caddell to push the issue onto the press agenda, ultimately leading to Reagan asking the Justice Department to "monitor" the issue. The president denied having any knowledge about briefing papers his campaign was thought to have obtained.

An investigation was then launched by the U.S. House Committee on Post Office and Civil Service's Subcommittee on Human Resources under the chairmanship of Donald J. Albosta (D-MI). This produced a 2,400-page report in May 1984.

James Baker swore under oath that he had received the briefing book from William Casey, Reagan's campaign manager, but Casey, then campaign manager, later CIA director, vehemently denied this. David Stockman, the head of the Office of Management and Budget, admitted using the Carter material while helping Reagan prepare for the debate. Stockman said the documents obtained were just position papers, not in question-and-answer format. Frank Hodsoll, also a member of the debate team, said that they were in Q&A form. The investigation turned up hundreds of pages of documents from the Carter campaign in Stockman's files as well as in Reagan's campaign archives at Stanford University's Hoover Institute. One document, an itinerary for Carter during the week prior to Election Day, had "report from White House mole" written on it. This seemed to confirm author Laurence Barrett's conclusion in his book that the material had been stolen. But U.S. News & World Report indicated that the document in question had been volunteered by someone working for Carter. Other papers were turned in to The Washington Post by a collector of political memorabilia who, in October 1980, had exhumed them from a dumpster behind Reagan headquarters in Arlington, Virginia. The press speculated that the Reagan campaign had been concerned that Carter would pull an October surprise during the campaign—cutting a deal with the Ayatollah Khomeini for the release of the 52 hostages held for over a year by Iran, a bombshell that some believed might have sent Carter back to the White House for four more years. Newsweek wondered whether a clandestine operation involving ex-CIA agents had been undertaken by the Reagan team to keep close tabs on the Carter campaign. This was supported by Time in its July 25, 1983, issue. According to that report, William Casey brought in former agents of both the CIA and the FBI to gather information from colleagues who were still with that agency. Jimmy Carter complained that the pilfered documents revealed the "essence" of his campaign, implying that his reelection bid had been done great harm when they fell into Republican hands.

The matter was never resolved as both the FBI and a congressional subcommittee reporting in May 1984 failed to determine how or through whom the briefing book came to the Reagan campaign. The Justice Department, in closing its investigation, cited "the professed lack of memory or knowledge on the part of those in possession of the documents". Still, it said the contradictions between Reagan aides like Baker and Casey "could be explained by differences in recollection or interpretation". In a case brought by John F. Banzhaf III, an order by a federal judge that the Justice Department appoint a special prosecutor was overturned on appeal in July 1984.

The New York Times reported the Reagan campaign headquarters conducted a data-gathering operation to collect inside information on Carter foreign policy and used a number of former CIA officials in the effort. It said Stefan Halper, a campaign aide who handled communications for Bush and provided news updates and policy ideas to the traveling Reagan party, was in charge of the operation. Halper called the report "just absolutely untrue".

== Aftermath ==
In 2004 and again in 2005, Carter accused columnist George Will of giving the briefing book to the Reagan campaign. In a 2005 syndicated column, Will called his role in Reagan's debate preparation "inappropriate", given his position as a columnist, but denied any role in stealing the briefing book. In his column, Will quoted from a letter he had written to Carter privately: "My cursory glance at it convinced me that it was a crashing bore and next to useless—for you [Carter], or for anyone else". In response to Will's column, Carter wrote a letter to The Washington Post retracting his accusations. Carter apologized to Will for "any incorrect statement that I have ever made about his role in the use of my briefing book.... I have never thought Mr. Will took my book, that the outcome of the debate was damaging to my campaign or that Mr. Will apologized to me".

In his 2009 campaign examination Rendezvous with Destiny, Reagan biographer and historian Craig Shirley wrote that the briefing papers were passed to Casey by Paul Corbin, an aide from Ted Kennedy's failed primary campaign. According to the book, the Kennedy family and campaign workers were embittered by Carter's treatment of Kennedy's challenge in the 1980 Democratic primary, and Corbin used connections in the White House to steal the papers in revenge. Shirley also contended that the contents of the briefing book were a compilation of Reagan's earlier speeches. Shirley concluded that the theft had no effect on the race, even though Carter continued to blame his defeat on the stolen papers.

== See also ==
- Killing Reagan (film)
- List of scandals with "-gate" suffix
