= Rick Johnson (Michigan politician) =

American politician

Speaker of the Michigan House of Representatives
- In office January 10, 2001 – December 31, 2004
- Preceded by: Charles R. Perricone
- Succeeded by: Craig DeRoche

Member of the Michigan House of Representatives from the 102nd district
- In office January 1, 1999 – December 31, 2004
- Preceded by: John Gernaat
- Succeeded by: Darwin L. Booher

Personal details
- Party: Republican
- Spouse: Janice
- Children: 2

Rick Johnson is a Michigan politician who served in the House of Representatives for the 102nd District from 1999 to 2004, and as Speaker of the House from 2001 to 2004. He was chairman of the Michigan medical marijuana licensing board from 2017 to 2019. In 2023, he pled guilty to receiving bribes during his time on the licensing board.

Born in LeRoy, Osceola County, Johnson was an honors graduate of Pine River High School. He served as an Osceola County commissioner for eight years from 1986 to 1994, including five as chairman of the board, and on the Pine River School Board for six years from 1980 to 1986. Johnson was vice chairman of the Region VII Planning Commission and the District VII director of the Michigan Farm Bureau, serving as a state board member from 1994 to 1998. He was also owner and operator of the family dairy and tree farm, on the board of the Rose Lake Youth Camp, and is active in the Osceola County Community Foundation. As a former state House speaker, Johnson is a permanent member of the National Speakers Conference Executive Committee.

He is a partner in the firm Dodak Johnson with fellow former Speaker Lew Dodak.

In 2015, Johnson signed an amicus brief asking the United States Supreme Court to make same-sex marriage legal nationwide.

On April 6, 2023, the FBI and U.S. Attorney's office announced that a plea agreement had been made with Johnson and three others as part of a medical marijuana bribery scheme. Marijuana company owners stated they had paid Johnson over $110,000 in cash and services for licensing approval.

== See also ==
- List of Michigan state legislatures
