= Michael D. Hayes =

American politician (born 1951)

The Honorable Michael D. Hayes

Member of the Michigan House of Representatives from the 102nd district
- In office January 1, 1981 – December 31, 1988
- Preceded by: Louis Cramton
- Succeeded by: Dave Camp

Personal details
- Born: January 12, 1951 (age 75) Owosso, Michigan
- Party: Republican
- Spouse: Debra
- Education: Central Michigan University

Michael D. Hayes is a Republican member of the Michigan State Transportation Commission and former member of the Michigan House of Representatives.

A native of Owosso, Hayes graduated from Central Michigan University with both a bachelor's and master's degree. He was elected Midland County Clerk in 1976 and served one term before being elected to the House in 1980. Hayes was re-elected three times and was succeeded by Dave Camp.

After leaving the Legislature, Hayes joined the Dow Chemical Company and worked there in several capacities over two decades, retiring as vice president of executive relations. In late 2011, Governor Rick Snyder appointed Hayes to the Michigan State Transportation Commission and to the authority overseeing the Gordie Howe International Bridge.

Hayes helped bring the Great Lakes Loons to Midland, and serves as vice president and secretary of the Michigan Baseball Foundation. He is also president and CEO of the Midland Center for the Arts and serves on several community boards.

Hayes was a delegate to the 1988 Republican National Convention which nominated George H. W. Bush for President of the United States.
