= Karen McDonald (politician) =

American lawyer and politician (born 1970)

Prosecuting Attorney of Oakland County
- Incumbent
- Assumed office January 1, 2021
- Preceded by: Jessica Cooper

Personal details
- Born: Karen Diane McDonald; July 11, 1970 (age 55) Lansing, Michigan, U.S.
- Party: Democratic
- Spouse: Jeffrey
- Children: 5
- Relatives: Kristen McDonald Rivet (twin sister)
- Education: Alma College (BA); Wayne State University (JD)
- Website: Campaign website

Karen Diane McDonald (born July 11, 1970) is an American lawyer and politician currently serving as the prosecuting attorney of Oakland County, Michigan, and formerly as a judge on Michigan's 6th Circuit Court in Oakland County. In June 2025, Karen McDonald announced her candidacy for the 2026 Michigan Attorney General election, seeking to succeed term-limited Attorney General, Dana Nessel. She is a member of the Democratic Party.

== Early life, education, and career ==
Karen McDonald was born on July 11, 1970, in Lansing, Michigan, alongside her fraternal twin sister Kristen McDonald Rivet, to parents Bob and Kathy McDonald. Shortly after she was born, McDonald’s parents moved from the Lansing area to Portland, Michigan, where she was raised. McDonald graduated from Portland High School and earned her B.A. in English and political science from Alma College in 1992. She became a public school English teacher and was a member of her local Michigan Education Association union.

After graduating cum laude from Wayne State University Law School in 1998, McDonald joined the Oakland County Prosecutor's Office as an assistant prosecuting attorney. In 2004, McDonald joined the Oakland County-based firm Jaffe, Raitt, Heuer & Weiss P.C., where she specialized in civil and family law, and was named partner and shareholder in 2010.

In 2018, she was the recipient of the Oakland County Domestic Violence Prevention Award and the Joan E. Young Champion of Children Award.

== 2012 election and Circuit Court judge ==
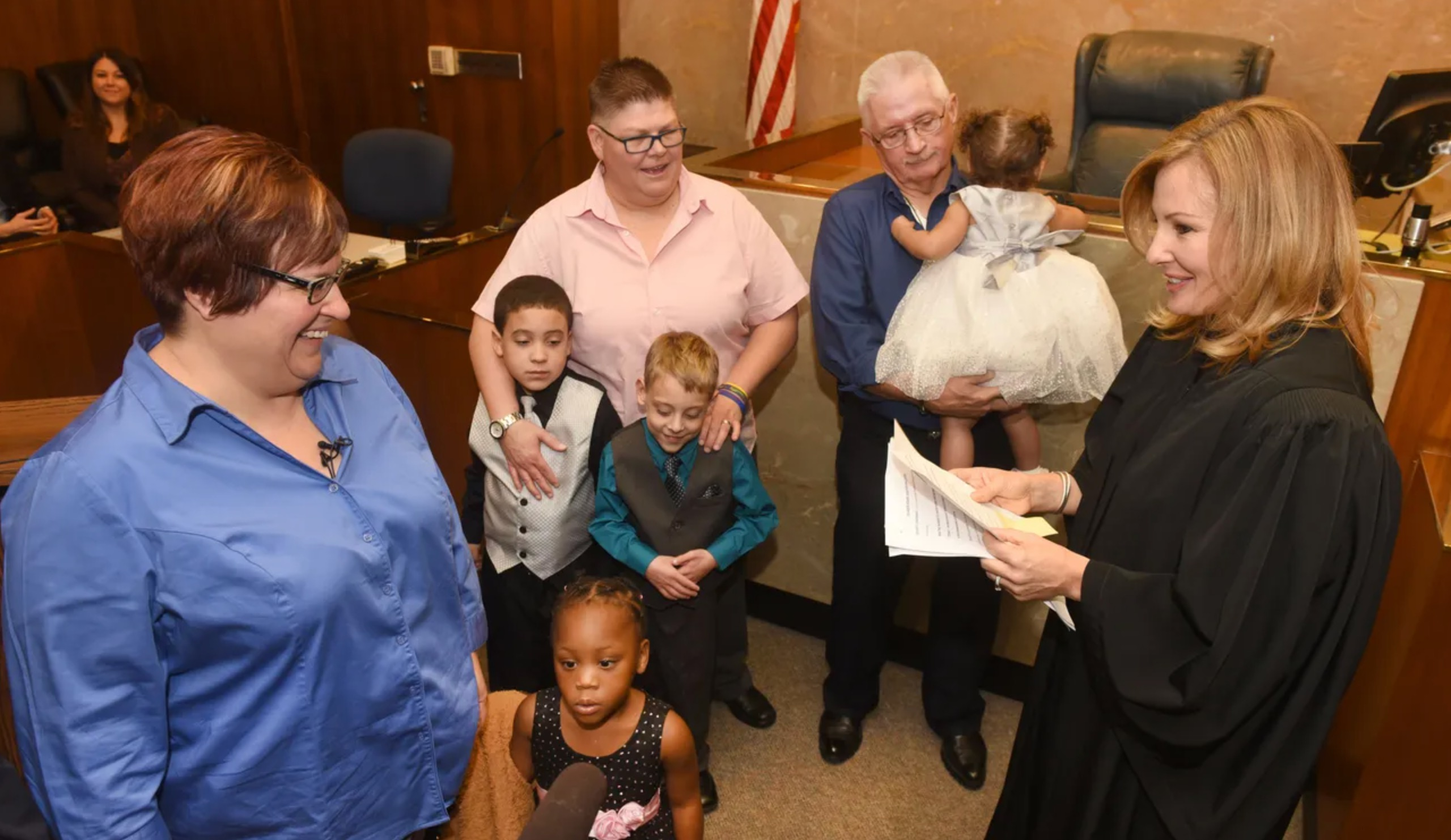
Judge Karen McDonald presides over first same-sex adoption in State of Michigan

In 2012, McDonald ran for an open seat on the Oakland County Circuit Court, winning the non-partisan judicial election with nearly 60% of the vote. Taking office in January 2013, McDonald presided for over six years as a family court judge, taking a docket focused on divorce and custody, child abuse and neglect, as well as juvenile delinquency cases. In 2015, McDonald presided over the first same-sex adoption in the history of the State of Michigan, stating that the case was a great honor. McDonald was unopposed in her 2018 re-election bid, and on November 6, 2018, she was elected for a second six-year term on the 6th Circuit Court, ranking as the top vote-earner of incumbent circuit court judges.

== 2020 election and Oakland County Prosecutor ==
In April 2019, McDonald stepped down from her judgeship, announcing her intention to run for the Democratic nomination for Oakland County Prosecuting Attorney in the 2020 election. McDonald campaigned on a progressive, reformist platform focused on limiting incarceration for non-violent crimes, and ensuring prosecutorial decisions are informed by racial justice considerations. On August 4, 2020, McDonald defeated incumbent prosecutor Jessica Cooper, claiming the Democratic nomination for Oakland County Prosecuting Attorney and advancing to the general election. On November 3, 2020, McDonald was elected Oakland County Prosecutor, and was the top vote-getter among all county-wide candidates.

== First term as Oakland County Prosecutor ==
McDonald took office on January 1, 2021.

Within her first 100 days in office, McDonald shared the status of several initiatives she undertook upon taking office. Within this time, her administration issued re-sentencing memos for nearly two dozen juvenile lifers, rolled out prosecutorial discretion to Assistant Prosecutors, established the Trafficking Unit and the Hate Crimes Unit, re-engaged the Prosecutor's Office as an active participant in over a dozen diversion programs and treatment courts, formed a team to establish a Conviction Integrity Unit, and re-established relationships with community and law enforcement partners.

=== Trafficking Unit ===
McDonald changed the Narcotics Unit into a Trafficking Unit, shifting the focus from the use and possession of drugs to the trafficking of drugs and people. In September 2023, Richard Coleman was found guilty by an Oakland County jury on all eleven charges brought against him by the prosecutor's office, including human trafficking. The investigation revealed that over 20 women were identified as having been abused and trafficked by Coleman.

=== Oxford High School shooting ===
On November 30, 2021, the Oxford High School shooting took place. McDonald led the prosecution against the shooter, along with his parents who were each charged with four counts of involuntary manslaughter for the gross negligence that led to the horrific shooting. The shooter pled guilty to all 24 counts against him as charged on October 4, 2022. After a Miller hearing in fall 2023, the shooter was sentenced to life without parole on December 8, 2023, by Judge Kwamé Rowe.

The shooter's mother, Jennifer Crumbley, was convicted on February 6, 2024. James Crumbley was convicted on March 14, 2024 Both James and Jennifer were sentenced on April 9, 2024, by Judge Cheryl Matthews and each received a term of 10-15 years imprisonment, above the guidelines.

=== Commission to Address Gun Violence ===
McDonald formed the Commission to Address Gun Violence in September 2022.

== Electoral history ==
Oakland County Prosecuting Attorney, 2024 General Election
Party	Candidate	Votes	%
Democratic	Karen McDonald	419,935	58
Republican	Scott Farida	307,681	42
Total votes		727,616	99

Oakland County Prosecuting Attorney, 2020 General Election
Party	Candidate	Votes	%
Democratic	Karen McDonald	411,975	56.9
Republican	Lin Goetz	311,360	43.0
Total votes		723,335	98

Oakland County Prosecuting Attorney, 2020 Democratic Primary
Party	Candidate	Votes	%
Democratic	Karen McDonald	131,545	65.8
Democratic	Jessica Cooper (incumbent)	68,325	34.2
Total votes		199,870	100

Judge of the Oakland County Circuit Court, 2018 General Election
Party	Candidate	Votes	%
Nonpartisan	Karen McDonald (incumbent)	279,690	21.50
Nonpartisan	Denise Langford Morris (incumbent)	263,504	20.25
Nonpartisan	Leo Bowman (incumbent)	261,649	20.11
Nonpartisan	Phyllis McMillen (incumbent)	256,287	19.70
Nonpartisan	Michael Warren (incumbent)	240,013	18.45
Total votes		1,301,143	100

Judge of the Oakland County Circuit Court, 2012 General Election
Party	Candidate	Votes	%
Nonpartisan	Karen McDonald	250,228	58.97
Nonpartisan	Dan Crist	171,125	40.33
Total votes		424,334	100
