= Michigan's 102nd House of Representatives district =

American legislative district

Michigan's 102nd State House of Representatives district
Representative
Curt VanderWall; R–Ludington
- Demographics: 85.9% White; 1.6% Black; 7.5% Hispanic; 0.4% Asian; 0.6% Native American; 0.2% Other; 3.9% Multiracial
- Population (2024): 93,208

Michigan's 102nd House of Representatives district (also referred to as Michigan's 102nd House district) is a legislative district within the Michigan House of Representatives located in parts of Manistee, Mason, Muskegon, and Oceana counties. The district was created in 1965, when the Michigan House of Representatives district naming scheme changed from a county-based system to a numerical one.

== List of representatives ==
Representative	Party	Dates	Residence	Notes
Sanford E. Charron	Democratic	1965–1966	Pinconning	
George Prescott	Republican	1967–1972	Tawas City	
Louis K. Cramton	Republican	1973–1980	Midland	
Michael D. Hayes	Republican	1981–1988	Midland	
Dave Camp	Republican	1989–1990	Midland	
James R. McNutt	Republican	1991–1992	Midland	
John Gernaat	Republican	1993–1998	McBain	
Rick Johnson	Republican	1999–2004	LeRoy	
Darwin L. Booher	Republican	2005–2010	Evart	
Philip Potvin	Republican	2011–2016	Cadillac	
Michele Hoitenga	Republican	2017–2022	Manton	
Curt VanderWall	Republican	2023–present	Ludington	

== Recent elections ==
=== 2020s ===
2026 Michigan House of Representatives election
Party	Candidate	Votes	%
Republican	Curt VanderWall (incumbent)	26,419	58.57
Democratic	Angel Coon	18,045	40
Libertarian	Shawn Orton	643	1.43
Total votes		45,107	100
Republican hold			

2024 Michigan House of Representatives election
Party	Candidate	Votes	%
Republican	Curt VanderWall	34,218	63.8
Democratic	Kathy Pelleran-Mahoney	19,421	36.2
Total votes		53,639	100
Republican hold			

2022 Michigan House of Representatives election
Party	Candidate	Votes	%
Republican	Curt VanderWall	26,690	61.1
Democratic	Brian Hosticka	17,010	38.9
Total votes		43,700	100
Republican hold			

2020 Michigan House of Representatives election
Party	Candidate	Votes	%
Republican	Michele Hoitenga	30,633	69.7
Democratic	Amanda Siggins	13,341	30.3
Total votes		43,974	100
Republican hold			

2018 Michigan House of Representatives election
Party	Candidate	Votes	%
Republican	Michele Hoitenga	22,286	67.8
Democratic	Dion Adams	10,599	32.2
Total votes		32,885	100
Republican hold			

2016 Michigan House of Representatives election
Party	Candidate	Votes	%
Republican	Michele Hoitenga	24,761	69.1
Democratic	Doug Gabert	11,099	31.0
Total votes		35,860	100
Republican hold			

2014 Michigan House of Representatives election
Party	Candidate	Votes	%
Republican	Philip Potvin	14,717	60.1
Democratic	John Ruggles	9,761	39.9
Total votes		24,478	100
Republican hold			

2012 Michigan House of Representatives election
Party	Candidate	Votes	%
Republican	Philip Potvin	19.281	54.8
Democratic	Brendan Maturen	15,916	45.2
Total votes		35,197	100
Republican hold			

2010 Michigan House of Representatives election
Party	Candidate	Votes	%
Republican	Philip Potvin	18,825	65.7
Democratic	Jodi Estes Gabert	8,471	29.6
Independent	Roy Kissinger	1,340	4.7
Total votes		28,636	100
Republican hold			

2008 Michigan House of Representatives election
Party	Candidate	Votes	%
Republican	Darwin L. Booher	26,198	69.6
Democratic	Nate Heffron	10,694	28.4
Libertarian	Thomas Hren	753	2.0
Total votes		37,645	100
Republican hold			

== Historical district boundaries ==
Map	Description	Apportionment Plan	Notes
	Arenac County Bay County (part): Beaver Township; Frankenlust Township; Garfield Township; Gibson Township; Hampton Township; Merritt Township; Monitor Township; Mount Forest Township; Pinconning; Pinconning Township; Portsmouth Township; Williams Township; Iosco County Ogemaw County	1964 Apportionment Plan	
	Bay County (part): Auburn; Beaver Township; Fraser Township; Garfield Township; Kawkawlin Township; Midland (part); Monitor Township (part); Williams Township; Midland County (part): Excluding; Hope Township	1972 Apportionment Plan	
	Gratiot County (part): Bethany Township; Pine River Township (part); St. Louis; Midland County	1982 Apportionment Plan	
	Missaukee County; Osceola County; Roscommon County; Wexford County	1992 Apportionment Plan	
	Mecosta County; Osceola County; Wexford County	2001 Apportionment Plan	
	Mecosta County Osceola County (part): Burdell Township; Cedar Township; Hartwick Township; Le Roy Township; Lincoln Township; Reed City; Richmond Township; Rose Lake Township; Wexford County	2011 Apportionment Plan	
