= Jonesfield Township, Michigan =

- Civil township
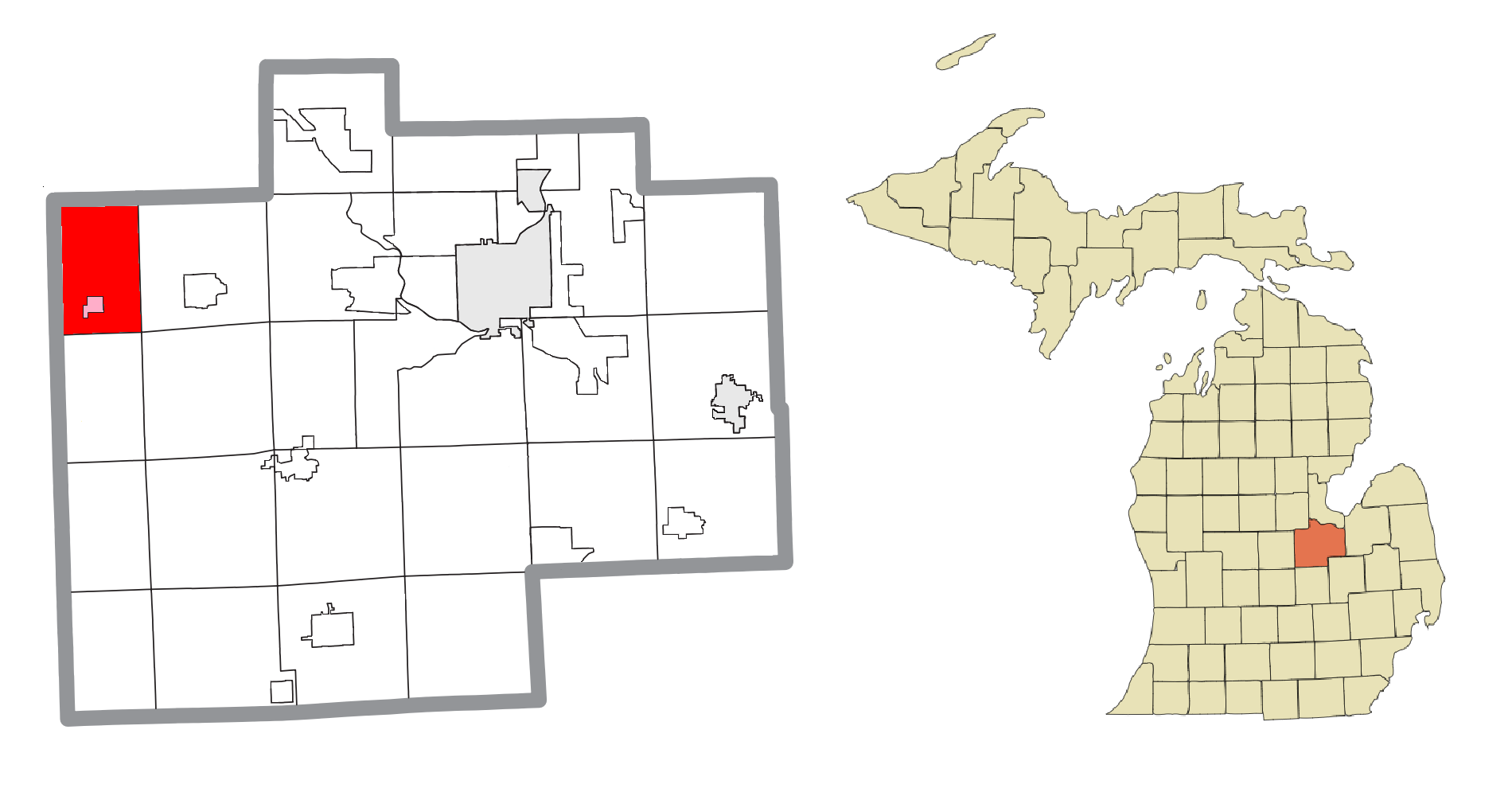
- Location within Saginaw County (red) and the administered village of Merrill (pink)

- Location within the state of Michigan Jonesfield Township (the United States)
- Coordinates: 43°24′49″N 84°20′07″W
- Country: United States
- State: Michigan
- County: Saginaw

Government
  - Supervisor: Larry Tibbits
  - Clerk: Julie Foye

Area
  - Total: 25.2 sq mi (65.3 km^{2})
  - Land: 25.2 sq mi (65.3 km^{2})
  - Water: 0 sq mi (0.0 km^{2})
- Elevation: 666 ft (203 m)

Population (2020)
  - Total: 1,618
  - Density: 64.2/sq mi (24.8/km^{2})
- Time zone: UTC-5 (Eastern (EST))
  - Summer (DST): UTC-4 (EDT)
- ZIP code(s): 48637 (Merrill)
- Area code: 989
- FIPS code: 26-41900
- GNIS feature ID: 1626543
- Website: Official website

Jonesfield Township is a civil township of Saginaw County in the U.S. state of Michigan. The population was 1,618 at the 2020 Census. The Village of Merrill is located within Jonesfield Township.

== Geography ==
According to the United States Census Bureau, the township has a total area of 25.2 square miles (65 km^{2}), all land.

=== Major highways ===
- M-30 is a north–south route that forms the western boundary of the township.
- M-46 serves as an east–west thoroughfare within the township.

== Demographics ==
As of the census of 2000, there were 1,710 people, 652 households, and 490 families residing in the township. The population density was 67.9 inhabitants per square mile (26.2/km^{2}). There were 674 housing units at an average density of 26.7 per square mile (10.3/km^{2}). The racial makeup of the township was 98.13% White, 0.06% African American, 0.53% Native American, 0.82% from other races, and 0.47% from two or more races. Hispanic or Latino of any race were 2.28% of the population.

There were 652 households, out of which 33.7% had children under the age of 18 living with them, 61.7% were married couples living together, 10.0% had a female householder with no husband present, and 24.7% were non-families. 21.0% of all households were made up of individuals, and 11.0% had someone living alone who was 65 years of age or older. The average household size was 2.61 and the average family size was 3.00.

In the township the population was spread out, with 24.7% under the age of 18, 8.1% from 18 to 24, 28.2% from 25 to 44, 23.2% from 45 to 64, and 15.8% who were 65 years of age or older. The median age was 38 years. For every 100 females, there were 94.5 males. For every 100 females age 18 and over, there were 91.1 males.

The median income for a household in the township was $41,992, and the median income for a family was $45,921. Males had a median income of $39,773 versus $29,519 for females. The per capita income for the township was $19,348. About 5.1% of families and 7.7% of the population were below the poverty line, including 9.3% of those under age 18 and 8.9% of those age 65 or over.
