= Lafayette Township, Michigan =

Civil Township of Gratiot county, Michigan

- Civil township
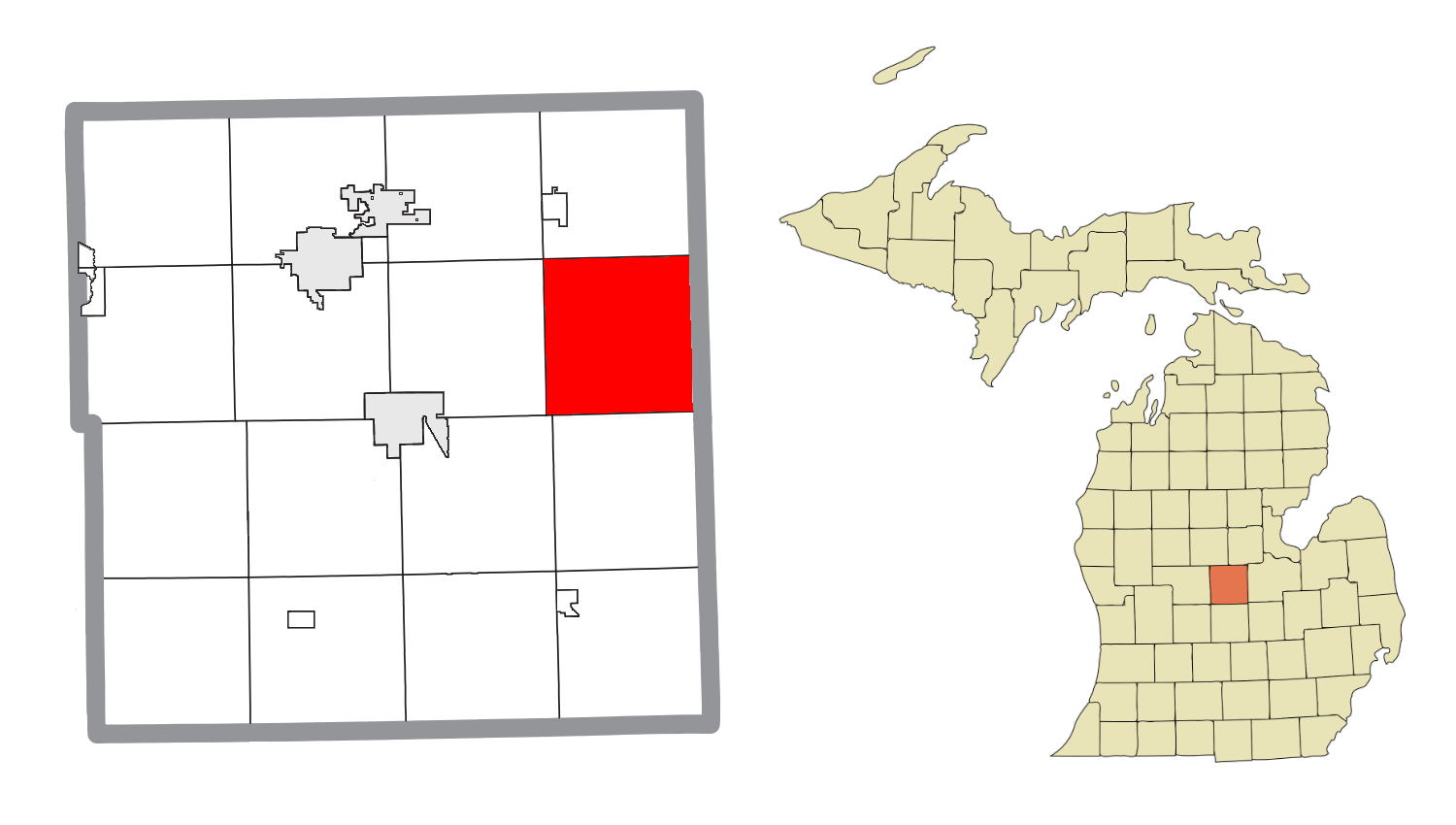
- Location within Gratiot County

- Location within the state of Michigan Location within the United States
- Coordinates: 43°20′6″N 84°25′31″W
- Country: United States
- State: Michigan
- County: Gratiot

Area
  - Total: 36.0 sq mi (93.3 km^{2})
  - Land: 36.0 sq mi (93.3 km^{2})
  - Water: 0 sq mi (0.0 km^{2})
- Elevation: 702 ft (214 m)

Population (2020)
  - Total: 516
  - Density: 14.3/sq mi (5.53/km^{2})
- Time zone: UTC-5 (Eastern (EST))
  - Summer (DST): UTC-4 (EDT)
- FIPS code: 26-44080
- GNIS feature ID: 1626568
- Website: https://www.lafayettetwp.com

Lafayette Township is a civil township of Gratiot County in the U.S. state of Michigan. The population was 516 at the 2020 census.

== Communities ==
- Edgewood is an unincorporated community in the township on the Bad River at 43°17′31″N 84°25′44″W.
- Galloway is an unincorporated community on the boundary between Lafayette Township and Lakefield Township in Saginaw County.
- Langport is an unincorporated community in the township at 43°21′54″N 84°23′23″W.
- Rathbone is an unincorporated community in the township 43°20′09″N 84°25′47″W.

== Geography ==
According to the United States Census Bureau, the township has a total area of 36.0 square miles (93 km^{2}), all land.

== Demographics ==
As of the census of 2000, there were 656 people, 239 households, and 184 families residing in the township. The population density was 18.2 inhabitants per square mile (7.0/km^{2}). There were 261 housing units at an average density of 7.2 per square mile (2.8/km^{2}). The racial makeup of the township was 95.43% White, 0.30% African American, 0.61% Native American, 3.20% from other races, and 0.46% from two or more races. Hispanic or Latino of any race were 4.42% of the population.

There were 239 households, out of which 37.2% had children under the age of 18 living with them, 63.6% were married couples living together, 8.8% had a female householder with no husband present, and 23.0% were non-families. 19.2% of all households were made up of individuals, and 10.5% had someone living alone who was 65 years of age or older. The average household size was 2.69 and the average family size was 3.05.

In the township the population was spread out, with 27.1% under the age of 18, 9.5% from 18 to 24, 30.3% from 25 to 44, 19.2% from 45 to 64, and 13.9% who were 65 years of age or older. The median age was 36 years. For every 100 females, there were 106.9 males. For every 100 females age 18 and over, there were 101.7 males.

The median income for a household in the township was $43,229, and the median income for a family was $45,703. Males had a median income of $37,292 versus $21,563 for females. The per capita income for the township was $17,203. About 3.9% of families and 6.0% of the population were below the poverty line, including 1.8% of those under age 18 and 8.0% of those age 65 or over.
