= Lakefield Township, Saginaw County, Michigan =

Lakefield Township, Michigan
- Civil township
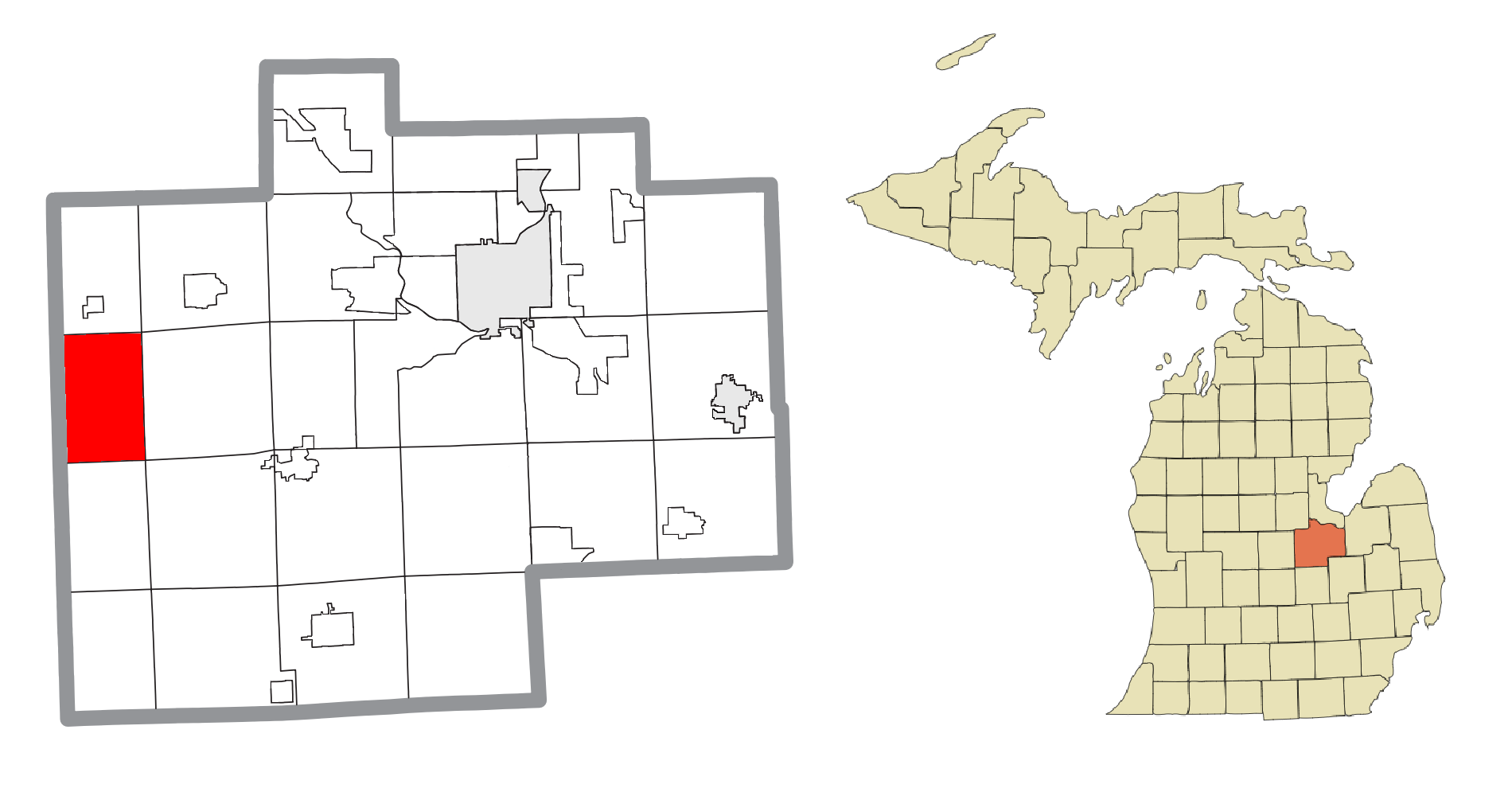
- Location within Saginaw County

- Location within the state of Michigan Lakefield Township (the United States)
- Coordinates: 43°20′40″N 84°20′22″W
- Country: United States
- State: Michigan
- County: Saginaw

Government
  - Supervisor: Terry Crevia
  - Clerk: Tracey Slodowski

Area
  - Total: 24.1 sq mi (62.4 km^{2})
  - Land: 24.1 sq mi (62.4 km^{2})
  - Water: 0 sq mi (0.0 km^{2})
- Elevation: 669 ft (204 m)

Population (2020)
  - Total: 894
  - Density: 37.1/sq mi (14.3/km^{2})
- Time zone: UTC-5 (Eastern (EST))
  - Summer (DST): UTC-4 (EDT)
- ZIP code(s): 48637 (Merrill); 48655 (St. Charles)
- Area code: 989
- FIPS code: 26-44560
- GNIS feature ID: 1626583
- Website: Official website

Lakefield Township is a civil township of Saginaw County, Michigan, United States. The population was 894 at the 2020 Census.

== Communities ==
- Galloway is an unincorporated community on the boundary between Lakefield Township in Saginaw County and Lafayette Township in Gratiot County.
- Lakefield is an unincorporated community in the township at Lakefield and Merrill Roads. A post office operated from July 15, 1892, until September 14, 1903.

== Geography ==
According to the United States Census Bureau, the township has a total area of 24.1 square miles (62 km^{2}), all land.

== Demographics ==
As of the census of 2000, there were 1,030 people, 357 households, and 293 families residing in the township. The population density was 42.7 inhabitants per square mile (16.5/km^{2}). There were 369 housing units at an average density of 15.3 per square mile (5.9/km^{2}). The racial makeup of the township was 96.70% White, 0.19% African American, 0.10% Native American, 0.29% Asian, 1.26% from other races, and 1.46% from two or more races. Hispanic or Latino of any race were 3.88% of the population.

There were 357 households, out of which 38.4% had children under the age of 18 living with them, 76.5% were married couples living together, 4.2% had a female householder with no husband present, and 17.9% were non-families. 13.7% of all households were made up of individuals, and 7.0% had someone living alone who was 65 years of age or older. The average household size was 2.89 and the average family size was 3.22.

In the township the population was spread out, with 27.3% under the age of 18, 7.4% from 18 to 24, 28.5% from 25 to 44, 26.4% from 45 to 64, and 10.4% who were 65 years of age or older. The median age was 37 years. For every 100 females, there were 92.9 males. For every 100 females age 18 and over, there were 99.7 males.

The median income for a household in the township was $44,500, and the median income for a family was $49,306. Males had a median income of $38,750 versus $26,731 for females. The per capita income for the township was $22,265. About 4.4% of families and 5.9% of the population were below the poverty line, including 4.8% of those under age 18 and 10.7% of those age 65 or over.
