= Kristen McDonald Rivet =

American politician (born 1970)

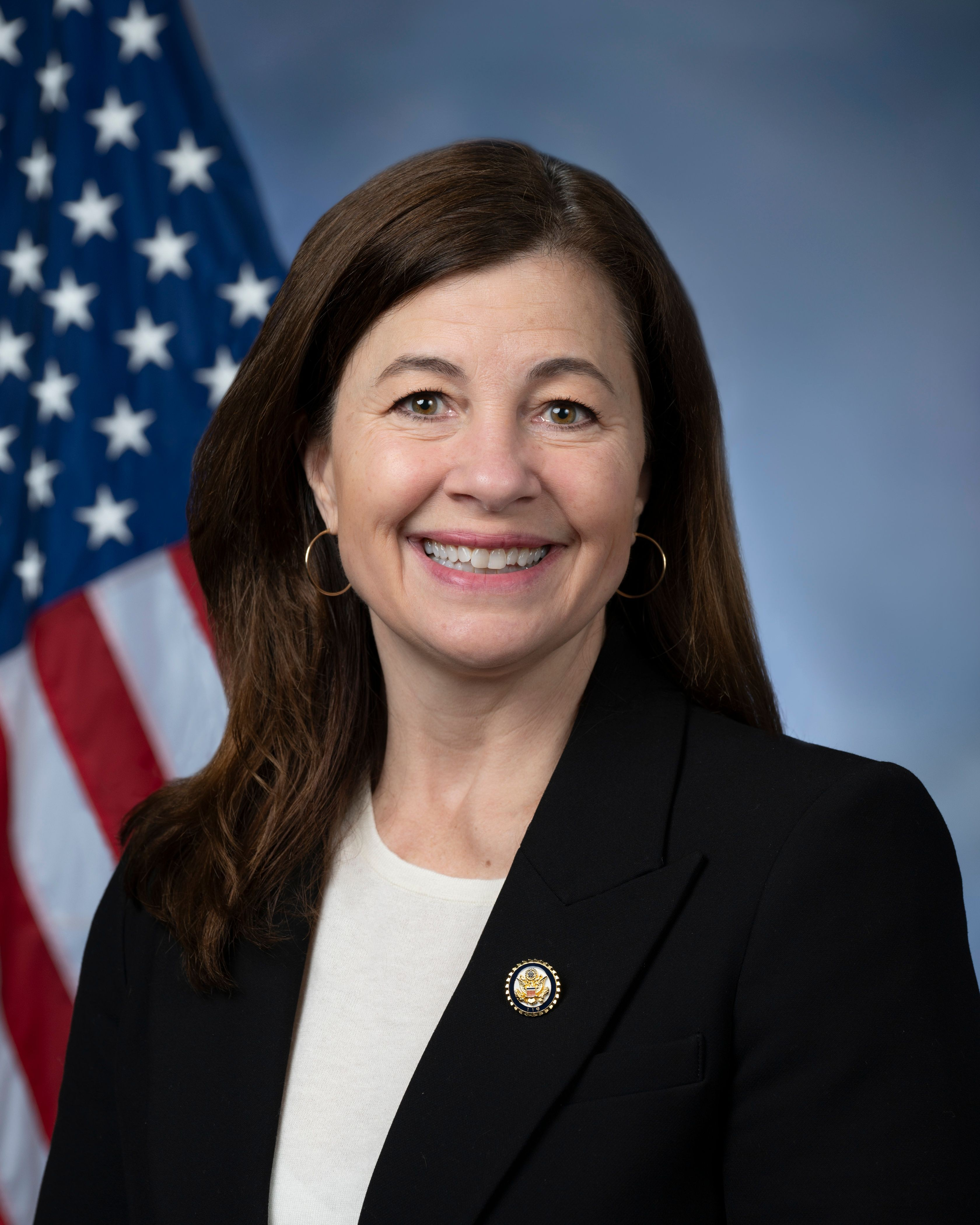
- Official portrait, 2025

Member of the U.S. House of Representatives from Michigan's 8th district
- Incumbent
- Assumed office January 3, 2025
- Preceded by: Dan Kildee

Member of the Michigan Senate from the 35th district
- In office January 1, 2023 – January 3, 2025
- Preceded by: Curt VanderWall
- Succeeded by: Chedrick Greene

Personal details
- Born: Kristen Lee McDonald; July 11, 1970 (age 56) Portland, Michigan, U.S.
- Party: Democratic
- Spouse: Joseph Rivet
- Children: 6
- Relatives: Karen McDonald (sister)
- Education: Michigan State University (BA); University of Michigan, Flint (MPA)
- Website: House website Campaign website

Kristen Lee McDonald Rivet (/ˈrɪvɪt/; born July 11, 1970) is an American politician who has served as the U.S. representative for Michigan's 8th congressional district since 2025. A member of the Democratic Party, she previously served in the Michigan Senate for the 35th district, where she was the assistant majority floor leader from 2023 to 2025. Her district, located in Central Michigan, includes Flint and the Tri-Cities metropolitan area of Saginaw, Midland, and Bay City.

== Early life and education ==
McDonald Rivet was born on July 11, 1970, in Portland, Michigan, where she was raised with her fraternal twin sister, Karen McDonald, and an older sister. Her father was a construction worker, while her mother stayed home to raise the children.

She went to Portland High School and then earned a Bachelor of Arts degree in history from Michigan State University in 1992. She later earned a master's degree in public administration and education from the University of Michigan–Flint in 2010.

== Career ==
Before entering politics, McDonald Rivet served as the executive director of Michigan Head Start. She later worked in the Michigan department of human services and as the chief of staff for State Superintendent Michael P. Flanagan.

She went on to become the vice president of the Skillman Foundation and later served as president and chief executive officer of Greater Midlands Inc. She also worked at the Michigan Health Improvement Alliance and Michigan Future Inc.

McDonald Rivet's first elected position was as a member of the Charter Commission for Bay City, Michigan. She was subsequently elected to the Bay City Commission, representing the city's 2nd ward.

== Michigan Senate ==
McDonald Rivet was elected to the Michigan Senate in November 2022, defeating Republican state Representative Annette Glenn. She represented the state's 35th district and was the assistant majority floor leader. She served on the appropriations, economic and community development, education, energy and environment committees, and on several budget subcommittees.

Her first bill proposed expanding the state's Working Families Tax Credit from six percent to thirty percent of the federal Earned Income Tax Credit for 700,000 households. The Senate passed the bill with seven Republicans joining Democrats. The expansion was enacted in March 2023. She subsequently introduced the Child Care for All legislative package to expand access to affordable child care in the state.

Earlier in her tenure, she sponsored and helped pass legislation requiring the safe storage of firearms, part of a broader legislative package in response to the 2021 Oxford High School and 2023 Michigan State University mass shootings. She also voted to repeal Michigan's 1931 abortion ban and for the state's Reproductive Health Act, which removed several regulations on abortion providers.

== U.S. House of Representatives ==
=== Elections ===
==== 2024 ====
Michigan's 8th district, since 2023

In January 2024, McDonald Rivet declared her candidacy to run for the United States House of Representatives for Michigan's 8th congressional district to replace the retiring Dan Kildee in the 2024 Democratic primary. She campaigned on economic security and family-focused issues, won the Democratic primary, and defeated Republican Paul Junge in the general election. Although Donald Trump carried the district by two points in the presidential race, McDonald Rivet won by nearly seven points.

==== 2026 ====
After initially considering a run for the open senate seat, McDonald Rivet announced in April 2025 that she would seek reelection to the House. She was unopposed in the Democratic primary in her reelection bid. The district is one of the Democratic-held seats that Trump carried in 2024, when he won it 50% to 48%.

=== Tenure ===
McDonald Rivet took office on January 3, 2025, representing Michigan’s 8th congressional district. She was appointed to the Committee on Agriculture and the Committee on Transportation and Infrastructure, and was selected as the Freshman Leadership Representative for the New Democrat Coalition.

In 2025, McDonald Rivet was one of 46 House Democrats who joined all Republicans to vote for the Laken Riley Act, requiring mandatory detention without bail of undocumented immigrants charged with a crime, even if they are not convicted. Defending her vote, she said the country needed an immigration system that is "fair, fast and finite" and that people who commit violent crimes should face deportation proceedings. She voted against the final passage of the One Big Beautiful Bill Act, the Republican tax and spending package, which passed along party lines. She said that she would not vote to reopen the government during the 2025 United States federal government shutdown without an extension of the Affordable Care Act premium tax credits.

As a member of the Agriculture Committee, she co-sponsored the bipartisan Foreign Agricultural Restrictions to Maintain Local Agriculture and National Defense (FARMLAND) Act, which was designed to expand the authority of the Committee on Foreign Investment in the United States to review foreign purchases of U.S. farmland, particularly those involving entities connected to China. She also introduced the Susan Muffley Act of 2025 to restore pension benefits to 21,000 salaried retirees from Delphi, an auto parts supplier with former operations in Saginaw, Michigan, which went bankrupt during the 2008 financial crisis. In March 2025, she worked with Republican John James to sponsor the Prescription Drug Transparency and Affordability Act, which would require pharmacy benefit management to disclose rebates and other financial arrangements that could alter drug prices for Americans. In May 2025, she and Debbie Dingell became the Democratic co-chairs of the bipartisan congressional PFAS task force, with Republicans Brian Fitzpatrick and Jen Kiggans.

The House passed her first bill in July 2025, the Great Lakes Icebreaker Act, which directed the Coast Guard to develop a plan to design and build a new Great Lakes icebreaker and to perform a full assessment of the current operational status of the existing icebreaking fleet. The measure was signed into law in December 2025 as part of the annual National Defense Authorization Act.

In April 2026, she introduced the Working Parents Tax Relief Act, which would create a $5,500 annual tax credit for every child aged three and below for families that earned up to almost $100,000, modeled on Michigan's Working Families Tax Credit. She co-sponsored a bill which would ban lawmakers and judges from making trades with individual stocks.

In June 2026, McDonald Rivet was one of 10 House Democrats to join the pro-capitalist, anti-socialist initiative, Promise to America after three candidates backed by the Democratic Socialists of America won Democratic congressional primaries.

=== Committee assignments ===
For the 119th Congress:

- Committee on Agriculture
  - Subcommittee on General Farm Commodities, Risk Management, and Credit
  - Subcommittee on Commodity Markets, Digital Assets, and Rural Development
- Committee on Transportation and Infrastructure
  - Subcommittee on Economic Development, Public Buildings and Emergency Management
  - Subcommittee on Highways and Transit

=== Caucus membership ===
- Congressional Equality Caucus
- New Democrat Coalition
- Labor Caucus
- Blue Dog Coalition

== Political positions ==
=== Economic policy and taxes ===
McDonald Rivet sponsored the 2023 expansion of Michigan's earned income tax credit during her time in the state senate. She has criticized President Trump’s tariffs, saying that they cost Michigan families about $1,500 a year. She voted against the One Big Beautiful Bill Act in 2025.

=== Health care ===
She supports extending the Affordable Care Act's enhanced premium tax credits which cut the costs of premiums for some people on the marketplace, and said during the 2025 shutdown that she would not vote to fund the government without them being reenacted. She has co-sponsored bipartisan legislation requiring pharmacy benefit managers to disclose rebates and pricing arrangements.

=== Immigration ===
In 2025, she was one of the 46 House Democrats that voted in favor of the Laken Riley Act. She said that the country needs a "fair, fast and finite" immigration system in the explanation for her vote.

=== Abortion ===
She supports abortion rights and helped to push for Proposal 3 which led to reproductive freedom in the state. As a state senator she voted to repeal Michigan's 1931 abortion ban and for the Reproductive Health Act, and during her first congressional campaign she said she opposed a federal abortion ban.

=== Gun policy ===
In the Michigan Senate, she sponsored part of the state's 2023 safe firearm storage law.

== Personal life ==
McDonald Rivet is married to Joseph Rivet, a former three-term member of the Michigan House of Representatives and Bay County commissioner. They have six children and live in Bay City, Michigan. She is Catholic.

== Electoral history ==
Michigan's 8th congressional district, 2024
Party	Candidate	Votes	%
Democratic	Kristen McDonald Rivet	217,490	51.3
Republican	Paul Junge	189,317	44.6
Working Class	Kathy Goodwin	8,492	2.0
Libertarian	Steve Barcelo	4,768	1.1
Constitution	James Allen Little	2,681	0.6
Green	Jim Casha	1,602	0.4
Total votes		424,350	100.0
Democratic hold			

Michigan's 35th state Senate District General Election, 2022
Party	Candidate	Votes	%
Democratic	Kristen McDonald Rivet	62,105	53.4
Republican	Annette Glenn	54,246	46.6
Total votes		116,351	100.0
Democratic gain from Republican			

U.S. House of Representatives
Preceded by Dan Kildee	Member of the U.S. House of Representatives from Michigan's 8th congressional district 2025–present	Incumbent
U.S. order of precedence (ceremonial)
Preceded by April McClain Delaney	United States representatives by seniority 401st	Succeeded by Addison McDowell
