= 2014 United States House of Representatives elections in Michigan =

- November 4, 2014

All 14 Michigan seats to the United States House of Representatives
	Majority party	Minority party
Party	Republican	Democratic
Last election	9	5
Seats won	9	5
Seat change	Steady	Steady
Popular vote	1,466,749	1,519,030
Percentage	47.48%	49.17%
Swing	▲1.86%	▼1.72%

Republican
40–50%
50–60%
60–70%
70–80%
Democratic
40–50%
50–60%
60–70%
70–80%

The 2014 U.S. House of Representatives elections in Michigan were held on Tuesday, November 4, 2014, to elect the 14 members of the U.S. House of Representatives from the state of Michigan, one from each of the state's 14 congressional districts. The elections coincided with the elections of other federal and state offices, including the election of Michigan's governor, as well as the Class 2 U.S. Senate Seat.

Primary elections to determine major party nominees for the general election were held Tuesday, August 5, 2014, and the partisan filing deadline was Tuesday, April 22, 2014. The members of Congress elected at this election served in the 114th Congress. According to the Rothenberg Political Report, all of Michigan's congressional seats except for the 1st, 7th, 8th, and 11th districts were considered "safe" for the party of the incumbent.

Michigan was the only state where the party that won the most seats did not win the popular vote in the state in 2014.

== Overview ==
United States House of Representatives elections in Michigan, 2014
Party	Votes	Percentage	Seats before	Seats after	+/–
Democratic	1,519,030	49.17%	5	5	-
Republican	1,466,749	47.48%	9	9	-
Libertarian	53,711	1.74%	0	0	-
Green	23,088	0.75%	0	0	-
Independents	14,315	0.46%	0	0	-
U.S. Taxpayers	10,904	0.35%	0	0	-
Natural Law	1,680	0.05%	0	0	-
Total	3,089,477	100.00%	14	14	0

Popular vote
Democratic	49.17%
Republican	47.48%
Libertarian Party	1.74%
Other	1.56%

House seats
Republican	64.28%
Democratic	35.71%

=== District ===
Results of the 2014 United States House of Representatives elections in Michigan by district:

District	Democratic		Republican		Others		Total		Result
District	Votes	%	Votes	%	Votes	%	Votes	%	Result
District 1	113,263	45.28%	130,414	52.14%	6,454	2.58%	250,131	100.00%	Republican hold
District 2	70,851	33.25%	135,568	63.63%	6,653	3.12%	213,072	100.00%	Republican hold
District 3	84,720	39.01%	125,754	57.91%	6,691	3.08%	217,165	100.00%	Republican hold
District 4	85,777	39.09%	123,962	56.50%	9,684	4.41%	219,423	100.00%	Republican hold
District 5	148,182	66.71%	69,222	31.16%	4,734	2.13%	222,138	100.00%	Democratic hold
District 6	84,391	40.38%	116,801	55.89%	7,784	3.73%	208,976	100.00%	Republican hold
District 7	92,083	41.17%	119,564	53.45%	12,038	5.38%	223,685	100.00%	Republican hold
District 8	102,269	42.06%	132,739	54.60%	8,117	3.34%	243,125	100.00%	Republican hold
District 9	136,342	60.39%	81,470	36.09%	7,945	3.52%	225,757	100.00%	Democratic hold
District 10	67,143	29.36%	157,069	68.68%	4,480	1.96%	228,692	100.00%	Republican hold
District 11	101,681	40.47%	140,435	55.90%	9,122	3.63%	251,238	100.00%	Republican hold
District 12	134,346	65.01%	64,716	31.32%	7,598	3.68%	206,660	100.00%	Democratic hold
District 13	132,710	79.49%	27,234	16.31%	7,003	4.20%	166,947	100.00%	Democratic hold
District 14	165,272	77.79%	41,801	19.67%	5,395	2.54%	212,468	100.00%	Democratic hold
Total	1,519,030	49.17%	1,466,749	47.47%	103,698	3.36%	3,089,477	100.00%	

== District 1 ==
2014 Michigan's 1st congressional district election
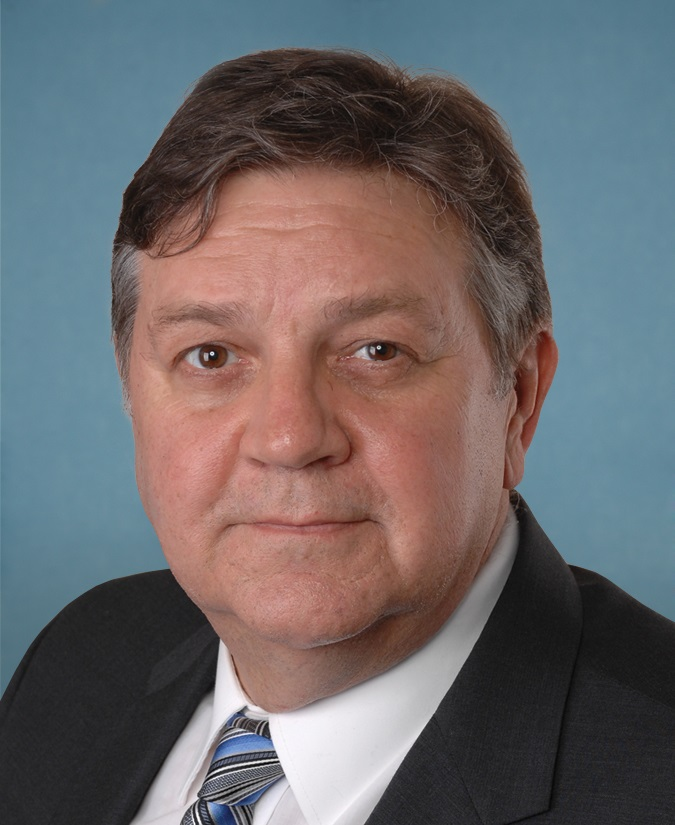

Nominee	Dan Benishek	Jerry Cannon
Party	Republican	Democratic
Popular vote	130,414	113,263
Percentage	52.1%	45.3%
- Benishek: 40–50% 50–60% 60–70% 70–80% Cannon: 40–50% 50–60% 60–70% 70–80% Tie 40–50%
U.S. Representative before election
Dan Benishek
Republican
Elected U.S. Representative
Dan Benishek
Republican

The 1st district includes the entire Upper Peninsula of Michigan and part of the Lower Peninsula. The district, which makes up about 44% of the land area of the state of Michigan, is the second-largest congressional district east of the Mississippi River by land area. The incumbent was Republican Dan Benishek, who had represented the district since 2011. He was re-elected with 48% of the vote in 2012 and the district has a PVI of R+5.

Benishek was re-elected in 2012 with 48.14% of the total votes cast, defeating Democratic former State Representative Gary McDowell by less than 2,000 votes in a field where two third-party candidates received a combined 4.3 percent of the vote. As of September 30, 2013, Benishek had raised $676,545.98, and had $500,163.86 cash on-hand toward a presumed re-election bid.

=== Republican primary ===
==== Candidates ====
===== Nominee =====
- Dan Benishek, incumbent U.S. Representative

===== Eliminated in primary =====
- Alan Arcand, businessman, United States Air Force veteran and delegate to the 2012 Republican National Convention

==== Results ====
Republican primary results
Party	Candidate	Votes	%
Republican	Dan Benishek (incumbent)	49,540	69.7
Republican	Alan Arcand	21,497	30.3
Total votes		71,037	100.0

=== Democratic primary ===
Former Kalkaska County Sheriff Jerry Cannon was recruited by Michigan Democratic Party Chairman Lon Johnson to challenge Benishek.

==== Candidates ====
===== Nominee =====
- Jerry Cannon, retired Michigan Army National Guard Major General and former Kalkaska County Sheriff

===== Failed to qualify =====
- Kevin Glover

===== Declined =====
- Gary McDowell, former state representative and nominee for this seat in 2010 & 2012

==== Results ====
Democratic primary results
Party	Candidate	Votes	%
Democratic	Jerry Cannon	31,104	100.0

=== General election ===
==== Endorsements ====
Dan Benishek (R)

Organizations

- National Republican Congressional Committee "Patriot" Program
- National Right to Life Committee
- NRA Political Victory Fund
- Tea Party Express
Jerry Cannon (D)

Labor unions

- AFL-CIO
- National Association of Letter Carriers

Organizations

- Democratic Congressional Campaign Committee "Jumpstart" Program
- Sierra Club
- VoteVets

Newspapers

- Detroit Free Press

==== Predictions ====
Source	Ranking	As of
The Cook Political Report	Likely R	November 3, 2014
Rothenberg	Lean R	October 24, 2014
Sabato's Crystal Ball	Likely R	October 30, 2014
RCP	Likely R	November 2, 2014
Daily Kos Elections	Lean R	November 4, 2014

==== Results ====
Michigan's 1st congressional district, 2014
Party	Candidate	Votes	%
Republican	Dan Benishek (incumbent)	130,414	52.1
Democratic	Jerry Cannon	113,263	45.3
Libertarian	Loel Gnadt	3,823	1.5
Green	Ellis Boal	2,631	1.1
Total votes		250,131	100.0
Republican hold			

== District 2 ==
2014 Michigan's 2nd congressional district election
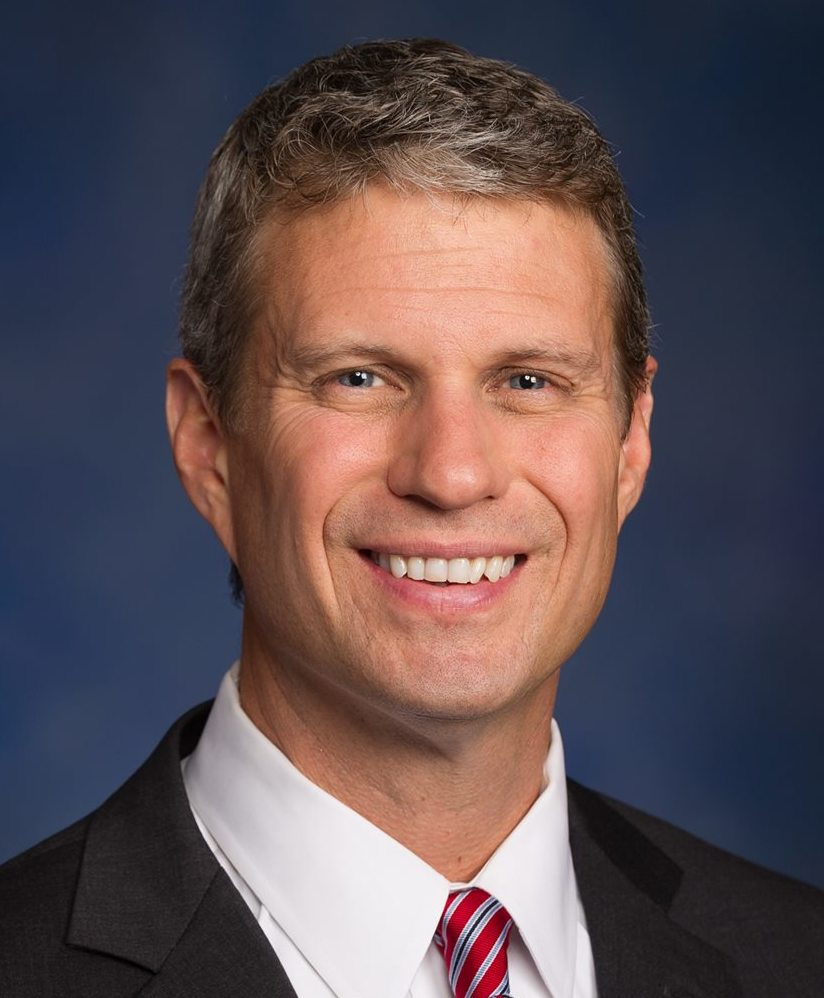

Nominee	Bill Huizenga	Dean Vanderstelt
Party	Republican	Democratic
Popular vote	135,568	70,851
Percentage	63.6%	33.3%
- Huizenga: 40–50% 50–60% 60–70% 70–80% 80–90% >90% Vanderstelt: 40–50% 50–60% 60–70% 70–80% 80–90% >90% Tie: 40–50% No votes
U.S. Representative before election
Bill Huizenga
Republican
Elected U.S. Representative
Bill Huizenga
Republican

The 2nd district is located in West Michigan. The incumbent was Republican Bill Huizenga, who had represented the district since 2011. He was re-elected with 61% of the vote in 2012 and the district has a PVI of R+7.

As of September 30, 2013, Huizenga had raised $537,109.30 for the 2014 election cycle, and had $402,388.39 cash on-hand available toward a presumed re-election bid.

=== Republican primary ===
==== Candidates ====
===== Nominee =====
- Bill Huizenga, incumbent U.S. Representative

==== Results ====
Republican primary results
Party	Candidate	Votes	%
Republican	Bill Huizenga (incumbent)	54,416	100.0

=== Democratic primary ===
==== Candidates ====
===== Nominee =====
- Dean Vanderstelt, retired business executive

==== Results ====
Democratic primary results
Party	Candidate	Votes	%
Democratic	Dean Vanderstelt	19,957	100.0

=== General election ===
==== Endorsements ====
Bill Huizenga (R)

Organizations

- National Right to Life Committee
- NRA Political Victory Fund
Dean Vanderstelt (D)

Labor unions

- AFL-CIO

==== Predictions ====
Source	Ranking	As of
The Cook Political Report	Safe R	November 3, 2014
Rothenberg	Safe R	October 24, 2014
Sabato's Crystal Ball	Safe R	October 30, 2014
RCP	Safe R	November 2, 2014
Daily Kos Elections	Safe R	November 4, 2014

==== Results ====
Michigan's 2nd congressional district, 2014
Party	Candidate	Votes	%
Republican	Bill Huizenga (incumbent)	135,568	63.6
Democratic	Dean Vanderstelt	70,851	33.3
Libertarian	Ronald Welch II	3,877	1.8
U.S. Taxpayers'	Ronald Graeser	2,776	1.3
Total votes		213,072	100.0
Republican hold			

== District 3 ==
2014 Michigan's 3rd congressional district election
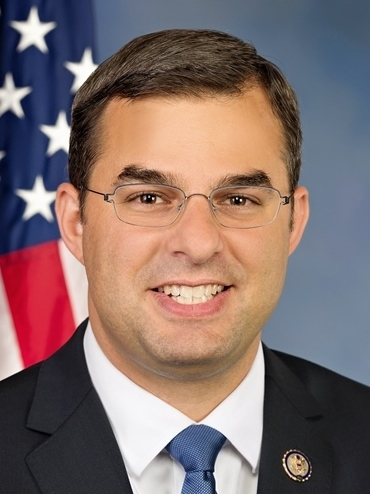

Nominee	Justin Amash	Bob Goodrich
Party	Republican	Democratic
Popular vote	125,754	84,720
Percentage	57.9%	39.0%
- Amash: 40–50% 50–60% 60–70% 70–80% 80–90% Goodrich: 40–50% 50–60% 60–70% 70–80% 80–90% >90% Duncan: >90% Tie: 50% No votes
U.S. Representative before election
Justin Amash
Republican
Elected U.S. Representative
Justin Amash
Republican

The 3rd district is located in West Michigan. The incumbent was Republican Justin Amash, who had represented the district since 2011. He was re-elected with 53% of the vote in 2012 and the district has a PVI of R+4.

As of September 30, 2013, Amash had raised $555,863.56 for the 2014 election cycle, and had $313,844.71 cash on-hand available toward a presumed re-election bid. In September 2013, Amash ended months of speculation regarding whether he would run for the U.S. Senate seat being vacated by Carl Levin, choosing instead to run for re-election to his House seat. Amash faced a primary challenge from investment manager Brian Ellis. Amash defeated Ellis in the Republican primary.

=== Republican primary ===
==== Candidates ====
===== Nominee =====
- Justin Amash, incumbent U.S. Representative

===== Eliminated in primary =====
- Brian Ellis, investment manager

===== Declined =====
- Mark Jansen, state senator

==== Polling ====
Poll source	Date(s) administered	Sample size	Margin of error	Justin Amash	Brian Ellis	Undecided
Strategic National	July 29, 2014	532	± 4.2%	51%	31%	18%
Strategic National	July 14, 2014	500	± 4.4%	47%	24%	29%
EPIC-MRA	June 10–11, 2014	814	± 3.5%	55%	35%	10%
Practical Political Consulting	May 27–29, 2014	472	± 4.5%	42%	23%	35%
The Polling Company	May 2014	–	–	53%	23%	22%
Basswood Research	February 6, 2014	300	± 5.6%	60%	12%	28%

==== Results ====
Republican primary results
Party	Candidate	Votes	%
Republican	Justin Amash (incumbent)	39,706	57.4
Republican	Brian Ellis	29,422	42.6
Total votes		69,128	100.0

=== Democratic primary ===
==== Candidates ====
===== Nominee =====
- Bob Goodrich, president and CEO of Goodrich Quality Theaters

===== Failed to qualify =====
- Richard A. Abbott

==== Results ====
Democratic primary results
Party	Candidate	Votes	%
Democratic	Bob Goodrich	20,378	100.0

=== General election ===
==== Endorsements ====
Justin Amash (R)

Organizations

- Club for Growth
- National Right to Life Committee
- Republican Liberty Caucus
- Tea Party Express
Bob Goodrich (D)

Labor unions

- AFL-CIO

==== Predictions ====
Source	Ranking	As of
The Cook Political Report	Safe R	November 3, 2014
Rothenberg	Safe R	October 24, 2014
Sabato's Crystal Ball	Safe R	October 30, 2014
RCP	Safe R	November 2, 2014
Daily Kos Elections	Safe R	November 4, 2014

==== Results ====
Michigan's 3rd congressional district, 2014
Party	Candidate	Votes	%
Republican	Justin Amash (incumbent)	125,754	57.9
Democratic	Bob Goodrich	84,720	39.0
Green	Tonya Duncan	6,691	3.1
Total votes		217,165	100.0
Republican hold			

== District 4 ==
2014 Michigan's 4th congressional district election
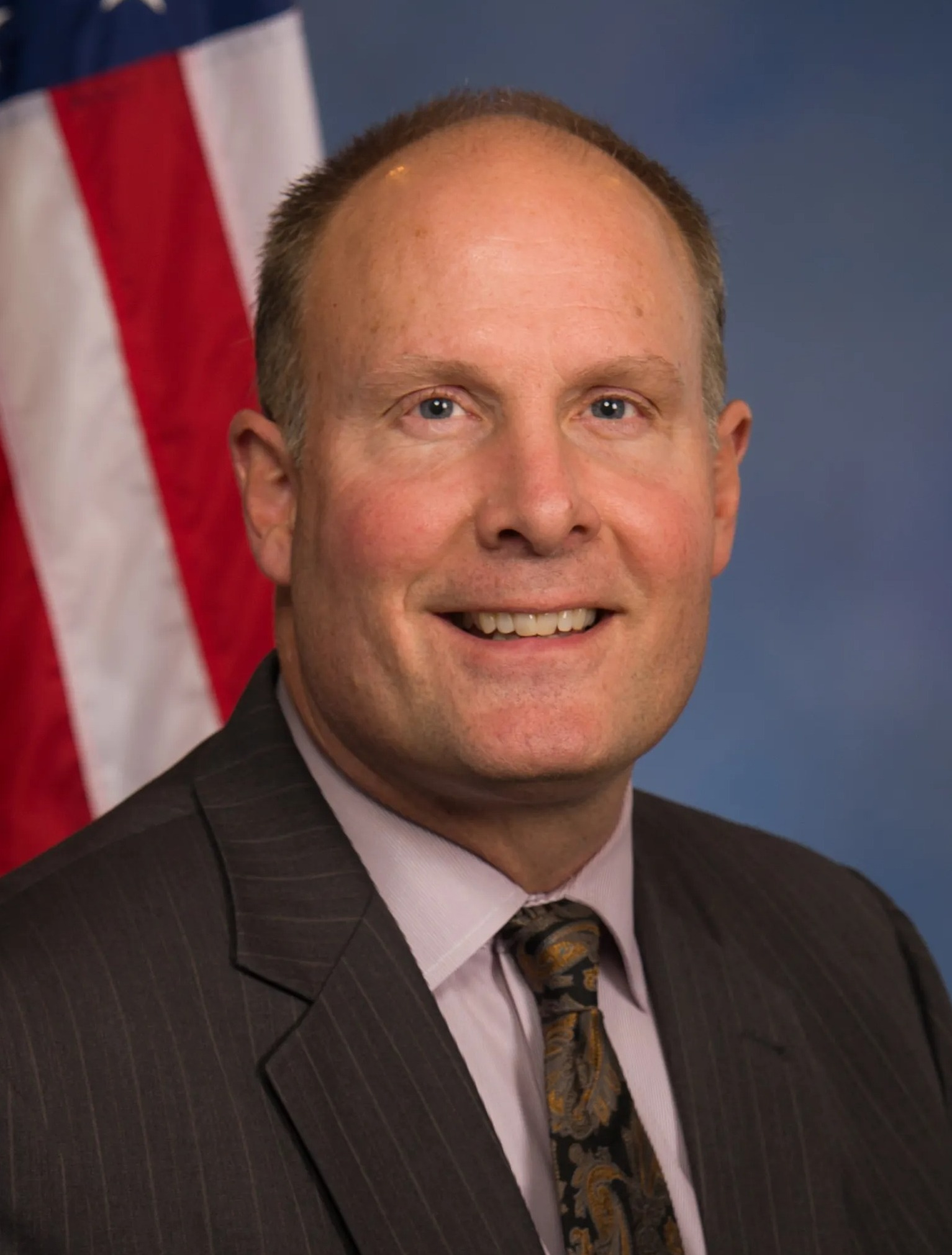

Nominee	John Moolenaar	Jeff Holmes
Party	Republican	Democratic
Popular vote	123,962	85,777
Percentage	56.5%	39.1%
- Moolenaar: 40–50% 50–60% 60–70% 70–80% 80–90% Holmes: 40–50% 50–60% 60–70% Tie: 40–50% No votes
U.S. Representative before election
Dave Camp
Republican
Elected U.S. Representative
John Moolenaar
Republican

The 4th district is located in Northern and Central Michigan. The incumbent was Republican Dave Camp, who had represented the district since 1993 and previously represented the 10th district from 1991 to 1993. He was re-elected with 63% of the vote in 2012 and the district has a PVI of R+5.

As of September 30, 2013, Camp had raised $1,607,226.02 for the 2014 election cycle, and had $3,198,099.13 cash on-hand available for a presumed re-election bid. In July 2013, Camp announced he was considering running for the U.S. Senate to replace the retiring incumbent Carl Levin, but then the following month announced that he would not do so. In March 2014, he announced that he would not run for re-election. State senator John Moolenaar was the winner of the Republican primary.

=== Republican primary ===
==== Candidates ====
===== Nominee =====
- John Moolenaar, state senator

===== Eliminated in primary =====
- Peter Konetchy, software business owner
- Paul Mitchell, businessman and Finance Chairman of the Michigan Republican Party

===== Declined =====
- Darwin L. Booher, state senator
- Brian Calley, Lieutenant Governor of Michigan (running for re-election)
- Dave Camp, incumbent U.S. Representative
- Gary Glenn, conservative activist and candidate for the U.S. Senate in 2012
- Roger Kahn, state senator
- Bill Schuette, Michigan Attorney General (running for re-election)
- Jim Stamas, Majority Leader of the Michigan House of Representatives (running for the state senate)

==== Polling ====
Poll source	Date(s) administered	Sample size	Margin of error	Peter Konetchy	Paul Mitchell	John Moolenaar	Undecided
Mitchell Research	July 29–30, 2014	492	± 4.42%	9%	38%	38%	15%
Strategic National	July 29, 2014	540	± 4.2%	10.63%	35%	34%	20%
EPIC-MRA	July 12–13, 2014	802	± 3.5%	7%	50%	27%	16%

==== Results ====
Republican primary results
Party	Candidate	Votes	%
Republican	John Moolenaar	34,399	52.4
Republican	Paul Mitchell	23,844	36.3
Republican	Peter Konetchy	7,408	11.3
Total votes		65,651	100.0

=== Democratic primary ===
==== Candidates ====
===== Nominee =====
- Jeff Holmes, physician

===== Withdrawn =====
- John Barker, former Union Township Supervisor

===== Declined =====
- James A. Barcia, former U.S. Representative
- Bill Federspiel, Saginaw County Sheriff
- Tom Hickner, Bay County Executive
- Dale Sheltrown, former state representative
- Joel Sheltrown, former state representative

==== Results ====
Democratic primary results
Party	Candidate	Votes	%
Democratic	Jeff Holmes	23,496	100.0

=== General election ===
==== Endorsements ====
John Moolenaar (R)

Organizations

- National Republican Congressional Committee "Young Guns" Program
- National Right to Life Committee
- NRA Political Victory Fund
- Tea Party Express
Jeff Holmes (D)

Labor unions

- AFL-CIO

Organizations

- National Organization for Women

==== Predictions ====
Source	Ranking	As of
The Cook Political Report	Safe R	November 3, 2014
Rothenberg	Safe R	October 24, 2014
Sabato's Crystal Ball	Safe R	October 30, 2014
RCP	Safe R	November 2, 2014
Daily Kos Elections	Likely R	November 4, 2014

==== Results ====
Michigan's 4th congressional district, 2014
Party	Candidate	Votes	%
Republican	John Moolenaar	123,962	56.5
Democratic	Jeff Holmes	85,777	39.1
U.S. Taxpayers'	George Zimmer	4,990	2.3
Libertarian	Will White	4,694	2.1
Total votes		219,423	100.0
Republican hold			

== District 5 ==
2014 Michigan's 5th congressional district election
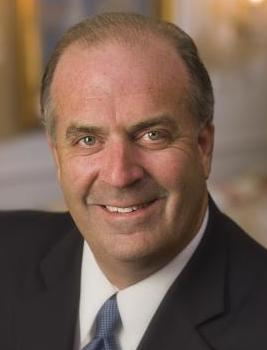

Nominee	Dan Kildee	Allen Hardwick
Party	Democratic	Republican
Popular vote	148,182	69,222
Percentage	66.7%	31.2%
- Kildee: 40–50% 50–60% 60–70% 70–80% 80–90% >90% Hardwick: 40–50% 50–60% 60–70% No votes
U.S. Representative before election
Dan Kildee
Democratic
Elected U.S. Representative
Dan Kildee
Democratic

The 5th district is located in Central Michigan. The incumbent was Democrat Dan Kildee, who had represented the district since 2013. He was elected with 65% of the vote in 2012, succeeding his uncle, Democrat Dale Kildee. The district has a PVI of D+10.

As of September 30, 2013, Kildee had raised $243,246.99 for the 2014 election cycle, and had $210,492.27 cash on-hand available for his re-election bid. He was unopposed in the August primary and would face Republican nominee Allen Hardwick in November.

=== Democratic primary ===
==== Candidates ====
===== Nominee =====
- Dan Kildee, incumbent U.S. Representative

==== Results ====
Democratic primary results
Party	Candidate	Votes	%
Democratic	Daniel Kildee (incumbent)	46,065	100.0

=== Republican primary ===
==== Candidates ====
===== Nominee =====
- Allen Hardwick, computer repairman

===== Eliminated in primary =====
- Tom Whitmire, health consultant

==== Results ====
Republican primary results
Party	Candidate	Votes	%
Republican	Allen Hardwick	13,557	51.3
Republican	Tom Whitmire	12,859	48.7
Total votes		26,426	100.0

=== General election ===
==== Endorsements ====
Dan Kildee (D)

Labor unions

- AFL-CIO
- National Association of Letter Carriers

Organizations

- Equality Michigan
- Human Rights Campaign
- National Organization for Women
- Sierra Club

==== Predictions ====
Source	Ranking	As of
The Cook Political Report	Safe D	November 3, 2014
Rothenberg	Safe D	October 24, 2014
Sabato's Crystal Ball	Safe D	October 30, 2014
RCP	Safe D	November 2, 2014
Daily Kos Elections	Safe D	November 4, 2014

==== Results ====
Michigan's 5th congressional district, 2014
Party	Candidate	Votes	%
Democratic	Dan Kildee (incumbent)	148,182	66.7
Republican	Allen Hardwick	69,222	31.2
Libertarian	Harold Jones	4,734	2.1
Total votes		222,138	100.0
Democratic hold			

== District 6 ==
2014 Michigan's 6th congressional district election
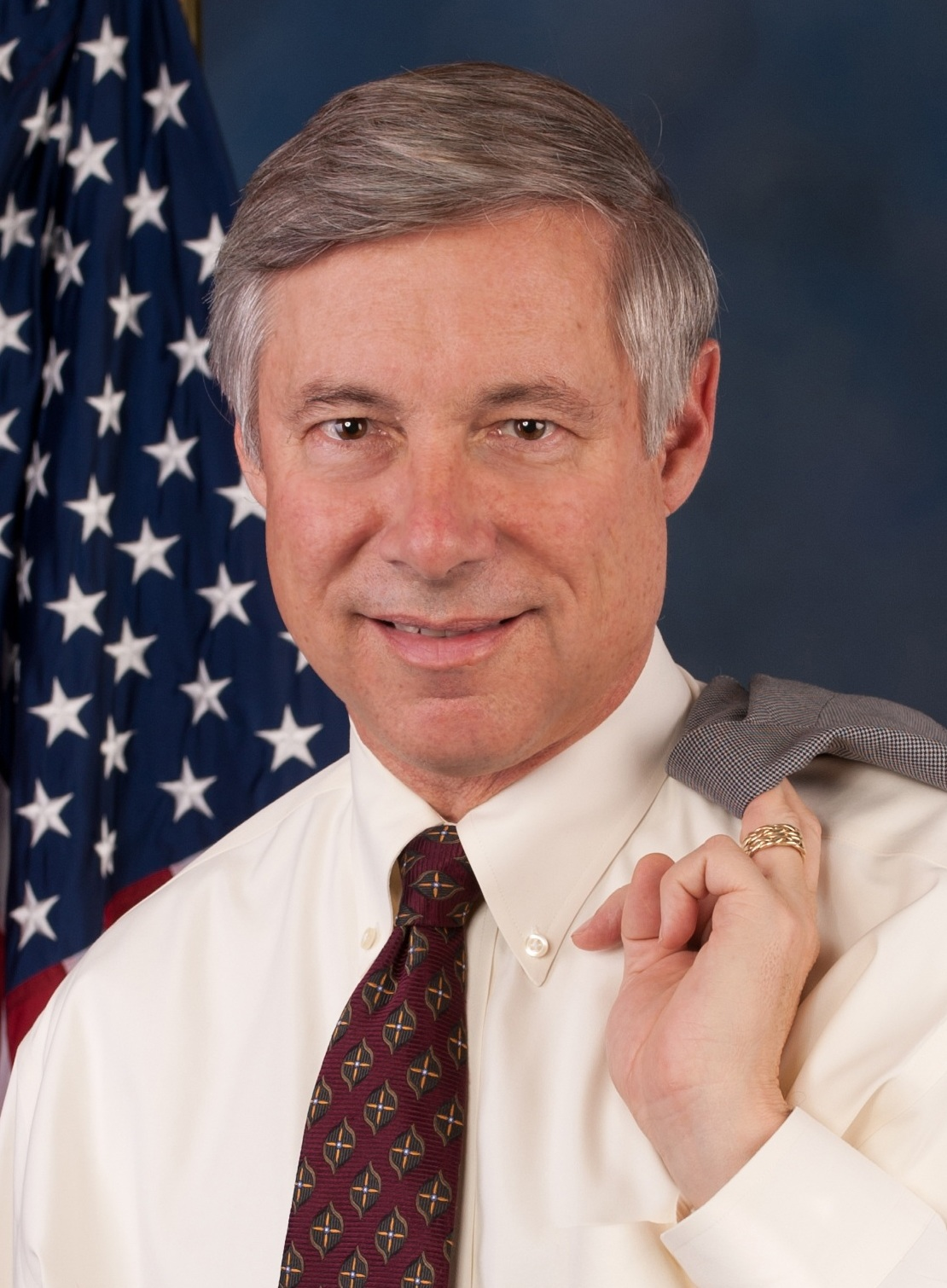

Nominee	Fred Upton	Paul Clements
Party	Republican	Democratic
Popular vote	116,801	84,391
Percentage	55.9%	40.4%
- Upton: 40–50% 50–60% 60–70% 70–80% 80–90% Clements: 40–50% 50–60% 60–70% 70–80% 80–90% >90% No votes
U.S. Representative before election
Fred Upton
Republican
Elected U.S. Representative
Fred Upton
Republican

The 6th district is located in Southwest Michigan. The incumbent was Republican Fred Upton, who had represented the district since 1993 and previously represented the 4th district from 1987 to 1993. He was re-elected with 55% of the vote in 2012 and the district has a PVI of R+1.

As of September 30, 2013, Upton had raised $1,205,296.00 for the 2014 election cycle, and had $893,110.90 cash on-hand available for a presumed re-election bid. Upton was challenged for the Republican primary nomination by registered nurse Jim Bussler.

Paul Clements, a professor at Western Michigan University, ran for the Democratic nomination. Upton won the Republican nomination.

=== Republican primary ===
==== Candidates ====
===== Nominee =====
- Fred Upton, incumbent U.S. Representative

===== Eliminated in primary =====
- Jim Bussler, registered nurse

==== Results ====
Republican primary results
Party	Candidate	Votes	%
Republican	Fred Upton (incumbent)	37,731	71.2
Republican	Jim Bussler	15,283	28.8
Total votes		53,014	100.0

=== Democratic primary ===
==== Candidates ====
===== Nominee =====
- Paul Clements, political science professor

==== Results ====
Democratic primary results
Party	Candidate	Votes	%
Democratic	Paul Clements	19,894	100.0

=== General election ===
==== Campaign ====
Upton's relatively disappointing performance in 2012 (winning with 55%, the smallest margin of his career, after outspending his opponent $4 million to $294,000), Clements' strong fundraising, and outside spending on behalf of Clements prompted speculation that Upton could suffer an upset loss. Even a close win for Upton could persuade him to retire, as happened with Republican Charles E. Chamberlain, who only narrowly defeated Democrat Milton Robert Carr in 1972, retiring in 1974 to be succeeded by Carr.

==== Endorsements ====
Fred Upton (R)

Organizations

- National Right to Life Committee
- No Labels
- NRA Political Victory Fund
Paul Clements (D)

Labor unions

- AFL-CIO

Organizations

- Sierra Club

==== Polling ====
Poll source	Date(s) administered	Sample size	Margin of error	Fred Upton (R)	Paul Clements (D)	Undecided
Hamilton Campaigns (D-Clements)	October 24–26, 2014	400	± 4.9%	47%	43%	10%
Hamilton Campaigns (D-Clements)	October 2–5, 2014	–	–	50%	35%	15%
Hamilton Campaigns (D-Clements)	August 25–28, 2014	–	–	57%	37%	6%

==== Predictions ====
Source	Ranking	As of
The Cook Political Report	Likely R	November 3, 2014
Rothenberg	Likely R	October 24, 2014
Sabato's Crystal Ball	Safe R	October 30, 2014
RCP	Safe R	November 2, 2014
Daily Kos Elections	Safe R	November 4, 2014

==== Results ====
Michigan's 6th congressional district, 2014
Party	Candidate	Votes	%
Republican	Fred Upton (incumbent)	116,801	55.9
Democratic	Paul Clements	84,391	40.4
Libertarian	Erwin Haas	5,530	2.6
Green	John Lawrence	2,254	1.1
Total votes		208,976	100.0
Republican hold			

== District 7 ==
2014 Michigan's 7th congressional district election
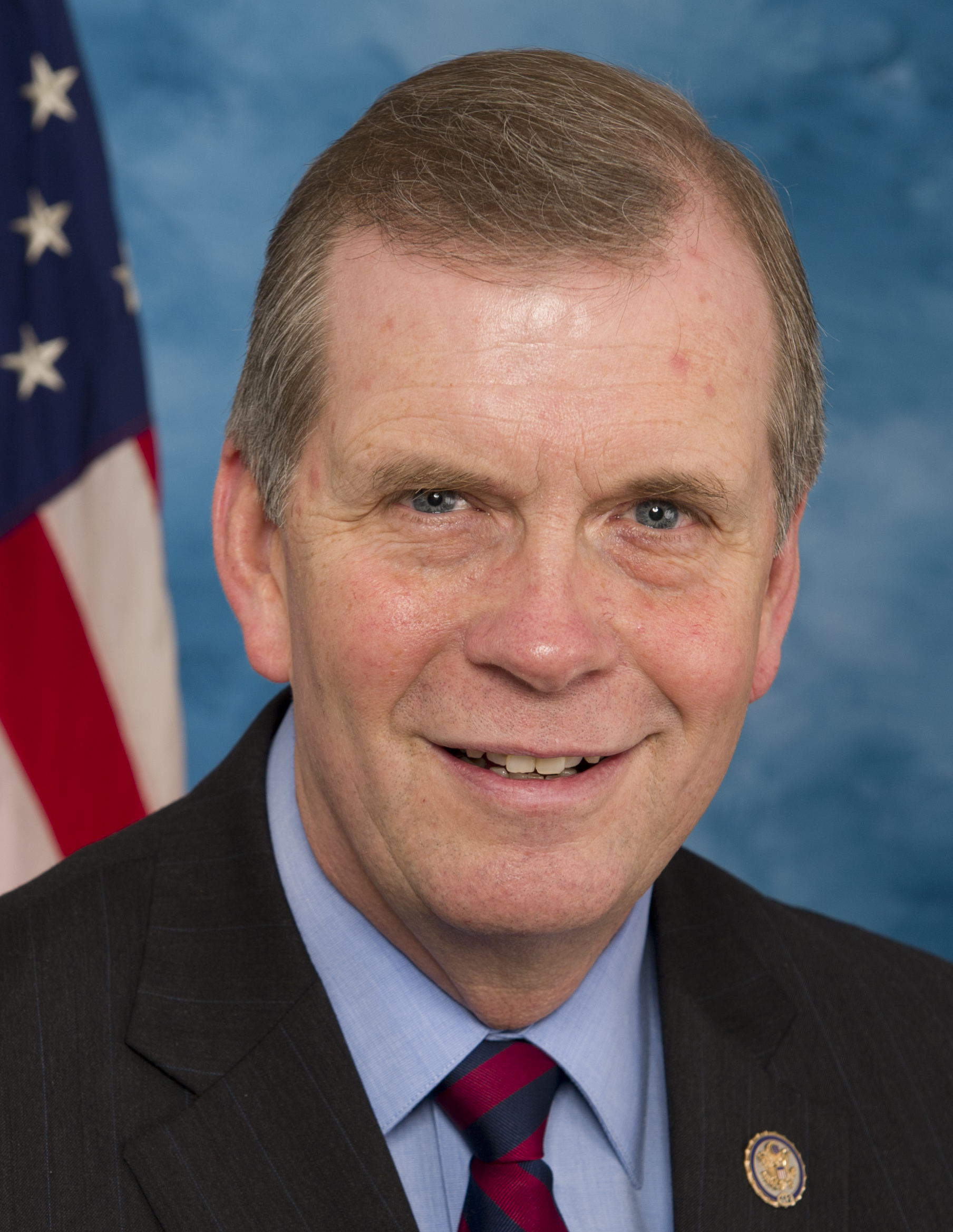

Nominee	Tim Walberg	Pam Byrnes
Party	Republican	Democratic
Popular vote	119,564	92,083
Percentage	53.4%	41.2%
- Walberg: 40–50% 50–60% 60–70% 70–80% 80–90% Byrnes: 40–50% 50–60% 60–70% 70–80% 80–90% Tie: 40–50% No votes
U.S. Representative before election
Tim Walberg
Republican
Elected U.S. Representative
Tim Walberg
Republican

The 7th district is located in Southern Michigan. The incumbent was Republican Tim Walberg, who had represented the district since 2011 and previously represented the district from 2007 to 2009. He was re-elected with 53% of the vote in 2012 and the district has a PVI of R+3.

As of September 30, 2013, Walberg had raised $482,372.42, and had $570,160.47 cash on-hand available for a presumed re-election bid.

Attorney and former state representative Pam Byrnes was recruited by Michigan Democratic Party chairman Lon Johnson to challenge Walberg. The Rothenberg Political Report rated this race as "Republican Favored." Walberg won the Republican nomination.

=== Republican primary ===
==== Candidates ====
===== Nominee =====
- Tim Walberg, incumbent U.S. Representative

===== Eliminated in primary =====
- Douglas Radcliffe North

==== Results ====
Republican primary results
Party	Candidate	Votes	%
Republican	Tim Walberg (incumbent)	38,046	79.3
Republican	Douglas North	9,934	20.7
Total votes		47,980	100.0

=== Democratic primary ===
==== Candidates ====
===== Nominee =====
- Pam Byrnes, former state representative

==== Results ====
Democratic primary results
Party	Candidate	Votes	%
Democratic	Pam Byrnes	25,048	100.0

=== General election ===
==== Endorsements ====
Tim Walberg (R)

Organizations

- National Right to Life Committee
- NRA Political Victory Fund
Pam Byrnes (D)

Labor unions

- AFL-CIO
- National Association of Letter Carriers

Organizations

- EMILY's List
- Equality Michigan
- Human Rights Campaign
- National Organization for Women
- Sierra Club

Newspapers

- Detroit Free Press

==== Polling ====
Poll source	Date(s) administered	Sample size	Margin of error	Tim Walberg (R)	Pam Byrnes (D)	Undecided
DCCC (D)	October 5, 2013	448	± 4.6%	43%	42%	15%

==== Predictions ====
Source	Ranking	As of
The Cook Political Report	Safe R	November 3, 2014
Rothenberg	Likely R	October 24, 2014
Sabato's Crystal Ball	Safe R	October 30, 2014
RCP	Likely R	November 2, 2014
Daily Kos Elections	Likely R	November 4, 2014

==== Results ====
Michigan's 7th congressional district, 2014
Party	Candidate	Votes	%
Republican	Tim Walberg (incumbent)	119,564	53.4
Democratic	Pam Byrnes	92,083	41.2
Libertarian	Ken Proctor	4,531	2.0
Independent	David Swartout	4,369	2.0
U.S. Taxpayers'	Rick Strawcutter	3,138	1.4
Total votes		223,685	100.0
Republican hold			

== District 8 ==
2014 Michigan's 8th congressional district election
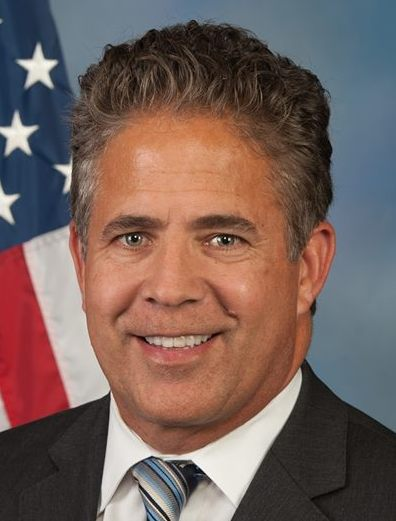

Nominee	Mike Bishop	Eric Schertzing
Party	Republican	Democratic
Popular vote	132,739	102,269
Percentage	54.6%	42.1%
- Bishop: 40–50% 50–60% 60–70% 70–80% >90% Schertzing: 40–50% 50–60% 60–70% 70–80% 80–90% No votes
U.S. Representative before election
Mike Rogers
Republican
Elected U.S. Representative
Mike Bishop
Republican

The 8th district is located in Southern and Southeast Michigan. The incumbent was Republican Mike Rogers, who had represented the district since 2001. He was re-elected with 59% of the vote in 2012 and the district has a PVI of R+2.

As of September 30, 2013, Rogers had raised $869,321.02, and had $1,819,857.21 cash on-hand available for a presumed re-election bid. Rogers had considering running for the U.S. Senate, but ultimately declined, before deciding not to seek re-election.

Rogers' retirement made the formerly "Safe Republican" district more competitive. The Rothenberg Political Report then rated this race "Republican Favored" and The Washington Post predicted a "scramble" in the race to win the seat. Mike Bishop won the Republican nomination and Eric Schertzing won the Democratic nomination to fill Camp's seat.

=== Republican primary ===
==== Candidates ====
===== Nominee =====
- Mike Bishop, former Majority Leader of the Michigan Senate and nominee for Prosecutor of Oakland County in 2012

===== Eliminated in primary =====
- Tom McMillin, state representative

===== Withdrawn =====
- Bryan Barnett, Mayor of Rochester Hills

===== Declined =====
- Saul Anuzis, former chairman of the Michigan Republican Party and candidate for chairman of the Republican National Committee in 2009 and 2011
- Mike Bouchard, Oakland County Sheriff, former state senator, nominee for the U.S. Senate in 2006 and candidate for Governor in 2010
- Cindy Denby, state representative
- Craig DeRoche, former Speaker of the Michigan House of Representatives
- Gail Haines, state representative
- Joe Hune, state senator
- Rick Jones, state senator and former Eaton County Sheriff
- Jim Marleau, state senator
- Bill Rogers, state representative and older brother of Mike Rogers
- Mike Rogers, incumbent U.S. Representative

==== Endorsements ====
Tom McMillin

Organizations

- Republican Liberty Caucus

==== Polling ====
Poll source	Date(s) administered	Sample size	Margin of error	Mike Bishop	Tom McMillin	Undecided
EPIC-MRA	July 19–20, 2014	800	± 35%	45%	33%	22%

Hypothetical polling

Poll source	Date(s) administered	Sample size	Margin of error	Saul Anuzis	Bryan Barnett	Mike Bishop	Steve Hantler	Joe Hune	Other	Undecided
Combat/Murray/Portable	March 31, 2014	884	± 3.29%	3.51%	5.66%	22.96%	1.58%	17.65%	—	48.64%

==== Results ====
Republican primary results
Party	Candidate	Votes	%
Republican	Mike Bishop	35,422	60.3
Republican	Tom McMillin	23,358	39.7
Total votes		58,780	100.0

=== Democratic primary ===
==== Candidates ====
===== Nominee =====
- Eric Schertzing, Ingham County Treasurer

===== Eliminated in primary =====
- Ken Darga, former state demographer
- Susan Grettenberger, associate professor and director of social work at Central Michigan University
- Jeffrey Hank, attorney

===== Declined =====
- Bob Alexander, activist and nominee for this seat in 2004 and 2008
- Virgil Bernero, Mayor of Lansing and nominee for Governor of Michigan in 2010
- Barb Byrum, Ingham County Clerk and former state representative
- Dianne Byrum, member of the Michigan State University board of trustees, former state representative, former state senator and nominee for the seat in 2000
- Mark Meadows, former state representative and former mayor of East Lansing
- Sam Singh, state representative and former mayor of East Lansing
- Peter Spadafore, President of the Lansing Board of Education
- Gretchen Whitmer, Minority Leader of the Michigan Senate

==== Results ====
Democratic primary results
Party	Candidate	Votes	%
Democratic	Eric Schertzing	13,535	42.8
Democratic	Susan Grettenberger	11,921	37.7
Democratic	Ken Darga	3,103	9.8
Democratic	Jeffrey Hank	3,054	9.7
Total votes		31,613	100.0

=== General election ===
==== Endorsements ====
Mike Bishop (R)

Organizations

- National Republican Congressional Committee "Young Guns" Program
- National Right to Life Committee
- NRA Political Victory Fund
Eric Schertzing (D)

Labor unions

- AFL-CIO

Organizations

- National Organization for Women
- Sierra Club

==== Polling ====
Poll source	Date(s) administered	Sample size	Margin of error	Mike Bishop (R)	Eric Schertzing (D)	Jim Casha (G)	James Weeks (L)	Undecided
GBA Strategies (D-Schertzing)	August 18–21, 2013	400	± 4.9%	42%	37%	3%	10%	8%

==== Predictions ====
Source	Ranking	As of
The Cook Political Report	Safe R	November 3, 2014
Rothenberg	Likely R	October 24, 2014
Sabato's Crystal Ball	Safe R	October 30, 2014
RCP	Likely R	November 2, 2014
Daily Kos Elections	Likely R	November 4, 2014

==== Results ====
Michigan's 8th congressional district, 2014
Party	Candidate	Votes	%
Republican	Mike Bishop	132,739	54.6
Democratic	Eric Schertzing	102,269	42.1
Libertarian	James Weeks	4,557	1.9
Green	Jim Casha	1,880	0.8
Natural Law	Jeremy Burgess	1,680	0.7
Total votes		243,125	100.0
Republican hold			

== District 9 ==
2014 Michigan's 9th congressional district election
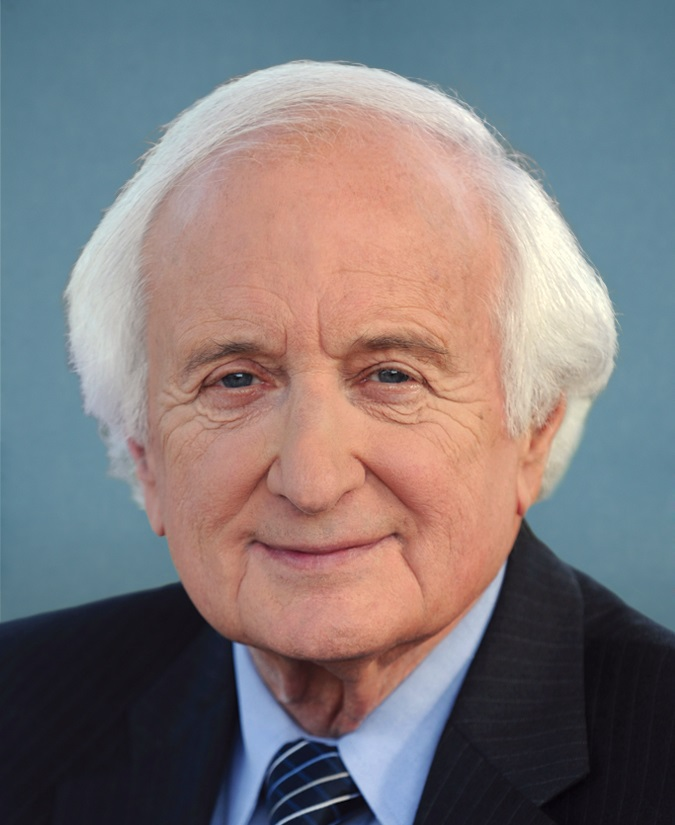

Nominee	Sander Levin	George Brikho
Party	Democratic	Republican
Popular vote	136,342	81,470
Percentage	60.4%	36.1%
- Levin: 40–50% 50–60% 60–70% 70–80% 80–90% >90% Brikho: 40–50% 50–60% 60–70% Tie: 40–50% No votes
U.S. Representative before election
Sander Levin
Democratic
Elected U.S. Representative
Sander Levin
Democratic

The 9th district is located in Southeast Michigan. The incumbent was Democrat Sander Levin, who had represented the district since 2013 and previously represented the 12th district from 1993 to 2013 and the 17th district from 1983 to 1993. He was re-elected with 62% of the vote in 2012 and the district has a PVI of D+6.

As of September 30, 2013, Levin had raised $620,167.36, and had $347,066.37 cash on-hand available for a presumed re-election bid.

=== Democratic primary ===
==== Candidates ====
===== Nominee =====
- Sander Levin, incumbent U.S. Representative

==== Results ====
Democratic primary results
Party	Candidate	Votes	%
Democratic	Sander Levin (incumbent)	40,877	100.0

=== Republican primary ===
==== Candidates ====
===== Nominee =====
- George Brikho

===== Withdrawn =====
- Greg Dildilian (running for the state house)

==== Results ====
Republican primary results
Party	Candidate	Votes	%
Republican	George Brikho	30,678	100.0

=== General election ===
==== Campaign ====
Republican candidate George Brikho caused controversy during the campaign, by suggesting Adolf Hitler was a better leader than Hillary Clinton.

==== Endorsements ====
Sander Levin (D)

Labor unions

- AFL-CIO
- National Association of Letter Carriers

Organizations

- Equality Michigan
- Human Rights Campaign
- Sierra Club

==== Predictions ====
Source	Ranking	As of
The Cook Political Report	Safe D	November 3, 2014
Rothenberg	Safe D	October 24, 2014
Sabato's Crystal Ball	Safe D	October 30, 2014
RCP	Safe D	November 2, 2014
Daily Kos Elections	Safe D	November 4, 2014

==== Results ====
Michigan's 9th congressional district, 2014
Party	Candidate	Votes	%
Democratic	Sander Levin (incumbent)	136,342	60.4
Republican	George Brikho	81,470	36.1
Libertarian	Gregory Creswell	4,792	2.1
Green	John McDermott	3,153	1.4
Total votes		225,757	100.0
Democratic hold			

== District 10 ==
2014 Michigan's 10th congressional district election
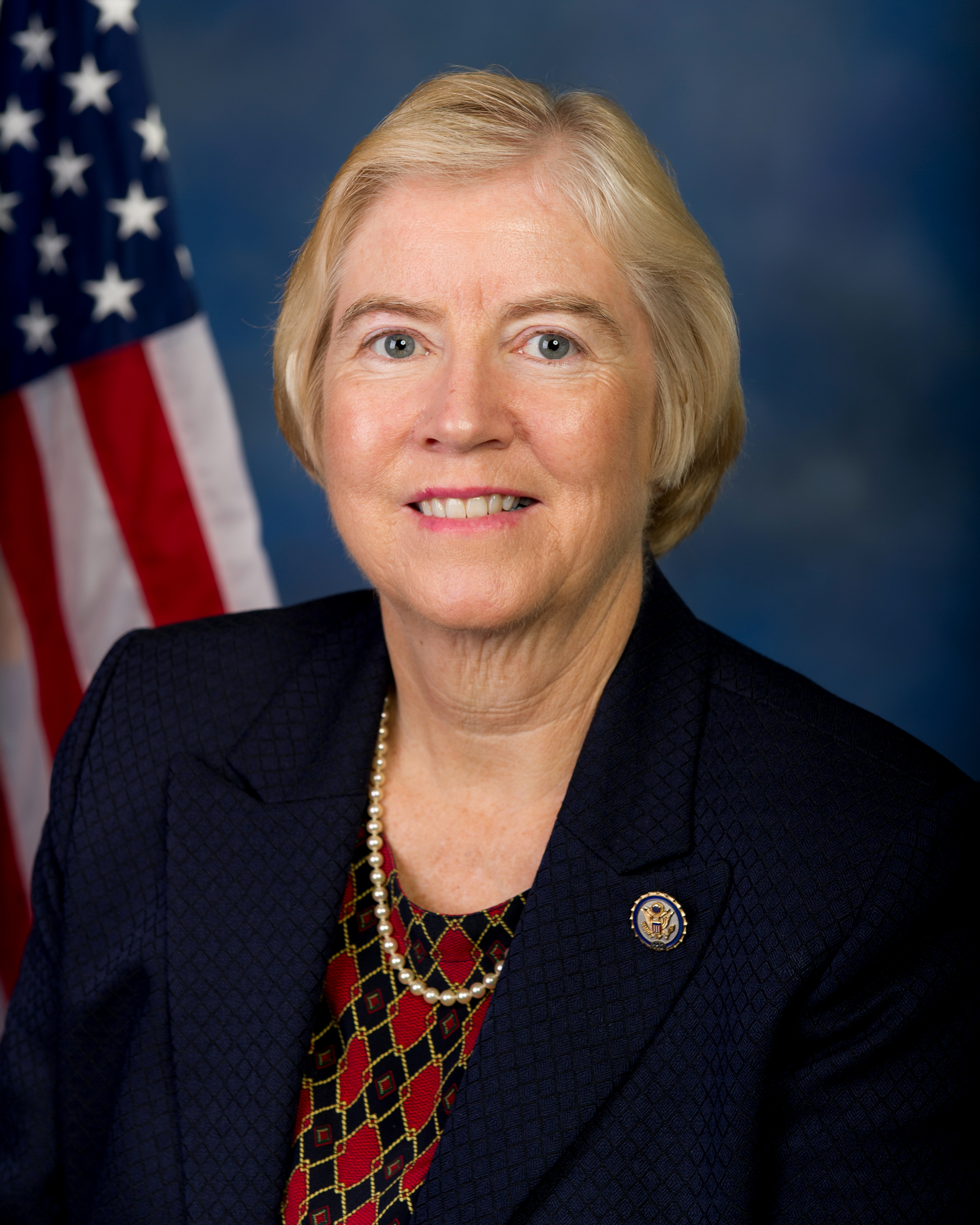

Nominee	Candice Miller	Chuck Stadler
Party	Republican	Democratic
Popular vote	157,069	110,112
Percentage	68.7%	29.3%
- Miller: 40–50% 50–60% 60–70% 70–80% 80–90% >90% Stadler: 40–50% 50–60% Tie: 40–50% No votes
U.S. Representative before election
Candice Miller
Republican
Elected U.S. Representative
Candice Miller
Republican

The 10th district is located an area of the Lower Peninsula of Michigan known as The Thumb. The incumbent wasis Republican Candice Miller, who had represented the district since 2003. She was re-elected with 69% of the vote in 2012 and the district has a PVI of R+6.

As of September 30, 2013, Miller had raised $395,759.26, and had $995,281.27 cash on-hand available for a presumed re-election bid. Miller declined an opportunity to run for the U.S. Senate seat being vacated by Carl Levin, declaring her intention to seek re-election instead.

=== Republican primary ===
==== Candidates ====
===== Nominee =====
- Candice Miller, incumbent U.S. Representative

==== Failed to qualify ====
- Don Volaric

==== Results ====
Republican primary results
Party	Candidate	Votes	%
Republican	Candice Miller (incumbent)	55,272	100.0

=== Democratic primary ===
==== Candidates ====
===== Nominee =====
- Chuck Stadler, accountant and nominee for this seat in 2012

==== Results ====
Democratic primary results
Party	Candidate	Votes	%
Democratic	Chuck Stadler	25,820	100.0

=== General election ===
Candice Miller (R)

Organizations

- National Right to Life Committee
- NRA Political Victory Fund

==== Predictions ====
Source	Ranking	As of
The Cook Political Report	Safe R	November 3, 2014
Rothenberg	Safe R	October 24, 2014
Sabato's Crystal Ball	Safe R	October 30, 2014
RCP	Safe R	November 2, 2014
Daily Kos Elections	Safe R	November 4, 2014

==== Results ====
Michigan's 10th congressional district, 2014
Party	Candidate	Votes	%
Republican	Candice Miller (incumbent)	157,069	68.7
Democratic	Chuck Stadler	67,143	29.3
Green	Harley Mikkelson	4,480	2.0
Total votes		228,692	100.0
Republican hold			

== District 11 ==
2014 Michigan's 11th congressional district election
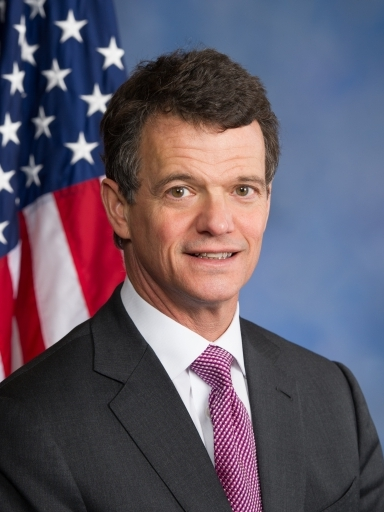

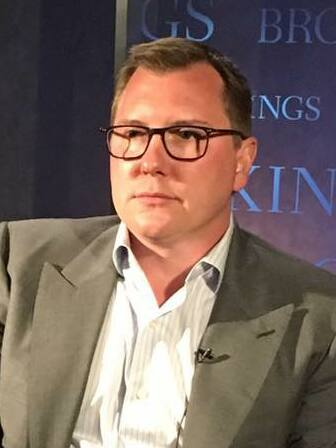
Nominee	Dave Trott	Robert L. McKenzie
Party	Republican	Democratic
Popular vote	140,435	101,681
Percentage	55.9%	40.5%
- Trott: 40–50% 50–60% 60–70% 70–80% 80–90% McKenzie: 40–50% 50–60% 60–70% 70–80% No votes
U.S. Representative before election
Kerry Bentivolio
Republican
Elected U.S. Representative
Dave Trott
Republican

The 11th district is located northwest of Detroit. The incumbent was Republican Kerry Bentivolio, who had represented the district since 2013. He was elected in 2012, winning the general election with 51% of the vote but losing the special election to fill the final few weeks of Republican Thaddeus McCotter's term. The district has a PVI of R+4.

The Rothenberg Political Report rated this race "Republican Favored."

=== Republican primary ===
As of September 30, 2013, Bentivolio had raised $165,479.93, and had $38,677.61 cash on-hand available for a presumed re-election bid. Foreclosure attorney David Trott, a major campaign donor for Mitt Romney's 2012 presidential campaign and a close friend to Oakland County Executive L. Brooks Patterson, challenged Bentivolio in the Republican primary. As of September 30, 2013, Trott had raised $647,719.32, and had $452,421.31 cash on-hand available for his primary challenge. First quarter, 2014 Federal Election Commission filings showed that Trott self-funded his campaign with over $800,000 while acquiring approximately $850,000 from donors. FEC filings by Rep. Kerry Bentivolio indicated he had raised approximately $440,000 from donors.

==== Candidates ====
===== Nominee =====
- David Trott, foreclosure attorney

===== Eliminated in primary =====
- Kerry Bentivolio, incumbent U.S. Representative

==== Endorsements ====
Kerry Bentivolio

Organizations

- Republican Liberty Caucus

==== Polling ====
Poll source	Date(s) administered	Sample size	Margin of error	Kerry Bentivolio	David Trott	Undecided
EPIC-MRA	July 12–13, 2014	802	± 3.5%	31%	53%	16%
National Research Inc. (R-Trott)	June 23–24, 2014	400	± 4.9%	21%	39%	40%
MIRS	May 2014	–	–	33%	21%	46%
Murray Communications	September 10, 2013	717	± 3.66%	60%	40%	—

==== Results ====
2014 Republican primary results by county Trott 60–70%

Republican primary results
Party	Candidate	Votes	%
Republican	Dave Trott	42,008	66.4
Republican	Kerry Bentivolio (incumbent)	21,254	33.6
Total votes		63,262	100.0

After his defeat, Bentivolio announced that he was running a write-in campaign. He alleged that after Trott won the primary, the Trott campaign "kept up the attacks, but they expanded it beyond me. After they won the race, they continued to beat up me, my family members, as well as my staff... I put them on notice: If they didn't stop I'm probably going to end up doing a write-in campaign. And they didn't stop." The Trott campaign has denied this, saying that "nothing like that occurred." Bentivolio does not think he will win, or even "get enough votes to keep [Trott] from getting elected... all I'm concerned about is getting people who want a voice through a protest vote to do a protest vote."

=== Democratic primary ===
Robert L. McKenzie, who had worked for the United States Department of State as senior advisor, was the Democratic Party nominee. Jocelyn Benson, the Dean of Wayne State University Law School, was considering running for the seat but declined to do so in the wake of the murder of a student at Wayne State University. Michigan Democratic Party Chairman Lon Johnson said the party would field a top caliber opponent against the Republican nominee.

McKenzie would win the Democratic nomination.

==== Candidates ====
===== Nominee =====
- Bobby McKenzie, counter-terrorism specialist

===== Eliminated in primary =====
- Anil Kumar, physician
- Bill Roberts
- Nancy Skinner, radio host, candidate for the U.S. Senate from Illinois in 2004 and nominee for Michigan's 9th congressional district in 2006

===== Declined =====
- Jocelyn Benson, Dean of Wayne State University Law School and nominee for Michigan Secretary of State in 2010

==== Polling ====
Poll source	Date(s) administered	Sample size	Margin of error	Anil Kumar	Bobby McKenzie	Bill Roberts	Nancy Skinner	Undecided
Target-Insyght	June 17–19, 2014	400	± 5%	21%	7%	5%	14%	54%

==== Results ====
Democratic primary results
Party	Candidate	Votes	%
Democratic	Bobby McKenzie	13,441	34.3
Democratic	Anil Kumar	12,479	31.8
Democratic	Nancy Skinner	10,371	26.5
Democratic	Bill Roberts	2,906	7.4
Total votes		39,197	100.0

=== General election ===
==== Endorsements ====
Dave Trott (R)

Organizations

- National Right to Life Committee
- NRA Political Victory Fund
Bobby McKenzie (D)

Labor unions

- AFL-CIO
- National Association of Letter Carriers

Organizations

- Equality Michigan
- National Organization for Women
- Sierra Club

Newspapers

- Detroit Free Press

==== Polling ====
Poll source	Date(s) administered	Sample size	Margin of error	David Trott (R)	Bobby McKenzie (D)	James Tatar (L)	Kerry Bentivolio (WI)	Undecided
Mitchell Research	October 15, 2014	472	± 4.51%	47%	35%	2%	7%	10%
Tulchin Research (D-McKenzie)	August 20–24, 2013	500	± 4.38%	44%	40%	—	—	16%

==== Predictions ====
Source	Ranking	As of
The Cook Political Report	Likely R	November 3, 2014
Rothenberg	Likely R	October 24, 2014
Sabato's Crystal Ball	Safe R	October 30, 2014
RCP	Safe R	November 2, 2014
Daily Kos Elections	Safe R	November 4, 2014

==== Results ====
Michigan's 11th congressional district, 2014
Party	Candidate	Votes	%
Republican	Dave Trott	140,435	55.9
Democratic	Bobby McKenzie	101,681	40.5
Libertarian	John Tatar	7,711	3.0
Republican	Kerry Bentivolio (incumbent) (write-in)	1,411	0.6
Total votes		251,238	100.0
Republican hold			

== District 12 ==
2014 Michigan's 12th congressional district election
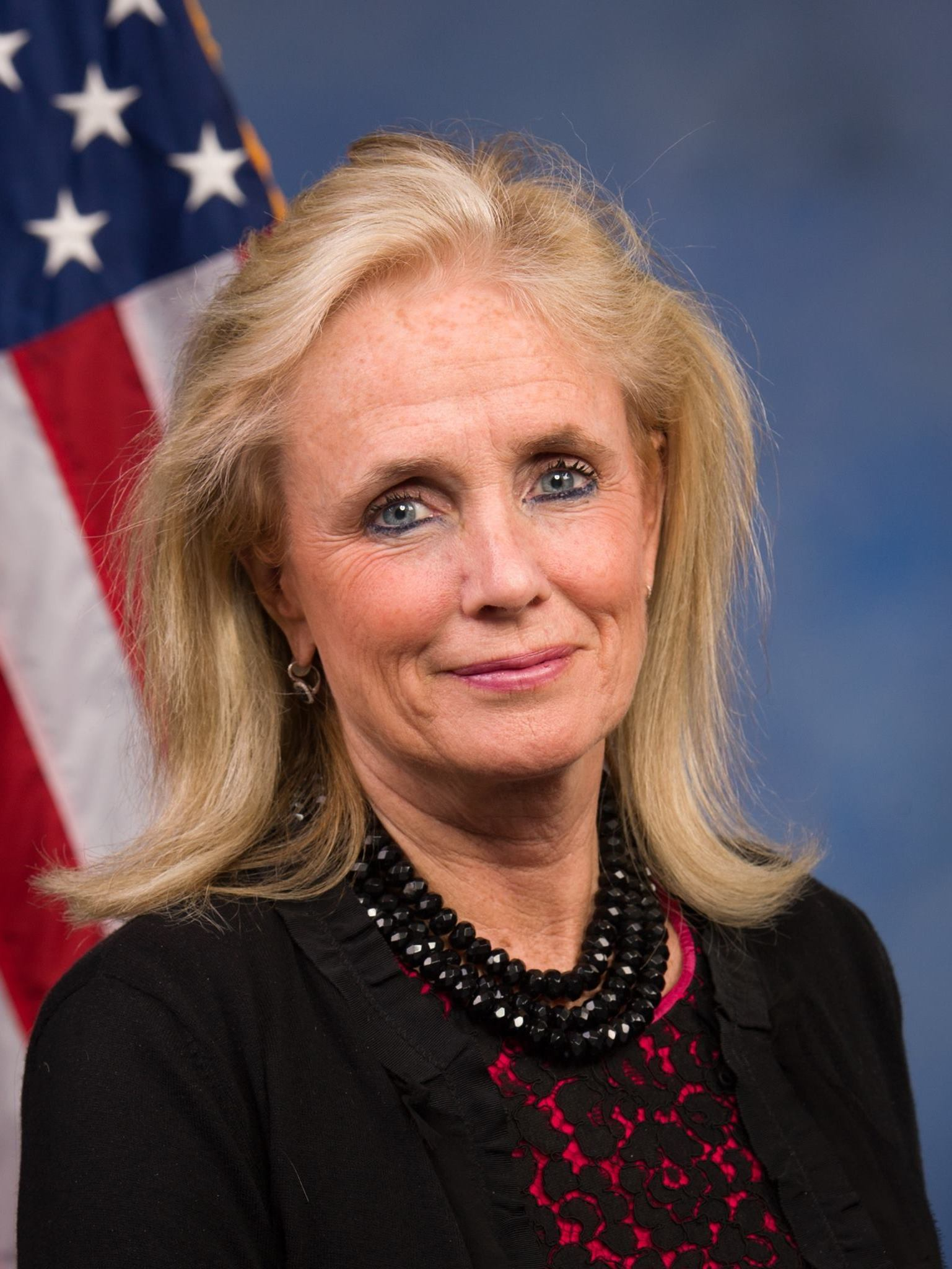

Nominee	Debbie Dingell	Terry Bowman
Party	Democratic	Republican
Popular vote	134,346	64,716
Percentage	65.0%	31.3%
- Dingell: 40–50% 50–60% 60–70% 70–80% 80–90% >90% Bowman: 40–50% 50–60% 60–70% Tie: 50% No votes
U.S. Representative before election
John Dingell
Democratic
Elected U.S. Representative
Debbie Dingell
Democratic

The 12th district is located between Detroit's western suburbs and Ann Arbor. The incumbent was Democrat John Dingell, who had represented the district since 2013 and previously represented the 15th district from 2003 to 2013, the 16th district from 1965 to 2003 and the 15th district from 1955 to 1965. He was re-elected with 68% of the vote in 2012 and the district had a PVI of D+15.

As of September 30, 2013, he had raised $299,148.00 and had $337,402.23 cash on-hand, but eventually chose to not seek re-election. His wife, Deborah Dingell, ran for the seat instead. She defeated Raymond Mullins for the Democratic nomination, and went on to defeat Terry Bowman in the general election. Upon her election she became the first person in history to succeed a living spouse in Congress.

=== Democratic primary ===
==== Candidates ====
===== Nominee =====
- Deborah Dingell, Member of the Wayne State University Board of Governors

===== Eliminated in primary =====
- Raymond Mullins

===== Declined =====
- John Dingell, incumbent U.S. Representative
- Lynn N. Rivers, former U.S. Representative
- Rebekah Warren, state senator

==== Polling ====
Poll source	Date(s) administered	Sample size	Margin of error	Deborah Dingell	Doug Geiss	Hoon-Young Hopgood	Jeff Irwin	Rebekah Warren	Undecided
Revsix/Mainstreet Strategies	February 26–27, 2013	813	± 3.4%	51%	2%	4%	3%	16%	23%
Revsix/Mainstreet Strategies	February 26–27, 2013	813	± 3.4%	56%	—	—	—	22%	22%

==== Results ====
Democratic primary results
Party	Candidate	Votes	%
Democratic	Deborah Dingell	45,162	77.7
Democratic	Raymond Mullins	12,994	22.3
Total votes		58,156	100.0

=== Republican primary ===
==== Candidates ====
===== Nominee =====
- Terry Bowman

===== Withdrawn =====
- Stephen Farkas

==== Results ====
Republican primary results
Party	Candidate	Votes	%
Republican	Terry Bowman	18,793	100.0

=== General election ===
==== Endorsements ====
Deborah Dingell (D)

Labor unions

- AFL-CIO
- National Association of Letter Carriers

Organizations

- EMILY's List
- Equality Michigan
- National Organization for Women

==== Predictions ====
Source	Ranking	As of
The Cook Political Report	Safe D	November 3, 2014
Rothenberg	Safe D	October 24, 2014
Sabato's Crystal Ball	Safe D	October 30, 2014
RCP	Safe D	November 2, 2014
Daily Kos Elections	Safe D	November 4, 2014

==== Results ====
Michigan's 12th congressional district, 2014
Party	Candidate	Votes	%
Democratic	Deborah Dingell	134,346	65.0
Republican	Terry Bowman	64,716	31.3
Independent	Gary Walkowicz	5,039	2.4
Libertarian	Bhagwan Dashairya	2,559	1.3
Total votes		206,660	100.0
Democratic hold			

== District 13 ==
2014 Michigan's 13th congressional district election
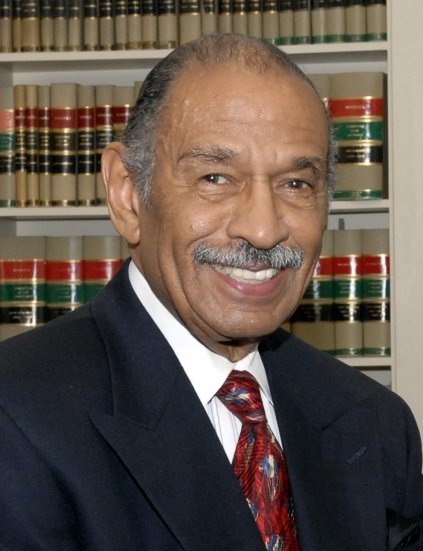

Nominee	John Conyers	Jeff Gorman
Party	Democratic	Republican
Popular vote	132,710	27,234
Percentage	79.5%	16.3%
- Precinct results Conyers: 40–50% 50–60% 60–70% 70–80% 80–90% >90% Gorman: 40–50% 50–60% No votes
U.S. Representative before election
John Conyers
Democratic
Elected U.S. Representative
John Conyers
Democratic

The 13th district is located in Wayne County and includes much of the city of Detroit. The incumbent was Democrat John Conyers, who had represented the district since 2013 and previously represented the 14th district from 1993 to 2013 and the 1st district from 1965 to 1993. He was re-elected with 83% of the vote in 2012 and the district has a PVI of D+34.

As of September 30, 2013, Conyers had raised $266,996.51, and had $132,515.29 cash on-hand available for a presumed re-election bid.

=== Democratic primary ===
The Wayne County Clerk determined that Conyers did not supply enough valid signatures to make the primary ballot. Conyers could have either appealed or ran as a write-in candidate. While the Michigan Secretary of State confirmed the ruling, a federal judge ordered Conyers' name back on the ballot. Conyers defeated Horace Sheffield III for the Democratic nomination.

==== Candidates ====
===== Nominee =====
- John Conyers, incumbent U.S. Representative

===== Eliminated in primary =====
- Horace Sheffield III, pastor of the New Destiny Christian Fellowship Church

==== Results ====
Democratic primary results
Party	Candidate	Votes	%
Democratic	John Conyers (incumbent)	42,005	73.9
Democratic	Horace Sheffield III	14,850	26.1
Total votes		56,855	100.0

=== Republican primary ===
==== Candidates ====
===== Nominee =====
- Jeff Gorman, retired Naval Officer and commercial airline pilot

==== Results ====
Republican primary results
Party	Candidate	Votes	%
Republican	Jeff Gorman	6,696	100.0

=== General election ===
==== Endorsements ====
John Conyers (D)

Labor unions

- AFL-CIO
- National Association of Letter Carriers

Organizations

- Equality Michigan
- Everytown for Gun Safety
- Human Rights Campaign
- National Organization for Women
- Sierra Club

==== Predictions ====
Source	Ranking	As of
The Cook Political Report	Safe D	November 3, 2014
Rothenberg	Safe D	October 24, 2014
Sabato's Crystal Ball	Safe D	October 30, 2014
RCP	Safe D	November 2, 2014
Daily Kos Elections	Safe D	November 4, 2014

==== Results ====
Michigan's 13th congressional district, 2014
Party	Candidate	Votes	%
Democratic	John Conyers (incumbent)	132,710	79.5
Republican	Jeff Gorman	27,234	16.3
Libertarian	Chis Sharer	3,537	2.1
Independent	Sam Johnson	3,466	2.1
Total votes		166,947	100.0
Democratic hold			

== District 14 ==
2014 Michigan's 14th congressional district election
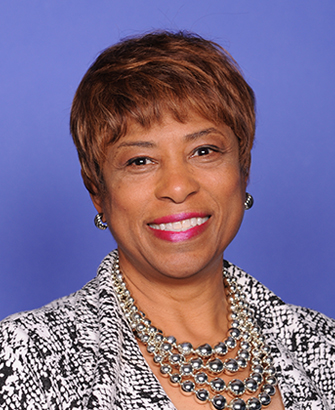

Nominee	Brenda Lawrence	Christina Barr
Party	Democratic	Republican
Popular vote	165,272	41,801
Percentage	77.8%	19.7%
- Lawrence: 40–50% 50–60% 60–70% 70–80% 80–90% >90% Barr: 40–50% 50–60% 60–70% 70–80% 80–90% No votes
U.S. Representative before election
Gary Peters
Democratic
Elected U.S. Representative
Brenda Lawrence
Democratic

The 14th district stretches from eastern Detroit westward to Farmington Hills, then north to the suburbs of Auburn Hills. The incumbent was Democrat Gary Peters, who had represented the district since 2013 and previously represented the 9th district from 2009 to 2013. He was re-elected with 82% of the vote in 2012 and the district has a PVI of D+29.

Peters did not run for re-election; he instead ran for the United States Senate seat being vacated by retiring Democrat Carl Levin in 2014.

Brenda Lawrence won the Democratic primary on August 5, 2014.

Christina Conyers was the only filed Republican candidate for the GOP primary.

=== Democratic primary ===
==== Candidates ====
===== Nominee =====
- Brenda Lawrence, Mayor of Southfield, nominee for Oakland County Executive in 2008, for lieutenant governor in 2010 and candidate for this seat in 2012

===== Eliminated in primary =====
- Hansen Clarke, former U.S. Representative
- Burgess Foster
- Rudy Hobbs, state representative

===== Withdrawn =====
- Godfrey Dillard, attorney (running for Secretary of State)
- Stephen Dunwoody
- MyKale L. "Kelly" Garrett, Lathrup Village City Councilwoman (running for state representative)
- Vincent Gregory, state senator (running for re-election)
- Bert Johnson, state senator (running for re-election)
- Jessica Lynn McCall, former staffer for Jennifer Granholm and former Department of Health and Human Services employee
- Maurice Morton, attorney and businessman

===== Declined =====
- Gary Peters, incumbent U.S. Representative (running for the U.S. Senate)

==== Polling ====
Poll source	Date(s) administered	Sample size	Margin of error	Hansen Clarke	Burgess Foster	Rudy Hobbs	Brenda Lawrence	Undecided
Mitchell Research	July 28–29, 2014	–	–	25%	2%	38%	22%	13%
EPIC-MRA	July 12–13, 2014	802	± 3.5%	39%	4%	20%	28%	9%
Lake Research Partners (D-Lawrence)	June 3–5, 2014	400	± 4.9%	27%	0%	6%	35%	32%
Target Insyght	May 20–22, 2014	400	± 5%	32%	5%	8%	22%	33%

Poll source	Date(s) administered	Sample size	Margin of error	Godfrey Dillard	Vince Gregrory	Rudy Hobbs	Bert Johnson	Brenda Lawrence	LaMar Lemmons	Jessica McCall	Undecided
Lake Research Partners (D-Lawrence)	November 14–18, 2013	406	± 4.9%	0%	1%	6%	5%	37%	3%	0%	46%

==== Results ====
Democratic primary results
Party	Candidate	Votes	%
Democratic	Brenda Lawrence	26,387	35.6
Democratic	Rudy Hobbs	23,996	32.4
Democratic	Hansen Clarke	22,866	30.9
Democratic	Burgess Foster	831	1.1
Total votes		74,080	100.0

=== Republican primary ===
==== Candidates ====
===== Nominee =====
- Christina Conyers (withdrew after primary win)

==== Results ====
Republican primary results
Party	Candidate	Votes	%
Republican	Christina Conyers	12,611	100.0

===== Replacement nominee =====
- Christina Barr

=== General election ===
==== Endorsements ====
Brenda Lawrence (D)

Labor unions

- AFL-CIO

Organizations

- EMILY's List
- Equality Michigan
- Everytown for Gun Safety

==== Predictions ====
Source	Ranking	As of
The Cook Political Report	Safe D	November 3, 2014
Rothenberg	Safe D	October 24, 2014
Sabato's Crystal Ball	Safe D	October 30, 2014
RCP	Safe D	November 2, 2014
Daily Kos Elections	Safe D	November 4, 2014

==== Results ====
Michigan's 14th congressional district, 2014
Party	Candidate	Votes	%
Democratic	Brenda Lawrence	165,272	77.8
Republican	Christina Barr	41,801	19.7
Libertarian	Leonard Schwartz	3,366	1.6
Green	Stephen Boyle	1,999	0.9
Independent	Calvin Pruden (write-in)	30	0.0
Total votes		212,468	100.0
Democratic hold			

== See also ==
- 2014 United States House of Representatives elections
- 2014 United States elections
