= Senator Stamas =

Senator Stamas may refer to:

- Jim Stamas (born 1965), Michigan State Senate
- Tony Stamas (born 1966), Michigan State Senate
