= Eugene R. Cater =

American politician (1923–1990)

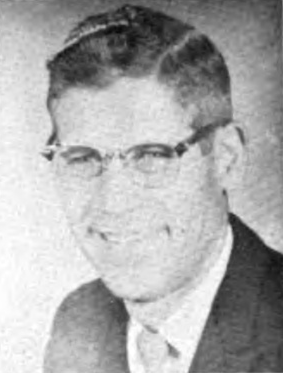

Member of the Michigan House of Representatives from the 98th district
- In office January 1, 1965 – January 1, 1967
- Preceded by: District established
- Succeeded by: Dennis O. Cawthorne

Personal details
- Born: December 8, 1923 St. Joseph, Missouri
- Died: January 15, 1990 (aged 66) Manatee Memorial Hospital, Bradenton, Florida
- Party: Democratic

Eugene Roy Cater (December 8, 1923 – January 15, 1990) was a Michigan politician.

== Early life and education ==
Cater was born on December 8, 1923, in St. Joseph, Missouri. Cater was of Danish ancestry. Cater was a graduate of Ludington High School.

== Military career ==
Cater served in the United States Army during World War II. Cater then served in the United States Coast Guard Auxiliary. Cater was a member of the National Order of the Trench Rats and the Disabled American Veterans.

== Career ==
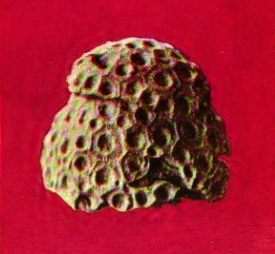
Petoskey stone as it appeared in the 1965 to 1966 edition of the Michigan Manual

Cater owned and operated a laundry in Ludington, Michigan. On November 4, 1964, Cater was elected to the Michigan House of Representatives, where he represented the 98th district from January 1, 1965, to January 1, 1967. In May 1965, Cater, along with Republican Stanley M. Powell, introduced House Bill 2297, which sought to make the Petoskey stone Michigan's state stone. The bill was passed by the state house on May 19, 1965. On June 28, 1965, the bill was signed by Michigan Governor George W. Romney during a ceremony which was attended by Cater and Powell. During the ceremony, Cater presented Governor Romney with a tie clasp and cufflink set made of Petoskey stones.

In 1975, Cater moved from Ludington to Palmetto, Florida.

== Personal life ==
In 1948, Cater married Donna Mae Fenner. Together, they had one child. Cater later married Leota, and had three stepchildren. Cater was a member of the Elks, the Fraternal Order of Eagles, and the American Legion. Cater was also a Freemason. Cater was Lutheran.

== Death ==
Cater died on January 15, 1990, in Manatee Memorial Hospital in Bradenton, Florida. He was interred at Lakeview Cemetery in Ludington, Michigan.
