= Annette Glenn =

American politician

Member of the Michigan House of Representatives from the 98th district
- In office January 2019 – January 2023
- Preceded by: Gary Glenn
- Succeeded by: Gregory Alexander

Personal details
- Born: Annette Williams; November 19, 1963 Boise, Idaho, U.S.
- Spouse: Gary Richard Glenn
- Children: 5
- Education: Boise State University

Annette Glenn (née Williams; born November 19, 1963) is an American politician from Michigan. Glenn was a Republican member of the Michigan House of Representatives from District 98 from 2019-2023.

== Early life ==
A native of Idaho, Annette Glenn earned a bachelor's degree in Public Administration from Boise State University in Boise, Idaho. While a student, Glenn was the chairperson of Boise State University College Republicans.

== Career ==
Glenn started her political career as a staff member for the United States House of Representatives and U.S. Senator Bob Dole's Presidential Campaign. At age 24, Glenn became the chairperson of Ada County (Boise) Republican Party.

In 2016, while Glenn's husband was receiving chemotherapy treatment, she attended meetings and sat in Michigan House sessions with him.

In August 2018, Glenn won the primary election for Michigan House of Representatives from District 98. On November 6, 2018, Glenn won the election and became a Republican member of the Michigan House of Representatives from District 98. Glenn defeated Sarah Schulz with 52.03% of the votes.

In November 2020, Glenn won reelection for Michigan House of Representatives from District 98. Glenn defeated Sarah Schultz with 58.68% of the votes.

In February 2021, Glenn announced her candidacy for Michigan Senate from the District 36. She lost the election in November 2022.

== Personal life ==
Glenn's husband is Gary Glenn, a politician. They have five children. Glenn and her family live in Midland, Michigan.

== See also ==
- 2018 Michigan House of Representatives election
