= Gregory Alexander (politician) =

American politician from Michigan

Member of the Michigan House of Representatives from the 98th district
- Incumbent
- Assumed office January 1, 2023
- Preceded by: Annette Glenn (redistricting)

Personal details
- Party: Republican

Gregory Alexander is an American politician from Michigan who has represented the 98th district in the Michigan House of Representatives since the 2022 election. He was reelected in 2024.

Alexander was drain commissioner of Sanilac County.

== See also ==
- Official website at the Michigan House of Representatives
