= Jeff Dongvillo =

American politician (born 1953)

Member of the Michigan House of Representatives from the 98th district
- In office January 1, 1979 – 1980
- Preceded by: Dennis O. Cawthorne
- Succeeded by: Edgar W. Giese

Personal details
- Born: 1953 (age 72–73) Fountain, Michigan
- Party: Democratic
- Education: Grand Valley State University

Jeff Dongvillo (born 1953) is a former member of the Michigan House of Representatives.

== Early life ==
Dongvillo was born in 1953 in Fountain, Michigan.

== Education ==
Dongvillo was earned a Bachelor of Science in political science from Grand Valley State University.

== Career ==
Dongvillo unsuccessfully ran in the 1974 Democratic primary for the Michigan Senate seat representing the 33rd district. On November 7, 1978, Dongvillo was elected to the Michigan House of Representatives where he represented the 98th district from January 10, 1979 to 1980. Dongvillo was not re-elected in 1980. In 1982, Dongvillo once again ran for the Michigan Senate seat representing the 33rd district, where he won the nomination, but lost the election.

== Personal life ==
Dongvillo is Catholic.
