= James R. McNutt =

American politician (1935–2024)

Member of the Michigan House of Representatives from the 98th district
- In office January 1, 1993 – 1998
- Preceded by: William Bobier
- Succeeded by: Tony Stamas

Member of the Michigan House of Representatives from the 102nd district
- In office January 1, 1991 – 1992
- Preceded by: Dave Camp
- Succeeded by: John Gernaat

Personal details
- Born: January 28, 1935
- Died: March 27, 2024 (aged 89)
- Party: Republican
- Spouse: Mary Jane
- Children: 3
- Education: Michigan State University

James R. McNutt (January 28, 1935 – March 27, 2024) was an American politician who served in the Michigan House of Representatives.

== Early life and education ==
McNutt was born on January 28, 1935. He earned a bachelor's degree and a master's degree from Michigan State University.

== Career ==
McNutt served as Midland County sheriff from 1977 to 1990. McNutt was sworn in as the member of the Michigan House of Representatives from the 102nd district on January 4, 1991, and served in this position until 1992. He then represented the 98th district from 1993 to 1998.

== Personal life and death ==
McNutt married Mary Jane. Together, they had three children. He was a Kiwanian. McNutt died on March 27, 2024, at the age of 89.
