= United States House Appropriations Subcommittee on Labor, Health and Human Services, Education, and Related Agencies =

Subcommittee of Committee on Appropriations
- Active United States House of Representatives; 119th Congress

Leadership
- Chair: Robert Aderholt (R)
- Ranking Member: Rosa DeLauro (D)

Structure
- Seats: 17 (17 currently filled) 10/10 7/7
- Political parties: Majority (10): Republican (10); Minority (7): Democratic (7)

Meeting place
- 2358B, Rayburn House Office Building; Washington, D.C. 20515

Phone number
- (202)-225-3508

The Subcommittee on Labor, Health and Human Services, Education, and Related Agencies is a subcommittee within the House Appropriations Committee. The United States House Committee on Appropriations has joint jurisdiction with the United States Senate Committee on Appropriations over all appropriations bills in the United States Congress. Each committee has 12 matching subcommittees, each of which is tasked with working on one of the twelve annual regular appropriations bills. This subcommittee has jurisdiction over the budget for the United States Department of Labor, the United States Department of Health and Human Services, and the United States Department of Education.

It is chaired by Republican Robert Aderholt, and its Ranking Member is Democrat Rosa DeLauro, who is also the Ranking Member of the full committee.

== Appropriations process ==
Traditionally, after a federal budget for the upcoming fiscal year has been passed, the appropriations subcommittees receive information about what the budget sets as their spending ceilings. This is called "302(b) allocations" after section 302(b) of the Congressional Budget Act of 1974. That amount is separated into smaller amounts for each of the twelve Subcommittees. The federal budget does not become law and is not signed by the President. Instead, it is a guide for the House and the Senate in making appropriations and tax decisions. However, no budget is required and each chamber has procedures in place for what to do without one. The House and Senate now consider appropriations bills simultaneously, although originally the House went first. The House Committee on Appropriations usually reports the appropriations bills in May and June and the Senate in June. Any differences between appropriations bills passed by the House and the Senate are resolved in the fall.

== Appropriations bills ==
An appropriations bill is a bill that appropriates (gives to, sets aside for) money to specific federal government departments, agencies, and programs. The money provides funding for operations, personnel, equipment, and activities. Regular appropriations bills are passed annually, with the funding they provide covering one fiscal year. The fiscal year is the accounting period of the federal government, which runs from October 1 to September 30 of the following year.

There are three types of appropriations bills: regular appropriations bills, continuing resolutions, and supplemental appropriations bills. Regular appropriations bills are the twelve standard bills that cover the funding for the federal government for one fiscal year and that are supposed to be enacted into law by October 1. If Congress has not enacted the regular appropriations bills by the time, it can pass a continuing resolution, which continues the pre-existing appropriations at the same levels as the previous fiscal year (or with minor modifications) for a set amount of time. The third type of appropriations bills are supplemental appropriations bills, which add additional funding above and beyond what was originally appropriated at the beginning of the fiscal year. Supplemental appropriations bills can be used for things like disaster relief.

Appropriations bills are one part of a larger United States budget and spending process. They are preceded in that process by the president's budget proposal, congressional budget resolutions, and the 302(b) allocation. Article One of the United States Constitution, section 9, clause 7, states that "No money shall be drawn from the Treasury, but in Consequence of Appropriations made by Law..." This is what gives Congress the power to make these appropriations. The President, however, still has the power to veto appropriations bills.

== Members, 119th Congress ==
| Majority | Minority |
|---|---|
| Robert Aderholt, Alabama, Chair; Mike Simpson, Idaho; Andy Harris, Maryland; Chuck Fleischmann, Tennessee; John Moolenaar, Michigan; Julia Letlow, Louisiana, Vice Chair; Andrew Clyde, Georgia; Jake Ellzey, Texas; Stephanie Bice, Oklahoma; Riley Moore, West Virginia | Rosa DeLauro, Connecticut, Ranking Member; Steny Hoyer, Maryland; Mark Pocan, Wisconsin; Lois Frankel, Florida; Bonnie Watson Coleman, New Jersey; Josh Harder, California; Madeleine Dean, Pennsylvania |
Ex officio
| Tom Cole, Oklahoma | |

== Historical membership rosters ==
=== 115th Congress ===
| Majority | Minority |
|---|---|
| Tom Cole, Oklahoma, Chair; Mike Simpson, Idaho; Steve Womack, Arkansas, Vice Chair; Chuck Fleischmann, Tennessee; Andy Harris, Maryland; Martha Roby, Alabama; Jaime Herrera Beutler, Washington; John Moolenaar, Michigan | Rosa DeLauro, Connecticut, Ranking Member; Lucille Roybal-Allard, California; Barbara Lee, California; Mark Pocan, Wisconsin; Katherine Clark, Massachusetts |
Ex officio
| Rodney Frelinghuysen, New Jersey | Nita Lowey, New York |

=== 116th Congress ===
| Majority | Minority |
|---|---|
| Rosa DeLauro, Connecticut, Chair; Lucille Roybal-Allard, California, Vice Chair; Barbara Lee, California; Mark Pocan, Wisconsin; Katherine Clark, Massachusetts; Lois Frankel, Florida; Cheri Bustos, Illinois; Bonnie Watson Coleman, New Jersey | Tom Cole, Oklahoma, Ranking Member; Andy Harris, Maryland; Jaime Herrera Beutler, Washington; John Moolenaar, Michigan; Tom Graves, Georgia |
Ex officio
| Nita Lowey, New York | Kay Granger, Texas |

=== 117th Congress ===
| Majority | Minority |
|---|---|
| Rosa DeLauro, Connecticut, Chair; Lucille Roybal-Allard, California, Vice Chair; Barbara Lee, California; Mark Pocan, Wisconsin; Katherine Clark, Massachusetts; Lois Frankel, Florida; Cheri Bustos, Illinois; Bonnie Watson Coleman, New Jersey; Brenda Lawrence, Michigan; Josh Harder, California | Tom Cole, Oklahoma, Ranking Member; Andy Harris, Maryland; Chuck Fleischmann, Tennessee; Jaime Herrera Beutler, Washington; John Moolenaar, Michigan; Ben Cline, Virginia |
Ex officio
| | Kay Granger, Texas |

=== 118th Congress ===
| Majority | Minority |
|---|---|
| Robert Aderholt, Alabama, Chair; Mike Simpson, Idaho; Andy Harris, Maryland; Chuck Fleischmann, Tennessee; John Moolenaar, Michigan; Julia Letlow, Louisiana; Andrew Clyde, Georgia; Jake LaTurner, Kansas; Jake Ellzey, Texas; Juan Ciscomani, Arizona | Rosa DeLauro, Connecticut, Ranking Member; Steny Hoyer, Maryland; Barbara Lee, California; Mark Pocan, Wisconsin; Lois Frankel, Florida; Bonnie Watson Coleman, New Jersey; Josh Harder, California |
Ex officio
| Kay Granger, Texas | |
