= Michigan's 98th House of Representatives district =

American legislative district

Michigan's 98th State House of Representatives district
Representative
Gregory Alexander; R–Carsonville
- Demographics: 92.5% White; 0.4% Black; 3.8% Hispanic; 0.4% Asian; 0.1% Native American; 0.4% Other; 2.4% Multiracial
- Population (2024): 91,302

Michigan's 98th House of Representatives district (also referred to as Michigan's 98th House district) is a legislative district within the Michigan House of Representatives located in parts of Lapeer, Sanilac, and Tuscola counties, as well as all of Huron County. The district was created in 1965, when the Michigan House of Representatives district naming scheme changed from a county-based system to a numerical one.

== List of representatives ==
Representative	Party	Dates	Residence	Notes
Eugene R. Cater	Democratic	1965–1966	Ludington	
Dennis O. Cawthorne	Republican	1967–1978	Muskegon	Lived in Manistee from 1967 to 1976.
Jeff Dongvillo	Democratic	1979–1980	Scottville	
Edgar W. Giese	Republican	1981–1990	Manistee	Lived in Reed City from 1981 to 1982.
William Bobier	Republican	1991–1992	Hesperia	Lived in Reed City from 1981 to 1982.
James R. McNutt	Republican	1993–1998	Midland	
Tony Stamas	Republican	1999–2002	Midland	
John Moolenaar	Republican	2003–2008	Midland	
Jim Stamas	Republican	2009–2014	Midland	
Gary Glenn	Republican	2015–2018	Midland	
Annette Glenn	Republican	2019–2022	Midland	
Gregory Alexander	Republican	2023–present	Carsonville	

== Recent elections ==
=== 2020s ===
2026 Michigan House of Representatives election
Party	Candidate	Votes	%
Republican	Gregory L. Alexander (incumbent)	30,021	72.02
Democratic	Keith Brusseau	11,665	27.98
Total votes		41,686	100
Republican hold			

2024 Michigan House of Representatives election
Party	Candidate	Votes	%
Republican	Gregory L. Alexander	38,048	74.0
Democratic	April Osentoski	13,355	26.0
Total votes		51,403	100

2022 Michigan House of Representatives election
Party	Candidate	Votes	%
Republican	Gregory L. Alexander	29,450	71.9
Democratic	Robert Mroczek	11,537	28.1
Total votes		40,987	100

2020 Michigan House of Representatives election
Party	Candidate	Votes	%
Republican	Annette Glenn	29,118	58.4
Democratic	Sarah Schulz	20,712	41.6
Total votes		49,830	100
Republican hold			

2018 Michigan House of Representatives election
Party	Candidate	Votes	%
Republican	Annette Glenn	20,209	52.0
Democratic	Sarah Schulz	18,629	48.0
Total votes		38,838	100
Republican hold			

2016 Michigan House of Representatives election
Party	Candidate	Votes	%
Republican	Gary Glenn	25,642	60.2
Democratic	Geoff Malicoat	16,975	39.8
Total votes		42,617	100
Republican hold			

2014 Michigan House of Representatives election
Party	Candidate	Votes	%
Republican	Gary Glenn	15,773	55.4
Democratic	Joan Brausch	12,705	44.6
Total votes		28,478	100
Republican hold			

2012 Michigan House of Representatives election
Party	Candidate	Votes	%
Republican	Jim Stamas	25,003	58.9
Democratic	Joan Brausch	17,453	41.1
Total votes		42,456	100
Republican hold			

2010 Michigan House of Representatives election
Party	Candidate	Votes	%
Republican	Jim Stamas	22,119	85.9
Libertarian	Longtain, J.	3,619	14.1
Total votes		25,738	100
Republican hold			

2008 Michigan House of Representatives election
Party	Candidate	Votes	%
Republican	Jim Stamas	25,977	58.0
Democratic	Garnet Lewis	18,781	42.0
Independent	Scott Wells	2	0.0
Total votes		44,763	100
Republican hold			

== Historical district boundaries ==
Map	Description	Apportionment Plan	Notes
	Lake County; Manistee County; Mason County; Muskegon County (part); Blue Lake Township; Montague; Montague Township; Whitehall; Whitehall Township; White River Township; Oceana County	1964 Apportionment Plan	
	Lake County; Manistee County (part); Excluding; Arcadia Township; Bear Lake Township; Pleasanton Township; Maple Grove Township; Springdale Township; Mason County; Muskegon County (part); Fruitland Township; Laketon Township; Montague; Montague Township; North Muskegon (part); White River Township; Oceana County; Wexford County (part); Slagle Township	1972 Apportionment Plan	
	Benzie County; Manistee County; Mason County; Oceana County	1982 Apportionment Plan	
	Gratiot County (part): Wheeler Township; Midland County	1992 Apportionment Plan	
	Midland County (part): Homer Township; Ingersoll Township; Larkin Township (part); Lincoln Township (part); Midland (part); Midland Township; Mount Haley Township; Saginaw County (part): Brady Township; Brant Township; Carrollton Township; Chapin Township; Fremont Township; Jonesfield Township; Kochville Township; Lakefield Township; Marion Township; Richland Township; Tittabawassee Township; Zilwaukee; Zilwaukee Township	2001 Apportionment Plan	
	Bay County (part): Auburn; Beaver Township; Fraser Township; Garfield Township; Gibson Township; Midland (part); Mount Forest Township; Pinconning; Pinconning Township; Williams Township; Midland County (part): Homer Township; Jerome Township; Larkin Township; Lee Township; Lincoln Township; Midland (part); Midland Township	2011 Apportionment Plan	
