= Dennis O. Cawthorne =

American politician

The Honorable Dennis O. Cawthorne

Chairman of the Mackinac Island State Park Commission
- In office 2011 – April 12, 2013
- Governor: Rick Snyder
- Preceded by: Frank J. Kelley
- Succeeded by: Richard Manoogian
- In office 1991–2007
- Succeeded by: Frank J. Kelley

Member of the Mackinac Island State Park Commission
- In office April 13, 1991 – April 12, 2013
- Governor: John Engler; Jennifer Granholm; Rick Snyder
- Preceded by: Kathy Lewand
- Succeeded by: Mary Callewaert

Member of the Michigan House of Representatives from the 98th district
- In office January 1, 1967 – December 31, 1978
- Preceded by: Eugene R. Cater
- Succeeded by: Jeff Dongvillo

Personal details
- Born: April 29, 1940 (age 86) Manistee, Michigan
- Party: Republican
- Spouse: Cynthia
- Education: Harvard Law School (J.D.); Albion College (B.A.)

Dennis O. Cawthorne is a Republican politician from Michigan who served in the Michigan House of Representatives and as a member and chairman of the Mackinac Island State Park Commission. He is a partner in the Kelley Cawthorne lobbying firm in Lansing with former Michigan Attorney General Frank J. Kelley.

== Beginnings ==
Growing up in Manistee, Cawthorne had an appetite for politics and was drawn to the Republican Party. In 1952, he formed a group dedicated to supporting Dwight D. Eisenhower's candidacy for president; Eisenhower later wrote him a letter thanking him for his efforts. Four years later, he worked on Robert P. Griffin's first campaign for Congress. After winning that election, Griffin selected Cawthorne to intern in his office in Washington, D.C.

While he was still in college, Cawthorne took a summer job loading carriages. His manager recognized his potential, and so he was made the manager of the chamber of commerce, a job he had each summer during law school.

== Lansing ==
In 1966, Cawthorne ran for the Michigan House of Representatives and was victorious. He served in the House for 12 years, four of them as Republican leader. He won admiration from the Democratic Speaker of the House Bobby Crim for his pragmatism and willingness to work out compromises. After leaving office in 1978, he was considered as a candidate for lieutenant governor with William Milliken, but the choice went to James Brickley. Effectively shut out of running for Congress, he formed a law firm with Democratic Senate majority leader William Fitzgerald which they dissolved in mid-1989.

He had a major hand in the writing of Proposal A, the major school-funding reform of the early 1990s, including convincing legislators to increase the minimum funding from $3,900 per pupil to $4,200 which had a major benefit for school districts in northern Michigan.

After leaving office in 1999, Frank J. Kelley approached Cawthorne about forming a lobbying firm. Kelley Cawthorne represents such clients as DTE Energy, Wal-Mart, and American Express.

== Mackinac Island ==
Cawthorne was appointed to the Mackinac Island State Park Commission by Governor John Engler in 1991. He was subsequently re-appointed by Governors Jennifer Granholm and Rick Snyder, stepping down in 2013.

One of his first priorities after being appointed to the commission was to reclaim some of the public land and public access that had been chipped away over the years. The commission was able to secure one mile of shoreline by acquisition and easements, as well as getting development rights.

When a proposal emerged to eliminate the park's $1.5 million budget and replace it with a per capita tax on visitors coming by ferry, Cawthorne quietly but effectively killed the proposal, putting the money back in the budget in a diplomatic way so that no one lost face. At least some of the park's funding comes via an endowment fund for state parks. He also successfully argued before the Michigan Public Service Commission against a proposal which would have made calls from the island to the mainland long-distance, and worked with the United States Department of Health and Human Services to grant emergency-room status to the island's medical center.

Cawthorne chaired his final commission meeting on April 11, 2013, and the trail along the shoreline of Mission Point was named in his honor. The trail's creation was also one of Cawthorne's accomplishments during the mid-1990s.

Cawthorne was the longest-serving chairman in the history of the commission. During his tenure, the Historic Mill Creek State Park was created, the Richard and Jane Manoogian Mackinac Art Museum was opened, the Old Mackinac Point Lighthouse was reopened, and restoration of buildings and walls at Fort Mackinac were all accomplished. He also oversaw major improvements to the infrastructure of Mackinac Island, particularly at the airport. Cawthorne was also the manager of the Mackinac Island Chamber of Commerce, the founder and owner of the Village Inn, and has organized the Mackinac Island Steak and Suds Society receptions in Lansing.
