= Gary Glenn =

American politician (1958–2023)

Member of the Michigan House of Representatives from the 98th district
- In office January 1, 2015 – December 31, 2018
- Preceded by: Jim Stamas
- Succeeded by: Annette Glenn

Personal details
- Born: Gary Richard Glenn; June 16, 1958
- Died: July 27, 2023 (aged 65)
- Party: Republican
- Spouse: Annette Williams Glenn
- Children: 5
- Education: Lenoir-Rhyne College

Military service
- Branch/service: United States Army Reserves; Army National Guard
- Years of service: 1990–1998

Gary Richard Glenn (June 16, 1958 – July 27, 2023) was an American politician and activist who was a member of the Michigan House of Representatives for the state's 98th district, from 2015 to 2018, as a Republican. He campaigned to prohibit compulsory union membership or financial support as a condition of employment.

He was also president of the American Family Association of Michigan, an organization that the Southern Poverty Law Center has recognized as a homophobic hate group. In his role with the American Family Association, he coauthored a 2004 amendment to the state constitution which defined marriage as solely between one man and one woman, until it was overturned by the U.S. Supreme Court's 2015 decision in Obergefell v. Hodges.

== Career ==
=== Collective bargaining ===
As executive director of the Idaho Freedom to Work Committee from 1980 to 1986, he led a successful effort to enact a state right-to-work law prohibiting collective bargaining agreements that require membership in or financial support of a labor union as a condition of employment. For his leadership of a 1986 statewide ballot campaign in which Idahoan voted to keep the law, Glenn and actor Charlton Heston were named co-recipients of the "Freedom Fighter of the Year" award by the Center for the Study of Market Alternatives, a free market think tank located at the College of Idaho.

In 2011, Glenn was a founding board member of the Michigan Freedom to Work coalition, which successfully advocated similar legislation in that state.

In 2015, the National Right to Work Committee gave him its Senator Everett M. Dirksen Award for advocacy of the Right to Work principle.

=== Military career ===
Glenn enlisted in the U.S. Army Reserves during the Persian Gulf War buildup in 1990 and served eight years in the Reserves and Army National Guard, including with the 1/183 Attack Helicopter Battalion in Boise, Idaho, and the 1460th Transportation Company headquartered in Midland, Michigan. He was named "Honor Graduate" of both Basic Combat Training and Advanced Individual Training, earned two Army Reserve Component Achievement Medals, and was honorably discharged at the rank of Sergeant in 1998.

=== American Family Association of Michigan ===
In 1999, Glenn became president of the American Family Association of Michigan, an organization dedicated to "preserving traditional Judeo-Christian family values, opposing Internet pornography in public libraries and special "protected class" status based on homosexual behavior or cross-dressing." The organization campaigned in support of a 2004 referendum to amend the Michigan constitution to define marriage as "the union of one man and one woman"; the measure was overturned by the United States Supreme Court in 2015.

=== Elective office ===
==== 2012 U.S. Senate campaign ====
Glenn ran in the 2012 United States Senate election in Michigan, campaigning against marriage and adoption by same-sex couples. He was finished in last place out of four candidates in the Republican primary, after unofficially dropping out. The winner, Pete Hoekstra, lost to incumbent Senator Debbie Stabenow in the general election.

==== State legislature ====
Glenn was elected to the Michigan House of Representatives in November 2014, representing the 98th House District, comprising the cities of Auburn, Linwood, Midland, and Pinconning, the village of Sanford, and thirteen suburban and rural townships in Bay and Midland counties.

During the 2017–18 legislative term, he served as Associate Speaker of the House Pro Tempore and as chairman of the House Energy Policy Committee. He also served on the House Communications and Technology, Insurance, and Military and Veterans Affairs committees. During the 2015–16 session, he served as vice chairman of the House Energy Policy Committee and on the House Commerce and Trade, Military and Veterans Affairs, and Tax Policy committees.

Glenn was reelected in 2016 with just over 60 percent of the vote. The Republican House Caucus elected him Associate Speaker of the House Pro Tempore, and he was appointed by the Speaker of the House to serve on the seven-member Committee on Committees, which recommended the chairs and membership of each House committee, and to serve as one of three Finance Co-chairmen of the House Republican Campaign Committee.

Glenn drew attention for his conservative voting record. He received a 100 percent score from Americans for Prosperity–Michigan and from the state chapter of the National Federation of Independent Business.

He won the American Conservative Union "Award for Conservative Excellence" for the most conservative voting record in the Michigan House in 2015, 2016, and 2017.

In 2016, he was named "House Member of the Year" by the Associated Builders and Contractors of Michigan and received NFIB's "Guardian of Small Business" Award.

In 2017, he was named "House Member of the Year" by the Michigan Propane Gas Association.

In 2014 and 2016, the Abolitionist Roundtable, an organization of conservative African-American radio talk show personalities in the metro Detroit area, named him the recipient of its annual "Champion of Liberty Award" for his work towards economically and socially conservative policies.

==== 2018 Michigan State Senate campaign ====
Gary Glenn and his wife Annette moved from Midland to Bay County's Williams Township, in order to run in the August 2018 primary for the 31st District state Senate seat, comprising Bay, Lapeer, and Tuscola counties. He received 41% of the vote, losing to former state Rep. Kevin Daley with 59%. The state's two regional monopoly utility corporations—Consumers Energy and Detroit Edison—spent an estimated $1.2 million in "dark money" advertising against Glenn, who as chairman of the House Energy Policy Committee had advocated eliminating their monopoly powers and allowing customers to buy electricity from competing energy providers. Glenn's wife, Annette Glenn, succeeded him as representative for the 98th district in the state House.

== Personal life ==
Gary Glenn was a member of Midland Baptist Church, and was a founding board member of the new Midland Optimist Club.

Glenn and his wife Annette were married in 1983, and they had five children and nine grandchildren.

Glenn was diagnosed with stage 4 metastatic prostate cancer in January 2016, which showed indications of recurrence in 2018 and 2021. He died on July 27, 2023, at the age of 65.
