= Tony Stamas =

American politician (born 1966)

Member of the Michigan Senate from the 36th district
- In office January 1, 2003 – December 31, 2010
- Preceded by: George A. McManus, Jr.
- Succeeded by: John Moolenaar

Member of the Michigan House of Representatives from the 98th district
- In office January 1, 1999 – December 31, 2002
- Preceded by: James R. McNutt
- Succeeded by: John Moolenaar

Personal details
- Born: April 9, 1966 (age 60) Midland, Michigan
- Party: Republican
- Spouse: Sara Stamas
- Relations: Jim Stamas (brother)
- Children: 2
- Education: Michigan State University
- Occupation: Politician

Tony Stamas (born 1966) was an American politician from Michigan. Stamas was a member of Michigan House of Representatives and a state senator.

== Early life ==
On April 9, 1966, Stamas was born in Midland, Michigan.

== Education ==
In 1988, Stamas earned a bachelor's degree in communications from Michigan State University.

== Career ==
Since 1998, Stamas was a Republican member of Michigan House of Representatives. In 2002, Stamas was elected to the state senate.

== Personal life ==
Stamas' wife is Sara Stamas. They live in Midland, Michigan. They have two children, including an adopted daughter, Sophia Jiuxin Stamas. Stamas is a Lutheran.
