= John Moolenaar =

American politician (born 1961)

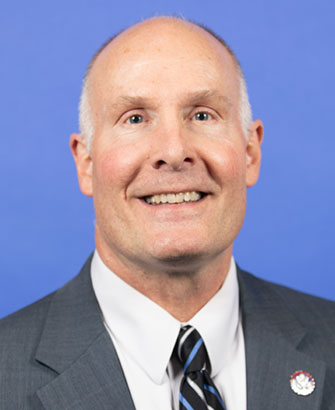
- Official portrait, 2022

Chair of the House Committee on the Chinese Communist Party
- Incumbent
- Assumed office April 24, 2024
- Preceded by: Mike Gallagher

Member of the U.S. House of Representatives from Michigan
- Incumbent
- Assumed office January 3, 2015
- Preceded by: Dave Camp (4th district); Bill Huizenga (2nd district)
- Constituency: 4th district (2015–2023); 2nd district (2023–present)

Member of the Michigan Senate from the 36th district
- In office January 1, 2011 – December 31, 2014
- Preceded by: Tony Stamas
- Succeeded by: Jim Stamas

Member of the Michigan House of Representatives from the 98th district
- In office January 1, 2003 – December 31, 2008
- Preceded by: Tony Stamas
- Succeeded by: Jim Stamas

Personal details
- Born: John Robert Moolenaar; May 8, 1961 (age 65) Midland, Michigan, U.S.
- Party: Republican
- Education: Hope College (BS); Harvard University (MPA)
- Website: House website Campaign website
- Moolenaar's voice Moolenaar supporting the Sustainable Chemistry Research and Development Act. Recorded December 9, 2019

John Robert Moolenaar (/ˈmoʊlənɑːr/ MOHL-ən-ar; born May 8, 1961) is an American politician serving as a U.S. representative from Michigan since 2015, representing the 4th district from 2015 to 2023 and the 2nd congressional district since 2023. A member of the Republican Party, he served in the Michigan House of Representatives from 2003 to 2008 and the Michigan Senate from 2011 to 2014.

== Early life and education ==
Moolenaar was born on May 8, 1961, in Midland, Michigan. His family is of Dutch ancestry. He graduated from Hope College in 1983 with a Bachelor of Science in chemistry. He later earned a Master of Public Administration degree from Harvard University in 1989.

== Career ==
Moolenaar worked at Dow Chemical Company as a chemist for eight months before entering politics. He was a member of the Midland City Council from 1997 to 2000. He was elected to the Michigan House of Representatives in 2002, where he served three terms.

Moolenaar ran for the 36th district in the 2010 Michigan Senate election. He was elected with 63.79% of the vote, defeating Democratic candidate Andy Neumann.

Moolenaar did not run for reelection to the state Senate in 2014, choosing instead to run for the U.S. House of Reprentatives. He was succeeded in the Senate by Republican Jim Stamas. Moolenaar won the August 5 Republican primary for Michigan's 4th congressional district with 52.40% of the vote, defeating Paul Mitchell and Peter Konetchy. In the general election, he won 56.49% of the vote, defeating Democratic candidate Jeff Holmes, Libertarian candidate Will Tyler White, and U.S. Taxpayers' Party candidate George Zimmer.

Moolenaar was renominated without contest in 2016, winning the general with 61.62% of the vote against Democratic candidate Debra Wirth and four third-party candidates. In 2018, Moolenaar again faced no primary opposition, defeating Democrat Jerry Hilliard with 62.62% of the vote in the general election. In 2020, he faced a rematch against Hilliard, winning this time with 65.00% of the vote.

For his first four terms, Moolenaar represented a district stretching across a large swath of Northern and Mid-Michigan, from just outside Traverse City through Midland and the outer suburbs of Saginaw, then sweeping southward to grab the outer suburbs of Lansing. However, during the 2020 United States redistricting cycle following the 2020 census, Michigan's congressional map was significantly redrawn. The old 4th was dismantled and split between three neighboring districts, with Moolenaar's home in Midland drawn into the Flint/Saginaw-based 8th district. Meanwhile, the 2nd district in Northern and West Michigan, represented by fellow Dutch-American Republican Bill Huizenga, shifted east to take in much of Moolenaar's former territory in central Michigan after losing its more urban and suburban territory near Grand Rapids. Moolenaar moved to Caledonia, an outer suburb of Grand Rapids, and ran for reelection in the new 2nd district. Huizenga had his home drawn into the new 4th district (previously the 6th district) and ran for reelection there. Moolenaar faced Tom Norton in the Republican primary for the new 2nd, winning renomination with 65.20% of the vote. In the general election, he faced Hilliard for the third time, winning with 63.68% of the vote. In 2024, Moolenaar won the Republican primary uncontested, and defeated Democratic candidate Michael Lynch with 65.14% of the vote.

== U.S. House of Representatives ==
=== Committee assignments ===
For the 118th Congress:

- Committee on Appropriations
  - Subcommittee on Agriculture, Rural Development, Food and Drug Administration, and Related Agencies
  - Subcommittee on Labor, Health and Human Services, Education, and Related Agencies
- Select Committee on Strategic Competition between the United States and the Chinese Communist Party (Chair)

=== Caucus memberships ===
- Republican Study Committee
- Republican Main Street Partnership
- U.S.-Japan Caucus
- Congressional Coalition on Adoption

== Political positions ==
In December 2020, Moolenaar was one of 126 Republican members of the House of Representatives to sign an amicus brief in support of Texas v. Pennsylvania, a lawsuit filed at the United States Supreme Court contesting the results of the 2020 presidential election, in which Joe Biden defeated incumbent Donald Trump. The Supreme Court declined to hear the case on the basis that Texas lacked standing under Article III of the Constitution to challenge the results of an election held by another state.

In 2022, Moolenaar voted against the Respect for Marriage Act.

In July 2026, Moolenaar jointly penned a letter to Prime Minister Mark Carney demanding immediate action from the Canadian government regarding wildfire smoke originating from wildfires burning nearby in Canada. This letter included the passage "Sovereignty comes with responsibility, and the responsibility to prevent a foreseeable disaster from crossing into another country's airspace has not been met". This has been perceived as mimicking threats made by U.S. President Donald Trump to make Canada the "51st state".

U.S. House of Representatives
Preceded by Dave Camp	Member of the U.S. House of Representatives from Michigan's 4th congressional district 2015–2023	Succeeded by Bill Huizenga
Preceded by Bill Huizenga	Member of the U.S. House of Representatives from Michigan's 2nd congressional district 2023–present	Incumbent
Preceded by Mike Gallagher	Chair of the House Chinese Communist Party Committee; 2024–present	Incumbent
U.S. order of precedence (ceremonial)
Preceded by Barry Loudermilk	United States representatives by seniority 139th	Succeeded by Seth Moulton
