= Robert L. McKenzie =

American anthropologist

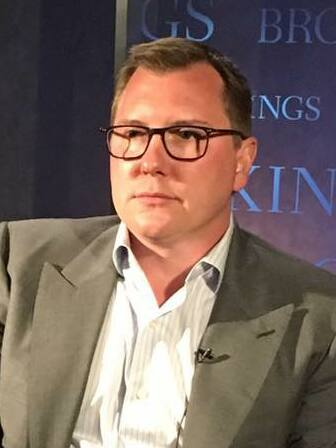
- Born: Dearborn, Michigan, U.S.
- Education: University of London (PhD); Georgetown University (MA); Michigan State University (BA)
- Scientific career
- Fields: Politics, Domestic Policy, International Affairs, National Security, Forced Migration, Refugees
- Workplaces: Brookings Institution Columbia University New America Foundation

Robert L. McKenzie is an American domestic and foreign policy analyst, public commentator, and scholar of the Middle East and North Africa. An anthropologist by training, his current work largely focuses on forced migration, displaced persons, refugees, and diaspora-related issues. McKenzie is a director and senior fellow at the New America Foundation, a former non-resident senior fellow and visiting fellow at the Brookings Institution, a former Democratic nominee for Michigan's 11th congressional district, and a former Senior Advisor at the US Department of State. McKenzie is also an adjunct assistant professor of international and public affairs at Columbia University.

== Early life, education, and published books ==
McKenzie was born in Dearborn, Michigan, and raised in Greater Detroit.

McKenzie played multiple sports in high school and was captain of the varsity basketball team at Crestwood High School in Dearborn Heights, Michigan. At Michigan State University, and after multiple unsuccessful attempts, McKenzie walked-on to the varsity basketball team coached by Tom Izzo. His total playing time was less than one minute, earning McKenzie the title "the Moonlight Graham of college basketball."

He earned a bachelor's in economics from Michigan State University, a master's in security studies from Georgetown University, and a doctorate in anthropology from the School of Oriental and African Studies at the University of London. McKenzie has co-edited a book with Professor Alessandro Triulzi entitled "Long Journeys: African Migrants on the Road," published by Brill Publishers in 2013. In his latest book project, McKenzie explores large-scale displacement and protracted refugee situations in the Middle East and North Africa.

== New America Foundation ==
McKenzie is a director and senior fellow at the New America Foundation. He is the principal investigator for an interactive project entitled Exploring Online Hate, a joint project between New America Foundation and the Anti-Defamation League. This interactive dashboard monitors hateful activity within a network of over 1,000 accounts on Twitter in near real time. According to the dashboard, these accounts were identified based on their regular use of hateful content directed against protected groups, starting with 40 extremist seed accounts and expanding out from there. The approach, according to the dashboard, is designed to enable a deeper understanding of the themes, misinformation, and disinformation being disseminated by this network.

McKenzie is also the principal investigator for an interactive project cataloguing anti-Muslim activities at the state and local level in America. It is most comprehensive and up-to-date source of publicly available information about anti-Muslim activities in the United States. The incidents, sorted into six categories, are compiled in an interactive graph and in maps showing their geographic distribution in absolute numbers as well as per capita.

== Brookings Institution ==
At the Brookings Institution, McKenzie's research and writing centered on the Syrian refugee crisis and Muslim communities in the West. In 2016, McKenzie wrote for, appeared with, or was cited by: Bloomberg News; CNN; Detroit Free Press; The Guardian; The New York Times; The Washington Post; and The Washington Times. McKenzie also convened or participated in major Brookings events: On February 19, McKenzie provided introductory remarks for a public discussion between Leon Wieseltier and Syrian refugees entitled "Who we really are: A conversation with Syrian refugees in America." On March 15, 2016, McKenzie moderated a public conversation on the Syrian refugee crisis with Filippo Grandi, the UN High Commissioner for Refugees. McKenzie was also involved in a Brookings research project looking at the migrant and refugee situation at the local and city-level in Germany.

On October 18, 2016, McKenzie participated in a public conversation entitled "How should the next president counter violent extremism?" The conversation was moderated by Indira Lakshmanan and highlighted McKenzie's recent policy brief entitled "Countering Violent Extremism in America: Policy recommendations for the next president."

== 2014 election ==
In the 2014 election cycle, McKenzie was the Democratic nominee in Michigan's 11th congressional district. When he launched his campaign in late October 2013, former Congressman Patrick Murphy (PA-D) referred to McKenzie as "a fantastic candidate -- a top-tier candidate for the DCCC (Democratic Congressional Campaign Committee) -- and he'll be an even better congressman...He'll be one of the top 10 recruits in the country for the DCCC." In December 2013, the DCCC added McKenzie to its elite jump starter program. McKenzie won the Democratic nomination in the primary on August 5, 2014. In late September 2014, The Hill named McKenzie one of five sleeper races to watch in the country. The DCCC had reserved 1 million dollars in media ad buys for McKenzie for the general election. McKenzie lost in the general election to David Trott, by a margin of 140,435 votes to 101,681 votes (56.2% to 40.7%). The 2014 election cycle had the worst voter turnout in 72 years in America, which contributed to a crushing blow for Democrats across the country.
