= Manatee Memorial Hospital =

- Universal Health Services

Geography
- Location: 206 Second Street East, Bradenton, Florida, United States
- Coordinates: 27°29′49″N 82°33′44″W

Organization
- Care system: Private
- Type: General

Services
- Standards: Joint Commission
- Emergency department: Yes
- Beds: 319

History
- Founded: February 23, 1953

Links
- Website: manateememorial.com
- Lists: Hospitals in Florida

Manatee Memorial Hospital (MMH) is a private 319-bed health care facility located in Bradenton, Florida.

== History ==
Manatee Memorial Hospital was first proposed in 1939 by the Bradenton Women's Club and other prominent members of the community. Its construction was delayed with the United States' entry into World War II with initial fundraising beginning in 1947. The hospital would open as Manatee Veterans Memorial Hospital on February 23, 1953, with a capacity of 100 beds. The hospital was renamed to its current name on July 1, 1963, to prevent people confusing the hospital as a Veterans Administration facility due to "Veterans" in its name.
