= Jim Stamas =

American politician

Member of the Michigan Senate from the 36th district
- In office January 1, 2015 – January 1, 2022
- Preceded by: John Moolenaar
- Succeeded by: Michele Hoitenga

Majority Floor Leader of the Michigan House of Representatives
- In office January 1, 2011 – January 1, 2015
- Preceded by: Kathy Angerer
- Succeeded by: Aric Nesbitt

Member of the Michigan House of Representatives from the 98th district
- In office January 1, 2009 – January 1, 2015
- Preceded by: John Moolenaar
- Succeeded by: Gary Glenn

Personal details
- Born: February 17, 1965 (age 61) Midland, Michigan
- Party: Republican
- Spouse: Marsha Stamas
- Children: 2
- Education: Northwood University; Delta College
- Website: Official website

Military service
- Branch: United States Army; Michigan National Guard
- Unit: 3rd U.S. Infantry Regiment (The Old Guard) (Army); 460th Service and Support Company (Guard)

Jim Stamas (born February 17, 1965) was a member of the Michigan State Senate and member of the Michigan House of Representatives.

== Political career ==
Serving the community led Jim to offer his talents in public office. First, he served locally as a Midland Township Trustee from 1997–2004 and then served as a Midland County Commission from 2005–2008.

It was during Michigan’s economic crisis that Jim decided to take his talents to the state level where he handily won office in 2008 to the 98th District seat in the Michigan House of Representatives. Tony Stamas, Jim’s brother, had previously served in the House, and Jim knew some of what lay before him. While serving his first term in the minority, Jim co-sponsored several pieces of legislation working with his colleagues on the other side of the aisle. Various legislation became public acts that dealt with health care, taxation, public trails, foster care, and business regulation.

In 2010, the Republicans captured the majority of the House of Representatives, and after Jim won re-election, he was chosen to be the Majority Floor Leader by the Republican Caucus. While managing the flow of legislation and activities on the floor, Jim was the primary sponsor of 9 bills signed into law during the 2011-2012 term dealing with a range of topics including taxation, unemployment insurance, and business regulation. After winning re-election in 2012, Jim was again elected by his caucus to serve as Majority Floor Leader. He had 5 additional pieces of legislation signed into law including issues dealing with public utilities, economic development, and business regulation. More important to Jim were 2 public acts that dealt with causes near to his own heart: supporting veterans through a fund raising registration plate, and establishing the Michigan State Capitol Commission to preserve the Capitol for future generations. Notably, Jim served as Vice Chair of the last Michigan Capitol Committee.

During Jim’s time as majority floor leader, Jim played a pivotal role in key legislation passing the House and ultimately being signed into law. This included Right To Work, Education Reform, elimination of outdated regulations, and the Detroit Bankruptcy. More importantly, he worked with other Senate and House leaders and the Governor to have a balanced budget signed into law months before the constitutional deadline which assured local governments what to expect in state funding. Described by his colleagues as a Momma Bird, he cared about his colleagues. During Jim’s 2014 House farewell speech, he cited his biggest accomplishment of restoring the right to speak of majority and minority members.

Term limited in 2014, Jim ran for and won election to the Michigan State Senate. From the start, Jim dove into Appropriations where he quickly became a budget expert in addition to his previously established policy expertise. This would catapult him to becoming the Senate Appropriations Chair for the 2019–2022 terms. He also served as Chair of the Senate Fiscal Agency.

While in his first Senate term, Jim continued focusing on policies that mattered most to Michiganders: taxation, transportation, education, business regulation, economic development, emergency services, housing, veterans, and children’s advocacy. During these four years, Jim had 45 bills signed into law. During his time as Appropriations Chair, Jim naturally focused on the budget but still found time to deal with other critical policies including economic development, pharmaceuticals, insurance and education. Jim sponsored 25 public acts during his last four year term.

Moreover, Jim dealt with several state and community disasters during his time in office including the COVID-19 pandemic, the Gaylord tornado, and the Midland dam failures. He served the state and his community by bringing state resources to help impacted residents rebuild their lives. During Jim’s Senate farewell speech, he noted the importance of people working together to improve the state and the lives of the people with it. Jim's efforts were recognized by many organizations including earning Senator of the Year accolades twice by MIRS News, a respected capitol news organization.

After being term-limited in 2022, Jim returned to public service in 2024, winning a seat on the Midland County Commission in District 4. At its meeting to elect leadership, Jim was elected Chair of the Board. In April 2026, Jim announced he was moving out of his district and would be resigning. During his time on the commission, he served as a county representative to many boards and commissions. His resignation took effect on May 4.

On May 14, Jim was selected to replace Midland County Clerk Ann Manary who retired. Two days later, Jim became the new Midland County Clerk.

== Post Political Life ==
Following Jim's lengthy public service career, he started a small business, K.E.R. Strategies, that utilizes his extensive knowledge, expertise, and results to help others navigate local and state issues.

== Early life ==
The eldest of four, Jim was born to Nickolas and Betty Stamas in Midland, Michigan. They were a close knit family. Growing up, Jim worked at the family restaurant, Pizza Sam’s where he learned the value of hard work and serving others. After graduation from Midland High School, Jim enlisted in the United States Army. During this time, he married his high school sweetheart, Marsha. After completing active service as part of the 3rd U.S. Infantry Regiment (Old Guard), Jim continued serving in the Michigan National Guard as part of the 460th Service and Support Company.

Family was always important, and Jim and Marsha welcomed two children to their family while Jim continued his education by earning an Associate’s Degree in Business from Delta College and a Bachelor’s Degree in Business from Northwood University. As the family grew, Jim established his business career as a licensed real estate agent and a project manager at Case Systems. Over time, Jim returned to the family business, Pizza Sam’s, where he eventually became the general manager and owner.

Jim prioritized community service and volunteer work. He served on the Midland Downtown Development Authority, Midland Downtown Business Association and on the Midland County Planning Commission.
