= List of bridges on the National Register of Historic Places in Michigan =

This is a list of bridges and tunnels on the National Register of Historic Places in the U.S. state of Michigan. There are 98 bridges and 3 tunnels in this list.

| Name | Image | Built | Listed | Location | County | Type |
|---|---|---|---|---|---|---|
| 12 Mile Road–Kalamazoo River Bridge | | 1920 | 1999-12-22 | Marshall; 42°16′12″N 85°3′41″W | Calhoun | Concrete arch |
| 23 Mile Road–Kalamazoo River Bridge | 23 Mile Road-Kalamazoo River Bridge | 1922 | 1999-12-22 | Marengo; 42°16′6″N 84°50′52″W | Calhoun | Concrete through girder |
| Ada Covered Bridge | | 1867 | 1970-02-16 | Ada; 42°57′8″N 85°29′10″W | Kent | Howe truss |
| American Legion Memorial Bridge | | 1930 | 2000-01-07 | Traverse City; 44°45′41″N 85°37′15″W | Grand Traverse | Concrete arch bridge |
| Antietam Street–Grand Trunk Railroad | | 1930 | 2000-02-18 | Detroit; 42°20′43″N 83°2′5″W | Wayne | I-beam stringer |
| Ash Street–Sycamore Creek Bridge | | 1918 | 2000-01-14 | Mason; 42°34′45″N 84°26′51″W | Ingham | T-Beam |
| Avery Road–Galien River Bridge | | by 1923 | 1999-12-17 | New Troy; 41°52′27″N 86°33′17″W | Berrien | Through girder bridge |
| Ball Road-Little Salt Creek Bridge | | 1901 | 1999-12-17 | Jasper Township; 43°31′0″N 84°33′32″W | Midland | Pratt truss-leg bedstead |
| Bay City Bascule Bridge | | 1938 | 1999-11-30 | Bay City; 43°34′46″N 83°53′59″W | Bay | Shezer rolling lift bascule |
| Beach-Garland Street-Flint River Bridge | | 1921 | 1999-12-09 | Flint; 43°1′11″N 83°41′39″W | Genesee | Luten arch bridge |
| Bell Road Bridge | | 1891 | 1996-11-29 | Pinckney; 42°24′5″N 83°54′32″W | Washtenaw | Pratt through truss |
| Blossomland Bridge | | 1948 | 1999-12-17 | Saint Joseph; 42°6′45″N 86°28′40″W | Berrien | Rolling-lift bascule bridge |
| Business Route M-21–Plaster Creek Bridge | | 1916 | 1999-12-17 | Wyoming; 42°56′9″N 85°41′14″W | Kent | Spandrel arch |
| Canyon Falls Bridge | | 1948 | 1999-11-30 | L'Anse Township; 46°37′31″N 88°28′13″W | Baraga | Steel girder ribbed deck arch |
| Center Road – Tittabawassee River Bridge | | 1927 | 1999-11-30 | James Township; 43°23′37″N 84°0′54″W | Saginaw | Steel stringer bridge |
| Cheboygan Bascule Bridge | Cheboygan Bascule Bridge | 1940 | 1999-12-09 | Cheboygan; 45°38′45″N 84°28′22″W | Cheboygan | Scherzer rolling lift bridge |
| Chestnut Street–Grand Trunk Railroad | | 1929 | 2000-02-18 | Detroit; 42°20′41″N 83°2′3″W | Wayne | I-beam stringer |
| Chicagon Mine Road–Chicagon Creek Bridge | | 1910 | 1999-12-17 | Bates Township; 46°5′43″N 88°30′31″W | Iron | Concrete slab bridge |
| County Road 557–West Branch Escanaba River Bridge | | ca. 1928 | 1999-12-17 | Wells Township; 46°8′48″N 87°27′45″W | Marquette | Steel stringer |
| County Road C117–Pike River Bridge | | 1914 | 1999-12-09 | Chassell; 47°1′7″N 88°31′37″W | Houghton | Steel stringer bridge |
| County Road I-39–Rapid River Bridge | | 1916 | 1999-12-09 | Masonville Township; 46°1′22″N 86°58′44″W | Delta | Through girder bridge |
| Delhi Bridge | | 1890 | 2008-9-4 | Scio; 42°20′1.41″N 83°48′32.72″W | Washtenaw | Pratt through truss |
| Denton Road–Sparks Foundation Park Pond Bridge | | 1931 | 2000-01-28 | Jackson; 42°13′38″N 84°25′55″W | Jackson | Steel I-Beam Stringer |
| Derby Street-Grand Trunk Western Railroad Bridge | | 1930 | 2000-01-27 | Birmingham; 42°33′15″N 83°12′11″W | Oakland | Concrete T-beam |
| Division Avenue–Plaster Creek Bridge | | 1914 | 1999-12-17 | Grand Rapids; 42°55′5″N 85°39′58″W | Kent | Spandrel arch bridge |
| East River Road–North Hickory Canal Bridge | | 1945 | 2000-02-04 | Grosse Ile; 42°5′46″N 83°9′2″W | Wayne | Concrete slab bridge |
| Fallasburg Covered Bridge | | 1871 | 1972-03-16 | Lowell; 42°58′51″N 85°19′38″W | Kent | Lattice-work truss |
| Ferry Street–Thorofare Canal Bridge | | 1947 | 2000-02-18 | Grosse Ile; 42°8′17″N 83°9′23″W | Wayne | Concrete slab |
| Fifty-Seventh Street Bridge | | 1879, 1899 | 1998-04-01 | Manlius Township; 42°39′5″N 86°6′25″W | Allegan | Iron truss swing bridge |
| Forest Route 157–Tamarack River Bridge | | 1916 | 1999-12-17 | Stambaugh Township; 46°14′50″N 88°58′41″W | Iron | Concrete through girder |
| Fort Street–Pleasant Street and Norfolk & Western Railroad Viaduct | | 1928 | 2000-02-18 | Detroit; 42°17′4″N 83°8′54″W | Wayne | I-beam stringer |
| Fruitport Road–Pettys Bayou Bridge | | 1948 | 1999-12-17 | Spring Lake Township; 43°5′22″N 86°10′31″W | Ottawa | Steel stringer |
| Gibraltar Road–Waterway Canal Bridge | | 1932 | 2000-02-10 | Gibraltar; 42°5′42″N 83°11′26″W | Wayne | T-beam bridge |
| Gillespie Street-Clinton River Bridge | | 1936 | 2000-01-27 | Pontiac; 42°37′34″N 83°17′52″W | Oakland | Concrete rigid frame |
| Gugel Bridge | Gugel Bridge | 1904, 1919, 1920 | 2000-03-15 | Frankenmuth Township; 43°19′44″N 83°46′35″W | Saginaw | Pratt through truss bridge |
| Indian Lake Road Stone Arch Bridge | | 1891 | 2005-07-22 | Orion; 42°47′51″N 83°14′47″W | Oakland | Stone arch railroad bridge |
| Indian Trail Road–Belle River Bridge | | 1937 | 2000-01-28 | China Township; 42°46′30″N 82°32′58″W | St. Clair | Warren pony truss |
| Jackson Branch Bridge No. 15 | Jackson Branch Bridge No 15 | 1896 | 2001-12-04 | Raisin Township; 41°56′35″N 83°56′46″W | Lenawee | Pratt truss railroad bridge |
| Jeddo Road–South Branch Mill Creek Drain Bridge | | 1939 | 2000-01-28 | Brookway Township; 43°8′36″N 82°50′13″W | St. Clair | Steel I-beam stringer |
| Jefferson Avenue–Huron River and Harbin Drive–Silver Creek Canal Bridges | Jefferson Avenue–Huron River and Harbin Drive–Silver Creek Canal Bridges | 1930 | 2000-02-10 | Brownstone; 42°2′32″N 83°12′52″W | Wayne | Jefferson Avenue: Steel I-beam stringer Harbin Drive: Concrete arch |
| King Road–Whitefish River Bridge | | 1919 | 1999-11-30 | Limestone Township; 46°15′49″N 87°5′34″W | Alger | Concrete through girder |
| Lake Leelanau Narrows Bridge | | 1939 | 2000-01-27 | Leland Township; 44°58′53″N 85°42′42″W | Leelanau | Steel I-beam stringer |
| Lilley Road–Lower Rouge River Bridge | | 1923, 1933 | 2000-02-10 | Canton Township; 42°16′46″N 83°27′24″W | Wayne | Camelback pony truss |
| Lincoln Road–Pine River Bridge | | 1922 | 1999-12-09 | Seville; 43°22′45″N 84°49′59″W | Gratiot | Arched through girder bridge |
| M-26–Cedar Creek Culvert | Cedar Creek Culvert | ca. 1930 | 1999-12-17 | Eagle Harbor Township; 47°27′20″N 88°9′0″W | Keweenaw | Multiplate steel culvert |
| Old M-95–Michigamme River Bridge | | 1910 | 1999-12-17 | Republic Township; 46°14′48″N 88°0′46″W | Marquette | Luten arch |
| M-26–Silver River Culvert | Silver River Culvert | ca. 1930 | 1999-12-17 | Eagle Harbor Township; 47°27′47″N 88°4′20″W | Keweenaw | Multiplate steel culvert |
| M-28–Sand River Bridge | | 1939 | 1999-11-30 | Onota Township; 46°29′42″N 87°6′27″W | Alger | Concrete rigid frame bridge |
| M-28–Tahquamenon River Bridge | | 1926 | 1999-11-30 | Chippewa Township; 46°20′46″N 84°57′32″W | Chippewa | Steel plate girder bridge |
| M-50–Sandstone Creek Bridge | | 1927 | 2000-01-14 | Tompkins; 42°22′23″N 84°32′42″W | Jackson | Steel deck plate girder |
| M-72–Au Sable River Bridge | | 1935 | 1999-12-09 | Grayling; 44°39′35″N 84°42′44″W | Crawford | Steel rigid frame bridge |
| M-86–Prairie River Bridge | | 1923, 1938 | 2000-02-04 | Nottawa; 41°55′8″N 85°28′54″W | St. Joseph | Camelback pony truss |
| M-88–Intermediate River Bridge | | ca. 1930 | 1999-12-17 | Bellaire; 44°58′43″N 85°12′36″W | Antrim | Steel stringer |
| M-94 (old)–Au Train River Bridge | | 1914 | 1999-11-30 | Au Train Township; 46°26′0″N 86°50′11″W | Alger | Steel through girder bridge |
| Mackinac Trail – Carp River Bridge | | 1920 | 1999-12-17 | St. Ignace Township; 46°1′6″N 84°43′6″W | Mackinac | Spandrel arch |
| Main Street–Black River Bridge | | 1923 | 1999-12-09 | Bessemer Township; 46°28′25″N 90°0′5″W | Gogebic | Through girder bridge |
| Mansfield Road–Michigamme River Bridge | | 1915 | 1999-12-17 | Mansfield Township; 46°6′49″N 88°12′59″W | Iron | Filled spandrel arch bridge |
| Marantette Bridge | | ca. 1900 | 2001-06-25 | Mendon; 41°59′56″N 85°27′30″W | St. Joseph | Pratt through-truss bridge |
| Martin Road Bridge | | | 1991-07-12 | Corunna; 42°58′8″N 84°3′21″W | Shiawassee | Pratt through-truss bridge |
| Masters Road–Belle River Bridge | | 1935 | 2000-01-27 | Riley Township; 43°50′24″N 82°51′29″W | St. Clair | Steel I-beam stringer |
| Mill Street–South Branch Raisin River Bridge | | ca. 1925 | 2000-01-14 | Brooklyn; 42°6′36″N 84°14′44″W | Jackson | Concrete arch |
| Morseville Bridge | | 1885 | 1990-04-05 | Taymouth Township; 43°14′12″N 83°52′6″W | Saginaw | Pratt through truss |
| Mower Road – Cole Drain Bridge | | 1920 | 1999-12-17 | Spaulding Township; 43°19′38″N 83°58′7″W | Saginaw | Through girder |
| North Saginaw Road–Salt River Bridge | | 1920 | 1999-12-17 | Jerome Township; 43°40′41″N 84°23′40″W | Midland | Parker pony truss |
| North Watervliet Road–Paw Paw Lake Outlet Bridge | | 1916 | 1999-12-17 | Watervliet; 42°12′28″N 86°15′0″W | Berrien | Deck arch bridge |
| Ocqueoc Falls Highway–Ocqueoc River Bridge | | 1920 | 1999-12-17 | Ocqueoc Township, Michigan; 45°23′21″N 84°3′33″W | Presque Isle | Spandrel arch |
| Parke Lane Road–Thorofare Canal Bridge | | 1929 | 2000-02-04 | Grosse Ile; 42°10′5″N 83°8′38″W | Wayne | Concrete arch bridge |
| Parker Road–Charlotte River Bridge | | 1914 | 2000-01-28 | Bruce Township; 46°21′45″N 84°17′24″W | Chippewa | Warren pony truss |
| Parshallburg Bridge | Parshallburg Bridge | 1889 | 1994-10-12 | Oakley; 43°8′38″N 84°8′7″W | Saginaw | Thacher through truss |
| Planter Road–Jackson Creek Bridge | | 1923 | 1999-12-09 | Wakefield Township; 46°30′48″N 89°58′12″W | Gogebic | Through girder bridge |
| Porter Hollow Embankment and Culvert | | 1885 | 2001-09-24 | Algoma Township; 43°9′57″N 85°34′1″W | Kent | Stone arch culvert |
| Powers Highway-Battle Creek Bridge | Powers Highway Battle Creek Bridge | by 1910 | 2000-01-07 | Brookfield Township; 42°27′16″N 84°48′24″W | Eaton | Pony truss bridge |
| Residential Drive-Townline Brook Bridge | | by 1875 | 2000-01-07 | Walton Township; 42°28′39″N 84°57′11″W | Eaton | Bowstring pony truss bridge |
| Second Street Bridge | Second Street Bridge sign | 1886 | 1980-06-11 | Allegan; 42°31′52″N 85°50′53″W | Allegan | Pratt through truss |
| Second Street–Gun River Bridge | | ca. 1926 | 1999-12-17 | Hooper; 42°30′56″N 85°33′46″W | Allegan | Concrete girder |
| Seventh Street–Black River Bridge | | 1932 | 2000-02-04 | Port Huron; 42°58′34″N 82°25′39″W | St. Clair | Single-leaf trunnion bascule |
| Sixth Street Bridge | Sixth Street Bridge | 1886 | 1976-08-13 | Grand Rapids; 42°58′36″N 85°40′27″W | Kent | Pratt high truss |
| South Pointe Drive–Frenchman's Creek Bridge | | 1939 | 2000-02-18 | Grosse Ile; 42°6′9″N 83°10′20″W | Wayne | T-beam |
| South Union Street–Boardman River Bridge | | 1931 | 2000-01-07 | Traverse City; 44°45′43″N 85°37′25″W | Grand Traverse | Built-up girder bridge |
| St. Clair River Tunnel | | 1889, 1891 | 1970-10-15 | Port Huron; 42°57′36″N 82°25′59″W | St. Clair | Subaqueous tunnel |
| Stancer Road–North Coldwater River Bridge | | 1888 | 1999-12-22 | Union Township; 42°1′17″N 85°5′27″W | Branch | Pratt through truss |
| State Street Bridge | | 1906 | 1995-11-29 | Bridgeport; 43°21′29″N 83°52′57″W | Saginaw | Pratt through truss |
| Stony Creek Bridge | | ca. 1880 | 1999-11-30 | Olive Township; 42°54′54″N 84°34′48″W | Clinton | Queenpost pony truss bridge |
| Ten Curves Road–Manistique River Bridge | | 1923 | 1999-12-17 | Germfask Township; 46°14′49″N 85°55′28″W | Schoolcraft | Through girder |
| Thomson Road–Air Line Railroad Bridge | | 1919 | 1999-12-22 | Howard Township; 41°53′35″N 86°11′41″W | Cass | Concrete T-beam |
| Thornapple River Drive Bridge | | 1927 | 1990-04-18 | Cascade Township; 42°56′23″N 85°29′29″W | Kent | Camel back bridge |
| Trowbridge Road-Grand Trunk Western Railroad Bridge | | 1931 | 2000-01-28 | Bloomfield Hills; 42°34′50″N 83°13′51″W | Oakland | Concrete continuous T-beam |
| Trunk Line Bridge No. 1 | | 1914 | 1999-12-17 | Michigamme Township; 46°31′42″N 88°0′13″W | Marquette | Through girder |
| Trunk Line Bridge No. 237 | | 1918 | 2000-01-14 | Ransom; 41°46′11″N 84°34′24″W | Hillsdale | Concrete Deck Arch |
| US 12 Bridges | | 1948 | 2000-02-04 | Dearborn; 42°19′34″N 83°9′43″W | Wayne | Stringer; deckplate girder |
| US 12–St. Joseph River Bridge | | 1922 | 1991-04-05 | Mottville; 41°48′0″N 85°45′25″W | St. Joseph | Camelback bridge |
| US 2–Iron River Bridge | | 1917 | 1999-12-09 | Iron River; 46°6′7″N 88°30′0″W | Iron | Spandrel arch bridge |
| US 31–Pentwater River Bridge | | 1955 | 1999-12-20 | Weare Township; 43°44′29″N 86°23′22″W | Oceana | Steel plate deck girder |
| US 41–Fanny Hooe Creek Bridge | Fanny Hooe Creek Bridge | 1928 | 1999-12-17 | Grant Township; 47°28′1″N 87°52′18″W | Keweenaw | Spandrel arch bridge |
| US-12–Coldwater River Bridge | | 1920 | 1999-12-22 | Coldwater; 41°56′40″N 85°1′52″W | Branch | Pratt pony truss |
| US 41 (old)–Backwater Creek Bridge | | 1918 | 1999-12-09 | Baraga Township; 46°45′16″N 88°29′41″W | Baraga | Warren pony truss |
| Upper Twin Falls Bridge | | 1910 | 2012-12-12 | Breitung Township; 45°52′39″N 88°04′43″W | Dickinson | Camelback through truss |
| Vernier Street–Swan Creek Bridge | | 1922 | 2000-01-28 | Ira Township; 42°40′50″N 82°39′29″W | St. Clair | Concrete through girder |
| Wadhams Road–Pine River Bridge | | 1928 | 2000-01-28 | Saint Clair Township; 42°52′17″N 82°33′28″W | St. Clair | Concrete through girder |
| Waltz Road–Huron River Bridge | | 1924 | 2000-02-10 | Huron Township; 42°9′40″N 83°24′10″W | Wayne | Camelback pony truss |
| West Jefferson Avenue–Rouge River Bridge | | 1922 | 2000-02-10 | River Rouge; 42°16′50″N 83°7′44″W | Wayne | Double-leaf steel trunnion bascule |
| West Mitchell Street Bridge | | 1930 | 1986-09-10 | Petoskey; 45°22′26″N 84°57′39″W | Emmet | Concrete T-beam |
| West Second Street–Swartz Creek Bridge | | 1920 | 1999-12-09 | Flint; 43°0′38″N 83°41′58″W | Genesee | Luten arch bridge |
