= South Pointe =

South Pointe is the name of the following locations:

- South Pointe Drive – Frenchman's Creek Bridge, in Grosse Ile, Michigan
- South Pointe High School (Phoenix, Arizona)
- South Pointe High School (Rock Hill, South Carolina)
- South Pointe Middle School, in Diamond Bar, California
- South Pointe Park, in Miami Beach, Florida
