= Chicagon Mine Road–Chicagon Creek Bridge =

Bridge in Bates Township, Michigan, US

- U.S. National Register of Historic Places
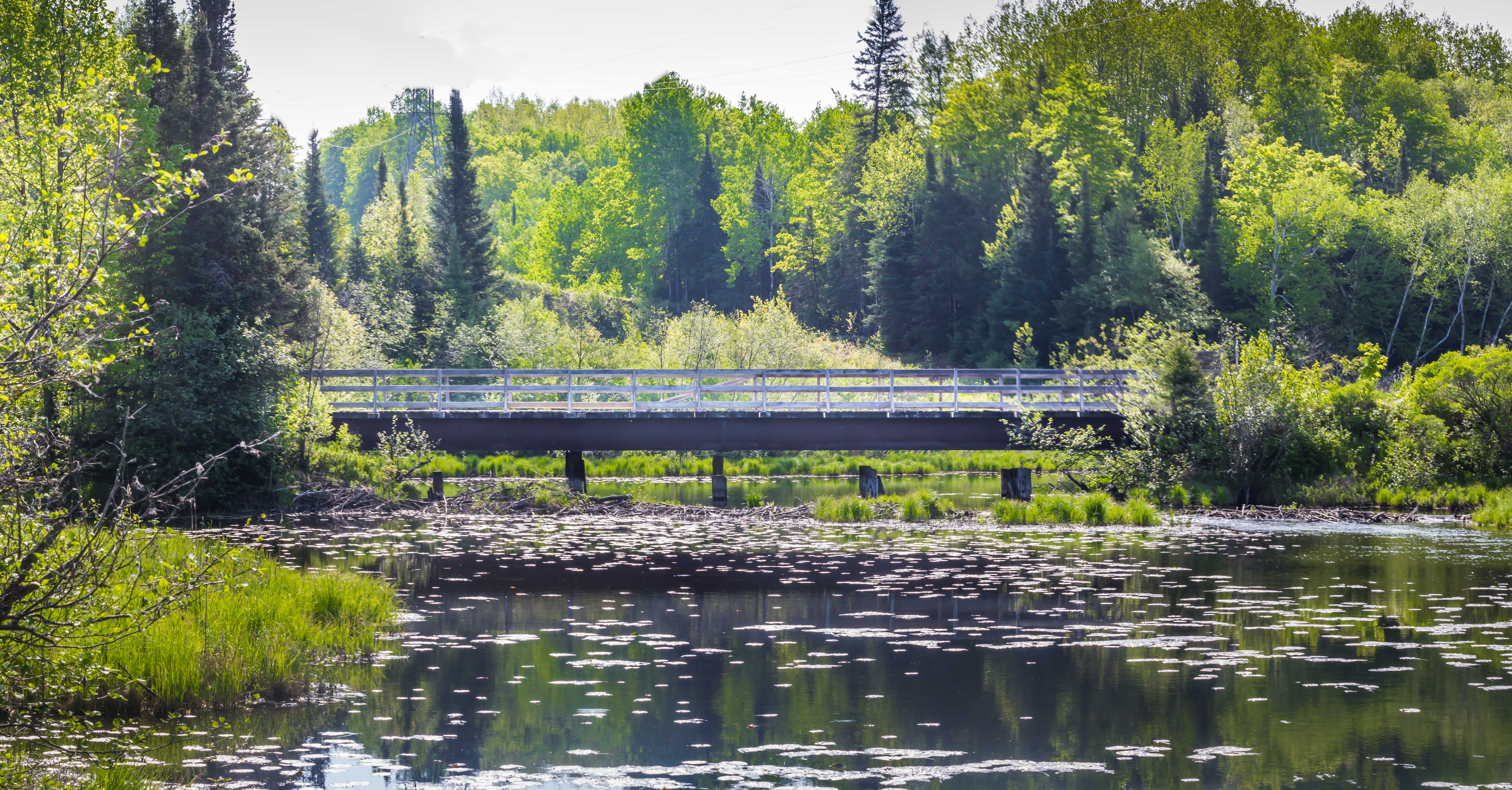

- Location within Michigan Location within the United States
- Interactive map
- Location: Chicagon Mine Road over Chicagon Creek, Bates Township, Michigan
- Coordinates: 46°5′43″N 88°30′31″W
- Area: less than 1 acre (0.4 ha)
- Built: 1910
- Architectural style: Concrete slab bridge
- MPS: Highway Bridges of Michigan MPS
- NRHP reference No.: 99001521
- Added to NRHP: December 17, 1999

The Chicagon Mine Road–Chicagon Creek Bridge is a bridge located on Chicagon Mine Road over Chicagon Creek in Bates Township, Michigan. It was listed on the National Register of Historic Places in 1999.

== History ==
The Chicagon Mine Road–Chicagon Creek Bridge was built in 1910, likely for the Iron County Road Commission. In the era before the standardization of bridge design by the Michigan State Highway Department, this bridge is a notable early example of a concrete slab bridge. The bridge is still in good condition.

== Description ==
The Chicagon Mine Road–Chicagon Creek Bridge has a main span 25 feet (7.6 m) long and 16.3 feet (5.0 m) wide. The bridge consists of a single concrete slab supported by concrete abutments with angled concrete wingwalls. The bridge has simple details, with the interior surface of the rails containing recessed panels, with "September 7, 1910" etched in the coping of one guardrail, and "DB" etched in the other.
