= US 31–Pentwater River Bridge =

Bridge in Hart, Michigan, USA

- Coordinates: 43.7075°N 86.3559°W
- Carries: Oceana Drive

Characteristics
- Total length: 270 feet (82 m)
- Width: 63.1 feet (19.2 m)
- Longest span: 102 feet (31 m)
- No. of spans: 3

History
- Construction cost: $266,564
- US 31–Pentwater River Bridge
- U.S. National Register of Historic Places
- Location within Michigan Location within the United States
- Coordinates: 43.7075°N 86.3559°W
- NRHP reference No.: 99001534
- Added to NRHP: December 20, 1999

Location
- Interactive map of US 31–Pentwater River Bridge

The US 31–Pentwater River Bridge is a three-span steel bridge that carries Oceana Drive (Old US Highway 31) over the Pentwater River in northern Hart, Michigan. It is listed on the National Register of Historic Places.

== History ==
Prior to the construction of the current span, US 31 spanned the river in Hart on a bridge that had become a significant bottleneck by the early 1950s. In 1954, a replacement structure was designed by the Michigan State Highway Department. The bridge was designated as a Federal Aid project and the contract for construction was awarded to Gene Fewell. The bridge was completed the next year for $266,564.

Since construction, the bridge has been altered little and has undergone repairs only for maintenance reasons. In 1988, the bridge was rehabilitated by replacing the pins and hangers of the non-redundant suspended spans. The bridge was listed on the National Register of Historic Places on December 20, 1999, and the Michigan Department of Transportation placed it on their list of historic bridges.

== Design ==
The bridge has three spans and a total length of 270 feet (82 m). The two anchor spans are 84 feet (26 m) long and cantilever over the piers to support the 102-foot (31 m) center span, 60 feet (18 m) of which is suspended. The deck is 56 feet (17 m) wide and the total width of the bridge is 63.1 feet (19.2 m). The bridge is essentially two separate bridges, each with its own structure, separated by a 4-foot-wide (1.2 m) divider strip and connected by a 1 inch (2.5 cm) joint along the bridge's length. The bridge has two lanes in each direction and the sidewalks are 2.5 feet (0.76 m) wide.

The steel girder design of the US 31–Pentwater River Bridge was widely used by State Highway Department in the 1930s and 1940s. The department used similar designs as early as 1905, but it was not until about 1930 that steel manufacturing techniques could produce a span greater than 45 feet (14 m).

== See also ==
- List of bridges on the National Register of Historic Places in Michigan
- National Register of Historic Places listings in Oceana County, Michigan
