= US 12 Bridges =

- U.S. National Register of Historic Places
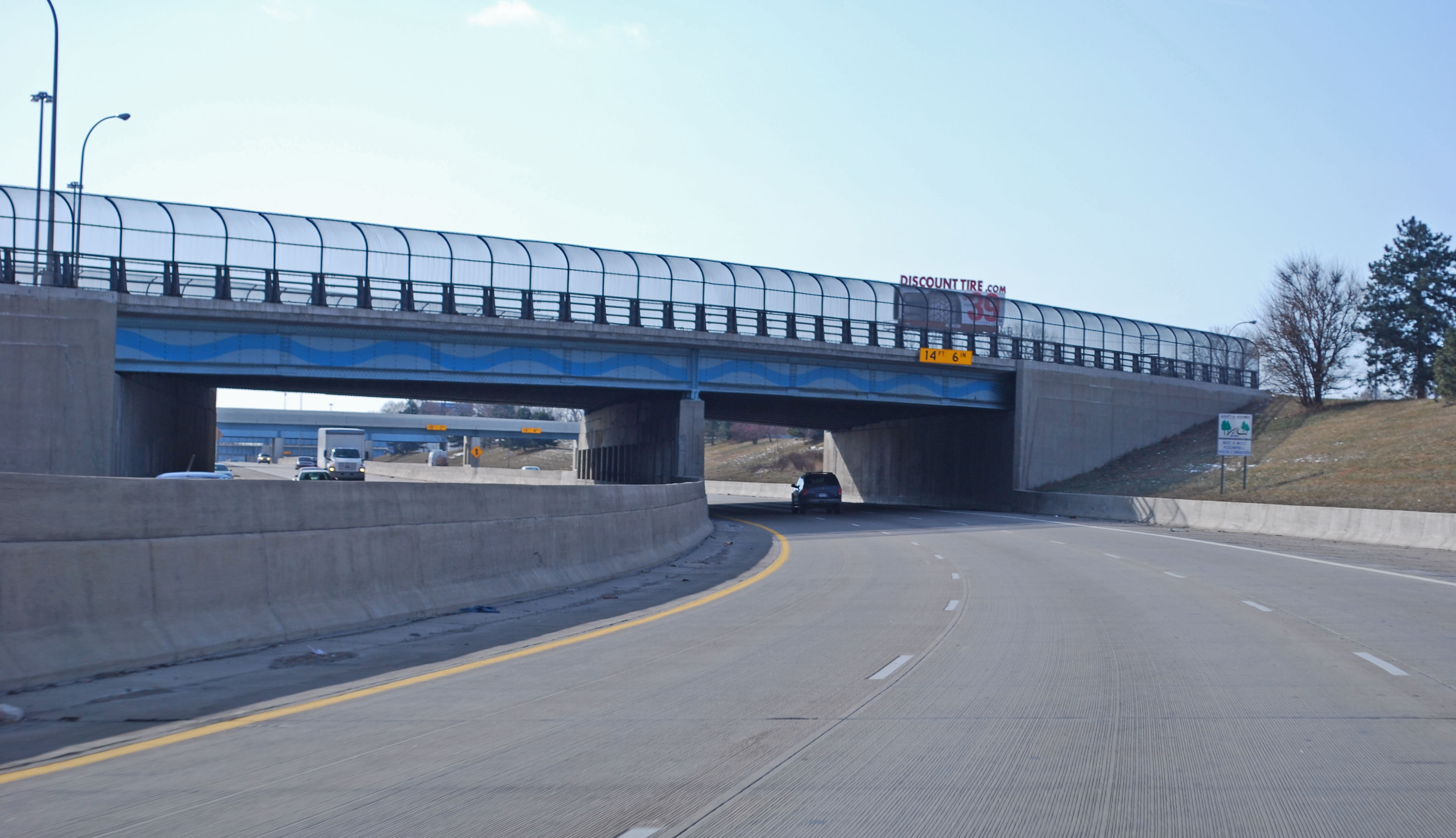
- Bridge from westbound I94

- Location within Michigan Location within the United States
- Interactive map
- Location: US 12 over I-94 and westbound I-94 ramp, Dearborn, Michigan
- Coordinates: 42°19′35″N 83°9′39″W
- Area: less than one acre
- Built: 1948
- Built by: Darin and Armstrong
- Architect: Michigan State Highway Department
- Architectural style: stringer; deckplate girder
- MPS: Highway Bridges of Michigan MPS
- NRHP reference No.: 00000041
- Added to NRHP: February 4, 2000

The US 12 Bridges are two bridges carrying U.S. Route 12 (US 12) over Interstate 94 (I-94) and the westbound I-94 ramp in Dearborn, Michigan. They were listed on the National Register of Historic Places in 2000.

== History ==
The utility of constructing a cross-town expressway through Detroit was recognized as early as the 1920s. Planning continued off and on through the early 1940s, when the state began anticipating post-war projects. Originally called the "Crosstown Expressway," the Detroit City Council approved a petition to rename the proposed stretch the "Edsel Ford Expressway" in April 1946. The 14-mile (23 km) Edsel Ford would ultimately require the construction of over 70 structures, of which the US-12 bridges are two.

Work began on the freeway in 1948, starting on the Detroit–Dearborn border, with the US 12 bridges being the first structures opened for bidding. The firm of Darin & Armstrong won the construction contract with a bid of $925,000, and began work in August 1948. The bridges were completed by August 1949. A ribbon cutting ceremony, presided over by State Highway Commissioner Charles Ziegler, was held on August 17.

== Description ==
Of the two bridges, the span over I-94 is the longer. The shorter span over the westbound I-94 ramp is 50 feet (15 m) long and 90 feet (27 m) wide. The bridge has eighteen stringers, more closely spaced in the center of the deck to support what once was a streetcar line. Channels are laid over and riveted onto the stringers. The railing, installed in 1967, has a precast base and horizontal pipe.

== Gallery ==
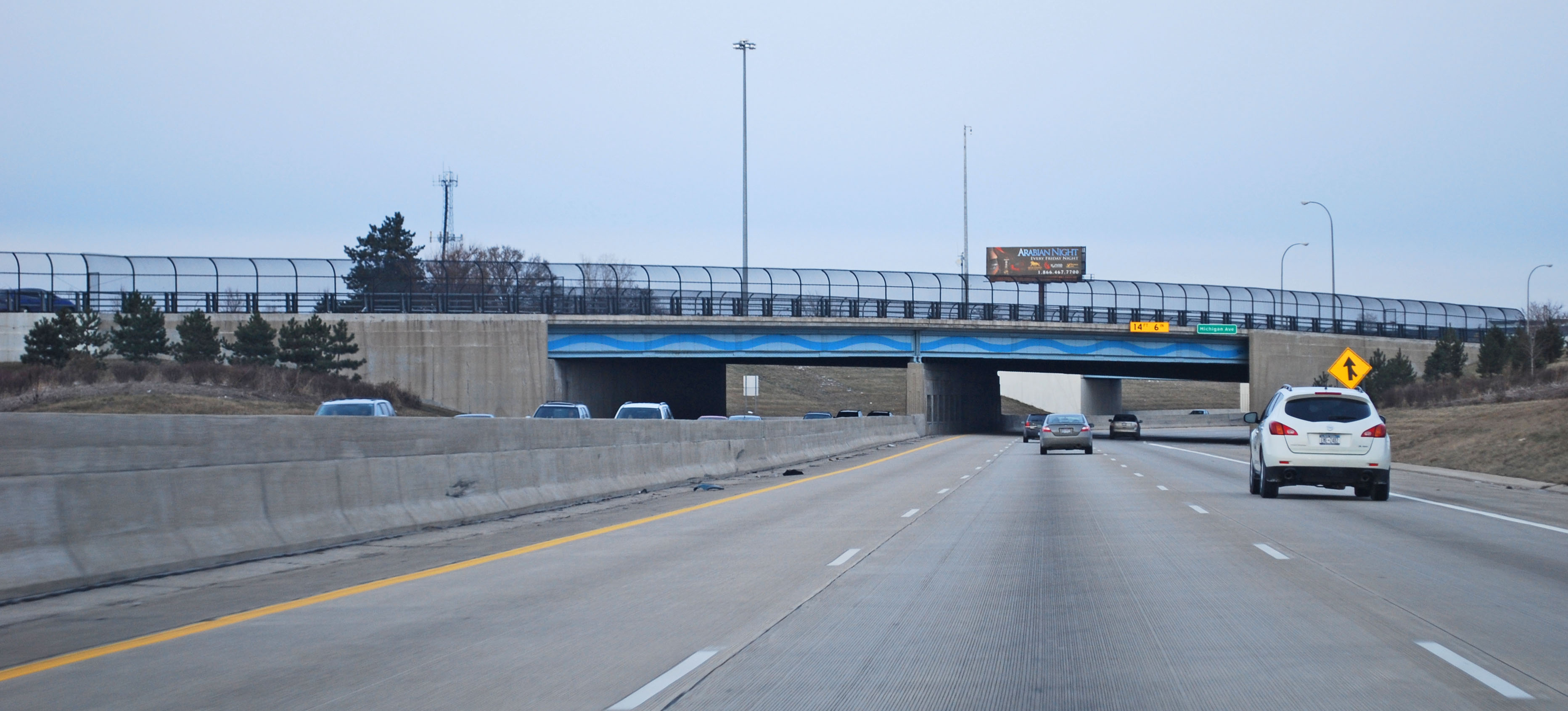
Bridge from eastbound I94

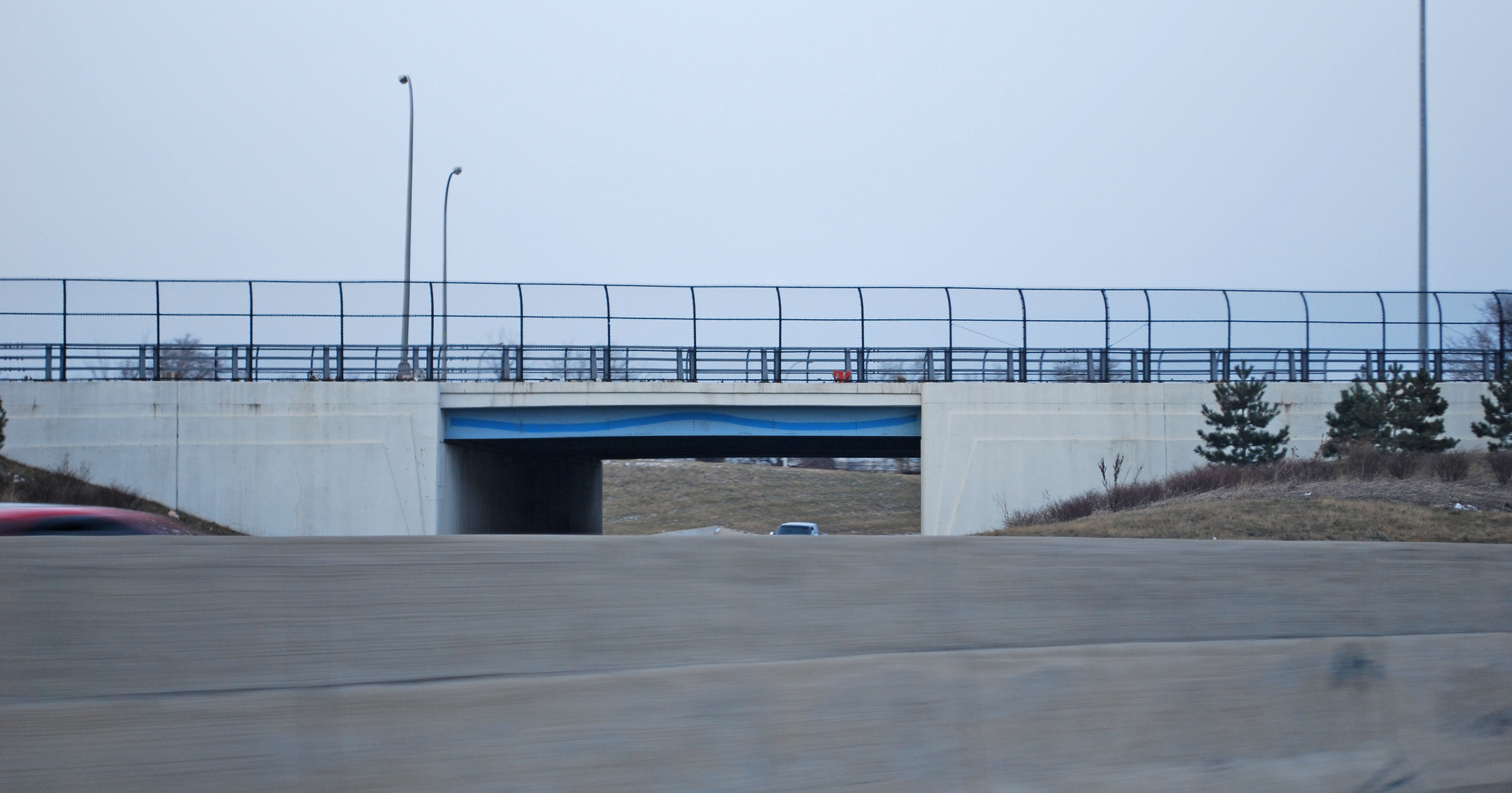
Onramp bridge

== See also ==
- List of bridges on the National Register of Historic Places in Michigan
- National Register of Historic Places listings in Wayne County, Michigan
