= Ash Street-Sycamore Creek Bridge =

- U.S. National Register of Historic Places
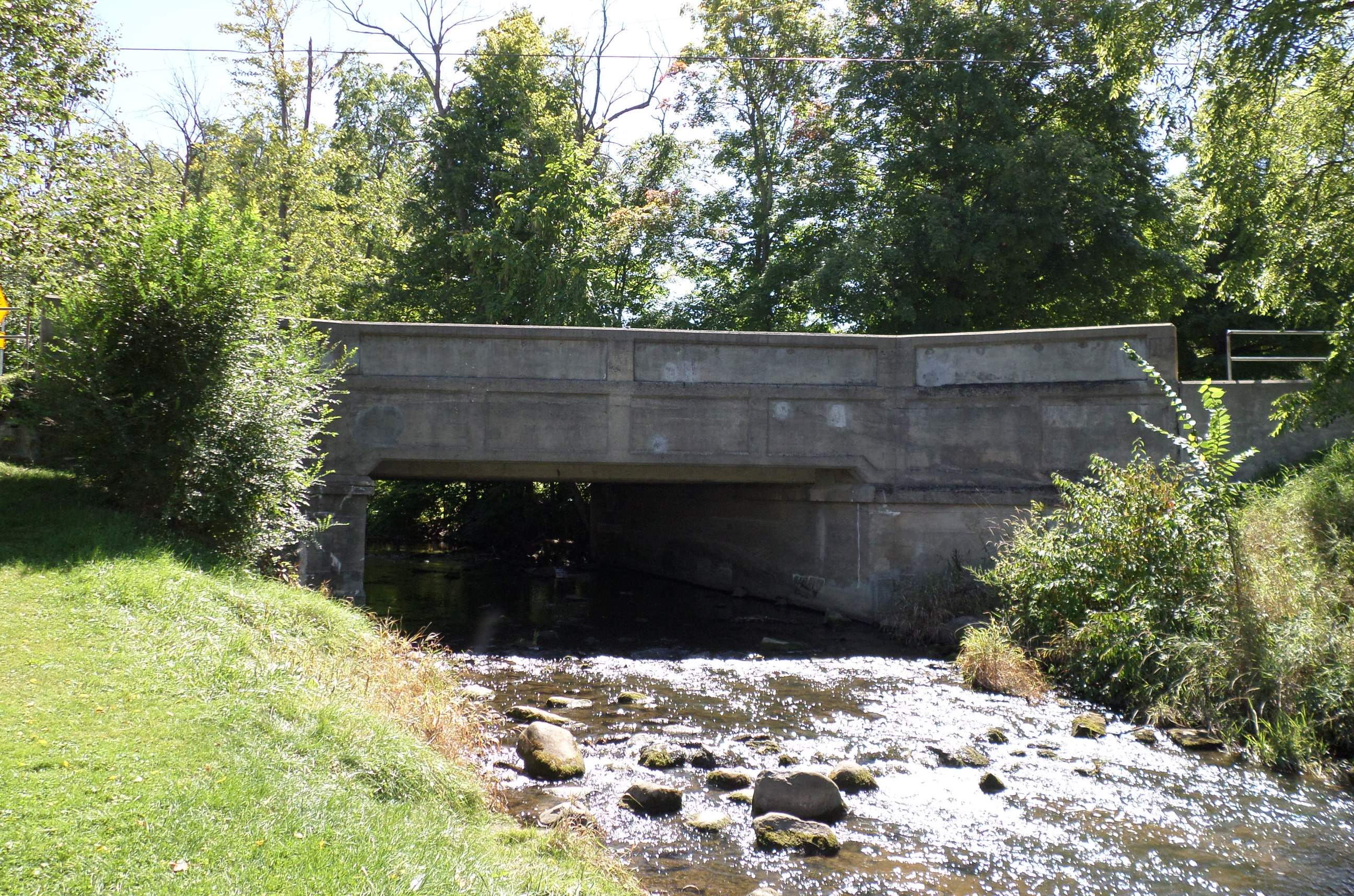
- Interactive map
- Location: MI-36 over Sycamore Cr., Mason, Michigan
- Coordinates: 42°34′45″N 84°26′51″W
- Area: less than one acre
- Built: 1918
- Built by: J. Morehouse
- Architect: W.E. Zimmer
- Architectural style: T-Beam
- MPS: Highway Bridges of Michigan MPS
- NRHP reference No.: 99001673
- Added to NRHP: January 14, 2000

The Ash Street-Sycamore Creek Bridge is a historic bridge located on Ash Street (MI-36) over Sycamore Creek in Mason, Michigan . It was listed on the National Register of Historic Places in 1999. It is one of the oldest T-beam bridges in Michigan.

== History ==
The Ash Street bridge was constructed by the city of Mason in 1918. It was apparently designed by W.E. Zimmer, who used a unique design unlike that developed by the Michigan State Highway Department. The bridge was constructed by contractor J. Morehouse. At some point, control of the bridge was turned over to the department, who had authority for state trunklines. As of 2010, the bridge was still in use and in good condition.

== Description ==
The Ash Street bridge is a concrete T-beam bridge with a 29-foot span, skewed over Sycamore Creek. It has a 56.6-foot wide deck with a 36-foot wide roadway, which is lined with solid concrete parapet railings with four recessed panels. Sidewalks are on both sides inside the railings. The substructure has straight concrete abutments with angled wing walls. Information about the bridge construction is etched into the concrete on the inside center of the north railing.
