= Powers Highway-Battle Creek Bridge =

- U.S. National Register of Historic Places
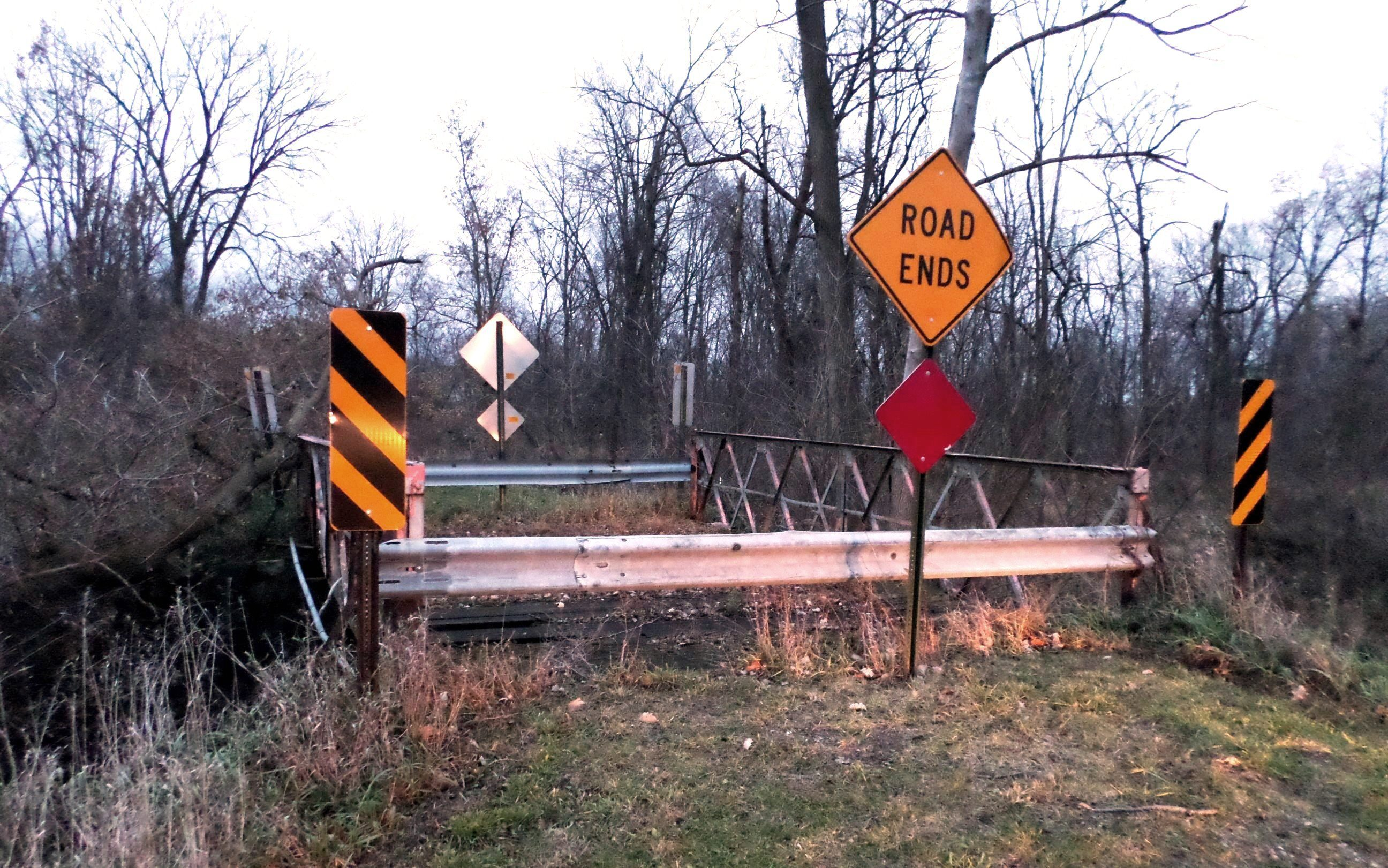
- Interactive map
- Location: Powers Hwy. over Battle Cr., Brookfield Township, Michigan
- Coordinates: 42°27′16″N 84°48′24″W
- Area: less than one acre
- Built: c. 1910
- Architectural style: Pony truss bridge
- MPS: Highway Bridges of Michigan MPS
- NRHP reference No.: 99001653
- Added to NRHP: January 7, 2000

The Powers Highway-Battle Creek Bridge is a bridge that formerly carried Powers Highway over Battle Creek in Brookfield Township, Michigan. It was listed on the National Register of Historic Places in 2000. The bridge is a double-intersection Warren truss, a design noted for its extremely lightweight members and low cost. It is the only known example of its type in Michigan.

== History ==
The exact history of this bridge is unknown; however, the Michigan Department of Transportation lists a construction date of 1910. The bridge was likely constructed by the township as an inexpensive option.

The bridge is closed to traffic.

== Description ==
The Powers Highway Bridge is a rigid-connected lattice pony truss bridge. It has a 25-foot span and a 15.8 foot-wide roadway on a 16.3-foot wide deck. The deck is constructed of a single layer of wood deck over six steel I-beam stringers and two outside channels. The bridge sits on a masonry abutment substructure.
