= Fruitport Road–Pettys Bayou Bridge =

- U.S. National Register of Historic Places
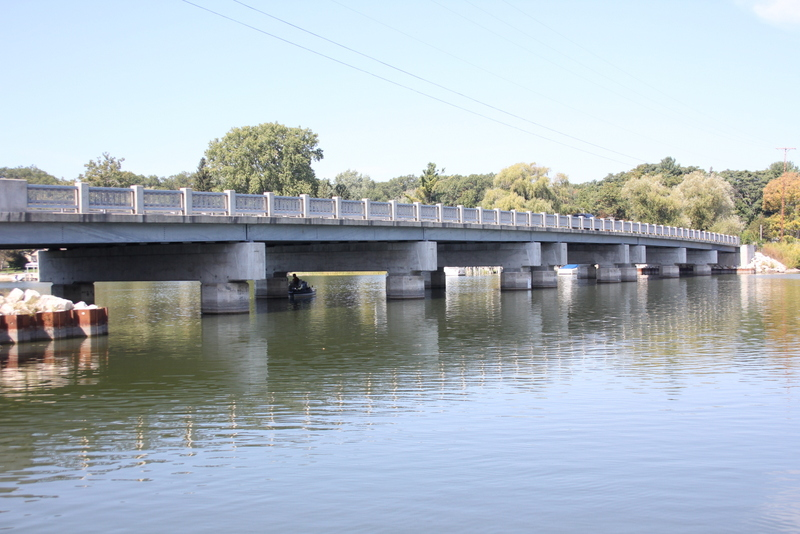

- Location within Michigan Location within the United States
- Interactive map
- Location: Fruitport Rd. over Pettys Bayou, Spring Lake Township, Michigan
- Coordinates: 43°5′22″N 86°10′31″W
- Area: less than one acre
- Built: 1948
- Built by: L.W. Lamb
- Architect: Michigan State Highway Department
- Architectural style: steel stringer
- MPS: Highway Bridges of Michigan MPS
- NRHP reference No.: 99001535
- Added to NRHP: December 17, 1999

The Fruitport Road–Pettys Bayou Bridge, also known as the Bowen Bridge, is a multiple span bridge carrying Fruitport Road over Petty's Bayou (a portion of Spring Lake) in Spring Lake Township, Michigan.

== History ==
The Ottawa County Road Commission undertook a county-wide road and bridge improvement project, starting in the 1910s. In 1921, the commission hired Carl Bowen, a former civil engineer at the Michigan State Highway Department. Bowen supervised the construction of numerous projects during his 30+ year tenure with the commission, including the construction of this bridge in 1948. The design of the bridge was completed by the Michigan State Highway Department in 1947, and L.W. Lamb of Holland was contracted to construct the bridge. Construction started in February 1948, and the bridge was opened to traffic in December. The bridge was dedicated to Carl Bowen at the request of the local Chamber of Commerce. It has continued to carry traffic since its construction. The superstructure was reconstructed, and the bridge repaved, in 2008.

== Description ==
The Fruitport Road–Pettys Bayou Bridge is a multiple-span concrete-and-steel bridge, consisting of nine spans stretching 418 feet. Five spans are 55 feet in length, two are 53 feet, and two are 18 feet. Each span contains eight lines of rolled I-beams, braced laterally. The foundations of the bridge are unusually deep, due to the marshy soil below and the substructure units are of a lightweight cellular construction to reduce the load on the soil, and spread it out over a large area. The superstructure is of standard Michigan State Highway Department design, with corbeled steps on the bulkheads and concrete piers, ornamental steel guardrails, and a concrete deck.
