= Indian Lake Road Stone Arch Bridge =

- U.S. National Register of Historic Places
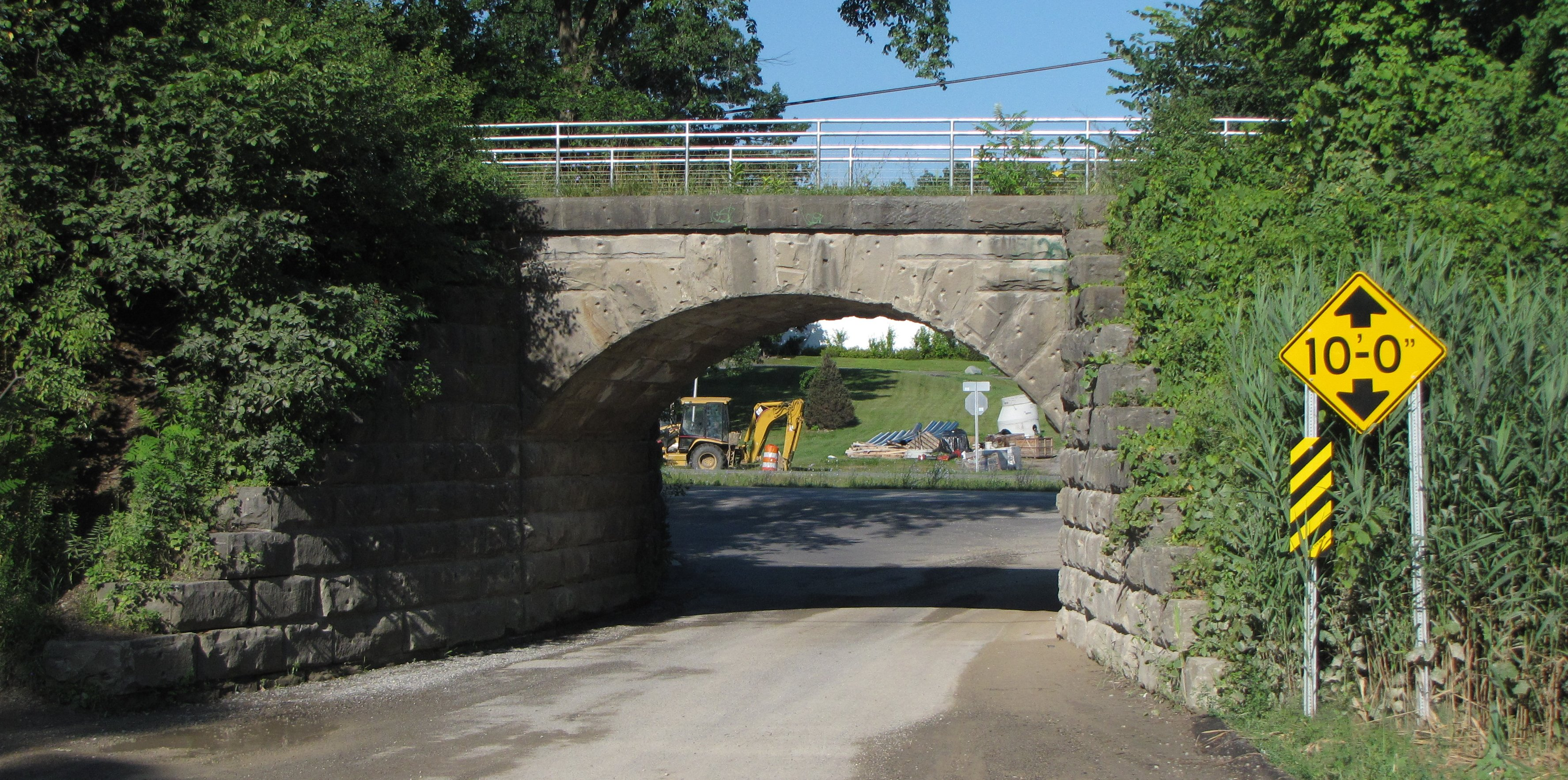
- Interactive map
- Location: Indian Lake Rd., E of M24, Orion, Michigan
- Coordinates: 42°47′51″N 83°14′47″W
- Area: less than one acre
- Built: 1891
- Architectural style: Stone arch railroad bridge
- NRHP reference No.: 05000712
- Added to NRHP: July 22, 2005

The Indian Lake Road Stone Arch Bridge is a former railroad bridge which now carries a hiking/biking path over Indian Lake Road, just east of M-24 near Orion, Michigan. It is one of only a small number of stone arch railroad bridges known to exist in Michigan. The bridge was listed on the National Register of Historic Places in 2005.

== History ==
The Detroit & Bay City Railroad was chartered in 1871. They constructed a line starting in Detroit which reached the Lake Orion area in 1872 and was completed through to Bay City the next year. The Michigan Central Railroad leased the line starting in 1881, and it operated afterwards as part of the Michigan Central system.

There is no record of the construction of this bridge, but a date stone in the bridge wing wall is carved with "1891," and the bridge construction is similar to three or four other known Michigan Central stone arch structures constructed at about that time.

== Description ==
The Indian Lake Road Stone Arch Bridge is a single-span arch constructed of yellowish-brown rock-faced sandstone. The arch spans 19 feet between abutments and is 12 feet high. The entire bridge is nearly 16 feet high and is 21 feet wide from face to face. The bridge formerly carried a railroad line.

The arch of the bridge begins atop the fifth course of masonry above ground level. Two pairs of side-by-side voussoirs support a single regular horizontal block of stone, which flank the central four voussoirs and the keystone. Atop the arch is a projecting one course high stone cap. The bridge wingwalls are built of regular blocks of stone, with the courses aligned to the abutments. A stone at the far east end of the southeastern wingwall displays "1891" carved in its upper surface.

== See also ==
- National Register of Historic Places listings in Oakland County, Michigan
