= Townline Brook Bridge =

- Residential Drive-Townline Brook Bridge
- U.S. National Register of Historic Places
- Interactive map
- Location: Residential Drive over Townline Br., Walton Township, Michigan
- Coordinates: 42°28′39″N 84°57′11″W
- Area: less than one acre
- Built: c. 1875
- Built by: Wrought Iron Bridge Company
- Architectural style: Bowstring pony truss bridge
- MPS: Highway Bridges of Michigan MPS
- NRHP reference No.: 99001652
- Added to NRHP: January 7, 2000

The Townline Brook Bridge, also known as the Bennett Park Bridge, is a bridge carrying a private residential driveway over Townline Brook in Walton Township, Michigan, near 5882 Battle Creek Road. It is the only remaining 1870s bowstring truss bridge in the state of Michigan. It was listed on the National Register of Historic Places in 2000.

== History ==
This bridge was constructed by the Wrought Iron Bridge Company of Canton Ohio. The original location of this bridge is unknown, but it was likely placed near Charlotte, Michigan in the late 19th century. At some point in the early 20th century it was moved to Bennett Park in Charlotte. In 1968 it was moved again to the present location.

== Description ==
This bridge is a bowstring truss bridge, patented by bridge designer Squire Whipple in 1841. It is a six-panel, pin-connected structure resting on earthen embankments in a farmyard. It is composed of an upper cord made of back-to-back channels with battens and a cover plate and a lower chord made of paired flat bars. The outside and center verticals are X-shaped members and the diagonals are crossed rods with turnbuckles. The floor is made of I-beams U-bolted to the superstructure.
