= Division Avenue–Plaster Creek Bridge =

- U.S. National Register of Historic Places
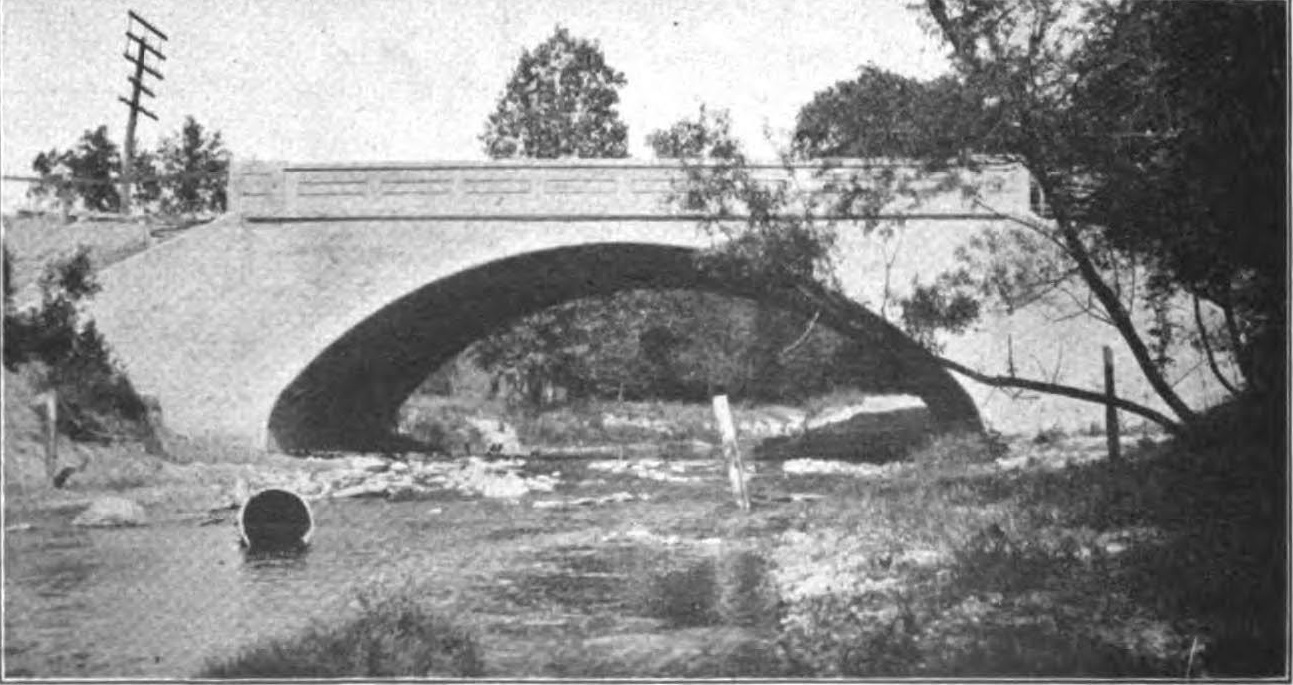
- Bridge as constructed, before 1935 widening

- Location within Michigan Location within the United States
- Interactive map
- Location: Division Ave. over Plaster Creek, Grand Rapids, Michigan
- Coordinates: 42°55′5″N 85°39′58″W
- Built: 1914
- Built by: Illinois Bridge Co.
- Architect: Michigan State Highway Department, C.V. Dewart
- Architectural style: Spandrel arch bridge
- MPS: Highway Bridges of Michigan MPS
- NRHP reference No.: 99001523
- Added to NRHP: December 17, 1999

The Division Avenue–Plaster Creek Bridge was a historic bridge in Grand Rapids, Michigan, carrying Division Avenue over Plaster Creek. It was listed on the National Register of Historic Places in 1999. The bridge was demolished and replaced in 2007.

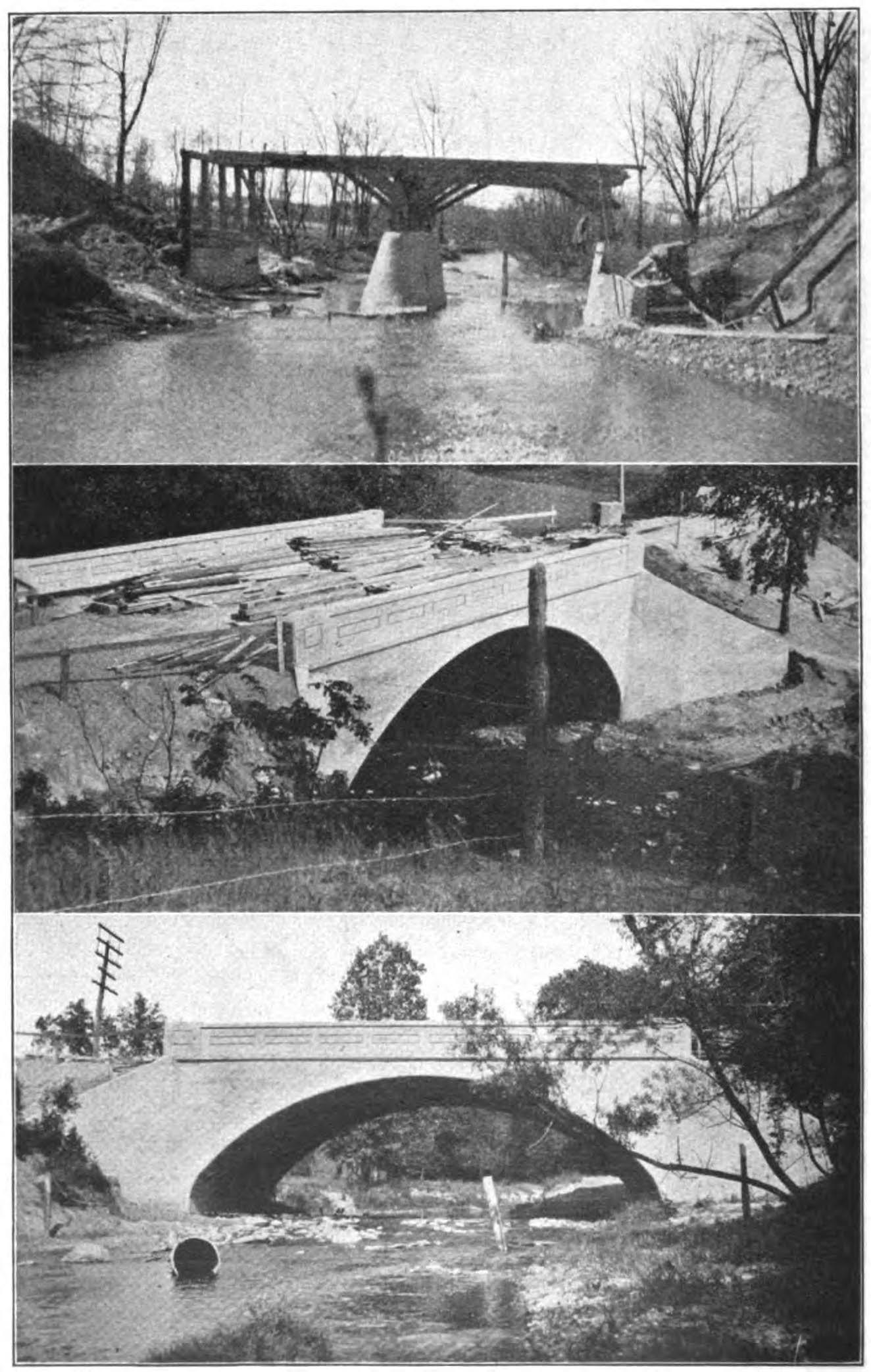
Construction of the bridge in 1914, showing old wooden bridge at top

== History ==
In 1913, the state of Michigan authorized the designation of a trunkline network of roads, stipulating that the Michigan State Highway Department would design, build and maintain any large trunkline bridges if the local government improved the adjacent three miles of road. A mainline route south of Grand Rapids was soon designated as a trunkline. However, the route crossed Plaster Creek on a timber pile bridge which was heavily deteriorated. In 1914, the Kent County Road Commission improved the adjacent three-mile stretch of the road, and the state agreed to replace the Plaster Creek bridge. The new bridge, designated Trunk Line Bridge No. 3, was designed by Michigan State Highway Department Bridge Engineer C.V. Dewart. The state contracted with the Illinois Bridge Company of Chicago to build the bridge, which was completed later in 1914 at a cost of $6,063.09. The route was later incorporated into US-131, and in 1935 the state widened the bridge from its original 28-foot roadway width to a 43-foot width. During this process the original concrete guardrails were replaced with standard steel rails. The bridge continued to carry vehicular traffic in to the 21st century. However, it was replaced in 2007.

== Description ==
The Division Avenue Bridge was a 50-foot long, 43-foot wide spandrel arch bridge. It had an asphalt-surfaced roadway that with concrete sidewalks on each side. Standard steel rails lined the outside of the bridge. The arch was elliptical, and ended in massive concrete abutments on each end of the bridge. It had a tapered arch ring cast integrally into the plain-faced concrete walls.
