= Jeddo Road–South Branch Mill Creek Drain Bridge =

- U.S. National Register of Historic Places
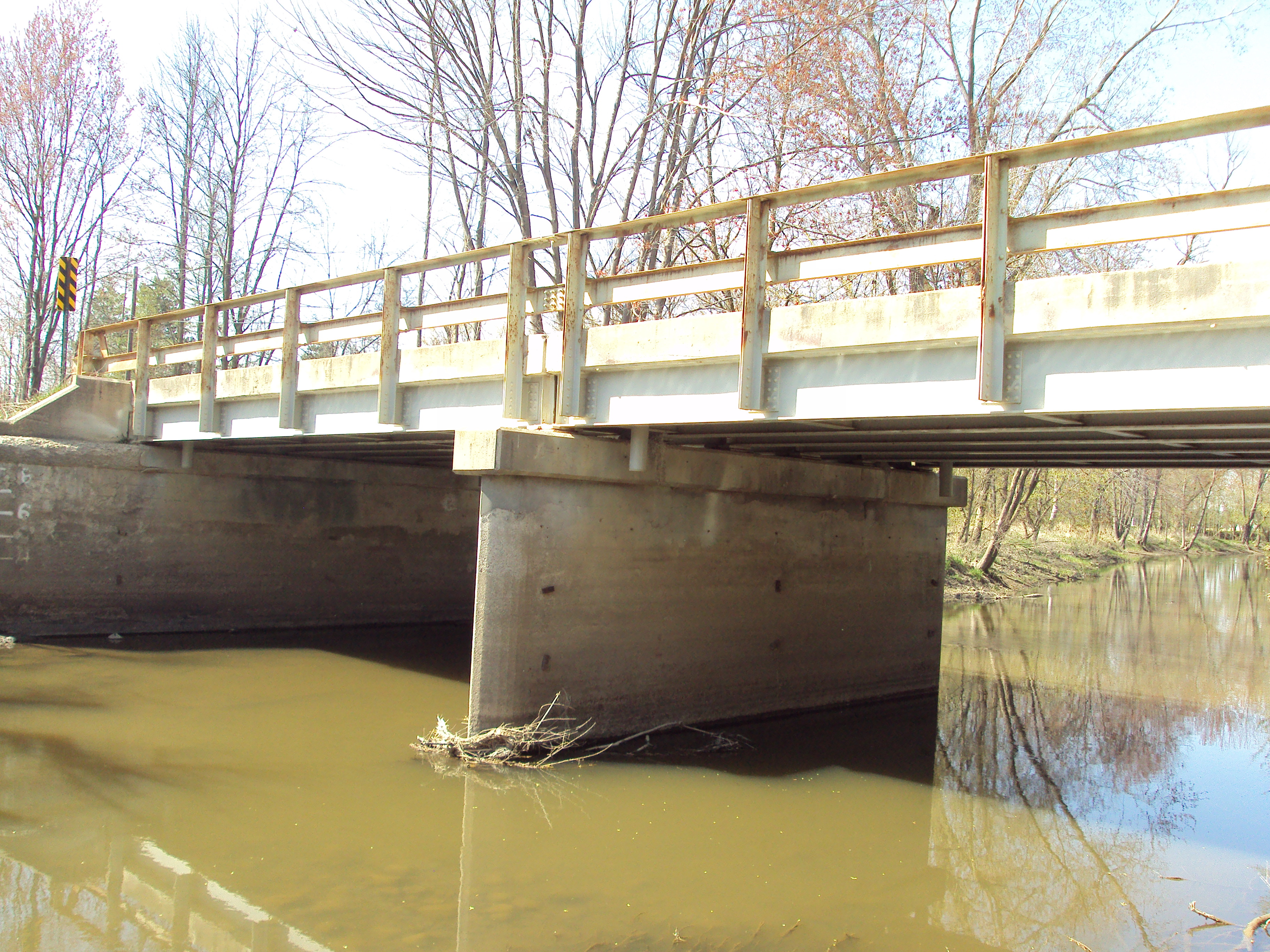

- Location within Michigan Location within the United States
- Interactive map
- Location: Jeddo Rd. over S. Branch Mill Creek Drain, Brockway Township, Michigan
- Coordinates: 43°8′36″N 82°50′13″W
- Area: less than one acre
- Built: 1939
- Built by: Marshall Campbell
- Architect: St. Clair County Road Commission
- Architectural style: Steel I-beam Stringer
- MPS: Highway Bridges of Michigan MPS
- NRHP reference No.: 00000013
- Added to NRHP: January 28, 2000

The Jeddo Road–South Branch Mill Creek Drain Bridge is a bridge carrying Jeddo Road over the south branch of the Mill Creek Drain in Brockway Township, Michigan. It was listed on the National Register of Historic Places in 2000.

== History ==
In 1939, the St. Clair County Road Commission decided to replace on old bridge located at this site, which was deemed too narrow (having a 12-foot roadway) and with too little carrying capacity. Ben L. Parker, on the Commission staff, designed this bridge. A contract to construct it, for $9855, was awarded to Marshall Campbell of Port Huron. The bridge was constructed that year.

The bridge was closed to traffic in 2016 due to the deterioration of concrete and steel reinforcement in the bridge deck. Funding is being sought for repair.

== Description ==
The Jeddo Road bridge is a two-span, steel-stringer bridge with a solid concrete pier located in the center of the stream below. Each span consists of six steel stringers braced with I-beams, with a maximum span length of 29 feet. The entire structure is 74 feet long and 23 feet wide, with a 20-foot-wide roadway edged by concrete curbs. The bridge is lined with metal railings built of an angle and a channel beam, connected to posts made from angles.
