= Chicago Drive Bridge =

Bridge in Wyoming, Michigan, US

- Business Route M-21–Plaster Creek Bridge
- U.S. National Register of Historic Places
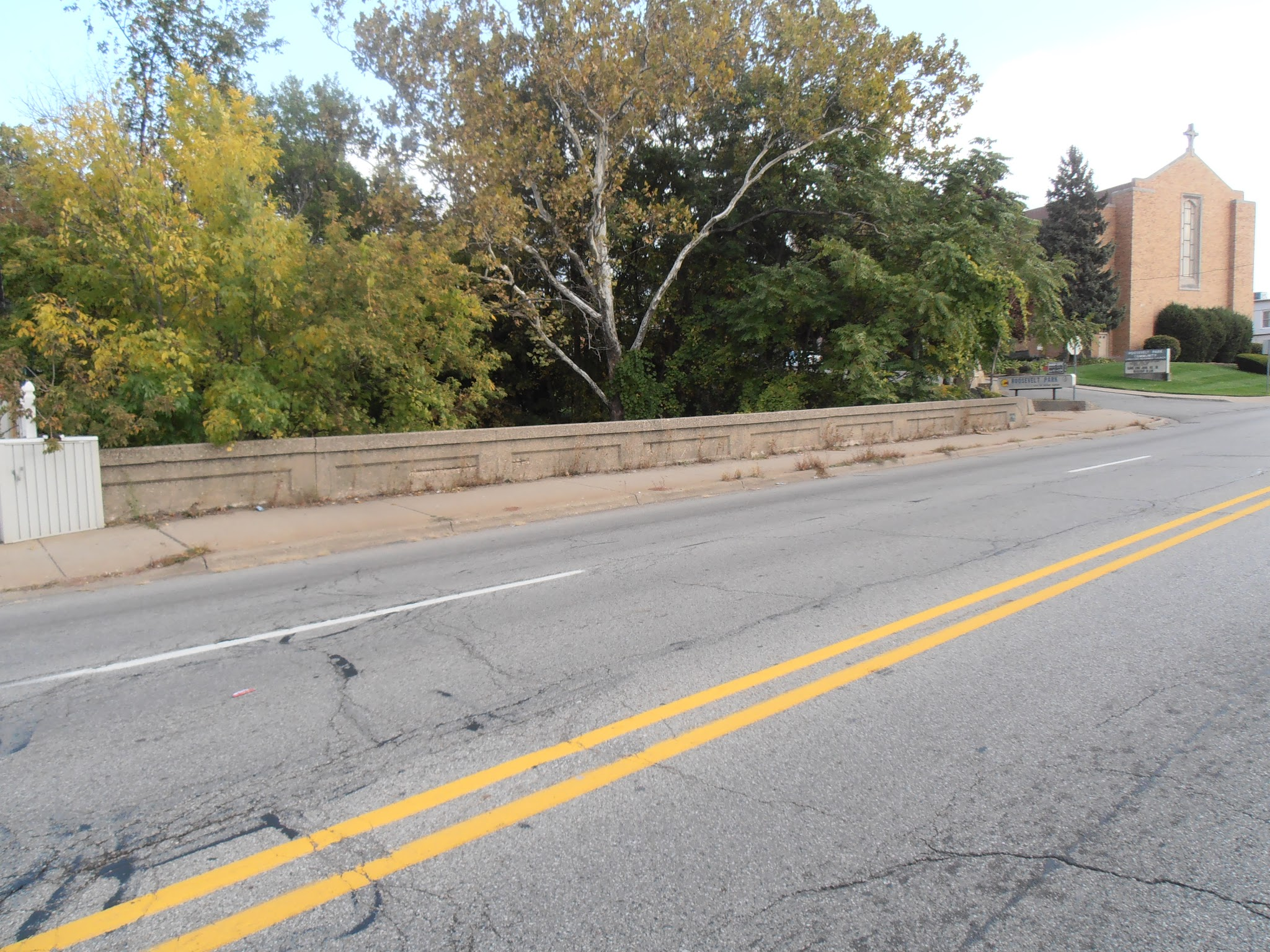

- Location within Michigan
- Interactive map
- Location: BS I-196 over Plaster Creek, Wyoming, Michigan
- Coordinates: 42°56′9″N 85°41′14″W
- Built: 1916
- Built by: Hilding & Rabe;
- Architect: Michigan State Highway Department
- Architectural style: concrete bridge
- MPS: Highway Bridges of Michigan MPS
- NRHP reference No.: 99001522
- Added to NRHP: December 17, 1999

The Chicago Drive Bridge, also known as the Business Route M-21–Plaster Creek Bridge, is a bridge in Wyoming, Michigan, carrying Business Spur I-196 (BS I-196) over Plaster Creek. It was listed on the National Register of Historic Places in 1999.

== History ==
In 1916, the Michigan State Highway Department designed what was then designated as Trunk line Bridge No. 58 to carry Chicago Drive (a state trunk line) over Plaster Creek. They hired Grand Rapids contractors Hilding and Rabe to construct the bridge at a cost of $13,146.55 (equivalent to $261,017 in 2024), which was shared with the Kent County Road Commission and the Grand Rapids Railway Company. The bridge was completed later that year, and until 1919 carried tracks for an interurban tram line. That year, the Grand Rapids Railway Company discontinued the line and removed the tracks. The bridge has served vehicular traffic since. The highway is part of Business Spur Interstate 196 (BS I-196).

== Description ==
The Chicago Drive Bridge is a 60-foot-long (18 m), filled spandrel arch bridge. Each end of the bridge has massive concrete abutments, with an elliptically shaped arch running between. The arch features a tapered arch ring cast integrally with the concrete spandrel walls. The bridge is topped with an asphalt roadway with concrete sidewalks on each side. The guardrails are made of solid concrete with recessed rectangular panels. Bronze plates inscribed with "Trunk Line Bridge" are mounted on the inside walls of the guardrails.
