= West Mitchell Street Bridge =

- U.S. National Register of Historic Places
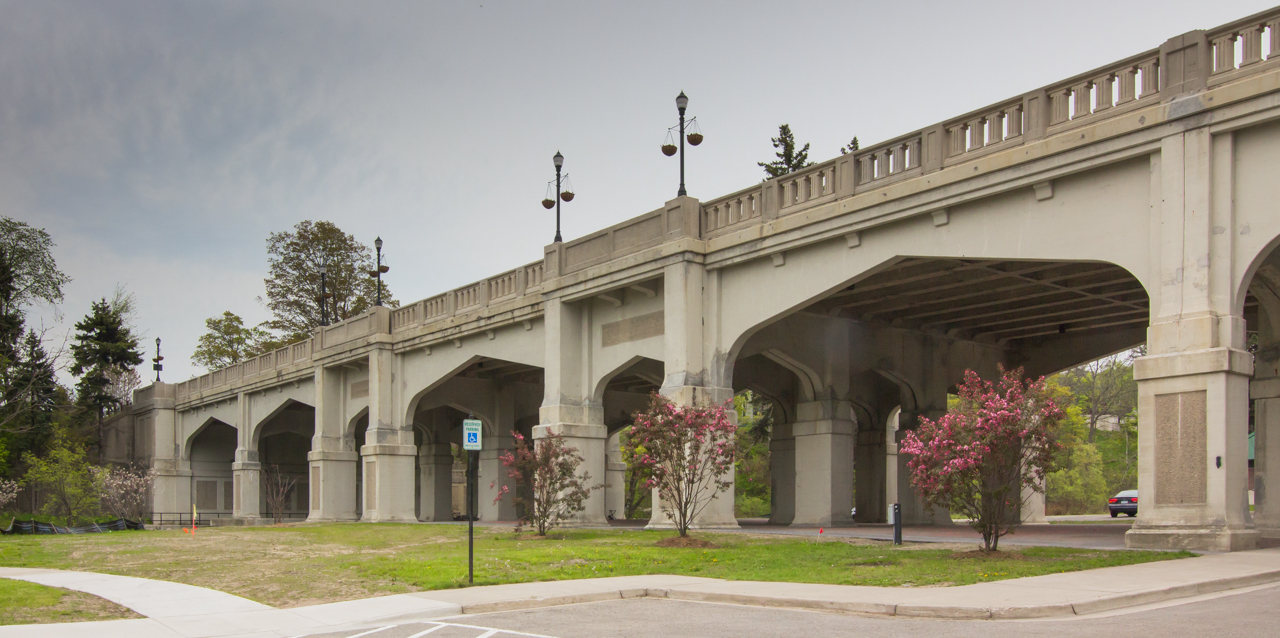

- Location within Michigan Location within the United States
- Interactive map
- Location: US 31 (W. Mitchell Street) at Bear River, Petoskey, Michigan
- Coordinates: 45°22′26″N 84°57′39″W
- Area: 0.5 acres (0.20 ha)
- Built: 1930
- Built by: Whitney Brothers
- Architect: Michigan State Highway Department
- Architectural style: Moderne
- MPS: Petoskey MRA
- NRHP reference No.: 86002085
- Added to NRHP: September 10, 1986

The West Mitchell Street Bridge is a bridge carrying West Mitchell Street and US Highway 31 (US 31) over the Bear River in Petoskey, Michigan. It was added to the National Register of Historic Places in 1986.

== History ==
The Michigan State Highway Department constructed this bridge in 1930 under the supervision of State Highway Commissioner Grover C. Dillman. The MSHD contracted with Whitney Brothers to build the bridge.

== Description ==
The West Mitchell Street Bridge is a seven-span highway T-beam bridge constructed of reinforced concrete, with broad ogee arches supporting each span. It is 330 feet (100 m) long and 60 feet (18 m) wide. The deck is asphalt, lined by sidewalks and side balustrades. The bridge is extensively detailed, with Moderne features.
