= M-88–Intermediate River Bridge =

- U.S. National Register of Historic Places
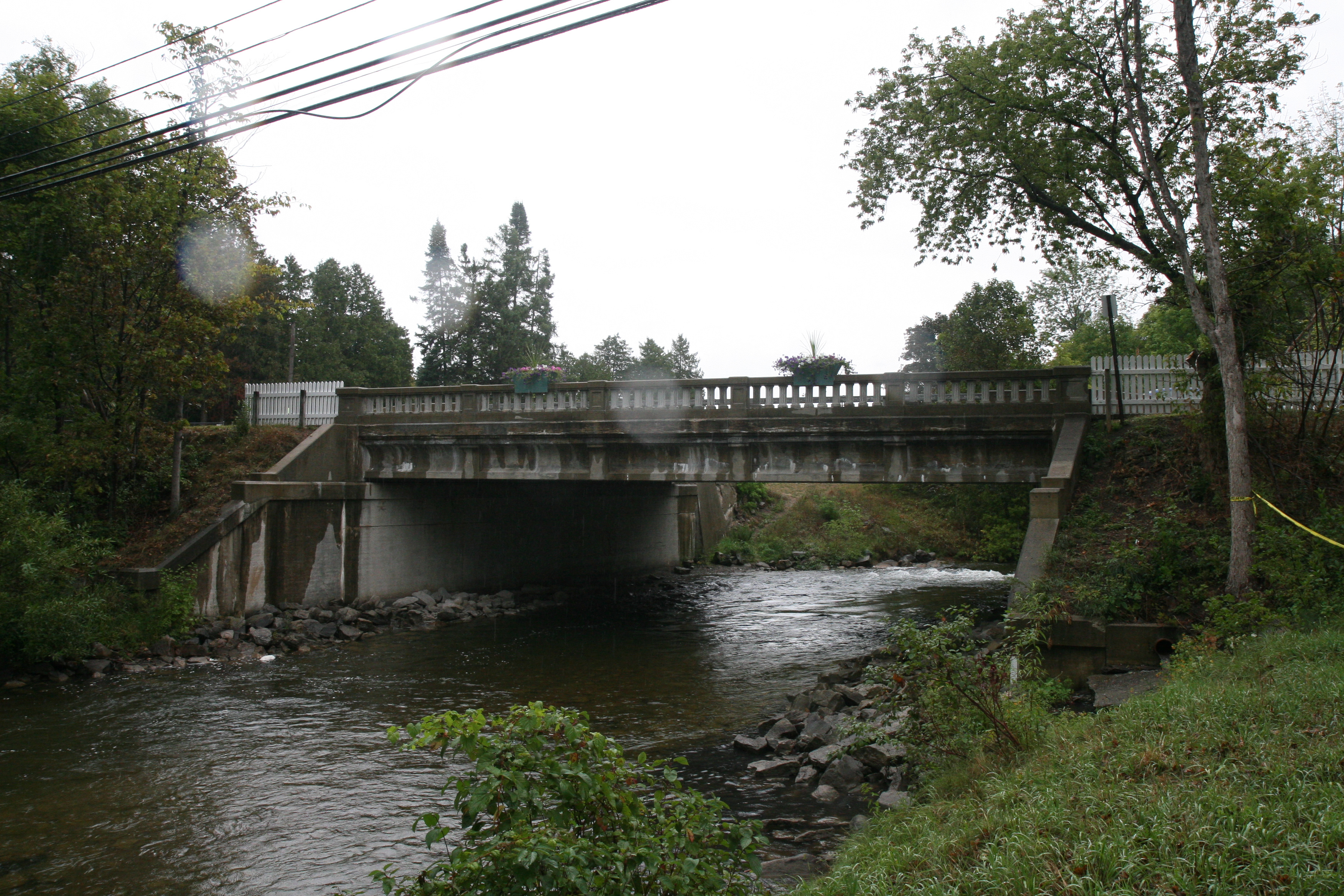

- Location within Michigan Location within the United States
- Interactive map
- Location: M-88 over Intermediate River, Bellaire, Michigan
- Coordinates: 44°58′43″N 85°12′36″W
- Area: less than one acre
- Built: 1930
- Built by: L. W. Lamb
- Architect: Michigan State Highway Department
- Architectural style: steel Stringer
- MPS: Highway Bridges of Michigan MPS
- NRHP reference No.: 99001574
- Added to NRHP: December 17, 1999

The M-88–Intermediate River Bridge is a bridge located on M-88 over the Intermediate River in Bellaire, Michigan, United States. It was listed on the National Register of Historic Places in 1999. It is a noteworthy product of Depression-era relief work.

== History ==
In 1893, a steel truss bridge was constructed to carry Bellaire's main north–south street over the Intermediate River. By 1931, with the tourism boom in northern Michigan, the bridge needed replacement. The Michigan State Highway Department drafted plans, and in late 1931 awarded Jackson contractor L. W. Lamb a $21,419 contract for the concrete construction. The Fort Pitt Bridge Works of Massillon, Ohio provided the structural steel. Work on the bridge began in late 1931, with many workers provided by the County Relief Committee. The bridge opened for traffic in June 1932. The original balusters have at some points been replaced with replicas.

== Description ==
The M-88–Intermediate River Bridge is 60 feet (18 m) long and 55.4 feet (16.9 m) wide, with a roadway width of 40 feet (12 m) and sidewalks lining both edges. It has concrete balustrade railings with square balusters and posts, and an ornamental railing on one wing wall to protect pedestrians from the steep drop. A bridge plate gives the construction date of 1931.
