= Gillespie Street-Clinton River Bridge =

- U.S. National Register of Historic Places
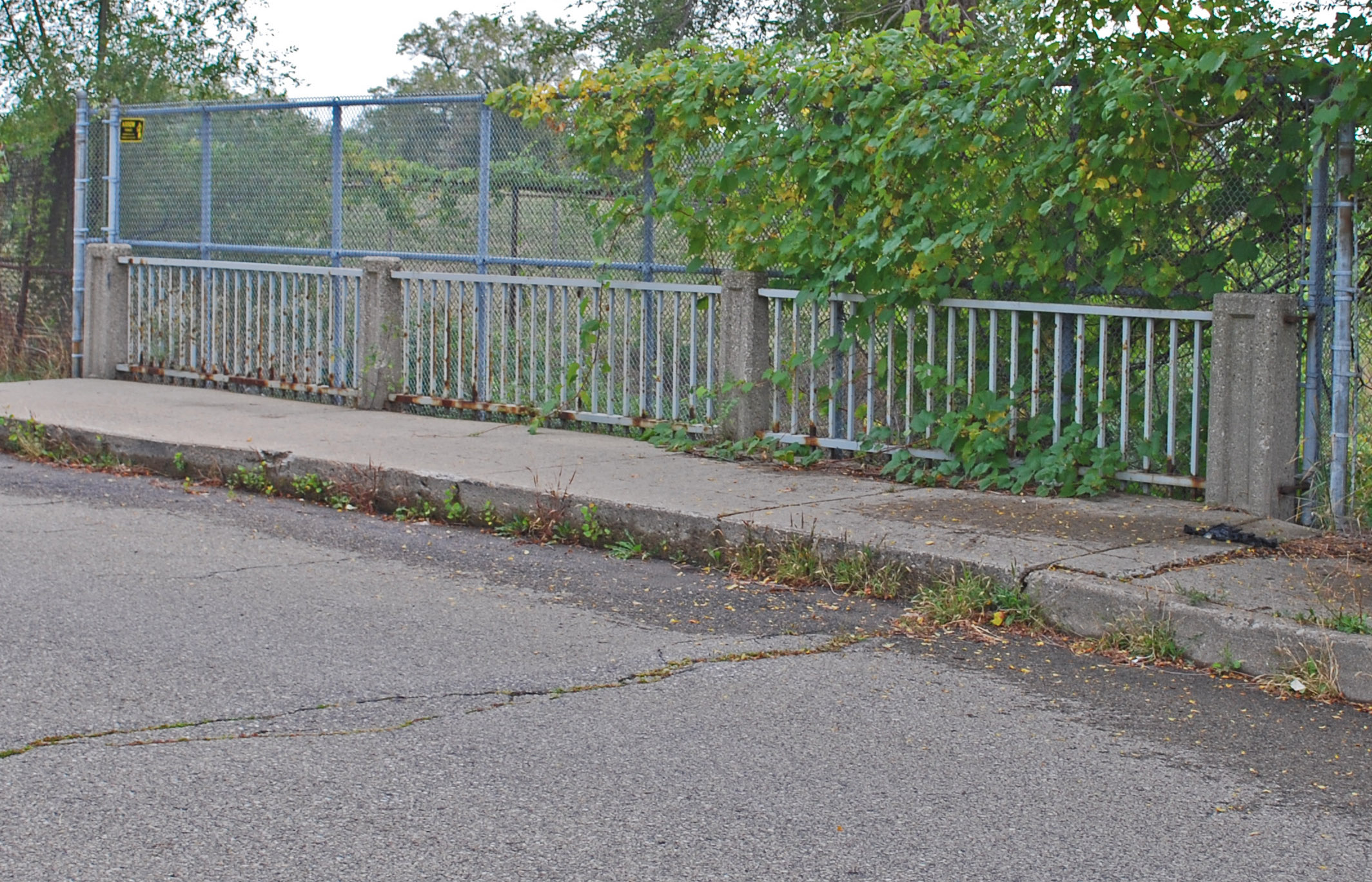
- Interactive map
- Location: Gillespie St. over Clinton R., Pontiac, Michigan
- Coordinates: 42°37′34″N 83°17′52″W
- Area: less than one acre
- Built: 1936
- Architect: Harold H. Corson
- Architectural style: Concrete Rigid Frame
- MPS: Highway Bridges of Michigan MPS
- NRHP reference No.: 99001729
- Added to NRHP: January 27, 2000

The Gillespie Street-Clinton River Bridge is a bridge carrying Gillespie Street over the Clinton River in Pontiac, Michigan. It is a relatively early example of a rigid-frame bridge in Michigan. The bridge was listed on the National Register of Historic Places in 2000.

== History ==
This bridge was apparently the first at this location. In 1936, the city of Pontiac deepened the Clinton River and extended Gillespie Street. They contracted with consulting engineer Harold Hawley Corson to design this bridge, who was serving as Birmingham's city engineer after a stint with the Michigan State Highway Department. Corson designed this rigid frame bridge, then a relatively new type of bridge which had been introduced in Michigan in the early 1930s.

== Description ==
The Gillespie Street bridge is a rigid-frame bridge with shallow spandrels ornamented with recessed panels. The bridge is 34 feet long, spanning a 33-foot-wide channel, and 50.5 feet wide. The railings are simple metal panels, ending in chain link fencing. The roadway is 36.5 feet wide, with sidewalks on each side.

== See also ==
- National Register of Historic Places listings in Oakland County, Michigan
