= Parke Lane Road–Thorofare Canal Bridge =

- U.S. National Register of Historic Places
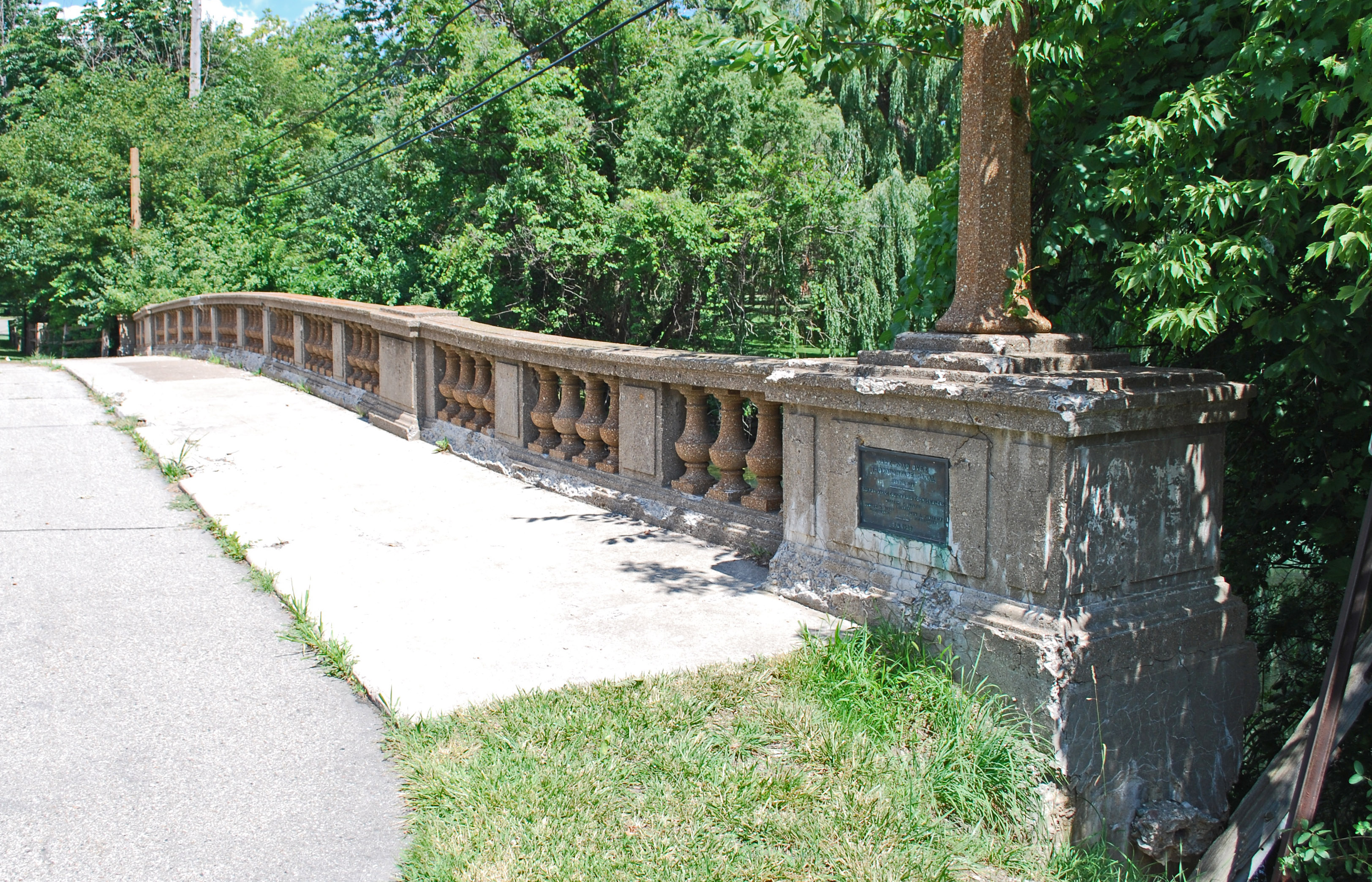
- East side of bridge

- Location within Michigan Location within the United States
- Interactive map
- Location: Parke Lane Rd. over Thorofare Ch., Grosse Ile, Michigan
- Coordinates: 42°10′5″N 83°8′38″W
- Area: less than one acre
- Built: 1929
- Built by: Gossner and Flynn
- Architect: Wayne County Road Commission
- Architectural style: concrete arch bridge
- MPS: Highway Bridges of Michigan MPS
- NRHP reference No.: 00000043
- Added to NRHP: February 4, 2000

The Parke Lane Road–Thorofare Canal Bridge is a bridge located on Parke Lane Road over the Thorofare Canal in Grosse Ile, Michigan. It was listed on the National Register of Historic Places in 2000.

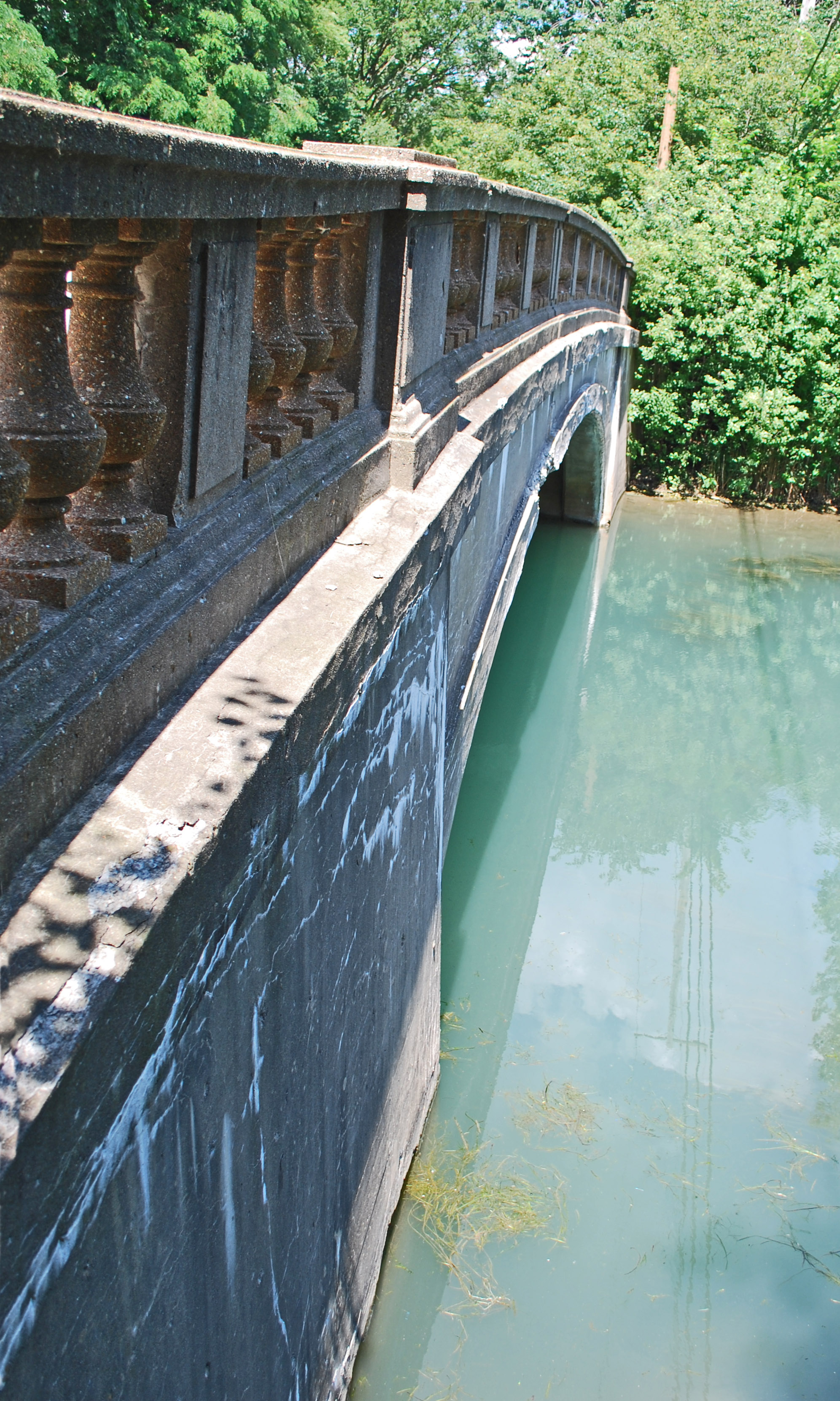
Side of bridge

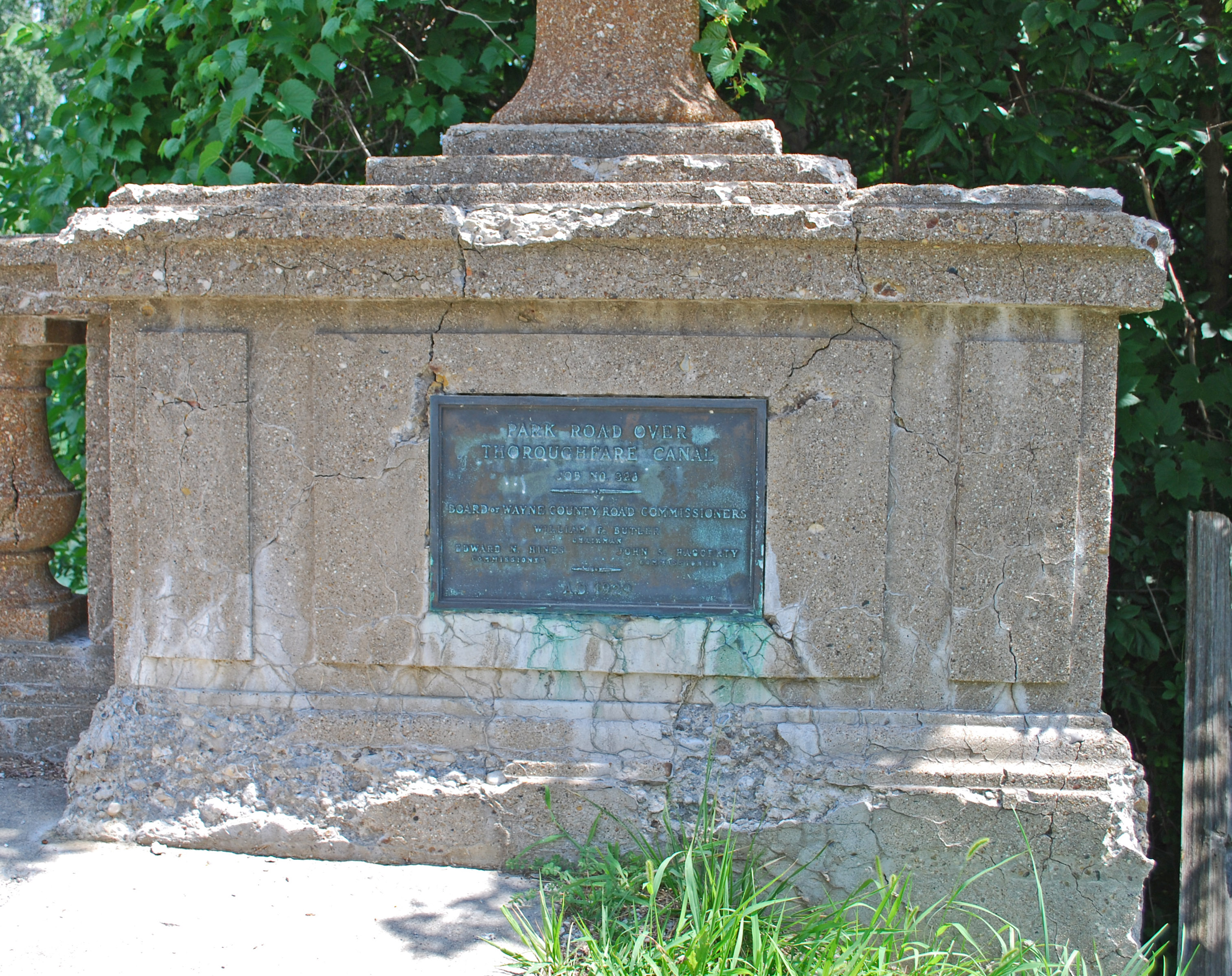
Plaque on bridge—Park Road is now Parke Lane

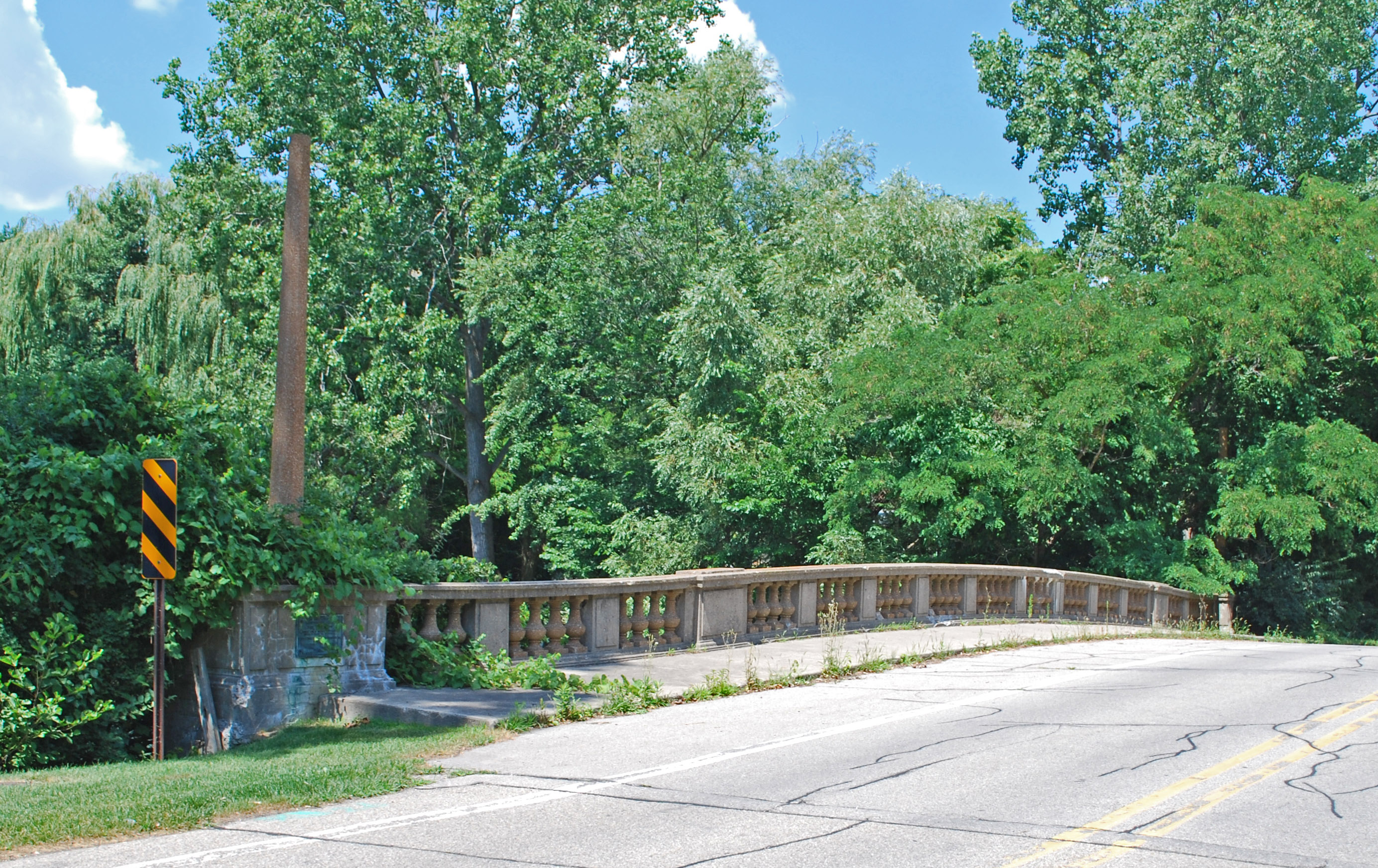
West railing on bridge

== History ==
Some time near the beginning of the twentieth century, Grosse Ile Township constructed a hand-operated swing bridge at the intersection of Park Road (now Parke Lane) with the Thorofare Canal. However, by 1929, the old bridge was deteriorating and the increasing volume of traffic and weight of vehicles had rendered the lightweight swing bridge obsolete. In 1929/1930, the Wayne County Road Commission replaced the old bridge with a concrete cantilevered-arch span.

The bridge was eventually heavily damaged and closed.

== Description ==
The Parke Lane Road–Thorofare Canal Bridge is 99 feet long, with a span length of 51 feet and a width of 36 feet. The bridge itself is of a rare cantilevered concrete arch design. The traditional arch bridge design requires a complete arch; in contrast, the cantilevered arch design is divided into two structurally independent half-arches which are each cantilevered from one side. A slab is suspended between the two cantilevered sections; in the Parke Lane Road–Thorofare Canal Bridge, this section is 18 feet long. Close inspection of the sidewalls of the bridge reveals two seams marking the end of the cantilevered arms.

A concrete balustrade with urn-shaped spindles runs along each side of the roadway, terminating at each end in an octagonal lamp stand. Orange pebble aggregate is included in the spindle concrete mix for color and texture.

== Significance ==
This bridge is significant as a product of the Wayne County Road Commission's bridge engineers because of its aesthetically pleasing design matched to the surroundings and as a representative of the unusual concrete cantilevered-arch construction.
