= Stony Creek Bridge =

- U.S. National Register of Historic Places
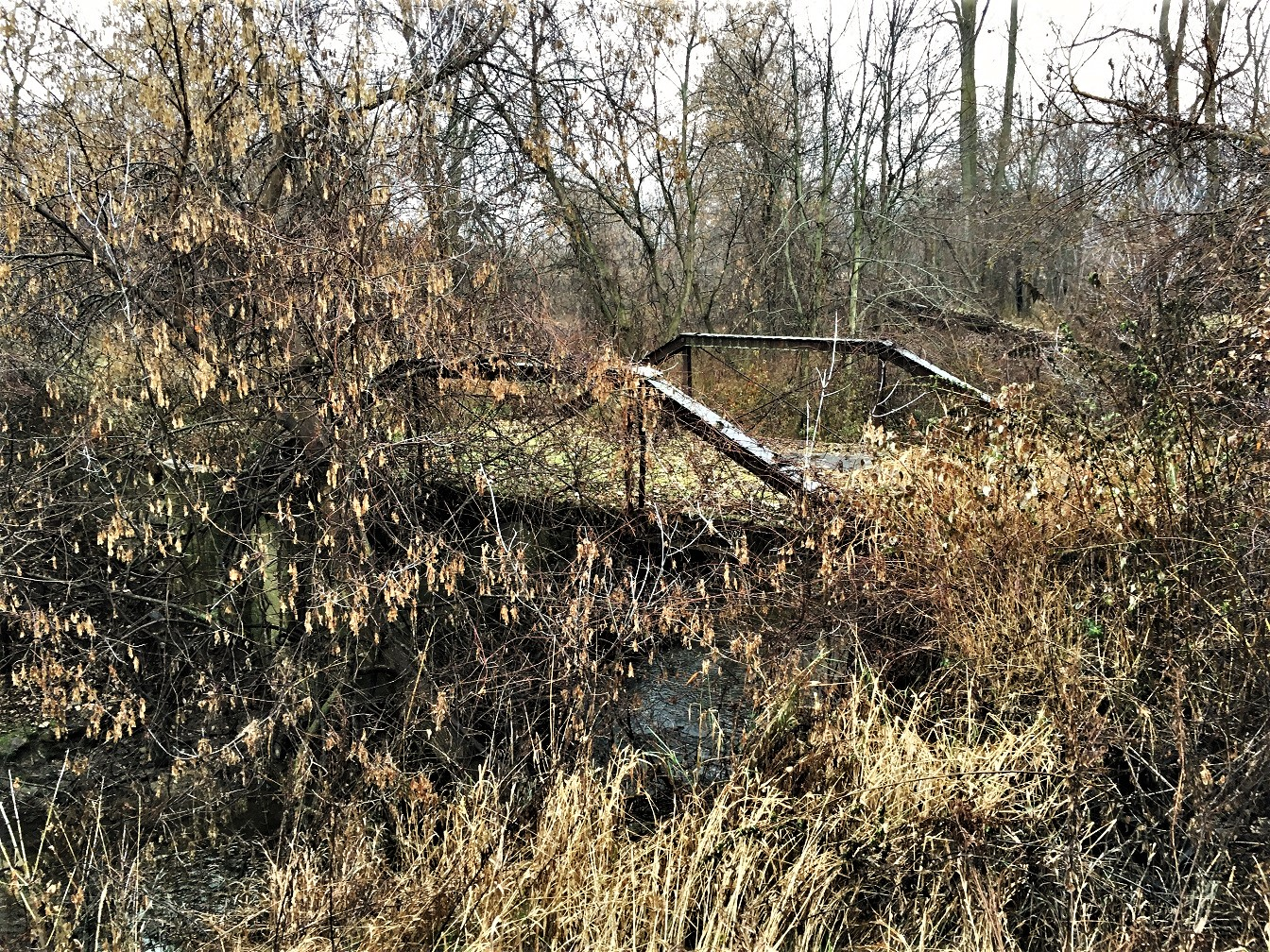

- Location within Michigan Location within the United States
- Interactive map
- Location: Private road over Stony Creek, Olive Township, Clinton County, Michigan
- Coordinates: 42°54′54″N 84°34′48″W
- Area: less than one acre
- Built: 1880
- Architectural style: Queen post pony truss bridge
- MPS: Highway Bridges of Michigan MPS
- NRHP reference No.: 99001467
- Added to NRHP: November 30, 1999

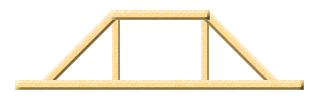
Queen post truss

The Stony Creek Bridge is a bridge located on a private road over Stony Creek in Olive Township, Clinton County, Michigan. It was listed on the National Register of Historic Places in 1999. It is the last example of a queen post truss bridge extant in Michigan.

== History ==
The Stony Creek Bridge was constructed in 1880 to carry what is now Dewitt Road over Stony Creek. At some point, Dewitt Road was re-aligned and a concrete culvert was constructed to direct the creek under the road. This bridge was turned over to a private owner.

== Queen post truss bridge ==
A queen post bridge has two upright queen posts on either side, each placed about one-third of the way along the span, connected across the top by a beam. (In comparison, each side of a king post bridge has a single king post in the center of the span.) A diagonal brace runs between the top of the queen post and the outer edge. Queen post bridges can span greater distances than single-upright king post bridges.

The queen post truss bridge is of ancient origin, and both king post and queen post trusses were constructed from timber from the Middle Ages through early American history, and used for roof trusses and bridges. The technology spread through the United States with the pioneers, and uncounted numbers of timber king- and queen post bridges were constructed throughout Michigan in the 18th and 19th centuries. As the 19th century progressed, the basic engineering form of the bridge remained constant, but the materials used evolved from timber to timber/iron combinations to iron and steel. Iron and steel versions of the bridge were marketed to local governments by bridge fabricators as low-cost durable structures for spanning short distances.

However, the span range of queen post trusses was fairly narrow, with king posts being used for shorter spans and the upper limit of a queen post span being not much longer. After the turn of the 20th century, steel beam bridges became more common, and metal Pratt truss bridges superseded the queen post. With no new queen post bridges being built in Michigan, attrition eliminated all but this single example.

== Description ==
The Stony Creek Bridge is a wrought iron pin-connected queen post pony truss bridge measuring 40 feet (12 m) long and 16 feet (4.9 m) wide, with a road width of 14 feet (4.3 m). It is a single span sitting on concrete abutments with stone masonry wingwalls. The bridge is constructed using double channels for the upper beam and inclined end posts, and two punched rectangular I-bars for the lower beam and queen posts. A diagonal brace on each side is constructed from a round eyerod with a turnbuckle. The timber decking is supported by I-beams hung from the lower truss beam by U-bolts and support steel stringers.
