= Center Road – Tittabawassee River Bridge =

- U.S. National Register of Historic Places
- Interactive map
- Location: Center Rd. over Tittabawassee River, James Township, Michigan
- Coordinates: 43°23′37″N 84°00′54″W
- Area: less than one acre
- Built: 1927
- Built by: Willits Brothers Construction Co.
- Architect: Michigan State Highway Department
- Architectural style: Steel Stringer Bridge
- Demolished: November 2009
- MPS: Highway Bridges of Michigan MPS
- NRHP reference No.: 99001458
- Added to NRHP: November 30, 1999

The Center Road – Tittabawassee River Bridge was a bridge carrying Center Road over the Tittabawassee River in James Township, Michigan. It was listed on the National Register of Historic Places in 1999.

== History ==
In 1926, the Michigan State Highway Department designed this bridge located on the Tittabawassee River. The department contracted with Willits Brothers Construction Co. of Bay City. Willits completed the bridge in 1927, using a steel superstructure constructed by the American Bridge Company. The bridge functioned in place until the 21st century. Although the bridge was still functional, the bridge was demolished in November 2009.

== Description ==
The Center Road Bridge was a multiple-span bridge constructed of concrete and steel. The bridge had five steel stringer spans, each 65 feet long. Each span contained nine lines of rolled I-beams supported by concrete abutments and piers. The outside webs of the spandrel stringers were encased in concrete. Atop the stringers was a concrete deck with standard concrete guardrails on each side, having classical fluted balusters and paneled bulkheads.
