= Gugel Bridge =

- U.S. National Register of Historic Places
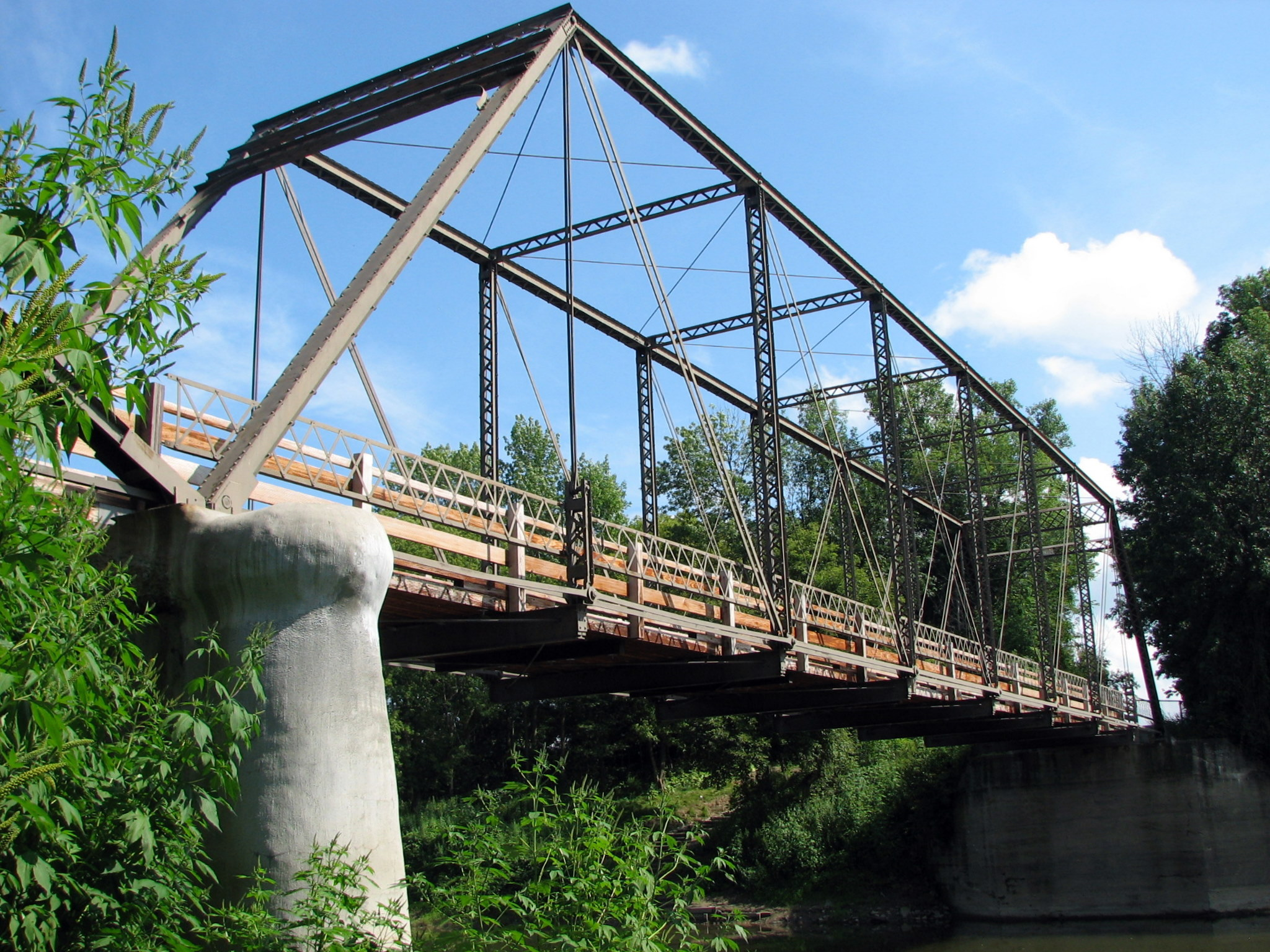
- Interactive map
- Location: Beyer Rd. at the Cass R, Frankenmuth Township, Michigan
- Coordinates: 43°19′44″N 83°46′35″W
- Area: less than one acre
- Built: 1904
- Built by: Joliet Bridge and Iron Co.
- Architectural style: Pratt through truss bridge
- NRHP reference No.: 00000217
- Added to NRHP: March 15, 2000

The Gugel Bridge, also known as the Beyer Road – Cass River Bridge, is a bridge carrying Beyer Road over the Cass River in Frankenmuth Township, Michigan. It was listed on the National Register of Historic Places in 2000. It is the only remaining example in Michigan of a bridge with both a pony truss span and a main through truss span.

== History ==
This bridge was originally located where Dixie Highway crosses the Cass River, about two miles west of the present location. This section of Dixie Highway was originally established as a turnpike in the 1830s, and the first bridge over the Cass River was constructed at that time. The first bridge was replaced by a second in 1847. It is likely that other replacement bridges were constructed in subsequent decades, but there is no record of either construction materials or construction dates. In 1904, however, the Bridgeport Township Board proposed to replace the bridge existing at that time with an iron bridge designed by the Joliet Bridge and Iron Company to do so. Township voters approved, and the township contracted Joliet to construct the bridge. Construction began almost immediately, and the bridge was likely in place in late 1904 or early 1905.

Dixie Highway was a state trunkline, and with the explosion of automobile traffic at the beginning of the 20th century, the Cass River bridge soon became outmoded. In 1919/20 the State of Michigan replaced it with a larger truss bridge (which was in turn replaced in 1931). The 1904 bridge was moved to its current location at the Beyer Road crossing of the Cass River. It seems likely that there was no previous bridge at this location, and it appears that the section of Beyer Road near the bridge location was constructed at the same time. The bridge acquired the name of Christian Gugel, who was Frankenmuth Township Supervisor and a member of the Saginaw County Board of Supervisors at the time. The new section of Beyer Road ran at least partially through his property.

The bridge remained open to traffic until 1976, when it was closed. The deck subsequently deteriorated. However, resident William "Tiny" Zehnder Jr. led an effort to rehabilitate the bridge, and in 2004 it was completely renovated and reopened to foot traffic.

== Description ==
The Gugel Bridge is a two span Pratt truss bridge, with a Pratt through truss span of 144 feet and a Pratt pony truss span of 60 feet, for a total bridge length of 204 feet. The through truss span sits on a concrete abutment on the south side of the river and a concrete pier near the north side of the river. The pony truss extends from the concrete pier to a concrete abutment on the north shore of the river. The bridge is located about fifteen feet above the river's surface.

The truss structure is 17 feet wide, with a vertical clearance of about 20 feet. The main truss structure contains eight panels separated by vertical posts made from two parallel channels with crossed-bracing connecting them. The upper chords of the span are made from two channels covered with plating. The understructure supporting the deck is made of large I-beams between the vertical posts with smaller length-wise steel stringers under the deck. Lattice guard rails are on each side of the main through truss, but are not present on the pony truss. A plaque on each end gives the date of construction: 1904.
