= Gibraltar Road–Waterway Canal Bridge =

- U.S. National Register of Historic Places
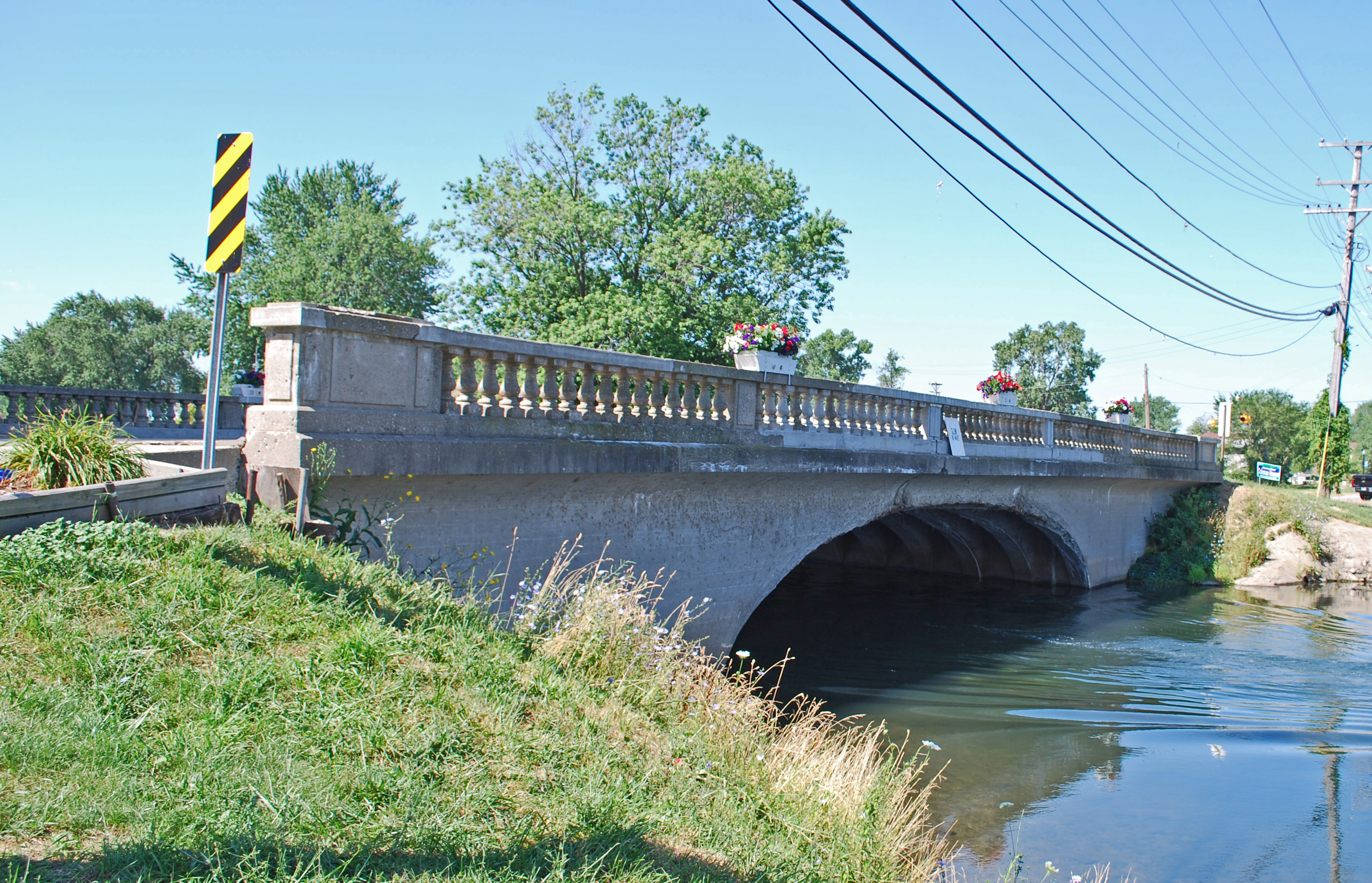

- Location within Michigan Location within the United States
- Interactive map
- Location: Gibraltar Road over Waterway Canal, Gibraltar, Michigan
- Coordinates: 42°5′42″N 83°11′26″W
- Area: 0.9 acres (0.36 ha)
- Built: 1932
- Architect: Wayne County Road Commission
- Architectural style: T-beam bridge
- MPS: Highway Bridges of Michigan MPS
- NRHP reference No.: 00000082
- Added to NRHP: February 10, 2000

The Gibraltar Road–Waterway Canal Bridge is a bridge located on Gibraltar Road over the Waterway Canal in Gibraltar, Michigan. It was listed on the National Register of Historic Places in 2000.

== History ==
The Wayne County Road Commission paved a section of Gibraltar Road in the early 1930s, and constructed a number of new bridges, including this one, during the project.

== Description ==
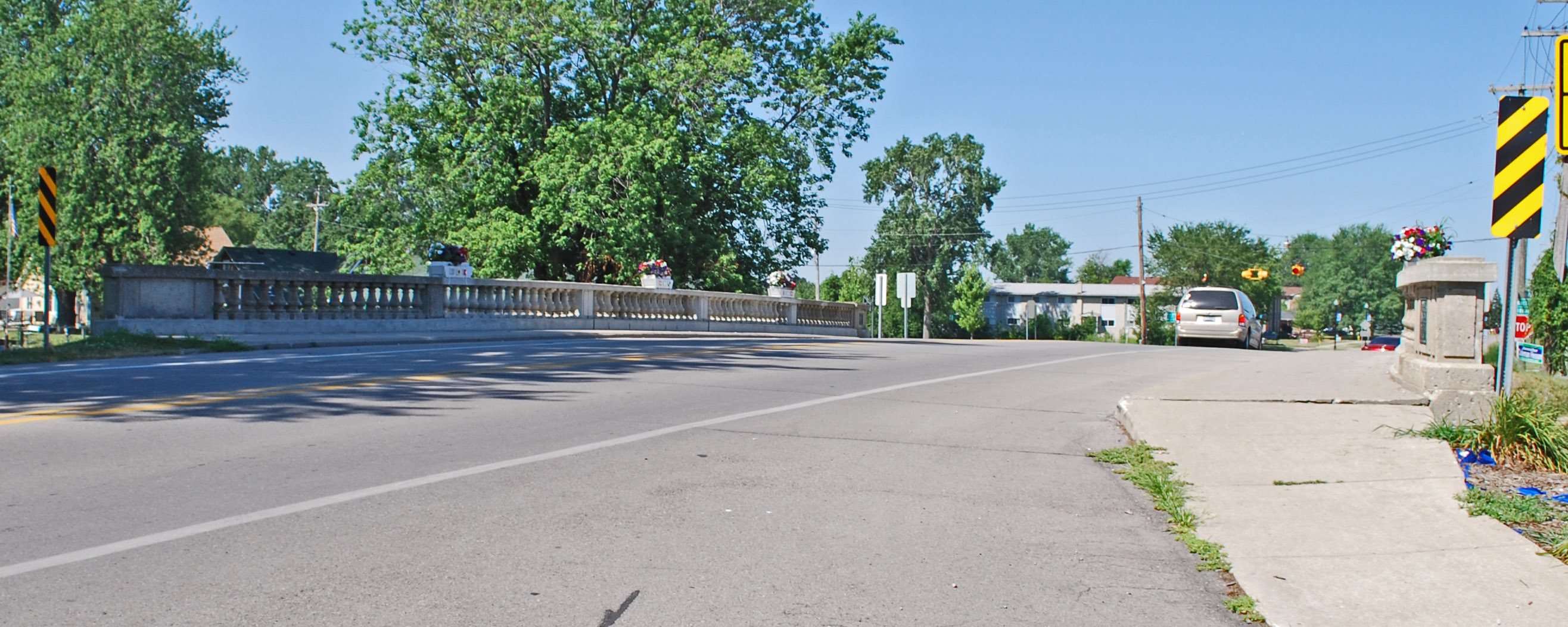
Bridge deck

The Gibraltar Road Bridge is a reinforced-concrete cantilevered-arch bridge measuring 98 feet (30 m) long and 38 feet (12 m) wide, with a span length of 52 feet (16 m) and a roadway width of 53 feet (16 m). A concrete balustrade with urn-shaped spindles flanks the roadway.

The bridge itself is of a rare cantilevered concrete arch design. The traditional arch bridge design requires a complete arch; in contrast, the cantilevered arch design is divided into two structurally independent half-arches which are each cantilevered from one side. A slab is suspended between the two cantilevered sections; in the Gibraltar Road Bridge, this section is 9 feet long. Close inspection of side walls of the bridge reveals two seams marking the end of the cantilevered arms.

After construction, the Wayne County Road Commissioners noted that "this low sweeping arch bridge is in keeping with its surroundings and is one of the features which make Gibraltar Road so attractive."
