= Mower Road – Cole Drain Bridge =

- U.S. National Register of Historic Places
- Interactive map
- Location: Mower Rd. over Cole Drain, Spaulding Township, Michigan
- Coordinates: 43°19′38″N 83°58′07″W
- Area: less than one acre
- Built: 1920
- Built by: Denton and Johnson
- Architect: Michigan State Highway Department
- Architectural style: through girder
- MPS: Highway Bridges of Michigan MPS
- NRHP reference No.: 99001537
- Added to NRHP: December 17, 1999

The Mower Road – Cole Drain Bridge is a bridge carrying Mower Road over the Cole Drain in Spaulding Township, Michigan. It was listed on the National Register of Historic Places in 1999. It is likely the longest straight chord through girder still extant on public roads.

== History ==
The Mower Road – Cole Drain Bridge was designed by the Michigan State Highway Department in 1920. The department contracted with Denton and Johnson of Saginaw, who constructed it that year. The bridge has stayed in service until the present.

== Description ==
The Mower Road – Cole Drain Bridge is a three-span concrete structure, consisting of three concrete through girder spans. The spans are supported by concrete abutments and piers with bullnosed cutwaters. The bridge contains straight 45-foot girders, which form the guardrails on either side of the concrete slab deck. Rectangular recessed panels on the exterior of the girders provide a minimal decoration. Bronze "State Reward Bridge" plates are attached to each girder.
