= Denton Road-Sparks Foundation Park Pond Bridge =

- U.S. National Register of Historic Places
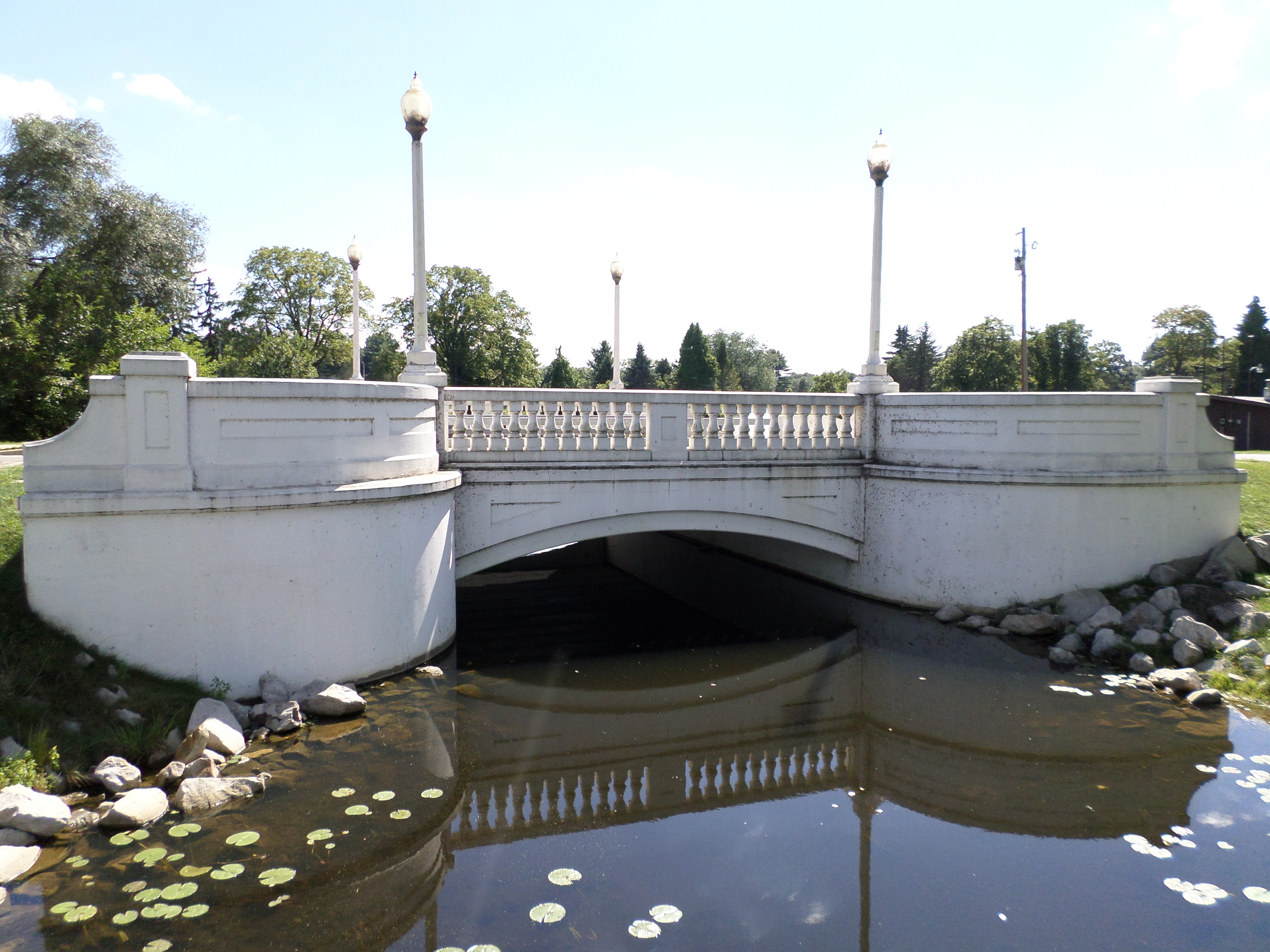
- The replacement 2007 bridge, visually similar to the original
- Interactive map
- Location: Denton Rd. over Sparks Foundation Park Pond, Jackson, Michigan
- Coordinates: 42°13′38″N 84°25′55″W
- Area: less than one acre
- Built: 1931
- Architect: Michigan State Highway Department
- Architectural style: Steel I-Beam Stringer
- Demolished: 2007
- MPS: Highway Bridges of Michigan MPS
- NRHP reference No.: 99001676
- Added to NRHP: January 28, 2000

The Denton Road-Sparks Foundation Park Pond Bridge is a road bridge carrying Denton Road over the Sparks Foundation Park pond in Jackson, Michigan. The original bridge, constructed c. 1931, was listed on the National Register of Historic Places in 2000. This bridge was demolished and replaced in 2007.

== History ==
William Sparks and his wife Matilda formed the William and Matilda Sparks Foundation, with the purpose of developing a recreation area near their home in Jackson. The park was developed in 1931, and included a large fountain as a central attraction. At about the same time, Michigan State Highway Department designed an ornamental bridge to carry visitors from the south side of Jackson into the park. The bridge design complemented the surrounding structures in the park. In 1944, the park was turned over to the county. The bridge remained in use until 2007, when it was demolished and replaced with a similar structure.

== Description ==
The historic Denton Road bridge was a single steel I-beam stringer with arched concrete fascia. The bridge was 23 feet long and 32 feet wide, with a 23.2-foot roadway. flanked by sidewalks. It had concrete balustrade railings on each side with integrated posts at the corners. Wingwall railings curved away from the main bridge, and ornamented light standards were located on each end post. The bases of the light standards contained an incised Westinghouse logo.

The replacement bridge is visually similar, but is a box beam bridge.
