= South Pointe Drive–Frenchman's Creek Bridge =

- U.S. National Register of Historic Places
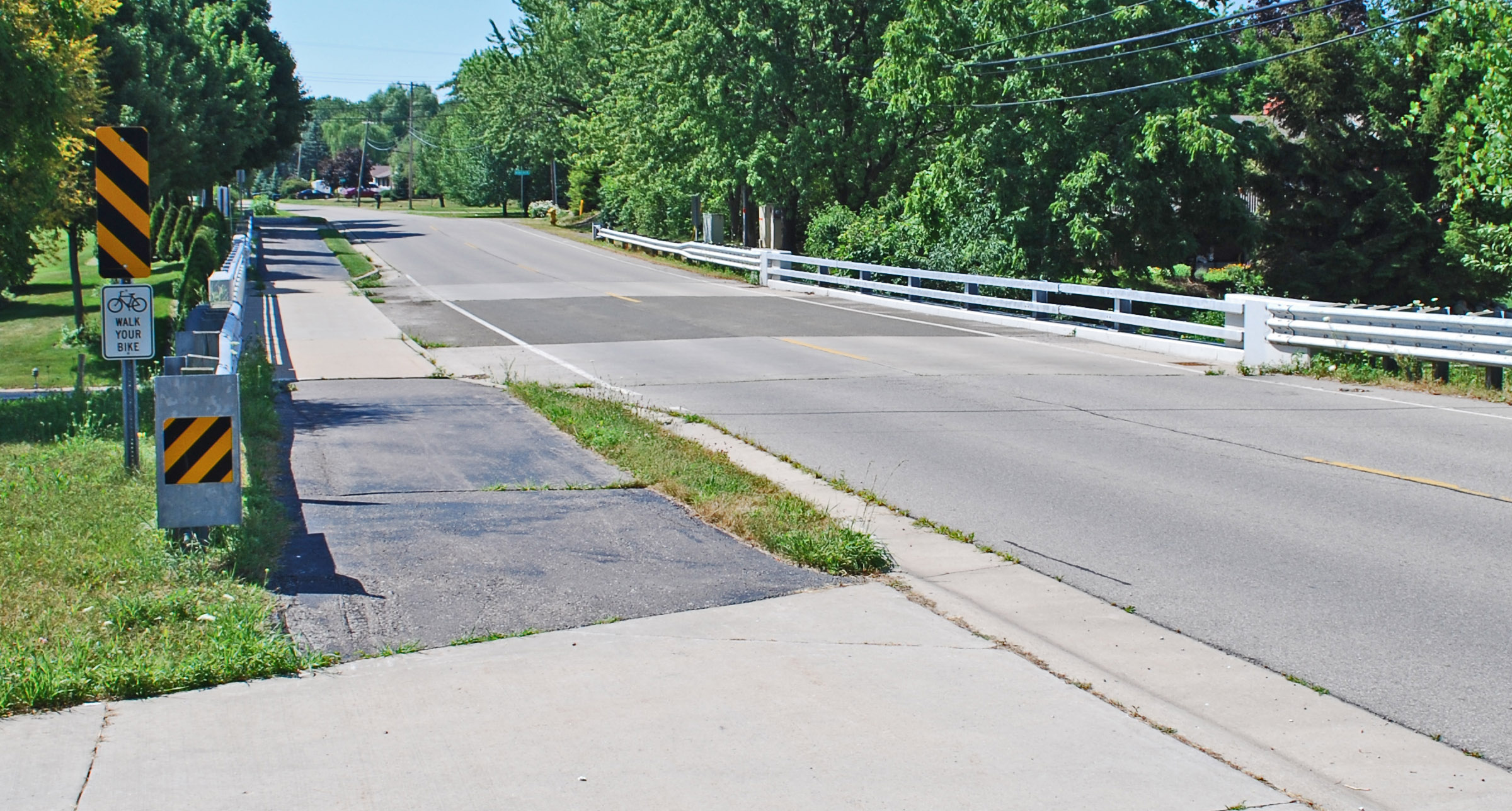

- Location within Michigan Location within the United States
- Interactive map
- Location: South Pointe Dr. over Frenchman's Creek, Grosse Ile, Michigan
- Coordinates: 42°6′9″N 83°10′20″W
- Area: 0.9 acres (0.36 ha)
- Built: 1939
- Architect: Wayne County Road Commission
- Architectural style: T-beam
- MPS: Highway Bridges of Michigan MPS
- NRHP reference No.: 00000117
- Added to NRHP: February 18, 2000

The South Pointe Drive–Frenchman's Creek Bridge is a bridge located on South Pointe Drive over Frenchman's Creek in Grosse Ile, Michigan. It was listed on the National Register of Historic Places in 2000.

== History ==
In the mid-1930s, the Wayne County Road Commission took ownership of a timber trestle bridge spanning Frenchman's Creek. The commission planned to replace the deck planking of the bridge, but a preliminary inspection showed that the entire structure was substantially weakened due to dry rot, and an immediate replacement was required. Being short of funds, the road commission tapped the labor force of the Works Progress Administration.

The bridge designed is a concrete T-beam with 40-foot span. Wood forms from another WPA project were used to shape the deck, and the construction of the new bridge was completed in 1939. The original bridge had a decorative balustrade along each side.
