= Bates Township, Michigan =

- Civil township
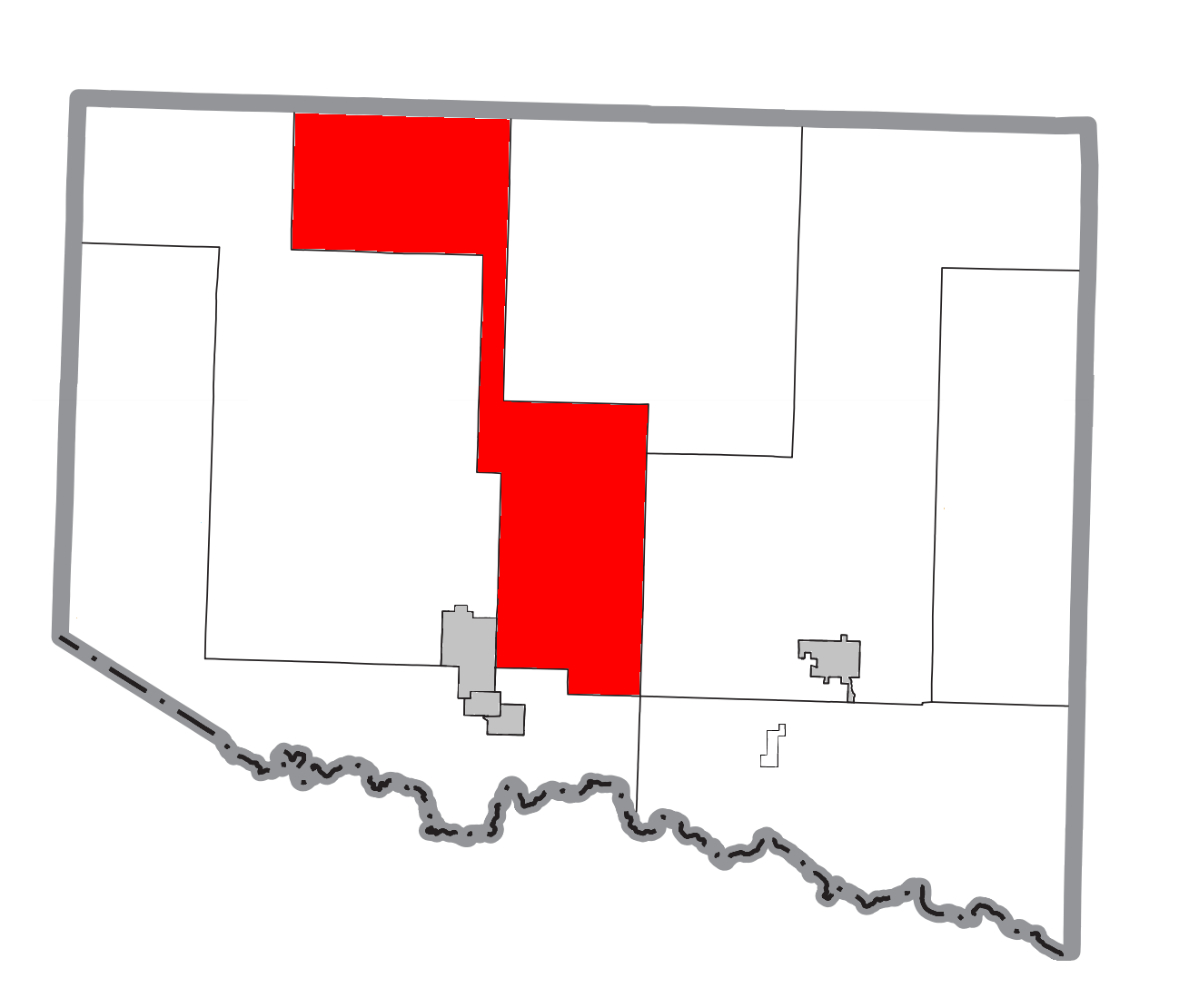
- Location within Iron County

- Location within the state of Michigan
- Coordinates: 46°16′20″N 88°38′11″W
- Country: United States
- State: Michigan
- County: Iron

Area
  - Total: 131.3 sq mi (340.1 km^{2})
  - Land: 125.4 sq mi (324.8 km^{2})
  - Water: 5.9 sq mi (15.3 km^{2})
- Elevation: 1,512 ft (461 m)

Population (2020)
  - Total: 925
  - Density: 8.0/sq mi (3.1/km^{2})
- Time zone: UTC-6 (Central (CST))
  - Summer (DST): UTC-5 (CDT)
- FIPS code: 26-05860
- GNIS feature ID: 1625888
- Website: https://www.batestownship.com/

Bates Township is a civil township of Iron County in the U.S. state of Michigan. As of the 2000 census, the township population was 1,021, though in 2020 its population was 925.

== Geography ==
According to the United States Census Bureau, the township has a total area of 131.3 square miles (340 km^{2}), of which 125.4 square miles (325 km^{2}) is land and 5.9 square miles (15 km^{2}) (4.49%) is water.
