= National Register of Historic Places listings in Saginaw County, Michigan =

Location of Saginaw County in Michigan

This is a list of the National Register of Historic Places listings in Saginaw County, Michigan.

This is intended to be a complete list of the properties and districts on the National Register of Historic Places in Saginaw County, Michigan, United States. Latitude and longitude coordinates are provided for many National Register properties and districts; these locations may be seen together in a map.

There are 41 properties and districts listed on the National Register in the county.

This National Park Service list is complete through NPS recent listings posted May 1, 2026.

== Current listings ==
	Name on the Register	Image	Date listed	Location	City or town	Description
1	Bearinger Building	Bearinger Building	July 9, 1982 (#82002861)	124 N. Franklin St. 43°26′02″N 83°56′14″W	Saginaw	
2	Bliss Park	Bliss Park	December 7, 1995 (#95001424)	SW of jct. of Houghton St. and N. Michigan Ave. 43°25′42″N 83°57′13″W	Saginaw	
3	Abel Brockway House	Abel Brockway House	July 9, 1982 (#82002862)	1631 Brockway St. 43°25′03″N 83°59′00″W	Saginaw	
4	Bugai Site (20SA215)		October 29, 1982 (#82000543)	Address Restricted; 43°20′00″N 83°51′30″W	Bridgeport	
5	Castle Station	Castle Station	January 13, 1972 (#72000652)	S. Jefferson at Federal St. 43°25′52″N 83°56′08″W	Saginaw	Now known as Castle Museum of Saginaw County History
6	Center Road – Tittabawassee River Bridge		November 30, 1999 (#99001458)	Center Rd. over Tittabawassee River; 43°23′37″N 84°00′54″W	James Township	Demolished in November 2009 and subsequently replaced.
7	Central Warehouse	Central Warehouse	July 9, 1982 (#82002864)	1800 N. Michigan Ave. 43°26′01″N 83°56′56″W	Saginaw	
8	Benjamin Cushway House	Benjamin Cushway House	July 9, 1982 (#82002865)	Rust Ave. and Fordney St. 43°24′38″N 83°57′40″W	Saginaw	At the time of National Register listing, the Cushway House was located at 1404 S. Fayette Street, 43.4096°N 83.9755°W. It was relocated to its current location in 2001.
9	Davis Carriage House	Davis Carriage House	July 9, 1982 (#82002863)	519 N. Fayette St. 43°25′17″N 83°57′40″W	Saginaw	
10	East Genesee Historic Business District	East Genesee Historic Business District	July 9, 1982 (#82002866)	Along E. Genesee Ave., bounded by Federal, Weadock, 2nd and Janes Sts. 43°25′49″N 83°55′58″W	Saginaw	
11	East Saginaw Historic Business District	East Saginaw Historic Business District	July 9, 1982 (#82002867)	Roughly bounded by Federal, N. Water, N. Washington and N. Franklin Sts. 43°26′00″N 83°56′20″W	Saginaw	
12	Flint and Pere Marquette Railroad East Saginaw Depot	Flint and Pere Marquette Railroad East Saginaw Depot	November 29, 1996 (#96001378)	501 Potter St. 43°26′27″N 83°55′59″W	Saginaw	
13	Fosters Site (20SA74)		October 29, 1982 (#82000544)	Address Restricted; 43°18′00″N 83°56′00″W	Fosters	
14	The Grove	The Grove	July 9, 1982 (#82002868)	S. Washington Ave. 43°24′58″N 83°57′04″W	Saginaw	
15	Gugel Bridge	Gugel Bridge	March 15, 2000 (#00000217)	Beyer Rd. at the Cass River; 43°19′45″N 83°46′35″W	Frankenmuth Township	
16	House at 1514 N. Michigan Street	House at 1514 N. Michigan Street	July 9, 1982 (#82002869)	1514 N. Michigan Ave. 43°25′47″N 83°57′02″W	Saginaw	House demolished in 2018.
17	Mahoney Site (20SA193)		October 29, 1982 (#82000545)	Address Restricted; 43°16′00″N 84°07′30″W	St. Charles	
18	Michigan Bell Building	Michigan Bell Building	July 9, 1982 (#82002870)	309 S. Washington Ave. 43°25′50″N 83°56′25″W	Saginaw	
19	Morseville Bridge		April 5, 1990 (#90000573)	Burt Rd. at Flint River; 43°14′12″N 83°52′06″W	Taymouth Township	
20	Mower Road – Cole Drain Bridge		December 17, 1999 (#99001537)	Mower Rd. over Cole Drain; 43°19′39″N 83°58′07″W	Spaulding Township	
21	North Jefferson Avenue Historic District		July 9, 1982 (#82002871)	Carroll and Jefferson Aves. 43°26′19″N 83°56′05″W	Saginaw	
22	North Michigan Avenue Historic District	North Michigan Avenue Historic District	July 9, 1982 (#82002872)	Roughly bounded by Monroe, Fayette, N. Hamilton and W. Remington Sts. 43°25′21″N 83°57′24″W	Saginaw	
23	Parshallburg Bridge	Parshallburg Bridge	October 12, 1994 (#94001168)	Ditch Rd. over the Shiawassee River, Chesaning Township; 43°08′39″N 84°08′06″W	Oakley	Relocated to Chesaning in 1999, destroyed by flood in 2008.
24	Passolt House	Passolt House	October 18, 1972 (#72000653)	1105 S. Jefferson Ave. 43°25′15″N 83°56′27″W	Saginaw	
25	Charles Peters Sr. House	Charles Peters Sr. House	July 9, 1982 (#82002873)	130 N. 6th Ave. 43°25′58″N 83°55′34″W	Saginaw	This house is missing and presumed demolished.
26	Roethke Houses	Roethke Houses	June 8, 2001 (#00001485)	1759 and 1805 Gratiot Ave. 43°24′53″N 83°59′15″W	Saginaw	
27	Russell Sackett House	Russell Sackett House	July 9, 1982 (#82002874)	1604 Court St. 43°25′28″N 83°58′23″W	Saginaw	
28	Saginaw Armory	Saginaw Armory	March 13, 2002 (#02000161)	234 S. Water St. 43°25′53″N 83°56′27″W	Saginaw	
29	Saginaw Central City Historic Residential District	Saginaw Central City Historic Residential District	February 1, 1979 (#79001168)	Roughly bounded by Federal Ave., S. Baum St., Park Ave., and Simoneau St. 43°25′37″N 83°56′02″W	Saginaw	
30	Saginaw City Historic Business District	Saginaw City Historic Business District	July 9, 1982 (#82002876)	Roughly bounded by Saginaw River, S. Michigan, Cleveland and Van Buren Aves. 43°25′01″N 83°57′49″W	Saginaw	
31	Saginaw County Fairgrounds Main Gate	Saginaw County Fairgrounds Main Gate	December 16, 2014 (#14001045)	2701 E. Genesee Ave. 43°24′26″N 83°55′02″W	Saginaw	
32	Saginaw News Building		December 13, 2016 (#16000838)	203 S. Washington Ave. 43°25′54″N 83°56′25″W	Saginaw	
33	Schmidt Site		July 27, 1973 (#73000958)	Address Restricted; 43°20′50″N 83°55′10″W	Bridgeport	Also designated 20SA192
34	Schultz Site (20SA2) Green Point Site (20SA1)		December 8, 1978 (#78002843)	Near Tittabawassee River and Shiawassee River; 43°23′10″N 83°58′10″W	Spaulding Township	
35	South Jefferson Avenue Historic District	South Jefferson Avenue Historic District	July 9, 1982 (#82002877)	Off M-13; 43°25′02″N 83°56′28″W	Saginaw	
36	South Michigan Avenue Historic District		July 9, 1982 (#82002878)	Roughly bounded by Fayette, Lyon, Lee and S. Hamilton Sts. 43°24′44″N 83°58′14″W	Saginaw	
37	St. John's Episcopal Church	St. John's Episcopal Church	July 9, 1982 (#82002879)	509 Hancock St. 43°25′07″N 83°57′50″W	Saginaw	
38	State Street Bridge	State Street Bridge	November 29, 1995 (#95001391)	State St. (Fort Rd.) over the Cass River; 43°21′29″N 83°52′57″W	Bridgeport	
39	Wenzel House	Wenzel House	July 9, 1982 (#82002880)	1203 S. Fayette St. 43°24′40″N 83°58′28″W	Saginaw	
40	West Side Historic Residential District		July 9, 1982 (#82002881)	Roughly bounded by Mason, Madison, Harrison and Lyon Sts. 43°25′13″N 83°58′06″W	Saginaw	
41	Ammi and William Wright House	Ammi and William Wright House	July 9, 1982 (#82002882)	207 Garden Lane; 43°24′50″N 83°59′08″W	Saginaw	

== See also ==
- List of Michigan State Historic Sites in Saginaw County, Michigan
- List of National Historic Landmarks in Michigan
- National Register of Historic Places listings in Michigan
- Listings in neighboring counties: Bay, Clinton, Genesee, Gratiot, Midland, Shiawassee, Tuscola
