= List of Michigan State Historic Sites in Saginaw County =

Location of Saginaw County in Michigan

The following is a list of Michigan State Historic Sites in Saginaw County, Michigan. Sites marked with a dagger (†) are also listed on the National Register of Historic Places in Saginaw County, Michigan.

== Current listings ==
Name	Image	Location	City	Listing date
Arbeiter Hall/Fischer's Hall		713 South Main	Frankenmuth	July 17, 1986
John Barr House		2220 Midland Road (M-47)	Saginaw	July 20, 1989
Bliss Park†		Southwest corner of Houghton Avenue and North Michigan Avenue	Saginaw	October 16, 1997}
Burt Opera House		E Burt Road, between Dorwood and Nichols roads	Burt	July 17, 1975
Central Warehouse†		1840 North Michigan	Saginaw	January 18, 1989
Benjamin Cushway House†	Benjamin Cushway House NRHP 82002865 Saginaw County, MI	1404 South Fayette	Saginaw	February 11, 1972
Dice Wesleyan Methodist Church		R.R. No. 3, 4535 North River Road	Freeland	May 8, 1986
First Congregational Church		403 Jefferson Ave	Saginaw	July 23, 1998
Flint and Pere Marquette Railroad East Saginaw Depot†		501 Potter Street	Saginaw	December 19, 1991
Fort Saginaw		Court and Hamilton streets	Saginaw	August 23, 1956
Fowler Schoolhouse		13240 W Townline	St. Charles	October 10, 1989
Frankenmuth Woolen Mills		570 Main Street	Frankenmuth	April 20, 1995
Freeland United Methodist Church		205 East Washington Street	Freeland	December 15, 1988
Robert Gage Coal Company - Mine No. 8		12633 Beaver Road, north of Townline Road and east of Orr Road	St. Charles vicinity	December 3, 1980
Edward and Emma Germain Carriage House		1573 South Washington Avenue	Saginaw	September 17, 1981
Germans in Michigan Informational Designation		Intersection of Old Main Street and Main Street (M-83)	Frankenmuth	September 17, 1957
Hess School		1520 Houlihan Road, NW corner of Cole Road	Saginaw vicinity	April 4, 1978
Hill District School		11465 Holland Road (M-46) between Block Rd and Gera Rd (M-83)	Reese vicinity	July 26, 1978
Hodges Site (20SA130)		SW 1/4, NE 1/4, Section 35, Spaulding Township	Saginaw vicinity	September 17, 1974
Hoyt Public Library		505 Janes Street	Saginaw	July 23, 1998
Morseville Bridge†		.45 miles (0.72 km) east of Seymour Road, Burt Road	Thomas	September 28, 2000
George Nason House		605 West Broad Street (M-57)	Chesaning	September 8, 1982
Parshallburg Mill (Demolished)		Intersection of Niver and Ditch roads	Parshallburg	February 21, 1975
Passolt House†	Passolt House NRHP 72000653 Saginaw County, MI	1105 South Jefferson Avenue	Saginaw	December 10, 1971
Pere Marquette Railroad Hemlock Depot		900 Maple Street	Saginaw	May 8, 1984
Presbyterian Church of South Saginaw		2312 South Washington Avenue, NE corner of Williamson	Saginaw	April 24, 1981
Clark Lombard Ring House		1126 North Michigan Avenue	Saginaw	October 10, 1989
Theodore H. Roethke / Theodore H. Roethke Childhood Home†		1805 Gratiot Avenue	Saginaw	October 14, 1999
Saginaw Club		219 North Washington Avenue	Saginaw	March 14, 1973
Saginaw Oil Field Discovery Informational Site		1800 Weiss (North side of Weiss at Mershon)	Saginaw	September 28, 2000
Saginaw Post Office†		500 Federal Avenue	Saginaw	June 19, 1971
Saginaw Valley Coal Informational Designation		St. Charles Park, corner of M-52 and Parkway Drive	St. Charles	December 10, 1971
Saginaw Valley Lumbering Era Informational Designation		111 South Michigan	Saginaw	August 15, 1975
Saint Lorenz Lutheran Church		10145 Tuscola Road	Frankenmuth	March 15, 1990
Saint Mary's Hospital		830 South Jefferson Avenue	Saginaw	July 26, 1974
Saint Michael Church and School		17994 Lincoln Road	New Lothrop	July 18, 1996
Saint Paul's Mission - Taymouth		Seymour Road, south of East Burt Road	Morseville vicinity	December 14, 1976
Sauk Indian Village Informational Site		Ezra Rust Park, on the Saginaw River near South Washington Avenue	Saginaw	August 23, 1956
John and Fredricka Schroeder Cabin		Hartley Outdoor Education Center, 12633 Beaver Road, north of Townline Road and east of Orr Road	St. Charles vicinity	January 8, 1981
Henry Steltzriede House		4645 Brockway Road	Saginaw	January 25, 1985
Dr. Leamington B. Stewart House		505 West Broad Street	Chesaning	July 23, 1987
Tittabawassee Boom Company		T13N, R3E	Saginaw	February 12, 1959
Treaty of 1819 Informational Designation		Hamilton and Throop streets	Saginaw	February 18, 1956
Union House Hotel Informational Site		713 South Main Street (M-83)	Frankenmuth	July 21, 1988

== See also ==
- National Register of Historic Places listings in Saginaw County, Michigan

== Sources ==
- Historic Sites Online – Saginaw County. Michigan State Housing Developmental Authority. Accessed May 30, 2011.
