= Central Warehouse =

Central Warehouse may refer to:

- Chambers Transfer & Storage Co.-Central Warehouse, Phoenix, Arizona, listed on the NRHP in Arizona
- Central Warehouse (Saginaw, Michigan), listed on the NRHP in Michigan
- Central Warehouse (Salt Lake City, Utah), listed on the NRHP in Utah
- Central Warehouse (Albany, New York)
