= East Genesee Historic Business District =

- U.S. National Register of Historic Places
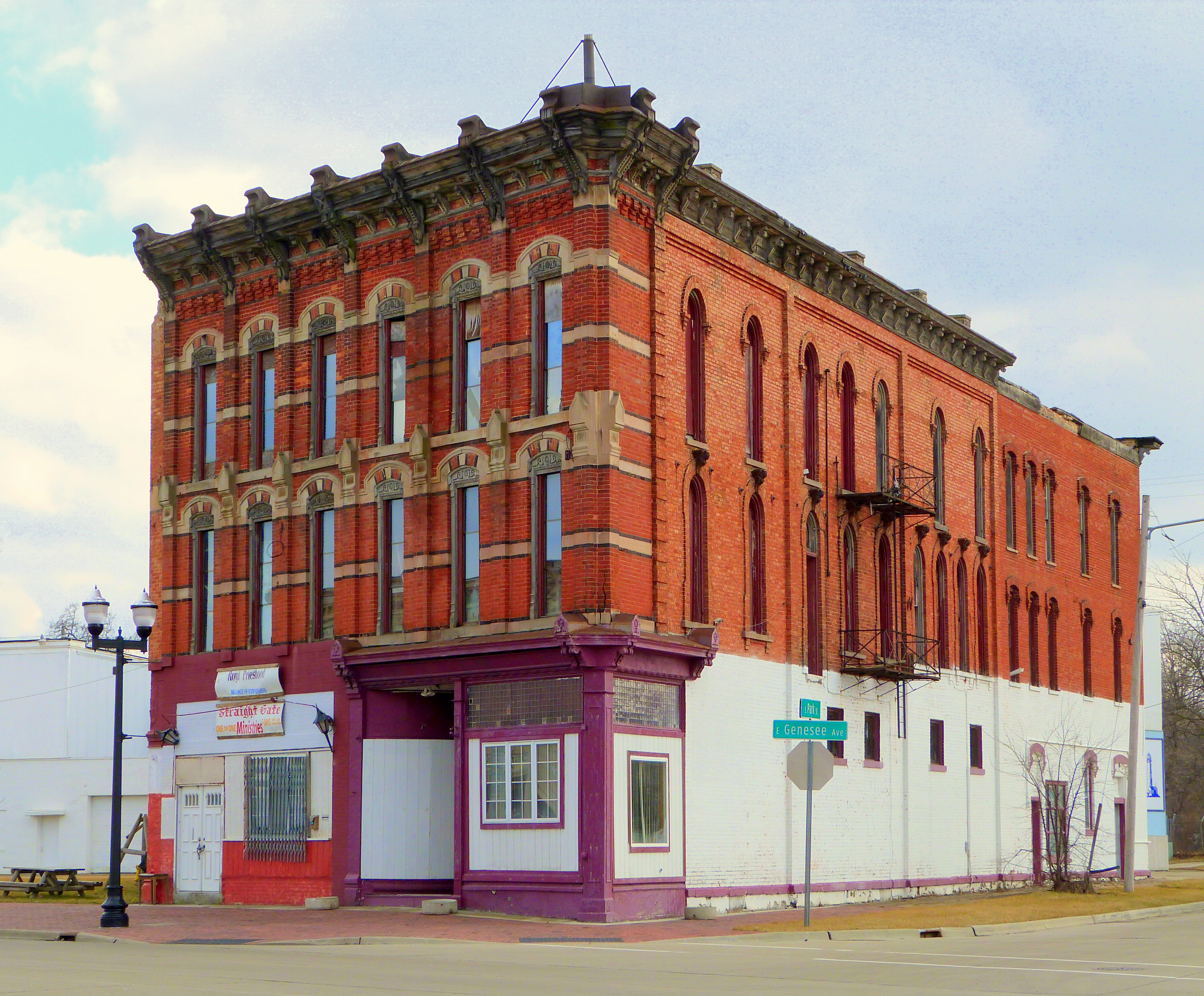
- Baumgarten Building
- Interactive map
- Location: Bounded by Federal, Weadock, 2nd and Janes Sts., Saginaw, Michigan
- Coordinates: 43°25′49″N 83°55′58″W
- Area: 5.5 acres (2.2 ha)
- Architectural style: Italianate, Queen Anne, Romanesque Revival
- MPS: Center Saginaw MRA
- NRHP reference No.: 82002866
- Added to NRHP: July 9, 1982

The East Genesee Historic Business District is a commercial historic district located along a section of East Genesee Avenue in Saginaw, Michigan bounded by Federal, Weadock, 2nd and Janes Streets. It was listed on the National Register of Historic Places in 1982.

== History ==
This section of East Genesee Avenue developed slowly between the 1870s and early 1900s. It was home to a succession of small businesses. Turnover was high, as these small operations either went out of business, or moved on to larger accommodations in the city's central business district. Early in the district's history, it was home to a concentration of German-owned businesses. After the turn of the century and into the 1930s, the area became more diverse. However, by the 1980s, many of the buildings were vacant, or substantially underutilized. By the 2010s, many had been demolished.

== Description ==
The East Genesee Historic Business District covers two blocks of Genesee Avenue. It originally had 23 structures; many have subsequently been demolished. The buildings dated primarily from the 1880s, 1890s and early 1900s. The buildings are Victorian in character, with elements of Italianate, Queen Anne, and Romanesque Revival architecture. The buildings are two- and three-story brick commercial structures, with tall rectangular windows framed with stone. Many buildings have contrasting stone ornamentation.

== Gallery ==
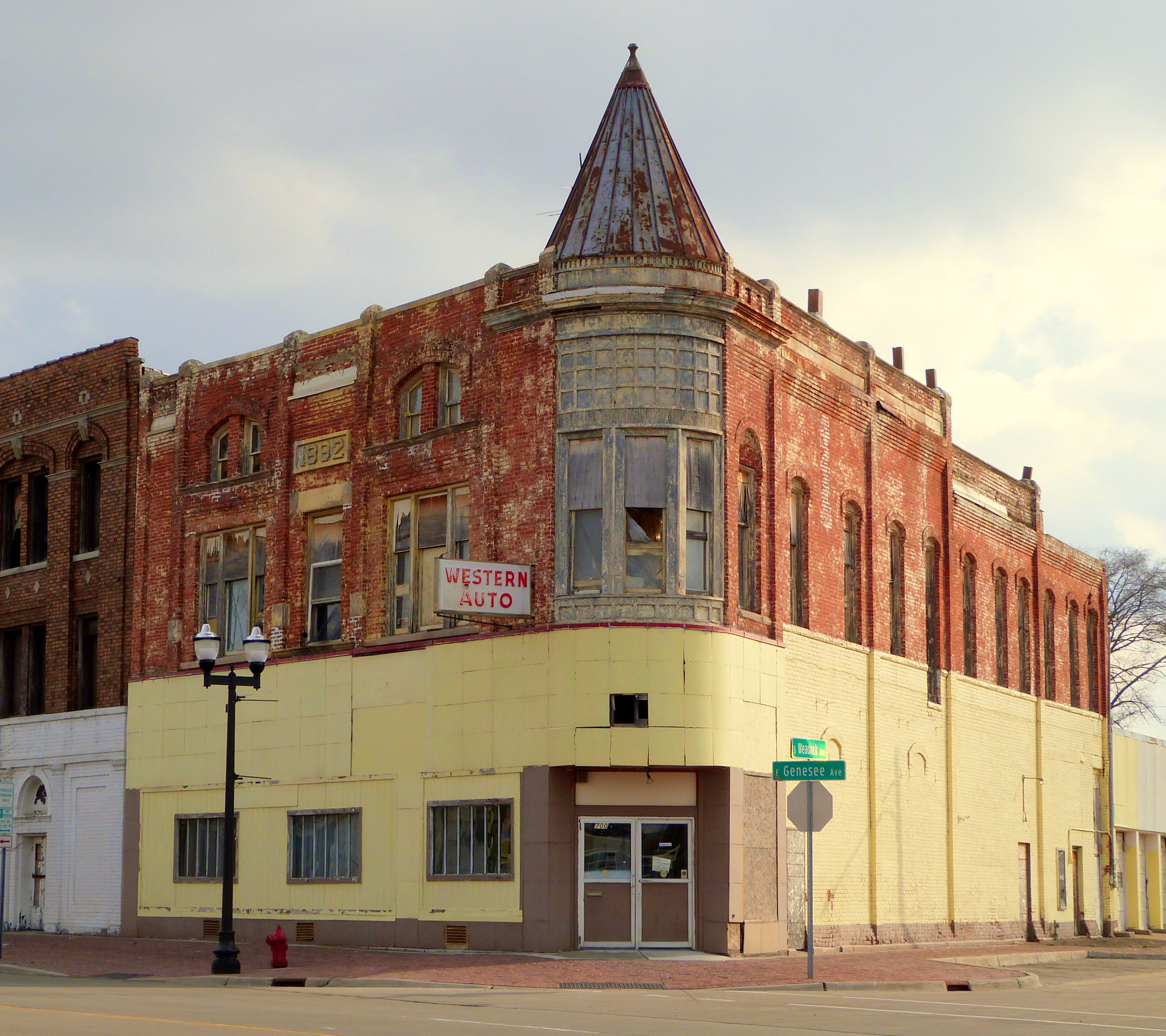
700 E Genesee

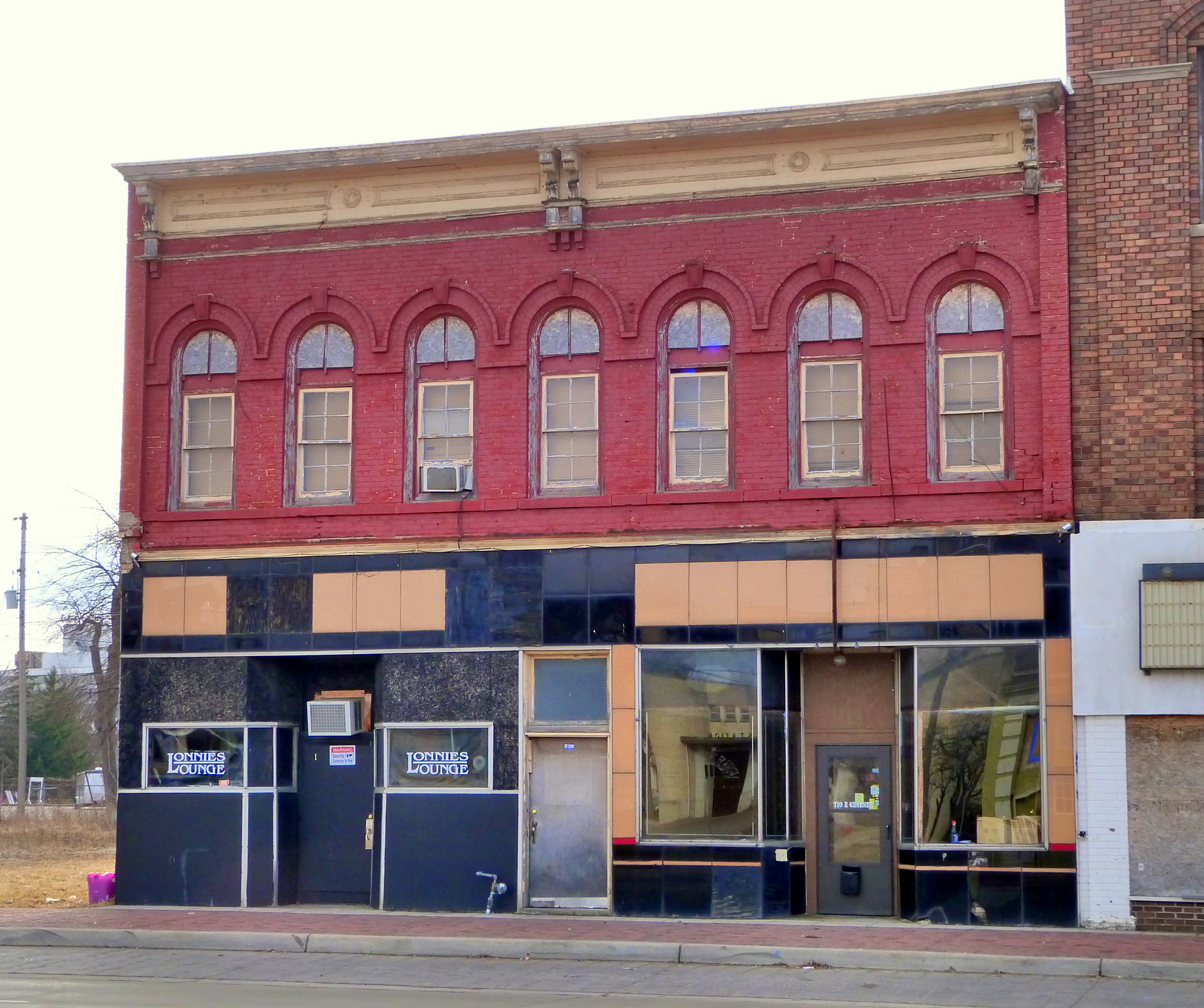
710 E Genesee

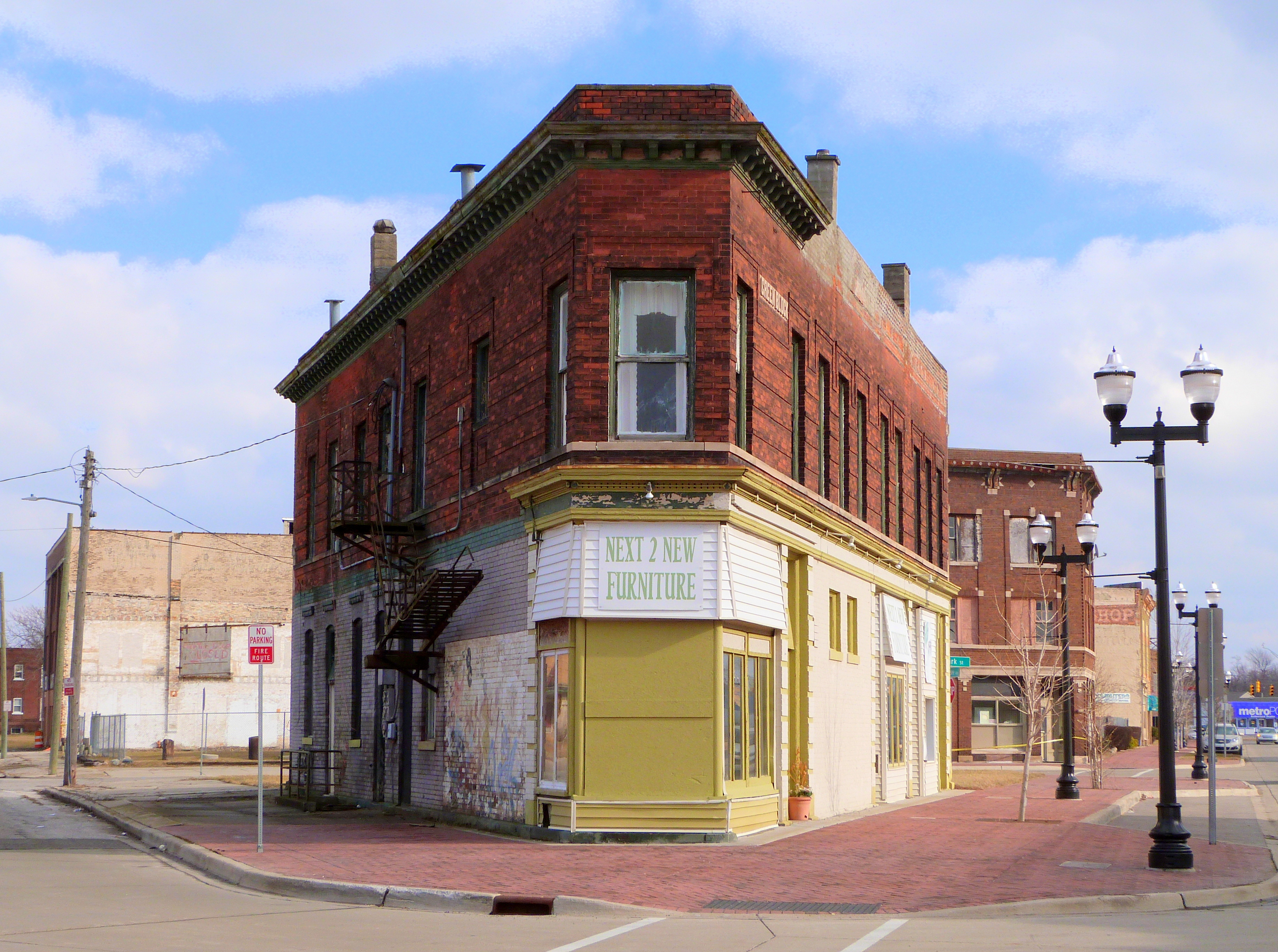
713 E Genesee

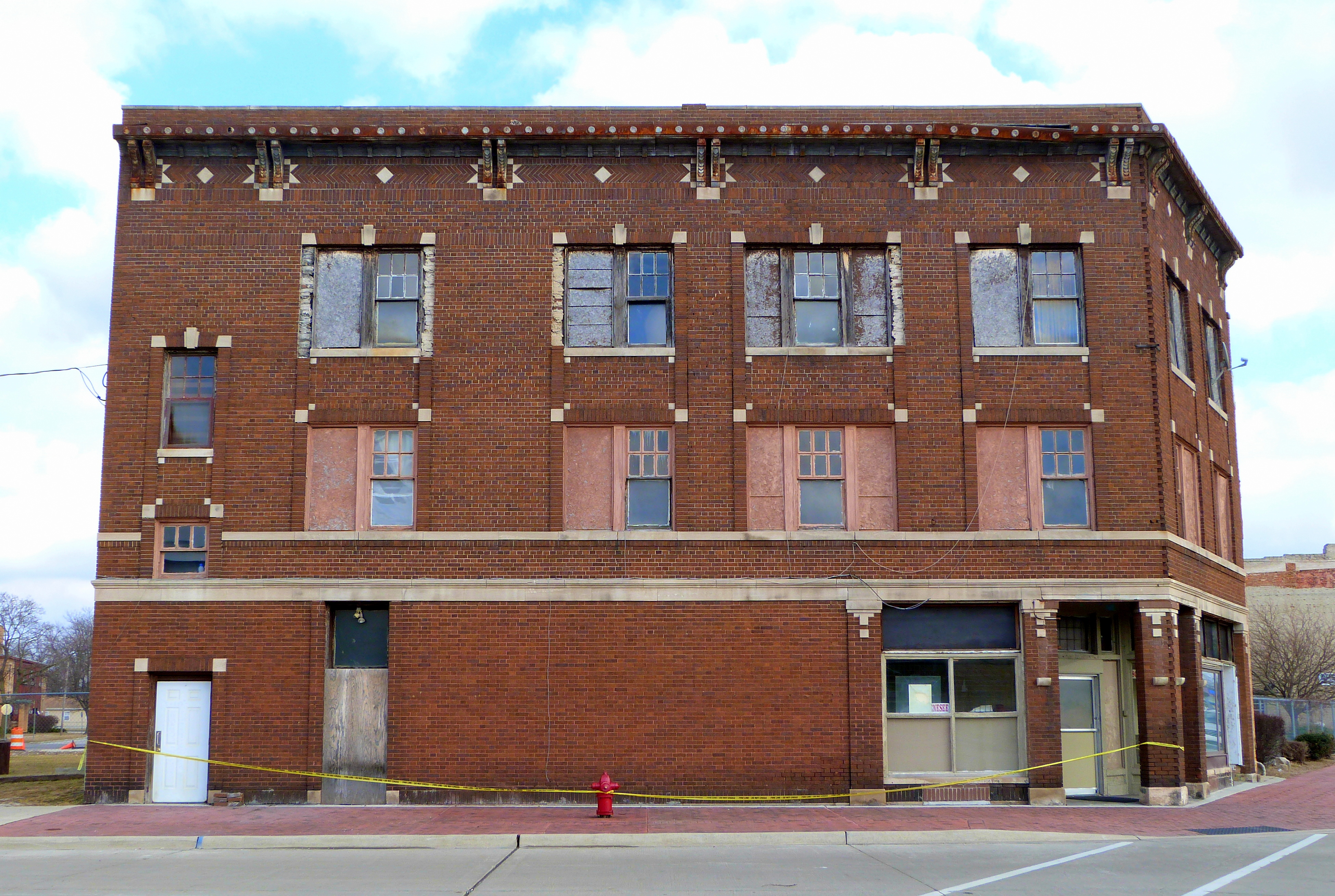
801 E Genesee
