= Abel Brockway House =

- U.S. National Register of Historic Places
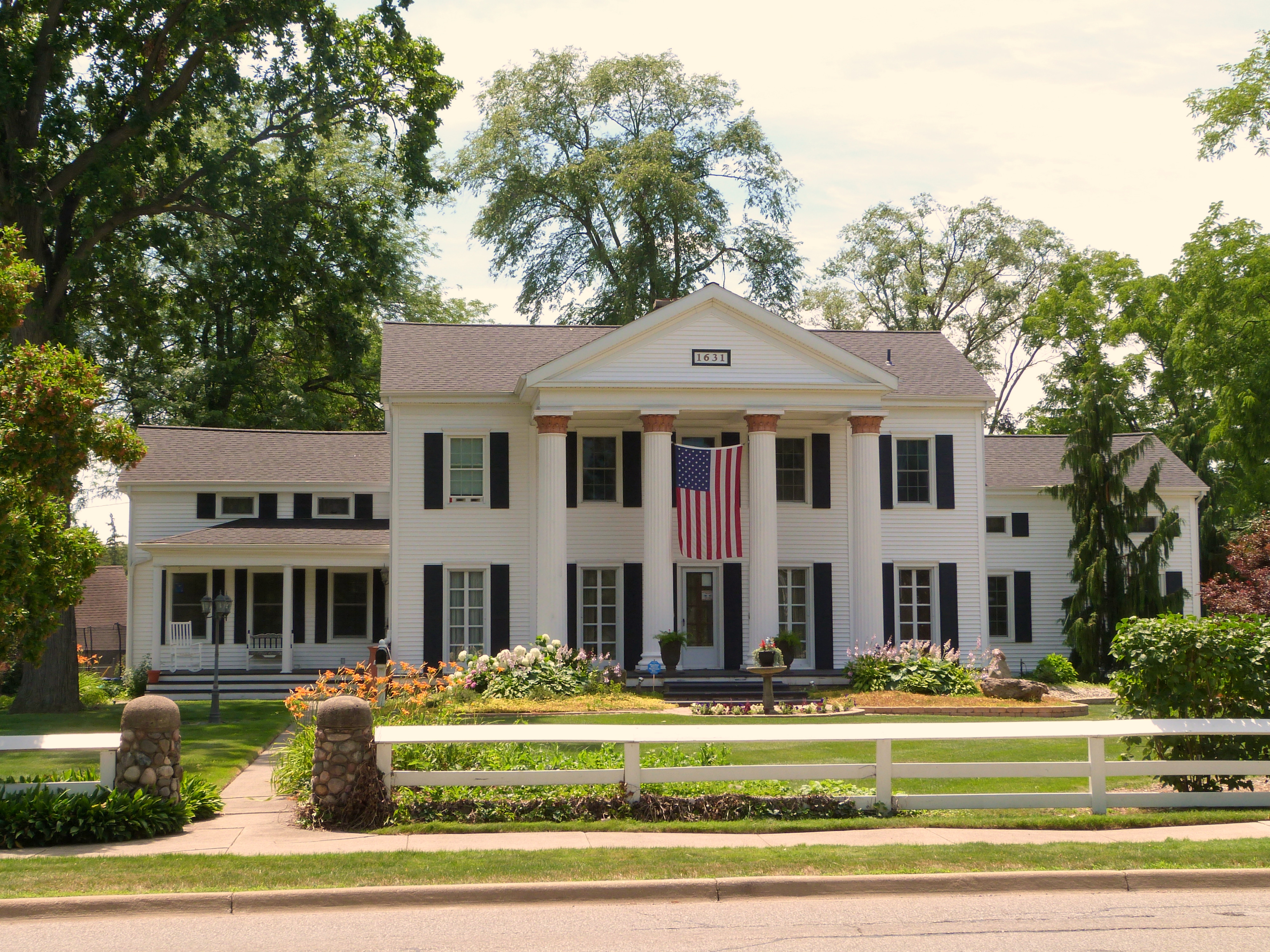

- Location within Michigan Location within the United States
- Interactive map
- Location: 1631 Brockway, Saginaw, Michigan
- Coordinates: 43°25′3″N 83°59′0″W
- Area: less than one acre
- Built: 1864
- Architect: Harker Jackson
- Architectural style: Colonial Revival, Greek Revival
- MPS: Center Saginaw MRA
- NRHP reference No.: 82002862
- Added to NRHP: July 9, 1982

The Abel Brockway House is a single-family home located at 1631 Brockway Street in Saginaw, Michigan. It was listed on the National Register of Historic Places in 1982. The home is claimed to be haunted.

== History ==
Abel Brockway was born in 1818, and arrived in Saginaw in 1856. A shrewd businessman, he invested in a number of early ventures in Saginaw, including lumbering, railroads, banking, and other industries. In 1859, he purchased a plot of farmland (now bounded by Wells, Thurman, Gratiot, and Brockway Streets) from Benjamin Cushway. In 1864, he built a house, which is the center section of what now is known as the Brockway House. Brockway lived in the house until his death in 1886, after which it passed to his daughter Mary. Mary, however, had a wealthy husband and no need of the house or land, and so donated some of the land to the city and platted the rest, selling off lots.

Around 1920, Harker Jackson purchased the house and the surrounding land. Jackson designed and constructed the additions to the house.

== Description ==
The Abel Brockway House is a mix of an original two-story Greek Revival home with 1 1/2-story Colonial Revival wings and a front portico. The columns on the portico are from Dr. Florentine's Hospital for Women, one of Saginaw's earliest medical facilities. It is a symmetrical house with a gable roof and clapboard siding, and features a balanced window placement.

== Paranormal Interest ==
The home is also the current interest in a local movie series that chronicles supposedly haunted buildings and areas throughout Saginaw County, Michigan. The 10th installment, Haunted Saginaw: A Haunting on Brockway Street by Steven T. Shippy and his production crew chronicles their multi-week investigation into the house and the paranormal activity that has been witnessed by the current owners and the filming crew.
