= North Jefferson Avenue Historic District =

- U.S. National Register of Historic Places
- Interactive map
- Location: Carroll and Jefferson Aves., Saginaw, Michigan
- Coordinates: 43°26′15″N 83°56′03″W
- Area: 2.3 acres (0.93 ha)
- Architectural style: Late 19th And 20th Century Revivals, Late Victorian
- MPS: Center Saginaw MRA
- NRHP reference No.: 82002871
- Added to NRHP: July 9, 1982

The North Jefferson Avenue Historic District is a small residential historic district located at the intersection of Carroll and Jefferson Avenues in Saginaw, Michigan. It was listed on the National Register of Historic Places in 1982.

== History ==
By the 1880s, this section of Saginaw was a social center for the well-to-do. It was located comfortably in between two commercial hubs, but provided a quiet residential setting. Some of Saginaw's most prominent families constructed homes in this district, and in the area immediately north. The area remained fashionable into the latter half of the 20th century, when the age of the structures and the unpopularity of city living depressed the neighborhood. Urban renewal and clearance in the 1970s further changed the character of the neighborhood, leaving oddly park-like green spaces surrounding the massive 19th century mansions.

== Description ==
The North Jefferson Avenue Historic District originally consisted of four large houses (one has since been demolished) surrounding the intersection of Carroll and Jefferson Avenues. These four massive homes were once the core of the surrounding fashionable neighborhood, but now serve as something of a gateway, standing just north of a freeway onramp. The four homes in the district are each of a different architectural style. Queen Anne, Georgian Revival, Tudor Revival, and Italianate.
