= Saginaw City Historic Business District =

- U.S. National Register of Historic Places
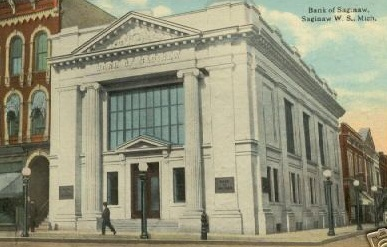
- Bank of Saginaw, c. 1910
- Interactive map
- Location: Roughly bounded by Saginaw River, S. Michigan, Cleveland and Van Buren Aves., Saginaw, Michigan
- Coordinates: 43°25′01″N 83°57′49″W
- Area: 33.8 acres (13.7 ha)
- Architect: Multiple
- Architectural style: Chicago, Italianate, Queen Anne
- MPS: Center Saginaw MRA
- NRHP reference No.: 82002876
- Added to NRHP: July 9, 1982

The Saginaw City Historic Business District is a primarily commercial historic district located between Michigan Avenue and the Saginaw River, from Cleveland to Van Buren Avenues, in Saginaw, Michigan. It was listed on the National Register of Historic Places in 1982.

== History ==
The first development in this area was the establishment of Fort Saginaw in 1822, located near what is now the intersection of Court and Hamilton Streets. The fort was abandoned in 1823, but the site remained in use by traders. Between 1830 and 1850, development spread out along the river bank, with commercial and residential structures along with small lumber mills. By this time, much of the available land on the west side of the river had been developed, and businesses looking for larger parcels turned to the east side. The west side remained the home of smaller businesses, as well as saloons, hotels, and restaurants serving the lumberjacks and other area laborers. Shopkeepers included a heavy concentration of Germanic immigrants.

The earliest structures in the district were rough wood buildings, often with Greek Revival. However, a series of fires in the nineteenth century periodically destroyed these wooden buildings, and by 1860 replacement structures were brick, and often three- or four-story Italianate blocks. The structures in the district maintained easy access to the river, as most goods coming to and from Saginaw were transported on the river until nearly 1890.

== Description ==
The Saginaw City Historic Business District contains 86 structures, of which 71 contribute to the historic character of the neighborhood. The buildings are primarily commercial in usage, with light industrial buildings located near the river in the southern section of the district. Most of the structures date from the nineteenth century, and reflect the Italianate style popular at the time. Other architectural styles in the district include Queen Anne, Georgian Revival, and Chicago School.

Significant structures in the district include:

- Fordney Hotel (401 Court): Built in 1868 at the site of the old fort, this four story hotel was originally the Taylor House. The hotel closed in 1895, and reopened in 1912 under the name Hotel Fordney after Congressman Joseph W. Fordney.
- Schuch Hotel (301 North Hamilton): Built in 1868, the Schuch Hotel is a three-story brick Italianate structure. It was originally the Brockway House, and was renamed the Benson House, and later the Crowley House.
- Benjamin Stable (300 South Hamilton): Built in 1882, this was a brick Queen Anne structure that housed a stable and carriage rental facilities at the first floor level and a mortuary at the second.
- Merrill Building (423 Court): Built in 1892, the Merrill building was a three-story Italianate building. Ippels Department Store moved into the building in 1905 and purchased the building in 1980.
- Bank of Saginaw Building (400 Court): Built in 1911, this Neo-Classical Revival-style bank was erected by the Bank of Saginaw, founded in 1888. The Bank of Saginaw folded during the Great Depression, and the Second National Bank moved into the building.
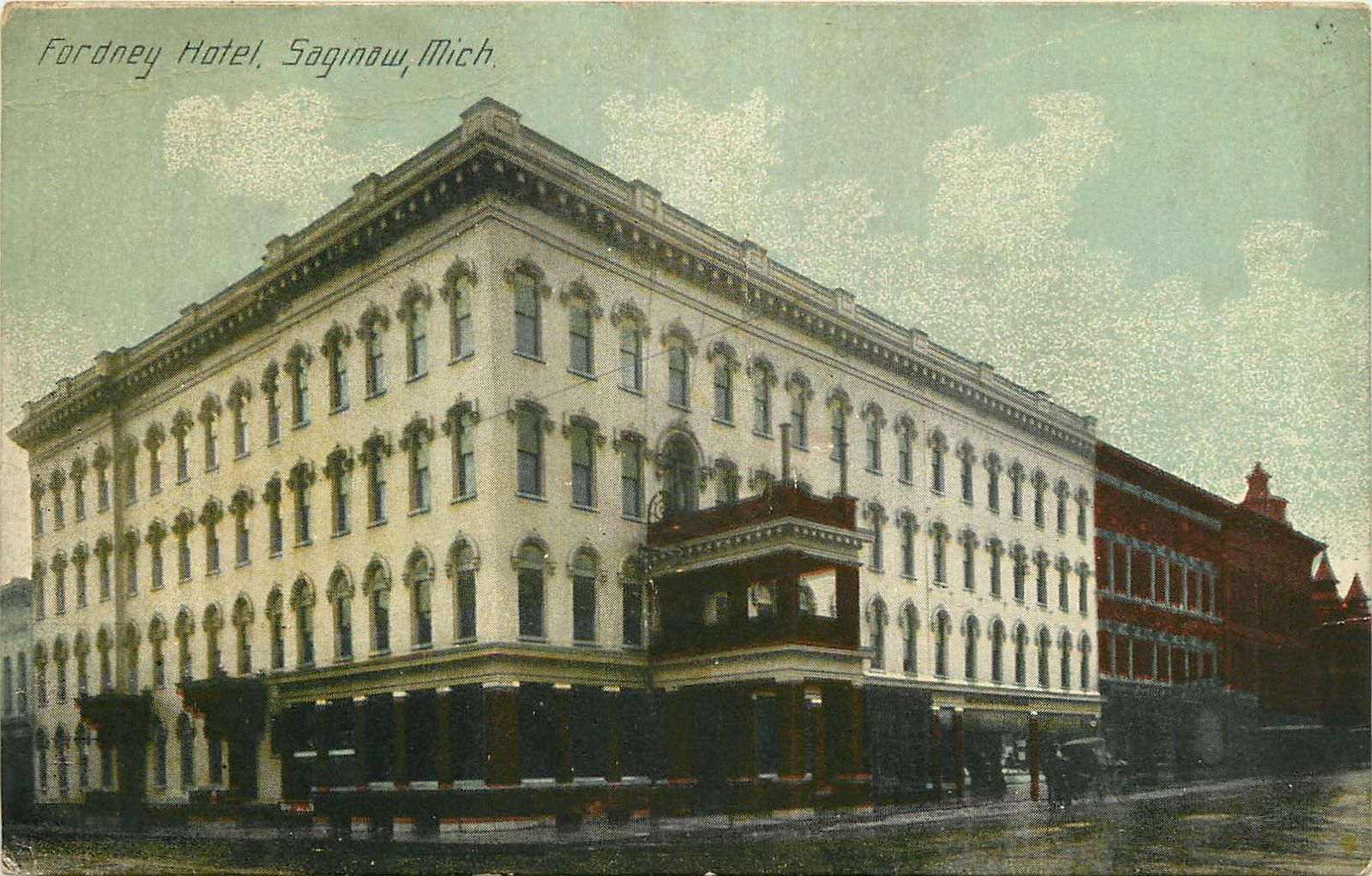
Fordney Hotel, 1910

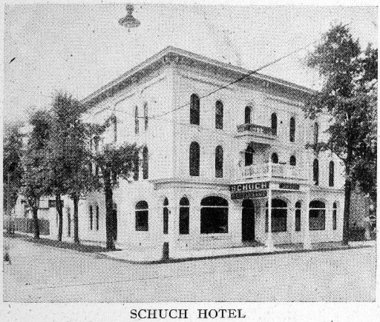
Schuch Hotel, 1912
