= Fosters Site =

Archaeological site in Michigan, United States

- Fosters Site (20SA74)
- U.S. National Register of Historic Places
- Location within Michigan Location within the United States
- Location: Address Restricted, near Fosters, Michigan
- Coordinates: 43°18′00″N 83°56′00″W
- Area: 4.5 acres (1.8 ha)
- NRHP reference No.: 82000544
- Added to NRHP: October 29, 1982

The Fosters Site, designated 20SA74, is an archaeological site located near Bridgeport, Michigan. It was listed on the National Register of Historic Places in 1982.

Fosters Site, located beside the Flint River, is the site of a village dating from the Late Woodland period. The village was likely seasonally occupied in the fall and winter. It was excavated in 1967 by researchers from the University of Michigan Museum of Archaeology, who found ceramic shards, triangular weapon points, and fish and plant remains.
