= Wenzel House =

- U.S. National Register of Historic Places
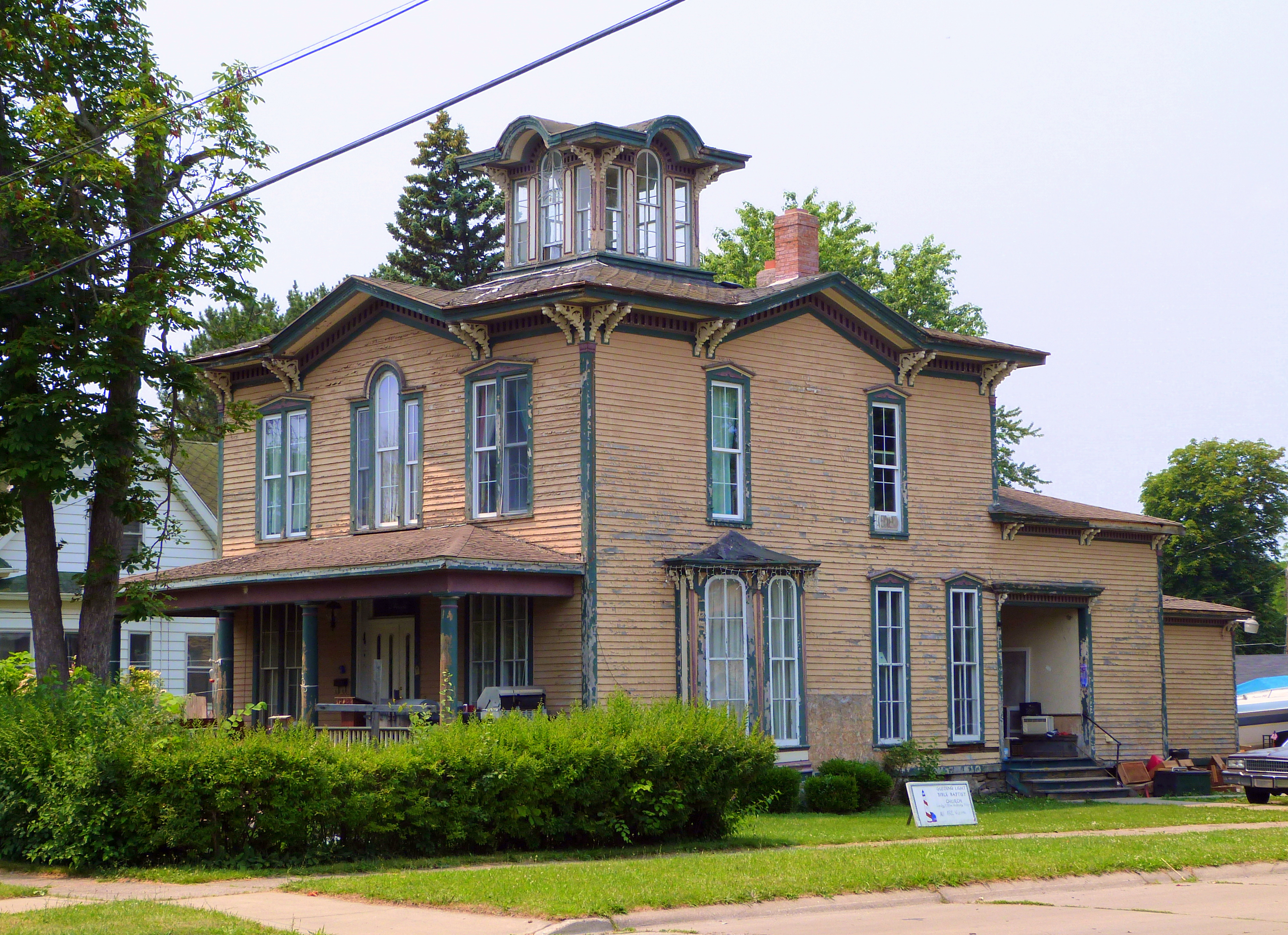
- Interactive map
- Location: 1203 S. Fayette, Saginaw, Michigan
- Coordinates: 43°24′40″N 83°58′28″W
- Area: less than one acre
- Built: 1874
- Architectural style: Classical Revival, Italianate
- MPS: Center Saginaw MRA
- NRHP reference No.: 82002880
- Added to NRHP: July 9, 1982

The Wenzel House is a single family home located at 1203 South Fayette in Saginaw, Michigan. It was listed on the National Register of Historic Places in 1982.

== History ==
This house was constructed in 1874 for Mr. Wenzel, a Saginaw harness maker. It was later sold to Harold Sperbeck, who owned it into the 1980s.

== Description ==
The Wenzel House is a two-story frame Italianate house with bracketed eaves and a pediment breaking the eavesline of each facade. The house has a low-pitched hip roof, with a twelve pane belvedere having an arched roof line in the center of the main roof. A one-story wing is connected to the rear, and has an alcove porch rimmed by dentils. A classically-inspired front porch is a later addition; it has a hipped roof, balustrade, and columns.
