= House at 1514 N. Michigan Street =

- U.S. National Register of Historic Places
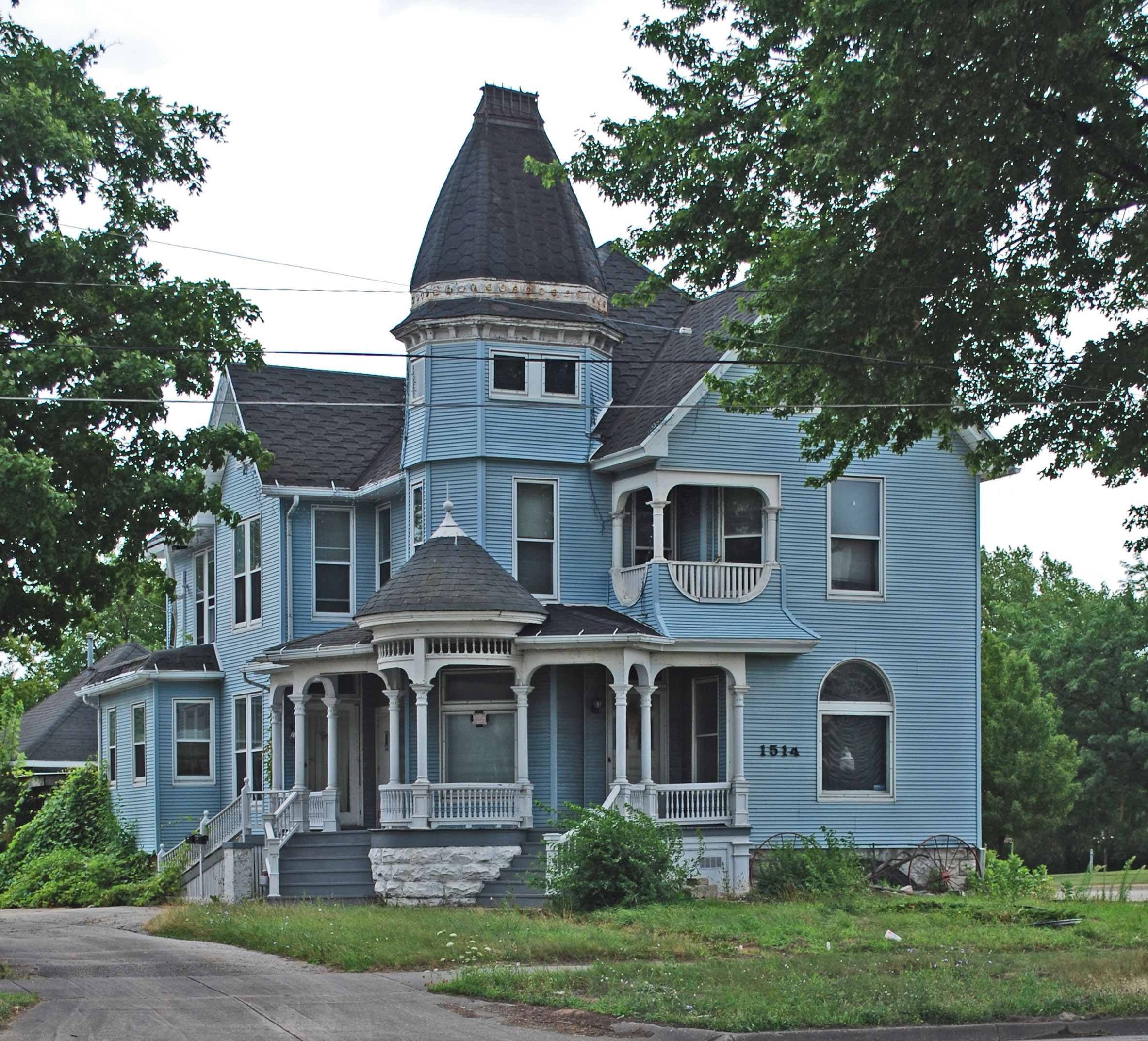
- Interactive map
- Location: 1514 N. Michigan St., Saginaw, Michigan
- Coordinates: 43°25′46″N 83°57′02″W
- Area: less than one acre
- Built: 1880
- Architectural style: Queen Anne
- Demolished: 2018
- MPS: Center Saginaw MRA
- NRHP reference No.: 82002869
- Added to NRHP: July 9, 1982

The House at 1514 N. Michigan Street was a single family home located at 1514 N. Michigan Street in Saginaw, Michigan. It was listed on the National Register of Historic Places in 1982.

== History ==
The house at 1514 N. Michigan Street was constructed in c. 1880, in a location that was at the time a fashionable area. The house was later turned into a medical laboratory. By 2018, the house was vacant and was subsequently demolished. A new-build commercial structure was constructed on the site of the house and a neighboring home to the north in 2019.

== Description ==
The house at 1514 N. Michigan Street was a two-story wood frame Queen Anne house covered with clapboard. It had an octagonal tower and a round porch pavilion at one corner. Curved stairs framed the pavilion, which had a conical roof. The tower was topped by a curved hipped roof. The house exhibited other Queen Anne features such as bay windows, corbeled chimneys, porch and fascia spindlework, eave brackets, and an asymmetrically massing and roofline.
