= South Michigan Avenue Historic District =

- U.S. National Register of Historic Places
- Interactive map
- Location: Roughly bounded by Fayette, Lyon, Lee and S. Hamilton Sts., Saginaw, Michigan
- Coordinates: 43°24′44″N 83°58′14″W
- Area: 15 acres (6.1 ha)
- Architectural style: Colonial Revival, Bungalow/American craftsman, Late Victorian
- MPS: Center Saginaw MRA
- NRHP reference No.: 82002878
- Added to NRHP: July 9, 1982

The South Michigan Avenue Historic District is a primarily residential historic district located along South Michigan Avenue between Lyon and Lee Streets in Saginaw, Michigan. It was listed on the National Register of Historic Places in 1982.

== History ==
Development of this neighborhood began in the 1870s, and progressed slowly and evenly throughout the neighborhood. By 1890, nearly every block had at least one house, and nearly equal numbers of houses were constructed in the periods before 1890, between 1890 and 1900, between 1904 and 1909, and between 1912 and 1919. Residents of the district tended to be wealthy, yet conservative in their tastes, leading to an elegant and restrained neighborhood. Early residents included lumbermen George Stark, Lorenzo B. Curtis, and T.J. Jerome, C.Q. Lee, harness maker Phillip Offergelt, and stable owner Charles Benjamin. In the 20th century, some of the larger houses in the district were converted to office space and other business uses.

== Description ==
The South Michigan Avenue Historic District contains 41 structures, 40 of which contribute to the historic character of the neighborhood. Architectural styles found within the district range from Carpenter Gothic, Italianate, and Queen Anne to Georgian Revival, Dutch Revival, and Bungaloid. The distinct periods of development through the neighborhood, and the uniform pace, gives each block a variation of architectural styles. Much of the district sits on a rise above the river floodplain, giving the neighborhood a hilltop ambiance.

Significant structures in the district include:

- George Stark House (704 S. Michigan): This home was constructed for George Stark in 1874. It is a two-story frame Carpenter Gothic house with Italianate influences. After Stark's death, the house was used as a health center, rest home, and a group home.
- 619 S. Michigan: This 1874 house is an unusual Italianate structure, combining the Italianate with Greek Revival massing and gable returns and Georgian Revival details of the front porch and the porte cochere.
- 1008 S. Michigan: This house, constructed in 1914, exhibits a transitional design between the earlier Queen Anne style and later Georgian Revival and Bungaloid styles of the twentieth century.
