= Saginaw Armory =

- U.S. National Register of Historic Places
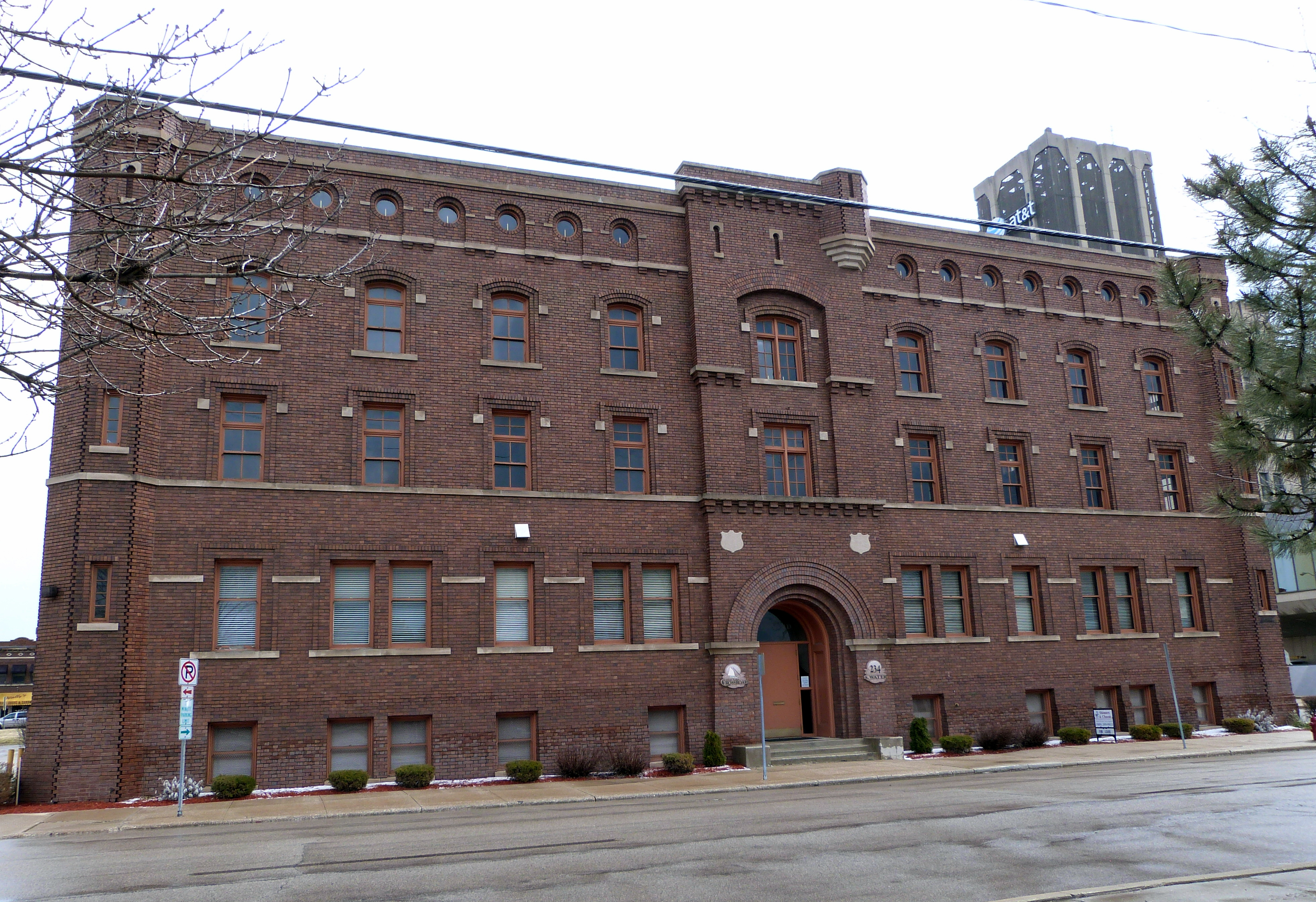
- Interactive map
- Location: 234 S. Water St., Saginaw, Michigan
- Coordinates: 43°25′53″N 83°56′26″W
- Area: less than one acre
- Built: 1909
- Built by: John H. Qualmann
- Architect: William T. Cooper
- Architectural style: Late Gothic Revival
- NRHP reference No.: 02000161
- Added to NRHP: March 13, 2002

The Saginaw Armory is a former National Guard installation located at 234 South Water Street in Saginaw, Michigan. It was listed on the National Register of Historic Places in 2002.

== History ==
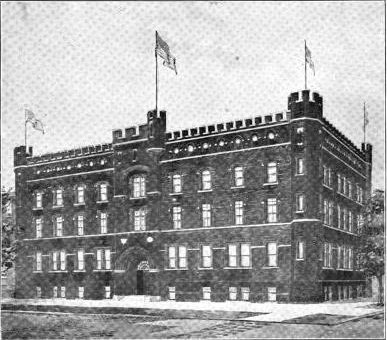
Saginaw Armory in the early 1900s

In 1903, the passage of the Dick Act spurred the state of Michigan to revamp its laws covering the state National Guard. By 1907, the new laws in place provided a fund for the construction local armories for the use of National Guard units. In 1908, Saginaw received $20,000 of the available $40,000 in state monies toward the construction of a building to house the local National Guard and Naval Brigade. The city hired architect William T. Cooper to design a building, and approved the expenditure af an additional $10,000 to cover additional construction costs. In 1909, the construction contract was awarded to John H. Qualmann of Saginaw; ground was broken in April of that year. Dirt from the building site was dumped nearby along the river to make a park and parade ground. The building was completed by 1910.

The Armory remained occupied by Company B of the Michigan National Guard until 1983, when the unit moved to a new suburban facility. During this time. it was renovated in the 1950s; likely when the crenelations at the top of the building were removed. After the National Guard moved, the building was sold multiple times, and occupied by businesses. It was renovated in 2009.

== Description ==
The Saginaw Armory is a three-story castellated Late Gothic Revival brick structure with a large raised basement and an attic above. The building is topped with a stone-capped parapet wall (originally crenelated) and five-sided towers on each corner. On the main facade, a central entrance bay extends from the mass of the building, and contains a recessed entrance within a round arch. Above, a segmental arch rises two stories, containing a window in each story. A small corbelled turret is located in one corner of the bay. In the remainder of the facade, stone stringcourses run between the first and second floors, between the third floor and the attic, and at the base of the parapet wall.

The windows in the basement and first floor are one-over-one units with square tops and stone sills. The second and third floor windows are two-over-two double-hung wood units with four-pane transoms at the second floor and two-pane transoms at the third floor. The windows are in square top openings on the second floor and segmental-arch openings on the third. The attic level contains a row of oculus windows set within round arches.
