= Ammi and William Wright House =

- U.S. National Register of Historic Places
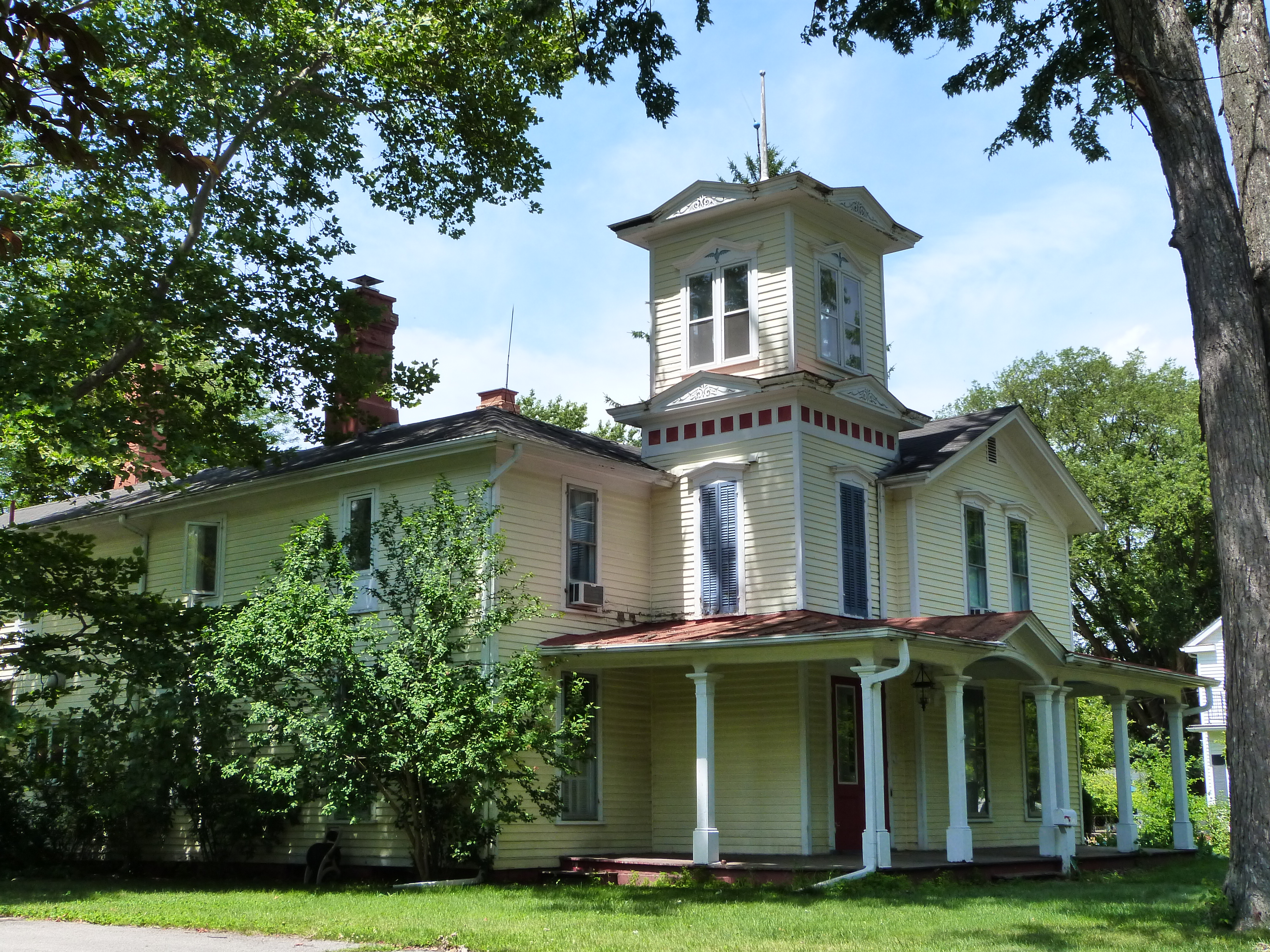
- Interactive map
- Location: 207 Garden Lane, Saginaw, Michigan
- Coordinates: 43°24′50″N 83°59′08″W
- Area: 2 acres (0.81 ha)
- Built: 1854
- Architectural style: Italianate
- MPS: Center Saginaw MRA
- NRHP reference No.: 82002882
- Added to NRHP: July 9, 1982

The Ammi and William Wright House is a single family home located at 207 Garden Lane in Saginaw, Michigan. It was listed on the National Register of Historic Places in 1982.

== History ==
Ammi W. Wright was born and raised on his father's farm in New England. In 1851, he came to Saginaw, and began investing in what was then a frontier town. In 1854, he constructed this house for his family. Over the next two decades, Wright invested in a series of sawmills and other businesses, and his fortunes grew with the fortunes of the city. In 1878, with his wife's health failing, Wright moved to Sarasota, New York, and turned his Saginaw business interestes over to his brother William. William Wright lived in the 1854 home until his death, when it was deeded to his children Harriet and Robert, who also lived there.

== Description ==
The Wright House is a two-story, T-shaped farmhouse with elaborate vernacular Italianate detail. It has a tall front tower with a pedimented roofline. Tall one-over-one double hung sash window units have carved enframements. The house also has a bay window, and a front porch with a standing seam metal roof. A small carriage house which was adjacent to the home has been made into a dining room addition.
