= The Grove (Saginaw, Michigan) =

- U.S. National Register of Historic Places
- U.S. Historic district
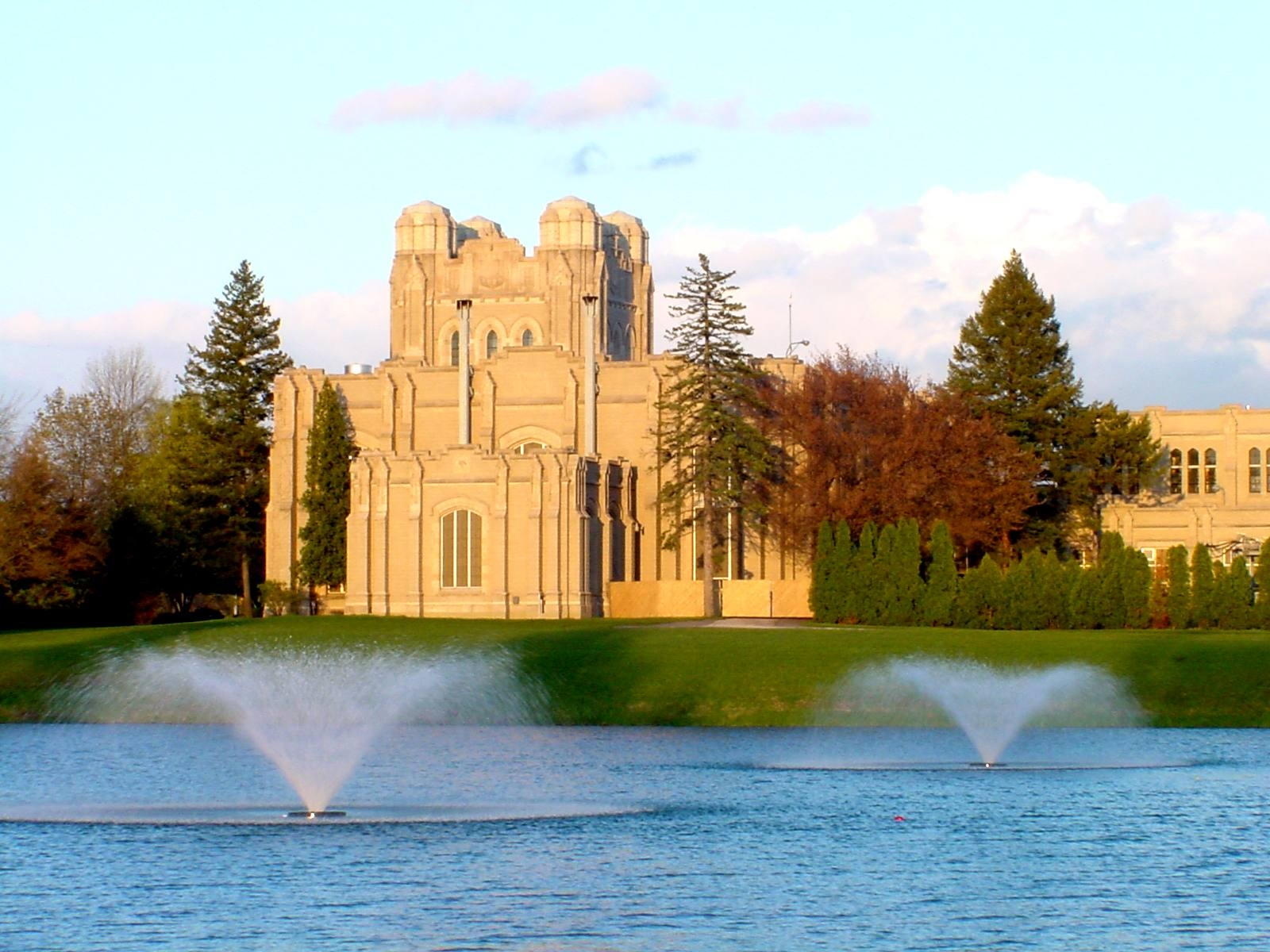
- The Saginaw Waterworks

- Location within Michigan Location within the United States
- Interactive map
- Location: S. Washington, Saginaw, Michigan
- Coordinates: 43°24′58″N 83°57′4″W
- Area: 56.4 acres (22.8 ha)
- Architect: Multiple
- Architectural style: Late 19th And 20th Century Revivals, Italianate, Shingle Style
- MPS: Center Saginaw MRA
- NRHP reference No.: 82002868
- Added to NRHP: July 9, 1982

The Grove is residential and institutional historic district located along South Washington Street in Saginaw, Michigan. It was listed on the National Register of Historic Places in 1982.

== History ==
The area that is now the Grove saw its first development in the 1870s. During this time, a series of homes was built in the northern section of the district. A second round of development began in 1908, when dredging and other civic improvements made lots in the southern section of the district more desirable. The city waterworks was constructed in 1929 at one end of the district, and in 1936 the City Hall was added at the opposite end. Due to the location of the City, Hall, some of large residential properties were purchased by the city and converted into municipal offices, and others were converted to private business offices.

== Description ==
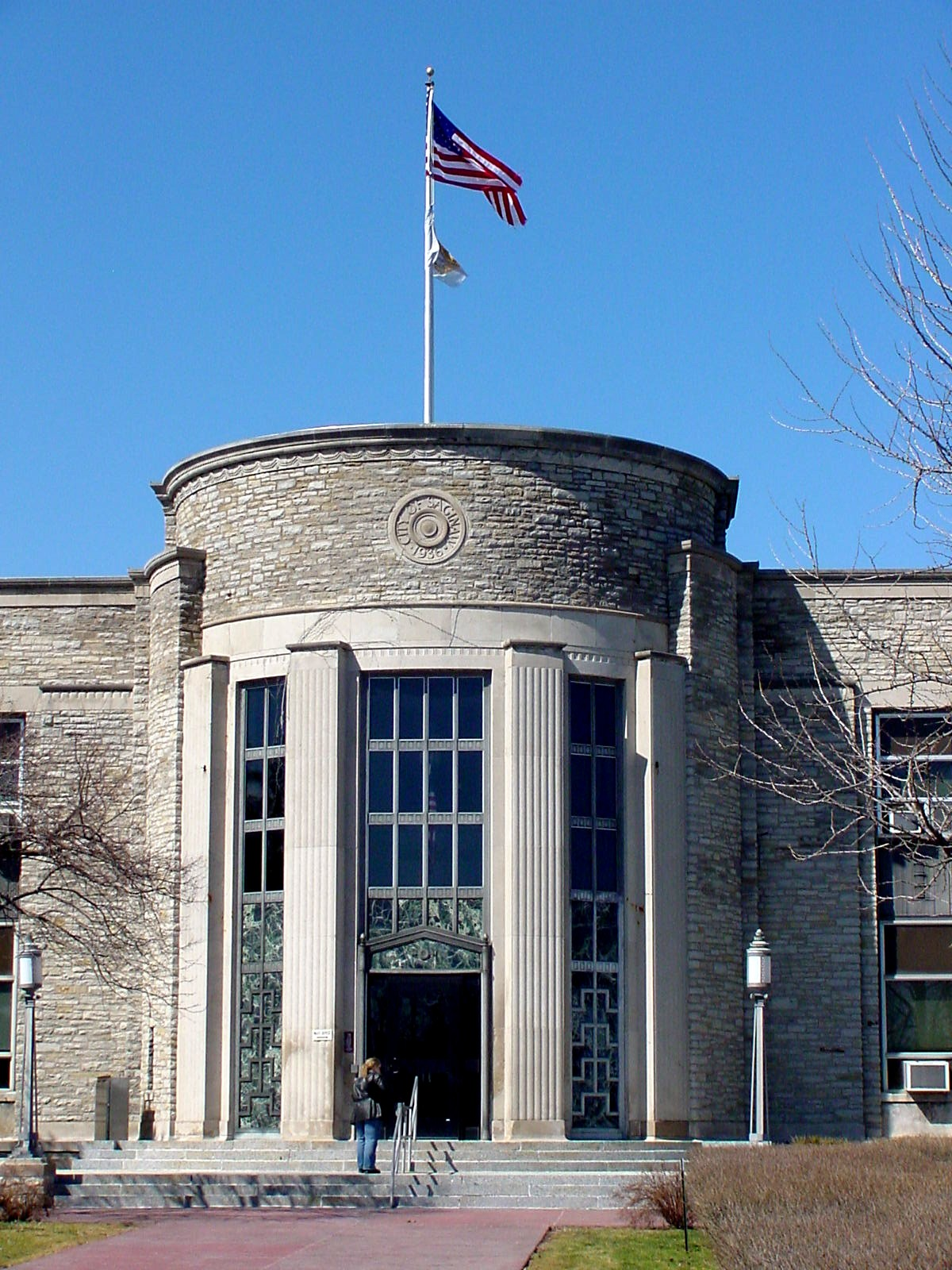
Saginaw City Hall

The Grove originally contained 18 major structures, of which 17 contribute to the historic character of the district. Much of the land is owned by the city, including the large City Hall and waterworks buildings. Additional land is owned by the Holy Family Catholic Church, located near the northern part of the district. The remaining structures were built as private homes (although most have been converted to other uses). These homes were built in a range of architectural styles, including Italianate, Georgian Revival, and Shingle style.

The two most prominent houses in the district are the T .B. Corning House at 1446 S. Washington and the Montague House 1531 S. Washington. The Corning House was constructed in 1872 for T .B. Corning, a salt and boat building magnate. It is a buff brick Italianate house with a mansard roof and a central tower, reflecting a Second Empire influence. THe Montague House was constructed in 1928. It is a three-story Georgian Revival home.
