= Russell Sackett House =

- U.S. National Register of Historic Places
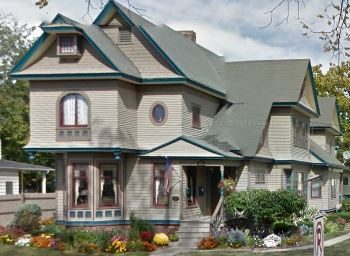
- Interactive map
- Location: 1604 Court, Saginaw, Michigan
- Coordinates: 43°25′27″N 83°58′24″W
- Area: less than one acre
- Built: 1889
- Architectural style: Queen Anne, Shingle Style
- MPS: Center Saginaw MRA
- NRHP reference No.: 82002874
- Added to NRHP: July 9, 1982

The Russell Sackett House is a single family home located at 1604 Court Street in Saginaw, Michigan. It was listed on the National Register of Historic Places in 1982.

== History ==
The lot on which this house stands was owned by a series of land speculators from 1835 to 1895. In 1899, Russell Sackett bought the land and had a home constructed for his family. Sackett was a traveling salesman who settled in Saginaw. After Sackett left, the house was owned by a clothing merchant, the later a real estate agent and a lawyer. The last two owners converted the house for use as an office.

== Description ==
The Russell Sackett House is a two-story Queen Anne home with Shingle Style elements. It has irregular massing, with a second story over-hang, extended gable ends, and two-sided bays. Many of the windows have small panes above a larger rectangular panes. Shingle Style elements of the design include a restrained use of ornamentation, and a lower, sweeping roofline. At one time, the house had a large wraparound porch which was removed and replaced with a small pediment roof supported by narrow pillars.
