= Schultz and Green Point Sites =

Archaeological sites in Michigan, United States

- Schultz site (20SA2) Green Point site (20SA1)
- U.S. National Register of Historic Places
- Location within Michigan Location within the United States
- Location: Tittabawassee River and Shiawassee River, Spaulding Township, Michigan
- Coordinates: 43°23′10″N 83°58′10″W
- Area: 74 acres (30 ha)
- NRHP reference No.: 78002843
- Added to NRHP: December 8, 1978

The Schultz Site (designate 20SA2) and the Green Point Site (designated 20SA1) are two adjacent archaeological sites located near the confluence of the Tittabawassee River and Shiawassee River in Spaulding Township, Michigan. the two sites were listed together on the National Register of Historic Places in 1973.

== Schultz site ==
The Schultz site was occupied nearly continuously from about 1100 BC to 600 AD. The site was likely used as a seasonal camp, occupied in the spring and fall. It was first investigated in modern times in 1959-1964 by researchers from the University of Michigan Museum of Natural History. Later investigations were undertaken by researchers from Michigan State University. Ceramics, charcoal, and animal bones were recovered. The site contained hearth locations, refuse pits, and post molds.

The Schultz site is located at the edge of a flat wetland near the river, slightly upland on a levee. The full extent runs for nearly a mile.

== Green Point Site ==
The Green Point Site is a large site, and was recorded in the early 20th century. Burial mounds are located at the site, and burials were reported to continue here even in the nineteenth century. At an unknown date previous to 1950, an amateur archaeologist discovered human remains on the surface at the site and donated them to the University of Michigan. The site was first excavated in 1969.
