= St. John's Episcopal Church (Saginaw, Michigan) =

Historic church in Michigan, United States

- U.S. National Register of Historic Places
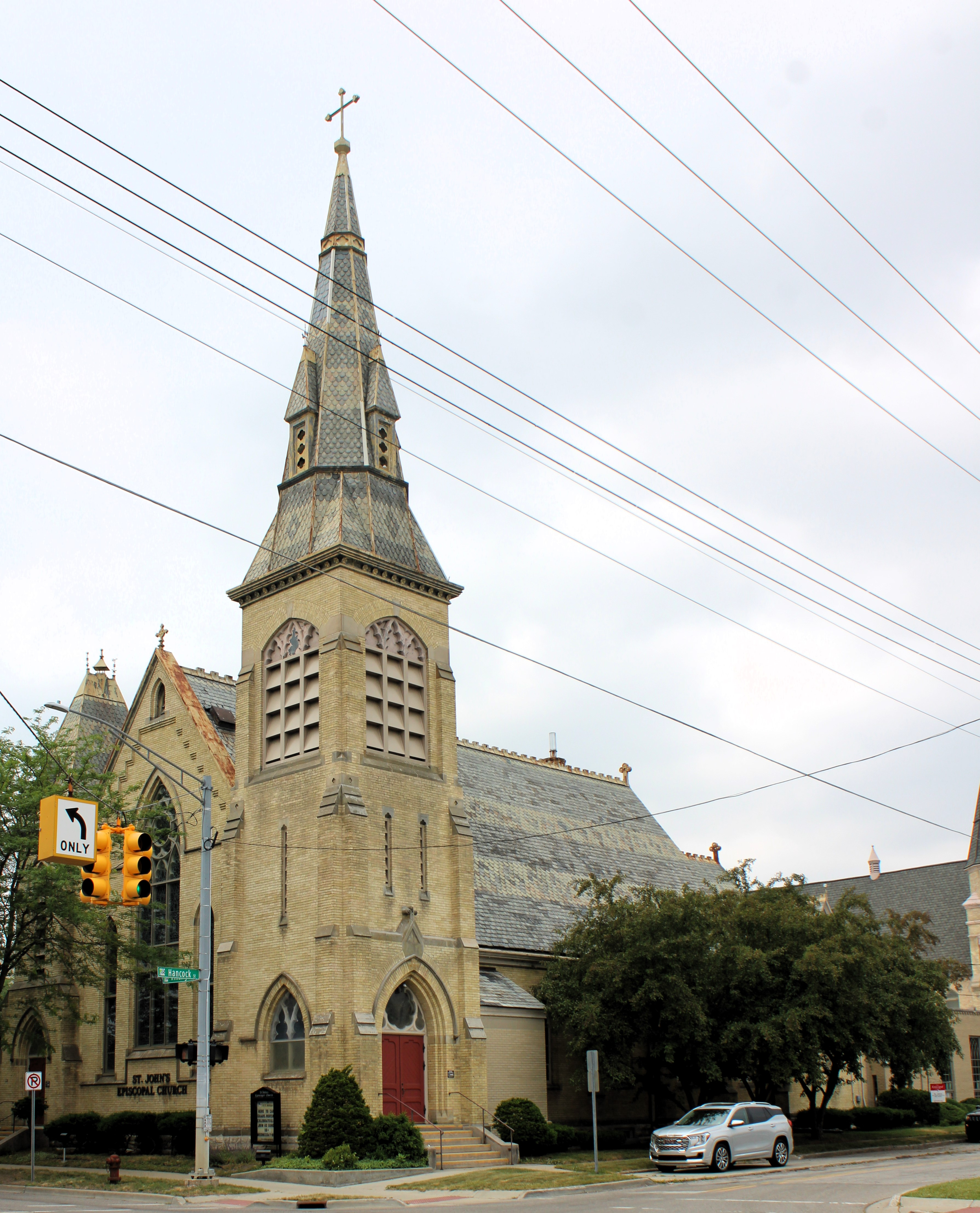
- St. John's Episcopal in 2023

- Location within Michigan Location within the United States
- Interactive map
- Location: 123 N. Michigan, Saginaw, Michigan
- Coordinates: 43°25′6″N 83°57′51″W
- Area: 1 acre (0.40 ha)
- Built: 1883
- Architect: Gordon W. Lloyd
- Architectural style: High Victorian Gothic
- MPS: Center Saginaw MRA
- NRHP reference No.: 82002879
- Added to NRHP: July 9, 1982

St. John's Episcopal Church is a historic church in Saginaw, Michigan. It was listed on the National Register of Historic Places in 1982.

== History ==
St. John's Episcopal Church was established in 1851. The original congregation met at the courthouse until 1853, when they constructed a small church, located near where the present structure is now located. By the 1880s, the church membership had outstripped the capacity of this building. In 1883, the congregation hired architect Gordon W. Lloyd to design a new building, and the cornerstone of the present church was laid. When the new building was finished, the church bell from the old building was installed in the new church. In 1887 and 1888, the congregation constructed a parish house and rectory at the site of the original 1853 building.

== Description ==
St. John's Episcopal Church is a High Victorian Gothic structure made of yellow brick. The steeply pitched gable roof is clad with grey and yellow slate, and the windows make extensive use of stained glass. Two towers, a lower squared one and a teller hexagonally roofed one, balance the facade. Additional exterior moldings, tracery, and carvings provide details to the facade. Porticoes, buttresses, and gothic arched windows give the church a Gothic look.
