= South Jefferson Avenue Historic District =

- U.S. National Register of Historic Places
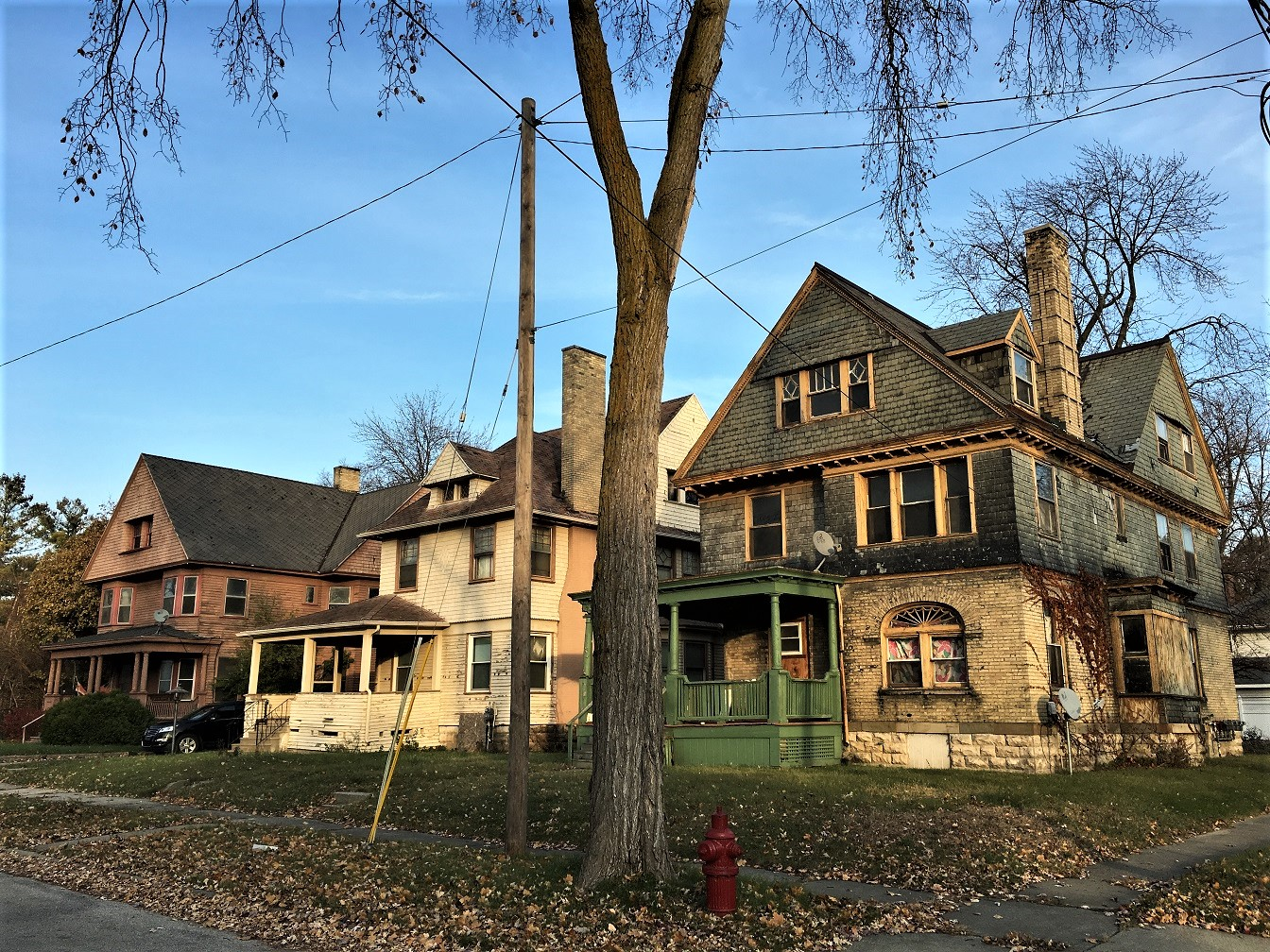
- Interactive map
- Location: roughly bounded by Meredith, High, Owen, Phelon, Campbell, and Sheridan, Saginaw, Michigan
- Coordinates: 43°25′02″N 83°56′28″W
- Area: 37 acres (15 ha)
- Architect: Multiple
- Architectural style: Colonial Revival, Prairie School, Late Victorian
- MPS: Center Saginaw MRA
- NRHP reference No.: 82002877
- Added to NRHP: July 9, 1982

The South Jefferson Avenue Historic District is a residential historic district located along South Jefferson between Meredith and East Holland, and along East Remington and East Holland between Jefferson and Sheridan in Saginaw, Michigan. It was listed on the National Register of Historic Places in 1982.

== History ==
In 1893, a major fire destroyed over 250 structures in this area. Residents rebuilt after the fire, resulting in a neighborhood where most of the houses date from the 1890s and early 20th century. These houses were fashionable, representing well-off families of Saginaw's business and professional classes.

== Description ==
The South Jefferson Avenue Historic District contains 130 structures, of which 121 contribute to the historic character of the neighborhood. Most of these structures date from after the 1893, with only a handful along Holland and Remington Streets pre-dating the 1893 fire. The homes are large and are predominantly Queen Anne and Eastlake styles. Other architectural styles are intermixed, including Italianate, Colonial Revival, Prairie School, Dutch Revival, Chateauesque, Bungaloid, and Mediterranean.

Significant structures in the district include:

- Charles Sommers House (614 E. Holland): This house was originally built in 1865, but was substantially altered after 1900 by Charles Sommers to reflect Classical and Prairie influences. Sommers organized the Sommers Match Company in 1903 with his brother.
- Henry Passolt House (1105 S. Jefferson): The Passolt House was built in 1868 by Henry Passolt, a Saginaw soap manufacturer. The architect was Ludwig Bode, who designed this house to be as fireproof as possible. The house is a two-story Italianate structure with double brick walls with a lead inner casing and wood floors laid over concrete.
- Oliver Morse House (708 East Holland): Oliver Morse built this structure in 1874, planning to use it either as a home or as an inn. The house was later sold to tavern owner William Gladsby, then to Lewis Cornwell, founder of the Saginaw Beef Company. It is a two-story Italianate structure.
- Martin Gale House (1415 Brown): This house was designed by Frederick Beckbissinger in 1912 for lumberman Martin Gale. It is of early Prairie School styling.
