= Saginaw News Building =

- U.S. National Register of Historic Places
- Interactive map
- Location: 203 S. Washington Ave., Saginaw, Michigan
- Coordinates: 43°25′54″N 83°56′25″W
- Area: less than one acre
- Built: 1958
- Built by: Spence Brothers
- Architect: Frantz & Spence
- Architectural style: International Style
- NRHP reference No.: 16000838
- Added to NRHP: December 13, 2016

The Saginaw News Building is an office building located at 203 South Washington Avenue in Saginaw, Michigan, formerly the headquarters of The Saginaw News. It was listed on the National Register of Historic Places in 2016.

== History ==
In 1859, The East Saginaw Courier began publication, and in 1881 it was joined by the Saginaw Evening News. In 1910, a group of investors led by George Gough Booth and his brother Ralph purchased the News, and in 1918 added the Courier (by then the Courier-Herald). The Booths consolidated the two papers into the Saginaw News Courier, which was renamed the Saginaw Daily News in 1927 and The Saginaw News in 1936. The paper operated out of a building located at the comer of Federal Avenue and South Washington Avenue. By the late 1950s, The Saginaw News had outgrown this building, and they hired Saginaw architects Frantz & Spence to design a new structure, located next door to their previous quarters. Ground was broken in 1958, and the new building was completed in 1960, after which the old headquarters was demolished.

The building served as the headquarters for The Saginaw News for fifty years. In 2009, the newspaper reduced its daily publishing schedule to a three issues a week, and the printing was outsourced to another Booth-owned publishing company. No longer needing the space, in 2010 the News moved operations out of the 203 South Washington Avenue facility. The building was sold to an LLC in 2012, and resold to SVRC Industries at the end of 2014. In 2016, SVRC began renovations to turn the building into a farm market. The market opened in 2018.

== Description ==
The Saginaw News Building is a three-story, steel frame International Style building on a poured concrete foundation. The exterior facades are aluminum trimmed curtain walls, with windows located in horizontal bands between bands of ceramic coated light green steel paneling. The main facade has a projecting flat-topped entry section. In front of the entry is an asymmetrical concrete plaza containing granite capped landscaping beds.
