= Bearinger Building =

- U.S. National Register of Historic Places
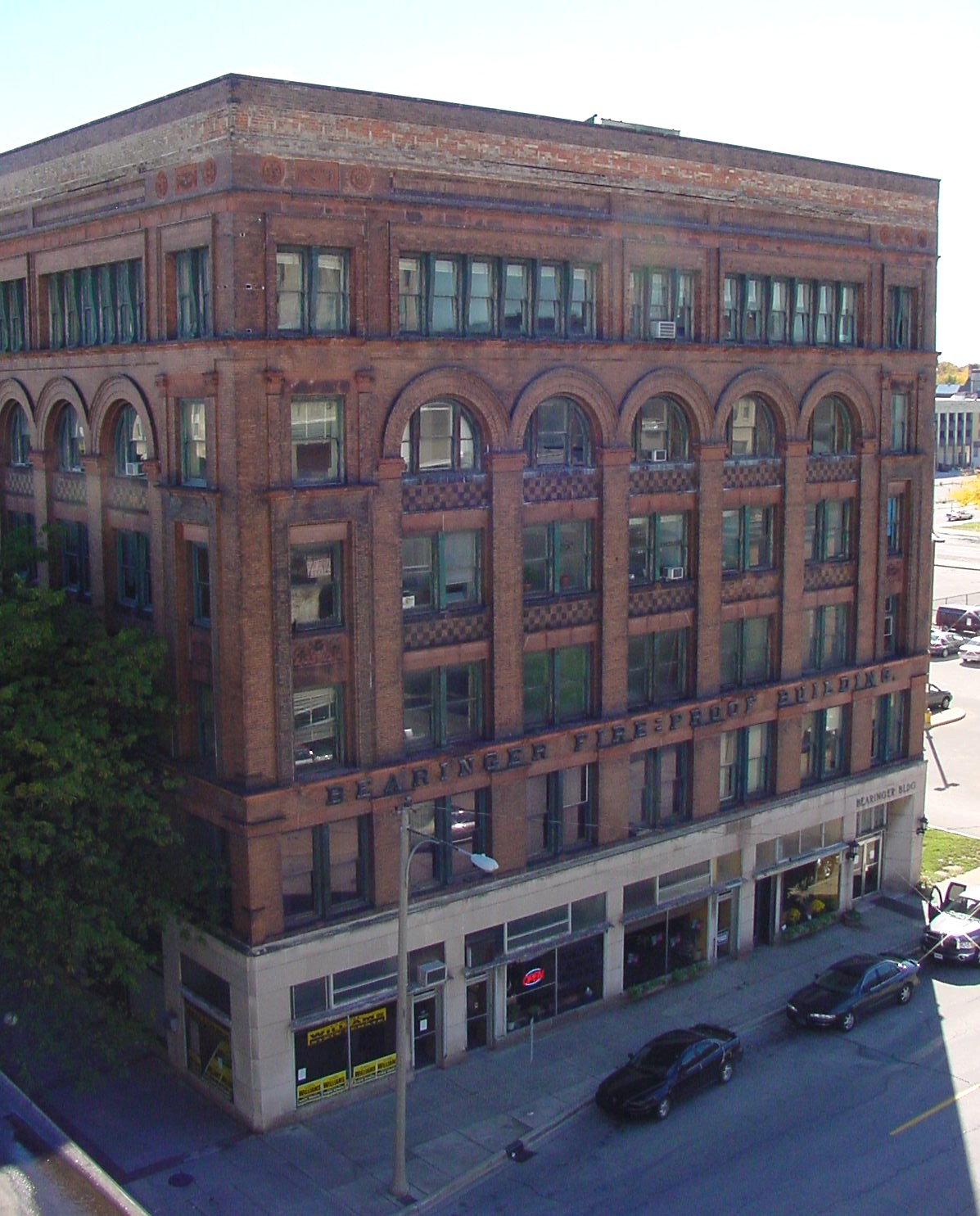
- Interactive map
- Location: 124 N. Franklin, Saginaw, Michigan
- Coordinates: 43°26′2″N 83°56′14″W
- Area: less than one acre
- Built: 1893
- Architect: W.T. Cooper & Frederick Beckbissinger
- Architectural style: Chicago
- MPS: Center Saginaw MRA
- NRHP reference No.: 82002861
- Added to NRHP: July 9, 1982

The Bearinger Building is a commercial building located at 124 North Franklin Street in Saginaw, Michigan. It was listed on the National Register of Historic Places in 1982.

== History ==
Isaac Bearinger was born in Ontario, and as a young man came to Michigan to work in the lumber industry. He began as a cook's helper, rose through the ranks, and finally engaged in a partnership to log timberlands. His logging interests eventually spread over multiple states and into Canada, and Bearinger amassed a considerable fortune. With his wealth, he organized several businesses in Saginaw, including the American Commercial and Savings Bank, the Saginaw Brick Paving Company, and the Union Park Racetrack. In 1893, he constructed the first fireproof building on the east side of Saginaw, the Bearinger Fireproof Building, designed by Saginaw architects W. T. Cooper and Frederick Beckbissinger. The building held stores on the first floor and offices above.

Isaac Bearinger continued to own the building until his death in 1904, after which his son, James I. Bearinger, inherited the building. James Bearinger died in 1957, and the building was transferred to his family, who sold it to Detroit lawyers James O. Thompson and Irving A. August in 1972. The building was sold again in 1979, and again in 2002. The building was vacated in 2008, and resold multiple times afterward until it was foreclosed on in 2013. In 2015, it was purchased by the Saginaw Economic Development Corporation. In the summer of 2022 the building was purchased from the SEDC by the city of Saginaw.

== Description ==
The Bearinger Building is a six-story Chicago-inspired building constructed of brick and steel, and is faced with red brick. Five arches run across the facade from the second to the fifth floor. The sixth floor has ribbon windows, above which there was once a decorative cornice. A limestone facing has been placed over the first floor.

== Gallery ==
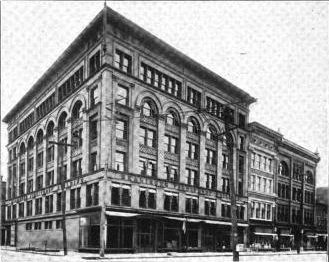
Bearinger Building, 1917

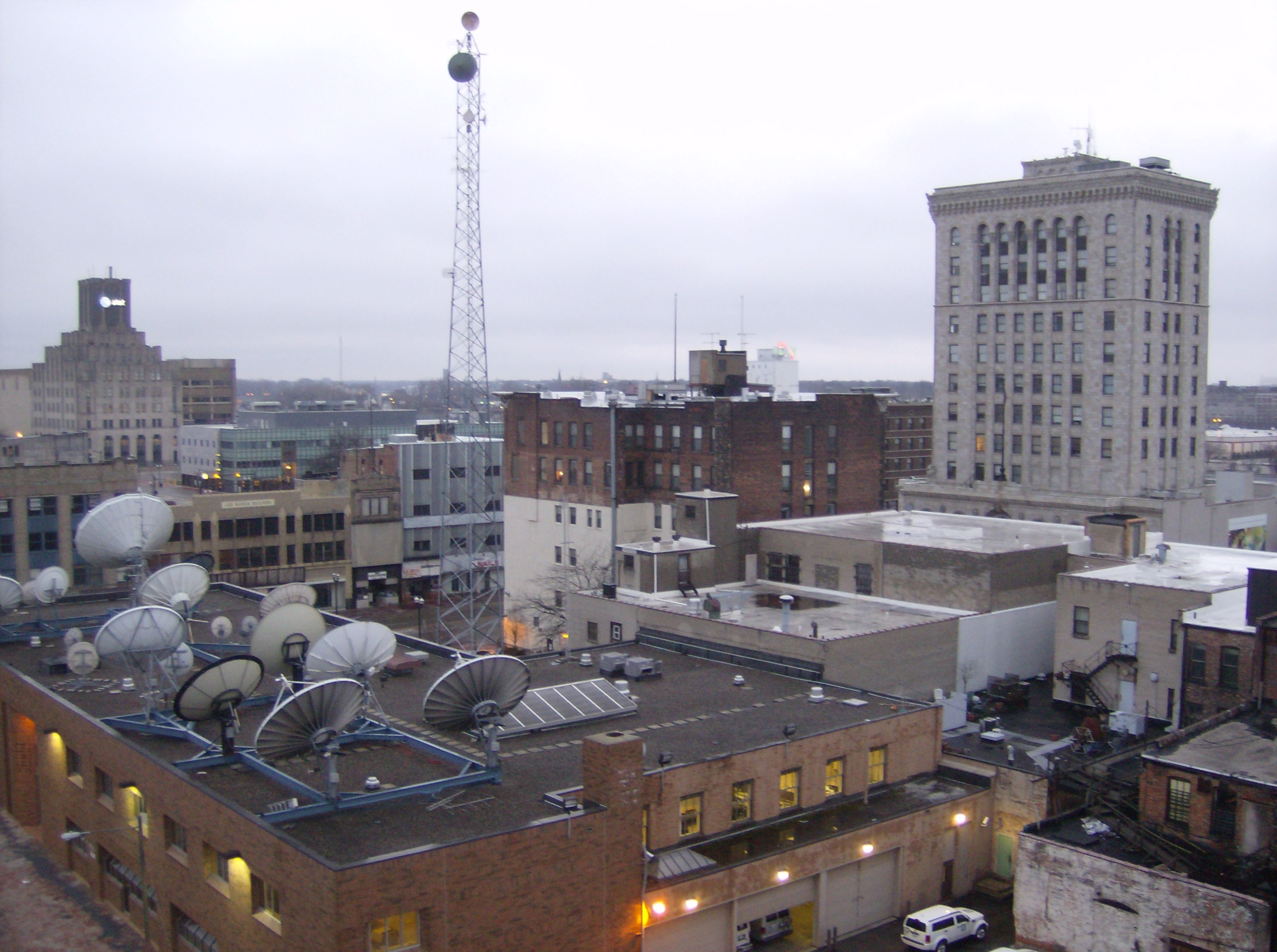
Saginaw, MI skyline as seen from the Bearinger Building
