= Charles Peters Sr. House =

- U.S. National Register of Historic Places
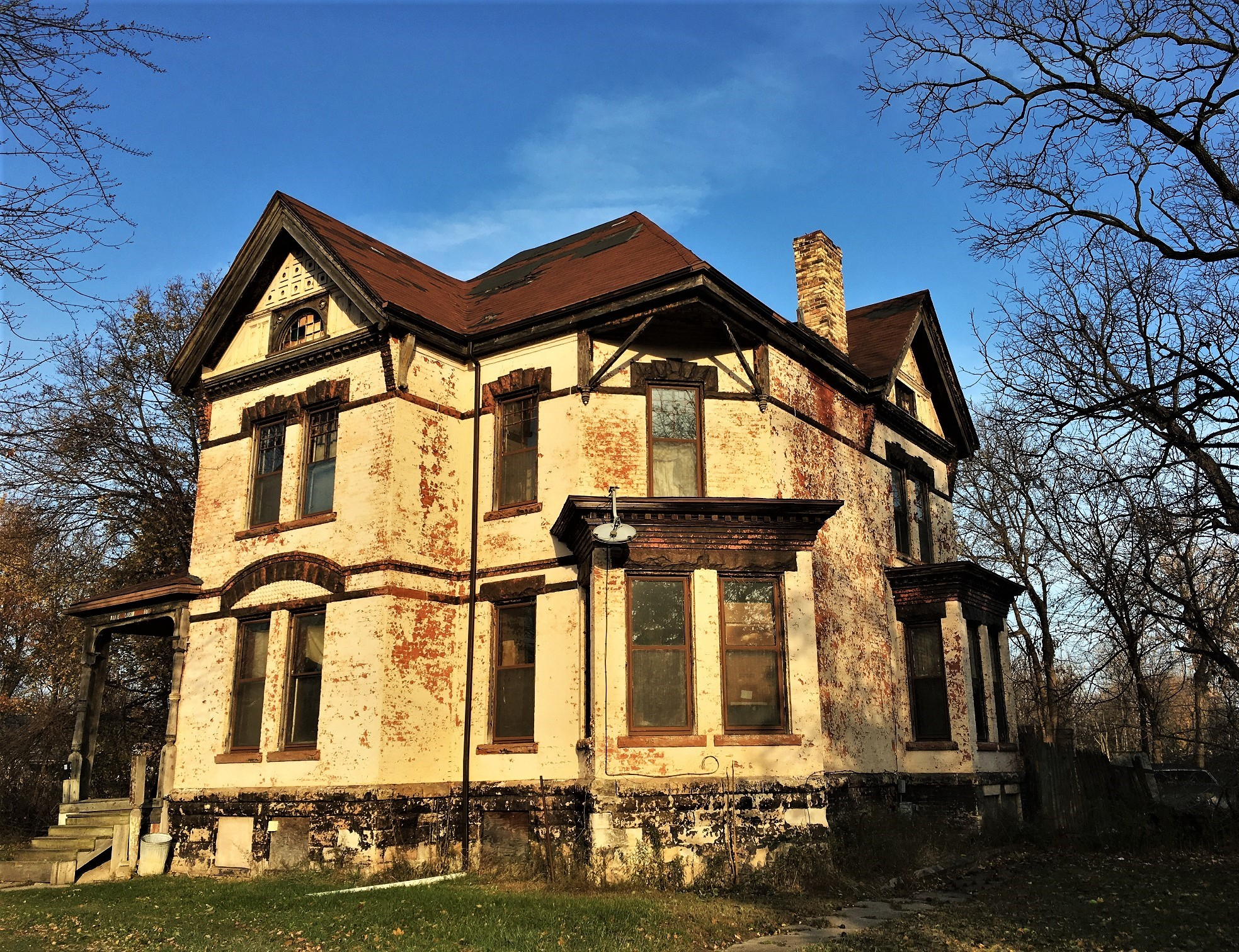
- Interactive map
- Location: 130 N. 6th, Saginaw, Michigan
- Coordinates: 43°25′58″N 83°55′34″W
- Area: less than one acre
- Built: 1884
- Architect: Franklin Boergeort
- Architectural style: Queen Anne
- MPS: Center Saginaw MRA
- NRHP reference No.: 82002873
- Added to NRHP: July 9, 1982

The Charles Peters Sr. House is a single family home located at 130 North 6th Street in Saginaw, Michigan. It was listed on the National Register of Historic Places in 1982. The house is missing and presumed demolished.

== History ==
Charles Peters arrived with his family in Saginaw in 1853, when he was still an infant. He apprenticed to a printer at the age of twelve and stayed until the outbreak of the Civil War, when he enlisted. He returned to the printing business after the war, and in 1879 started the firm of Seeman and Peters Printing with Joseph Seeman. In 1881 Seeman and Peters published the first edition of the Saginaw Evening News (which eventually became The Saginaw News). Peters quickly built the News into an influential paper. Peters was also active in the region's fur trade, experimented in sugar beet sugar production and marketing, and helped to finance various other business ventures in the Saginaw area.

In 1884, Peters hired architect Franklin Boergeort to design a new home on Sixth Street. He lived there until his death in 1910.

== Description ==
The Charles Peters Sr. House was a two-story Queen Anne structure covered with clapboard, with intersecting gable roofs having swept eaves. It was large, with asymmetrical massing and a variety of window shapes and sizes. The front facade had a wrap-around porch, along with balanced window placement and a Palladian window in the front gable end.
