= West Side Historic Residential District =

- U.S. National Register of Historic Places
- Interactive map
- Location: Roughly bounded by Mason, Madison, Harrison and Lyon Sts., Saginaw, Michigan
- Coordinates: 43°25′13″N 83°58′06″W
- Area: 91.7 acres (37.1 ha)
- Architect: Multiple
- Architectural style: Classical Revival, Italianate, Queen Anne
- MPS: Center Saginaw MRA
- NRHP reference No.: 82002881
- Added to NRHP: July 9, 1982

The West Side Historic Residential District is a residential historic district roughly bounded by Mason, Madison, Harrison and Lyon Streets in Saginaw, Michigan. It was listed on the National Register of Historic Places in 1982.

== History ==
The West Side Historic Residential District grew up around the location of Fort Saginaw, and the commercial district arising in that area. A few houses were in place by 1850, with another 40 or so added by 1870. Most of the development in the neighborhood occurred between 1870 and 1890, with some additional construction after the turn of the century. The neighborhood contains both larger and smaller houses intermixed; although the original residents were all well-to-do, the very wealthy lumber and land barons lived right next to more modest professionals and craftsmen.

== Description ==
The West Side Historic Residential District contains 349 structures, of which 325 contribute to the historic character of the neighborhood. Nearly all the structures are houses, with only three commercial structures and two churches included. The homes range from simple to ornate, and include Italianate, Queen Anne, and Classical Revival, and Greek Revival residences.

Significant structures in the district include:

- George Bullock House (213 South Granger): This house was built in 1858 for George Bullock, the second mayor of Saginaw City. Bullock died in 1861 and the home was sold to C.T. Brenner, the owner of the Shakespeare Hotel. The house is a vernacular Italianate structure.
- 821 Ames: The house was built in 1867, and is a modest two-story Italianate house.
- Charles Bauer House (1021 Court): This house was built in 1893 for Charles Bauer, a son of Peter Bauer, a grocer, mason, clothier, and co-founder of Bauer Brothers Clothing. The house is a fine three-story Queen Anne structure.
- John Stenglein House (803 Adams): This house was built in 1894 for John Stenglein. who owned Saginaw Showcase Company, a retail furniture business. Stenglein first constructed a house at this location in 1854. In 1894 he moved that house to the lot next door (now 809 Adams) and constructed this house in its place. The house is a transitional architectural style, incorporating elements from both Queen Anne and Georgian Revival Styles. It is a three-story frame structure.
- Edgar Church House (1008 Hancock): This house was built in 1895 for industrialist Edgar Church. It is a large Queen Anne house with brick on the first story, narrow clapboarding on the second story, and fish scale shingling in the gable ends above.
- Clarence Brand House (129 South Granger): This house was built in 1916 for Clarence Brand, the president of the Brand and Hardin Milling Company. Brand had purchased the house originally at this location, built in 1877, and in 1916 razed it to construct this house. It is a two-and-one-half story Georgian Revival-style home.
- 715 Court: This house was constructed in 1924, and is a fine example of Prairie School building with overhanging eaves, horizontal massing, a low hipped roof, and a stucco exterior.
