= Mahoney Site =

Archaeological site in Michigan, United States

- Mahoney Site (20SA193)
- U.S. National Register of Historic Places
- Location within Michigan Location within the United States
- Location: Address Restricted, near St. Charles, Michigan
- Coordinates: 43°16′00″N 84°07′30″W
- Area: 14 acres (5.7 ha)
- NRHP reference No.: 82000545
- Added to NRHP: October 29, 1982

The Mahoney Site, designated 20SA193, is an archaeological site located near Bridgeport, Michigan, United States. It was listed on the National Register of Historic Places in 1982.

The site was a Woodland period fall and winter camp.

In 1963, human remains representing at least two individuals were removed from site by archaeologists from the University of Michigan Museum of Anthropological Archaeology.
