= North Michigan Avenue Historic District =

- U.S. National Register of Historic Places
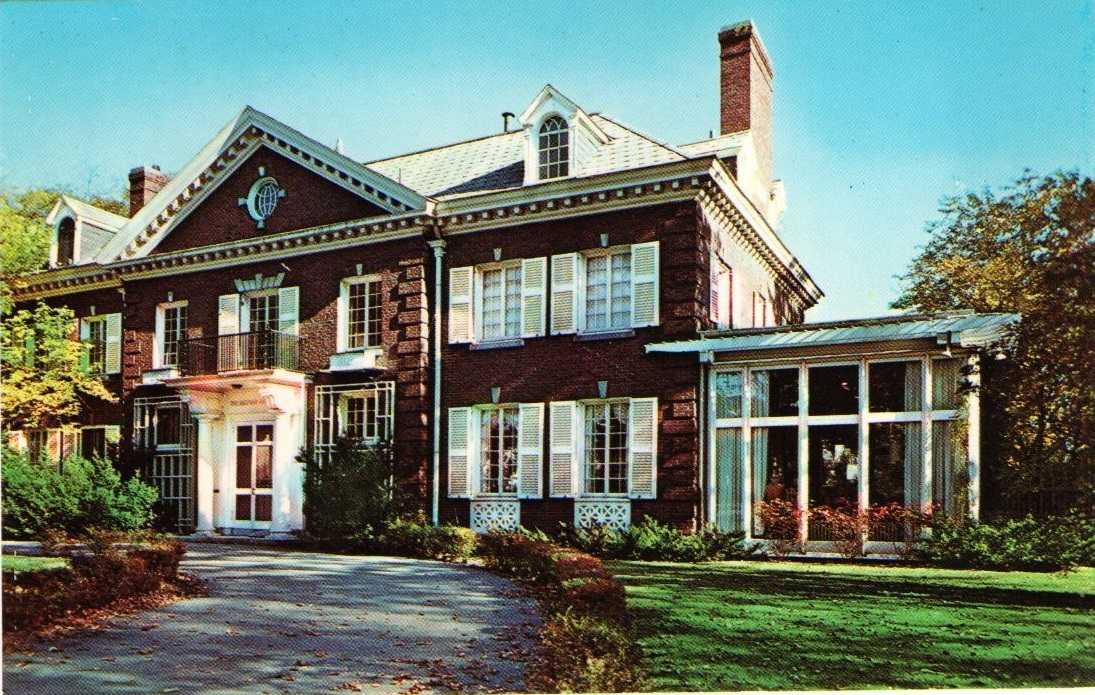
- Saginaw Museum (Ring House)
- Interactive map
- Location: Roughly bounded by Monroe, Fayette, N. Hamilton and W. Remington Sts., Saginaw, Michigan
- Coordinates: 43°25′21″N 83°57′24″W
- Area: 25.7 acres (10.4 ha)
- Architectural style: Colonial Revival, Queen Anne, Romanesque Revival
- MPS: Center Saginaw MRA
- NRHP reference No.: 82002872
- Added to NRHP: July 9, 1982

The North Michigan Avenue Historic District is a residential historic district located along Michigan Avenue, from Monroe Street on the south to just north of Remington Street in Saginaw, Michigan. It was listed on the National Register of Historic Places in 1982.

== History ==
The earliest settlers in Saginaw built homes along the southern portion of Michigan Avenue. It wasn't until the 1860s that development began on the northern portion of Michigan Avenue; however, this development quickly accelerated into the 1880s. The residential section along Michigan Avenue attracted sons and relatives of the wealthy families that had settled earlier on the southern part of the Avenue. Through the nineteenth century, large, stately mansions were constructed along this section of Michigan Avenue. After the turn of the century, some of the larger lots were split, and more modest bungalows were constructed, infilling between the larger homes. Many of the larger homes have been converted to commercial use.

== Description ==
The district contains 33 structures. of which 27 contribute to the historic character of the neighborhood. The contributing structures primarily dates from the 1880s and the 1910s, and range in style from Colonial Revival to Queen Anne to Romanesque Revival. The district is anchored on the southern end by St. Andrews Catholic Church. Many of the other structures on the southern blocks are Victorian houses. Toward the northern section of the district, the houses tend to be newer, many from the twentieth century. This includes the Ring House, now the Saginaw Art Museum, which anchors the district on the northern end.

The significant structures in the district include:

- Hannon House (727 North Michigan): The Hannon House is a two-story Greek Revival structure. It was constructed in the early 1850s at the corner of Michigan and Hancock Streets. Charles Rust later purchased the structure and moved it to the 500 block of South Michigan, and then in 1911 it was moved to the 700 block of North Michigan.
- Benton Hanchett House (1006 North Michigan): Benton Hanchett was a lawyer who built a successful practice living on South Michigan. In 18881, he built a fine house on North Michigan. The house is a three-story yellow-brick Romanesque Revival structure with red sandstone trim.
- Gilbert Stark House (1027 North Michigan): This house was built in 1885 for Gilbert Stark, a lumberman and son of Saginaw lawyer and mayor George Stark. It is a Queen Anne structure with asymmetrical massing, variety of window sizes and shapes, broken planar surfaces, and a picturesque roofline.
- Charles Ring House (1126 North Michigan): This house was built in 1904 for Charles Ring, a wealthy lumberman. It is a three-story, brick Georgian Revival residence. In 1946, Ring's daughters gave the house and gardens to the City, and it now houses the Saginaw Art Museum.
