= Passolt House =

- U.S. National Register of Historic Places
- Michigan State Historic Site
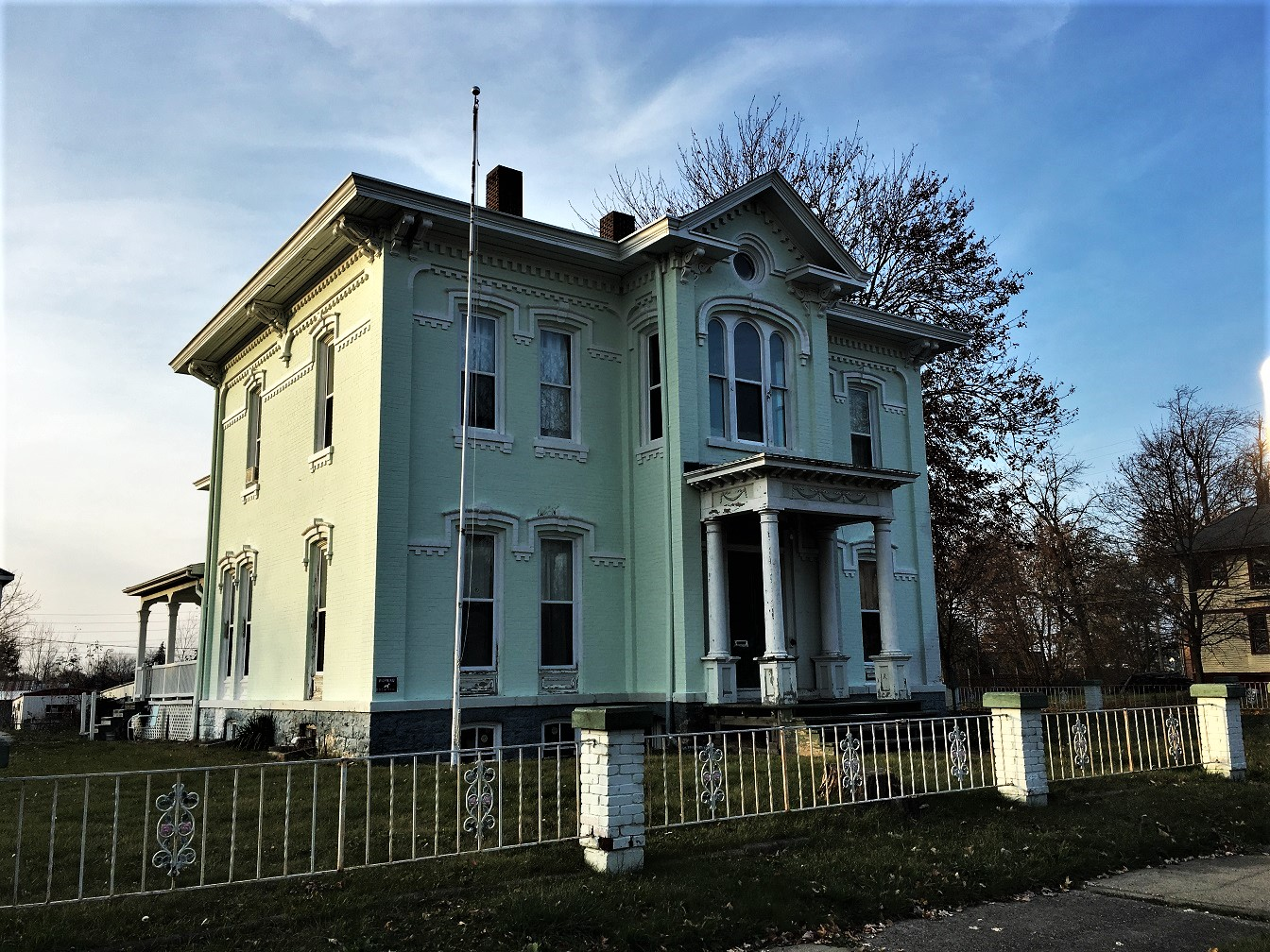
- Interactive map
- Location: 1105 S. Jefferson Ave., Saginaw, Michigan
- Coordinates: 43°25′15″N 83°56′27″W
- Area: 4 acres (1.6 ha)
- Built: 1877
- Architect: Ludwig E. Bude
- NRHP reference No.: 72000653
- Added to NRHP: October 18, 1972

The Passolt House is a single-family home located at 1105 South Jefferson Avenue in Saginaw, Michigan. It was listed on the National Register of Historic Places in 1972.

== History ==
Henry Passolt was born in Hirschberg, Germany in 1836. He arrived in Detroit in 1854, and worked in the soap manufacturing business. In 1863, he moved to Saginaw, where he began to manufacture Atlas soap, used for laundry. His original 1863 factory (destroyed in 1893) was constructed on a parcel of land near where this house now stands. In 1877, Passolt hired local architect Ludwig E. Bude to design this house. Passolt lived in the house until his death, after which the house was owned by his heirs for a number of years. When they sold it, it was converted to apartments for several years. In 1948, it was converted to use as a business and then adopted for business, and occupied by an advertising agency until 1965. The Saginaw Historical Society purchased the mansion in 1966, and was opened as a museum.

== Description ==
The Passolt House is a two-story brick structure on a stone foundation. The home was designed to be fireproof, and has wood floors laid over concrete. The middle section of the front facade protrudes eight feet and contains a double set of entry doors. The house was originally fronted by a full-width porch; this was replaced by a four-pillared smaller porch. The house contains fourteen rooms, including two parlors, a dining room, library, kitchen, and bedroom on the first floor.
