= Bliss Park =

- U.S. National Register of Historic Places
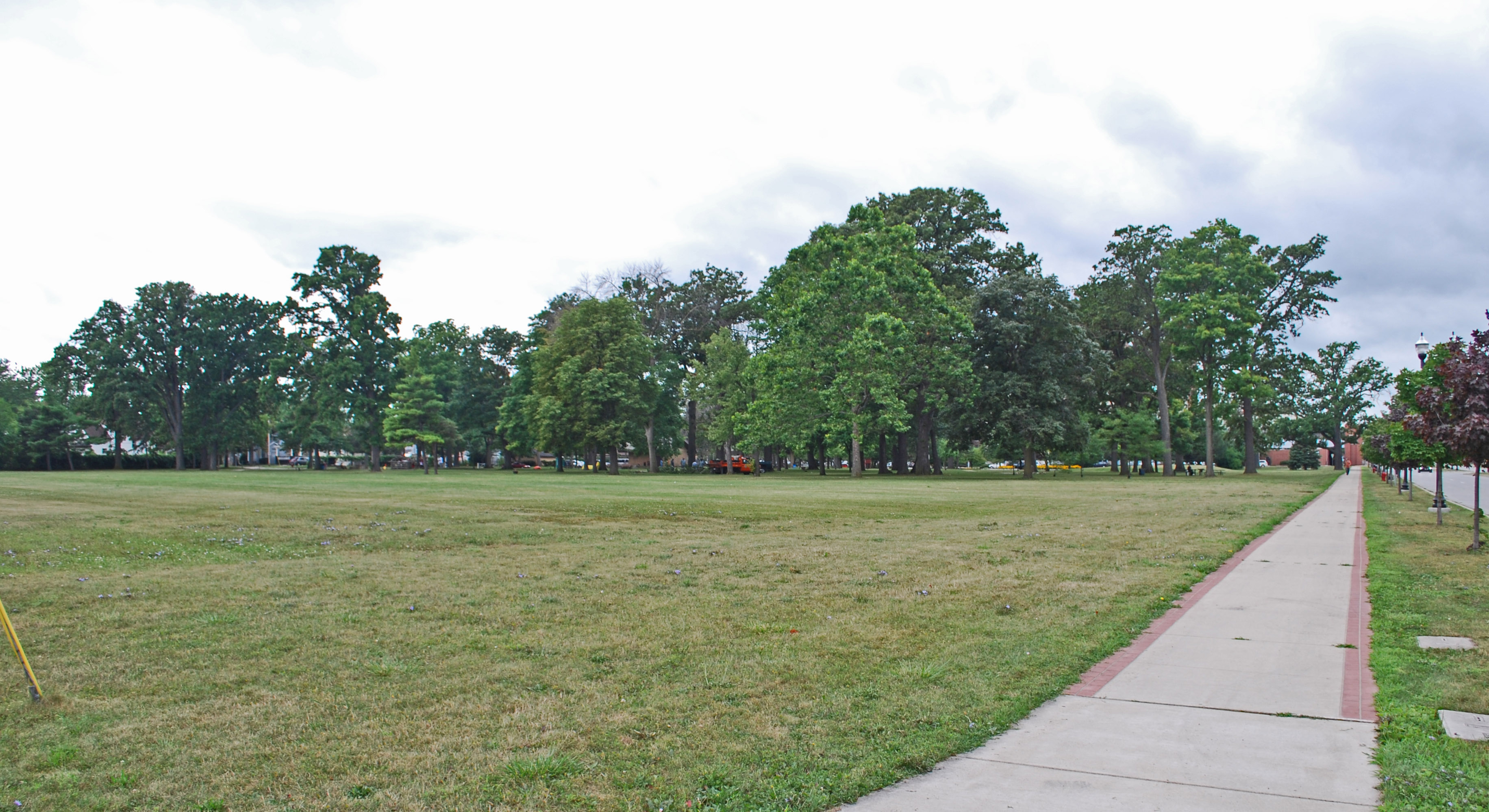
- Interactive map
- Location: SW of jct. of Houghton St. and N. Michigan Ave., Saginaw, Michigan
- Coordinates: 43°25′42″N 83°57′13″W
- Area: 13 acres (5.3 ha)
- Built: 1903
- Architect: Cottage Gardens Company Inc.; WPA
- NRHP reference No.: 95001424
- Added to NRHP: December 7, 1995

Bliss Park is a park located at the southwest corner of Houghton Street and North Michigan Avenue in Saginaw, Michigan. It was listed on the National Register of Historic Places in 1995.

== History ==
The section of land where Bliss Park is now located was once part of a tract owned by Louis Campau, the first white settler in the area. Campau purchased it in 1822, but in 1826 left the area to become one of the founders of Grand Rapids, Michigan. The property remained in the Campau family and undeveloped for some 80 years. The property became an unofficial common ground for residents of Saginaw, and was used for recreation and other purposes. Notably, it was used during the Civil War as a drilling ground for the 29th Michigan Volunteer Infantry Regiment, and for various Civil War reunions afterward.

In 1903, Aaron T. Bliss (then governor of Michigan) purchased the land for this park from the Campau family and donated it to the city of Saginaw. In 1904, the Saginaw Board of Public Works hired landscape gardener E. C. Foster of Kalamazoo, Michigan to design the landscaping for the park. However, those plans were deemed unsuitable, and in 1906 the newly created Board of Park and Cemetery Commissioners hired Cottage Gardens Company, Inc., of Queens, New York to complete plans. The company created an open plan that retained many of the natural features that Saginaw residents valued. Much of this plan was implemented that year, with more the next. In the first few years of the 1910s, monuments were placed in the park.

In the 1930s, Bliss Park was significantly renovated with assistance from the Work Projects Administration. Renovations included a new shelter house, parking lot, and changes to the landscaping. Bliss Park remained in use through the rest of the century without major changes.

== Description ==
Bliss Park is a small trapezoidal park, covering about 13 acres. It consists of five distinct areas: a broad open recreation ground, a smaller open playfield, a wooded picnic grove, a ceremonial garden/plaza area, and a parking area. The recreation ground and playfield are open areas lined with trees. The picnic area covers much of the park surface, and has a number of large hardwood trees for shade. Monuments within the park provide focal points. The parking area is to the south, and a semicircular garden/plaza to the west. The plaza has small trees and flowers. The park lies across the street from one of Saginaw's main medical centers, Covenant HealthCare, providing a place for the hospital staff to relax in between shifts, and the hospital's heliport for the Survival Flight helicopter from the University of Michigan Medical Center in Ann Arbor.
