= Morseville Bridge =

- U.S. National Register of Historic Places
- Location within Michigan Location within the United States
- Interactive map
- Location: Burt Rd. at Flint River, Taymouth Township, Michigan
- Coordinates: 43°14′12″N 83°52′06″W
- Area: less than one acre
- Built by: Smith Bridge Co.
- Architectural style: Pratt through truss
- NRHP reference No.: 90000573
- Added to NRHP: April 5, 1990

The Morseville Bridge is a bridge which formerly carried Burt Road over the Flint River in Taymouth Township, Michigan. It was listed on the National Register of Historic Places in 1990. It is the oldest surviving highway bridge in Saginaw County.

== History ==
Taymouth Township, Michigan was established in 1842, and by the 1870s, what is now Burt Road was the major east–west road in the southern section of the township. In the 1870s and 1880s, the small villages of Taymouth and Morseville were established along Burt Road on opposite sides of the Flint River. At the time, there was reportedly a wooden bridge across the river at this site, but it was washed away in 1885. In 1885, the township commissioned the Smith Bridge Company (later the Toledo Bridge Company, and now part of the American Bridge Company) of Toledo, Ohio to construct a replacement bridge out of iron. The bridge was in use until about 2006, when a replacement bridge was constructed to the south.

== Description ==
The Morseville Bridge is located slightly north of the current location of Burt Road. The main span is a Pratt through truss structure, running 138 feet eight inches long and 16 feet wide. At each end, there is a steel stringer approach span twenty-nine feet four inches long. The iron Pratt truss span section has eight panels, with built-up posts, top and bottom chords, and transverse floor beams riveted together. The diagonal bracing is constructed of eyebars with pinned connections. The span is supported by steel caisson piers at one end and a concrete pier at the other. The deck of the bridge is made of steel grating, not original to the structure.
