= Benjamin Cushway House =

- U.S. National Register of Historic Places
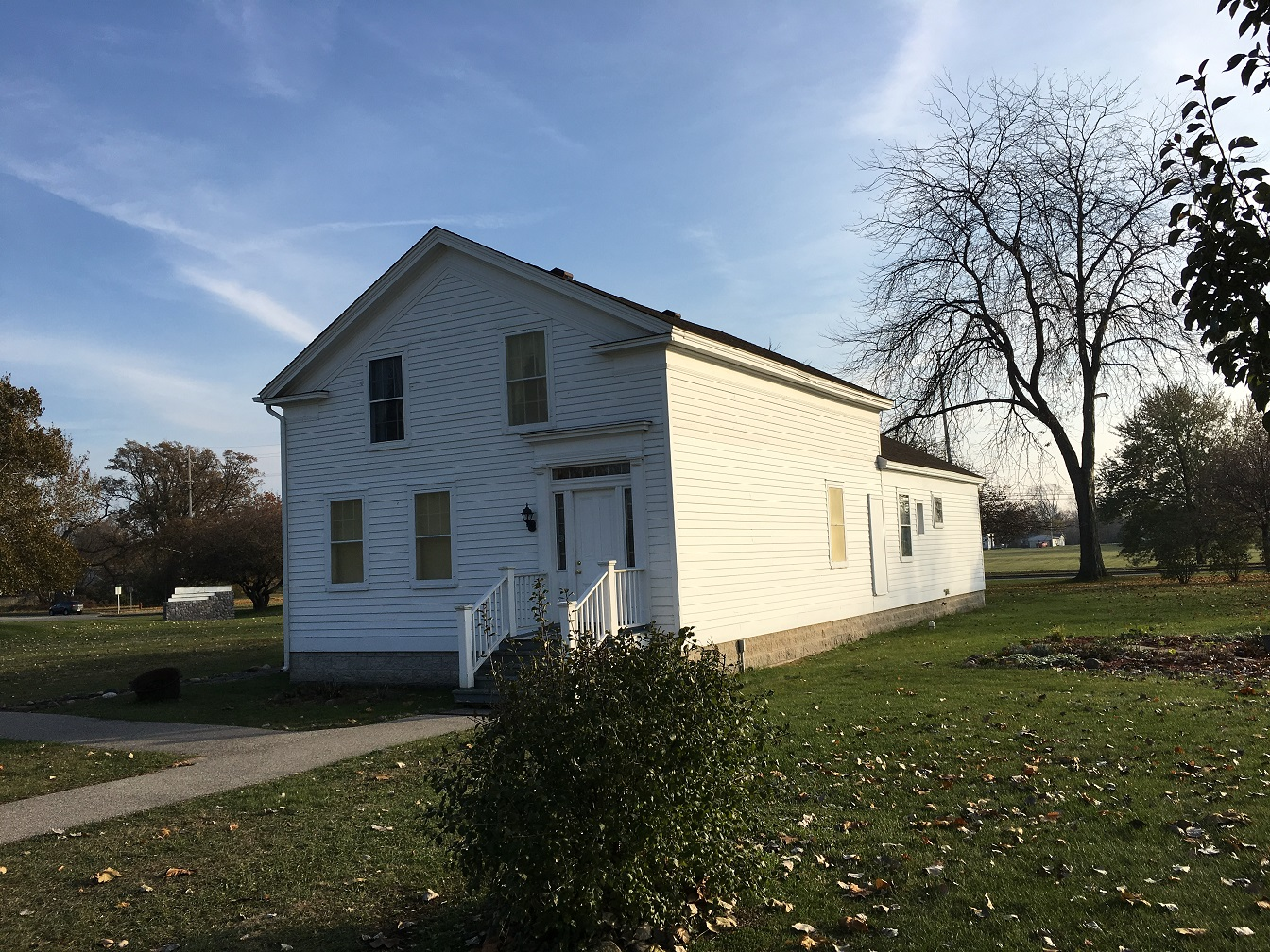
- Interactive map
- Location: Rust Ave. and Fordney St. Saginaw, Michigan
- Coordinates: 43°24′38″N 83°57′40″W
- Area: less than one acre
- Built: 1844
- Architectural style: Greek Revival
- MPS: Center Saginaw MRA
- NRHP reference No.: 82002865
- Added to NRHP: July 9, 1982

The Benjamin Cushway House is a single family home located near the corner of Rust Avenue and Fordney Street in Saginaw, Michigan. Built in 1844, it is the oldest surviving residence in Saginaw County. It was listed on the National Register of Historic Places in 1982.

== History ==
Benjamin Cushway, then still a boy, moved to Saginaw in 1810 with his family. He worked first on a farm and later trained as a blacksmith. In 1833, Benjamin married his wife, Adelaide. In 1844, Benjamin and Adelaide Cushway constructed this house at what is now the corner of Court and Hamilton Street. The site was located within the remains of the abandoned Fort Saginaw. In 1848, the Cushways moved onto a farm, and in 1850 sold the house to Jacob Voght, a grocer and farmer. In 1869, Fort Saginaw was razed, and the Cuchway House was moved to 1404 South Fayette. After the turn of the century, the house was purchased by the Nacarato Family, who owned it at least until the 1980s. It was moved again to its current location in 2001.

== Description ==
The Cushway House is built of hand-axed timbers. It is a Greek Revival structure with return eaves and a moderately pitched gable roof.
