= Central Warehouse (Saginaw, Michigan) =

- U.S. National Register of Historic Places
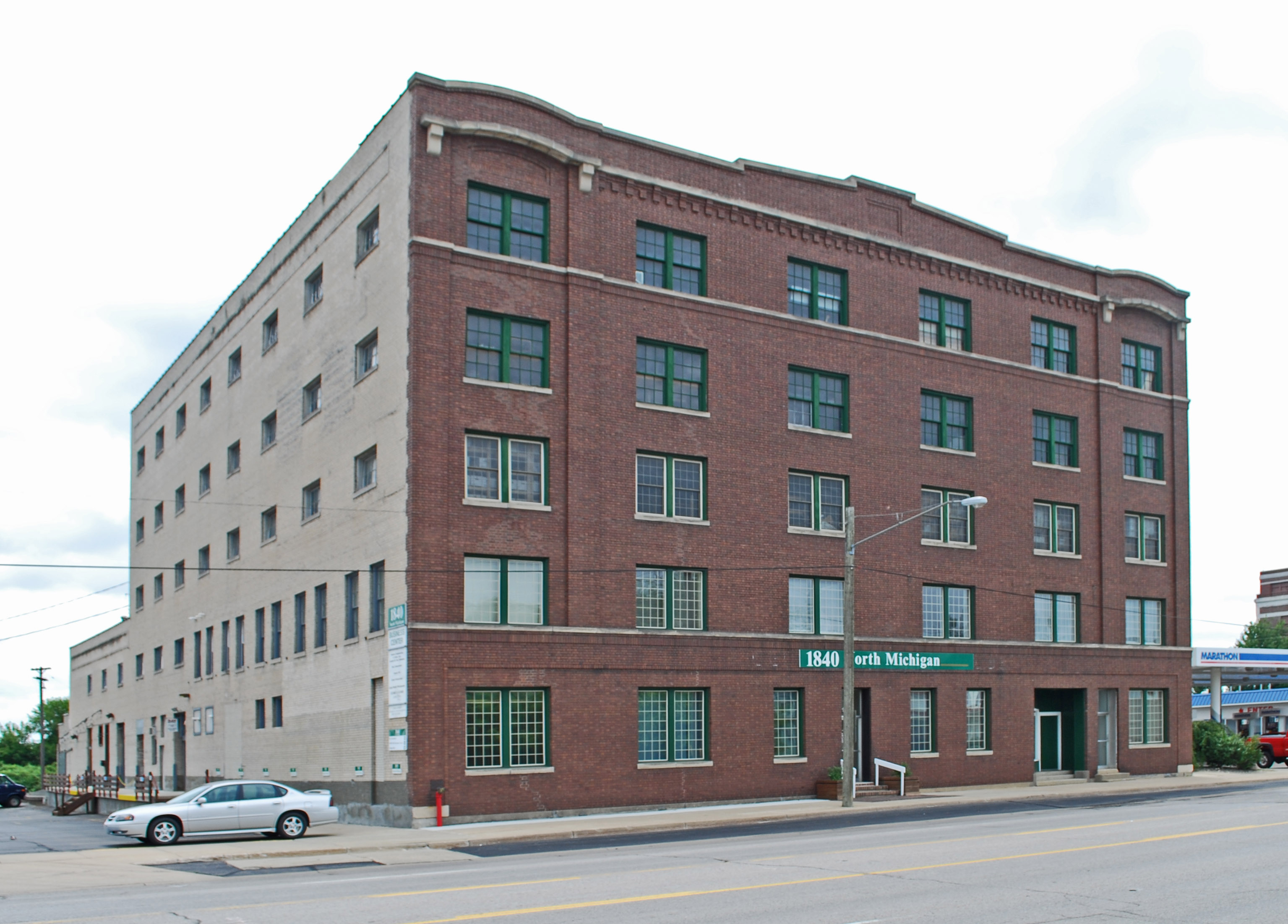
- Interactive map
- Location: 1800 N. Michigan, Saginaw, Michigan
- Coordinates: 43°26′01″N 83°56′57″W
- Area: 1 acre (0.40 ha)
- Built: 1913
- Built by: Spence Bros., et al.
- Architect: Frederick Beckbissinger
- Architectural style: Chicago
- MPS: Center Saginaw MRA
- NRHP reference No.: 82002864
- Added to NRHP: July 9, 1982

The Central Warehouse is a warehouse located at 1800 North Michigan in Saginaw, Michigan. It was listed on the National Register of Historic Places in 1982.

== History ==
The Central Warehouse Company was organized in 1910 by William Carr, a local feed and grain dealer, and ten other businessmen from within the community. The company hired local architect Frederick Beckbissinger to design a storage building. Several local firms were hired to provide materials for and construct the building, including Spence Brothers, who did the general contracting. Central Warehouse opened in 1913, with its first customers primarily firms related to the production and distribution of farm equipment. Two of the largest Central Warehouse customers were John Deere and International Harvester. International Harvester used the warehouse until the mid-1920s, while John Deere used it until the 1940s. The building continues to be used as a warehouse.

== Description ==
The Central Warehouse is a simple functional Chicago-style warehouse, constructed of brick with limestone string courses above the first and fourth floor levels. It has a dentilated limestone band course at its cornice and a stepped pediment at the roofline.
