= Bridgeport (disambiguation) =

Bridgeport is the most populous city in the U.S. state of Connecticut.

Bridgeport may also refer to:

== Places ==
=== Canada ===
- Bridgeport, Newfoundland and Labrador
- Bridgeport, Nova Scotia

=== United States ===
- Bridgeport, Alabama
- Bridgeport, California (disambiguation)
- Greater Bridgeport, the metropolitan area of the city of Bridgeport, Connecticut
- Bridgeport, Illinois
- Bridgeport, Chicago, a neighborhood of Chicago in Illinois
- Bridgeport Township, Lawrence County, Illinois
- Bridgeport, Harrison County, Indiana
- Bridgeport, Indianapolis, a neighbourhood of Indianapolis in Marion County, Indiana
- Bridgeport, Kansas
- Bridgeport, Kentucky
- Bridgeport, Michigan
- Bridgeport Charter Township, Michigan
- Bridgeport, Missouri
- Bridgeport, Nebraska
- Bridgeport, New Jersey
- Bridgeport, New York
- Bridgeport, Ohio
- Bridgeport, Union County, Ohio
- Bridgeport, Oklahoma
- Bridgeport, Pennsylvania
- Bridgeport, Tennessee
- Bridgeport, Texas
- Bridgeport, Utah
- Bridgeport, Virginia
- Bridgeport, Washington
- Bridgeport, West Virginia
- Bridgeport, Wisconsin, town
  - Bridgeport (community), Wisconsin

== Other uses ==
- Bridgeport (machine tool brand), a brand of milling machines and machining centers
  - Bridgeport, term referring generically to the style of knee mill popularized by the company
- BridgePort Brewing Company, based in Portland, Oregon
- Bridgeport Municipal Airport, in Wise County, Texas
- Bridgeport Music, a publishing company that owns the rights to some George Clinton and Funkadelic recordings
- Bridgeport rig, a type of quick-draw gun holster
- Bridgeport Subdivision, a railroad line in the U.S. state of West Virginia
- University of Bridgeport, in Connecticut
- USS Bridgeport, the name of three different ships of the United States Navy
- Bridgeport Village, a shopping mall in Oregon
- Bridgeport, a fictional city in The Sims 3: Late Night

== See also ==
- Bridgeport Bridge (disambiguation)
- Bridgeport High School (disambiguation)
- Bridgeport station (disambiguation), one of several train stations in the US and Canada
- Bridport (disambiguation)
