= Michigan's 95th House of Representatives district =

American legislative district

Michigan's 95th State House of Representatives district
Representative
Bill G. Schuette; R–Midland
- Demographics: 89.4% White; 1.2% Black; 3.3% Hispanic; 2% Asian; 0.2% Native American; 0.4% Other; 3.5% Multiracial
- Population (2024): 91,562

Michigan's 95th State House District is a Michigan legislative district currently located in part of Gladwin County and all of Midland County.

Michigan Voters passed 2018 Michigan Proposal 2 leading to a change in geographic area for the district. After the 2020 U.S. census, the District lines were redrawn from Saginaw to Midland, Michigan by the Citizens’ Nonpartisan Redistricting commission to cover Midland County and a small part of Gladwin county.

Previously, under the 2000 U.S. census, the 95th district was part of Saginaw County, and included the city of Saginaw, Buena Vista Township, Spaulding Township, and Bridgeport Township.

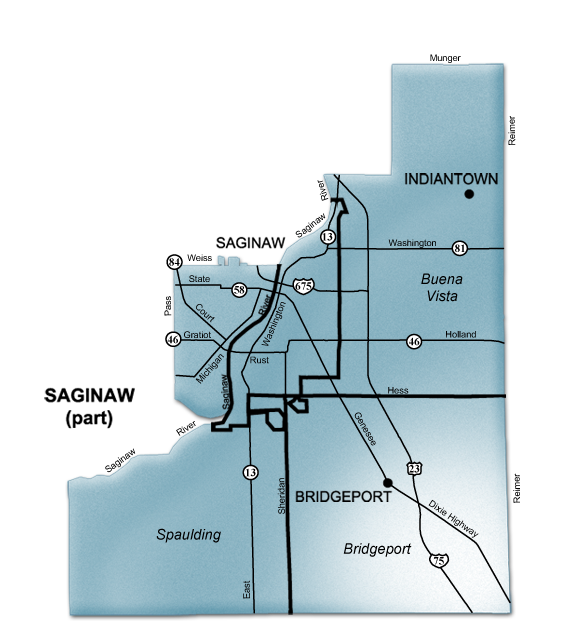
Michigan's 95th State House District included as part of the 2001 Apportionment Plan: The City of Saginaw, Buena Vista, Bridgeport and Spaulding Townships.

As a result of decennial legislative redistricting, proceeding the findings of the 2010 U.S. census, the district boundaries expanded to include Carrollton Township, James Township, Kochville Township, and the city of Zilwaukee and Zilwaukee Township. The district also retained its previous municipalities.

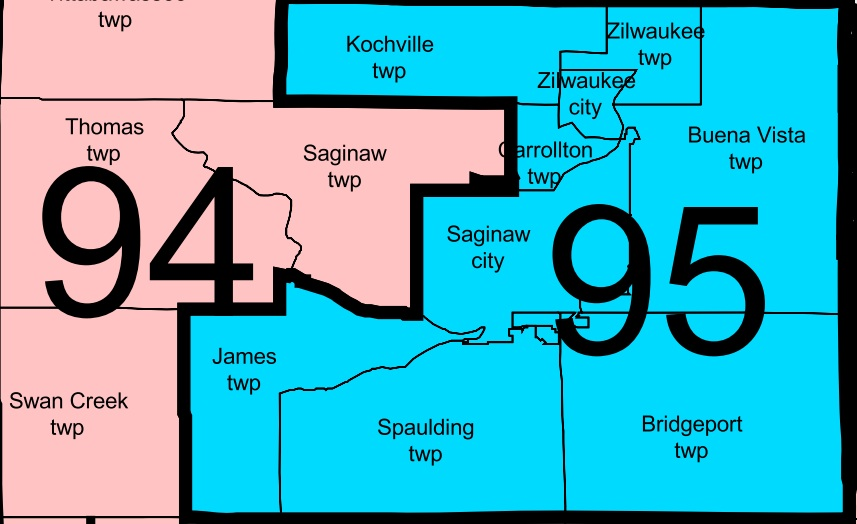
As a result of decennial redistricting, Michigan's 95th State House District included: The cities of Saginaw and Zilwaukee, Buena Vista, Bridgeport, Carrollton, James, Kochville, Spaulding and Zilwaukee Townships.

The 95th state house district is currently represented by State Representative Bill G. Schuette.

Vanessa Guerra of Saginaw was restricted by term limits by the 2020 Michigan House of Representatives election.

== List of officer holders ==
95th District	Party	Dates	Notes
Melvin DeStigter	Republican	January 1, 1965 – December 31, 1978	
Jim Dressel	Republican	January 1, 1979 – December 31, 1984	
Alvin Hoekman	Republican	January 1, 1985 – December 31, 1992	
James E. O'Neill Jr.	Democrat	January 1, 1992 – December 31, 1994	
Michael J. Hanley	Democrat	January 1, 1995 – December 31, 2000	
Carl M. Williams	Democrat	January 1, 2001 – December 31, 2006	
Andrew Coulouris	Democrat	January 1, 2007 – April 23, 2010	
Stacy Erwin Oakes	Democrat	November 10, 2010 – December 31, 2014	
Vanessa Guerra	Democrat	January 1, 2015 – 2020	
Amos O'Neal	Democrat	2021–2023	
Bill G. Schuette	Republican	2023– present	

== Recent elections ==
=== 2020s ===
2026 Michigan House of Representatives election
Party	Candidate	Votes	%
Republican	Bill G. Schuette (incumbent)	26,533	58.55
Democratic	AnnMarie Horseman	18,780	41.45
Total votes		45,313	100
Republican hold			

2024 Michigan House of Representatives election
Party	Candidate	Votes	%
Republican	Bill G. Schuette	34,447	64.3
Democratic	Sabrina Lopez	19,148	35.7
Total votes		53,625	100
Republican hold			

2022 Michigan House of Representatives election
Party	Candidate	Votes	%
Republican	Bill G. Schuette	26,718	60.6
Democratic	Matthew Dawson	17,379	39.4
Total votes		44,097	100
Republican hold			

2020 Michigan House of Representatives election
Party	Candidate	Votes	%
Democratic	Amos O'Neal	23,909	70.1
Republican	Charlotte DeMaet	10,190	29.9
Total votes		34,099	100
Democratic hold			

2018 Michigan House of Representatives election
Party	Candidate	Votes	%
Democratic	Vanessa Guerra	19,421	73.1
Republican	Dorothy Tanner	7,149	26.9
Total votes		26,570	100
Democratic hold			

2016 Michigan House of Representatives election
Party	Candidate	Votes	%
Democratic	Vanessa Guerra	23,809	73.9
Republican	Dorothy Tanner	8,419	26.1
Total votes		32,228	100
Democratic hold			

2014 Michigan House of Representatives election
Party	Candidate	Votes	%
Democratic	Vanessa Guerra	17,371	76.2
Republican	Jordan Haskins	5,412	23.8
Total votes		22,785	100
Democratic hold			

2012 Michigan House of Representatives election
Party	Candidate	Votes	%
Democratic	Stacy Erwin Oakes	27,778	77.9
Republican	Jeff Baker	7,859	22.1
Total votes		35,637	100
Democratic hold			

2010 Michigan House of Representatives election
Party	Candidate	Votes	%
Democratic	Stacy Erwin Oakes	13,858	71.3
Republican	Sarge Harvey	5,577	28.7
Total votes		19,435	100
Democratic hold			

2008 Michigan House of Representatives election
Party	Candidate	Votes	%
Democratic	Andrew Coulouris		85.5
Republican	Ted Rosingana		14.5
Total votes			100
Democratic hold			

== Historical district boundaries ==
Map	Description	Apportionment Plan	Notes
	Ottawa County (part): Allendale Township; Blendon Township; Chester Township; Crockery Township; Ferrysburg; Georgetown Township; Grand Haven; Grand Haven Township; Holland Township; Hudsonville; Olive Township; Park Township; Polkton Township; Port Sheldon Township; Robinson Township; Spring Lake Township; Tallmadge Township; Wright Township; Zeeland (part)	1964 Apportionment Plan	
	Kent County (part): Grandville (part); Ottawa County (part): Allendale Township; Blendon Township; Georgetown Township (part); Grand Haven (part); Grand Haven Township; Holland Township; Olive Township; Park Township; Port Sheldon Township; Robinson Township; Tallmadge Township (part); Wright Township; Zeeland	1972 Apportionment Plan	
	Ottawa County (part): Allendale Township; Blendon Township; Chester Township; Coopersville; Crockery Township; Ferrysburg; Grand Haven; Grand Haven Township; Olive Township; Park Township; Polkton Township; Port Sheldon Township; Robinson Township; Spring Lake Township; Tallmadge Township; Wright Township	1982 Apportionment Plan	
	Saginaw County (part): Buena Vista Township; Saginaw	1992 Apportionment Plan	
	Saginaw County (part): Bridgeport Township; Buena Vista Township; Saginaw; Spaulding Township	2001 Apportionment Plan	
	Saginaw County (part): Bridgeport Township; Buena Vista Township; Carrollton Township; James Township; Kochville Township; Saginaw; Spaulding Township; Zilwaukee; Zilwaukee Township	2011 Apportionment Plan	
