= Stacy Erwin Oakes =

American politician (born 1973)

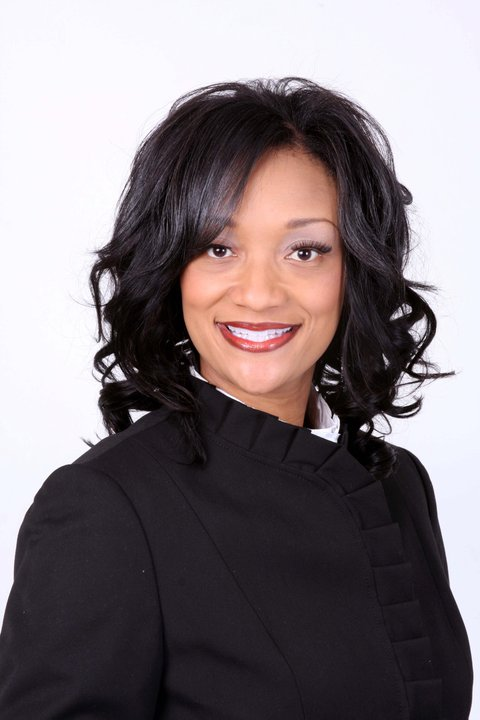

Member of the Michigan House of Representatives from the 95th district
- In office November 10, 2010 – December 31, 2014
- Preceded by: Andy Coulouris
- Succeeded by: Vanessa Guerra

Personal details
- Born: May 19, 1973 (age 53) Saginaw, Michigan, U.S.
- Party: Democratic
- Education: Michigan State University College of Law, Ferris State University
- Profession: Real Estate Developer, Attorney
- Committees: Agriculture, Judiciary, Transportation, Michigan Legislative Council
- Website: repstacyerwinoakes.com/Stacy_Erwin_Oakes (Campaign Website); House of Representatives Website

Stacy Erwin Oakes (born May 19, 1973) is a politician from the U.S. state of Michigan. She has been a Democratic Party member of the Michigan House of Representatives and Minority Whip representing Michigan's 95th District (map), located in Saginaw County, which includes the cities of Saginaw and Zilwaukee, in addition to the following townships: Bridgeport Township, Buena Vista Township, Carrollton Township, James Township, Kochville Township, Spaulding Township, and Zilwaukee Township.

== Educational background ==
A product of the Saginaw Public School District, Oakes attended Houghton Elementary, Arthur Eddy Junior High, and Saginaw High School where she graduated from in 1991. She obtained a bachelor's degree in criminal justice from Ferris State University and later earned her teaching certification while working as a corrections officer at the Saginaw Correctional Facility.

Oakes earned her Juris Doctor degree from Detroit College of Law at Michigan State University while working for the Michigan Department of Civil Rights. While at MSU, she was an instructor for the Rental Housing Clinic.

== Professional background ==
After obtaining her teaching certificate, she accepted a position with the Saginaw Public School system and taught at Central Middle and Saginaw High schools while coaching girls' basketball.

Upon her graduation from law school, Oakes accepted a position with the Michigan House of Representatives as a policy analyst. She was later appointed to the Michigan Attorney General's office, serving under both Jennifer Granholm and Mike Cox. As an assistant attorney general, she prosecuted and defended cases throughout the state of Michigan. In February 2010, Oakes was appointed to the MSU College of Law Board of Trustees. Oakes served as lead developer of Erwin Properties, LLC, which developed Erwin Senior Estates in Buena Vista Township. In 2019, Oakes was removed as general partner of the development.

== Political career ==
Oakes was elected as State Representative for the 95th District in a November 2010 special election to fill the remainder of the term for the seat vacated by Andy Coulouris. Under Michigan's legislative term limits, Coulouris was eligible for one additional term as a State Representative. As opposed to running for reelection in 2010, Coulouris instead announced that he would not seek a third term.

With the departure of Oakes' predecessor and her subsequent election to the Michigan House of Representatives, she served in the legislature for the lame duck session of 2010. In that election, she won a full term of her own which began in January 2011.

In December 2011, Oakes appeared as a guest on Off the Record (WKAR TV series), a weekly, political talk program broadcast statewide on PBS member stations throughout Michigan. Off The Record is hosted by Michigan's senior capitol correspondent, Tim Skubick. The topic of discussion included Michigan's Medical Marijuana law and Oakes' future political ambitions.

Oakes sits on the House Agricultural Committee and the House Judiciary Committee. In addition, she also sits on the Michigan Legislative Council. She ran for a second term as State Representative for the 95th district in the November 2012 general election. In August 2012, Oakes was appointed to fill a vacancy on the House Transportation Committee.

In February 2012, it was announced that Rep. Oakes would be a member of Obama for America's Truth Team. The Truth Team intends to secure grassroots and online supporters to promote President Barack Obama’s presidential achievements while holding Republicans accountable.

On November 6, 2012, Rep. Oakes was reelected to a second term, defeating her opponent with 77.53% of the vote.

Oakes ran unsuccessfully for Michigan's 32nd district Senate seat in 2014, but was soundly defeated by now-Senator Ken Horn (R-Frankenmuth).

== Post political career ==
Oakes was appointed by Flint Mayor Karen Weaver as the city of Flint's chief legal officer in April 2016. In accepting the job, she said that playing a crucial role in the Flint saga was important for her because everything else depends on how she and her team approach the legal challenges ahead. Mayor Weaver praised Oakes for her abilities: "Stacy is held in high regard by the legal community. In a statement on January 3, 2017, Mayor Weaver's office confirmed that the city had "parted ways" with City Attorney Oakes but did not provide any additional details. According to her termination letter, Weaver questioned Oakes leadership and her ability to lead the department: "The effectiveness of your management and oversight of the City of Flint's Legal Department is questionable and I lack confidence in your leadership." It was reported on April 3, 2017 that Oakes had filed a whistle-blower lawsuit against Weaver and the city of Flint, alleging she was dismissed for objecting to "fraudulent legal documents" and other illegal acts.

== Personal life ==
Representative Oakes is the daughter of James and Maggie Erwin. She is the youngest girl of six sisters and six brothers. Oakes and her husband, attorney Michael Oakes, have two children, Michael II and Kingston. They worship at New Mt. Calvary Missionary Baptist Church in Saginaw.

== Awards and other honors ==
- 2012 Ruby Award

== Electoral history ==
Michigan House of Representatives special election, 2010
Party	Candidate	Votes	%	±%
Democratic	Stacy Erwin Oakes	13,775	72%	−
Republican	Sarge Harvey III	5,421	28%	−
Majority				
Turnout		19,196	100%	−
Democratic hold		Swing	No	

Michigan House of Representatives general election, 2010
Party	Candidate	Votes	%	±%
Democratic	Stacy Erwin Oakes	13,855	72%	−
Republican	Sarge Harvey III	5,577	28%	−
Majority				
Turnout		19,432	100%	−
Democratic hold		Swing	No	

Michigan House of Representatives general election, 2012
Party	Candidate	Votes	%	±%
Democratic	Stacy Erwin Oakes	27,778	77.53%	−
Republican	Jeff Baker	7,859	21.93%	−
Majority				
Turnout		35,831	100%	−
Democratic hold		Swing	No	

== See also ==
Michigan House of Representatives
Preceded by Andy Coulouris	Michigan State Representative, 95th District; 2010-Present	Succeeded by Incumbent
