= Andrew Coulouris =

American politician

Andy Coulouris

Member of the Michigan House of Representatives from the 95th district
- In office January 1, 2007 – April 23, 2010
- Preceded by: Carl M. Williams
- Succeeded by: Stacy Erwin Oakes

Member of the Saginaw City Council
- In office February 11, 2002 – September 12, 2005

Personal details
- Born: Andrew James Coulouris; August 10, 1978 (age 48) Saginaw, Michigan
- Party: Democratic
- Spouse: Natasha
- Children: Alex
- Education: University of Michigan Law School; University of Michigan

Andrew James Coulouris (born August 10, 1978) is a politician from the U.S. state of Michigan. He is a former Democratic Party member of the Michigan State House of Representatives from the 95th District, located in Saginaw County, which includes the city of Saginaw, Buena Vista Township, Spaulding Township, and Bridgeport Township.

== Early life ==
Coulouris graduated from Arthur Hill High School in 1996. He earned a bachelor's degree in political science from the University of Michigan and a Juris Doctor degree from the University of Michigan Law School. He and his wife Natasha have been married since 2002 and have a child, Alex, who was born in 2006, and Mia who was born in 2010. He is a member of St. John's Episcopal Church in Saginaw.

== Political career ==
=== City of Saginaw ===
Coulouris served as a member of the Saginaw City Council, having been appointed on February 11, 2002 to fill the remaining term of a seat vacated by another council member. He was subsequently elected to the city council in the 2003 election for a full four-year term, but he resigned before completing his term on September 12, 2005. He also served as Assistant Prosecuting Attorney for Saginaw County, although the position is not an elected position.

=== State representative ===
In the August 8, 2006 Democratic primary election he was the leading candidate among five candidates having received a plurality with 39.18% of the votes. In the general election held on November 7, 2006, Coulouris defeated Republican Joel Wilson, receiving 80.94% of the votes cast in the 95th District, a district heavily favoring candidates from the Democratic Party. His first term ended on January 1, 2009.

In the August 5, 2008 Democratic Primary election he defeated Terry W. Sangster, a former County Commissioner and Democratic candidate for State Representative, receiving 77.56% of the votes cast in the 95th district. Coulouris defeated Republican Ted Rosingana in the November 4, 2008 General Election, receiving 85.47% of the votes cast in the 95th District. Had he not resigned, his second term would have ended on January 1, 2011.

As a state representative, Coulouris served on the Banking and Financial Services, Health Policy, Judiciary, and Tax Policy Committees. He was the Chair of the Banking and Financial Services Committee. Coulouris was also named 2009 Legislator of the Year by the Michigan Municipal League.

=== Resignation from office ===
Under Michigan's legislative term limits, Coulouris was eligible for one additional term as a State Representative. As opposed to running for reelection in 2010, Coulouris instead announced that he would not seek a third term, citing the desire to spend more time with his family. However, it was later revealed that Coulouris took a job as a lobbyist for Dow Corning in Washington, D.C., and he resigned his position as State Representative on April 30, 2010. This left the 95th District without representation for a period of over 5 months, until the special election of Stacy Erwin Oakes in November 2010.

Michigan House of Representatives
Preceded by Carl M. Williams	Michigan State Representative, 95th District; 2007- 2010	Succeeded by Stacy Erwin Oakes
