= Bridgeport Bridge =

Bridgeport Bridge may refer to:

- Bridgeport Bridge (Denmark, Iowa), a Historic American Engineering Record (HAER)-documented bridge spanning the Skunk River in Lee County, Iowa
- State Street Bridge (also known as the Bridgeport Bridge), a NRHP-listed bridge in Bridgeport, Michigan
- Bridgeport Bridge (Bridgeport, Pennsylvania), an HAER-documented Philadelphia & Western Railway bridge in Bridgeport, Pennsylvania
- Bridgeport Bridge (Ohio River), a former bridge spanning an Ohio River channel at Wheeling, West Virginia, also HAER-documented
- Bridgeport Bridge (Bridgeport, Wisconsin), an HAER-documented bridge spanning the Wisconsin River at U.S. Highway 18, in Bridgeport, Wisconsin
- Bridgeport Bridge (Kitchener, Ontario), a rainbow arch bridge built in 1934 over Grand River in Kitchener, Ontario.
