= Bill G. Schuette =

American politician

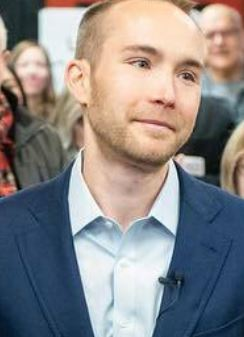

Member of the Michigan House of Representatives from the 95th district
- Incumbent
- Assumed office January 1, 2023
- Preceded by: Amos O'Neal

Personal details
- Born: William Grebe Schuette; July 21, 1995 (age 31) Midland, Michigan, U.S.
- Party: Republican
- Relatives: Bill Schuette (father)
- Education: Georgetown University (BS, MA)

William "Bill" Grebe Schuette (/ˈʃuːti/ SHOO-tee; born July 21, 1995) is an American politician and former intelligence analyst for the Defense Intelligence Agency from 2018 to 2021 who is currently representing Michigan's 95th district in the Michigan House of Representatives. He is the son of former Michigan Attorney General Bill Schuette.

== Education and career ==
Schuette graduated from Georgetown University in 2017 with a Bachelor of Science in international relations and affairs and received his Masters of Arts in Latin American studies in 2018. During this time, Schuette served as an intern in the Office of Brazil & Southern Cone and the U.S. Embassy in Chile.

In September 2018, Schuette joined the Defense Intelligence Agency as an intelligence analyst until he accepted a position in government relations for Dow Inc.

== Political candidacy ==
On January 10, 2022, Schuette announced his candidacy as a Republican for state representative of Michigan's 95th house of representatives district at Pizza Sam's pizzeria in Midland, Michigan. Under Michigan's new state district lines form the 2021 redistricting, the 95th district will include the entirety of Midland County and some Gladwin County townships. Schuette won the general election with 61% of the vote. He was reelected in 2024.

He is a member of the National Rifle Association, Right to Life of Michigan, Michigan Farm Bureau, and the Midland Business Alliance.
