= Bridport (disambiguation) =

Bridport is a town in Dorset, England.

Bridport may also refer to:

== Places ==
- Bridport (UK Parliament constituency)
- Bridport (ward), Dorset
- Bridport, Tasmania, Australia
- Bridport, Vermont, United States

== People ==
- Viscount Bridport and Baron Bridport, including a list of people with the title(s)
- Giles of Bridport (13th century), Bishop of Salisbury
- John de Bridport (12th–13th century), Archdeacon of Totnes

== Other uses ==
- HMS Bridport, several British ships
- Bridport F.C., a football club

== See also ==
- Bridgeport (disambiguation)
