= Vanessa Guerra =

American politician

Clerk of Saginaw County
- Incumbent
- Assumed office January 1, 2021
- Preceded by: Michael J. Hanley

Member of the Michigan House of Representatives from the 95th district
- In office January 1, 2015 – January 1, 2021
- Preceded by: Stacy Erwin Oakes
- Succeeded by: Amos O'Neal

Personal details
- Born: September 14, 1989 (age 36) Saginaw, Michigan, U.S.
- Party: Democratic
- Education: University of Michigan (BA); University of Detroit (JD)
- Website: State House website

Vanessa Guerra (born September 14, 1989) is a Democratic politician from Michigan who currently serves as the Clerk of Saginaw County. She previously represented the 95th District in the Michigan House of Representatives from 2015 to 2021.

Guerra did not seek re-election to the House of Representatives in 2020 due to term limits, instead challenging incumbent Clerk Michael J. Hanley in the Democratic primary. She defeated Hanley, receiving approximately 67% of the vote to Hanley's 33%. Guerra won the general election unopposed.

Guerra attended Bridgeport-Spaulding Schools and the University of Michigan.

Currently a law student at the University of Detroit Mercy School of Law, Guerra is the minority vice chairwoman of the House Criminal Justice Committee.

Elected at the age of 25, Guerra was the youngest member of the Michigan Legislature until the election of Jewell Jones.
