= Michigan's 85th House of Representatives district =

American legislative district

Michigan's 85th State House of Representatives district
Representative
Bradley Slagh; R–Zeeland
- Demographics: 86.6% White; 1.4% Black; 6.3% Hispanic; 2.2% Asian; 0.1% Native American; 0.6% Other; 2.9% Multiracial
- Population (2024): 91,232

Michigan's 85th House of Representatives district (also referred to as Michigan's 85th House district) is a legislative district within the Michigan House of Representatives located in part of Ottawa County. The district was created in 1965, when the Michigan House of Representatives district naming scheme changed from a county-based system to a numerical one.

== List of representatives ==
Representative	Party	Dates	Residence	Notes
William A. Boos Jr.	Democratic	1965–1966	Saginaw	
James E. O'Neill Jr.	Democratic	1967–1992	Saginaw	
Clark A. Harder	Democratic	1993–1998	Owosso	
Larry Julian	Republican	1999–2004	Lennon	
Richard Ball	Republican	2005–2010	Laingsburg	Lived in Bennington Township until around 2009.
Ben Glardon	Republican	2011–2016	Owosso	
Ben Frederick	Republican	2017–2022	Owosso	
Bradley Slagh	Republican	2023–present	Zeeland	

== Recent elections ==
=== 2020s ===
2026 Michigan House of Representatives election
Party	Candidate	Votes	%
Republican	Bradley Slagh (incumbent)	32,911	67.5
Democratic	Richard Abraham	15,843	32.5
Total votes		48,754	100
Republican hold			

2024 Michigan House of Representatives election
Party	Candidate	Votes	%
Republican	Bradley Slagh	39,199	70.4
Democratic	Marcia Mansaray	16,490	29.6
Total votes		55,689	100
Republican hold			

2022 Michigan House of Representatives election
Party	Candidate	Votes	%
Republican	Bradley Slagh	32,848	70.1
Democratic	Todd Avery	13,336	28.5
Libertarian	Greg Parlmer	688	1.5
Total votes		46,872	100
Republican hold			

2020 Michigan House of Representatives election
Party	Candidate	Votes	%
Republican	Ben Frederick	32,833	65.2
Democratic	Andrea Garrison	17,494	34.8
Total votes		50,327	100
Republican hold			

2018 Michigan House of Representatives election
Party	Candidate	Votes	%
Republican	Ben Frederick	23,692	61.8
Democratic	Eric Edward Sabin	14,652	38.2
Total votes		38,344	100
Republican hold			

2016 Michigan House of Representatives election
Party	Candidate	Votes	%
Republican	Ben Frederick	24,683	56.2
Democratic	Anthony Karhoff	15,124	34.4
Libertarian	Roger L. Snyder	2,425	5.5
Constitution	Matthew Shepard	1,674	3.8
Write-in	Robert Cottrell	3	0.01
Total votes		43,909	100
Republican hold			

2014 Michigan House of Representatives election
Party	Candidate	Votes	%
Republican	Ben Glardon	16,882	52.6
Democratic	Annie Dignan Braidwood	13,714	42.8
Libertarian	Roger Snyder	1,473	4.6
Total votes		32,069	100
Republican hold			

2012 Michigan House of Representatives election
Party	Candidate	Votes	%
Republican	Ben Glardon	23,185	53.6
Democratic	Paul Ray	17,278	39.9
Independent	Matthew Shepard	2,803	6.5
Total votes		43,266	100
Republican hold			

2010 Michigan House of Representatives election
Party	Candidate	Votes	%
Republican	Ben Glardon	22,363	67.5
Democratic	Pamela Drake	10,764	32.5
Total votes		33,127	100
Republican hold			

2008 Michigan House of Representatives election
Party	Candidate	Votes	%
Republican	Richard Ball	22,205	52.8
Democratic	Judy Ford	18,593	44.2
Constitution	James Gould	1,280	3.0
Total votes		42,078	100
Republican hold			

== Historical district boundaries ==
Map	Description	Apportionment Plan	Notes
	Saginaw County (part): Saginaw (part)	1964 Apportionment Plan	
	Saginaw County (part): Saginaw (part)	1972 Apportionment Plan	
	Saginaw County (part): Carrollton Township; Saginaw	1982 Apportionment Plan	
	Clinton County (part): Duplain Township; Ovid Township; Victor Township; Shiawassee County	1992 Apportionment Plan	
	Clinton County (part): Bath Township; Dewitt Township (part); Ovid Township; Victor Township; Shiawassee County	2001 Apportionment Plan	
	Saginaw County (part): Brady Township; Brant Township; Chapin Township; Chesaning Township; Fremont Township; Jonesfield Township; Lakefield Township; Maple Grove Township; Marion Township; Richland Township; Shiawassee County	2011 Apportionment Plan	
