= Larry Julian =

American politician (born 1949)

Member of the Michigan House of Representatives from the 85th district
- In office January 1, 1999 – December 31, 2004
- Preceded by: Clark Harder
- Succeeded by: Richard Ball

Personal details
- Born: August 19, 1949 (age 77)
- Party: Republican
- Spouse: Nancy

Larry Julian (born August 19, 1949) is a former Republican of the Michigan House of Representatives, representing Shiawassee County and three townships in Clinton County from 1999 to 2004. He was Speaker pro tempore of the House during the 92nd Legislature (2003-2004). Julian served as supervisor of Venice Township from 1991 to 1996.

Twice, in 1999 and 2004, Julian introduced a proposal to lift Michigan's constitutional ban on the death penalty for first-degree murder.

Julian was a Michigan State Police trooper for 25 years, as well as an insurance agent, restaurant owner, and he is involved in numerous community organizations, including as a past president of the Lennon Lions Club. Julian is a partner in the lobbying firm Julian Vail with his former legislative aide, Val Vail-Shirey.
