= William A. Boos Jr. =

American politician (1922–2002)

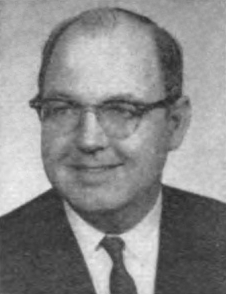

Member of the Michigan House of Representatives from the 85th district Saginaw County 1st (1961-1964)
- In office January 1, 1961 – December 31, 1966
- Preceded by: Robert S. Gilbert
- Succeeded by: James E. O'Neill Jr.

Personal details
- Born: September 27, 1922 Detroit, Michigan
- Died: August 22, 2002 (aged 79)
- Party: Democratic
- Education: Detroit College of Law; Michigan State University
- Profession: Lawyer

Military service
- Allegiance: United States of America
- Branch/service: United States Army
- Battles/wars: World War II

William A. Boos Jr. (September 27, 1922 – August 22, 2002) was an American politician who served as a member of the Michigan House of Representatives during the 1960s representing a portion of Saginaw County.

== Early life and education ==
Boos was born in Detroit in September 1922 and raised in Saginaw. He graduated from Michigan State University with an A.B. degree in 1947 and Detroit College of Law with a LL.B degree in 1951. He joined the United States Army, where he served in New Guinea in the Pacific theater during World War II.

== Career ==
Elected to the House in 1960, Boos was also a delegate to the 1964 Democratic National Convention. Following his retirement from the Legislature, Boos was appointed by Governor George W. Romney to the Michigan Public Service Commission on May 15, 1967, where he served until July 2, 1971.

He was a member of the American Legion, the Veterans of Foreign Wars, and the Optimist Club.

Boos died on August 22, 2002, about a month short of his 80th birthday.
