= Richard Ball (Michigan politician) =

American politician (1932–2019)

Richard J. Ball O.D., Ph.D, FAAO
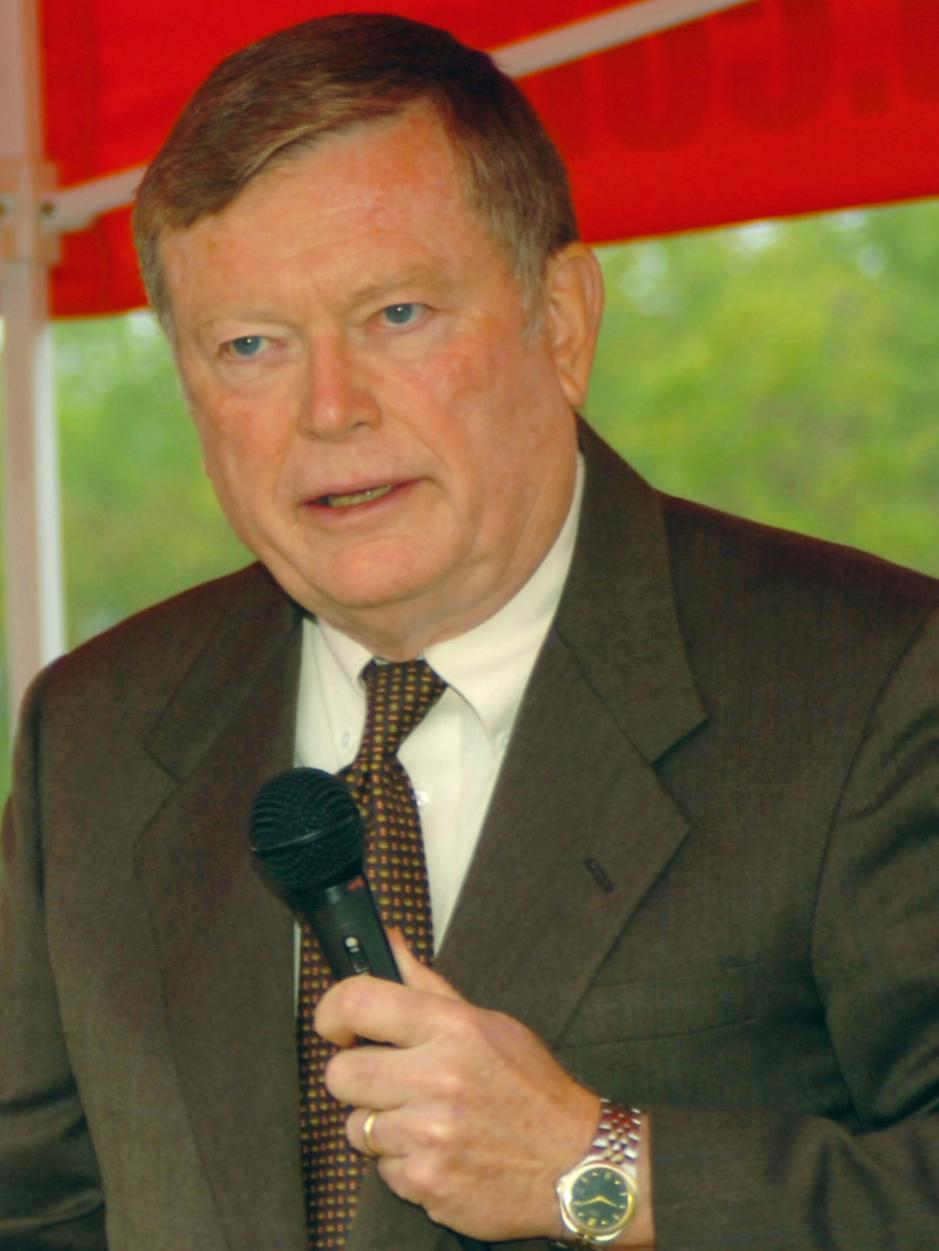

Member of the Michigan House of Representatives from the 85th district
- In office January 1, 2005 – December 31, 2010
- Preceded by: Larry Julian
- Succeeded by: Ben Glardon

Personal details
- Born: May 8, 1932 Owosso, Michigan, U.S.
- Died: September 7, 2019 (aged 87) Byron, Michigan, U.S.
- Party: Republican
- Spouse: Connie

Military service
- Allegiance: United States of America
- Branch/service: United States Army

Richard J. Ball (May 8, 1932 – September 7, 2019) was an American politician who was a Republican member of the Michigan House of Representatives from 2005 to 2010, representing Shiawassee County and three townships in Clinton County.

== Biography ==
Richard J. Ball was born in Owosso, Michigan on May 8, 1932. He was an optometrist in Owosso for over 50 years, following the tradition of his father, Dr. L.P. Ball, who practiced in Owosso for 54 years. Dr. Ball received a lifetime achievement award from the Michigan Optometric Association in 2001.

Ball received a doctorate in visual experimental psychology from Michigan State University, and an optometry degree from Ohio State University in 1955. Ball was very active in the formation of the Michigan College of Optometry at Ferris State University. He also served on the Owosso school board for 16 years.

Ball died in Byron, Michigan on September 7, 2019, at the age of 87.
