= Michael J. Hanley =

American politician from Michigan

The Honorable Michael J. Hanley

Clerk of Saginaw County
- In office 2017–2020
- Preceded by: Susan Kaltenbach
- Succeeded by: Vanessa Guerra

Chairman of the Saginaw County Board of Commissioners
- In office January 2, 2013 – 2016
- Preceded by: Michael P. O'Hare

Member of the Saginaw County Board of Commissioners from the 11th District
- Incumbent
- Assumed office January 1, 2009
- Preceded by: James M. Graham

Member of the Michigan House of Representatives from the 95th district
- In office January 1, 1995 – December 31, 2000
- Preceded by: James E. O'Neill, Jr.
- Succeeded by: Carl M. Williams

Member of the Saginaw City Council
- In office 1987–1993

Personal details
- Born: December 9, 1955 (age 70) Saginaw, Michigan
- Party: Democratic
- Spouse: Susi
- Education: Western Michigan University

Michael J. Hanley (born December 9, 1955) is a former chairman of the Saginaw County Board of Commissioners and a former Democratic member of the Michigan House of Representatives.

Born in December 1955 in Saginaw, Hanley graduated from Arthur Hill High School in 1974. He received a degree in political science from Western Michigan University, graduating summa cum laude. Hanley worked for 17 years for General Motors' Saginaw Division. He was elected to Saginaw City Council in 1987 and was re-elected in 1991; he served as mayor pro tempore from 1991 to 1993. In 1994, Hanley was elected to the Michigan House of Representatives. Re-elected twice, he served as Democratic leader from 1999 to 2000.

Hanley was or is involved in numerous community organizations, including as a past chair of the Mayor's Housing Task Force, treasurer of the Solid Waste Management Authority, the East Central Michigan Planning and Development Region Board, and the Underground Railroad Shelter for Battered Women and Children.

Hanley was elected to the Saginaw County Board of Commissioners in 2008, and became chairman of the board in 2013. In 2016, Hanley announced plans to run for the position of Saginaw County clerk, taking over for the retiring incumbent clerk, Susan Kaltenbach. That year, he won election. In 2020, he was defeated in his attempt at re-election the primary election by State Rep. Vanessa Guerra.
