= Bridgeport High School =

Bridgeport High School can refer to:

In the USA

- Bridgeport High School — Bridgeport, Connecticut now called Central High School
- Bridgeport High School — Bridgeport, Illinois (opened in 1880s; closed in 1973)
- Bridgeport High School — Bridgeport, Michigan
- Bridgeport High School — Bridgeport, Nebraska
- Bridgeport High School — Bridgeport, Ohio
- Bridgeport Academy High — Bridgeport, Texas
- Bridgeport High School — Bridgeport, Texas
- Bridgeport High School — Bridgeport, Washington
- Bridgeport High School — Bridgeport, West Virginia
- Bridgeport Aurora High School — Bridgeport, Washington
- Bridgeport Community Correctional Center — Bridgeport, Connecticut
- Bridgeport-Spaulding Alternative Education School — Saginaw, Michigan

Elsewhere

- Bridgeport High School — Jamaica
