= Ben Glardon =

American politician (born 1954)

Member of the Michigan House of Representatives from the 85th district
- In office January 1, 2011 – December 31, 2016
- Preceded by: Richard Ball
- Succeeded by: Ben Frederick

Personal details
- Born: November 13, 1954 (age 71) Owosso, Michigan
- Party: Republican
- Spouse: Miriam
- Occupation: Realtor
- Website: State Rep. Ben Glardon

Ben Glardon (born November 13, 1954) was a Republican member of the Michigan House of Representatives.

Prior to his election to the legislature, Glardon was president of Glardon Auction Service. He has been a licensed Realtor since 1983.
