= Carl M. Williams =

American politician (born 1942)

The Honorable Carl M. Williams

Member of the Michigan House of Representatives from the 95th district
- In office January 1, 2001 – December 31, 2006
- Preceded by: Michael J. Hanley
- Succeeded by: Andy Coulouris

Member of the Saginaw City Council
- In office November 11, 1991 – April 17, 2000

Personal details
- Born: May 6, 1942 (age 84)
- Party: Democratic
- Spouse: Lavion
- Children: 3
- Occupation: State representative

Carl M. Williams (born May 6, 1942) was a member of the State House of Representatives in the Michigan Legislature for three terms (2001–2007).

Prior to serving as state representative, Williams was elected to the Saginaw city council—an office which he held from November 11, 1991 until April 17, 2000. Saginaw's city charter prohibits currently serving members of the city council from seeking any other elective office. As a consequence, Williams resigned from the city council immediately prior to becoming a candidate for state representative. During his tenure as a city councilman, Williams was selected by the city council to serve as mayor pro tempore for two years.

Williams was first elected to the legislature in 2000 and subsequently re-elected in 2002 and 2004. Because of term limit provisions in the Michigan Constitution, he was ineligible to seek re-election in 2006.

He was a candidate for the Michigan Senate representing the 32nd District and prevailed over two other candidates, Dave Adams and Aaron Dodak, in the Democratic Party primary election on August 8, 2006. In the general election held on November 7, 2006, Williams was defeated by Republican Party candidate Roger Kahn, a representative from the 94th state house district. It was the closest Michigan senate race that year, with Kahn winning by only 450 votes, or 0.48% of the vote, only after a recount.

As a member of the State House of Representatives, Williams served on the Appropriations Committee and its Subcommittees for General Government (for which he was minority party Vice Chairman), State Police/Military and Veterans Affairs (for which he was also minority party Vice Chairman), Natural Resources and Environmental Quality and School Aid and Department of Education.

Prior to his election to public office, Williams was employed by Delphi Steering Systems in Saginaw as an Employee Assistance Program Coordinator and manufacturing supervisor.

Williams and his wife Lavion have three children and live in Saginaw.

Michigan House of Representatives
Preceded by Michael J. Hanley	Michigan State Representative, 95th District; 2001- 2007	Succeeded by Andrew Coulouris
