= Schmidt Site =

Archaeological site in Michigan, United States

- U.S. National Register of Historic Places
- Nearest city: Bridgeport, Michigan
- Coordinates: 43°20′50″N 83°55′10″W
- Area: 40 acres (16 ha)
- NRHP reference No.: 73000958
- Added to NRHP: July 27, 1973

The Schmidt Site, also designated 20SA192, is an archaeological site located just south of the Cass River near Bridgeport, Michigan. It was listed on the National Register of Historic Places in 1973.

== History ==
The Schmidt Site was settled in the Archaic period, at a time approximately 6000 to 4000 years before the present. The data suggest that the site was inhabited year-round over a number of years.

The location of the Schmidt Site was first noted in modern times in the late 1950s. The first excavations were conducted by Bernard Spencer in 1962. In 1964, James Fitting from the University of Michigan Museum of Natural History continued the excavations. Work was continued in 1971 by Richard Mock of Saginaw Valley State University. It was revisited again in 1973 and 1977 by staff from Western Michigan University. Stone, stone tools, and animal bones were recovered from the site, as well as charcoal. The bones primarily represented deer, but fish bones were also recovered.

== Description ==
The Schmidt Site is located on a rise just south of the Cass River, overlooking the marshy floodplain of the river. This rise would have been the shore of the prehistoric Lake Nippissing, or the earlier glacial Lake Algonquin. The site itself borders an agricultural field, although much of the site has never been farmed. Material from the site is scattered about, covering an area of over 40 acres. Much was recovered from relatively deep middens.
