= Bridgeport, California (disambiguation) =

Bridgeport, California is a census-designated place in Mono County.

Bridgeport, California may also refer to:

- Bridgeport, Mariposa County, California, a ghost town
- Bridgeport, Mendocino County, California
- Bridgeport, Nevada County, California
- Bridgeville, California, formerly Bridgeport, in Humboldt County
