= Ben Frederick =

American politician

Majority Leader of the Michigan House of Representatives
- In office January 1, 2021 – January 1, 2023
- Preceded by: Triston Cole
- Succeeded by: Abraham Aiyash

Member of the Michigan House of Representatives from the 85th district
- Incumbent
- Assumed office January 1, 2017
- Preceded by: Ben Glardon

Mayor of Owosso
- In office November 9, 2009 – November 21, 2016
- Preceded by: Michael Bruff
- Succeeded by: Christopher Eveleth

Personal details
- Born: July 8, 1982 (age 44) Owosso, Michigan, U.S.
- Party: Republican
- Spouse: Lydia
- Education: Michigan State University; Liberty University (BA)
- Website: Party website

Benjamin R. Frederick (born July 8, 1982) is a former Republican member of the Michigan House of Representatives and the former mayor of Owosso.

== Biography ==
An Owosso native, Frederick was elected to the city council in 2007 and was selected by the council as mayor in 2009.

Prior to his election to the House, Frederick worked for three members of the Michigan Legislature.

Frederick currently serves on the Board of Directors for the Michigan College Access Network and Associate Vice President of Advocacy and Government Relations at Memorial Healthcare.

== Electoral history ==
=== 2016 ===
General Election—85th District
Party	Candidate	Votes	%
Republican	Ben Frederick	24,683	56.21%
Democratic	Anthony Karhoff	15,124	34.44%
Libertarian	Roger Snyder	2,425	5.52%
Constitution	Matthew Shepard	1,674	3.81%
Write-in	Robert Cottrell	3	0.01%
Total votes		43,909	100%
Republican hold			

Primary Election—85th District
Party	Candidate	Votes	%
Republican	Ben Frederick	5,690	64.91%
Republican	Hartmann Aue	2,087	23.81%
Republican	Robert Cottrell	706	8.05%
Republican	George Sode	283	3.23%
Total votes		8,766	100%

Michigan House of Representatives
Preceded by Triston Cole	Majority Leader of the Michigan House of Representatives; 2021–2023	Succeeded by Abraham Aiyash
