= James E. O'Neill Jr. =

American politician

The Honorable James E. O'Neill Jr.
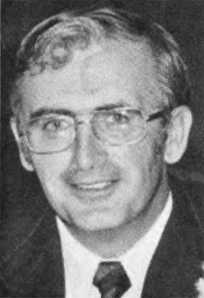

Member of the Michigan House of Representatives from the 95th district
- In office January 1, 1993 – December 31, 1994
- Preceded by: Alvin Hoekman
- Succeeded by: Michael J. Hanley

Member of the Michigan House of Representatives from the 85th district
- In office January 1, 1967 – December 31, 1992
- Preceded by: William A. Boos Jr.
- Succeeded by: Clark Harder

Personal details
- Born: May 26, 1929 Saginaw, Michigan
- Died: December 31, 2002 (aged 73)
- Party: Democratic
- Education: Central Michigan University; University of Michigan
- Profession: Teacher

Military service
- Allegiance: United States of America
- Branch/service: Army
- Years of service: 1951-1953

James E. O'Neill Jr. was a Democratic Michigan politician and teacher who served as a member of that state's House of Representatives from 1967 through 1994. A high school teacher and elementary school principal in Hemlock, O'Neill was a tireless advocate for schools and education, a respected source of information on school finance, and a key contributor to the landmark changes made by Proposal A. O'Neill was also a strong supporter of Saginaw Valley State University, and the arena in the Ryder Center on the campus was named in his honor in 1989. Following his retirement from the Legislature, O'Neill was appointed to the Board of State Canvassers. He died of complications from open-heart surgery on December 31, 2002, aged 73.
