= Bugai Site =

Archaeological site in Michigan, United States

- Bugai Site (20SA215)
- U.S. National Register of Historic Places
- Location within Michigan Location within the United States
- Location: Address Restricted, near Bridgeport, Michigan
- Coordinates: 43°20′00″N 83°51′30″W
- Area: 6 acres (2.4 ha)
- NRHP reference No.: 82000543
- Added to NRHP: October 29, 1982

The Bugai Site, designated 20SA215, is an archaeological site located near Bridgeport, Michigan. It was listed on the National Register of Historic Places in 1982.

The site was a burial location dating from the Middle Woodland period.

In 1970, workers encountered human remains while excavating sand from private property at this site. Amateur archaeologists Leo Purple and Arthur Graves conducted a salvage excavation at the site later that year, and recovered remains of at least 20 individuals. The majority of the burials were bundle burials, containing multiple objects. Purple and Graves donated some of the items to the University of Michigan Museum of Anthropological Archaeology (UMMAA) in 1976, and some to the Chippewa Nature Center in Midland, MI in 1974. In 2006, the Nature Center donated human remains and objects from the Bugai site to the UMMAA.
