= Bridgeport, Mendocino County, California =

Former town

Coordinates: 39.056°N 123.686°W

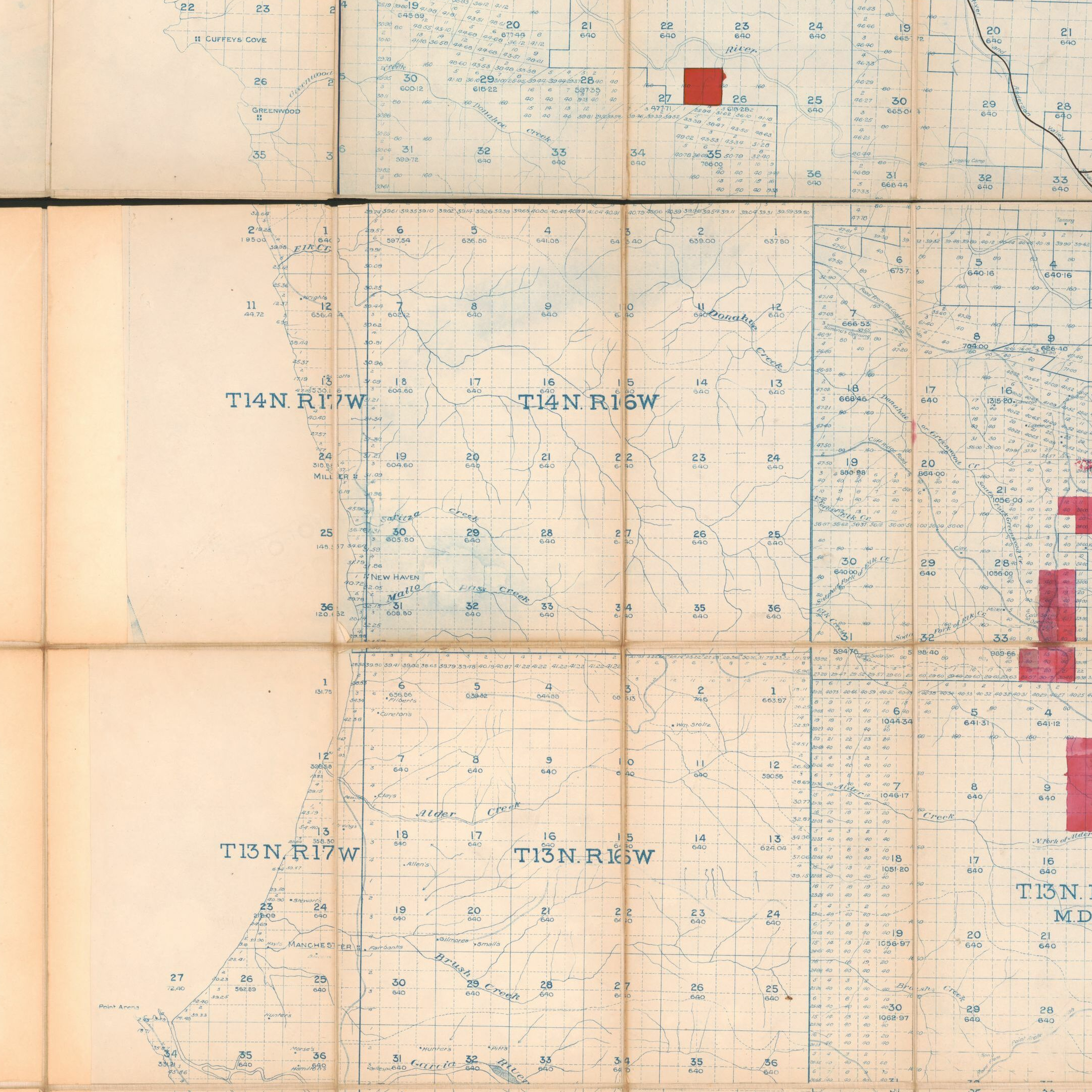
Former location of Bridgeport/Miller, in relation to neighboring communities such as Greenwood (now Elk), Point Arena and Manchester

Bridgeport is a former logging town on the coast of Mendocino County, California. Its post office was given the name Miller, as there was already a Bridgeport post office in California.

It was described in the early 20th century as having once been "a thriving mercantile and shipping place", with a harbor ultimately considered to be too dangerous for regular use.

The Miller post office was first established in 1873, discontinued in 1880, re-established in 1883, and finally moved to Elk in 1908.

== Related locations ==
- U.S. Geological Survey Geographic Names Information System: Bridgeport School
- U.S. Geological Survey Geographic Names Information System: Bridgeport Landing
