= HMS Bridport =

Two ships of the Royal Navy have borne the name HMS Bridport after the English south coast town of Bridport:

- HMS Bridport (J50) was a Bangor-class minesweeper launched in December 1940 in Dumbarton, Scotland. The vessel was transferred to the Royal Air Force in 1946 and renamed HMRAFV Bridport and was eventually broken up at Plymouth in 1959.
- HMS Bridport (M105) was a Sandown-class minehunter launched in 1992 at Vosper Thorneycroft's shipyard in Southampton. The ship was paid off in 2003 and sold to the Estonian Navy in 2006.
