= Amos O'Neal =

American politician (born 1961)

Member of the Michigan House of Representatives
- Incumbent
- Assumed office January 1, 2021
- Preceded by: Vanessa Guerra
- Constituency: 95th district (2021–2023); 94th district (2023–present)

Personal details
- Born: July 17, 1963 (age 63) Saginaw, Michigan
- Party: Democratic
- Education: Delta College; Northwood University

Amos O'Neal, (born July 17, 1961) in Saginaw, Michigan, is an American Democratic politician who represents the 94th district in the Michigan House of Representatives, serving the city of Saginaw and parts of Saginaw Township. O'Neal is the Democratic Caucus Chair for the 2023-24 legislative session. First elected in 2022, he was reelected in 2024.
