= State Street Bridge (Bridgeport, Michigan) =

- U.S. National Register of Historic Places
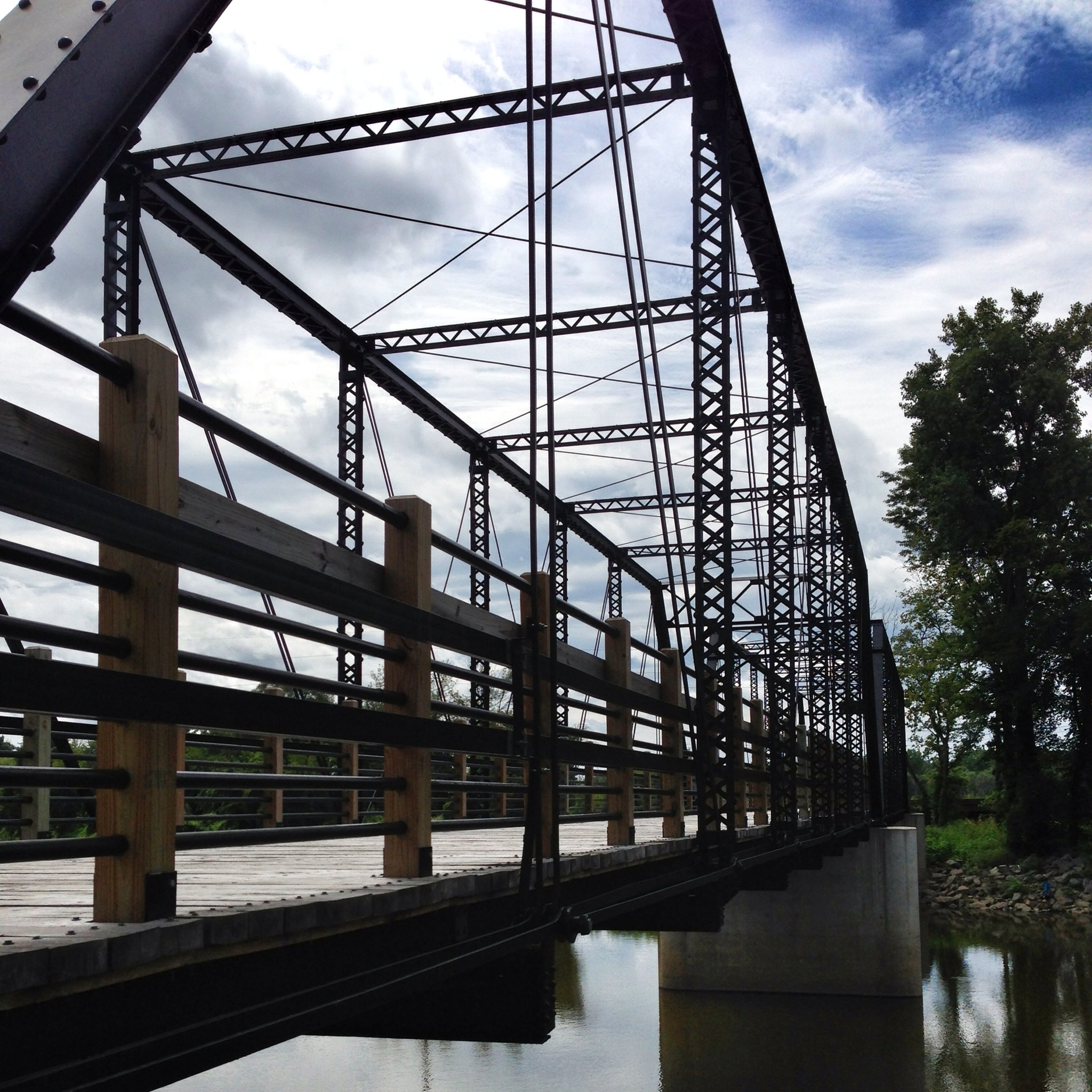
- View of bridge after restoration
- Interactive map
- Location: State St. (Fort Rd.) over the Cass R., Bridgeport, Michigan
- Coordinates: 43°21′29″N 83°52′57″W
- Area: less than one acre
- Built: 1906
- Built by: Joliet Bridge and Iron Company
- Architectural style: Pratt Through Truss
- NRHP reference No.: 95001391
- Added to NRHP: November 29, 1995

The State Street Bridge, also known as the Fort Road Bridge or the Bridgeport Bridge, is a bridge carrying State Street (Fort Road) over the Cass River in Bridgeport, Michigan, United States. It was listed on the National Register of Historic Places in 1995.

== History ==
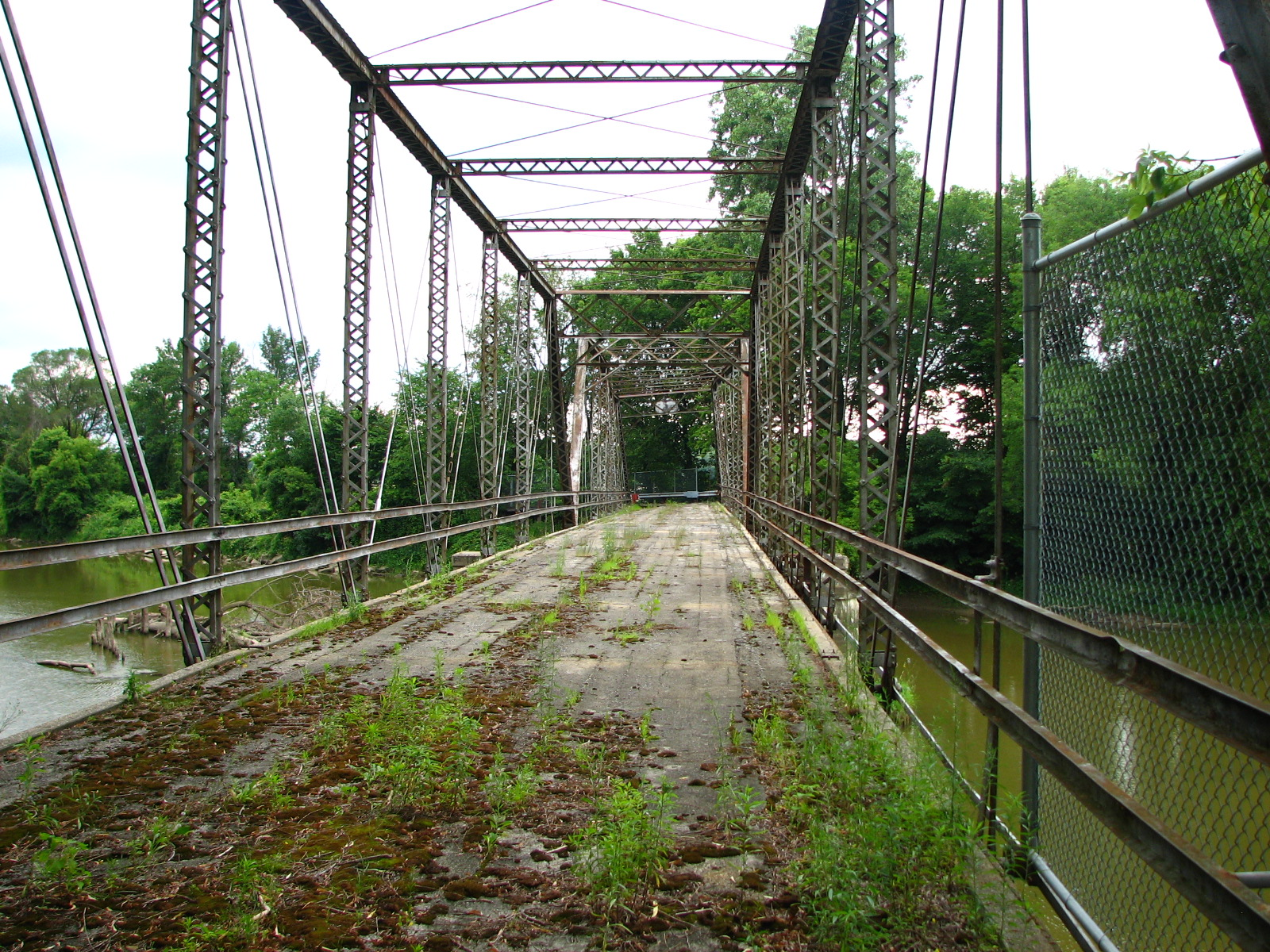
State Street Bridge, 2008, before restoration

A series of bridges crossing the Cass River were constructed near what is now Bridgeport, starting in about 1841 with a crossing on the federal turnpike a few miles southeast. By the 1870s, a bridge was constructed about a half-mile south of the current location. In about 1886, a timber bridge was constructed at the current location and the road rerouted along the west side of the river to connect to the site of the previous bridge. However, by the turn of the century this timber bridge had deteriorated. In 1906, a portion of the bridge was destroyed by floating debris, and subsequent inspection revealed that the support pilings were rotted through. The township approved a bond issue, and later that year hired the Joliet Bridge and Iron Company to construct a new bridge.

The bridge was completed later that year, and served as the only access to Bridgeport from the south until 1958, when a new bridge was constructed to the south. The bridge was abandoned by Saginaw County in 1969 and reverted to Bridgeport Township. It was closed to highway traffic in about 1972 and converted to pedestrian use. By the 2000s, the bridge had deteriorated, and one support pier was in danger of collapsing. In 2010, the bridge was dismantled and completely restored, with the piers replaced, for continued use as a pedestrian bridge.

== Description ==
The State Street Bridge is a two-span, steel, Pratt Through Truss bridge with pinned connections. Each span is 126 feet long, and is supported by concrete abutments on each end and a steel I-beam on concrete piers in the center of the river. The center I-beam replaced an original large concrete pier which was destroyed by ice in 1927. Each span is identical, and consists of eight panels. The upper chords are made of two channels with cover plates above and lattice below. The vertical posts are made of two channels connected by lattice bracing connecting them on both sides. Struts connecting the posts are made of back-to-hack angles connected by lattice bracing. The bridge deck is of wood plank, and is supported by steel stringers which are in turn supported by I-beam girders. Two sets of channels form a guardrail on each side. At each end of the bridge is a plaque stating: "1906 / BUILT BY / THE JOLIET BRIDGE / & / IRON CO / JOLIET ILL"
