= Bridgeport station =

Bridgeport may refer to the following railway stations:

- Bridgeport station (Connecticut), a train station in Bridgeport, Connecticut
- Bridgeport station (SEPTA), a station on the SEPTA Norristown High Speed Line in Bridgeport, Pennsylvania
- Bridgeport station (SkyTrain), a light metro station on the Canada Line in Richmond, British Columbia
