= USS Bridgeport =

Three ships of the United States Navy have been named Bridgeport, after the city of Bridgeport, Connecticut.

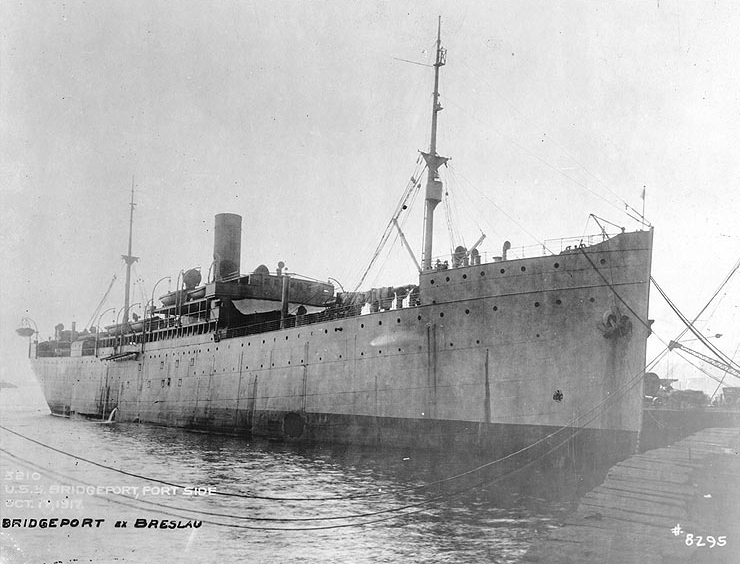
USS Bridgeport (ID 3009) at New York City on 1 October 1917

- USS Bridgeport (ID-3009 / AR-2 / AD-10), was originally the German passenger ship SS Breslau, seized during World War I and used as a troopship, then as a repair ship and a destroyer tender.
- USS Bridgeport (PG-166), a Tacoma-class patrol frigate (originally patrol gunboat), was renamed Abilene (PF-58) on 28 June 1944.
- USS Bridgeport (CA-127) was to have been an Oregon City-class heavy cruiser but construction was canceled on 12 August 1945.
