= Kochville Township, Michigan =

- Civil township
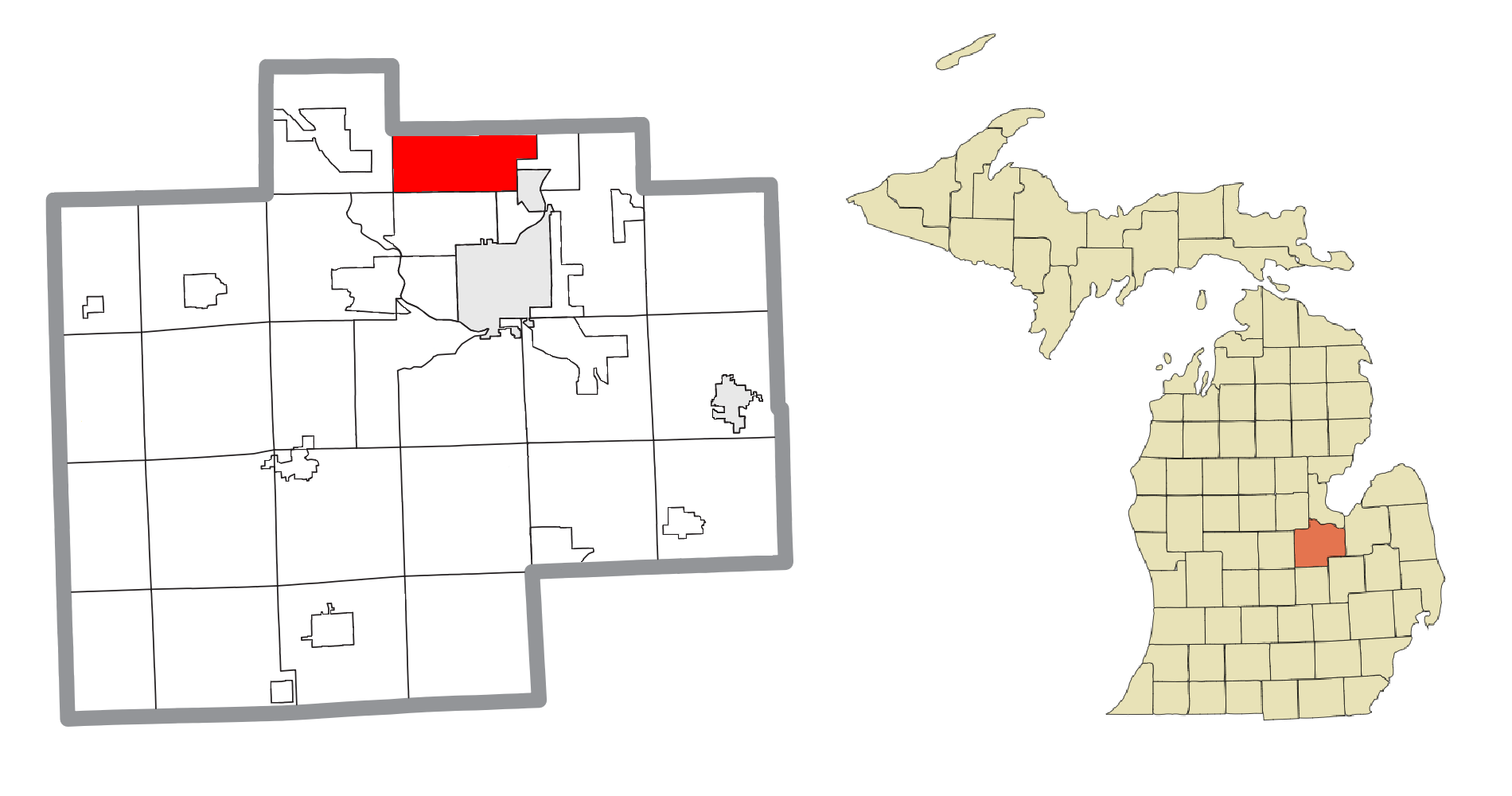
- Location within Saginaw County

- Location within the state of Michigan Kochville Township (the United States)
- Coordinates: 43°30′08″N 83°58′10″W
- Country: United States
- State: Michigan
- County: Saginaw
- Organized: 1856

Government
  - Supervisor: Alan Malesky
  - Clerk: Kevin Machata

Area
  - Total: 18.80 sq mi (48.69 km^{2})
  - Land: 18.57 sq mi (48.10 km^{2})
  - Water: 0.23 sq mi (0.59 km^{2})
- Elevation: 604 ft (184 m)

Population (2020)
  - Total: 4,911
  - Density: 264.4/sq mi (102.1/km^{2})
- Time zone: UTC-5 (Eastern (EST))
  - Summer (DST): UTC-4 (EDT)
- ZIP code(s): 48604 (Saginaw)
- Area code: 989
- FIPS code: 26-43800
- GNIS feature ID: 1626565
- Website: Official website

Kochville Township is a general law township of Saginaw County in the U.S. state of Michigan. The population was 4,911 at the 2020 census. It is the home of Saginaw Valley State University.

== Communities ==
- Kochville is an unincorporated community in the Township at Liberty and Michigan Roads. German-born Frederick Charles Koch settled here in 1849, and the township was named for him when organized in 1856. On May 15, 1890, the settlement was given a post office named "Phillips", after its first postmaster, David Phillips. The office was renamed Kochville on May 23, 1892, and continued until closing on January 31, 1901.
- Lawndale is an unincorporated community on the boundary between Kochville Township and Saginaw Township.

== Geography ==
According to the United States Census Bureau, the township has a total area of 18.8 square miles (49 km^{2}), all land.

== Demographics ==
As of the census of 2000, there were 3,241 people, 950 households, and 612 families residing in the township. The population density was 172.4 inhabitants per square mile (66.6/km^{2}). There were 990 housing units at an average density of 52.7 per square mile (20.3/km^{2}). The racial makeup of the township was 88.43% White, 6.39% African American, 0.22% Native American, 2.07% Asian, 0.03% Pacific Islander, 1.36% from other races, and 1.51% from two or more races. Hispanic or Latino of any race were 3.42% of the population.

There were 950 households, out of which 27.9% had children under the age of 18 living with them, 52.3% were married couples living together, 8.2% had a female householder with no husband present, and 35.5% were non-families. 25.5% of all households were made up of individuals, and 7.8% had someone living alone who was 65 years of age or older. The average household size was 2.48 and the average family size was 2.96.

In the township the population was spread out, with 15.9% under the age of 18, 36.3% from 18 to 24, 21.2% from 25 to 44, 18.0% from 45 to 64, and 8.5% who were 65 years of age or older. The median age was 24 years. For every 100 females, there were 94.4 males. For every 100 females age 18 and over, there were 95.1 males.

The median income for a household in the township was $42,545, and the median income for a family was $53,333. Males had a median income of $40,518 versus $20,859 for females. The per capita income for the township was $16,312. About 8.3% of families and 15.9% of the population were below the poverty line, including 22.4% of those under age 18 and 5.6% of those age 65 or over.
