= Bridgeport, Wisconsin =

- Town
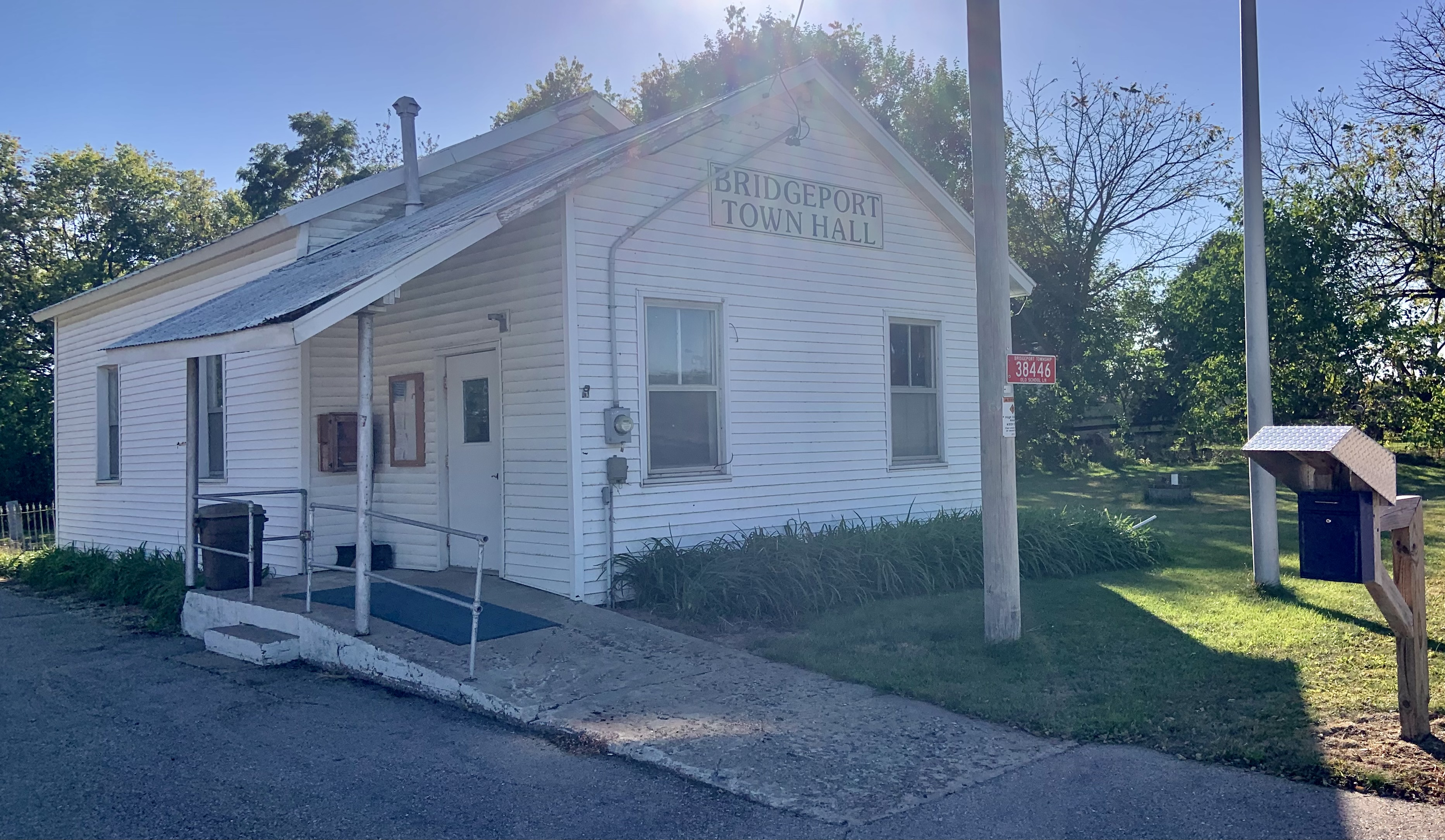
- Town hall

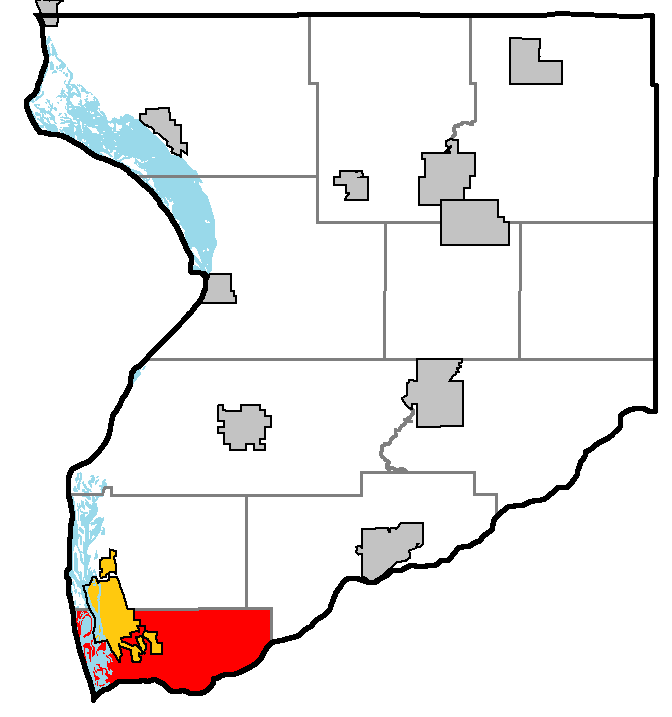
- Location of Bridgeport, within Crawford County, Wisconsin

- Location of Crawford County, Wisconsin
- Coordinates: 43°0′55″N 91°6′2″W
- Country: United States
- State: Wisconsin
- County: Crawford

Area
  - Total: 23.3 sq mi (60.4 km^{2})
  - Land: 20.3 sq mi (52.7 km^{2})
  - Water: 3.0 sq mi (7.7 km^{2})
- Elevation: 771 ft (235 m)

Population (2020)
  - Total: 988
  - Density: 48.6/sq mi (18.7/km^{2})
- Time zone: UTC-6 (Central (CST))
  - Summer (DST): UTC-5 (CDT)
- Area code: 608
- FIPS code: 55-09550
- GNIS feature ID: 1582856

Bridgeport is a town in Crawford County, Wisconsin, United States. The population was 988 at the 2020 census. The unincorporated community of Bridgeport is located in the town.

== Geography ==
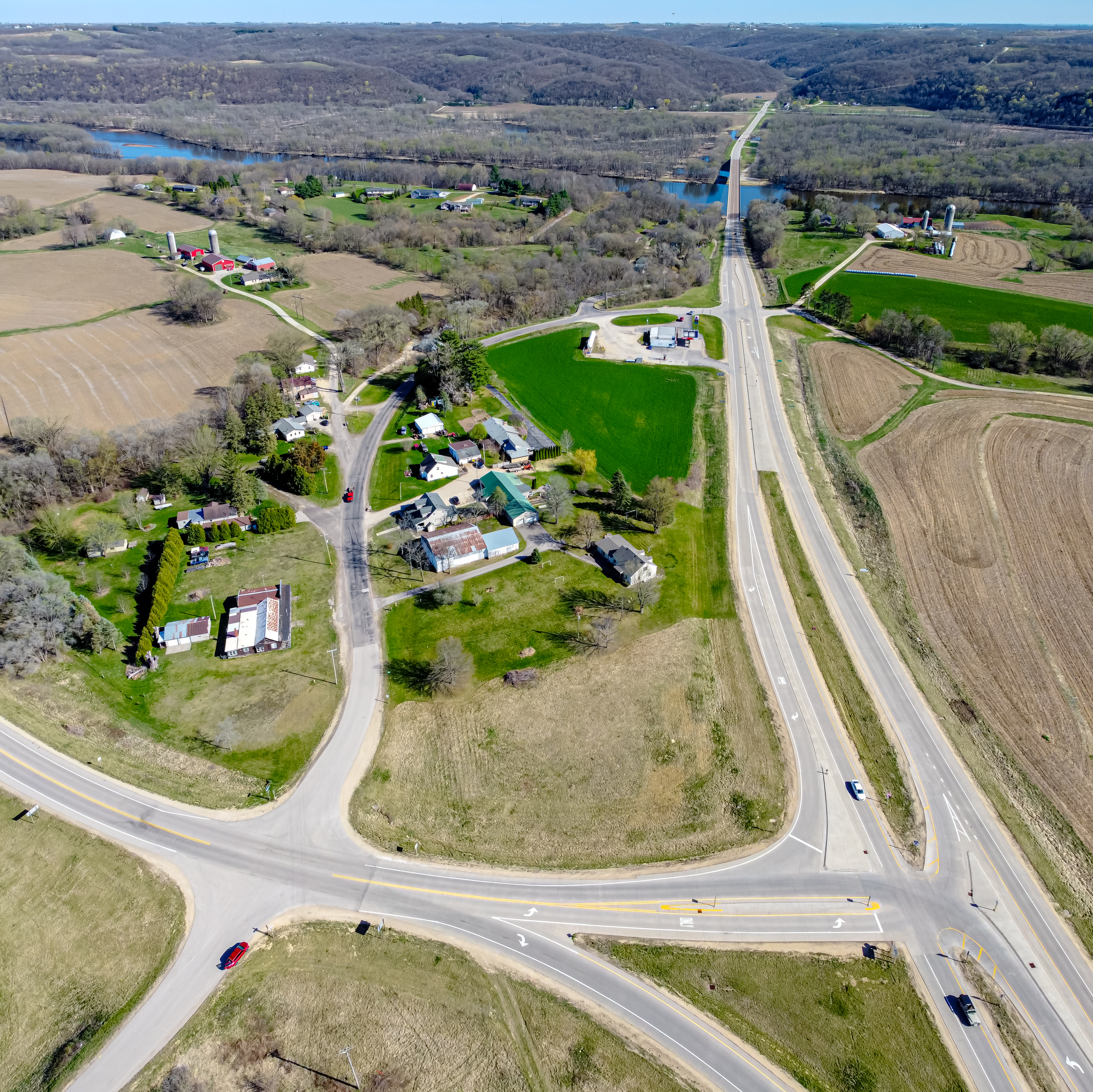
US-18 passes through town and bridges over the Wisconsin River

According to the United States Census Bureau, the town has a total area of 23.3 square miles (60.4 km^{2}), of which 20.3 square miles (52.7 km^{2}) is land and 3.0 square miles (7.7 km^{2}) (12.78%) is water.

== Demographics ==
As of the census of 2000, there were 946 people, 346 households, and 265 families residing in the town. The population density was 46.5 people per square mile (18.0/km^{2}). There were 380 housing units at an average density of 18.7 per square mile (7.2/km^{2}). The racial makeup of the town was 98.31% White, 0.11% African American, 0.42% Native American, 0.21% Asian, 0.21% from other races, and 0.74% from two or more races. Hispanic or Latino of any race were 0.21% of the population.

There were 346 households, out of which 38.2% had children under the age of 18 living with them, 69.4% were married couples living together, 5.5% had a female householder with no husband present, and 23.4% were non-families. 19.1% of all households were made up of individuals, and 6.9% had someone living alone who was 65 years of age or older. The average household size was 2.71 and the average family size was 3.12.

In the town, the population was spread out, with 29.8% under the age of 18, 5.4% from 18 to 24, 28.4% from 25 to 44, 25.5% from 45 to 64, and 10.9% who were 65 years of age or older. The median age was 37 years. For every 100 females, there were 102.6 males. For every 100 females age 18 and over, there were 97.6 males.

The median income for a household in the town was $45,313, and the median income for a family was $51,250. Males had a median income of $33,438 versus $20,909 for females. The per capita income for the town was $21,854. About 1.6% of families and 3.1% of the population were below the poverty line, including 2.1% of those under age 18 and 16.1% of those age 65 or over.

== Landmarks ==
The Bridgeport Bridge was an unusually long bridge in Bridgeport that was documented by the Historic American Engineering Record. It brought U.S. Highway 18 across the Wisconsin River in nine spans over the main channel and an additional span over a slough and an island. In 1983, it was one of the last five Pennsylvania Truss bridges in Wisconsin, but it and all but one of the others were demolished by 1993.

== In popular culture ==
Bridgeport is the scene of a lengthy pastoral episode in Clifford D. Simak's 1951 science fiction novel Time and Again. The protagonist of the novel stays in Bridgeport for ten years, between 1976 and 1986.
