= Bridgeport, Michigan =

- Census-designated place (CDP) & unincorporated community
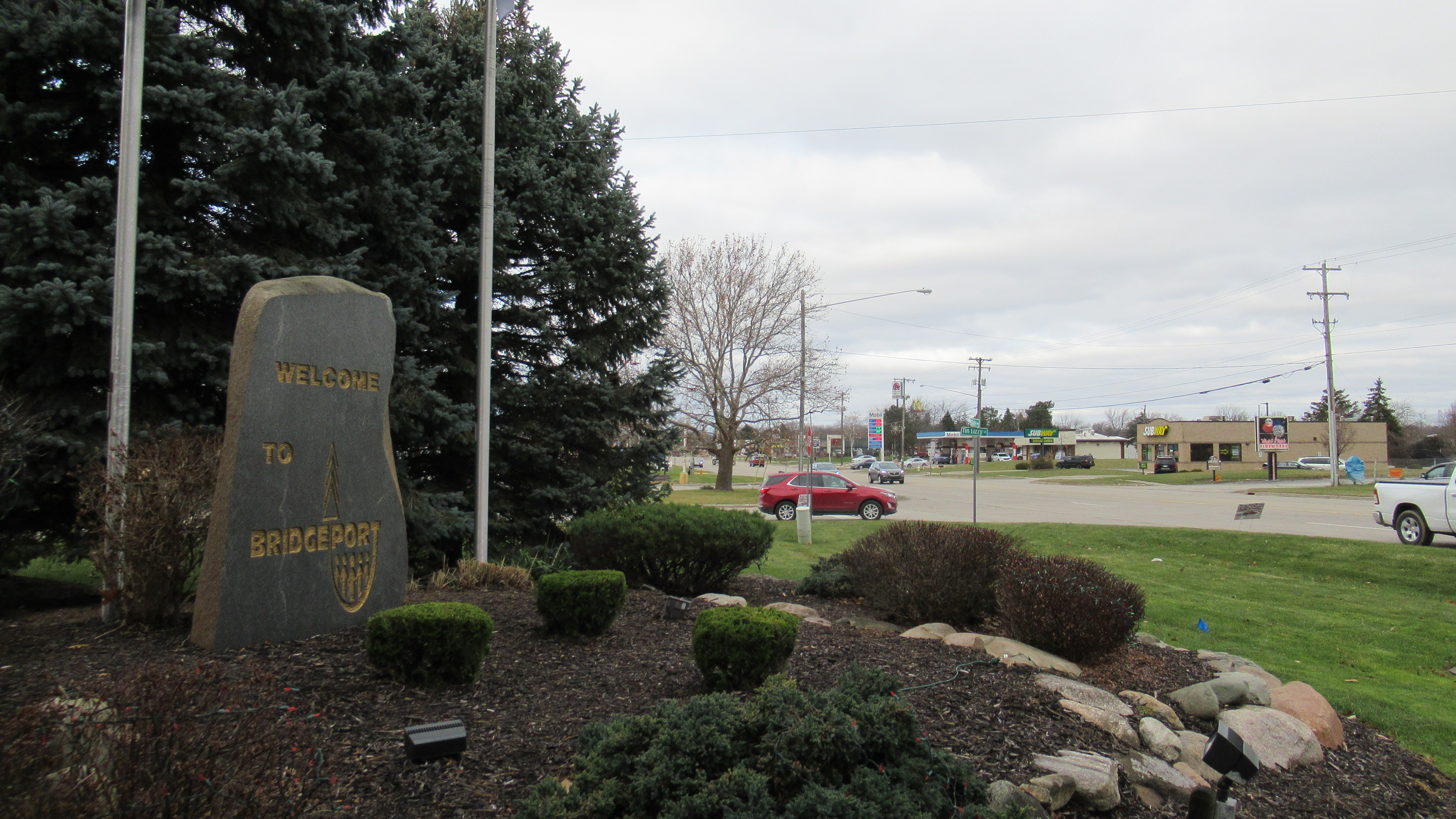
- Welcome marker along Dixie Highway

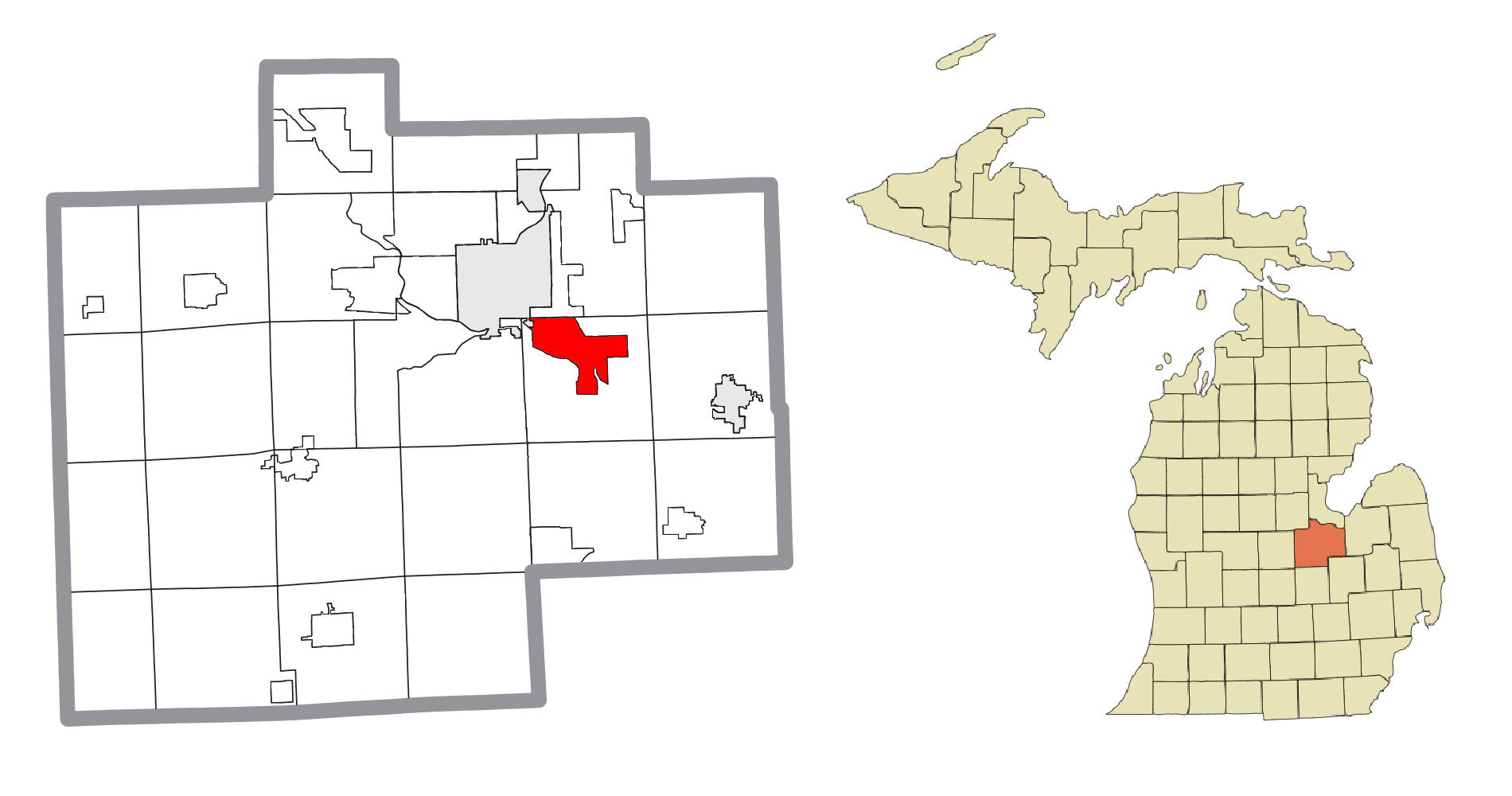
- Location within Saginaw County

- Location within the state of Michigan Bridgeport (the United States)
- Coordinates: 43°22′14″N 83°52′58″W
- Country: United States
- State: Michigan
- County: Saginaw
- Township: Bridgeport
- Established: 1836

Area
  - Total: 8.45 sq mi (21.89 km^{2})
  - Land: 8.40 sq mi (21.76 km^{2})
  - Water: 0.050 sq mi (0.13 km^{2})
- Elevation: 610 ft (190 m)

Population (2020)
  - Total: 6,571
  - Density: 782.26/sq mi (302.03/km^{2})
- Time zone: UTC-5 (Eastern (EST))
  - Summer (DST): UTC-4 (EDT)
- ZIP code(s): 48601 (Saginaw); 48722
- Area code: 989
- FIPS code: 26-10440
- GNIS feature ID: 2393346

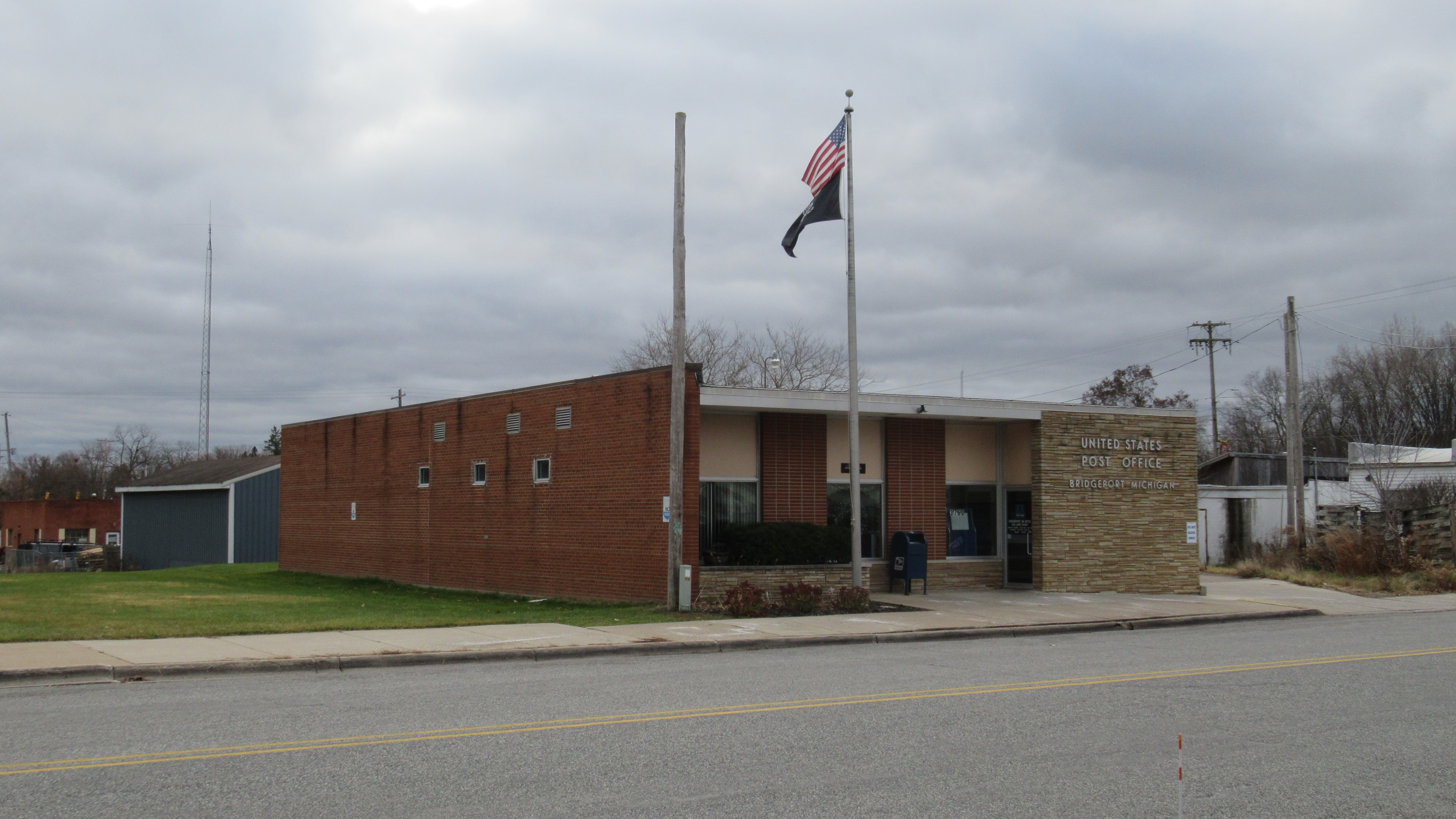
U.S. Post Office in Bridgeport

Bridgeport is an unincorporated community and census-designated place (CDP) in Saginaw County in the U.S. state of Michigan. The CDP had a population of 6,571 at the 2020 census. The community is located within Bridgeport Township.

As an unincorporated community, Bridgeport has no legal autonomy of its own but does have its own post office with the 48722 ZIP Code.

== History ==
The settlement was first known as Cass Bend due to a sharp bend along the Cass River, and a post office named Bridgeport began operating here on October 12, 1836 in the Michigan Territory. The name Bridgeport was derived from the numerous bridges that crossed the river at this point. The post office changed its name to Cass Bridge on January 30, 1864 but was later closed on January 30, 1904. The township itself also had a post office named Bridgeport Centre, which began operating on August 1, 1851. In 1880, this post office was renamed Bridgeport and has remained in operation ever since.

The Bugai Site and Schmidt Site are restricted archaeological sites near Bridgeport. The State Street Bridge is a historic bridge constructed in 1906 across the Cass River. These three locations are listed on the National Register of Historic Places.

In 2025, the Candlelite Bowling Alley and Banquet Hall, which had closed due to the effects of the COVID-19 pandemic, burned to the ground. The fire was bad enough to trigger a multi-alarm response from Bridgeport and neighboring fire departments, including from Frankenmuth, Birch Run, and the county seat in Saginaw. The cause of the fire was still under investigation, and was being overseen by the ATF.

== Geography ==
According to the U.S Census Bureau, the CDP has a total area of 8.45 square miles (21.89 km^{2}), of which 8.40 square miles (21.76 km^{2}) is land and 0.05 square miles (0.13 km^{2}) (0.59%) is water.

The community is located approximately halfway between the cities of Saginaw to the northwest and Frankenmuth to the east. The Cass River flows through the center of the community.

=== Major highways ===
- I-75 / US 23 runs south–north through the western portion of the community and has access points at Dixie Highway exit 144A and 144B.

== Demographics ==
Historical population
Census	Pop.	Note	%±
1990	8,569		—
2000	7,849		−8.4%
2010	6,950		−11.5%
2020	6,571		−5.5%
U.S. Decennial Census

=== 2020 census ===
As of the 2020 census, Bridgeport had a population of 6,571. The median age was 42.5 years. 22.1% of residents were under the age of 18 and 20.7% were 65 years of age or older. For every 100 females there were 89.7 males, and for every 100 females age 18 and over there were 85.2 males age 18 and over.

88.4% of residents lived in urban areas, while 11.6% lived in rural areas.

There were 2,786 households in Bridgeport, of which 27.2% had children under the age of 18 living in them. Of all households, 33.9% were married-couple households, 20.6% were households with a male householder and no spouse or partner present, and 37.0% were households with a female householder and no spouse or partner present. About 32.8% of all households were made up of individuals and 14.6% had someone living alone who was 65 years of age or older.

There were 3,013 housing units, of which 7.5% were vacant. The homeowner vacancy rate was 1.8% and the rental vacancy rate was 10.2%.

Racial composition as of the 2020 census
Race	Number	Percent
White	3,435	52.3%
Black or African American	2,364	36.0%
American Indian and Alaska Native	34	0.5%
Asian	29	0.4%
Native Hawaiian and Other Pacific Islander	0	0.0%
Some other race	228	3.5%
Two or more races	481	7.3%
Hispanic or Latino (of any race)	722	11.0%

=== 2000 census ===
As of the 2000 census, there were 7,849 people, 3,022 households, and 2,106 families residing in the CDP. The population density was 941.4 inhabitants per square mile (363.5/km^{2}). There were 3,136 housing units at an average density of 376.1 per square mile (145.2/km^{2}). The racial makeup of the CDP was 64.05% White, 28.59% African American, 0.54% Native American, 0.24% Asian, 3.83% from other races, and 2.75% from two or more races. Hispanic or Latino of any race were 10.29% of the population.

There were 3,022 households, out of which 31.7% had children under the age of 18 living with them, 47.6% were married couples living together, 17.9% had a female householder with no husband present, and 30.3% were non-families. 26.1% of all households were made up of individuals, and 8.6% had someone living alone who was 65 years of age or older. The average household size was 2.54 and the average family size was 3.03.

In the CDP, the population was spread out, with 26.2% under the age of 18, 8.8% from 18 to 24, 25.7% from 25 to 44, 26.0% from 45 to 64, and 13.2% who were 65 years of age or older. The median age was 38 years. For every 100 females, there were 87.2 males. For every 100 females age 18 and over, there were 83.5 males.

The median income for a household in the CDP was $37,515, and the median income for a family was $45,691. Males had a median income of $36,825 versus $22,790 for females. The per capita income for the CDP was $19,797. About 9.1% of families and 11.3% of the population were below the poverty line, including 17.1% of those under age 18 and 7.4% of those age 65 or over.

== Education ==
Bridgeport is served by Bridgeport-Spaulding Community School District, and Bridgeport High School is located within the community.

== Notable people ==
- Monty Brown, retired professional wrestler and American football player
- Ferdinand Brucker, lawyer and politician
- David R. Gilmour, diplomat and current Ambassador to Equatorial Guinea
- David Haas, author and composer of contemporary Catholic liturgical music
