= Spaulding Township, Michigan =

- Civil township
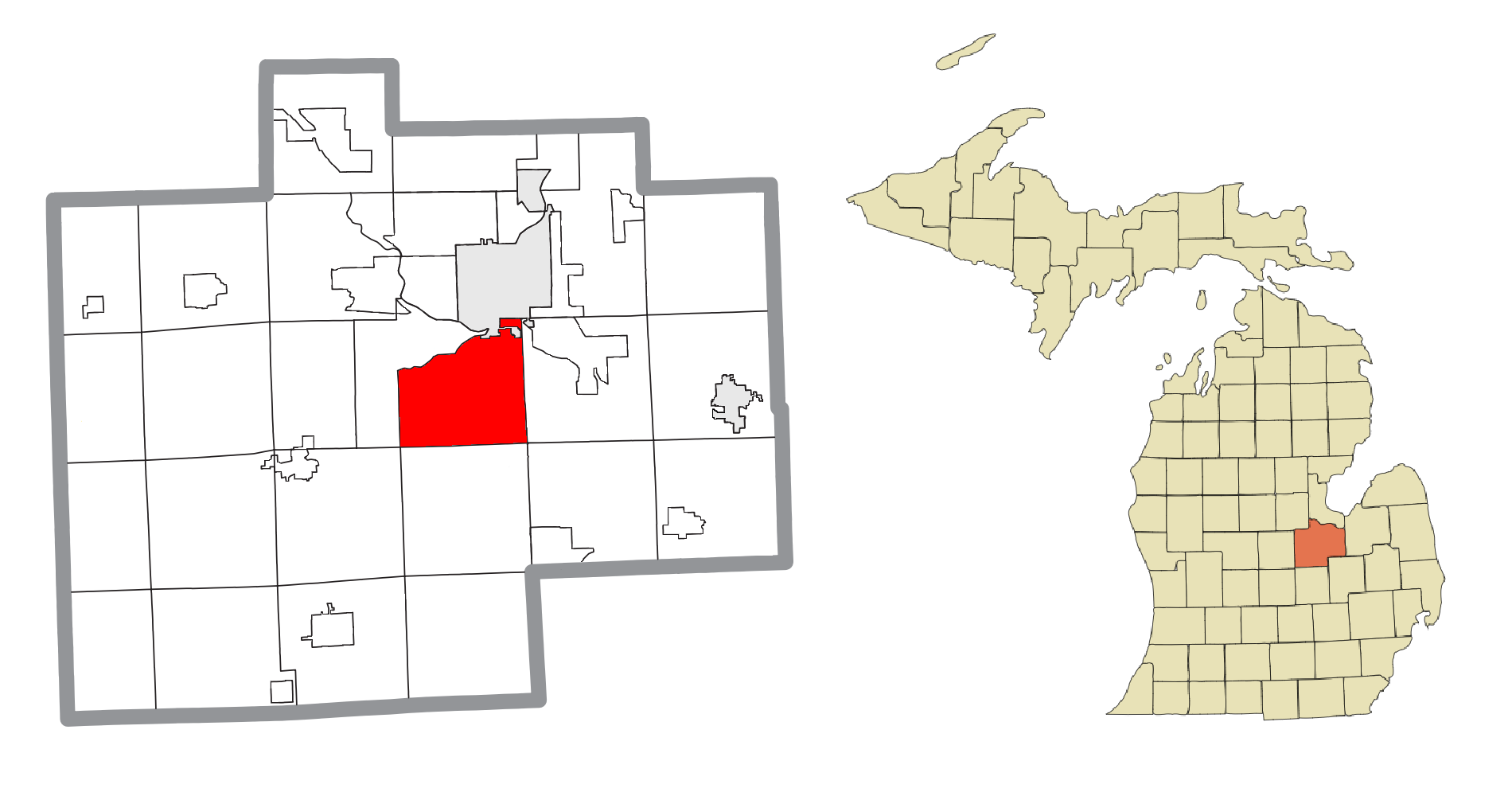
- Location within Saginaw County

- Location within the state of Michigan Spaulding Township (the United States)
- Coordinates: 43°21′20″N 83°58′34″W
- Country: United States
- State: Michigan
- County: Saginaw
- Settled: 1832
- Established: 1858

Government
  - Supervisor: Ed Masters
  - Clerk: Mark Seamon

Area
  - Total: 27.4 sq mi (70.9 km^{2})
  - Land: 26.6 sq mi (68.8 km^{2})
  - Water: 0.81 sq mi (2.1 km^{2})
- Elevation: 590 ft (180 m)

Population (2020)
  - Total: 1,975
  - Density: 74.3/sq mi (28.7/km^{2})
- Time zone: UTC-5 (Eastern (EST))
  - Summer (DST): UTC-4 (EDT)
- ZIP code(s): 48601, 48609 (Saginaw)
- Area code: 989
- FIPS code: 26-75480
- GNIS feature ID: 1627103
- Website: Official website

Spaulding Township is a civil township of Saginaw County in the U.S. state of Michigan. The population was 1,975 at the 2020 Census.

== Geography ==
According to the United States Census Bureau, the township has a total area of 27.4 square miles (71 km^{2}), of which 26.6 square miles (69 km^{2}) is land and 0.8 square miles (2.1 km^{2}) (2.96%) is water. The township's northwestern boundary follows the Shiawassee River, and its tributaries the Flint and Cass rivers flow through the township. The mouth of Misteguay Creek, a Flint River tributary, is located in the southern part of the township.

== History ==
Albert Miller was the first settler of Spaulding Township. He moved to the area in 1832. Upon the organization of Saginaw County in 1835, Miller was appointed Judge of Probate and Justice of the Peace. He was also a member of the state legislature in 1847 and the first president of the Michigan Pioneer Society.

Spaulding Township was named after Phineas Spalding. Spalding moved to the area in May 1834 with his wife, Belinda. The area now known as Spaulding Township was not designated as such until December 30, 1858.

The Shiawassee National Wildlife Refuge was established in March 1953. The only public entrance into the refuge is off West Curtis Road in Spaulding Township. The refuge consists of over 8,850 acres (35.8 km^{2}) and was established to protect migratory bird habitats.

The Spaulding Township Volunteer Fire Department has provided service to the township since 1955.

== Demographics ==
As of the census of 2000, there were 2,399 people, 900 households, and 676 families residing in the township. The population density was 90.3 inhabitants per square mile (34.9/km^{2}). There were 926 housing units at an average density of 34.9 per square mile (13.5/km^{2}). The racial makeup of the township was 79.41% White, 12.92% African American, 0.67% Native American, 0.42% Asian, 3.71% from other races, and 2.88% from two or more races. Hispanic or Latino of any race were 13.26% of the population.

There were 900 households, out of which 29.4% had children under the age of 18 living with them, 58.6% were married couples living together, 12.3% had a female householder with no husband present, and 24.8% were non-families. 21.6% of all households were made up of individuals, and 7.9% had someone living alone who was 65 years of age or older. The average household size was 2.64 and the average family size was 3.02.

In the township the population was spread out, with 25.0% under the age of 18, 6.7% from 18 to 24, 26.9% from 25 to 44, 28.0% from 45 to 64, and 13.5% who were 65 years of age or older. The median age was 40 years. For every 100 females, there were 92.8 males. For every 100 females age 18 and over, there were 91.3 males.

The median income for a household in the township was $36,791, and the median income for a family was $42,794. Males had a median income of $37,619 versus $20,911 for females. The per capita income for the township was $17,910. About 7.7% of families and 9.3% of the population were below the poverty line, including 12.8% of those under age 18 and 8.3% of those age 65 or over.
