= Bridgeport Charter Township, Michigan =

- Charter township
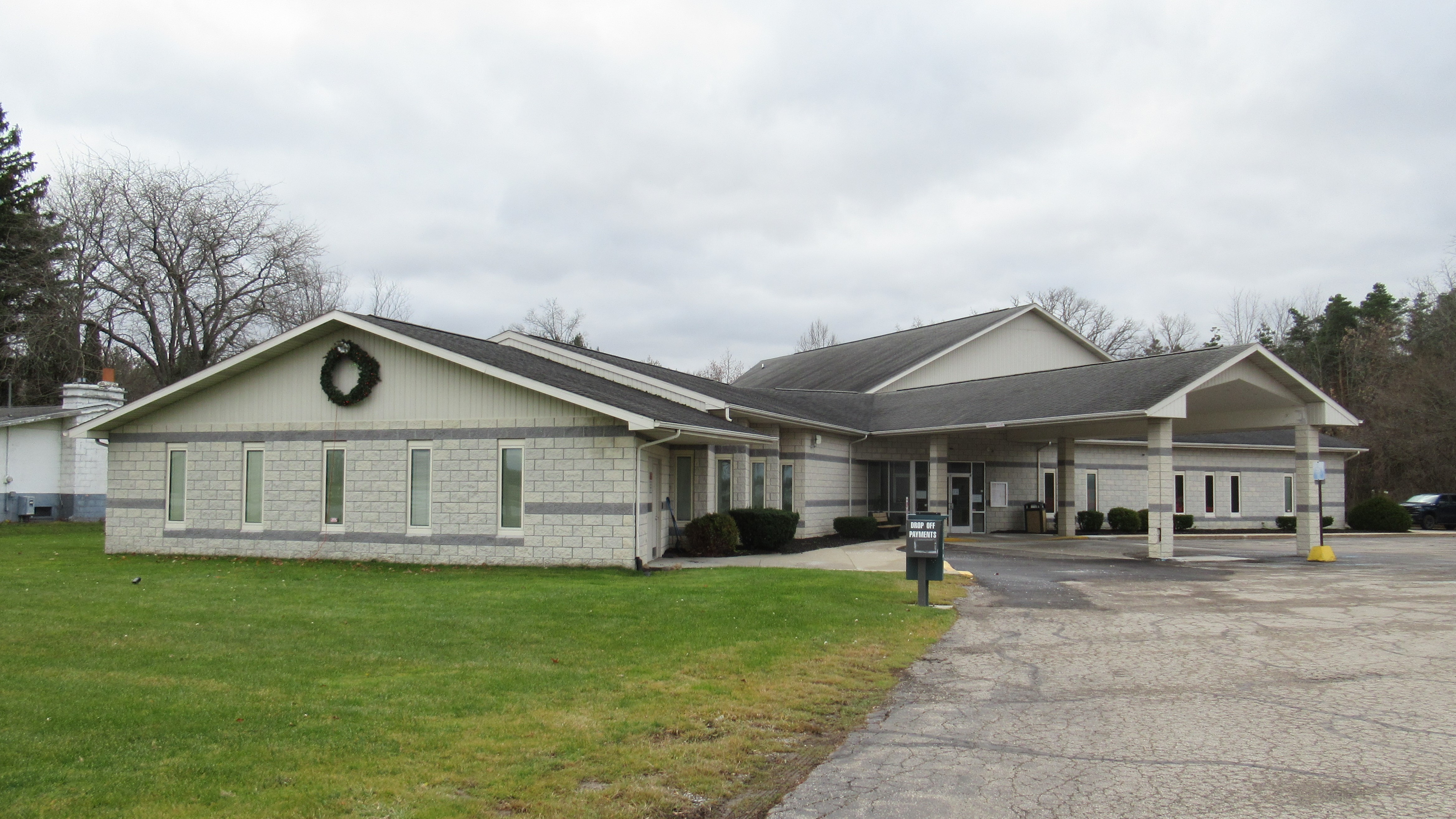
- Government offices in Bridgeport

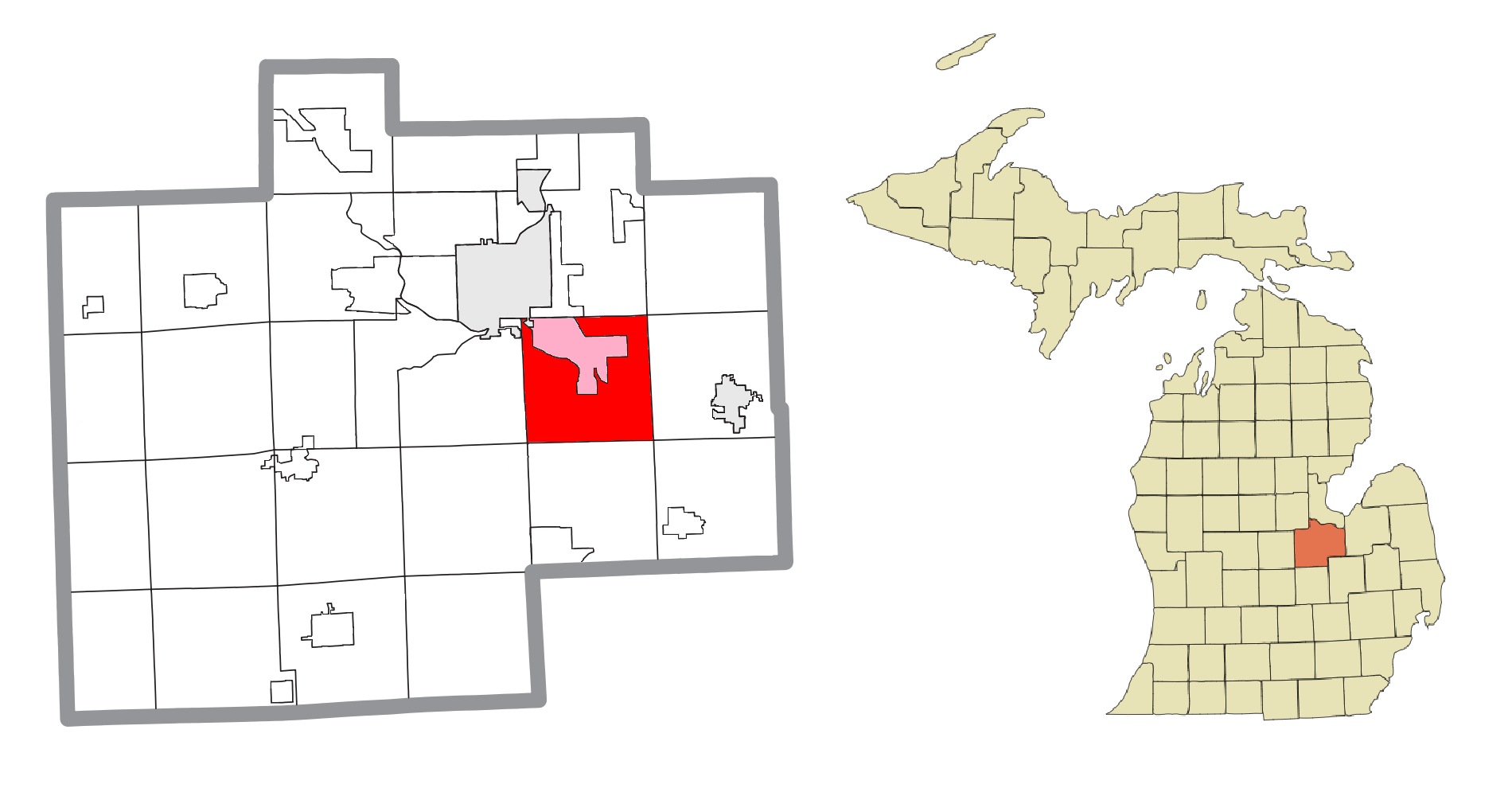
- Location within Saginaw County (red) and the administered CDP of Bridgeport (pink)

- Location within the state of Michigan Location within the United States
- Coordinates: 43°21′42″N 83°53′07″W
- Country: United States
- State: Michigan
- County: Saginaw
- Established: 1848

Government
  - Supervisor: August Tausend
  - Clerk: Lee Carpenter

Area
  - Total: 34.87 sq mi (90.31 km^{2})
  - Land: 34.43 sq mi (89.17 km^{2})
  - Water: 0.44 sq mi (1.14 km^{2})
- Elevation: 587 ft (179 m)

Population (2020)
  - Total: 10,104
  - Density: 293.5/sq mi (113.3/km^{2})
- Time zone: UTC-5 (Eastern (EST))
  - Summer (DST): UTC-4 (EDT)
- ZIP code(s): 48415 (Birch Run); 48601 (Saginaw); 48722 (Bridgeport)
- Area code: 989
- FIPS code: 26-10460
- GNIS feature ID: 1625977
- Website: Official website

Bridgeport Charter Township is a charter township of Saginaw County in the U.S. state of Michigan. The population was 10,104 at the 2020 census.

== History ==
Bridgeport Township was established in 1848. A sawmill was built there in 1849. By the mid-1860s there was also a shingle mill, three shingle factories and a salt well. By the 1880s the area had shifted to farming with the only mill being a grist mill built in 1878 by John and Martin Messner.

== Geography ==
Bridgeport is a census-designated place and an unincorporated community covering the township from the city of Saginaw in the northwest, south along Interstate 75 to the center of the township.

According to the United States Census Bureau, the township has a total area of 34.7 square miles (90 km^{2}), of which 34.6 square miles (90 km^{2}) is land and 0.1 square miles (0.26 km^{2}) (0.23%) is water.

== Demographics ==
Historical population
Census	Pop.	Note	%±
2000	11,709		—
2010	10,514		−10.2%
2020	10,104		−3.9%

As of the census of 2000, there were 11,709 people, 4,488 households, and 3,235 families residing in the township. The population density was 338.1 inhabitants per square mile (130.5/km^{2}). There were 4,669 housing units at an average density of 134.8 per square mile (52.0/km^{2}). The racial makeup of the township was 72.58% White, 20.65% African American, 0.61% Native American, 0.32% Asian, 0.01% Pacific Islander, 3.26% from other races, and 2.56% from two or more races. Hispanic or Latino of any race were 9.05% of the population.

There were 4,488 households, out of which 31.1% had children under the age of 18 living with them, 52.6% were married couples living together, 15.2% had a female householder with no husband present, and 27.9% were non-families. 23.8% of all households were made up of individuals, and 7.9% had someone living alone who was 65 years of age or older. The average household size was 2.57 and the average family size was 3.02.

In the township the population was spread out, with 25.3% under the age of 18, 8.6% from 18 to 24, 26.2% from 25 to 44, 27.0% from 45 to 64, and 12.8% who were 65 years of age or older. The median age was 38 years. For every 100 females, there were 90.6 males. For every 100 females age 18 and over, there were 87.1 males.

The median income for a household in the township was $39,765, and the median income for a family was $46,360. Males had a median income of $37,727 versus $23,228 for females. The per capita income for the township was $19,760. About 7.3% of families and 9.4% of the population were below the poverty line, including 13.4% of those under age 18 and 6.3% of those age 65 or over.

== Education ==
Bridgeport-Spaulding Community School District operates public schools in the area.
