= Destination and specialty Build-A-Bear locations =

Specialty Build-A-Bear Workshop locations

Build-A-Bear Workshop operates several locations, store formats, and other themed experiences that operate outside the company’s traditional retail stores. These have included partnerships with resorts, cruise lines, theme parks, sports venues, restaurants, tourist attractions, and other entertainment destinations.

== Specialty workshops ==
Build-A-Bear has introduced a number of specialty workshop formats through partnerships with attractions, entertainment venues, sports organizations, restaurants, retailers, and licensed properties.

=== Friends 2B Made ===
Friends 2B Made was an interactive retail concept introduced by Build-A-Bear Workshop in 2005 that allowed customers to create dolls and purchase related clothing and accessories. At its peak, the concept operated in nine standalone stores and in dedicated sections within dozens of Build-A-Bear locations. Customers could personalize dolls with a variety of fashions, accessories, and other customizable features. Unlike Build-A-Bear Workshop's traditional Stuffed animal animal line, Friends 2B Made focused on dolls and fashion-themed play experiences aimed at older children.

The concept was discontinued in 2009, with standalone stores either closing or being converted into Build-A-Bear Workshop locations.

=== Build-A-Dino ===
Build-A-Dino is a Build-A-Bear Workshop concept that allows customers to create stuffed dinosaurs and purchase themed accessories.

The first Build-A-Dino location opened inside the T-Rex Café in Kansas City, Missouri, as part of a partnership with Landry's Restaurants. A temporary standalone location later operated at Chesterfield Mall in Chesterfield, Missouri, before being relocated to the St. Louis Science Center.

Additional Build-A-Dino locations were opened inside T-Rex Café restaurants, including a location at Disney Springs in Walt Disney World. Build-A-Dino sections have also operated within selected Build-A-Bear Workshop stores. Build-A-Dino locations offer dinosaur-themed plush toys known as "Friendosaurs", which can be customized with clothing, accessories, sounds, and recorded messages.

=== Make Your Own Mascot ===
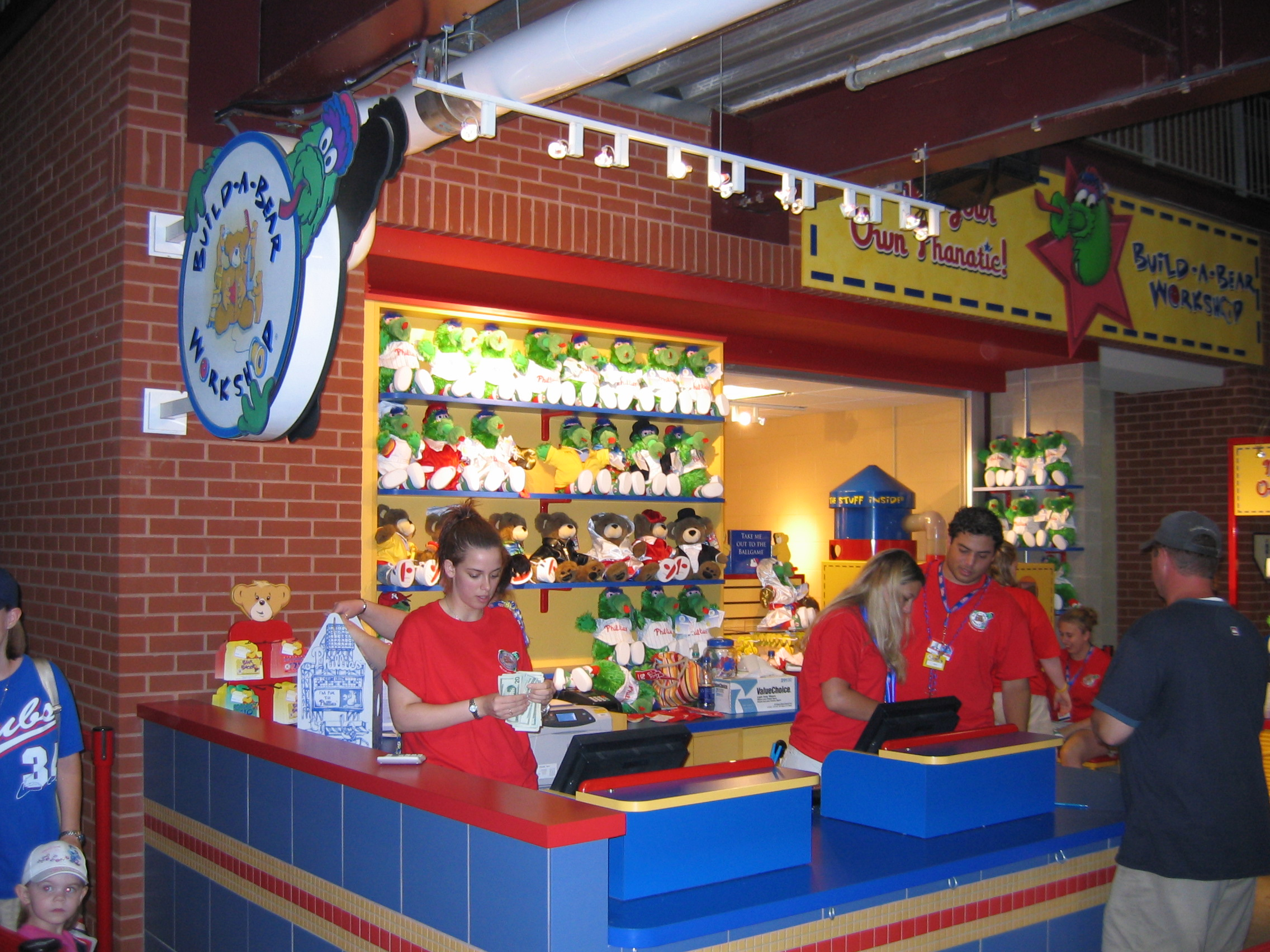
The "Make Your Own Phanatic" shop at Citizens Bank Park in Philadelphia, now closed.

Build-A-Bear Workshop opened a series of "Make Your Own Mascot" locations featuring professional sports Sports mascots and related merchandise.

Locations operated at several Major League Baseball venues, including Progressive Field, Great American Ball Park, AT&T Park, Nationals Park, and Busch Stadium. Similar mascot-themed offerings were also available for characters such as Wally the Green Monster and Mr. Met. The concept expanded through partnerships with Major League Baseball teams and featured team-specific bears, mascots, clothing, accessories, and other licensed merchandise sold at participating stadium locations.

=== Build-A-Bear Workshop At Sea ===
Build-A-Bear Workshop At Sea is an onboard attraction offered on Carnival Cruise Line ships. The program was introduced in 2016 through a partnership between Build-A-Bear Workshop and Carnival Cruise Line.

Guests can create and customize stuffed animals during scheduled onboard events. The experience includes a Carnival-exclusive bear design and a St. Jude Bear, with proceeds benefiting St. Jude Children's Research Hospital.

=== Kiosks ===
Build-A-Bear Workshop has operated kiosk-format locations in shopping malls in addition to its traditional stores. These smaller locations offer the company's stuffed-animal customization experience in a reduced retail footprint.

=== Hello Kitty & Friends Workshop ===
In November 2024, Build-A-Bear Workshop and Sanrio opened the first Build-A-Bear x Hello Kitty and Friends Workshop at Westfield Century City in Los Angeles, California.

The store features Sanrio-themed merchandise and experiences centered on characters including Hello Kitty, Cinnamoroll, Kuromi, and My Melody.

In December 2025, Build-A-Bear announced plans to expand the concept with additional locations at American Dream in New Jersey and Mall Mall of America in Minnesota.

== Retail partnerships ==
Build-A-Bear Workshop has operated locations through partnerships with a variety of retailers. These locations are typically situated within existing retail stores and offer the company's traditional make-your-own stuffed animal experience in a shop-in-shop format.

=== Build-A-Bear at Walmart ===
Build-A-Bear operated temporary pop-up Workshop locations inside Walmart stores during the 2018 and 2019 Holiday seasons. The program began with six pilot locations in 2018 and expanded to 25 stores in 2019. The pop-up Workshops were discontinued after the seasonal test concluded, and no permanent Build-A-Bear Workshop locations remained inside Walmart stores after 2019.

=== FAO Schwarz ===
Build-A-Bear operates a location within the FAO Schwarz flagship stores in New York City and United Kingdom. The location opened as part of Build-A-Bear’s expansion into destination-based and tourist-focused venues. Build-A-Bear announced that the FAO Schwarz location would offer exclusive FAO Schwarz plush products and themed accessories in addition to the company’s traditional experience.

=== Hamleys ===
Build-A-Bear Workshop has operated locations within selected Hamleys toy stores in the United Kingdom through a retail partnership with the retailer. Locations have included Hamleys of London on Regent Street , Hamleys Westfield in London, and Hamleys St Enoch in Glasgow.

=== Selfridges ===
Build-A-Bear Workshop has operated locations within Selfridges department stores in the United Kingdom as part of the company's expansion through retail partnerships. Build-A-Bear locations have been listed at Selfridges stores in London and Birmingham, allowing customers to participate in the company's traditional make-your-own stuffed animal experience within existing Selfridges retail locations.

=== ToySmart ===
Build-A-Bear operates a partner-operated location within a ToySmart store in Bogotá, Colombia. The store is operated under Build-A-Bear's international partner model, in which locations are managed by third-party retailers rather than directly by the company. According to Build-A-Bear location information, the Bogotá location is operated within an existing ToySmart retail store rather than as a standalone Build-A-Bear Workshop.

== Destination locations ==
Build-A-Bear Workshop has expanded beyond traditional retail stores through locations at resorts, amusement parks, entertainment complexes, and tourist destinations.

=== Great Wolf Lodge ===
Build-A-Bear Workshop locations operate at several Great Wolf Lodge Resorts These locations offer Great Wolf Lodge-themed merchandise and plush characters based on the resort's Great Wolf Pack characters, including Wiley Wolf, Violet Wolf, Brinley Bear, Sammy Squirrel and Oliver Raccoon. Great Wolf Lodge locations were among a number of destination-based Build-A-Bear locations opened as part of the company's expansion into entertainment and tourism venues.

=== Kalahari Resorts ===
Build-A-Bear Workshop operates locations at selected Kalahari Resorts properties as part of the company’s expansion into destination and entertainment venues. Kalahari locations are among a number of resort-based Build-A-Bear destinations developed outside the company’s traditional retail store model.

=== Tivoli Gardens ===
Build-A-Bear Workshop previously operated a location within Tivoli Gardens in Copenhagen, Denmark. The location was one of the company's amusement park partnerships outside North America.

=== Cedar Fair parks ===
Build-A-Bear Workshop has operated locations at several Cedar Fair Amusement Parks, including Cedar Point, Kings Island, and Kings Dominion. In announcing the opening of a Cedar Point location in 2022, Build-A-Bear described the store as the fourth Build-A-Bear Workshop within a Cedar Fair amusement park property.

=== Knott's Berry Farm ===
Build-A-Bear Workshop opened a location at Knott's Berry Farm in Buena Parkk, California, on January 28, 2020. The store is located in the California Marketplace area of the park, behind Virginia's Gift Shop and Mrs. Knott's Chicken Dinner Restaurant.

To reflect Knott's western theme, the location debuted with exclusive cowboy-, cowgirl-, and train conductor-themed bears. The store also offers limited-edition merchandise tied to Knott's Berry Farm's seasonal events.

=== Six Flags parks ===
Build-A-Bear Workshop has also operated locations at selected Six Flags Parks as part of its expansion into amusement park destinations. These locations extended the company’s presence in the regional theme park industry alongside its locations at Cedar Fair Parks.

=== Build-A-Bear Workshop at SeaWorld ===
Build-A-Bear Workshop operates a location at SeaWorld Orlando in Orlando, Florida. The location opened in 2021 and is situated in the park's Key West area. In addition to the company's traditional make-your-own stuffed animal experience, the workshop offers SeaWorld-exclusive with clothing, accessories, and other merchandise themed to the park.

=== The Island in Pigeon Forge ===
Build-A-Bear operates a location at The Island in Pigeon Forge, an entertainment complex in Pigeon Forge, Tennessee.

=== Wisconsin Dells ===
Build-A-Bear operates a location at Outlets at the Dells in Baraboo, Wisconsin, serving the Wisconsin Dells tourism region. The location offers the company’s traditional make-your-own stuffed animal experience and is marketed as a destination workshop for visitors to the area.

=== Myrtle Beach ===
Build-A-Bear operates a location at Broadway at the Beach in Myrtle Beach, South Carolina. The location offers the company’s traditional make-your-own stuffed animal experience and is situated within one of Myrtle Beach’s largest entertainment and tourist destinations.

Broadway at the Beach describes the location as an interactive attraction where guests create and personalize stuffed animals with clothing, accessories, sounds, and other customization options.

=== Build-A-Bear Adventure ===
Build-A-Bear Adventure is an entertainment venue operated by Build-A-Bear Workshop in Chesterfield, Missouri. Opened in 2022, the facility combines a Build-A-Bear Workshop with party rooms, arcade games, selfie room, and other family attractions.

The venue also includes the Build-A-Bear Bakeshop, which offers cupcake-decorating activities and baking-themed programs for children.

=== ICON Park ===
Build-A-Bear operates a location at ICON Park on International Drive in Orlando, Florida. The location offers the company’s traditional make-your-own stuffed animal experience and serves visitors to one of Orlando’s major entertainment and tourism destinations.

In 2025, Build-A-Bear announced plans to expand its presence at ICON Park with a multi-level retail experience scheduled to open in 2026.

=== Bavarian Inn ===
Build-A-Bear Workshop opened a location at Bavarian Inn Lodge in Frankenmuth, Michigan, on July 17, 2024. The location was introduced as part of the resort’s family entertainment offerings and waterpark expansion project.

The workshop is located within the Bavarian Inn Lodge Family Fun Center and offers the company’s traditional make-your-own stuffed animal experience, including the Heart Ceremony.

=== Gaylord Resorts ===
In 2018, Build-A-Bear announced plans to open permanent locations at Gaylord Hotels properties as part of its expansion into family-friendly destinations.
