= Carl Ferdinand Appun =

German naturalist (1820–1872)

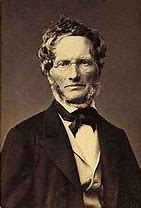
Carl Ferdinand Appun

Carl Ferdinand Appun (24 May 1820, Bunzlau- July 1872, Guyana) was a German naturalist. On the recommendation of Alexander von Humboldt Appun was employed by Frederick William IV of Prussia as a botanist in Venezuela where excepting a one-year break in Germany, he spent ten years exploring the flora. After that he went to British Guayana, where he researched as a botanist on behalf the British government. He also visited parts of Brazil -the Rio Branco and Rio Negro on the Amazon to Tabatinga. During a visit in Germany (1868–1871) he published a set of essays in different magazines . His best known work Unter den Tropen (Under the Tropics) was at that time extremely popular. In 1871 he undertook a second exploration of Guyana, where he had an accident which led to his death. His last writings were essays about Indigenous peoples in Venezuela. Appun described many new plant species and is also known as an entomologist.

== Works ==
- Über die Behandlung von Sämerein und Pflanzen des tropischen Süd-Amerika, besonders Venezuela’s. Bunzlau 1858
- Unter den Tropen: Wanderungen durch Venezuela, am Orinoco, durch Britisch Guyana und am Amazonenstrome in den Jahren 1849-1868. Jena: Costenoble, 1871.
- Venezuela. Jena: Costenoble, 1871. Unter den Tropen; 1.
- Britisch Guyana. Jena: Costenoble, 1871. Unter den Tropen; 2.
- with Eduard Raimund Baierlein Bei den Indianern. Berlin; Leipzig: Hillger, 1915. Deutsche Jugendbücherei; Nr 104

== Collections ==
The Museum für Naturkunde contains Diptera collected by Appun in Colombia.
