= Frankenmuth Township, Michigan =

- Civil township
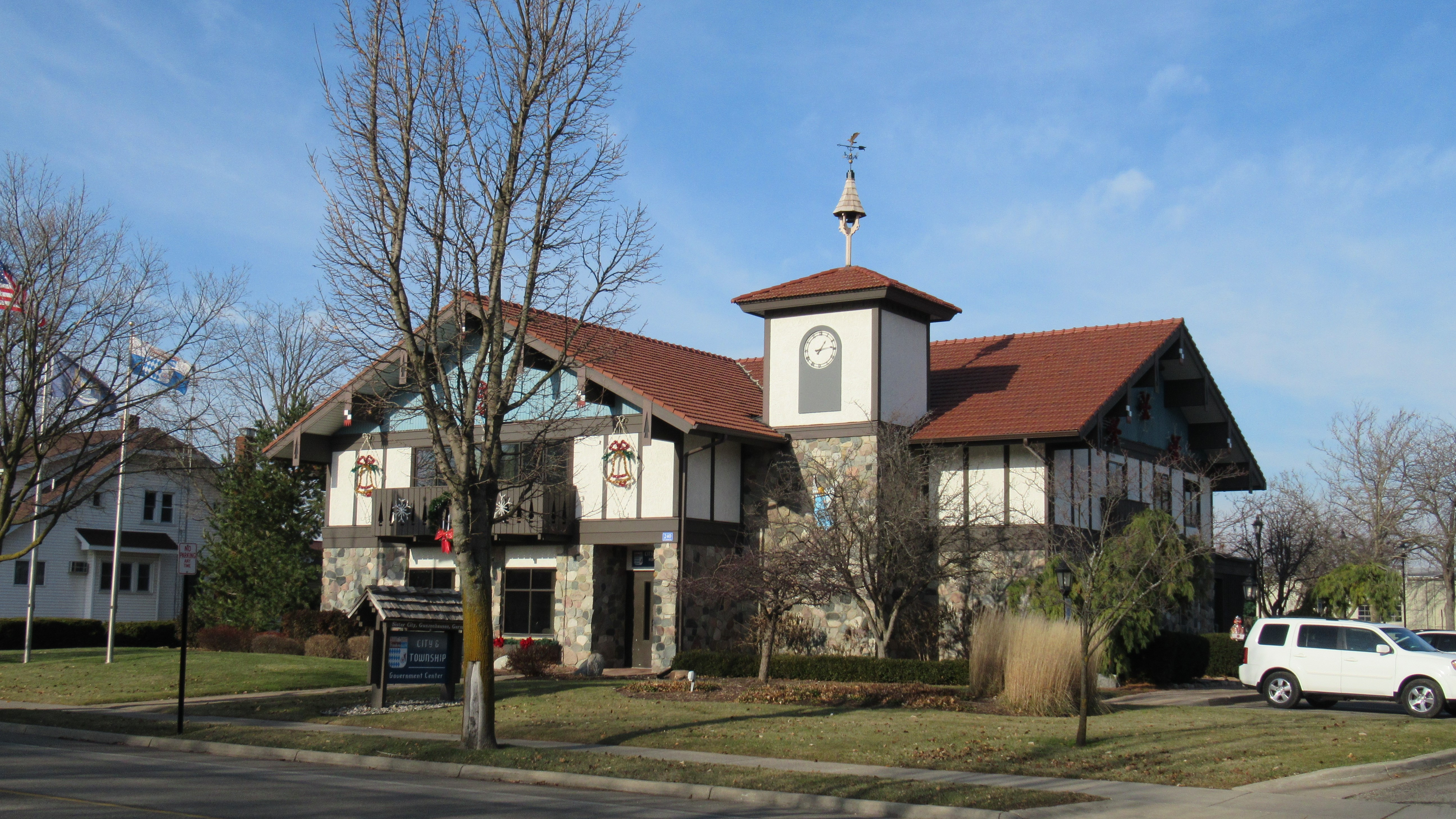
- Frankemuth City & Township Government Center

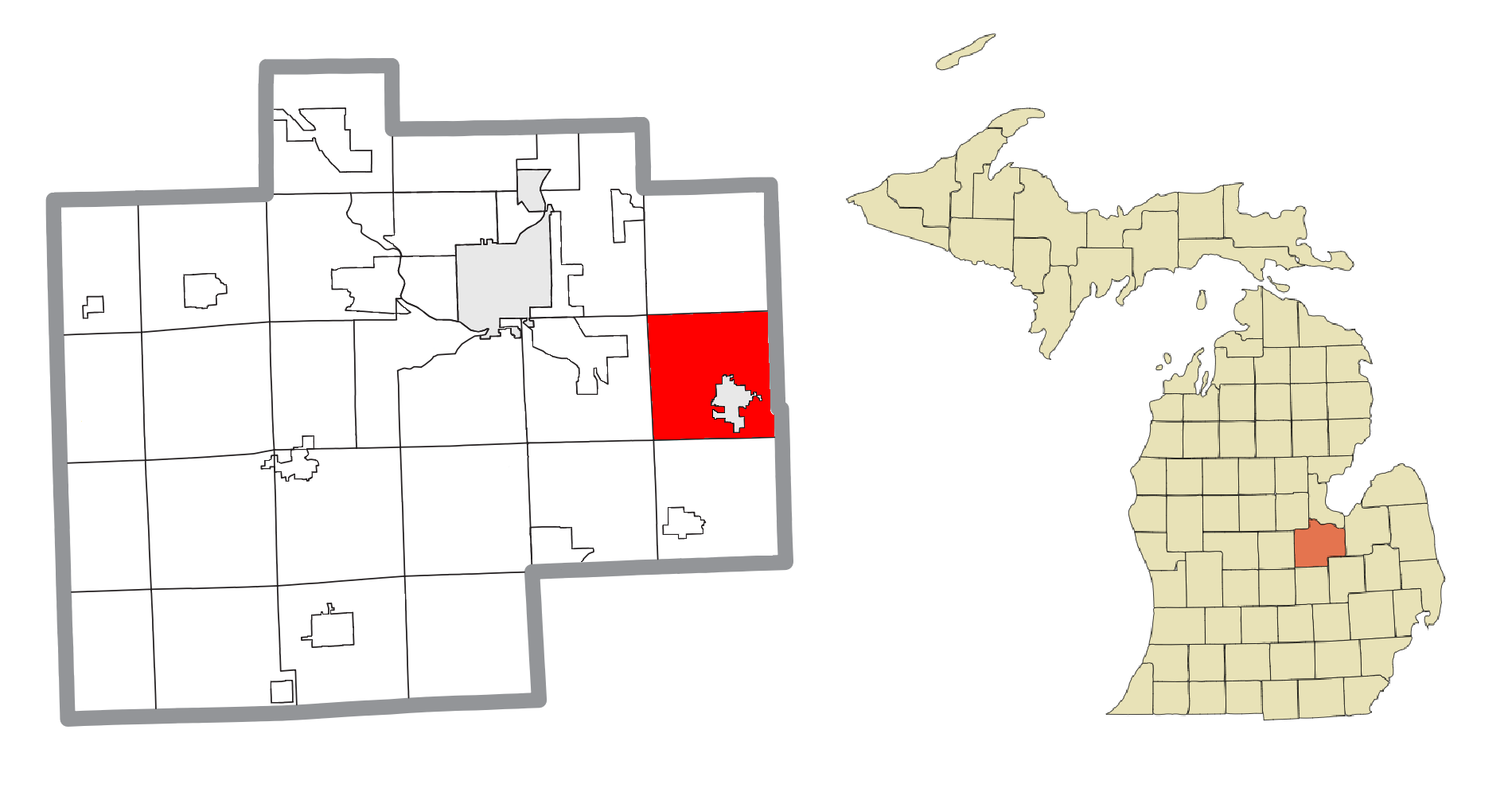
- Location within Saginaw County

- Location within the state of Michigan Frankenmuth Township (the United States)
- Coordinates: 43°20′44″N 83°45′14″W
- Country: United States
- State: Michigan
- County: Saginaw

Government
  - Supervisor: Timothy Braun
  - Clerk: Shirley Wazny

Area
  - Total: 32.7 sq mi (84.6 km^{2})
  - Land: 32.5 sq mi (84.2 km^{2})
  - Water: 0.15 sq mi (0.4 km^{2})
- Elevation: 653 ft (199 m)

Population (2020)
  - Total: 1,895
  - Density: 58.3/sq mi (22.5/km^{2})
- Time zone: UTC-5 (Eastern (EST))
  - Summer (DST): UTC-4 (EDT)
- ZIP code(s): 48734, 48787 (Frankenmuth)
- Area code: 989
- FIPS code: 26-30220
- GNIS feature ID: 1626304
- Website: Official website

Frankenmuth Township is a civil township of Saginaw County in the U.S. state of Michigan. The population was 1,895 at the 2020 Census. The city of Frankenmuth is located within the survey township area, but the township and city are administrated autonomously.

== Communities ==
- Gera is an unincorporated community in the township on S. Gera Road (M-83) at the crossing with Huron and Eastern Railway south of Bradley Road and north of King Road. A post office operated from April 23, 1894, until April 30, 1954. It was originally named Frankenmuth Station.

== Geography ==
According to the United States Census Bureau, the township has a total area of 32.7 square miles (85 km^{2}), of which 32.5 square miles (84 km^{2}) is land and 0.2 square miles (0.52 km^{2}) (0.49%) is water.

== Demographics ==
Historical population
Census	Pop.	Note	%±
2000	2,049		—
2010	1,959		−4.4%
2020	1,895		−3.3%

As of the census of 2000, there were 2,049 people, 728 households, and 607 families residing in the township. The population density was 63.1 inhabitants per square mile (24.4/km^{2}). There were 746 housing units at an average density of 23.0 per square mile (8.9/km^{2}). The racial makeup of the township was 97.76% White, 0.54% African American, 0.10% Native American, 0.20% Asian, 0.29% from other races, and 1.12% from two or more races. Hispanic or Latino of any race were 2.15% of the population.

There were 728 households, out of which 35.6% had children under the age of 18 living with them, 77.3% were married couples living together, 3.7% had a female householder with no husband present, and 16.5% were non-families. 15.0% of all households were made up of individuals, and 8.2% had someone living alone who was 65 years of age or older. The average household size was 2.79 and the average family size was 3.09.

In the township the population was spread out, with 27.0% under the age of 18, 6.1% from 18 to 24, 23.7% from 25 to 44, 29.3% from 45 to 64, and 13.8% who were 65 years of age or older. The median age was 41 years. For every 100 females, there were 102.3 males. For every 100 females age 18 and over, there were 101.8 males.

The median income for a household in the township was $61,480, and the median income for a family was $66,042. Males had a median income of $43,929 versus $31,027 for females. The per capita income for the township was $25,833. About 2.2% of families and 3.5% of the population were below the poverty line, including 1.8% of those under age 18 and 7.0% of those age 65 or over.
