= Bavarian Inn Lodge =

Resort and water park in Frankenmuth, Michigan, United States

- Interactive map of Bavarian Inn Lodge
- Location: One Covered Bridge Lane, Frankenmuth, Michigan
- Coordinates: 43.325876°N 83.736763°W
- Theme: Bavaria
- Owner: Michael Keller Zehnder
- General manager: Joanna Nelson
- Opened: 1986
- Operating season: Year-round
- Website: www.bavarianinn.com

Bavarian Inn Lodge is a 360-room resort and indoor water park in Frankenmuth, Michigan. It is one of the attractions in Frankenmuth, a major regional tourist destination, and features the largest indoor water park in Michigan. With about one thousand employees, it is the eighth largest employer in Saginaw County. The lodge hosts about 200,000 overnight guests each year.

== History ==
The name Bavarian Inn originally referred only to a nearby restaurant that is owned by the same family, the Zehnders. Originally called the Bavarian Inn Motor Lodge, the lodge was a spinoff from the nearby Bavarian Inn Restaurant.

Since 1929, the Zehnder family has owned and operated Zehnder's, a colonial-style restaurant in Frankenmuth. In 1958, William “Tiny” Zehnder Jr., son of the founder of Zehnder's Restaurant and a prominent figure in Frankenmuth's business community, purchased the former Fischer Hotel. During renovations to transform the building into the Bavarian Inn Restaurant, his architect proposed incorporating traditional Bavarian architectural styles, an idea that Zehnder embraced. Zehnder subsequently helped encourage other local businesses to adopt Bavarian-themed architecture and branding, contributing to the development of Frankenmuth's tourism industry.

The lodge opened across the Cass River in May 1986 with 100 rooms. The lodge continued the Bavarian architectural theme. In October 1988, construction began on a 98-room addition that included a 55-foot tower topped by an onion dome. The addition opened in June 1989. By 1990, “motor” had been dropped from the resort's name.

On June 1, 1995, the third expansion opened, adding 156 rooms and additional swimming pools and activities. Three years later, an addition brought the total capacity of the conference center to 800. In 2000, two pools were added, bringing the total number to five. Water slides were added in 2012. By that point, the hotel had 360 rooms.

The Bavarian Blast indoor water park, an addition to the lodge building, opened in March 2025.

== Description ==
The building is inspired by the traditional architecture of Bavaria. It incorporates towers, decorative timber framing, colorful pastel-shaded stucco walls, and carved wood details.

The hotel's 360 rooms are each named for a German family that settled in the Frankenmuth area. The downstairs family entertainment center offers additional restaurants, a miniature golf course, laser tag, arcade, and an indoor ropes course. Prior to the opening of the water park, the resort featured five pools and two waterslides.

The Bavarian Blast water park added a wave pool, toddler pool, lazy river (called a “not-so-lazy” river by the park), 16 waterslides, 20 private cabanas, an activity pool with basketball hoops, a restaurant and Michigan's first swim-up bar. A tall glass roof and walls allow for tanning. At 170,000 square feet, it is Michigan's largest indoor water park as of 2025.

Design of the water park was a collaboration between Aquatic Design Group (engineering) and Adirondack Studios. Adirondack Studios provided art direction and fabrication services for themed features throughout the water park, such as playful animal sculptures and colorful decorative structures and buildings.
