= Zehnder's =

Restaurant in Frankenmuth, Michigan, United States

Coordinates: 43°19′37″N 83°44′27″W

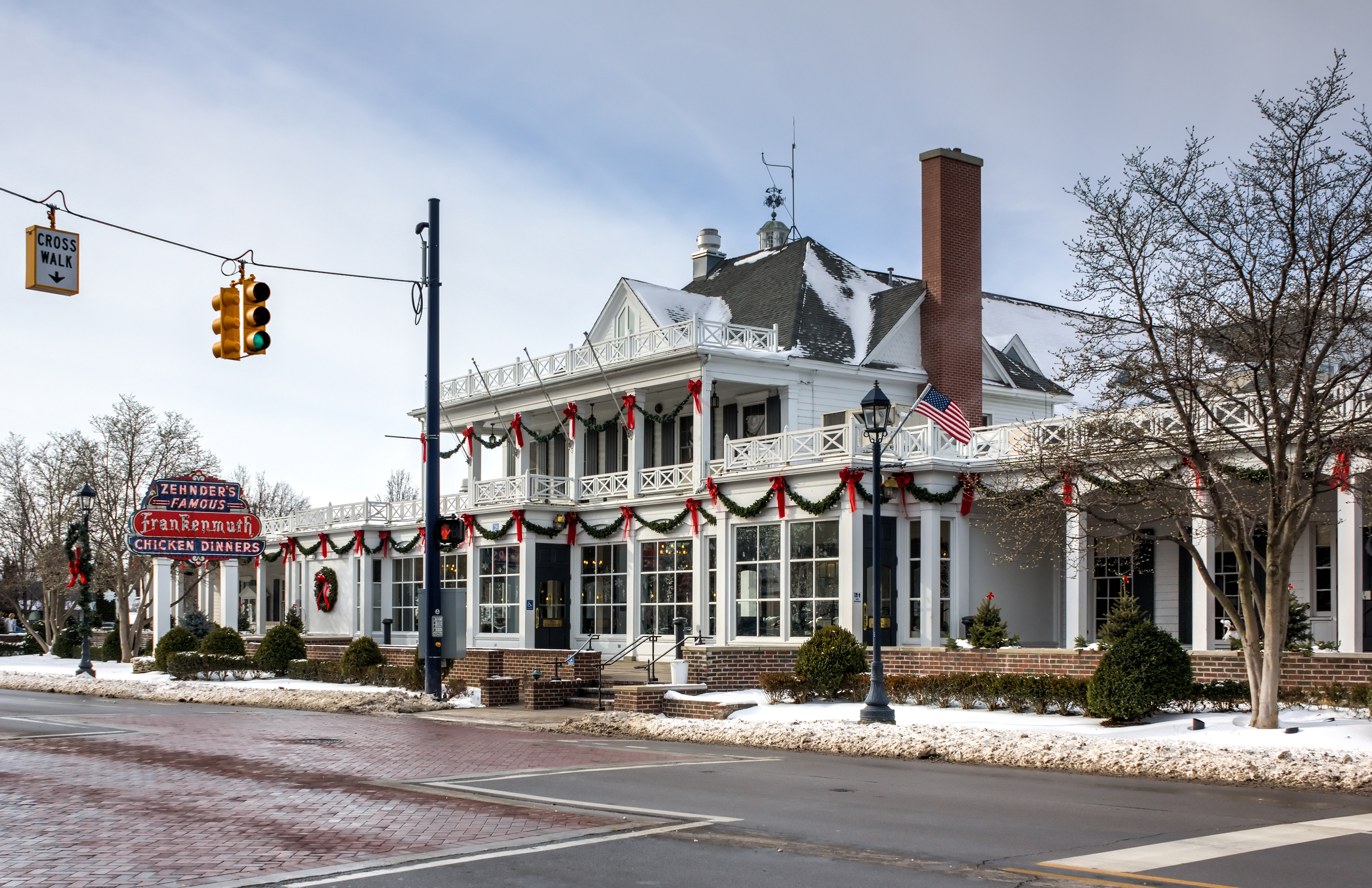
- Interactive map of Zehnder's

Restaurant information
- Established: 1856
- Food type: Chicken, seafood, steak, desserts
- Location: 730 South Main Street, Frankenmuth, Saginaw, Michigan, 48734, United States
- Seating capacity: 1,500

Zehnder's is a restaurant in Frankenmuth, Michigan, United States. It was founded in 1929. In 2020 it was named an America's Classic by the James Beard Foundation.

== Description ==
Zehnder's is located in Frankenmuth's business district.

The restaurant has seating for 1,500 and as of 2026 serves almost a million diners every year. In the 1980s, it was one of the ten largest restaurants in the United States. As of 2026 it was the largest family restaurant in the US.

The restaurant serves traditional American and German cuisine and specializes in fried chicken dinners served family style.

== History ==
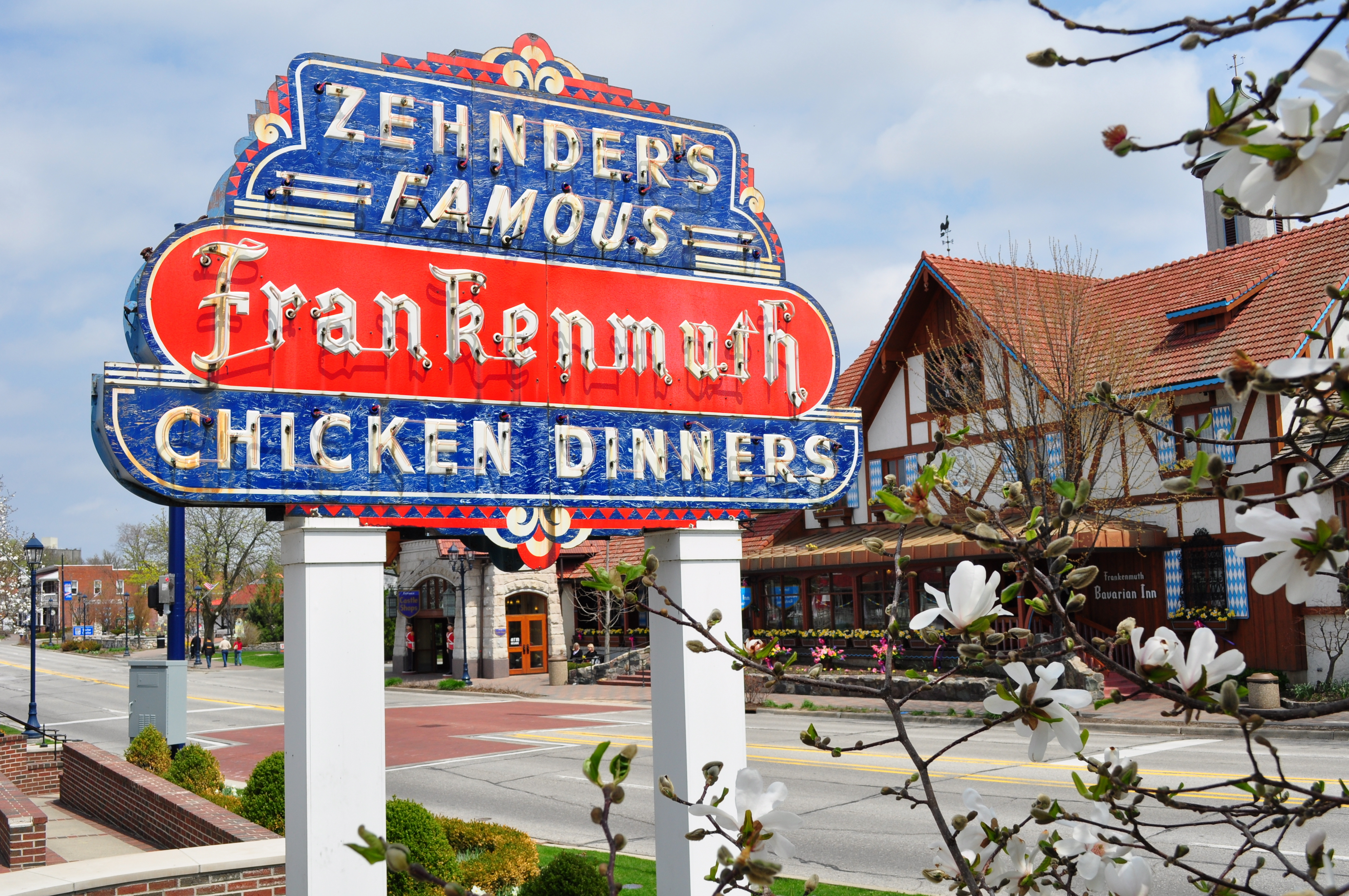
Zehnder's in Spring 2011

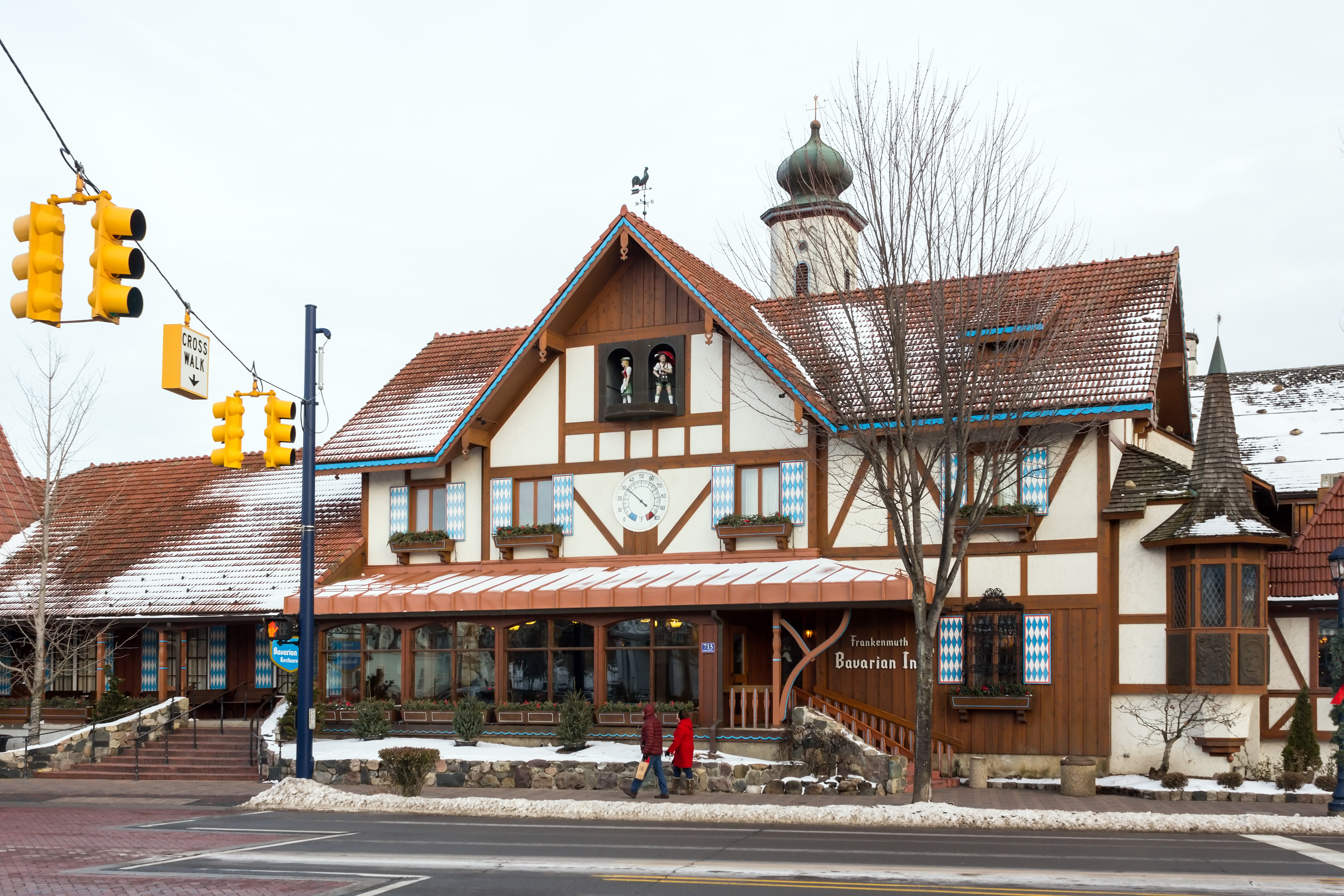
The Bavarian Inn Restaurant, also owned by the Zehnder family

Zehnder's was originally built as the Exchange Hotel by Henry Reichle in 1856. Reichle ran the hotel for twenty years, after which it was sold and operated by several different people.

In 1927, William Zehnder Sr. purchased the hotel and remodeled the building, including redesigning its facade to resemble Mount Vernon, and reopened it as Zehnder's on Mother's Day in 1929. After World War II, the business grew rapidly.

In March 1947, the business was turned over to Zehnder's children. The business became a corporation, and in the 1950s the Zehnders bought Fischer's Hotel located across the street, renaming it the Bavarian Inn in 1959. In 1955, William Zehnder Jr. (manager of the Bavarian Inn) and Edwin Zehnder (manager of Zehnder's Restaurant) purchased the interests of Zehnder's, Inc. from their brothers and sister. They re-decorated the restaurant in a Bavarian theme after visiting Bavaria on vacation, and the annual Frankenmuth Bavarian Festival began during their week-long grand re-opening celebration.

== Recognition ==
In 2011 John Zehnder, the executive chef and food and beverage manager, received the Hermann G. Rusch Chef's Achievement Award from the American Culinary Federation.

In 2020 the restaurant was named an America's Classic by the James Beard Foundation.
