= Eduard Raimund Baierlein =

Eduard Raimund Baierlein (29 April 1819, in Posen – 12 October 1901) was a German Lutheran missionary.

In June 1847 he arrived in Frankenmuth, Michigan as a missionary to the Ojibwe people. The following spring he established a Lutheran mission in the vicinity of present-day St. Louis, Michigan. He learned the Ojibwe language, and in the process translated several texts, including a 47-page catechism.

In 1853 he left Michigan, relocating to India in the service of the Leipzig Evangelical Lutheran Mission. During his many years in India, he was stationed in Sadras, Cuddalore, and Tranquebar. Due to failing health, he retired from missionary work in 1886.

== Written works ==
- Nach und aus Indien : Reise und Culturbilder, 1873
- Die ev.-luth. Mission in Ostindien : Missionstuden, 1874
- Im Urwalde bei den roten Indianern : mit zwei Bildern, 1888–89
- Unter den Palmen Im Lande der Sonne. Mit fünf Bildern, 1890
- Bei den roten Indianern : Aufzeichnungen eines Missionars, 1905

Works by Baierlein that have been translated into English:

- "The land of the Tamulians and its missions", 1875
- "In the wilderness with the Red Indians : German missionary to the Michigan Indians, 1847-1853".
