= Frankenmuth, Michigan =

- City
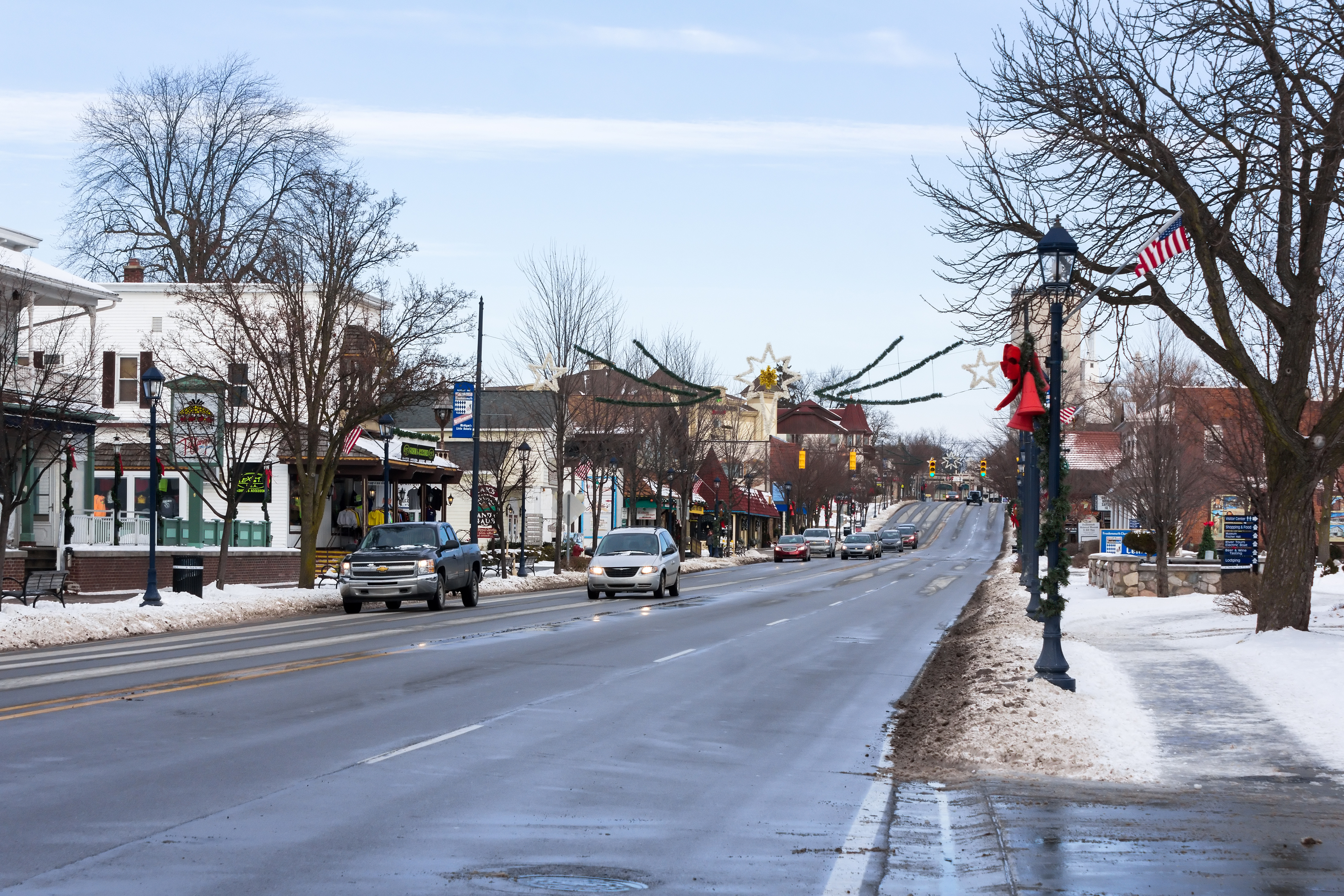
- Downtown Frankenmuth along Main Street

- Seal
- Nicknames: Little Bavaria, Muth, The Muth
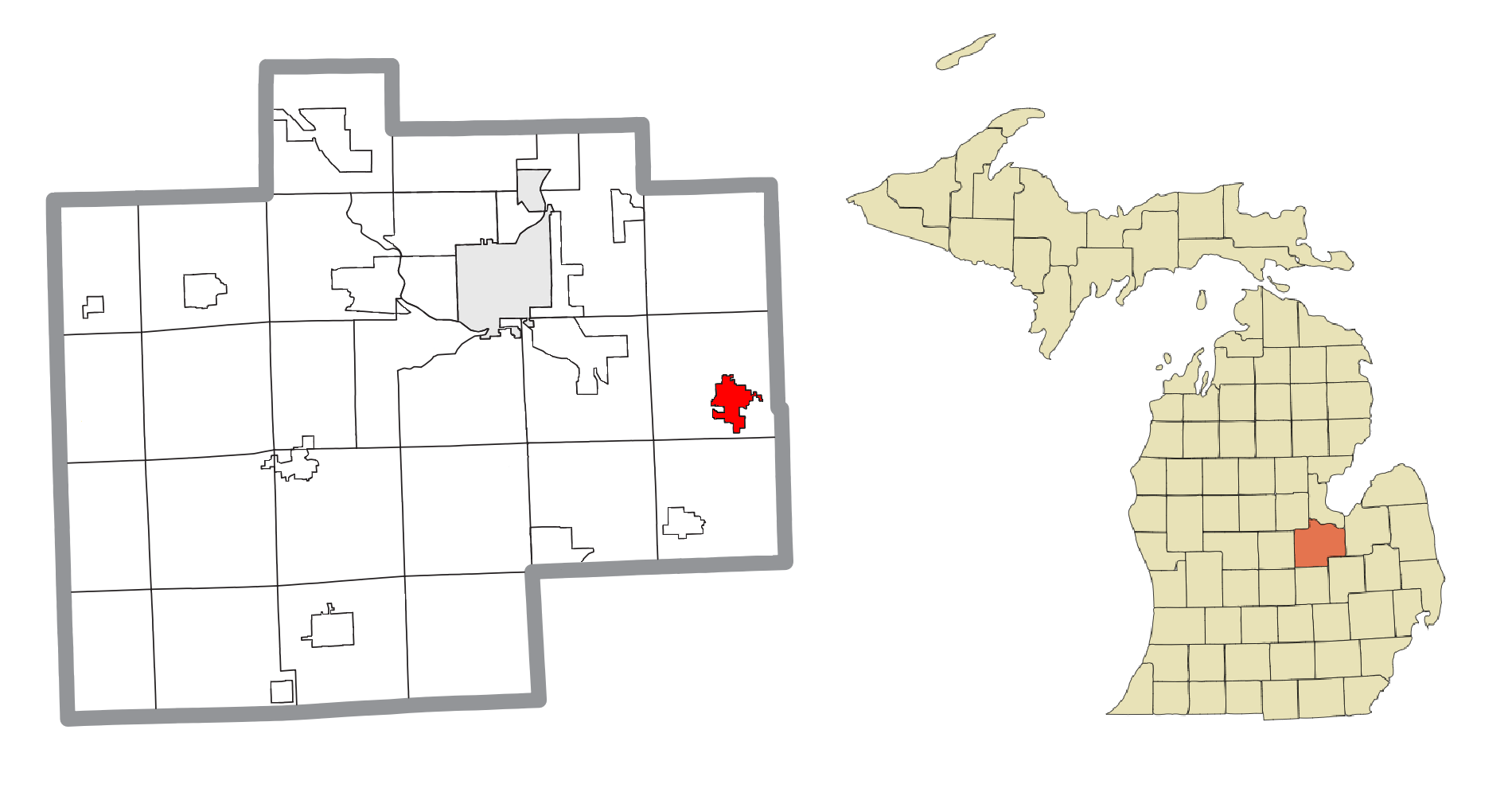
- Location within Saginaw County

- Location within the state of Michigan
- Coordinates: 43°19′56″N 83°44′21″W
- Country: United States
- State: Michigan
- County: Saginaw
- Settled: 1845
- Incorporated: 1904 (village); 1959 (city)

Government
  - Type: Council–manager
  - Mayor: Tom Meyer
  - City manager: Bridget Smith

Area
  - Total: 3.17 sq mi (8.20 km^{2})
  - Land: 3.11 sq mi (8.05 km^{2})
  - Water: 0.058 sq mi (0.15 km^{2})
- Elevation: 637 ft (194 m)

Population (2020)
  - Total: 4,987
  - Density: 1,604/sq mi (619.3/km^{2})
- Time zone: UTC-5 (EST)
  - Summer (DST): UTC-4 (EDT)
- ZIP code: 48734
- Area code: 989
- FIPS code: 26-30200
- GNIS feature ID: 1626303
- Website: www.frankenmuth.org

Frankenmuth (/ˈfræŋ.kən.muːθ/ FRANK-ən-mooth) is a city in Saginaw County in the U.S. state of Michigan. The population was 4,987 at the 2020 census. The city is surrounded by Frankenmuth Township.

The city's name is a combination of two German words: Franken for the region of Franconia in Bavaria from which the original settlers came, and Mut (formerly spelled Muth (Note: the sound represented by "th" does not exist in modern standard German. Native German words which still had the digraph dropped it after the German Orthographic Conference of 1901)) which means "courage". Thus, the name Frankenmuth means "courage of the Franconians". The most popular nickname is "Little Bavaria", in reference to the city's German heritage.

== History ==
The area was settled and named by conservative Lutheran immigrants from Roßtal area of Franconia in Germany. The group of settlers left Germany aboard the Caroline on April 20, 1845, and arrived at Castle Garden in New York seven weeks later. They traveled via canals and the Great Lakes from New York to Detroit and arrived in August 1845. Sailing then on the Nelson Smith, the settlers made their way to Saginaw and traveled over land to what is now the city of Frankenmuth.

The purpose of the settlement was primarily religious. The Lutheran group planned to start a mission among the Native Americans. One of the first large buildings was a church. However, their attempts to convert the local groups failed because most of the Native Americans were forced away within a few years.

The settlers selected a hilly area that reminded them of their native Mittelfranken and began building rough shelters there. Frankenmuth was to be an exclusively German Lutheran community. The colonists pledged to remain loyal to Germany, specifically the Kingdom of Bavaria (German: Königreich Bayern), and to be faithful to the German language. Germans continued arriving until the start of the Second World War.

The community was originally part of Bridgeport Township and later Frankenmuth Township, Frankenmuth became a village in 1904. In 1938, the village hired its first village manager, Herbert L. Keinath. The village was incorporated as a city on October 1, 1959, with Keinath becoming city manager.

The nearby villages of Frankenlust, Frankentrost, and Frankenhilf (now known as Richville) further illustrate that the area remained a magnet for other Germans emigrating from the same region. The German, and in particular, Franconian culture of the town, has been preserved and passed down through the generations. The German language is still prevalent in signage and speech, and German speakers continue to reside in the town. In addition, the church of St. Lorenz offers monthly services in the German language.

== Geography ==
According to the United States Census Bureau, the city has a total area of 3.04 square miles (7.87 km^{2}), of which 2.99 square miles (7.74 km^{2}) is land and 0.05 square miles (0.13 km^{2}) is water. The Cass River passes through the town.

== Demographics ==
Historical population
Census	Pop.	Note	%±
1910	693		—
1920	733		5.8%
1930	925		26.2%
1940	1,100		18.9%
1950	1,208		9.8%
1960	1,728		43.0%
1970	2,834		64.0%
1980	3,753		32.4%
1990	4,408		17.5%
2000	4,838		9.8%
2010	4,944		2.2%
2020	4,987		0.9%
U.S. Decennial Census

=== 2020 census ===
As of the 2020 census, Frankenmuth had a population of 4,987. The median age was 53.5 years. 16.5% of residents were under the age of 18 and 33.1% of residents were 65 years of age or older. For every 100 females there were 83.8 males, and for every 100 females age 18 and over there were 80.0 males age 18 and over.

99.4% of residents lived in urban areas, while 0.6% lived in rural areas.

There were 2,234 households in Frankenmuth, of which 20.5% had children under the age of 18 living in them. Of all households, 49.1% were married-couple households, 14.6% were households with a male householder and no spouse or partner present, and 32.9% were households with a female householder and no spouse or partner present. About 37.7% of all households were made up of individuals and 23.4% had someone living alone who was 65 years of age or older.

There were 2,474 housing units, of which 9.7% were vacant. The homeowner vacancy rate was 1.7% and the rental vacancy rate was 16.0%.

Racial composition as of the 2020 census
Race	Number	Percent
White	4,642	93.1%
Black or African American	50	1.0%
American Indian and Alaska Native	17	0.3%
Asian	62	1.2%
Native Hawaiian and Other Pacific Islander	0	0.0%
Some other race	45	0.9%
Two or more races	171	3.4%
Hispanic or Latino (of any race)	152	3.0%

=== 2010 census ===
Largest ancestries (2010)	Percentage
German	49.3%
English	12.9%
Polish	8.6%
Irish	6.3%
American	4.4%
French	4.0%

As of the census of 2010, there were 4,944 people, 2,200 households, and 1,313 families residing in the city. The population density was 1,653.5 inhabitants per square mile (638.4/km^{2}). There were 2,396 housing units at an average density of 801.3 per square mile (309.4/km^{2}). The racial makeup of the city was 97.4% White, 0.5% African American, 0.2% Native American, 0.8% Asian, 0.4% from other races, and 0.6% from two or more races. Hispanic or Latino of any race were 1.9% of the population.

There were 2,200 households, of which 23.8% had children under the age of 18 living with them, 50.5% were married couples living together, 7.1% had a female householder with no husband present, 2.0% had a male householder with no wife present, and 40.3% were non-families. 37.2% of all households were made up of individuals, and 22.7% had someone living alone who was 65 years of age or older. The average household size was 2.14 and the average family size was 2.82.

The median age in the city was 50.1 years. 19.3% of residents were under the age of 18; 5.9% were between the ages of 18 and 24; 17.9% were from 25 to 44; 28% were from 45 to 64; and 28.9% were 65 years of age or older. The gender makeup of the city was 44.9% male and 55.1% female.

=== 2000 census ===
Languages (2000)	Percentage
Spoke English at home	84.78%
Spoke German at home	8.74%
Spoke Spanish at home	0.77%

Largest ancestries (2000)	Percentage
German	52.9%
English	13.2%
Irish	9.5%
Polish	7.9%
French	6.0%
American	5.8%

As of the census of 2000, there were 4,838 people, 2,123 households, and 1,322 families residing in the city. The population density was 1,773.6 inhabitants per square mile (684.8/km^{2}). There were 2,240 housing units at an average density of 821.2 per square mile (317.1/km^{2}). The racial makeup of the city was 98.80% White, 0.27% African American, 0.21% Native American, 0.29% Asian, 0.06% from other races, and 0.37% from two or more races. Hispanic or Latino of any race were 0.95% of the population.

Citizens with German ancestry formed nearly 53% of the city population.

24.8% households had children under the age of 18 living with them, 54.8% were married couples living together, 5.8% had a female householder with no husband present, and 37.7% were non-families. 35.7% of all households were made up of individuals, and 20.3% had someone living alone who was 65 years of age or older. The average household size was 2.16 and the average family size was 2.82.

In the city, 20.4% of the population was under the age of 18, 4.7% from 18 to 24, 21.3% from 25 to 44, 25.3% from 45 to 64, and 28.3% was 65 years of age or older. The median age was 48 years. For every 100 females, there were 80.5 males. For every 100 females age 18 and over, there were 75.9 males.

The median income for a household in the city was $51,153, and the median income for a family was $71,667. Males had a median income of $51,004 versus $29,959 for females. The per capita income for the city was $30,479. About 2.4% of families and 4.9% of the population were below the poverty line, including 5.2% of those under age 18 and 7.7% of those age 65 or over.

== Economy ==
Tourism and farming drive the local economy. Local festivals and other events are held to attract visitors throughout the year.

In addition to tourism, a significant number of residents in and around the community work in agriculture.

In late 2022, it was announced that the Bavarian Inn Lodge would break ground on an $80 million, 140,000-square-foot (13,000 m^{2}) expansion of the resort, with the water park becoming the largest indoor park in Michigan and the 4th largest in the world.

== Architecture ==
The strong influence of Franconian-style architecture can be found in most areas of the city. Most buildings in the commercial district, as well as many homes, feature stylistic interpretations of the timber-framed buildings found in the Franconia region of Germany, which include timbers placed in "square" and "X" patterns on the outside of buildings, as well as the use of "X" patterns on windows, doors, and other building features.

== Government ==
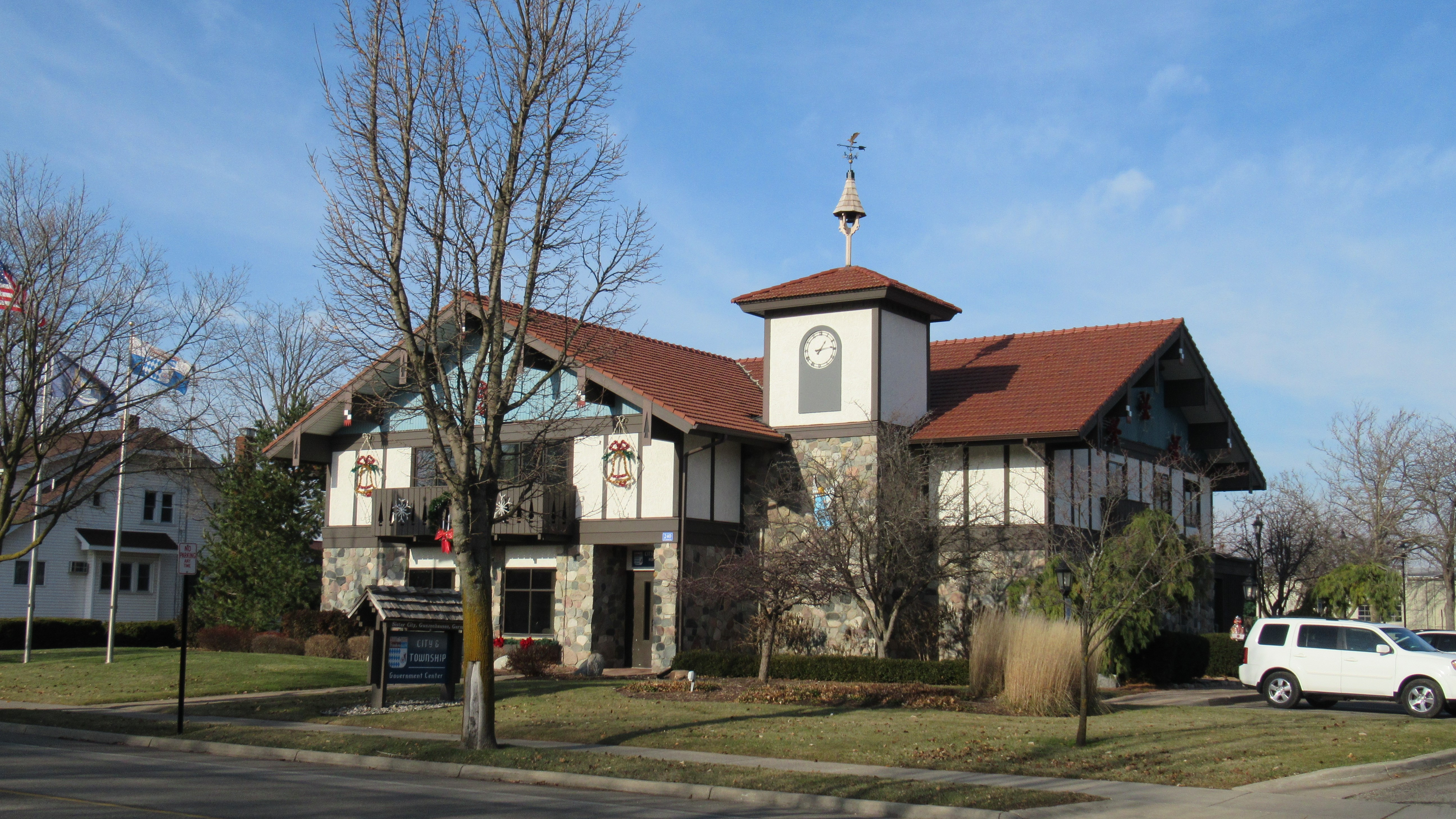
Frankenmuth City & Township Government Center

The city has a council–manager form of government. The city is served by the Frankenmuth School District.

== Festivals ==
- Oktoberfest: In 1990, Frankenmuth, also known as "Michigan's Little Bavaria," celebrated its first Oktoberfest. The Frankenmuth Oktoberfest celebrates German culture, heritage and love. Frankenmuth has a unique German heritage and culture. The Frankenmuth Oktoberfest strives to preserve and share the sights and sounds as well as the food and drink of the Munich Oktoberfest. The goal of the festival is to also retain and celebrate the local Bavarian heritage of the region.

By official proclamation of Lord Mayor Christian Ude on behalf of the German Parliament and city of Munich, Frankenmuth's Oktoberfest was declared in 1996 the first Oktoberfest to operate outside that city with the blessing of the original Oktoberfest. The event was also moved at that time into September to coincide with the opening of the Munich event. Also, for the first time in its history, the world-famous Hofbräuhaus brewery of Munich exported its beer to the United States. Local businessman Fred Schumacher, who later became president of Hofbräuhaus of America, handled the arrangements for getting the beer to Frankenmuth in time for the Oktoberfest. Frankenmuth's Oktoberfest is considered one of the most important and popular autumn festivals in the United States.

- Frankenmuth Bavarian Festival: This is Michigan's largest Bavarian heritage festival. Beginning in 1959, it is an annual summer celebration of Bavarian culture and values through food, drink, traditional activities and music.
- Frankenmuth SnowFest: Frankenmuth is also host to one of the top snow-sculpting events in North America, Zehnder's SnowFest, which includes the United States Collegiate National Ice Carving Championships.
- Frankenmuth Fire Muster: For several years, on the last Saturday in July, the Great Lakes International Antique Fire Apparatus Association (GLIAFAA) holds their annual fire muster, complete with parade, at Heritage Park, displaying restored antique vintage fire trucks, along with several ambulances and police cars, for the public to view and learn a little about the vehicles, their time in active service, and how they came into the ownership of their preservationists, including several of the apparatus showing off their firefighting capabilities along the riverfront.
- Frankenmuth Autofest: Held annually on the weekend following Labor Day, Frankenmuth Autofest is a three-day car show that draws over 2,500 classic cars, including muscle cars and street rods. The first day features a block party on Main Street, with the vehicles on display in Heritage Park the following two days. On the display days, a live DJ plays oldies music in the park, primarily focusing on rock and roll music of the 1950s and 1960s.
- Michigan's Big Country Fest: An event showcasing country music held the third week of October.
- Frankenmuth Dog Bowl and Balloons Over Bavarian Inn: Held on Memorial Day Weekend, this festival is billed as "the world's largest Olympic-style fest for dogs" and features dock and disc dog competitions, sheep herding demonstrations, agility competition, a pet costume contest and parade, a wiener dog race, and other events. In conjunction with Dog Bowl is Balloons Over Bavarian Inn, a competitive event for hot air balloons featuring balloon glow events each night and balloon flights each morning and evening of the festival.

== Places of interest ==
=== Covered bridge ===
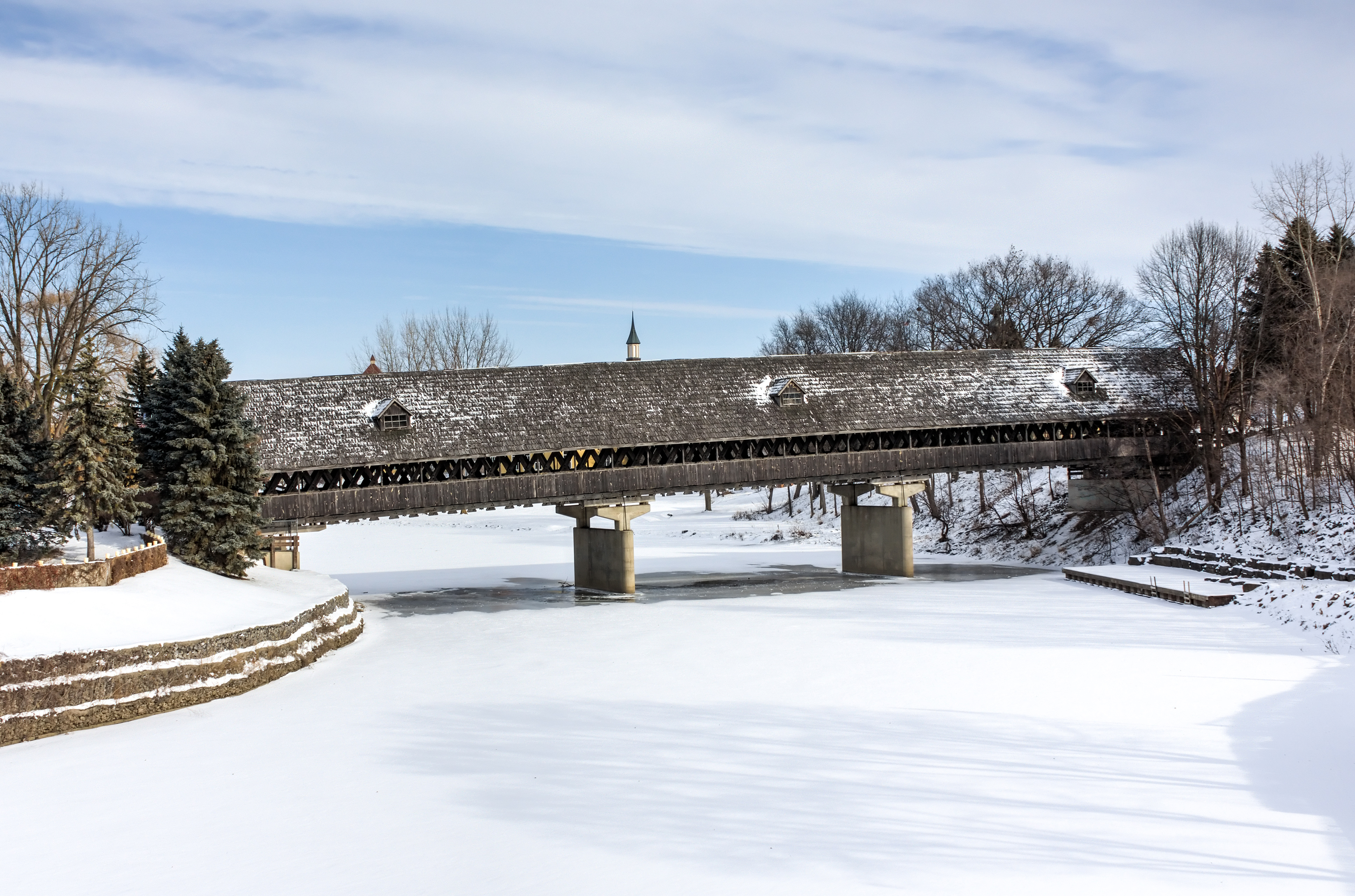
Zehnder's Holzbrücke

Zehnder's Holzbrücke (German for wooden bridge) is a wooden covered bridge, built in a style similar to those of the Black Forest or a river in Switzerland, over the Cass River in the middle of town. Though completed in 1979, the two-lane structure was constructed using traditional covered-bridge timber framing techniques. The floor joists and three-span Town lattice truss system of the 239 ft (73 m) bridge are made of 100,000 board feet (240 m^{3}) of Douglas Fir, and the decking of 15,960 board feet (37.7 m^{3}) of 4-inch (100 mm) planks. The area receiving the greatest wear is of oak, while the remainder is spruce. Approximately 20,000 board feet (47 m^{3}) of Douglas Fir make up the rafters, and the roof is shingled with cedar. An additional 4,340 board feet (10.2 m^{3}) of pine was required for the bridge side boards. The 230-ton structure was built in place on the east bank of the river, then pulled into position over the river with a capstan and pulleys. It is wide enough to accommodate two pedestrian walkways in addition to auto traffic.

=== Heritage Park ===
Heritage Park is Frankenmuth's best-known park. Located at 601 Weiss Street, it is home to many community activities, festivals, and large events. The Harvey E. Kern Community Pavilion is the newest addition, and has become a focal point of the park. Other features include four picnic pavilions, three ball diamonds, playgrounds, sand volleyball courts, basketball court, a 0.9-mile (1.4 km) riverwalk pathway, and several facilities for festivals.

=== Silent Night Chapel replica ===
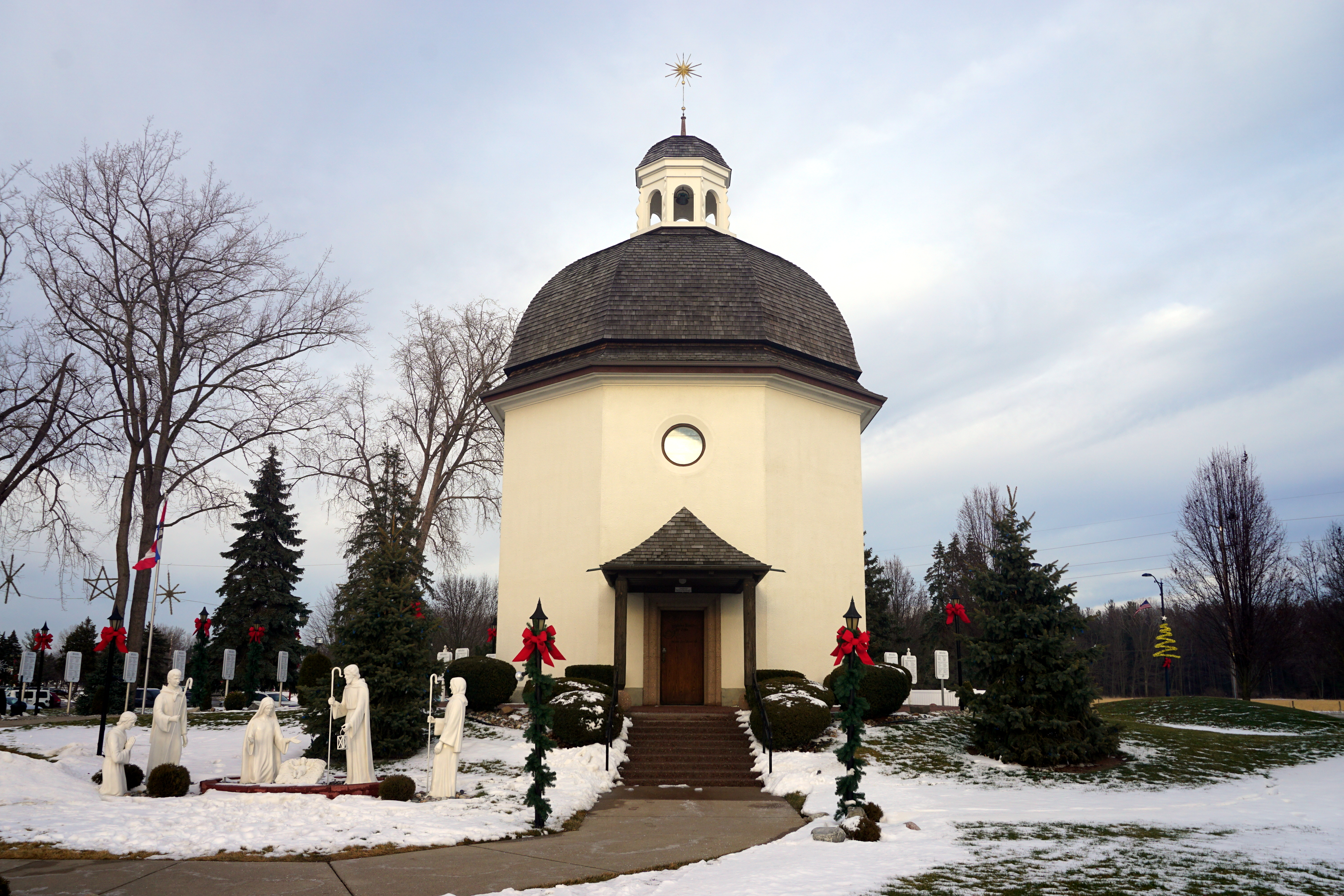
Silent Night Memorial Chapel

A scale replica of the Silent Night Chapel is located on the southern end of the property of Bronner's.

=== September 11th Memorial ===
A 900-pound, 10-foot twisted piece of I-beam steel recovered from the remains of the Twin Towers of the original World Trade Center destroyed on 9/11/2001 stands outside the Frankenmuth joint police/fire department headquarters on the fire department's side of the building. Donated to the Frankenmuth Fire Department during the cleanup and recovery operations in New York City following the destruction of the Twin Towers by Al Qaeda hijacked aircraft and subsequent collapse of the two 110-story buildings, the piece of steel, mounted on a granite base shaped like The Pentagon, allows visitors to look at the historical piece of American history, and read about the events of that tragic day on the panels located on the base of the memorial.

== Print media ==
=== Frankenmuth News ===
The Frankenmuth News has been Frankenmuth's primary newspaper since 1906. It is released on a weekly basis (Wednesday for news stands and Thursday for residential) and focuses on issues of local concern.

== Sister city ==
- Gunzenhausen, Germany

== Notable residents ==
- Eduard Raimund Baierlein (1819–1901), German missionary
- Frederick William Danker (1920–2012), lexicographer
- Ludwig E. Fuerbringer (1864–1947), Lutheran academic
- Kenneth Horn (1959–), Michigan state senator
- Greta Van Fleet, rock band containing Josh Kiszka (Vocals), Jake Kiszka (Guitar), Sam Kiszka (Bass, Keyboard), and Danny Wagner (Drums)

== Gallery ==
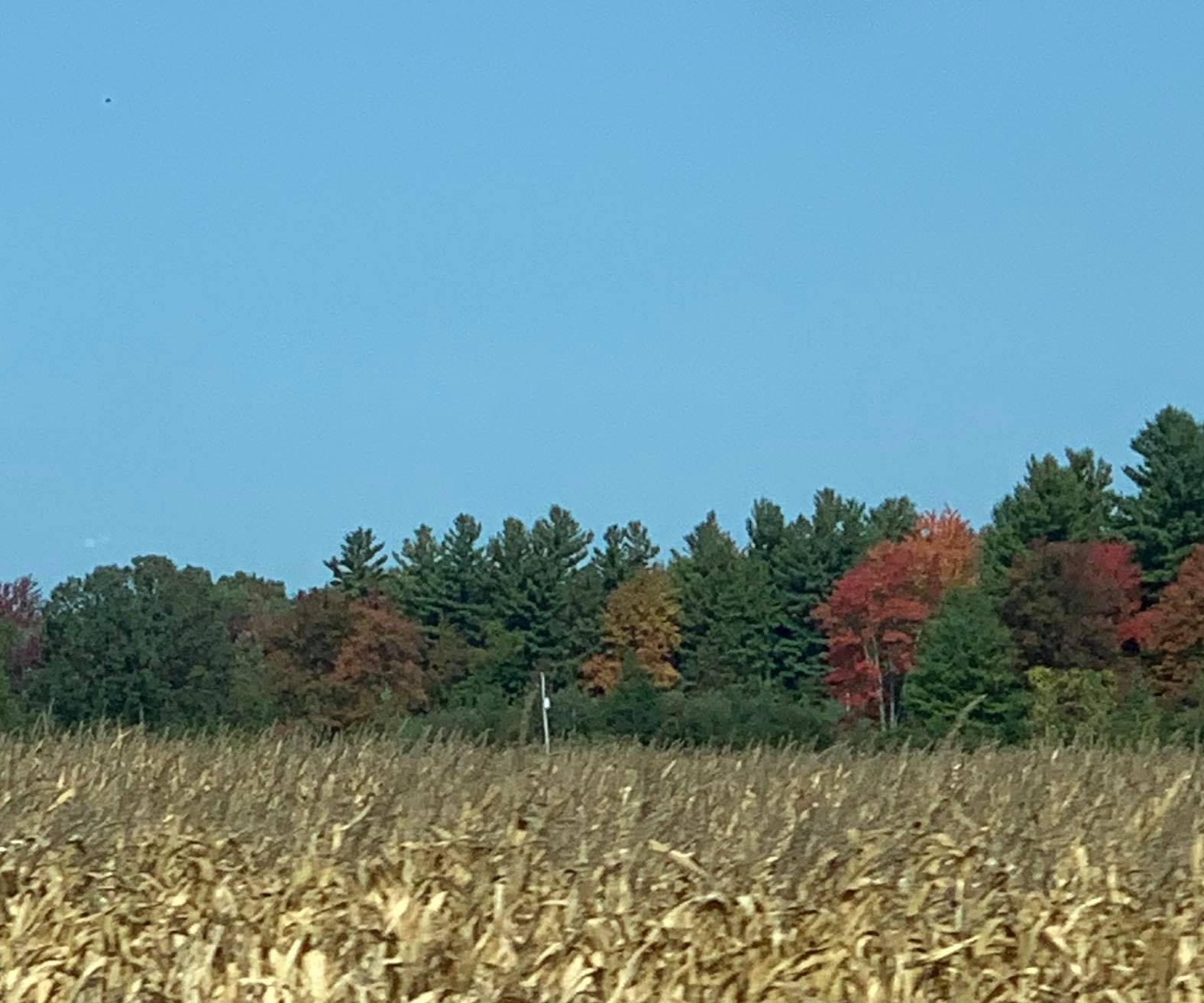
Field and trees in the autumn in Frankenmuth

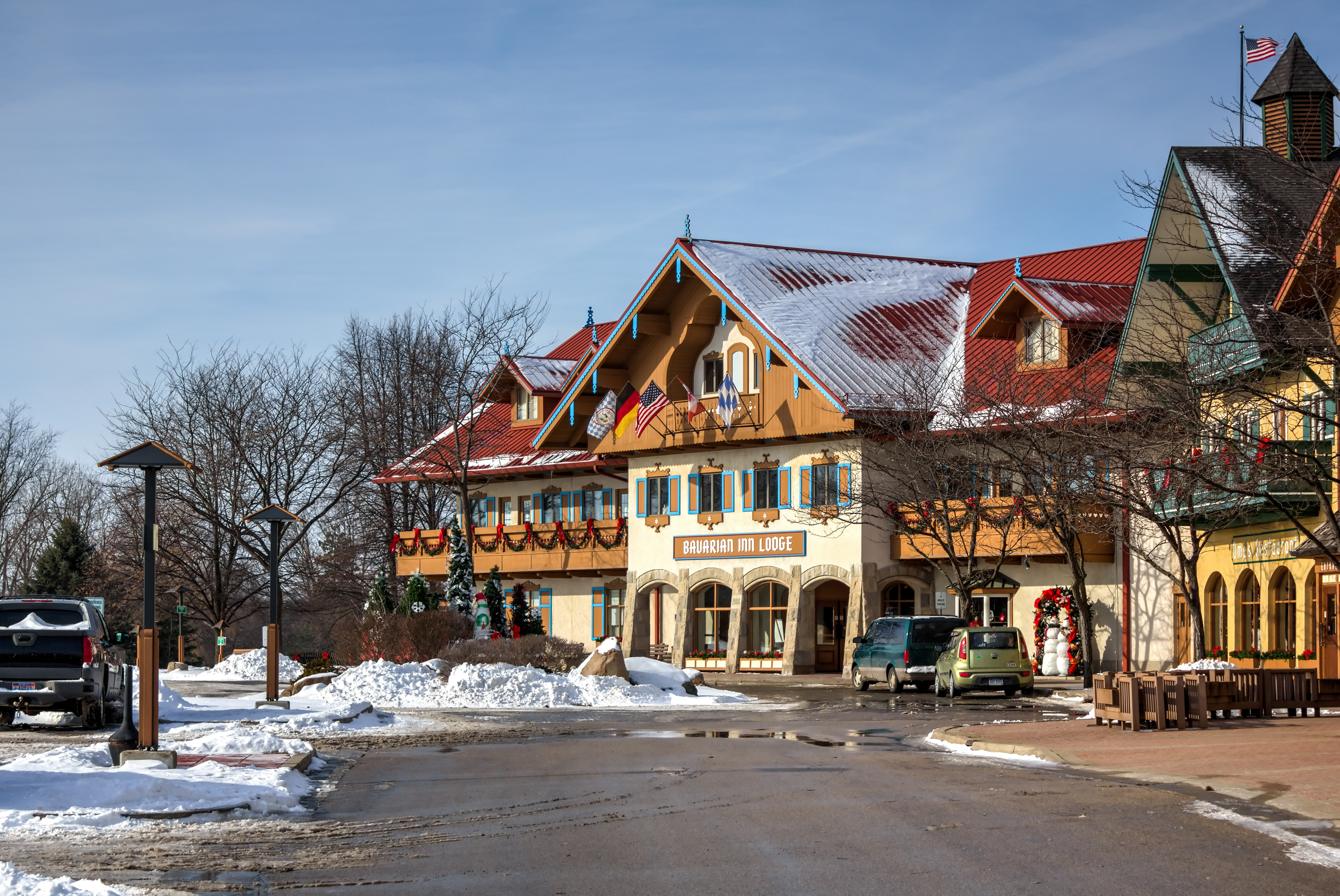
Bavarian Inn Lodge

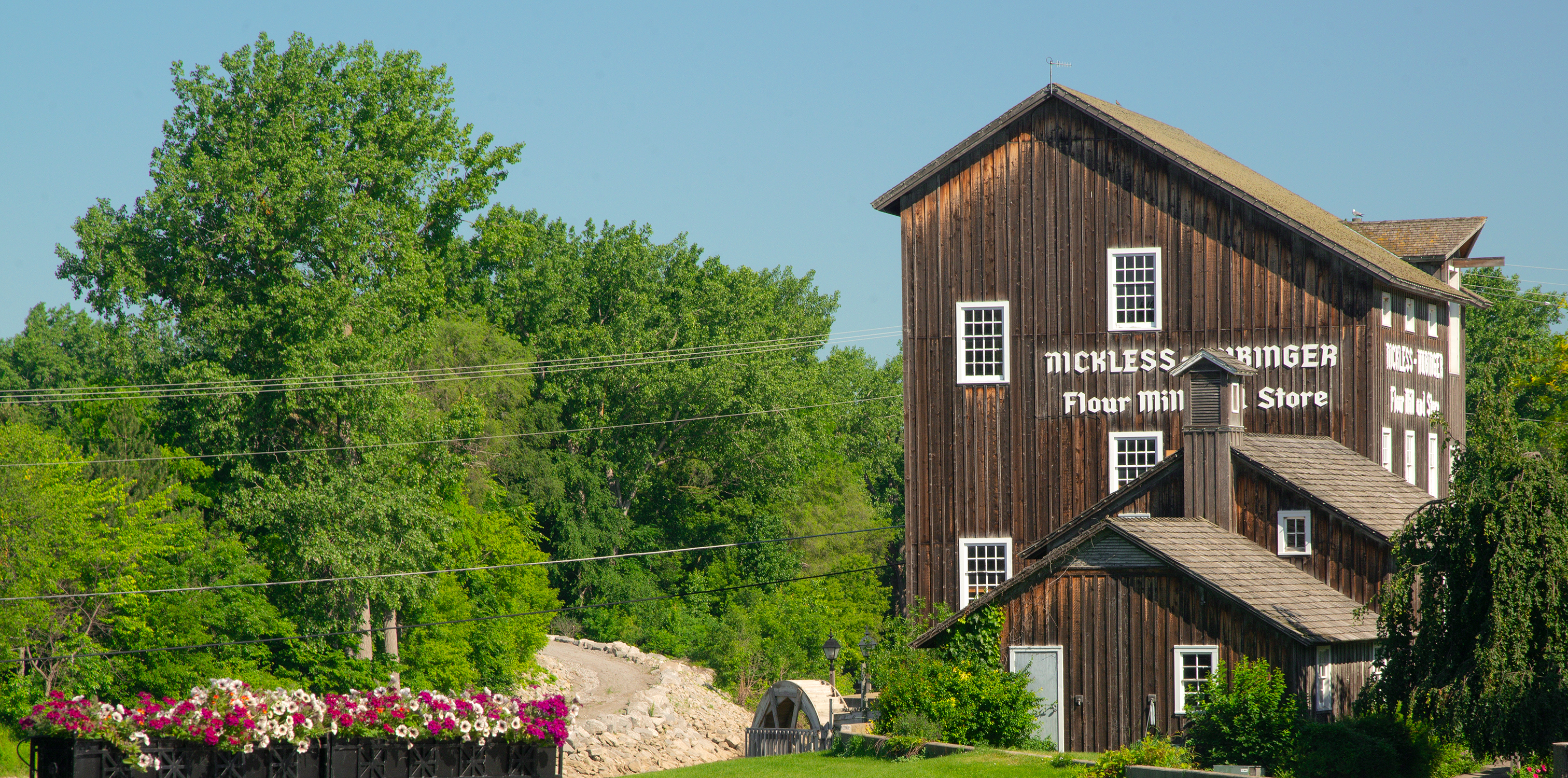
The Nickless-Hubinger Flour Mill

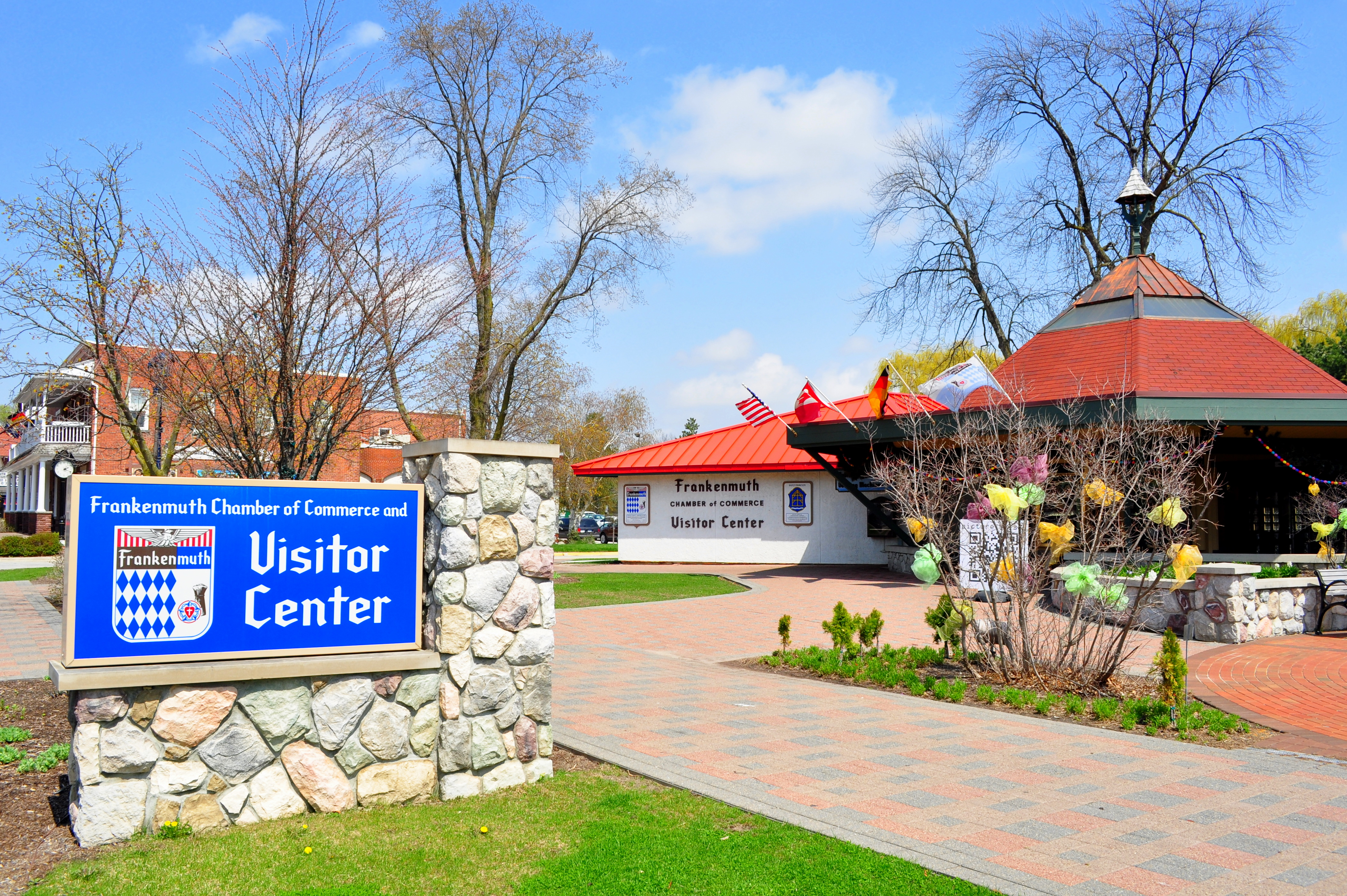
Frankenmuth Visitor Center

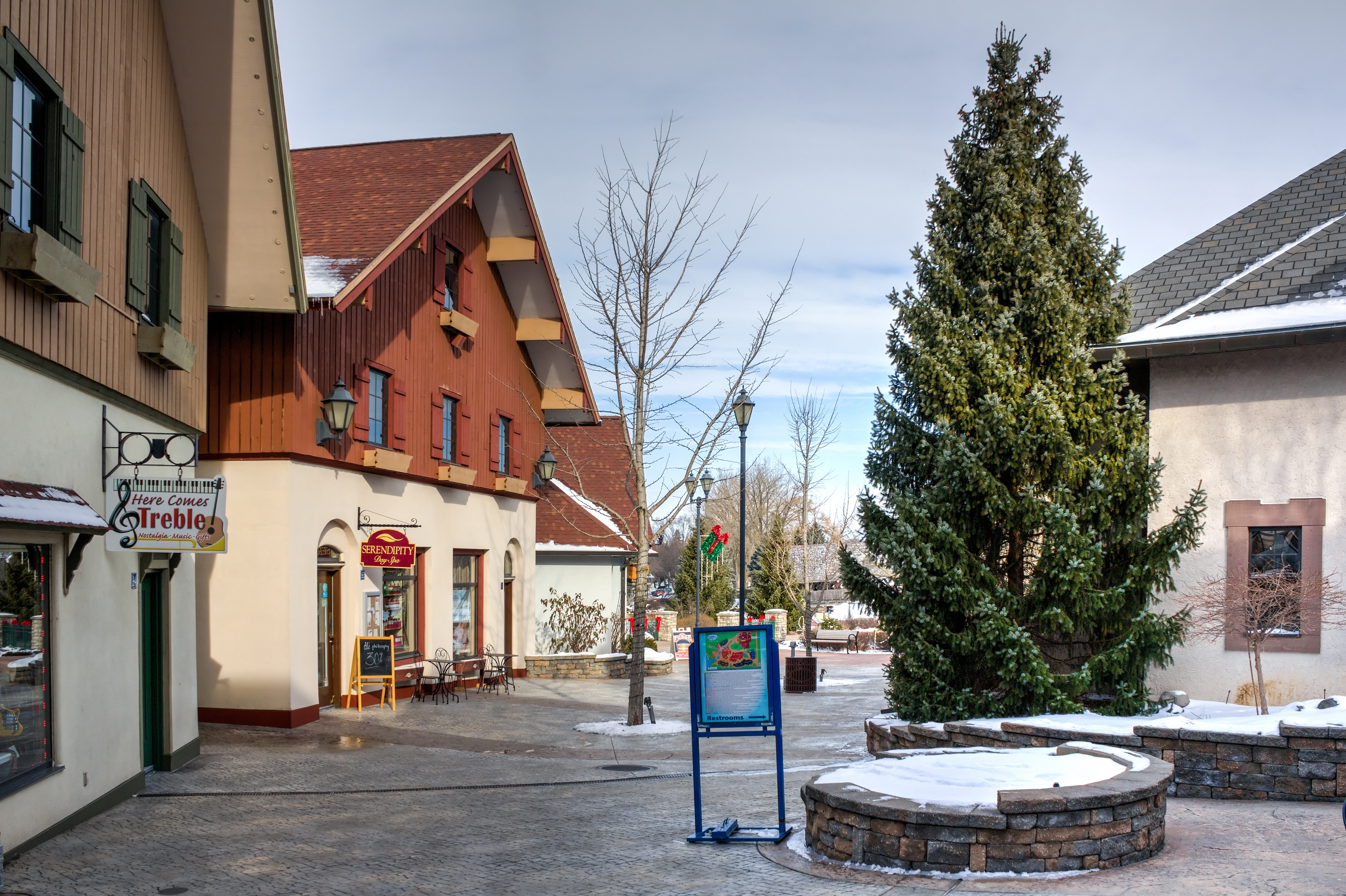
Frankemuth River Place Shops

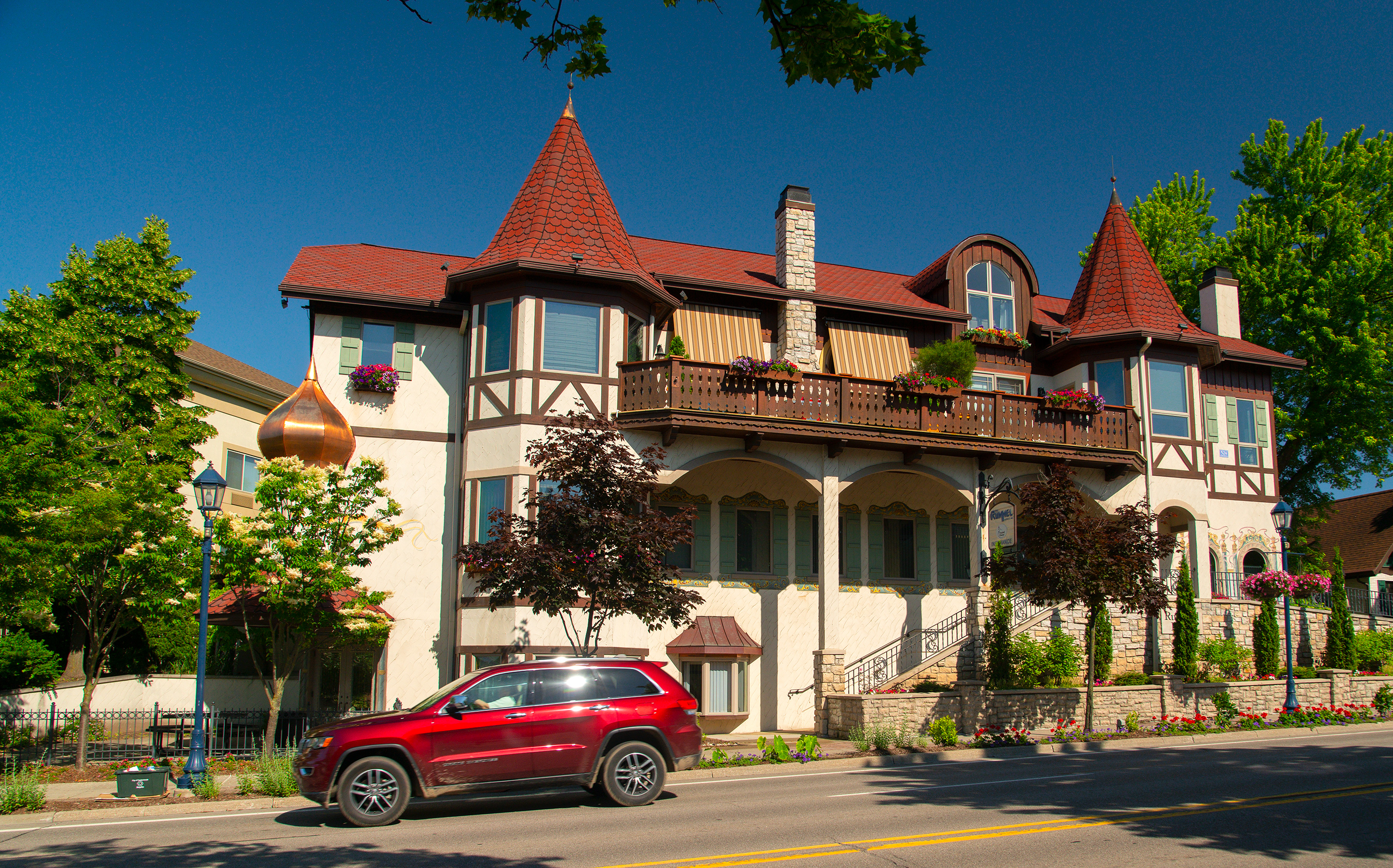
Rummel Platz building

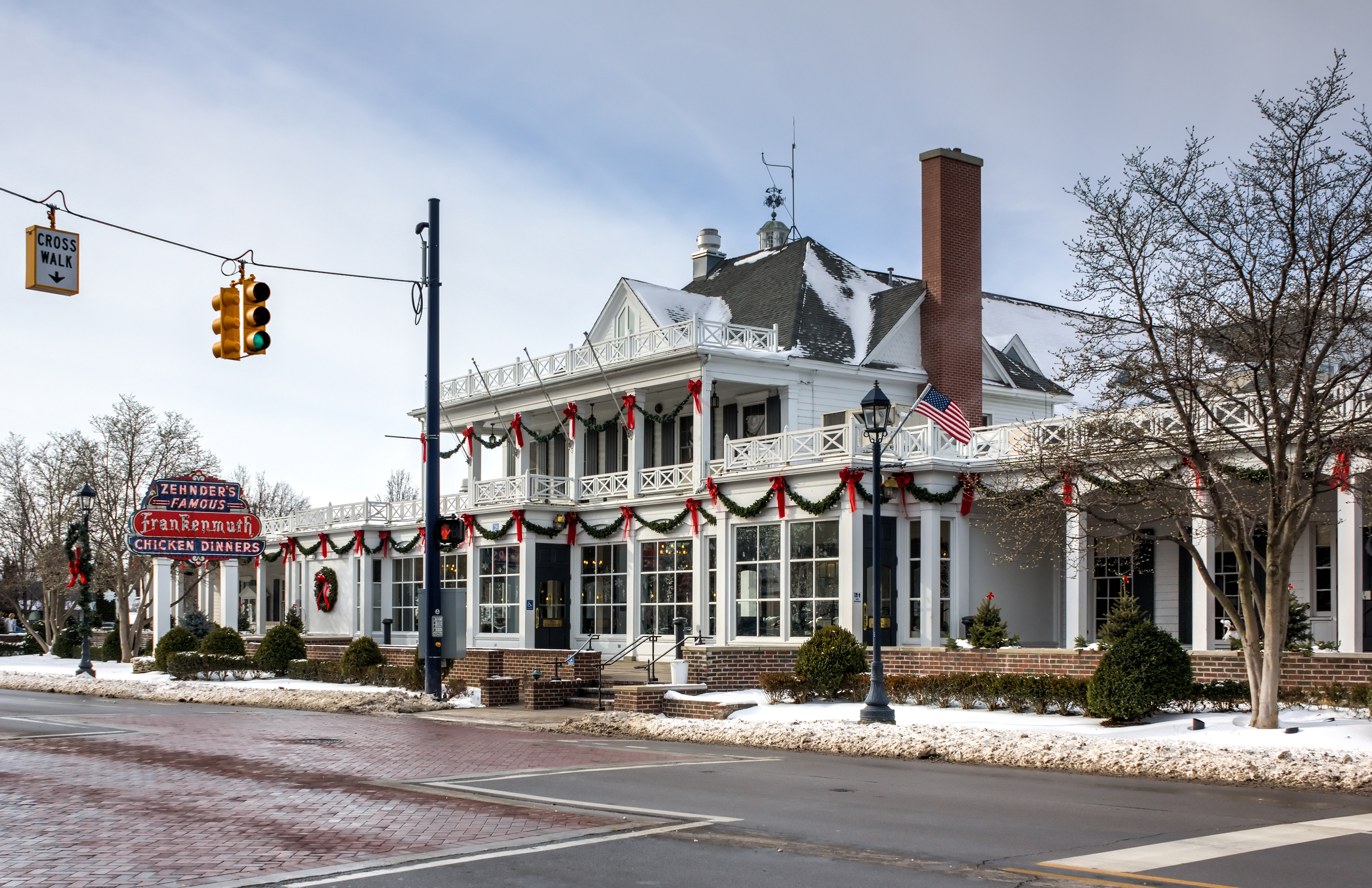
Zehnder's restaurant

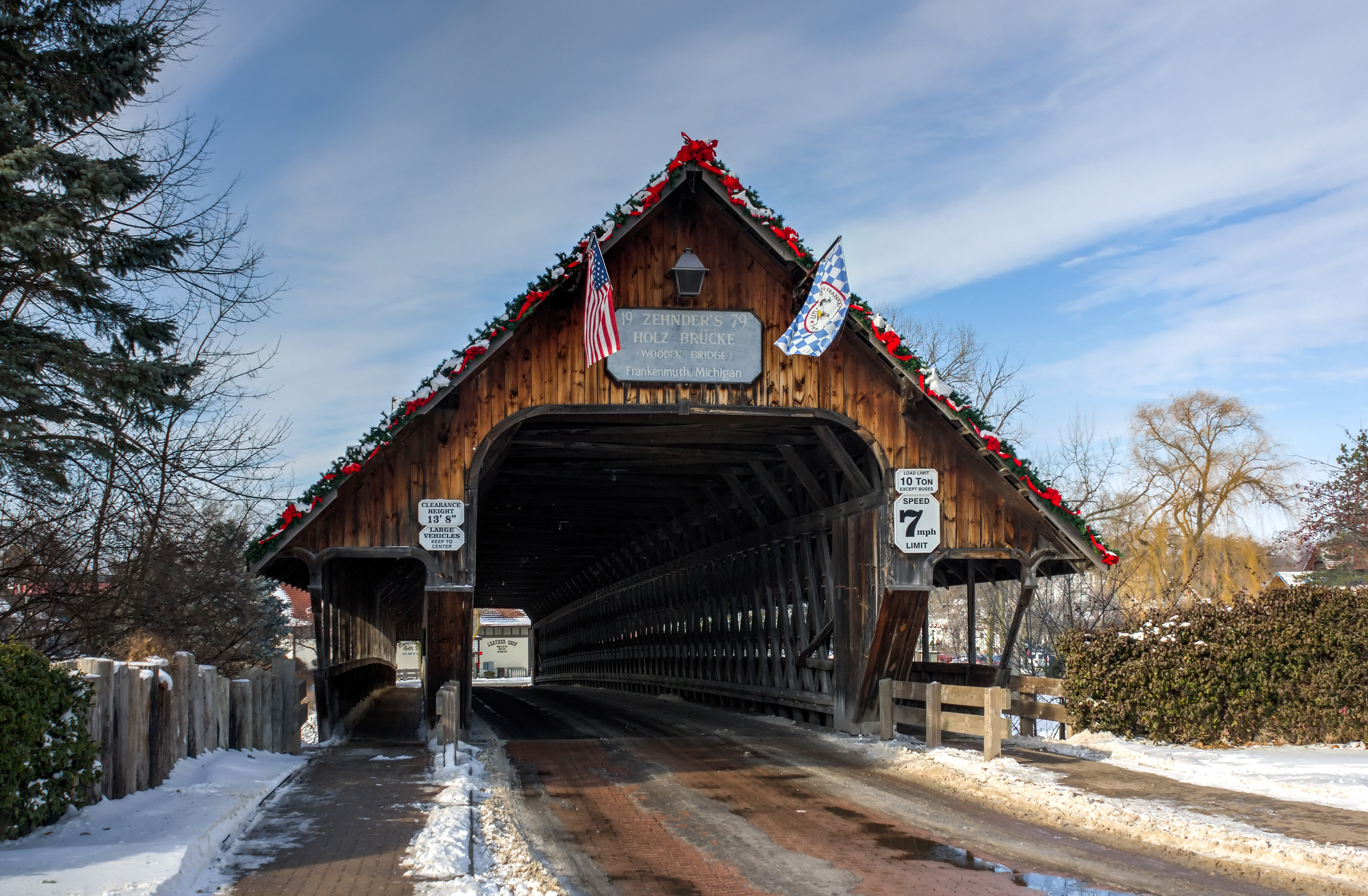
Covered bridge crossing the Cass River

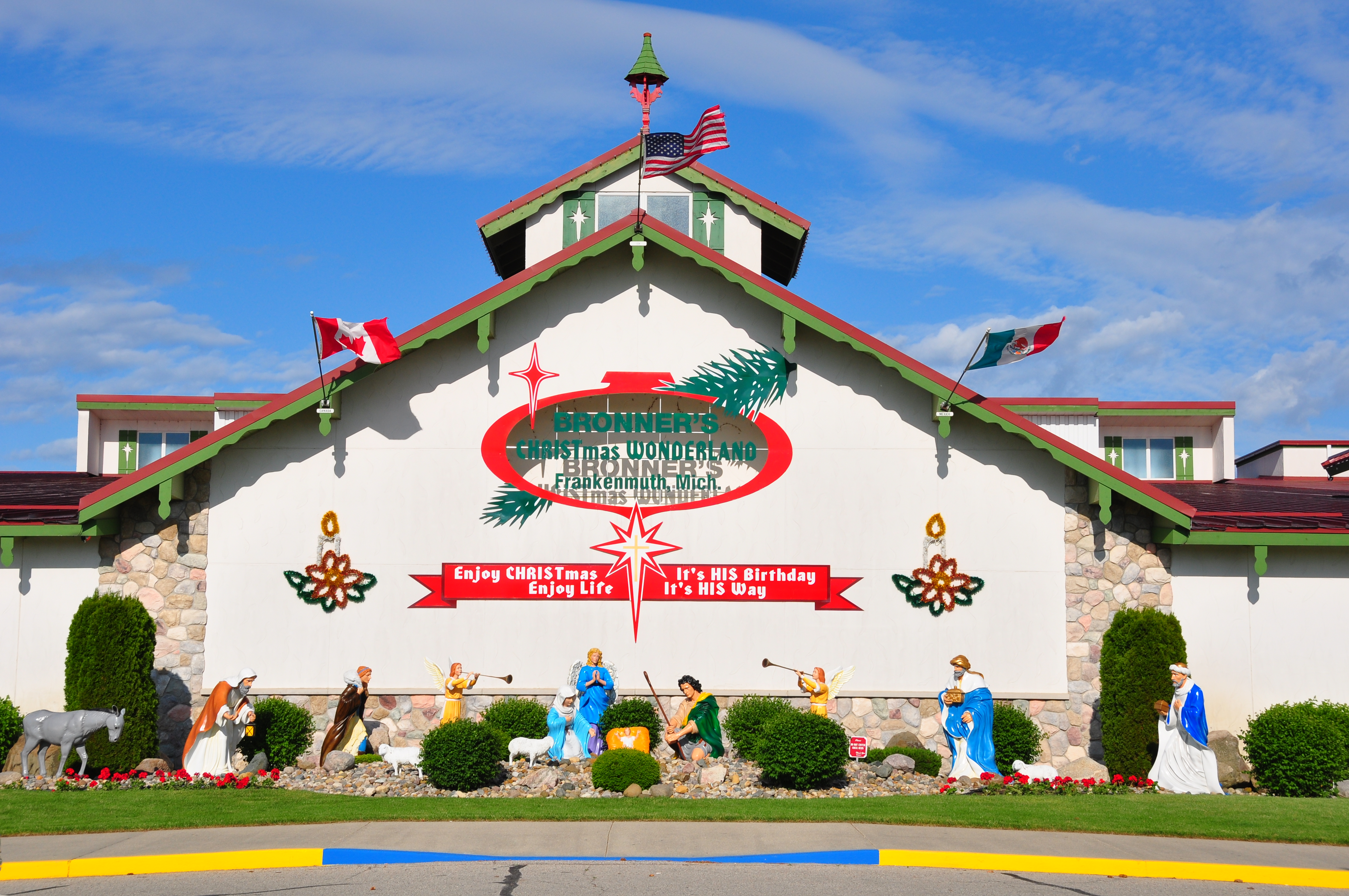
Bronner's Christmas Wonderland

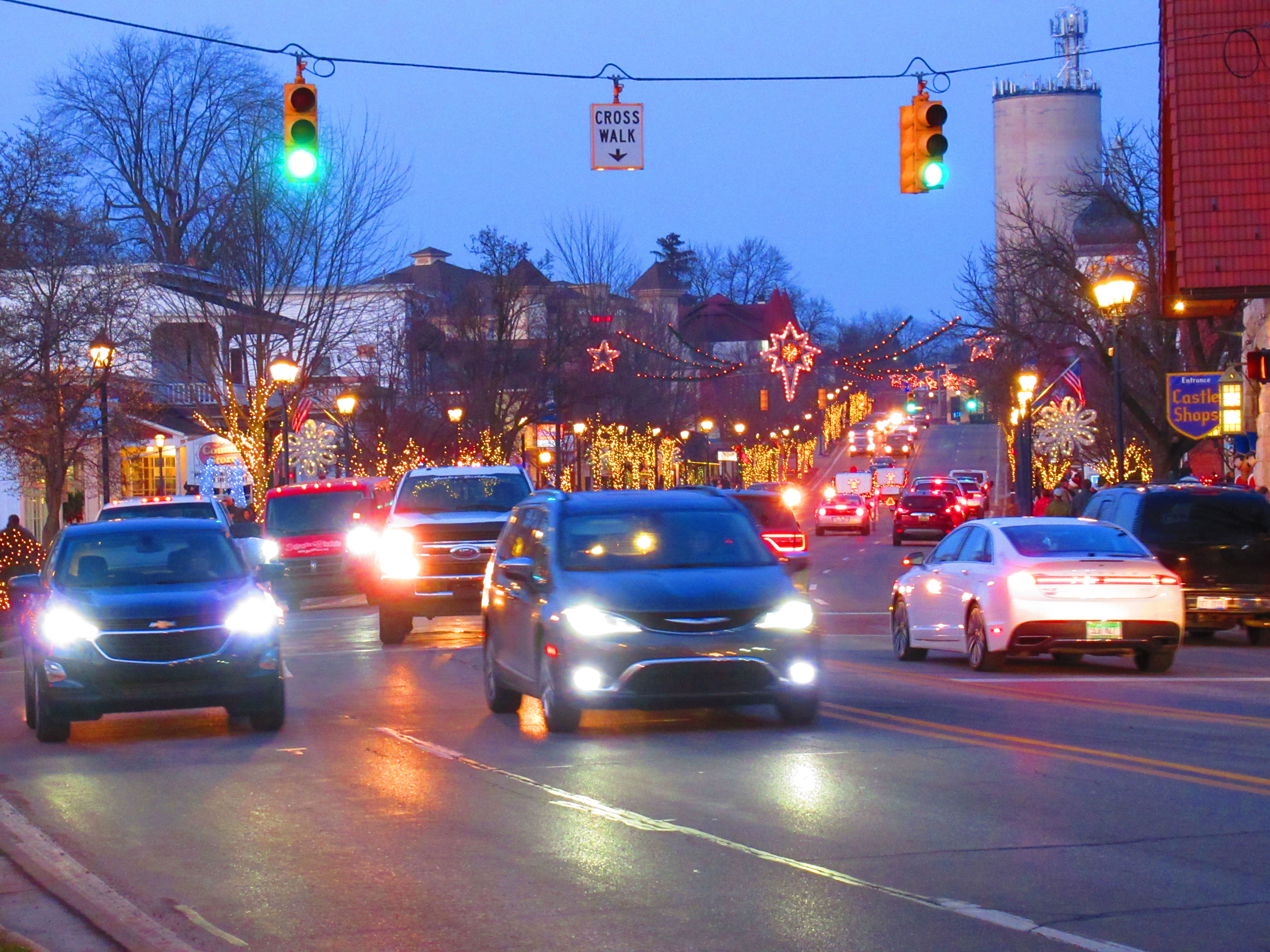
Christmas night scene in downtown Frankenmuth

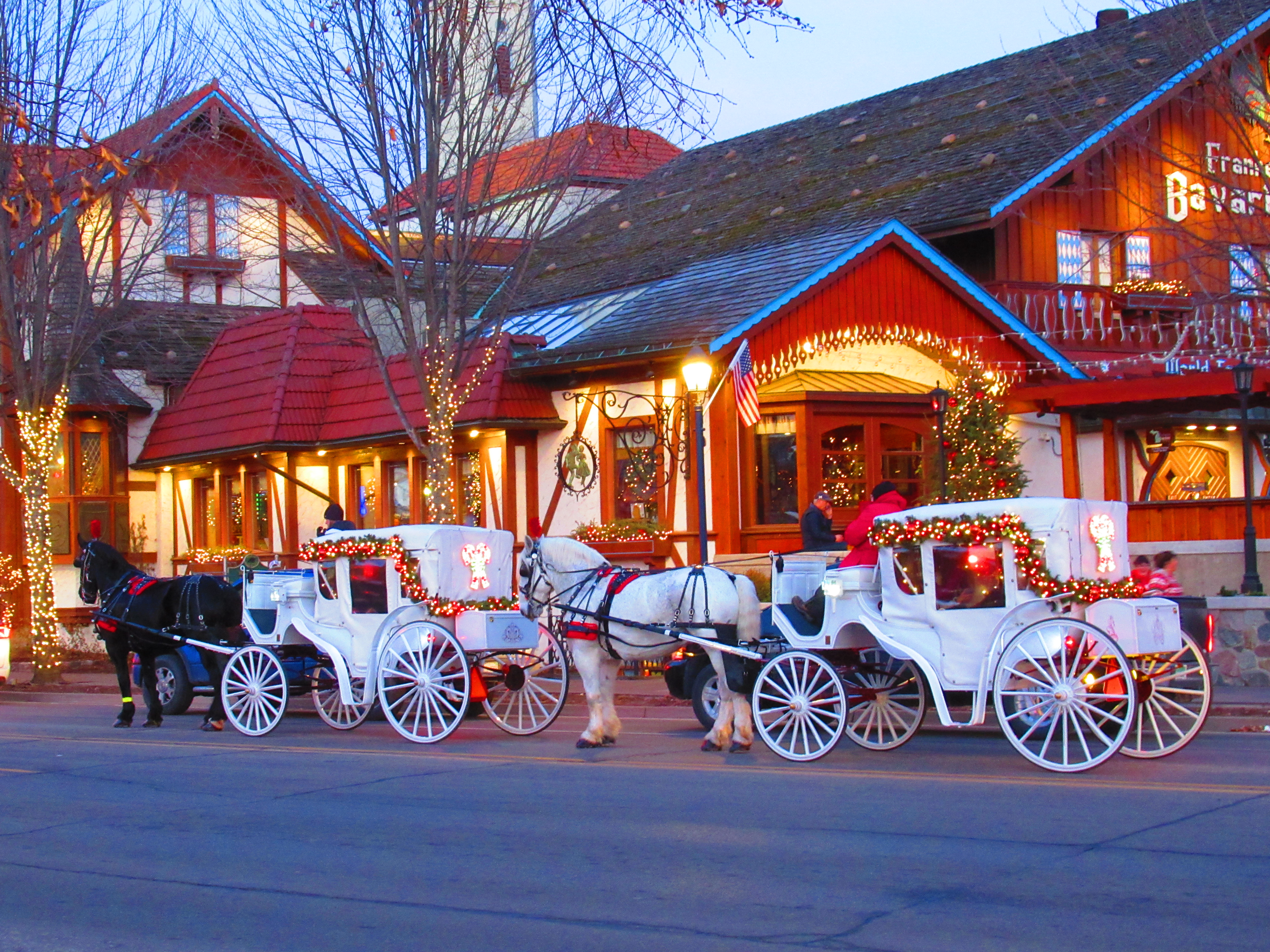
Horse and carriages along Main Street

== See also ==
- Helen, Georgia
- Leavenworth, Washington
- Solvang, California
