= Bay City, Michigan =

- City
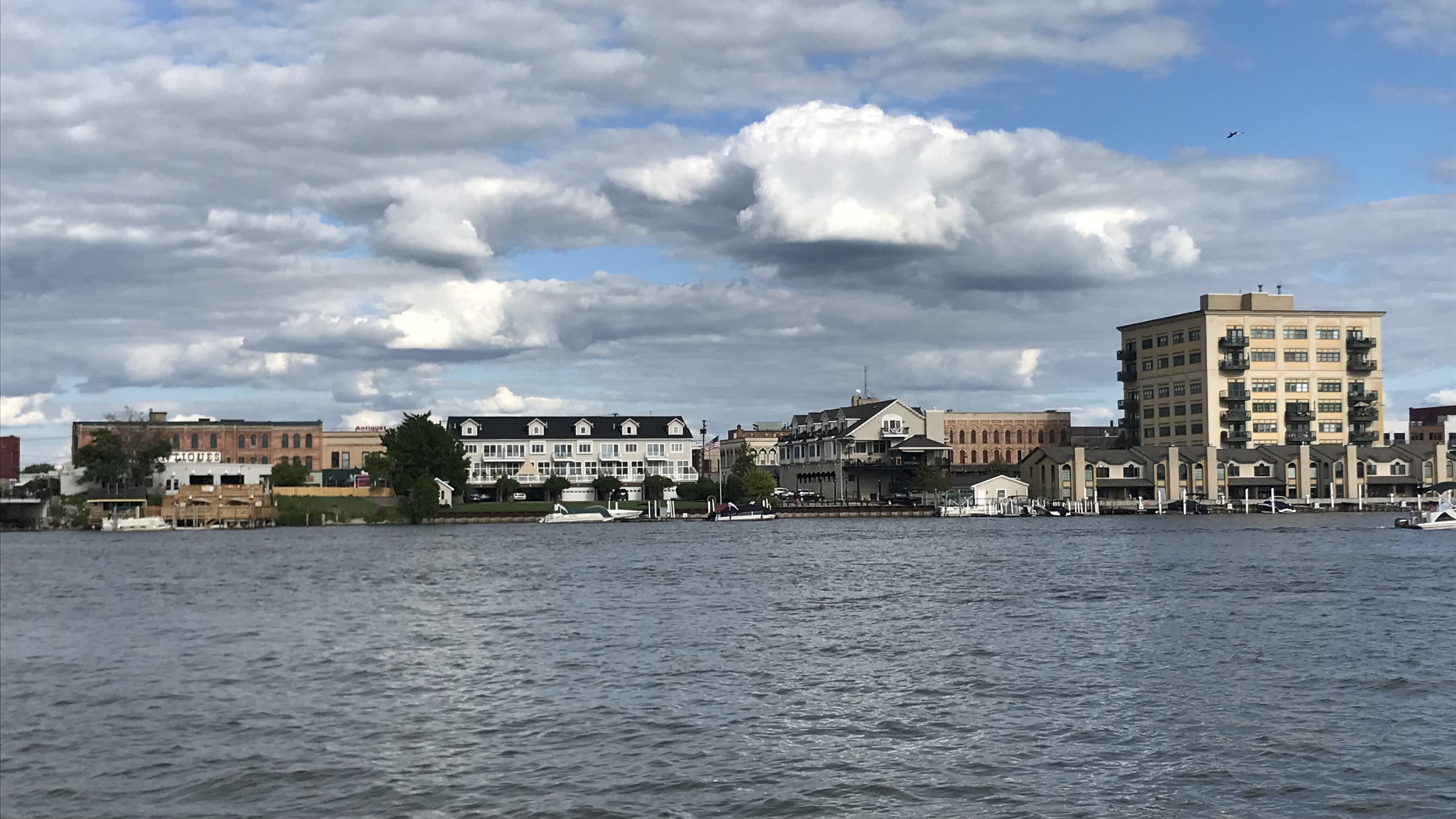
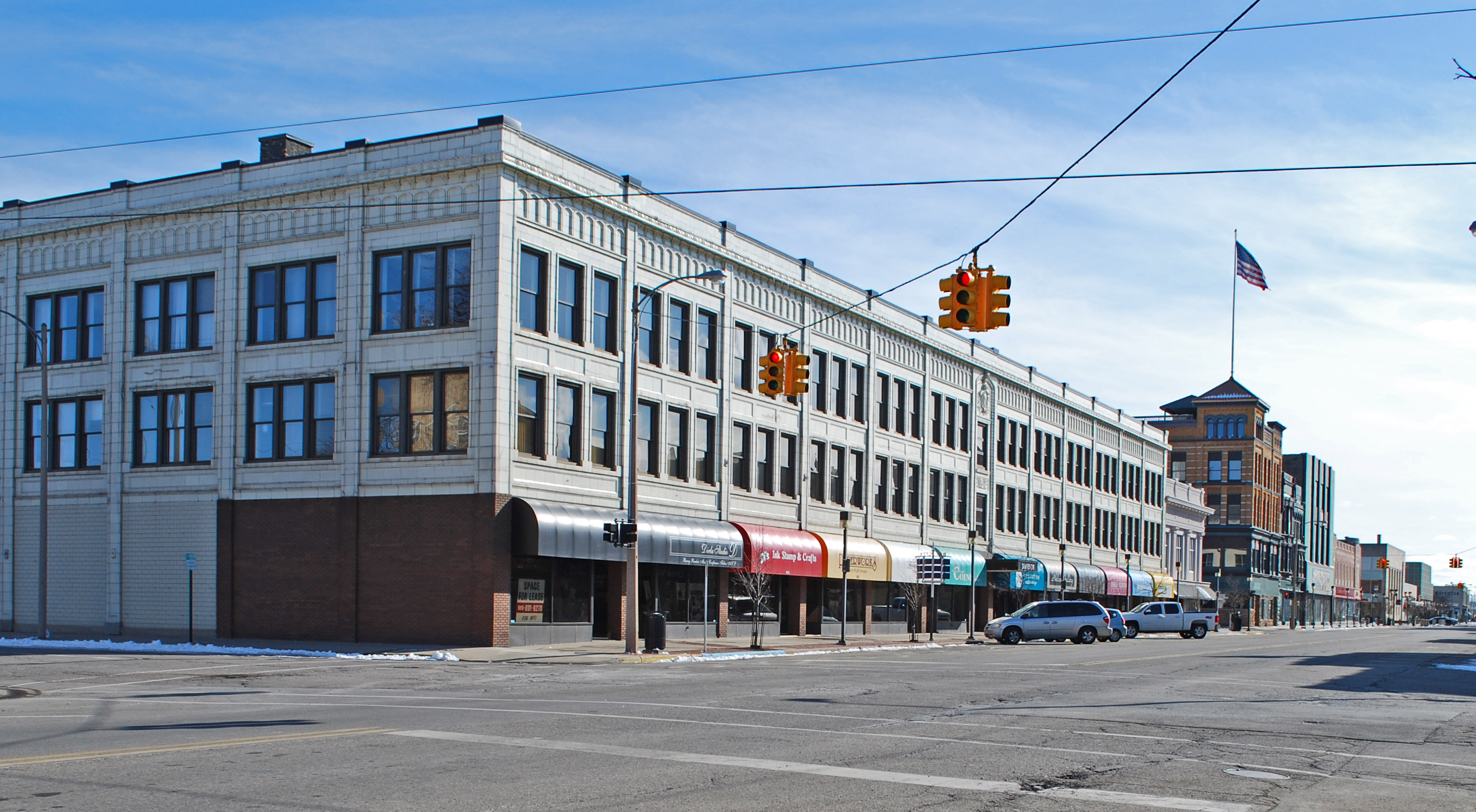
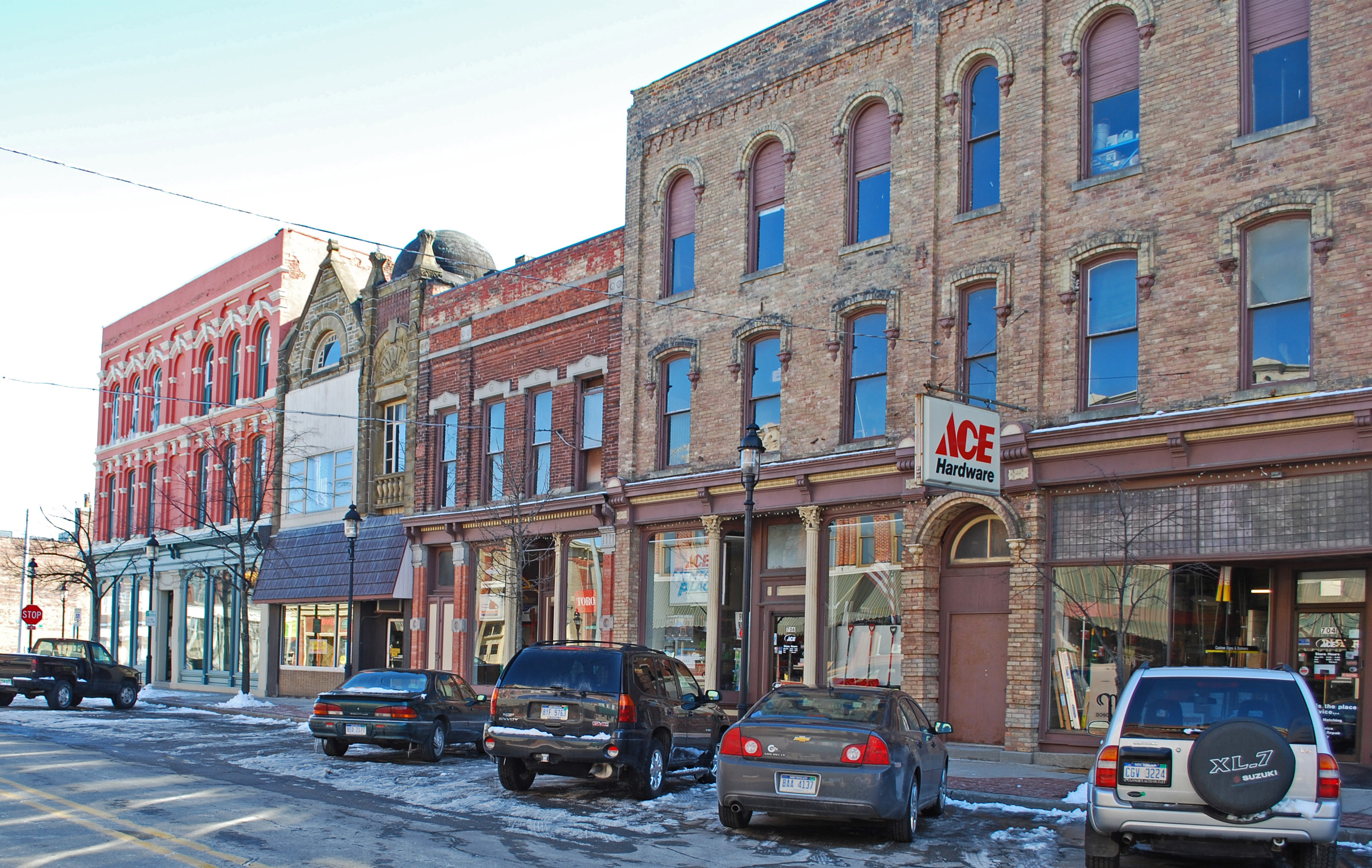
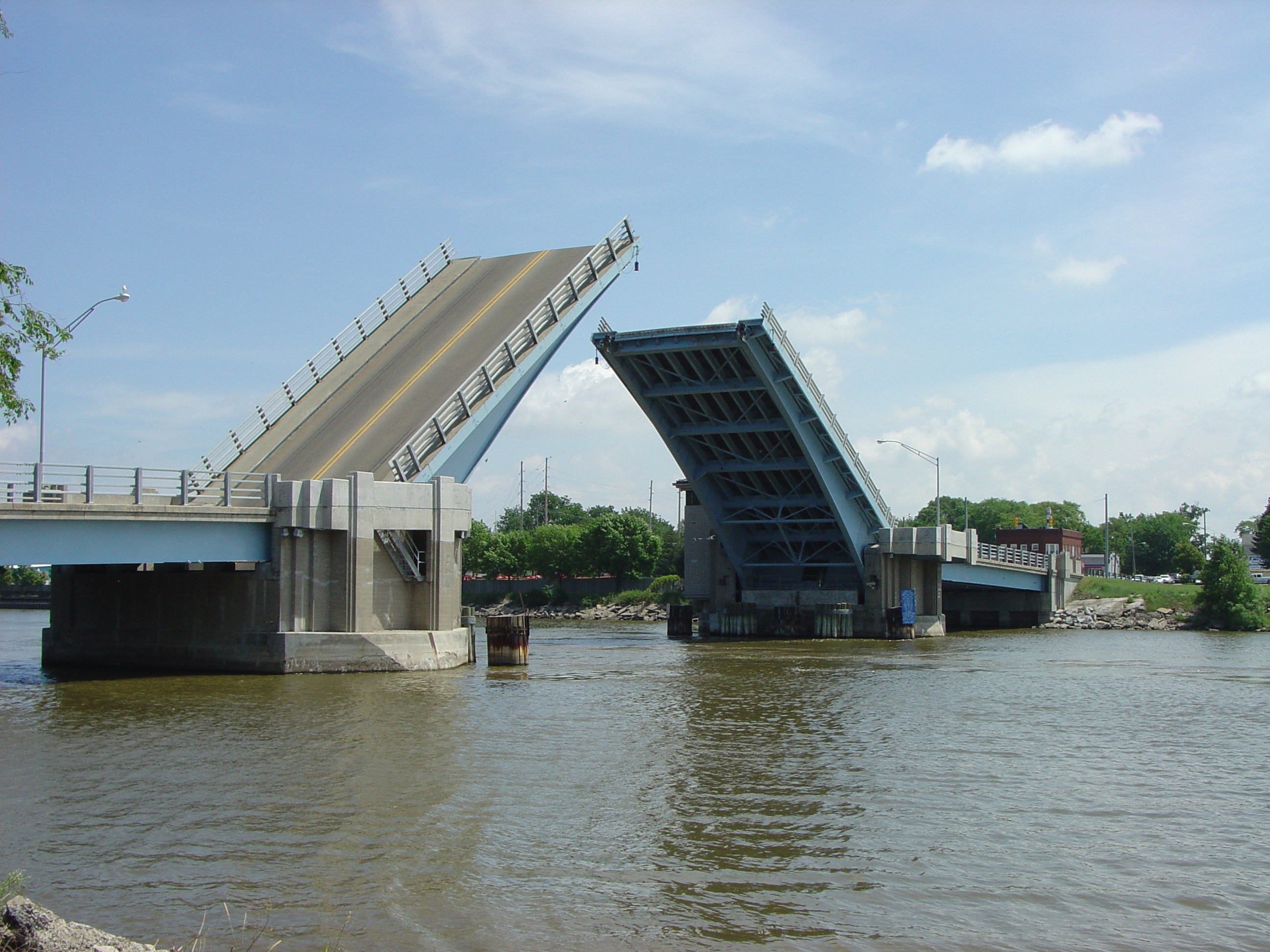
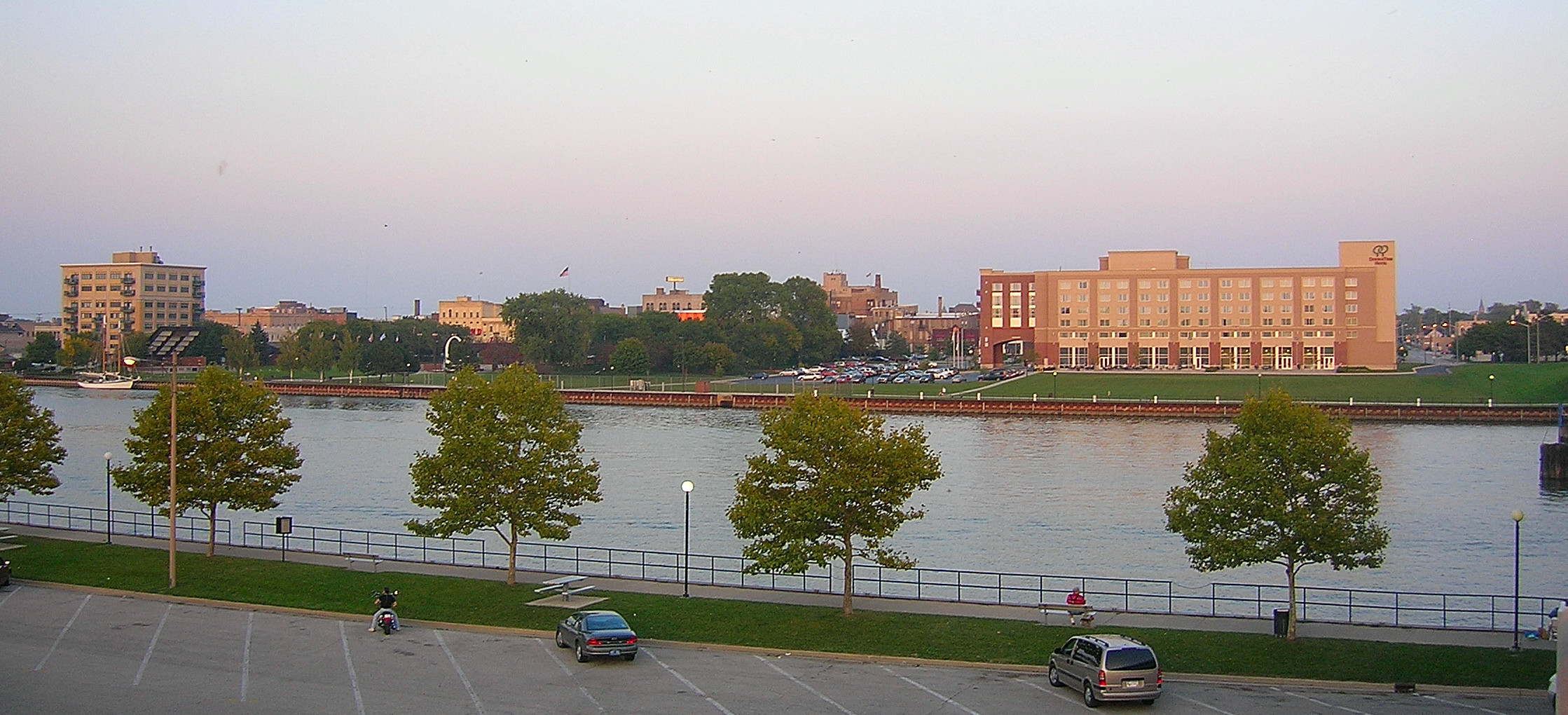
- Bay City from across the Saginaw River Downtown Midland Street Lafayette Avenue Bridge Veterans Memorial Park

- Flag

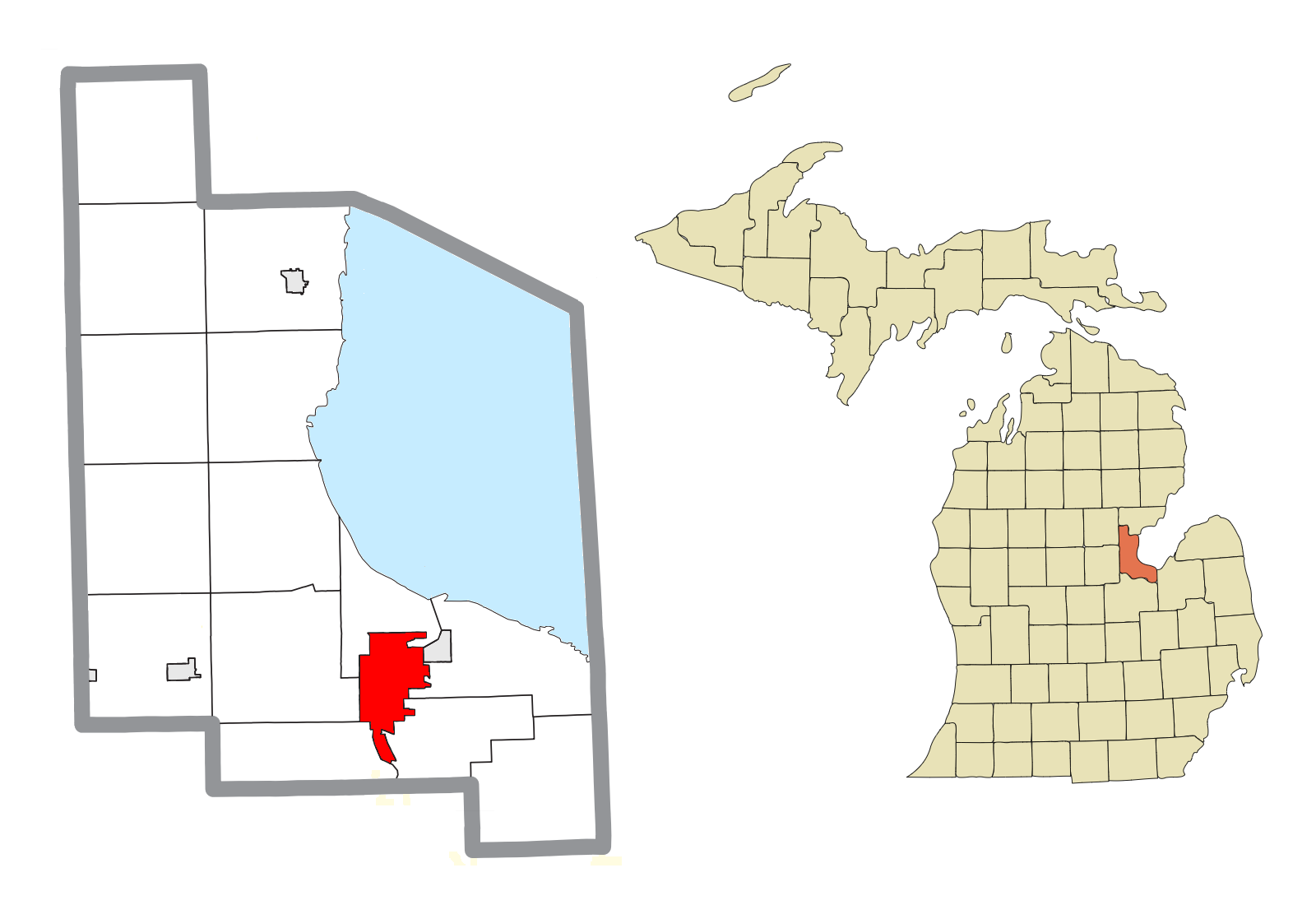
- Location within Bay County

- Location within the state of Michigan Location within the United States
- Coordinates: 43°35′42″N 83°53′19″W
- Country: United States
- State: Michigan
- County: Bay
- Settled: 1831
- Incorporated: 1865

Government
  - Type: Council–manager
  - Mayor: Christopher Girard
  - Manager: Dana Muscott

Area
  - City: 11.20 sq mi (29.01 km^{2})
  - Land: 10.17 sq mi (26.33 km^{2})
  - Water: 1.03 sq mi (2.68 km^{2})
- Elevation: 585 ft (178.3 m)

Population (2020)
  - City: 32,661
  - Density: 3,212.9/sq mi (1,240.51/km^{2})
  - Urban: 70,585 (US: 390th)
  - Metro: 107,110 (US: 335th)
- Time zone: UTC-5 (EST)
  - Summer (DST): UTC-4 (EDT)
- ZIP code(s): 48706–48708
- Area code: 989
- FIPS code: 26-06020
- GNIS feature ID: 0620777
- Website: www.baycitymi.gov

Bay City is a city in Bay County, Michigan, United States, and its county seat. The population was 32,661 at the 2020 census. The city is located just upriver from the Saginaw Bay on the Saginaw River. It is the principal city of the Bay City metropolitan area, which is coterminous with Bay County as part of the larger Greater Tri-Cities region of Central Michigan. Several historic bridges cross the Saginaw River in Bay City, including Liberty Bridge, Veterans Memorial Bridge, Independence Bridge, and Lafayette Avenue Bridge.

== History ==
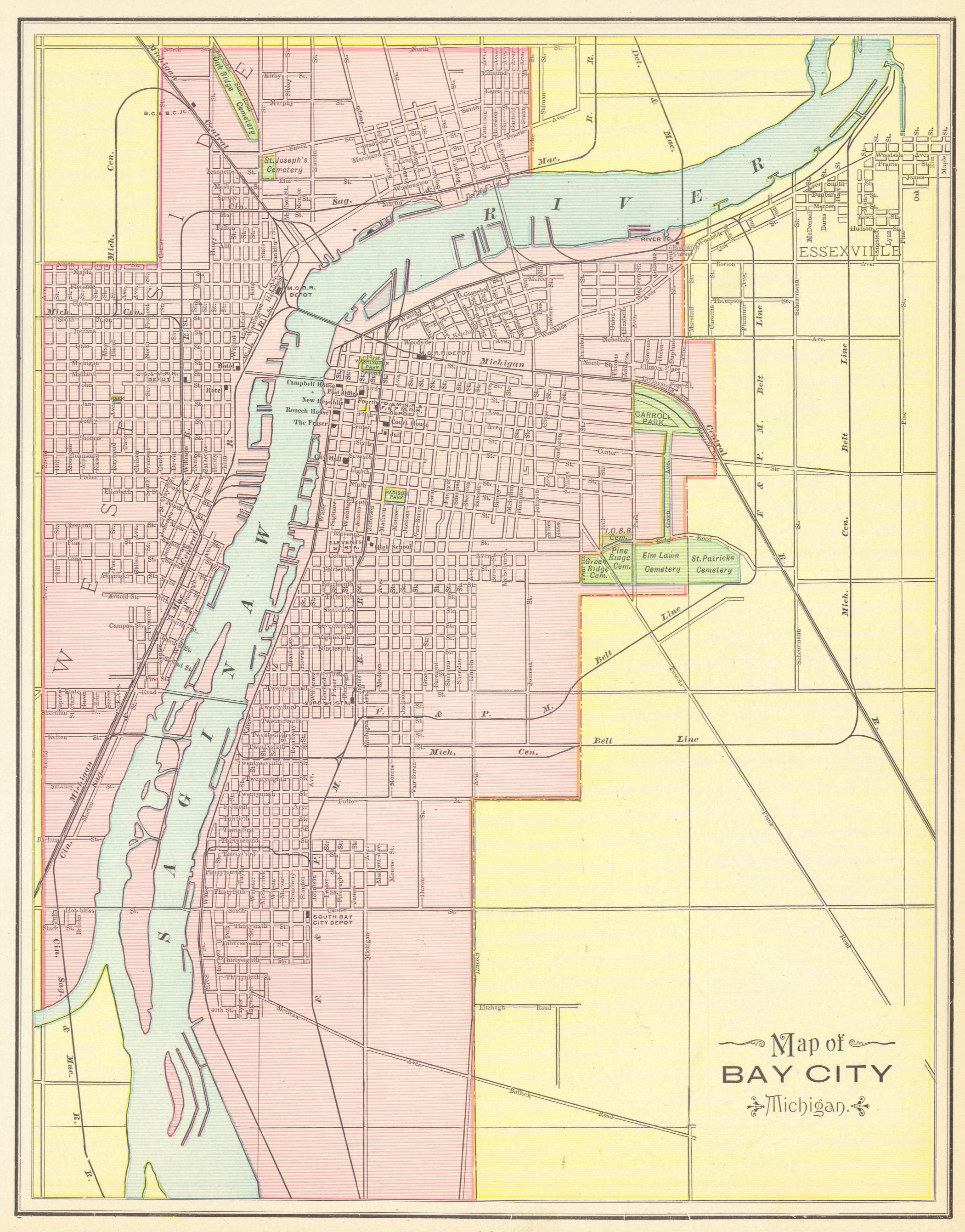
Bay City Street Map, 1898

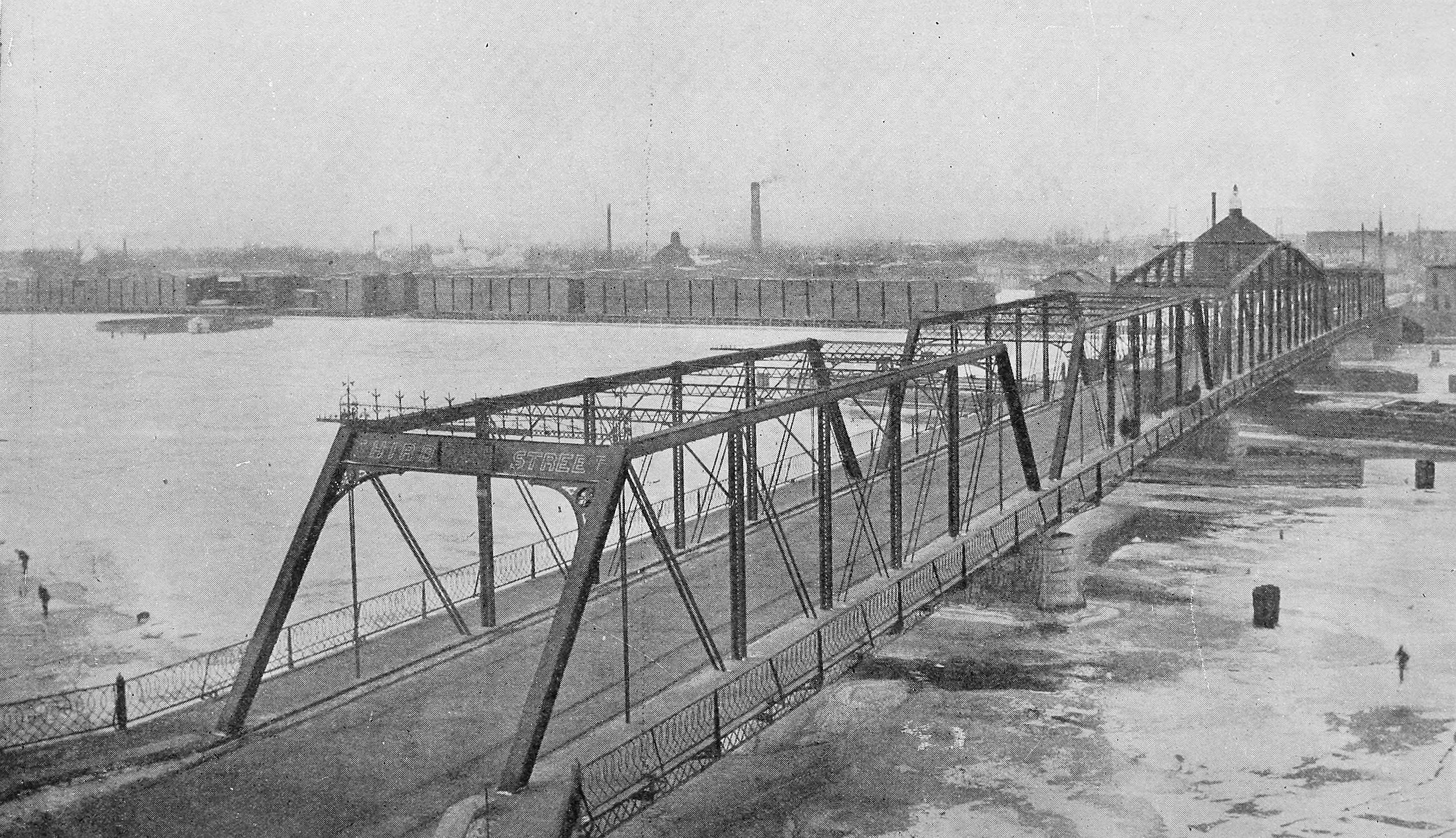
Third Street Bridge, with Sage Mill in background, 1918. The bridge collapsed in 1976 after being hit by a freighter.

Leon Tromblé is regarded as the first settler within the limits of Bay County, in an area which would become Bay City. In 1831, he built a log cabin on the east bank of the Saginaw river.

Bay City was first established in 1837 and was incorporated as a city in 1865. In 1834 John B. Trudell built a log-cabin near the present corner of Seventeenth and Broadway. Trudell later purchased land that extended from his residence north along the river to what later became the location for the Industrial Brownhoist, making him the first permanent resident of what has become Bay County. Bay City became the largest community in the county and the location of the county seat of government. Most of the county's agencies and associations are located here. The city shares common borders with Essexville and the townships of Bangor, Frankenlust, Hampton, Merritt, Monitor, and Portsmouth.

Bay City was originally known as Lower Saginaw, and fell within the boundaries of Saginaw County. On June 4, 1846, the Hapton, or Hampton, Post Office opened to service Lower Saginaw. The community was placed in Bay County, when the county was organized in 1857. It was at this time that the name was changed to Bay City. The Post Office changed its name to Bay City on March 22, 1858.

While Saginaw had the first non-native settlement in this area in 1819, larger ships had difficulty navigating the shallower water near the Saginaw settlement. Many of the early pioneers moved to Lower Saginaw as it became clear its deeper waters made it a better location for the growth of industry which relied on shipping. By 1860, Lower Saginaw had become a bustling community of about 2,000 people with several mills and many small businesses in operation. In 1865, the village of Bay City was incorporated as a city. Rapid economic growth took place during this time period, with lumbering, milling, and shipbuilding creating many jobs. The early industrialists in the area used the Saginaw River as a convenient means to float lumber to the mills and factories and as a consequence amass large fortunes. Many of the mansions built during this era are registered as historical landmarks by the state and federal government.

In 1873, Charles C. Fitzhugh, Jr., a Bay City pioneer, and his wife, Jane, purchased land and built a home on property bounded by Washington, Saginaw, Ninth and Tenth Streets, which later became the location for City Hall. Fitzhugh dealt on a large scale in wild lands and farms, being an agent for over 25,000 acres (100 km^{2}) of land in Bay County. During this time, Washington Avenue was primarily developed with residential homes. Businesses were concentrated along Water Street near the Saginaw River. As time went on, businesses started to expand along Washington Avenue. In 1891, the Fitzhughs sold the land to the City of Bay City for $8,500 "to be used for the erection of a City Hall and offices and for no other purposes whatever."

Bay City was limited to the east bank of the Saginaw River until 1905, when West Bay City was annexed.

During the latter half of the 19th century, Bay City was the home of several now-closed industries including many sawmills and shipyards. The Defoe Shipbuilding Company, which ceased operations December 31, 1975, built destroyer escorts, guided missile destroyers, and patrol craft for the United States Navy and the Royal Australian Navy. To maintain this strong Naval heritage, the Saginaw Valley Naval Ship Museum worked through the Naval Sea Systems Command to bring the USS Edson (DD-946) to Bay City as a museum ship. It was finally delivered to its temporary home in Essexville, Michigan, on August 7, 2012. Another important part of the city's industrial history is Industrial Brownhoist, which was well known for its construction of large industrial cranes.

At the outbreak of the First World War, Bay City contained a largely German neighborhood called Salzburg. The German-descended minority became the focus of extreme nativism and xenophobia. Pastors introduced English-language sermons for the first time in Salzburg but it did not catch on and sermons in Salzburg remained mostly German. The Salzburghers demanded that the rest of Bay City recognize them as Americans first and German-American second but hostility towards them continued. The governor of Michigan at the time, Albert Sleeper, sought support from the German-American community but experienced backlash. Even before the declaration of war against Germany, anti-German sentiment was so strong that hundreds of young men from Michigan had gone across the border to Canada to join the Canadian Armed Forces so as to be a part of the war effort.

=== Notable events ===
On December 23, 1906, Bay City's premier hotel, the Fraser House, burned to the ground.

Bay City's unusual Third Street Bridge was damaged by a freighter on June 17, 1976. The following morning, when the swing span was operated, one half crashed into the Saginaw River blocking all riverine traffic. A river crossing was never reinstated at that location.

On December 10, 1977, a deadly fire claimed the lives of 10 at the Wenonah Hotel (Wenonah Park Apartments) in downtown Bay City. The hotel had been built on the site of the Fraser House, which had also succumbed to a fiery end. The Wenonah Hotel was located at the corner of Center Ave and Water Street, the current site of the Delta College Planetarium. Built in 1907, the four-storey Wenonah Hotel had been converted into apartments at the time of the fire. Strong winds and cold weather hampered the efforts of the fire department. There was some controversy over the cause of the fire (arson, electrical, or grease fire) and it remains the deadliest fire in Bay County history.

On Christmas Eve, 1979, a large Bay City department store of long standing, Oppenheim's, was destroyed by fire.

In September 1990, the tankship MV Jupiter was unloading gasoline at the Total Petroleum Terminal. A passing cargo ship, MV Buffalo, moving at excessive speed, created a wake that caused Jupiter to break free of its berth. A fire and explosion ensued, and one man drowned. There was considerable legal action taken, ultimately resulting in an adjudication that was subsequently appealed by the owners of Buffalo. The findings of the Court of Appeals upheld the original decision, which assigned 50% of the responsibility to Buffalo (for her excessive speed), 25% to the dock operator (for rotten wood pilings) and 25% to Jupiter (for improper procedures in unloading her cargo).

In January 2009, Bay City's wholly owned municipal power company, Bay City Electric Light and Power, installed a "limiter" device to restrict the receipt of power to the home of Marvin Schur, a 93-year-old customer who had failed to pay an outstanding bill in excess of $1,000. The Bay City Electric Light and Power policy was to install the limiter, and to notify the customer by trying to collect the amount due. City employees failed to knock on the door, and it was later found that Schur had a check already made out and had failed to mail it. Schur died from hypothermia in his home a few days later. The day following his death, Bay City Electric Light and Power removed the limiters from all households. It was later learned that Schur had willed his estate, estimated by his family to be in excess of $500,000, to Bay Regional Medical Center.

On October 12, 2010, the historic 113-year-old City Hall sustained significant damage as the result of an attic fire which caused the sprinkler system to run for nearly two hours. Most of the damage to the building was water damage from the sprinkler system and water used to fight the fire. The fire started in the midst of a $1.6 million roofing project. After an investigation, it was determined that a worker was using a grinder to cut off bolts in the area where the fire started, and sparks from the work started the blaze. Fire crews were on the scene for nearly five hours fighting the hard-to-access fire.

== Geography ==
According to the United States Census Bureau, the city has a total area of 11.21 square miles (29.03 km^{2}), of which 10.17 square miles (26.34 km^{2}) is land and 1.04 square miles (2.69 km^{2}) is water. Despite declining population, Bay City remains (by a narrow margin over Port Huron) as the largest U.S. city by population on or near Lake Huron, much smaller than the largest cities on the other four Great Lakes: (Chicago, Toronto, Cleveland, and Thunder Bay).

Bay City, along with Saginaw, and Midland make up the Tri-Cities Area, a sub-region of Flint/Tri-Cities. Bay City is sometimes regarded as being part of the greater Thumb of Michigan Area, which is also a sub-region of the Flint/Tri-Cities.

=== Neighborhoods ===
- West Bay City is a section of the city on the West side of the Saginaw River that was a former city.
- The Center Avenue Historic District is an area of the city with more than 250 buildings on the National Historic Register, many of them being old houses built during the lumber boom era in the state.

=== Business districts ===
- Banks Business District – Runs along Marquette Avenue from Ohio Street north to Harry S. Truman Parkway
- Broadway Avenue Business District – Extending from Lafayette Avenue south to McGraw Avenue
- Columbus Avenue Business District – From Washington Ave to Bay Medical Center Hospital
- Downtown Bay City – Between Madison Avenue and the Saginaw River.
- Johnson Street Business District – From Center Ave to Woodside St.
- Lafayette/Salzburg/Kosciuszko Business District – Extends along Salzburg east to Kosciuszko (Lafayette turns into Kosciuszko).
- The Midland Street Historic District – Located on the West side of the city near the banks of the river. Home to many popular bars in the city.
- Industrial Districts – Morton Street, Harrison Street, Woodside Avenue, and the Marquette Industrial Center. Home to companies such as: General Motors Powertrain, SC Johnson & Son, Carbone of America/Ultra Carbon Division, Kerkau Manufacturing, Gougeon, and York Electric
- Bay City Town Center area (not located within the city limits, but in the adjoining township of Bangor Township) – Wilder Road at State Street Road.
- Water Street – home to Michigan's largest antique district
- Uptown Bay City - located along the Saginaw River, just south of Veteran's Bridge.

=== Climate ===
This climatic region is typified by large seasonal temperature differences, with warm to hot (and often humid) summers and cold (sometimes severely cold) winters. According to the Köppen Climate Classification system, Bay City has a humid continental climate, abbreviated "Dfb" on climate maps.

== Demographics ==
Historical population
Census	Pop.	Note	%±
1860	1,583		—
1870	7,064		346.2%
1880	20,693		192.9%
1890	27,839		34.5%
1900	27,628		−0.8%
1910	45,166		63.5%
1920	47,554		5.3%
1930	47,355		−0.4%
1940	47,956		1.3%
1950	52,523		9.5%
1960	53,604		2.1%
1970	49,449		−7.8%
1980	41,593		−15.9%
1990	38,936		−6.4%
2000	36,817		−5.4%
2010	34,932		−5.1%
2020	32,661		−6.5%
2023 (est.)	32,082		−1.8%
U.S. Decennial Census; 2018 Estimate

=== 2020 census ===
As of the 2020 census, Bay City had a population of 32,661. The population density was 3,212.77 inhabitants per square mile (1,240.5/km^{2}). The median age was 38.9 years; 4.8% of residents were under age 5, 21.9% were under age 18, and 16.0% were 65 years of age or older. For every 100 females there were 96.7 males, and for every 100 females age 18 and over there were 94.6 males age 18 and over.

100.0% of residents lived in urban areas, while 0.0% lived in rural areas.

There were 14,262 households in Bay City, of which 26.3% had children under the age of 18 living in them. Of all households, 32.7% were married-couple households, 23.3% were households with a male householder and no spouse or partner present, and 33.6% were households with a female householder and no spouse or partner present. The average household size was 2.25, and the average family size was 3.04. About 36.5% of all households were made up of individuals and 13.2% had someone living alone who was 65 years of age or older.

There were 15,798 housing units, of which 9.7% were vacant. The homeowner vacancy rate was 1.9% and the rental vacancy rate was 10.4%.

The median income for a household in the city was $41,959, and the per capita income was $25,141. About 23.6% of persons were in poverty.

Racial composition as of the 2020 census
Race	Number	Percent
White	27,458	84.1%
Black or African American	1,070	3.3%
American Indian and Alaska Native	210	0.6%
Asian	165	0.5%
Native Hawaiian and Other Pacific Islander	1	0.0%
Some other race	739	2.3%
Two or more races	3,018	9.2%
Hispanic or Latino (of any race)	3,272	10.0%

=== 2010 census ===
As of the census of 2010, there were 34,932 people, 14,436 households, and 8,546 families residing in the city. The population density was 3,434.8 inhabitants per square mile (1,326.2/km^{2}). There were 15,923 housing units at an average density of 1,565.7 per square mile (604.5/km^{2}). The racial makeup of the city was 89.7% White, 3.5% Black, 0.6% Native American, 0.5% Asian, 1.8% from other races, and 3.9% from two or more races. Hispanic or Latino of any race were 8.5% of the population.

There were 14,436 households, of which 31.7% had children under the age of 18 living with them, 37.0% were married couples living together, 16.6% had a female householder with no husband present, 5.6% had a male householder with no wife present, and 40.8% were non-families. 33.7% of all households were made up of individuals, and 11.3% had someone living alone who was 65 years of age or older. The average household size was 2.38, and the average family size was 3.04.

The median age in the city was 35.8 years. 24.9% of residents were under the age of 18; 9.7% were between the ages of 18 and 24; 27.2% were from 25 to 44; 25.8% were from 45 to 64; and 12.3% were 65 years of age or older. The gender makeup of the city was 48.7% male and 51.3% female.

=== 2000 census ===
As of the census of 2000, there were 36,817 people, 15,208 households, and 9,322 families residing in the city. The population density was 3,537.1 inhabitants per square mile (1,365.7/km^{2}). There were 16,259 housing units at an average density of 1,562.0 per square mile (603.1/km^{2}). The racial makeup of the city was 91.19% White, 2.72% Black, 0.74% Native American, 0.53% Asian, 0.01% Pacific Islander, 2.47% from other races, and 2.33% from two or more races. Hispanic or Latino of any race were 6.72% of the population.

There were 15,208 households, out of which 30.2% had children under the age of 18 living with them, 42.4% were married couples living together, 14.7% had a female householder with no husband present, and 38.7% were non-families. 32.9% of all households were made up of individuals, and 12.8% had someone living alone who was 65 years of age or older. The average household size was 2.38 and the average family size was 3.04.

In the city, the population was spread out, with 25.5% under the age of 18, 9.4% from 18 to 24, 30.5% from 25 to 44, 20.5% from 45 to 64, and 14.1% who were 65 years of age or older. The median age was 35 years. For every 100 females, there were 92.9 males. For every 100 females age 18 and over, there were 88.6 males.

The median income for a household in the city was $30,425, and the median income for a family was $38,252. Males had a median income of $32,094 versus $21,494 for females. The per capita income for the city was $16,550. About 10.3% of families and 14.6% of the population were below the poverty line, including 19.1% of those under age 18 and 10.5% of those age 65 or over.

== Economy ==
=== Top employers ===
According to Bay City's 2022 Comprehensive Annual Financial Report, the top ten employers in the city are:

#	Employer	# of Employees
1	McLaren Bay Region	1,880
2	Bay City Public Schools	792
3	Bay County	589
4	S. C. Johnson & Son	450
5	General Motors Powertrain	432
6	City of Bay City	291
7	Go-To Transport	250
8	Dow Bay Area Family YMCA	239
9	Bay Arenac Behavioral Health	229
10	Mersen USA	170

Michigan Sugar is also based in Bay City.

== Arts and culture ==
Bay City is well known in Mid-Michigan for its numerous festivals and celebrations which take place during the summer and autumn months. Among them are the River Roar, St. Stan's Polish Festival, the Bay City Fireworks Festival, Things That Go Bump in the Night Film Festival, and the River of Time living history reenactment. Many of these events take place along one or more banks of the Saginaw River, often in Wenonah Park on the east bank or the larger Veterans Memorial Park on the west bank.

The Bay County Historical Museum, located on Washington Avenue, is the designated repository for the records of the Patrol Craft Sailors Association and also contains numerous displays on local and regional history. Over the past several years, the museum has expanded significantly. It is housed in the former armory building on Washington Avenue, adjacent to the historic City Hall.

The Bay City Players, a volunteer-based community theatre, is the oldest continuously running community theater in Michigan.

The Bay County Library System includes two public libraries located in Bay City, the Alice & Jack Wirt Public Library and Sage Public Library.

The official Bay City flag is blue with the city logo on it. It has been changed from the original design.

The Hell's Half Mile Film and Music Festival is held annually in September. The festival features a mix of independent films with live indie music.

=== Sites of interest ===
- Appledore Tall Ships
- Studio 23/The Arts Center
- State Theatre
- Delta College Planetarium & Learning Center
- Bay County Civic Arena
- The Bay County Historical Museum
- Bay City State Recreation Area
- Saginaw Valley Naval Ship Museum (US Navy)

== Sports ==
Bay City is the home to the Tri-City Ice Hawks of the United States Premier Hockey League.

The Bay City Billikens and Bay City Wolves were a minor league baseball teams that were based in Bay City. The Wolves played as members of the Class B level Michigan-Ontario League from 1919 to 1926, winning league consecutive championships in 1923 and 1924. The "Billikens" were a Southern Michigan League team, with Bay City teams playing from 1907 to 1915 as members of the Class C league.

In 1926, the Wolves played a partial season in the Class B level Michigan State League, which was formed through a merger of the Central League and Michigan-Ontario League during the season. The Wolves captured the Michigan State League championship in their final season. The Bay City Wolves teams hosted minor league home games at Clarkston Park in Bay City.

== Government ==
Bay City has a Commission-Manager form of government. The Mayor, who is elected to a four-year term, is the presiding officer of the City Commission and has the power to appoint some board and commission members, with the approval of the City Commission. The Mayor of Bay City is Christopher Girard, whose term extends until December 2028. City operations are managed by the City Manager, who is chosen by the City Commission. Dana Muscott has been the City Manager for Bay City since 2017. The City Commission has nine members, one from each of the city's nine wards. City Commissioners as well as the Mayor serve four-year terms and are limited to two consecutive terms. Both the Mayor's seat and the City Commission are nonpartisan. Following the 2017-2019 Charter Commission and subsequent passage of the new charter, the years when Bay City elections are held changed. Formerly held in off-years (2009, 2013, 2017, etc.) the elections for odd-numbered commission seats are now held during mid-term/Gubernatorial election years, this began in 2022. Mayoral elections and elections for even-numbered commission seats are now held during Presidential election years, formerly being held in off-years (2011, 2015, 2017), this began in 2024.

The City of Bay City is located in the following districts:

- 8th U.S. Congressional District – Representative Kristen McDonald Rivet (D)
- 96th State House District – State Rep. Timothy Beson (R)
- 35th State Senate District – State Senator Chedrick Greene (D)

== Education ==
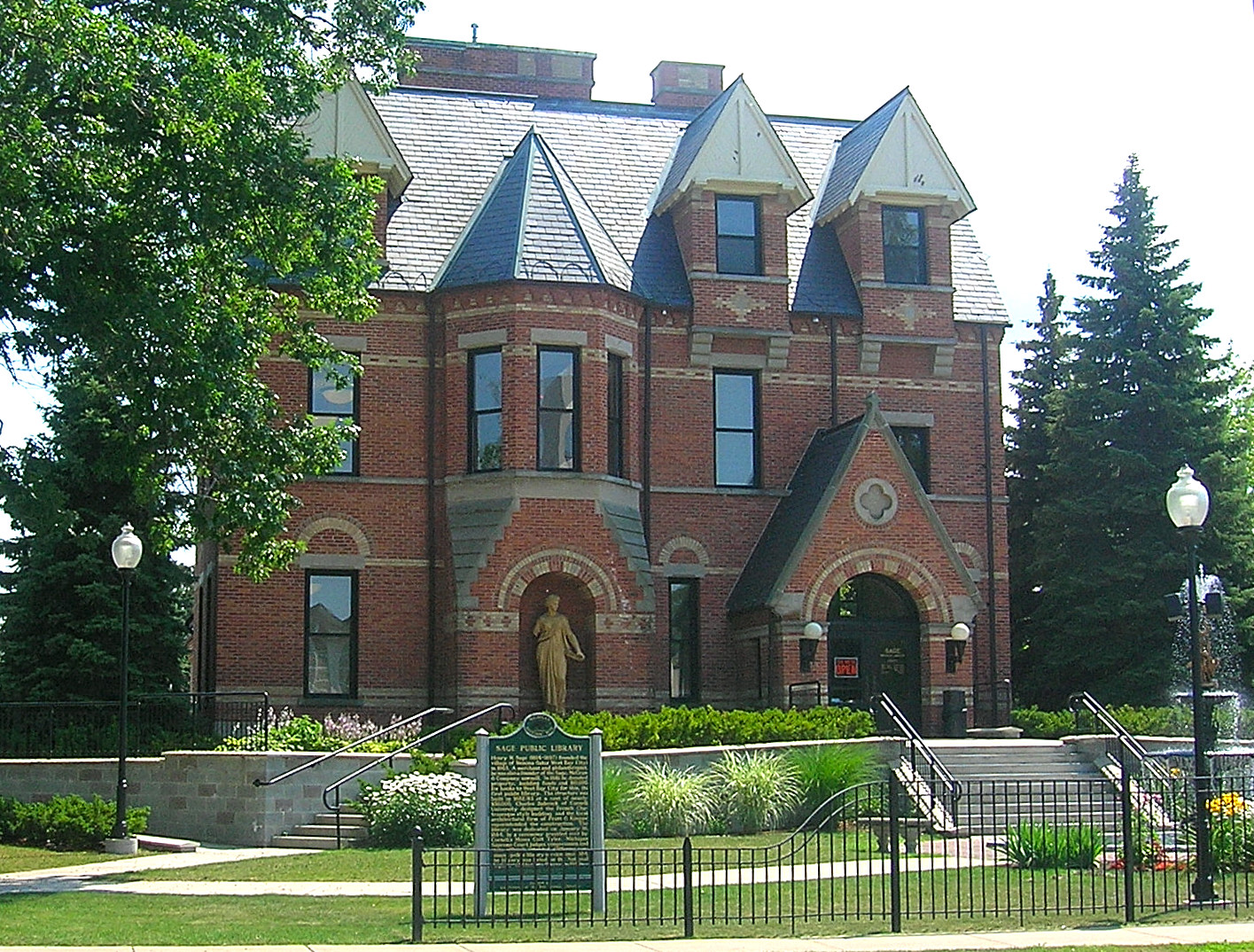
The Sage library

=== Primary/secondary education ===
Bay City Public Schools operates seven elementary schools, two middle schools, and three high schools.

- Bay City Central High School
- Bay City Western High School
- Bay City Eastern High School
- T. L. Handy Middle School
- Bay City Western Middle School
- McAlear-Sawden Elementary School
- Auburn Elementary School
- Hampton Elementary School
- Kolb Elementary School
- MacGregor Elementary School
- Mackensen Elementary School
- Washington Elementary School

Bangor Township Schools operates one high school, one middle schools, three elementary school, one preschool, and one virtual school.

- John Glenn High School
- Christa McAuliffe Middle School
- Central Elementary School
- Lincoln Elementary School
- West Elementary School
- North Preschool
- Bangor Township Virtual School

Essexville Hampton Public Schools operates one high, school one middle school, and two elementary schools.

- Garber High School
- Cramer Junior High School
- Verellen Elementary School
- Bush Elementary School

Bay Area Catholic Schools operates four elementary schools, one middle school, and one high school.

- All Saints Central High School

Bay-Arenac Community High School operates a charter alternative secondary school.

- Bay-Arenac Community High School

Mosaica Education Inc. operates a charter school, Bay County Public School Academy, serving grades kindergarten through 8th grade.

The Wisconsin Evangelical Lutheran Synod has three grade schools in Bay City: Bethel Lutheran School (Pre-K-8), St. John's Lutheran School (Pre-K-8), and Trinity Lutheran School (Pre-K-8).

The Bay-Arenac Intermediate School District also operates a career center in the area.

=== Colleges ===
- Delta College – Located in nearby University Center, with an off-campus location in downtown Bay City
- Saginaw Valley State University – Located in nearby University Center

== Media ==
The city's main newspaper is The Bay City Times.

Bay City is also part of the Flint-Saginaw-Bay City television market, and the Saginaw-Bay City-Midland radio market.

== Infrastructure ==
=== Transportation ===
==== Major highways ====
- I-75
- BS I-75
- US 10
- US 23
- M-13
- Conn. M-13: This short freeway was once a segment of US 23. It is now a connector freeway between I-75 and M-13.
- M-15
- M-25
- M-84
- M-247

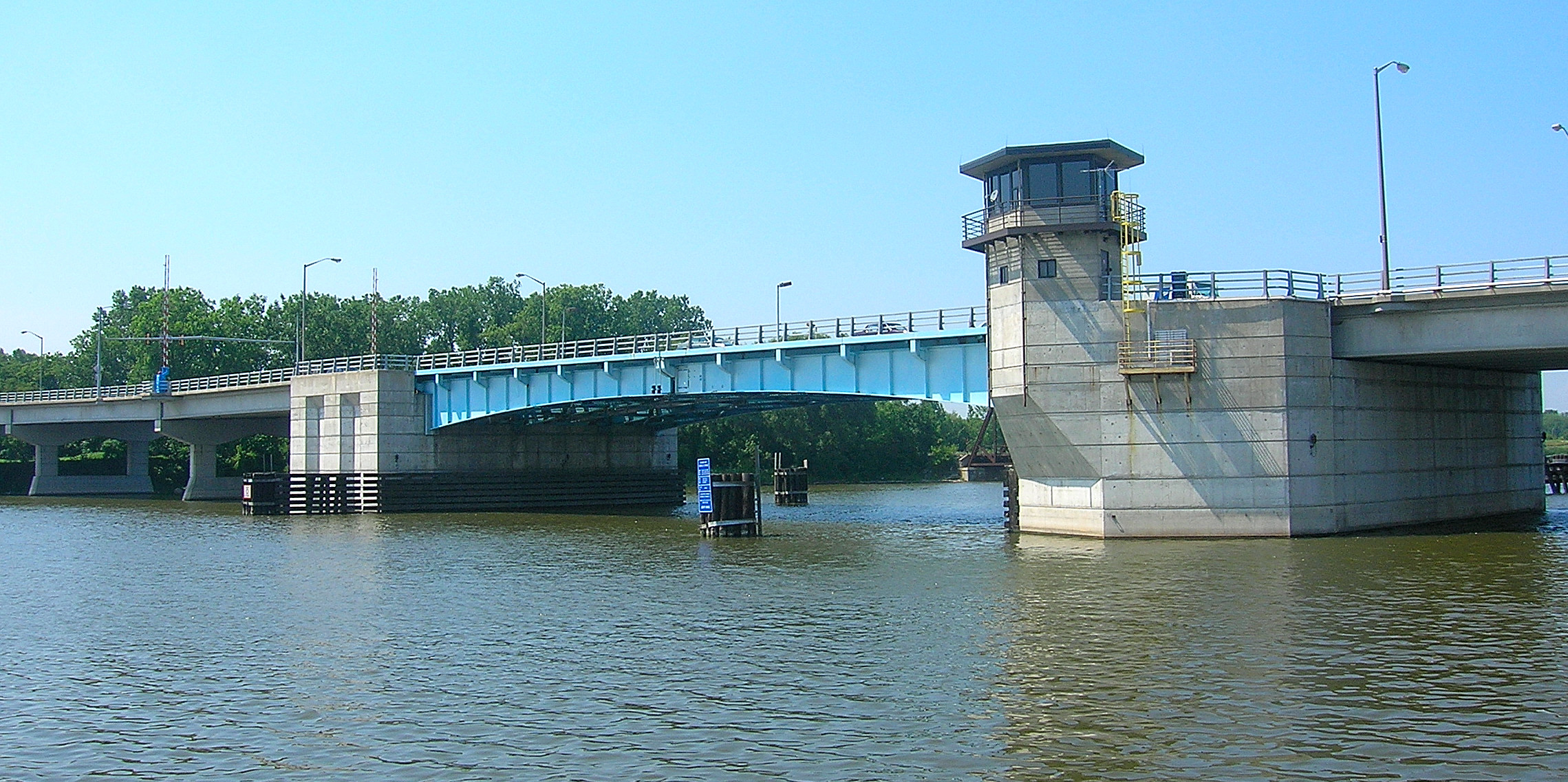
Liberty Bridge

==== Bridges ====
Four modern bascule bridges allow transportation across the Saginaw River, which separates the East and West sides of Bay City. Lafayette Avenue Bridge, opened in 1938, carries M-13 and M-84 over the river. The Veterans Memorial Bridge, opened in 1957, carries M-25 over the river. Independence Bridge, opened in 1976, carries Truman Parkway over the river, replacing the earlier Belinda Street Bridge (built in 1893). Liberty Bridge, opened in 1990, connects Vermont Street (on the west side of the river) and Woodside Avenue (on the east side).

In December 2019, the Bay City commission approved the sale of the Independence and Liberty bridges (The two bridges owned by the city, the other two being owned by the State of Michigan) to United Bridge Partners, a private company, for a total of $5 million. The sale occurred after city officials failed to reach an agreement with the Bay County or State governments concerning a sale or grant for repairs. Bay City Bridge Partners, a subsidiary of United Bridge Partners, was created to repair, refit, and administer the bridges. However, in April 2021 the City and Bay City Bridge Partners agreed to a lease based model instead of an outright sale. Construction started in December 2021 and Liberty Bridge was reopened in December 2022, with Independence bridge expected to reopen in late 2023. Tolling started on June 16, 2023, for Liberty Bridge. Many residents have expressed complaints about the sale and tolling of the bridges, citing a lack of transparency and willingness to work with other branches of government from the city.

== Notable people ==
- Madonna (1958) - singer, songwriter, actress, businesswoman, Grammy and Globe awards winner and member of Rock and Roll Hall of Fame
- Bob Allman - Chicago Bears player (1936) (Bay City Central HS)
- Emil Anneke - German Forty-Eighter and US politician
- Robert Armstrong (1890–1973) - actor, best known for starring role in King Kong
- Rolf Armstrong (1889–1960) – painter and pin-up artist
- Edmund Arnold – father of modern news design
- Warren Avis – founder of Avis Rent A Car
- Howie Auer — Philadelphia Eagles player (1933)
- James A. Barcia – U.S. Representative, state representative, and state senator.
- Gary Bautell – military radio broadcaster with the American Forces Network
- Lester O. Begick - Michigan state legislator and businessman
- James G. Birney (1792–1857) - presidential candidate 1844 and 1848 Liberty Party, a founder of Bay City
- Ruth Born (1925–2020) - All-American Girls Professional Baseball League player
- Nathan B. Bradley - first mayor of Bay City, U.S. Representative, state senator
- Betsy Brandt - actress, Breaking Bad, The Michael J. Fox Show
- William L. Clements-businessman, book collector, founder, and donor to the William L. Clements Library at the University of Michigan
- Joseph Danks - spree/serial killer
- Eric Devendorf – McDonald's All-American basketball recruit from Bay City Central HS, former starter at Syracuse University
- Mary L. Doe- (1836–1913) - suffragette
- Marie Dressler- (1868–1934) - Academy Award-winning actress lived in Bay City for a short time as a child.
- Spoke Emery – Major League Baseball player
- Eric Esch – Super Heavyweight Champion boxer, kickboxer, and martial artist
- Troy Evans (b.1977) – NFL linebacker, Houston Texans, New Orleans Saints
- John Garrels – silver and bronze Olympic medal winner
- Sanford M. Green, Michigan jurist and politician
- Ernie Gust – Major League Baseball player
- Harriet Hammond (1899–1991) - silent-film actress
- Bill Hewitt – Chicago Bears 1932–1936, Philadelphia Eagles 1937–1939, Phil-Pitt Steagles, Pro Football Hall of Fame
- George W. Hotchkiss - nineteenth century lumber dealer and journalist
- Alex Izykowski – 2006 Winter Olympics bronze medalist in short track speed skating
- Edward Jablonski (1923–2004) - author, music archivist and aviation-aerial warfare historian
- Jim Kanicki – Cleveland Browns, and New York Giants 1960–62 (Bay City Central HS)
- Thomas G. Kavanagh - Michigan Supreme Court justice
- Bruce LaFrance – Tantric musician
- Bob LaLonde - Wyoming state representative
- John List – mass murderer
- George Kid Lavigne – boxer, world lightweight champion 1896, and inductee of International Boxing Hall of Fame (1998)
- Matt Meyer, current governor of Delaware
- Jason "The Michigan Kid" Lynch – professional billiards trick-shot artist
- Terry McDermott – 500m speed skating gold medalist in Innsbruck 1964 Winter Olympics
- Kristen McDonald Rivet – U.S. representative, former state senator
- John McGraw – businessman, co-founder of Wenona, now part of Bay City, Cornell University philanthropist
- Tyler McVey (1912–2003) - actor
- Isaac Marston - Chief Justice of the Michigan Supreme Court
- Richard R. Murray - founder of Equity Schools Inc., inventor of Cristo Rey Network school model
- James Joseph Raby – Rear Admiral, USN.
- Emil F. Reinhardt (1888–1969) - Major General, US Army, commander of 69th Infantry Division during WWII; first US commander to make connection with allied Russian troops
- Trenton Robinson - safety, Michigan State football player and 2012 NFL draft pick
- Doug Sharp – 2002 Olympic bronze medal winner
- Robert Rechsteiner (Rick Steiner) and Scott Rechsteiner (Scott Steiner) – professional wrestlers
- Doug Taitt (1902–1970) - MLB outfielder
- Annie Edson Taylor – first person to go over Niagara Falls in a barrel, and live to tell the tale
- Bob Traxler – U.S. Representative, state representative
- Charles B. Warren (1870–1936) - Distinguished Service Medal recipient, U.S. Ambassador to Japan and Mexico
- Dennis Wirgowski – NFL player 1970–1973 New England Patriots and Philadelphia Eagles
- Elizebeth Thomas Werlein (1883–1946), conservationist of the French Quarter of New Orleans.
- Patrick Yandall – jazz guitarist
- Frederick Morrell Zeder – Automotive Hall of Fame member; engineer for Allis Chalmers, Willys, and Chrysler

== In popular culture ==
The Bay City Rollers, a Scottish band, were named after this city after the band randomly threw a dart at a map.

The singer Madonna, who was born in Bay City, referred to her birthplace as "a little, smelly town in Northern Michigan" for which she has had great affection on national television. Mike Buda, former Mayor in the 1990s, commented: "Madonna was absolutely right", explaining that air pollution from the gas refinery and a neighboring beet sugar plant was in fact so bad that the EPA forced the industries involved to pay a cash settlement to families, like those of Madonna's grandmother Elsie Fortin, with homes in the Banks neighborhood.

The story of Bay City's refusal to have a commemoration sign about the singer was described in a book Madonnaland (2016) by Alina Simone. The sign was subsequently posted in 2022 near her birthplace, the former Mercy Hospital, now known as Bradley House.

== Sister cities ==
Bay City has four sister cities, as designated by Sister Cities International:

- Ansbach, Bavaria, Germany
- Goderich, Ontario, Canada
- Lomé, Togo
- Poznań, Poland
