= Liberty Bridge =

Liberty Bridge may refer to:

- Ponte della Libertà in Venice
- Liberty Bridge (Bay City, Michigan)
- Liberty Bridge (Budapest)
- Liberty Bridge at Falls Park on the Reedy in Greenville, South Carolina
- Liberty Bridge (Novi Sad)
- Liberty Bridge (Pittsburgh)
- Liberty Bridge (Skopje)
- Liberty Bridge, Zagreb, the first divided highway bridge in Zagreb, Croatia
- The original proposal for the Verrazzano–Narrows Bridge in New York City, referred to as the "Liberty Bridge"
