= Lafayette Avenue Bridge =

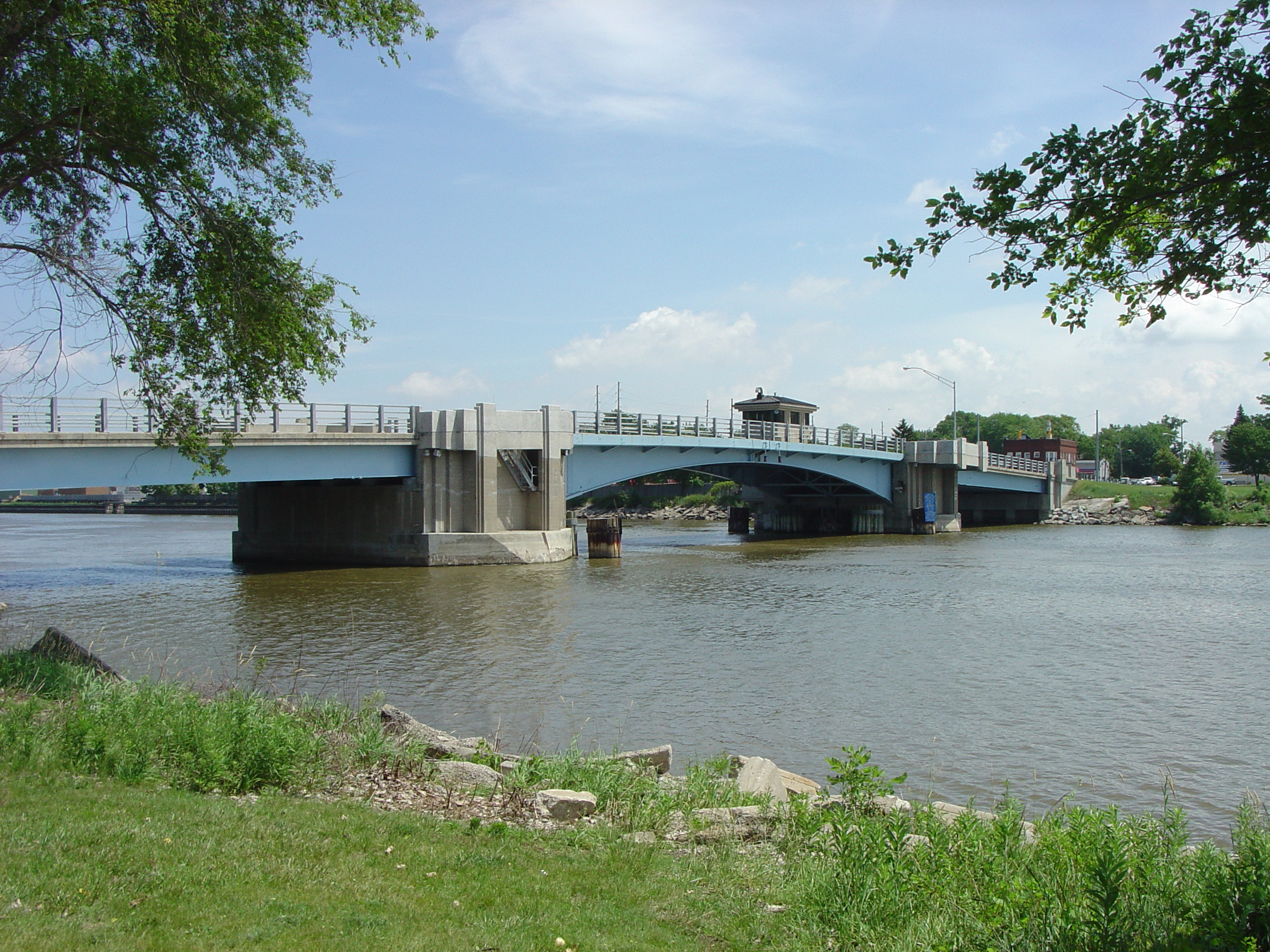
- The East Bridge (The Drawbridge)
- Coordinates: 43.5797°N 83.90°W
- Carries: M-13 / M-84
- Crosses: Saginaw River
- Locale: Bay City, Michigan
- Official name: Lafayette Avenue Bridge
- Maintained by: Michigan Department of Transportation

Characteristics
- Design: Girder Bridge (West Bridge); Bascule bridge (East Bridge)
- Total length: 310 ft (94 m)

History
- Opened: 1938

Statistics
- Toll: None
- Bay City Bascule Bridge
- Formerly listed on the U.S. National Register of Historic Places
- Location within Michigan Location within the United States
- Architect: Michigan State Highway Department
- NRHP reference No.: 99001465

Significant dates
- Added to NRHP: November 30, 1999
- Removed from NRHP: April 20, 2015

Location
- Interactive map of Lafayette Avenue Bridge

The Lafayette Avenue Bridge, formerly listed on the National Register of Historic Places as the Bay City Bascule Bridge, is the name given to two separate bridges located in Bay City, Michigan. The bridges carry M-13 and M-84 over the Saginaw River. They are maintained by the Michigan Department of Transportation, and the bascule portion is currently the oldest of Bay City's four modern drawbridges. It was listed on the National Register of Historic Places on November 30, 1999, but was removed from the Register in 2015.

== Description ==
Heading east, the West Channel bridge is a fixed metal continuous deck stringer (Multi-Beam) bridge carrying M-13/M-84 from the western shore of the river to Middle Ground Island. The East Channel bridge is a small drawbridge carrying the road from the island to the eastern shore of the river. M-13/M-84 is known as Salzburg Avenue on the west side of the river, and Lafayette Avenue on the east, which is where the bridge's name comes from. The entire structure is 452 feet long, with a bascule span of 185 feet. When the bascule is raised the bridge provides a 150-foot horizontal clearance. Sidewalks of five feet width run down each side. The bridge also has four observation platforms and a bridge tender's house.

== History ==
The Lafayette Avenue Bridge replaced an earlier bridge built at the same location in 1876. This bridge was condemned in 1934, and a temporary pontoon swing bridge was immediately installed at the site. The City of Bay City began surveying the condition of its bridges in 1936 and developed a plan to replace the Lafayette Avenue Bridge and rehabilitate the Belinda Street and Cass Avenue Bridges. However, funding was scarce as the country was in the midst of the Great Depression, though funding would eventually come through the Public Works Administration, part of President Franklin D. Roosevelt's New Deal. The current Lafayette Avenue Bridge was completed and opened in 1938. It became the city's southernmost bridge over the Saginaw River in 1955 after the removal of the Cass Avenue Bridge.

The bridge was extensively rehabilitated in 1987, but still functions in place as originally constructed. The 1987 rehabilitation replaced nearly all the superstructure, substituting welded girders for the original riveted ones. Another extensive rehabilitation project is planned to Start in November 2024 That will Cost Michigan Department of Transportation 112 million and will be closed for 2 1/2 years, and will be reopened in June 2027.

== Gallery ==
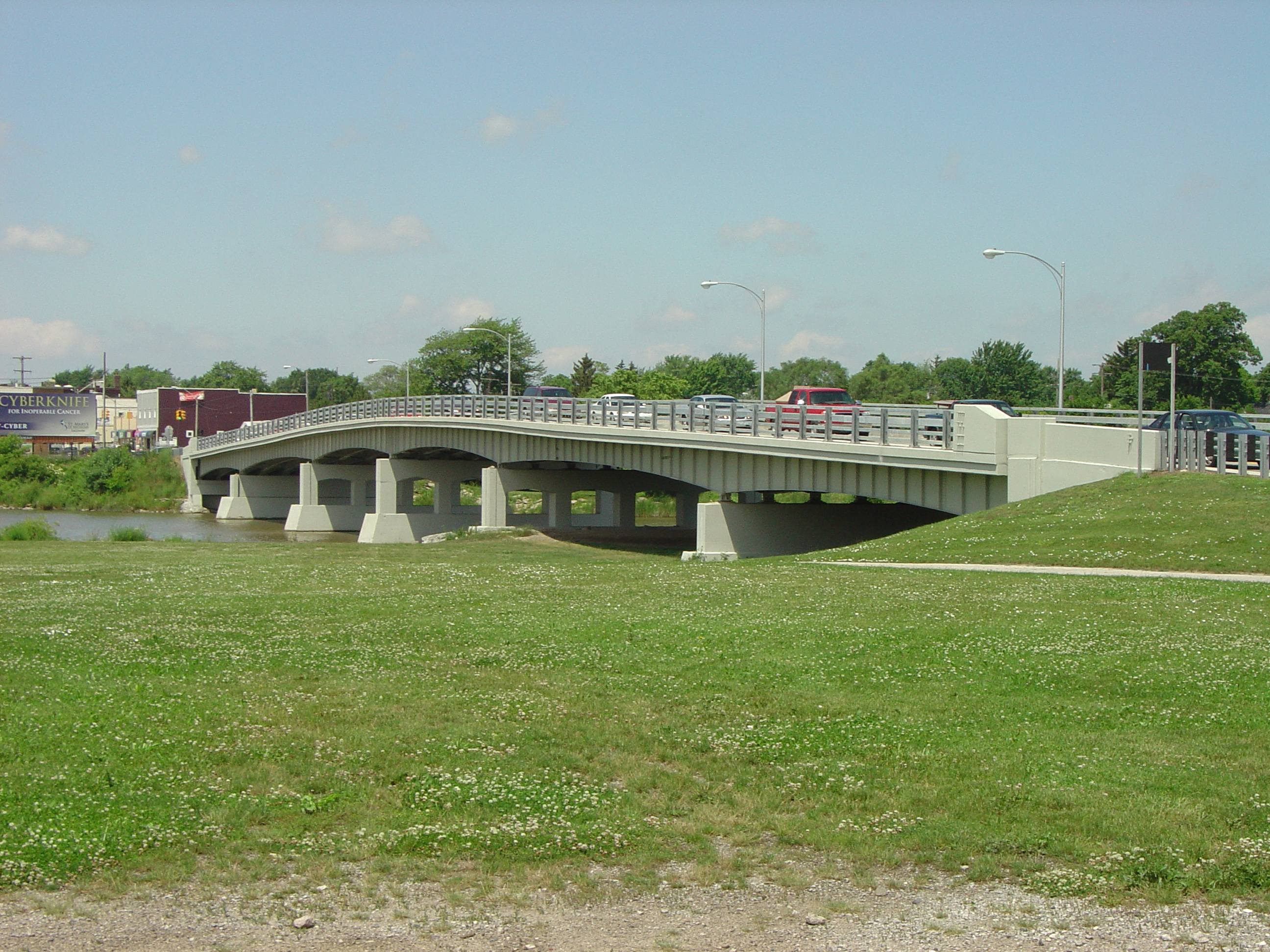
The West Bridge

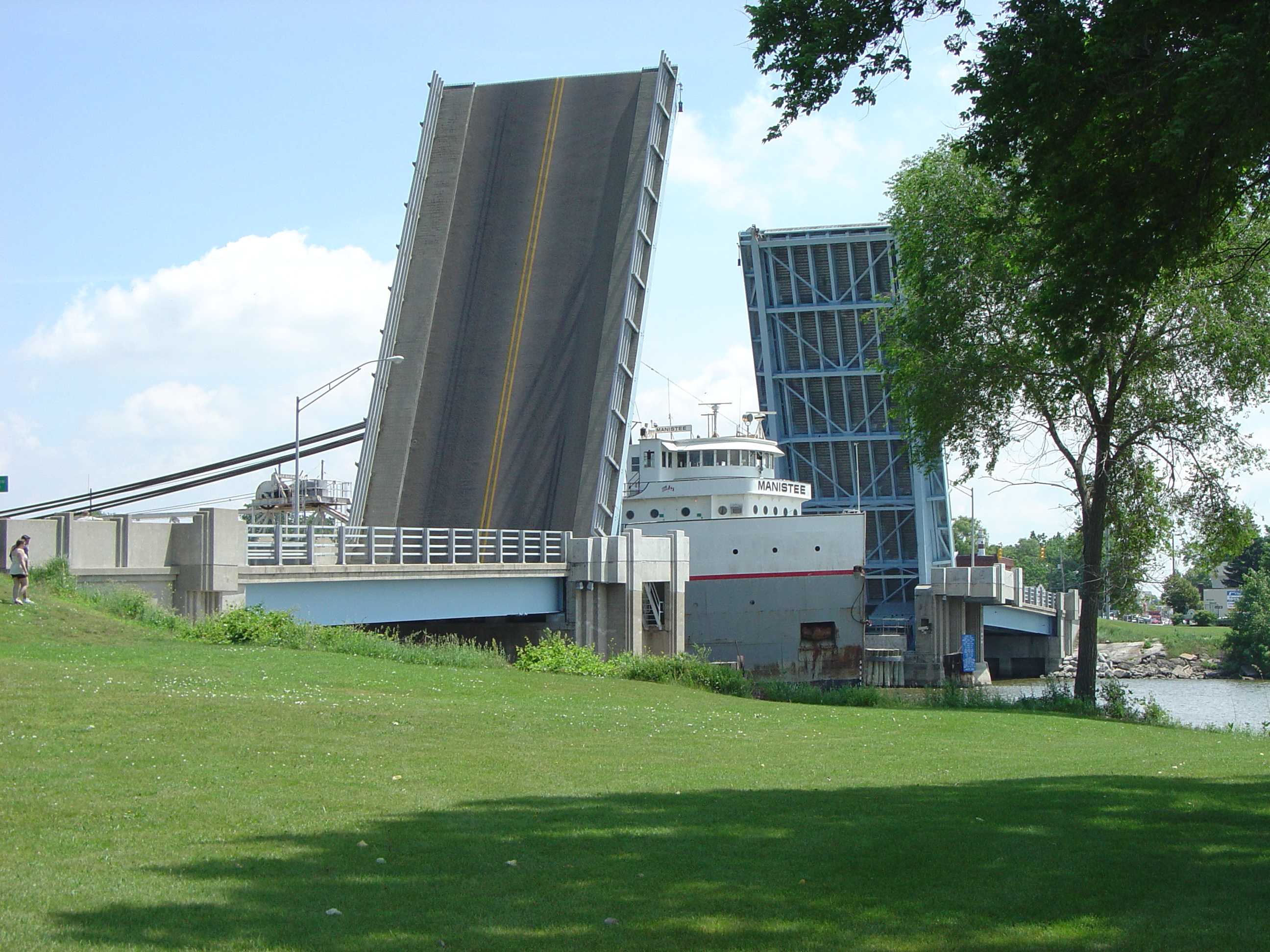
The drawbridge with a freighter passing underneath

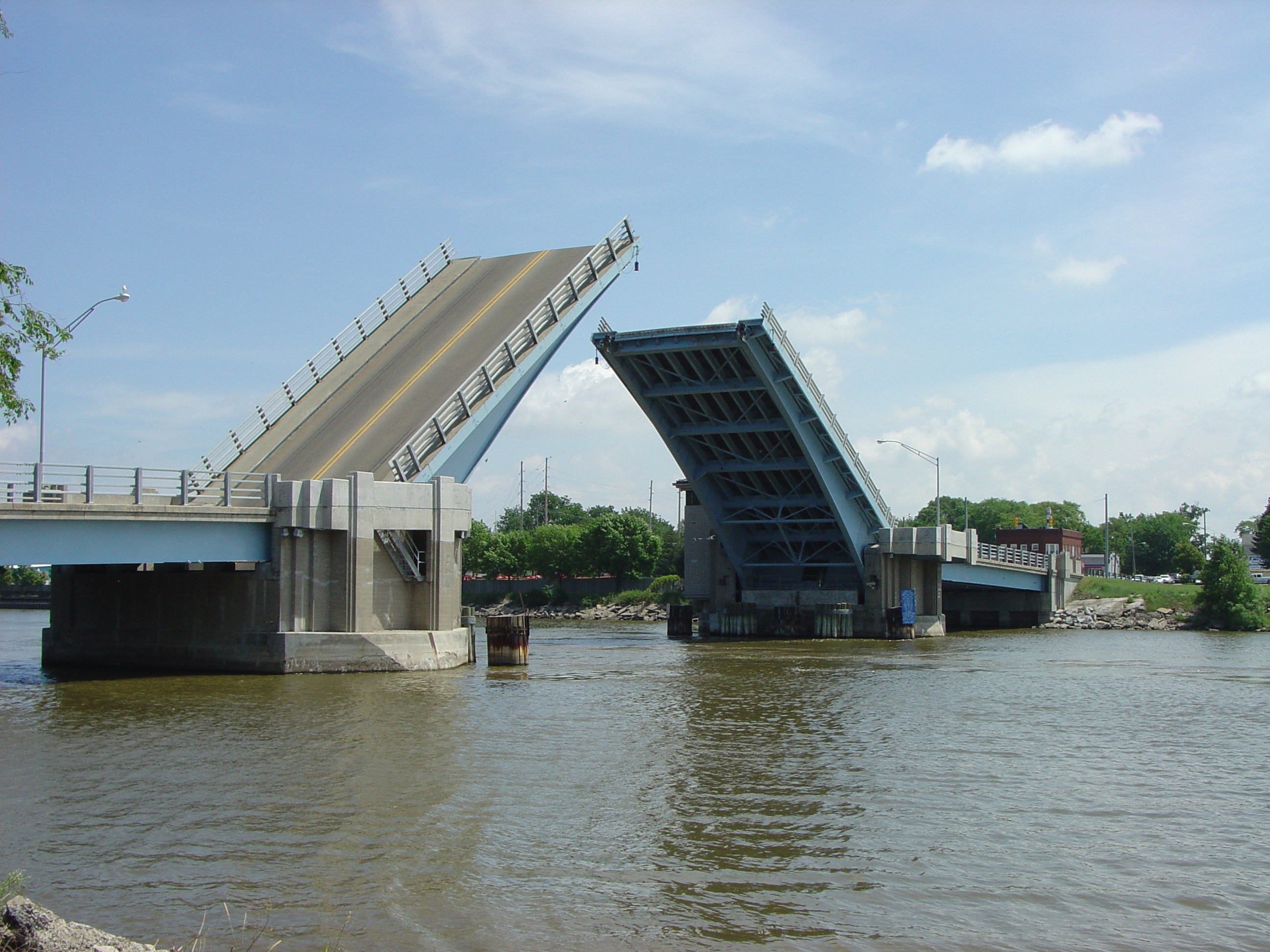
The drawbridge with the bascule spans partially open

== See also ==
- List of bridges on the National Register of Historic Places in Michigan
- National Register of Historic Places listings in Bay County, Michigan
