= USS Edson =

Forrest Sherman-class destroyer

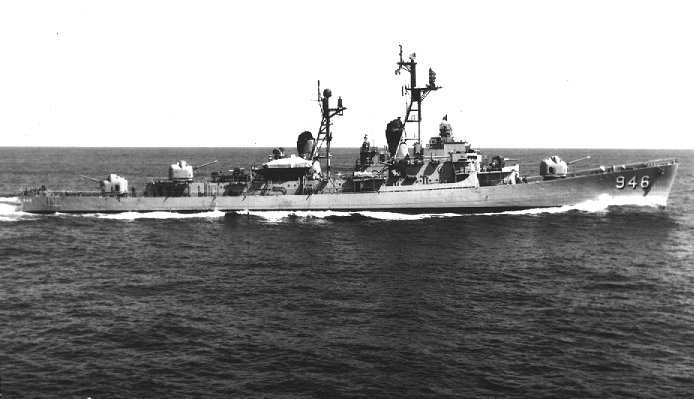
- USS Edson (DD-946)

History

United States
- Name: Edson
- Namesake: Merritt A. Edson
- Awarded: 27 January 1956
- Builder: Bath Iron Works, Bath ME
- Laid down: 3 December 1956
- Launched: 4 January 1958
- Sponsored by: Mrs. M. A. Edson (widow)
- Acquired: 31 October 1958
- Commissioned: 7 November 1958
- Decommissioned: 15 December 1988
- Stricken: 31 January 1989
- Home port: Long Beach, California, Newport, Rhode Island (1977-1988)
- Identification: NJRE (radio call sign)
- Nickname(s): "Fast Eddie", "The Grey Ghost of the Vietnamese Coast"
- Honors and awards: Armed Forces Expeditionary Medal, Navy Unit Commendation, Vietnam Service Medal, National Defense Medal, Combat Action Medal, Meritorious Unit Commendation, Coast Guard Meritorious Unit Commendation (with Operational "O" device)
- Status: Museum ship at Saginaw Valley Naval Ship Museum, Bay City, Michigan since 2013

General characteristics
- Class & type: Forrest Sherman-class destroyer
- Displacement: 2,800 tons standard.; 4,050 tons full load
- Length: 407 ft (124 m) waterline, 418 ft (127 m) overall.
- Beam: 45 ft (14 m)
- Draft: 22 ft (6.7 m)
- Propulsion: 4 × 1,200 psi (8.3 MPa) Babcock & Wilcox boilers, Worthington steam turbines; 70,000 shp (52,000 kW); 2 × shafts.
- Speed: 32.5 knots (60.2 km/h; 37.4 mph)
- Range: 4,500 nmi (8,300 km; 5,200 mi) at 20 knots (37 km/h; 23 mph)
- Complement: 17 officers, 218 enlisted
- Armament: 3 × 5 in (127 mm)/54 calibre dual purpose Mk 42 guns; (3x1); 4 × 3 in (76 mm)/50 calibre Mark 33 anti-aircraft guns (2x2); 2 × mark 10/11 Hedgehogs; 6 × 12.75 in (324 mm) Mark 32 torpedo tubes
- USS Edson
- U.S. National Register of Historic Places
- U.S. National Historic Landmark
- New York State Register of Historic Places
- Location: Bay City, Michigan
- NRHP reference No.: 90000333
- NYSRHP No.: 06101.001485

Significant dates
- Added to NRHP: 21 June 1990
- Designated NHL: 21 June 1990
- Designated NYSRHP: 11 June 1990

USS Edson (DD-946) is a Forrest Sherman-class destroyer, formerly of the United States Navy, built by Bath Iron Works in Maine in 1958. Her home port was Long Beach, California, and she initially served in the Western Pacific/Far East, operating particularly in the Taiwan Strait and off the coast of Vietnam. Her exceptionally meritorious service in 1964 in the Gulf of Tonkin was recognized with the first of three Navy Unit Commendations. During the following years she was shelled by North Vietnamese land forces, and apparently received friendly fire from the US Air Force.

Following an onboard fire in 1974, Edson returned to the West Pacific and was later commended for her roles in the evacuation of Phnom Penh and Saigon.

She was decommissioned in 1988, but the following year became a museum ship at the Intrepid Sea-Air-Space Museum in New York. Returning to Navy lay-up in 2004, it was agreed in 2012 that she should again become a museum ship, this time in Bay City, Michigan. A National Historic Landmark, she is one of only two surviving Forrest Sherman-class destroyers, the other being the USS Turner Joy.

== Commissioning and initial service ==
USS Edson was named for Major General Merritt "Red Mike" Edson USMC (1897–1955), who was awarded the Medal of Honor (while serving as commanding officer of the First Marine Raider Battalion on Guadalcanal) and the Navy Cross and Silver Star for other actions in World War II.

Edson was laid down on 3 December 1956 by Bath Iron Works Corporation and launched on 4 January 1958, sponsored by Mrs. M. A. Edson, widow of General Edson; and commissioned on 7 November 1958.

Edson called at Ciudad Trujillo and Caribbean ports while conducting shakedown training en route to Callao, Peru, where she lay from 18 to 21 February 1959 delivering supplies for the U.S. Embassy in Lima, Peru. She reached Naval Station Long Beach, California, her home port, on 2 March, and through the remainder of the year perfected her readiness with exercises along the west coast. On 5 January 1960, she sailed from Long Beach for her first deployment in the Far East, during which she patrolled in the Taiwan Straits and took part in amphibious operations off Okinawa, and exercises of various types off Japan. On 29 April, she rescued three aviators from USS Ranger, whose A-3D aircraft had ditched in the ocean. Edson returned to Long Beach on 31 May for an overhaul which continued through October. Edson spent the remainder of 1960 conducting training off San Diego.

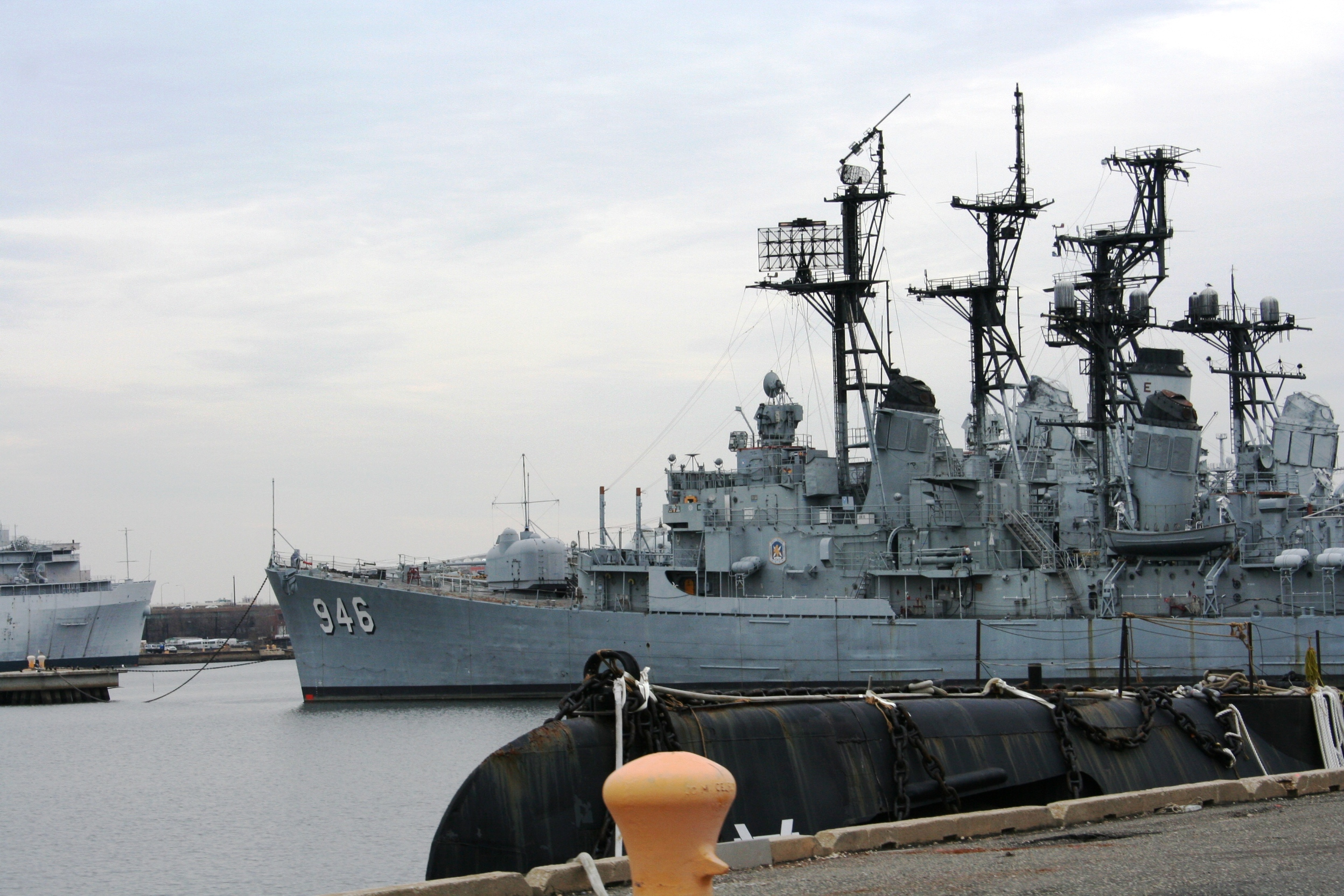
The bow of USS Edson at Philadelphia Naval Shipyard

== WESTPAC deployments ==
In June 1961 Edson, together with the other ships of DESDIV 231, sailed to Portland, Oregon, to represent the U.S. Navy at the annual Rose Festival. On 11 August 1961, Edson sailed from Long Beach harbor to start her second WESTPAC deployment. She spent three months in operations with the attack carriers USS Ranger and USS Ticonderoga and spent the month of December patrolling the straits between Taiwan and the mainland of Communist China.

On Friday, 13 March 1964, Edson departed for her third WESTPAC deployment. After the transit, Edson began duties with the Taiwan Patrol Force, CTF 72. The end of May and the months of June and July 1964 were filled with carrier operations, Gunfire Support Training in the Philippines, and operation LICTAS, a joint SEATO operation off the coast of the Philippines. August found Edson in the Gulf of Tonkin on special operations. It was here she was awarded the Navy Unit Commendation for exceptionally meritorious service in support of operations in the Gulf of Tonkin during the period 2–5 August 1964. On her fifth deployment in 1967, she received a hit from a North Vietnamese shore battery while providing a naval gunfire support mission.

Edson served as plane guard for aircraft carriers on Yankee Station in the Tonkin Gulf, participated in Sea Dragon operations, patrolled on search and rescue duties, and carried out Naval Gunfire Support missions during the Vietnam War. On 17 June 1968 she apparently took friendly fire from the US Air Force, along with several other U.S. and Australian ships.

On 12 December 1974, Edson suffered a fire in the after fireroom while training with USS Coral Sea. The fire was caused by the ignition of oil which was spraying from a rupture in a lube oil gauge line. The area was secured and fire extinguished with no personnel casualties.

In January 1975, after repairs in Hawaii, Edson continued on to WESTPAC and in April she participated in Operation Eagle Pull (evacuation of Phnom Penh, Cambodia) and Operation Frequent Wind (evacuation of Saigon, Vietnam), earning two Meritorious Unit Commendations.

Edson was decommissioned on 15 December 1988, and towed to the Philadelphia Inactive Ships Maintenance Facility for storage. At the time of her decommissioning, she was the last all-gun destroyer in the United States Navy.

== Museum ==
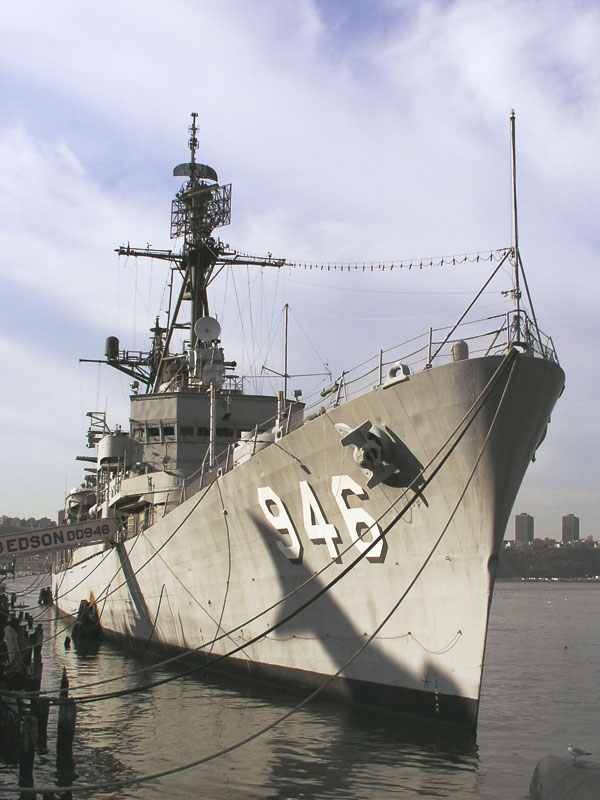
USS Edson in 2003

Edson served as a museum ship at the Intrepid Sea-Air-Space Museum in New York City from 30 June 1989 to 14 June 2004 when she was replaced by a Concorde airliner. The ship was declared a National Historic Landmark in 1990.

In 2004 the ship was towed to the Brooklyn Navy Yard, where hull repairs were completed, and then towed back to the Philadelphia Inactive Ships Maintenance Facility for storage. The Saginaw Valley Naval Ship Museum at Bay City, Michigan, and the Wisconsin Naval Ship Association at Sheboygan, Wisconsin, both submitted applications to the Naval Sea Systems Command to relocate Edson and reinstate her as a museum ship in their respective locations. The Bay City proposal was successful.

The Navy declared USS Edson seaworthy on 17 July 2012 and she was cleared to begin her journey to Michigan on 18 July with arrival at the museum site on 7 August 2012. After roughly a year at a temporary mooring at Wirt Stone docks, she was floated up the Saginaw river to her permanent mooring site, and on Tuesday, 7 May 2013 at 15:01 hours, USS Edson arrived at her permanent mooring site in Bangor Township, Michigan, at 43°36′50″N 83°52′8″W.

== See also ==
- List of National Historic Landmarks in Michigan
- National Register of Historic Places listings in Bay County, Michigan
- The Twilight Zone (1959 TV series) episode "The Thirty-Fathom Grave" in which the ship makes appearances
