= Bay City Downtown Historic District =

- U.S. National Register of Historic Places
- U.S. Historic district
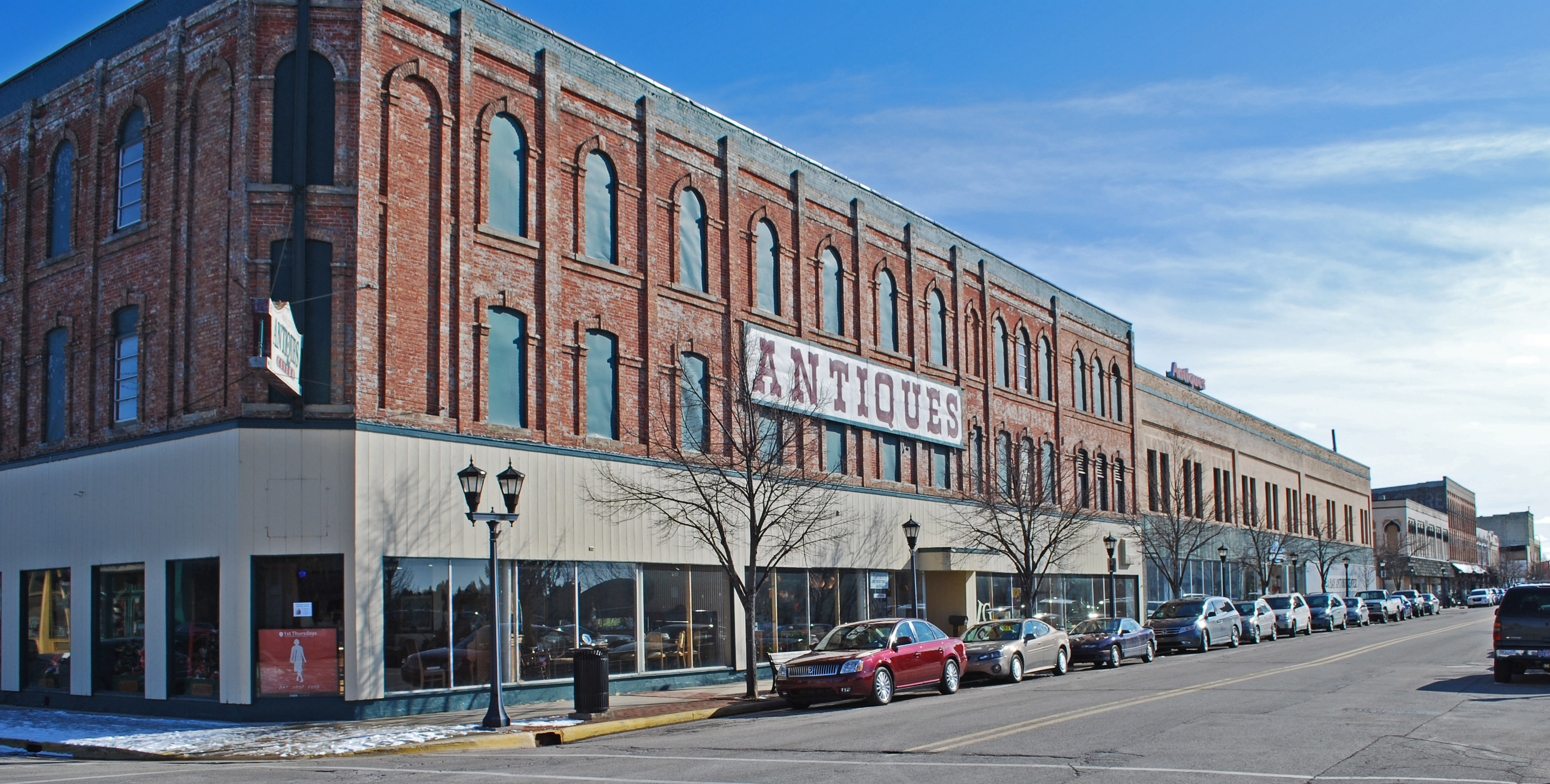
- Water and Third Street

- Location within Michigan Location within the United States
- Interactive map
- Location: Roughly bounded by Saginaw River, Second and Adam Sts. and Center Ave., Bay City, Michigan
- Coordinates: 43°36′0″N 83°53′18″W
- Area: 39 acres (16 ha)
- Built: 1865
- Architect: Albert Kahn, et al.
- Architectural style: Colonial Revival, Italianate, Romanesque
- NRHP reference No.: 85002338
- Added to NRHP: September 12, 1985

The Bay City Downtown Historic District is a primarily commercial historic district, located in Bay City, Michigan and roughly bounded by the Saginaw River, Second Street, Adam Street, and Center Avenue. It was listed on the National Register of Historic Places in 1985.

== History ==
Bay City was founded in the mid-1840s, and the first commercial establishment began admitting customers in 1850-51. The initial commercial development in Bay City, in the 1850s and 1860s, occurred along North Water Street, adjacent to the lumbering businesses along the river. Third Street, linked to West Bay City via a bridge over the river, also became an important commercial artery, as did Center Avenue. The first brick building was constructed in 1862, and fire regulations put in place after a disastrous 1865 fire ensured further buildings would be brick.

The streets were paved in the 1870s and 1880s, at the same time that the city was exploding in size, with over 25,000 residents in 1884. As the city and the commercial district grew, development shifted east to Washington. New construction continued through World War I, and additional construction was implemented even later.

== Description ==
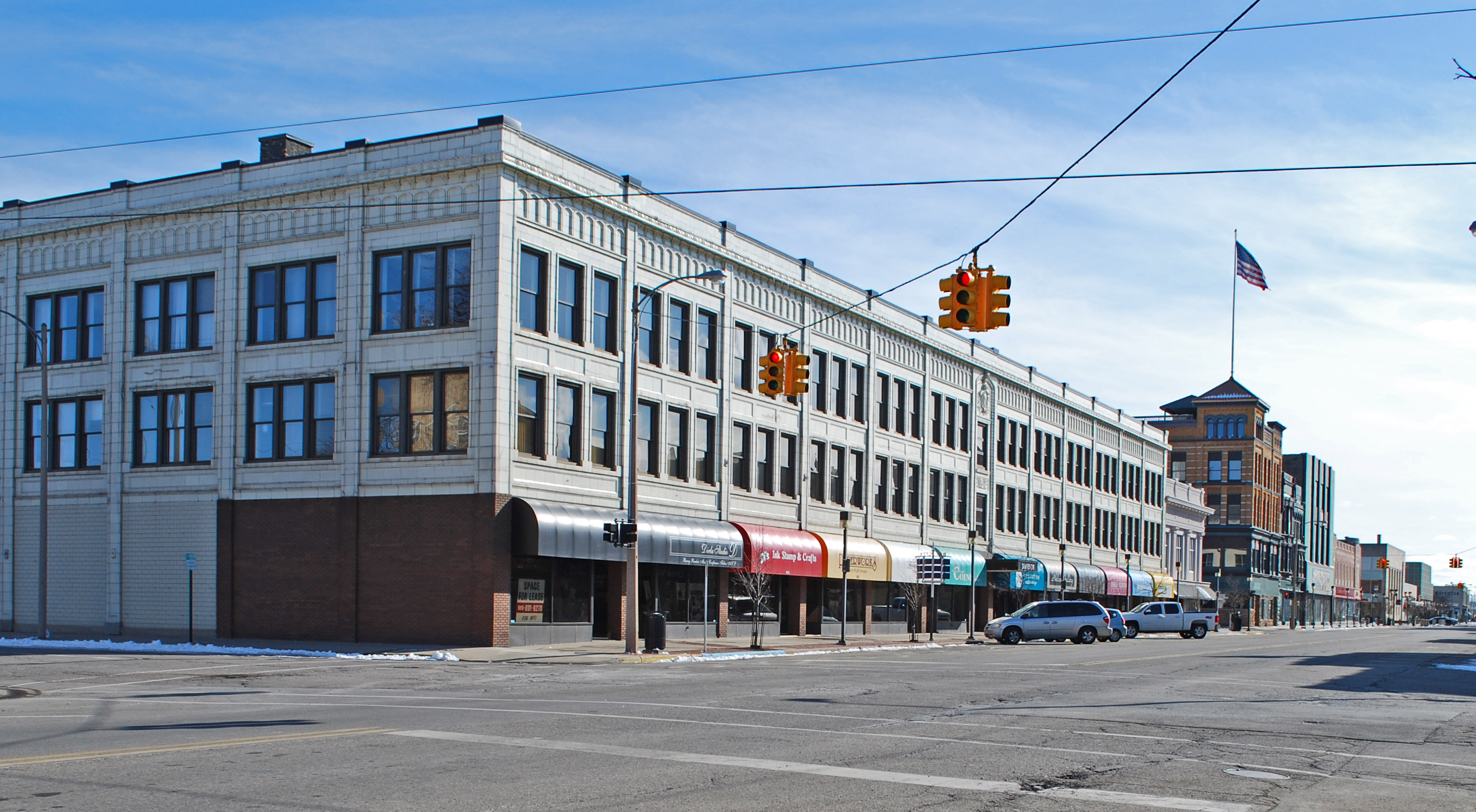
Washington and Fourth

The Bay City Downtown Historic District consists of 91 structures: 90 of which are commercial, and one government building. Sixty-seven of the buildings contribute to the historic character of the district. The district occupies about 16-1/2 square blocks in the northwest portion of Bay City's downtown. The structures in the district date from the Civil War through the early 1930s, and include a variety of styles, from Italianate Commercial Palaces to Romanesque commercial blocks, early 1900s Colonial Revival buildings and Modern designs.

Some of the most significant structures in the district include:

- Jennison Hardware Company, 901 North Water Street. A complex of three masonry buildings, including a five-story retail/warehouse facility designed in 1924 by Albert Kahn, a two-story office-block constructed ed in 1913, and a two-story trapezoidal-shaped warehouse constructed in 1921.
- Denison Block/Alert Pipe & Supply, 1001 North Water Street. A two-story brick commercial block erected in 1882–83 by E.B. Denison.
- Phoenix Block, 717–723 Washington Avenue. A four-story Romanesque Revival building constructed in 1886–87.
- Ueberroth Block, 816 Washington Avenue. A three-story masonry commercial block erected by Chris H. Ueberroth, a dealer in crockery, glassware, and china, in about 1890.
- Scheurmann Block, 818 Washington Avenue. A three-story masonry Romanesque Revival commercial building designed in 1891 by Pratt & Koeppe and constructed for Richard Scheurmann.
- C.E. Rosenbury & Sons, 822 Washington Avenue. A four-and-one-half-story Romanesque Revival commercial block designed by Pratt & Koeppe
- Davidson Building, 916 Washington Avenue. A three-story masonry commercial block built c. 1915.
- Herman Hiss & Company, 905 Washington Avenue. A two-story masonry commercial building with a Modernistic design with zig-zag ornamentation.
- United States Post Office, Court House and Custom House, 1000 Washington Avenue. A monumental rectangular three-story masonry building constructed in 1931–32.
- The Bay City Times Building, 311 Fifth Street. A two-story masonry commercial structure erected in 1907–08 and designed by Albert Kahn.
- First Shearer Block/McCormick Block, 101–107 Center Avenue. This three-story building, built in 1866, was the first three-story business block constructed in Bay City.
- Simmons Jewelers, 208 Center Avenue. A "Commercial Palace" structure erected in the late 1870s or early 1880s.
- Griswold/Bijou Block, 210 Center Avenue. A three-story masonry commercial building constructed in 1888.
- Shearer Block, 311–319 Center Avenue. A four-story masonry commercial block.
- Bromfield & Colvin Grain Elevator, 1022 Adams Street.
- Bromfield & Colvin Grain Warehouse, 1018 Adams Street. A four-story masonry warehouse erected in the later 1880s.
