= Saginaw Valley Naval Ship Museum =

- Established: 2012
- Location: 1680 Martin St Bay City, MI 48706 United States
- Coordinates: 43°36′50″N 83°52′8″W
- Type: American history
- Director: Michael J. Kegley
- Public transit access: Bay Metro
- Website: www.ussedson.org

The Saginaw Valley Naval Ship Museum is dedicated to honoring veterans, documenting United States Navy history, and highlighting the Great Lakes Bay Region. The museum is permanently housed in the USS Edson, a retired United States Navy destroyer. The museum is located in Bay City, Michigan, United States. Those responsible for this destroyer being brought to Bay City and opened as a museum are Mike Kegley, Richard Janke, Mary Kegley, and Mark Janke. This destroyer will be the main element for the museum as it has plans to expand into other exhibits in the years to come.

== History ==
=== Ship's background ===
The retired US Naval warship USS Edson was put into commission on November 7, 1958. The destroyer remained in commission for 30 years and was decommissioned on December 15, 1988. The USS Edson was built by Bath Iron Works in Bath, Maine, and then named after Major General Merritt Austin Edson. The ship was crewed by 17 officers and 276 crew members. During its commission, it fired the most five-inch shells of any destroyer. This "fire first, ask questions later" policy earned the USS Edson the motto of “Three Guns, No Waiting”. The ship is a 418 foot (127 m) longdestroyer powered by four 1,200-pound-per-square-inch (8.3×10^{9} mPa) boilers feeding two steam turbines. Though this ship is known greatly for its forceful firing, it had only seen time in two major wars. The USS Edson was a part of both the Vietnam War and the Cold War.

=== Ship's journey ===
The United States Navy cleared the USS Edson on April 24, 2012, to become a part of the Saginaw Valley Naval Ship Museum. It took years for the museum to be approved to obtain a retired destroyer but Mike Kegly did not give up and continued to be persistent on being in touch with the Navy. Since the ship was given approval to be a part of the museum, the museum had 50 days to come pick up the destroyer because it was the new owners' responsibility to obtain the ship after its release. The museum was forced to wait in order to obtain a quote on how much it would cost them to get two tug boats to aid in the delivery of the USS Edson from the Philadelphia Naval Shipyard to the museum located in Bangor Township. The USS Edson was towed more than 2,000 miles (3,200 km) from a shipping yard located in Philadelphia to its new more permanent home as a museum in Bay City. However, there was one major issue that faced the museum before they could take destroyer from its home in Philadelphia and that was with the boat's propeller guards. The propeller guards are featured on every ship to protect tug boats from running into the ships' propellers. This concern about the propellers became a problem for the USS Edson when it was passing through the locks near Canada because the Canadian Authorities were concerned that the guards could damage the locks as the ship passed through. After a long discussion and explanation on why the propeller guards had to stay Canadian Authorities cleared the destroyer to continue on with its voyage. Its permanent location within Bay City is at the Independence Park Boat Launch right next to the Independence Bridge located in Bangor Township.

== Location ==
The Saginaw Valley Naval Ship Museum is located in Bangor Township, and is open to everyone who wants to partake in the activities that the museum provides. The ship was released to the museum on April 24, 2012 and left for Bay City on July 18, 2012. It was expected that the ship would arrive, to its location on the Saginaw River on August 3, 2012, but some intense winds delayed the arrival until August 5, 2012. The USS Edson is docked permanently as a floating museum and is open for tours. The USS Edson is the centerpiece for the Saginaw Valley Naval Ship Museum as it is located in the Saginaw River.

== Volunteers ==
The Saginaw Valley Naval Ship Museum was able to obtain this Navy destroyer because of the vast amount of volunteer work put in by the board members and many outside volunteers as well. A permanent dock was built for the museum. About 140 US gallons (530 L; 120 imp gal) of paint in two different shades of gray were ordered for the painting of the dock.
