= Independence Bridge =

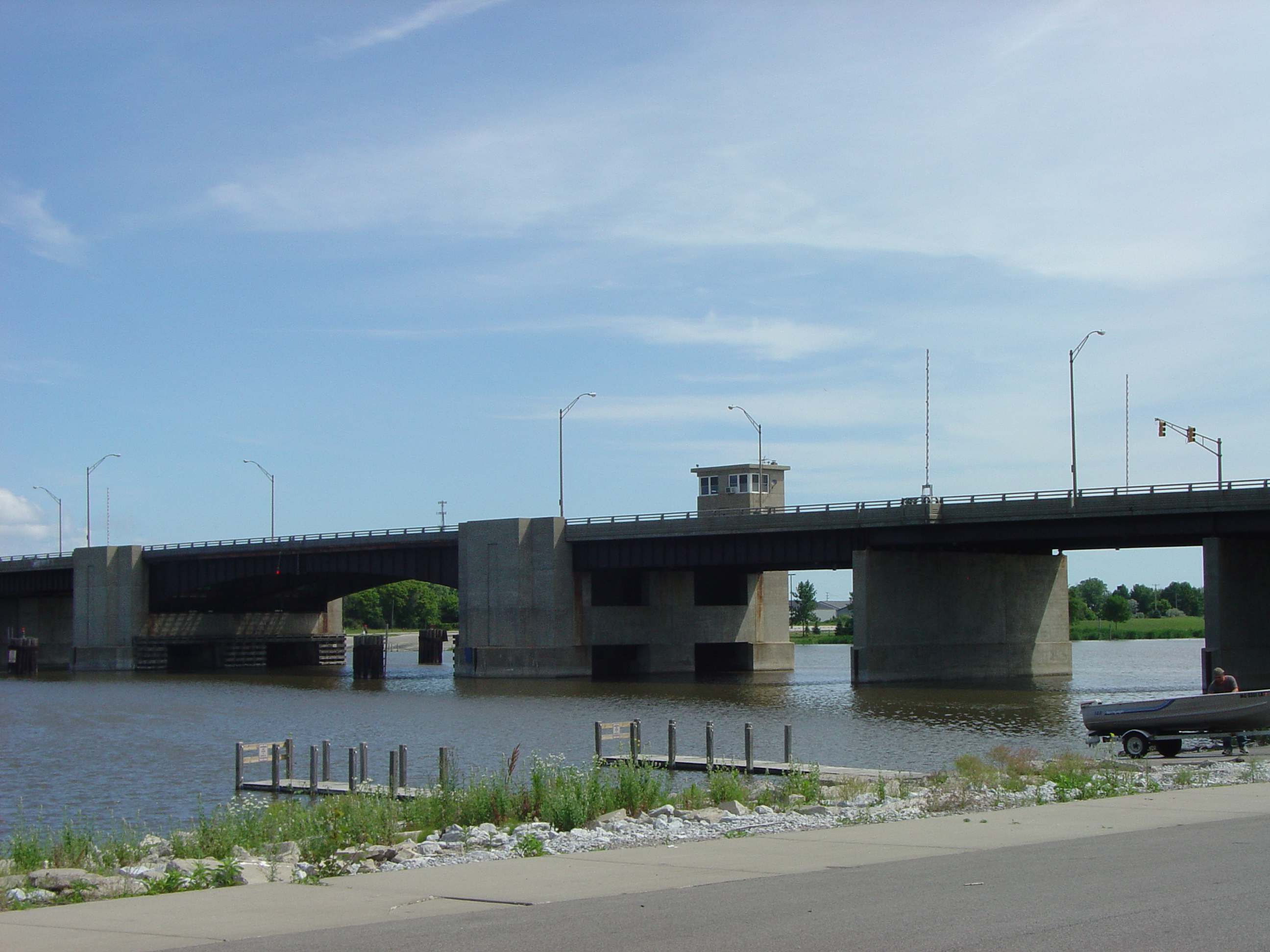
- Coordinates: 43.6131°N 83.8727°W
- Crosses: Saginaw River
- Locale: Bay City, Michigan
- Official name: Independence Bridge
- Maintained by: Bay City Bridge Partners

Characteristics
- Design: Bascule bridge

History
- Opened: 1976

Statistics
- Toll: $5.50 / $2.00

The Independence Bridge is a bascule-type drawbridge located in Bay City, Michigan. It carries Truman Parkway over the Saginaw River and was opened in 1976 to replace the earlier Belinda Street Bridge (built in 1893) Starting January 1, 2025, an electronic toll is charged to motorists either through their BC-Pass, E-ZPass transponder, or via license plate photo.
