= Edmund Arnold =

American newspaper designer (1913–2007)

Edmund C. Arnold
- Born: June 25, 1913; Bay City, Michigan
- Died: February 2, 2007 (aged 93); Roanoke, Virginia
- Occupation: Newspaper designer

Edmund C. Arnold (June 25, 1913 – February 2, 2007) was a newspaper designer, considered by many to be the father of modern newspaper design. As a newspaper consultant, he designed more than a thousand newspapers including The Boston Globe, National Observer, Today, Toronto Star, The Kansas City Star, and many small weeklies. He also worked as the editor of The Linotype News, and as a columnist for Publisher's Auxiliary.

== Early life ==
Arnold was born on June 25, 1913, in Bay City, Michigan, the son of Ferdinand M. and Anna I. (Begick) Arnold. As a small boy the family moved to Saginaw, Michigan. Edmund's only brother, Robert, drowned in the Saginaw Bay in a boating accident in 1938 at the age of 19.

== Career ==
When World War II broke out, Arnold became an editor for the 70th Infantry Division's newspaper. After the war, he became a co-owner of the Michigan-based Frankenmuth News during which time his typography interest kicked in. Later on, Arnold became a picture editor of The Saginaw News. In 1954 he moved to New York City where he became an editor of popular Linotype News, an imprint of the Mergenthaler Linotype Company. Later on, he spent 44 years of his life as a newspaper design advocate columnist in a weekly trade journal, The Publishers' Auxiliary which always ended with "Arnold's Ancient Axiom". He also redid The Boston Globe to make a number one newspaper again.

In 1960, Arnold became a professor at the S. I. Newhouse School of Public Communications of the Syracuse University and in 1975 was named the head of the graphic arts department at Virginia Commonwealth University. Despite his retirement from the editing position in 1983, he continued to consult and conduct workshops.

He was a charter member of the Society for News Design and an author of 27 books, including the Ink on Paper (1963), Ink on Paper 2 (1972), and Modern Newspaper Design (1969).

== Retirement and death ==
In 1983 he retired from Syracuse University but still continued to consult and conduct workshops. On February 2, 2007, Arnold died in Salem, VA. The cause of death was reported as Respiratory Disease NYTimes.com.

== Awards ==
In 1957 Arnold, for his contribution to American journalism through typographical design was a recipient of the George Polk Memorial Award. He also was honored with SND's lifetime achievement award in 2000 from the American Press Institute. When describing the state of news design in an interview at the time he was honored, Arnold said:

I want to put on record that I'm not an old reprobate longing for a return of the good old days. I'm more of an old father who is disappointed that his kids are only reaching 98 percent of their potential and wants them to reach 101 percent. My message to young designers is this: Look kids, you can do better, but the only way to achieve your potential is to go back to - and understand - the basics. That sounds boring, but it's reality.

The seminal work on the Gutenberg diagram (Z pattern layout) is attributed to the typographer Edmund Arnold, who is said to have developed the concept in the 1950s.
