= M-84 (Michigan highway) =

State highway in Saginaw and Bay counties in Michigan, United States

M-84
- M-84 highlighted in red

Route information
- Maintained by MDOT
- Length: 14.710 mi (23.673 km)
- Existed: 1960–present

Major junctions
- South end: M-58 in Saginaw
- I-75 / US 23 near Bay City
- North end: M-25 in Bay City

Location
- Country: United States
- State: Michigan
- Counties: Saginaw, Bay

Highway system
- Michigan State Trunkline Highway System; Interstate; US; State; Byways
← M-83	→ M-85

M-84 is a north–south state trunkline highway in the Lower Peninsula of the US state of Michigan. The highway starts on the west side of Saginaw at an intersection with M-58 and runs north through residential and commercial areas. There are two colleges or universities near the trunkline as it connects Saginaw with Bay City, providing an alternative to the freeway that carries Interstate 75/US Highway 23 (I-75/US 23). The northern terminus is at a pair of intersections with M-25 on the east side of the Saginaw River in Bay City.

There have been two other highways to bear the M-84 moniker. The first was one in the Upper Peninsula and the second was in The Thumb area. The current highway was originally part of M-47 until that road was relocated onto what was formerly US 10 in the Tri-Cities area. Since the 1960s reuse of the number, M-84 has been extended in the 1970s to replace part of Business Loop I-75 (BL I-75, now Business Spur I-75, BS I-75) in Bay City. Other projects have reconstructed and widened the roadway through the Bay City area in the early 21st century.

== Route description ==
M-84 begins at M-58 in a residential area on the west side of Saginaw heading due north on Bay Street. At this point, it is five lanes, with two lanes in each direction and a center turn lane. The highway enters Saginaw Township as Bay Road and serves as a major artery in the area, passing the Fashion Square Mall and several other shopping centers and major retail stores near Tittabawassee Road. The main entrance to Saginaw Valley State University is located on M-84 at Pierce Road just south of the Saginaw–Bay county line.

North of the line, the highway follows West Side Saginaw Road through fields in a less urbanized area. East of University Center and the campus of Delta College, M-84 crosses over I-75/US 23 at exit 160 and proceeds through several curves into Bay City. At the intersection with Euclid Avenue on the city line, M-13 merges in from the north and the two highways run concurrently along Salzburg Avenue. Since this segment of highway is both northbound M-84 and southbound M-13 along eastbound Salzburg Avenue, the two trunklines form a wrong-way concurrency.

M-13/M-84 crosses the west channel of the Saginaw River near the Ted Putz Nature Area to Middle Ground island. The highway continues over the east channel on the Lafayette Avenue Bridge, a drawbridge, to Lafayette Avenue on the eastern bank of the river. At the intersection with Broadway Street, M-13 turns southward, and M-84 continues eastward two more blocks. Turning north on Garfield Street, the highway runs parallel to the river through a residential area. North of the 14th Street intersection, Garfield Street curves northeasterly into Washington Avenue, passing to the east of an industrial complex on the river. At the intersection with McKinley Street, a one-way street, M-84 meets the eastbound direction of M-25 and BS I-75. One block north, M-84 terminates at the intersection with 7th Street, which carries westbound M-25 and BS I-75; both intersections also mark BS I-75's terminus immediately east of the Veterans Memorial Bridge.

The Michigan Department of Transportation (MDOT) maintains M-84 like other state highways in Michigan. As a part of these maintenance responsibilities, the department tracks the volume of traffic that uses the roadways under its jurisdiction. These volumes are expressed using a metric called annual average daily traffic, which is a statistical calculation of the average daily number of vehicles on a segment of roadway. MDOT's surveys in 2010 showed that the highest traffic level along M-84 was 26,408 vehicles daily in Saginaw; the lowest count was 8,405 vehicles per day on Washington Street in Bay City. Two sections of M-84 have been listed on the National Highway System; the section from the southern terminus north to Tittabawassee Road in the Saginaw area, and from the I-75/US 23 interchange north to M-25 in the Bay City area. The system is a network of roads important to the country's economy, defense, and mobility.

== History ==
The first M-84 in Michigan was in the Upper Peninsula starting in 1919; the highway ran from Garnet to McLeods Corner, southeast of Newberry, following the current Borgstrom Road in Mackinac County and County Road 393 in Luce County. The highway was replaced by an extension of M-48 in 1926. The M-84 designation was then immediately reused for a section of the former M-31 in The Thumb; it ran from M-81 near Reese running through Fairgrove and Akron to M-29 at Unionville. This iteration was replaced by M-83 in 1930.

The I-75/US 10/US 23 freeway was completed between Saginaw and Bay City in late 1960 or early 1961; M-47 was relocated to the former US 10 between Saginaw and Midland, and M-84 was redesignated along the former M-47 between M-81 at Saginaw and the freeway in Bay City. A new BL I-75 was created at the same time along the former M-47 in Bay City. This business loop would be split in half in 1971 resulting in a new business spur; M-84 was extended over the southern section between M-25 and I-75/US 10/US 23.

A reconstruction project in 2004–05 resulted in the roadway being widened to four lanes between Pierce Road in Kochville Township of Saginaw County and Delta Road in Frankenlust Township in Bay County. The 2009 reconstruction resulted in new bridges over I-75 and widening of the road from Delta Road to 2 Mile Road. Additional construction scheduled for 2011 resulted in the widening of the road from 2 Mile to Euclid.

== Major intersections ==
County	Location	mi	km	Destinations	Notes
Saginaw	Saginaw	0.000	0.000	M-58; Bay Street	Bay Street continues from beyond southern terminus; M-58 follows a one-way pairing on State Street and Davenport Avenue
Bay	Frankenlust Township	9.547– 9.636	15.364– 15.508	I-75 / US 23 – Mackinac Bridge, Saginaw	Exit 160 on I-75/US 23
Bay	Bay City–Monitor Township city line	11.963	19.253	M-13 north – Standish	Western end of M-13 concurrency
Bay	Bay City	13.081	21.052	M-13 south – Saginaw	Eastern end of M-13 concurrency
Bay	Bay City	14.641– 14.710	23.562– 23.673	BS I-75 west / M-25 / LHCT (McKinley Street, 7th Street)	
1.000 mi = 1.609 km; 1.000 km = 0.621 mi: Concurrency terminus
