= Things That Go Bump in the Night Film Festival =

Film festival in Bay City, Michigan

The Things That Go Bump In The Night Film Festival (BUMP FEST) is an annual event in Bay City, Michigan presenting films produced by local film makers. The films tend to be in the horror, thriller and suspense genres. The festival is presented by Even Keel Productions and aims to provide a platform for local film makers to showcase their appropriately themed short films. The current venue for the festival is the Westown Theater in Bay City, Michigan.

== History ==
The festival's inaugural showing was October 25, 2013 (with an encore October 26, 2013), at Whistling Idiots Comedy Dinner Theatre in Bay City, Michigan. Prior to the 2014 event, the first formal festival committee was formed. This included Wade Lodewyk, Brian Donaldson and Nic White. The 2014 festival was held on October 17, with an encore October 19. The venue was the Westown Theater in Bay City, Michigan. The event was also informally called BUMP FEST.
