= News design =

Process of arranging material on a newspaper page

News design is the process of arranging material on a newspaper page, according to editorial and graphical guidelines and goals. Main editorial goals include the ordering of news stories by order of importance, while graphical considerations include readability and balanced, unobtrusive incorporation of advertising.

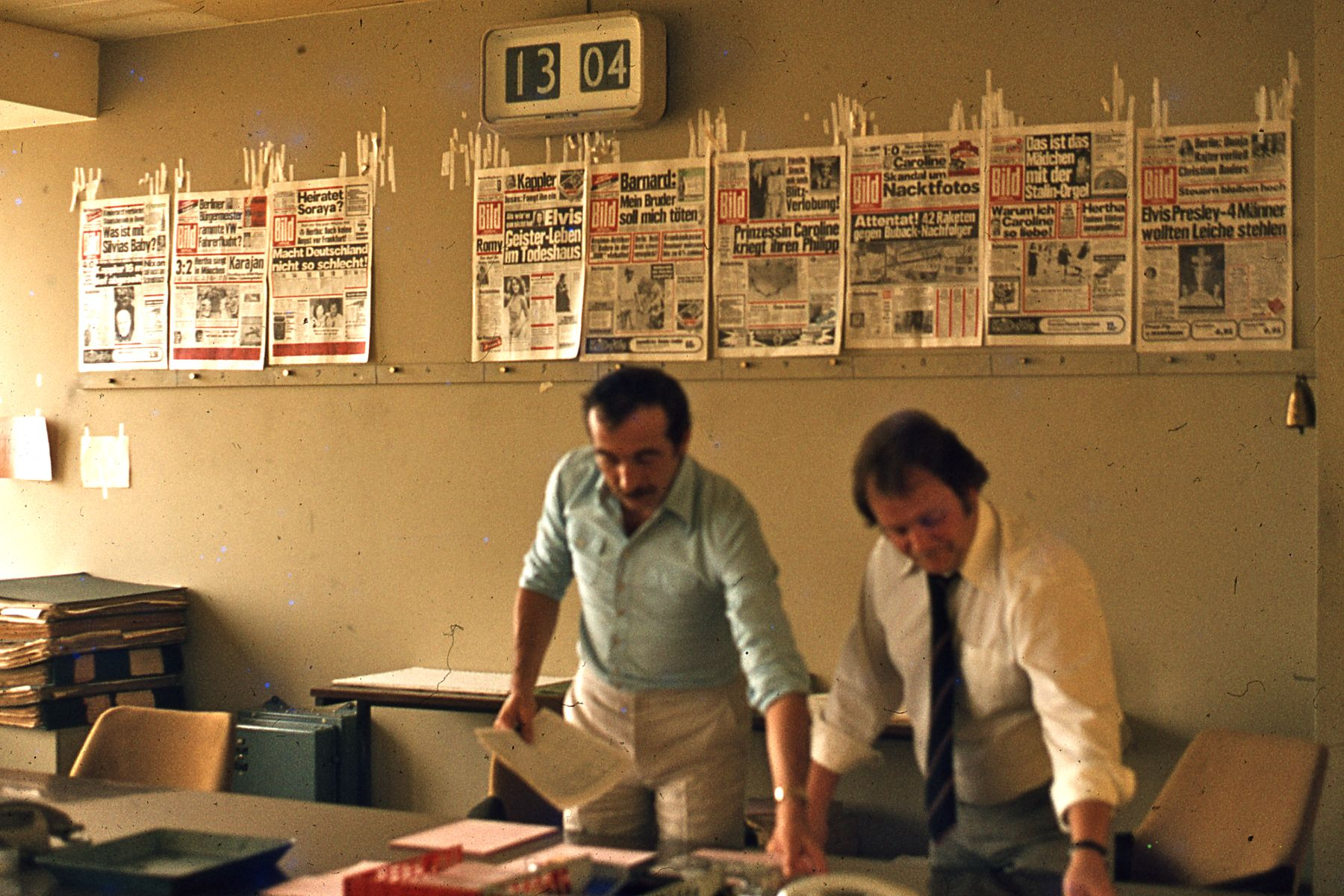
Editors work on producing an issue of Bild, 1977 in West Berlin. Previous front pages are affixed to the wall behind them.

News design incorporates principles of graphic design and is taught as part of journalism training in schools and colleges. Overlapping and related terms include layout, makeup (formerly paste up) and pagination.

The era of modern newspapers begins in the mid-nineteenth century, with the Industrial Revolution, and increased capacities for printing and distribution. Over time, improvements in printing technology, graphical design, and editorial standards have led to changes and improvements in the look and readability of newspapers. Nineteenth-century newspapers were often densely packed with type, often arranged vertically, with multiple headlines for each article. A number of the same technological limitations persisted until the advent of digital typesetting and pagination in late 20th century.

== Process ==
Designers typically use desktop publishing software to arrange the elements on the pages directly. In the past, before digital pre-press pagination, designers used precise "lay out dummies" to direct the exact layout of elements for each page.

A complete layout dummy was required for designating proper column widths by which a typesetter would set type, and arrange columns of text. Layout also required the calculation of lengths of copy (text in "column inches"), for any chosen width.

Much of the variance and incoherence of early newspapers was because last minute corrections were exclusively handled by typesetters. With photographic printing process, typesetting gave way to paste-up, whereby columns of type were printed by machines (phototypesetters) on high-resolution film for paste-up on photographed final prints. These prints in turn were "shot to negative" with a large format production camera —directly to steel-emulsion photographic plates.

Though paste-up put an end to cumbersome typesetting, this still required planned layouts and set column widths. Photographic plates are (still) wrapped on printing drums to directly apply ink to newsprint (paper). In the mid-1990s, the paste-up process gave way to the direct to plate process, where computer-paginated files were optically transmitted directly to the photographic plate. Replacing several in-between steps in newspaper production, direct to plate pagination allowed for much more flexibility and precision than before. Designers today still used column grid layouts only with layout software, such as Adobe InDesign or Quark.

== Design options ==
Designers choose photo sizes and headline sizes (both the size of the letters and how much space the headline will take). They may decide what articles will go on which pages, and where on the page, alone or in consultation with editors. They may choose typefaces for special pages, but newspapers usually have a design style that determines most routine uses.

== Notable news designers ==
John E. Allen in Linotype News of the 1930s was the first to write extensively about the design of the U.S. press, followed at mid century by Syracuse journalism professor Edmund Arnold, sometimes identified as the father of "modern" newspaper design, and journalist Harold Evans played a key role in British news design later in the century.

== See also ==
- Society for News Design
- Photo caption
- Page layout
