= Liberty Bridge (Bay City, Michigan) =

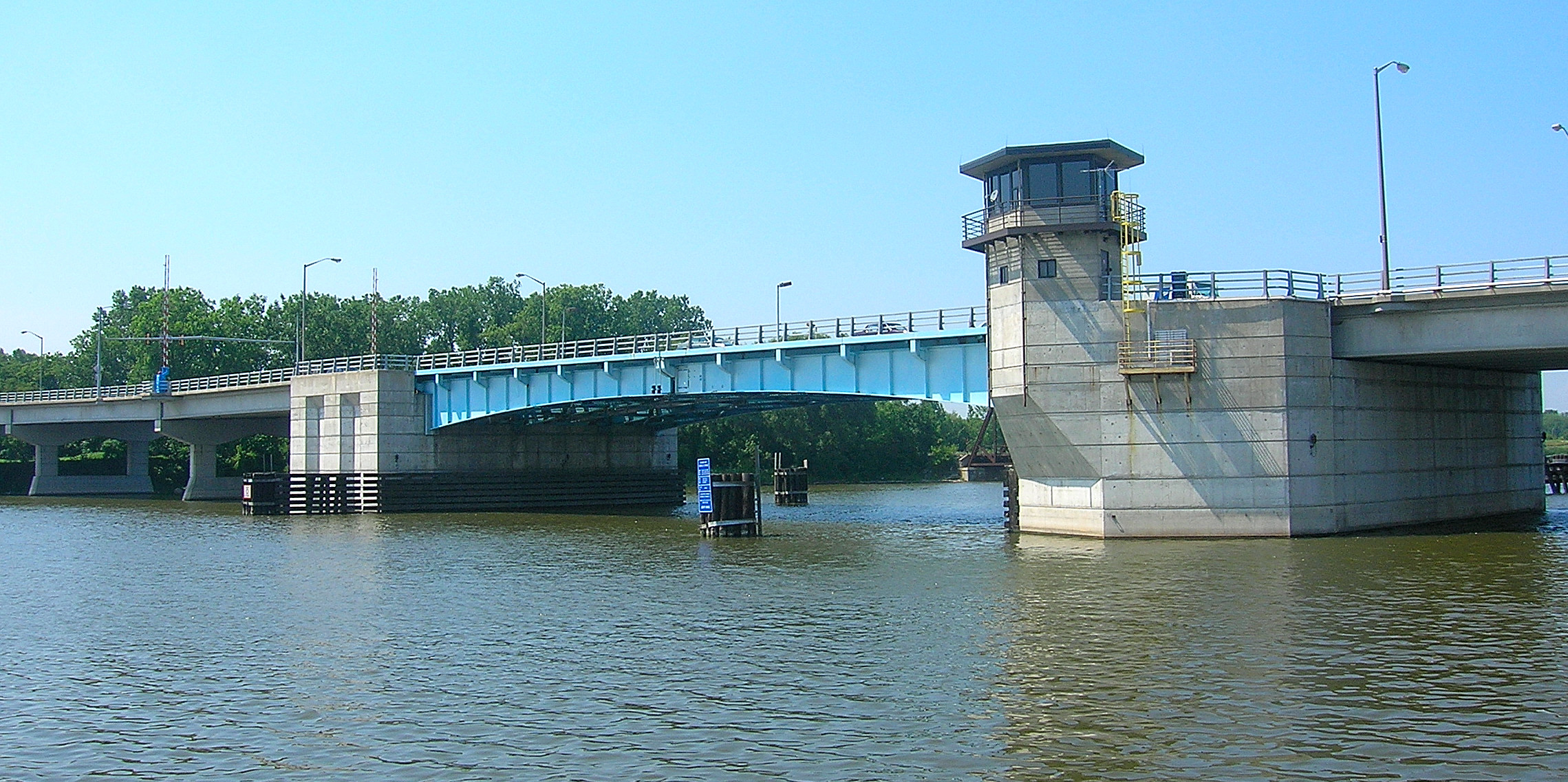
- Coordinates: 43.60466°N 83.8905°W
- Crosses: Saginaw River
- Locale: Bay City, Michigan
- Official name: Liberty Bridge
- Maintained by: Bay City Bridge Partners

Characteristics
- Design: Bascule bridge

History
- Opened: 1986

Statistics
- Daily traffic: 20,000 vehicles per day (approx.)

Location
- Interactive map of Liberty Bridge

The Liberty Bridge is a bascule bridge located in Bay City, Michigan, United States. It spans the Saginaw River and connects Vermont Street (on the west side of the river) and Woodside Avenue (on the east side). It was built in 1986. Starting June 16, 2023, an electronic toll is charged to motorists either through their BC-Pass, E-ZPass transponder, or via license plate photo.

== History ==
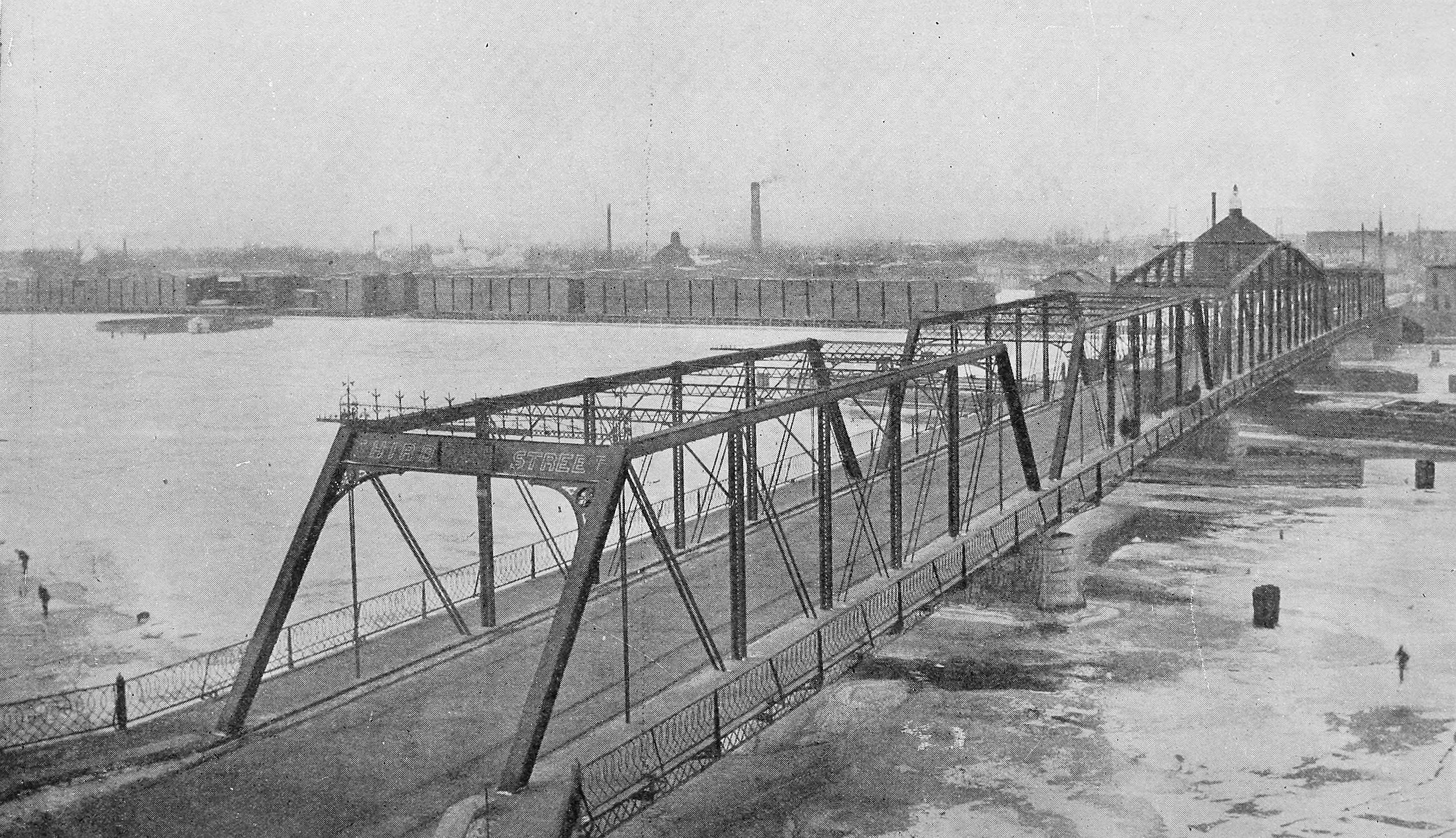
Third Street Bridge, the Liberty Bridge's predecessor, with Sage Mill in background, 1918. The bridge collapsed in 1976 after being hit by a freighter.

The Liberty Bridge was built to replace the Third Street Bridge, a small swing bridge located just south of the Liberty Bridge connecting Midland and Third Streets. The Third Street Bridge was the first bridge built across the Saginaw River in Bay City. It was originally built as a wooden bridge in 1864 by the Bay City Bridge Company. Its superstructure was reconstructed with iron and steel in 1872.

On June 18, 1976, the swing span of the Third Street Bridge collapsed as it was being opened, forcing the bridge out of service permanently. It had been struck by a vessel the evening before. A debate ensued on where to build a replacement bridge. In order to receive federal funding, the new bridge was required to have four lanes. A four-lane bridge at the same site would have necessitated the demolition of some historic buildings. As a result, the Liberty Bridge was built just north of the old bridge site, connecting Woodside Avenue and Vermont Street.

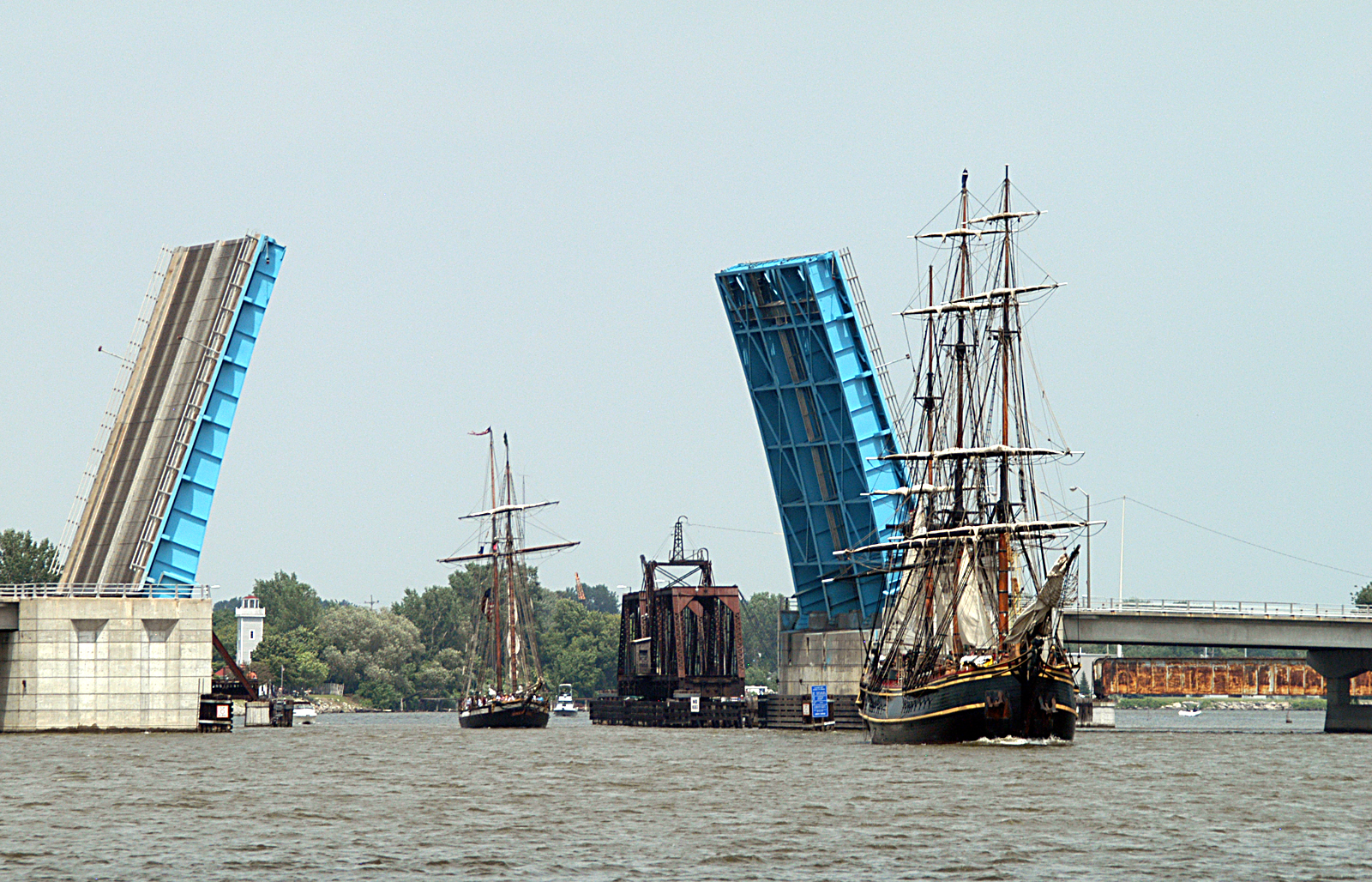
Liberty Bridge opened for tall ships in 2010

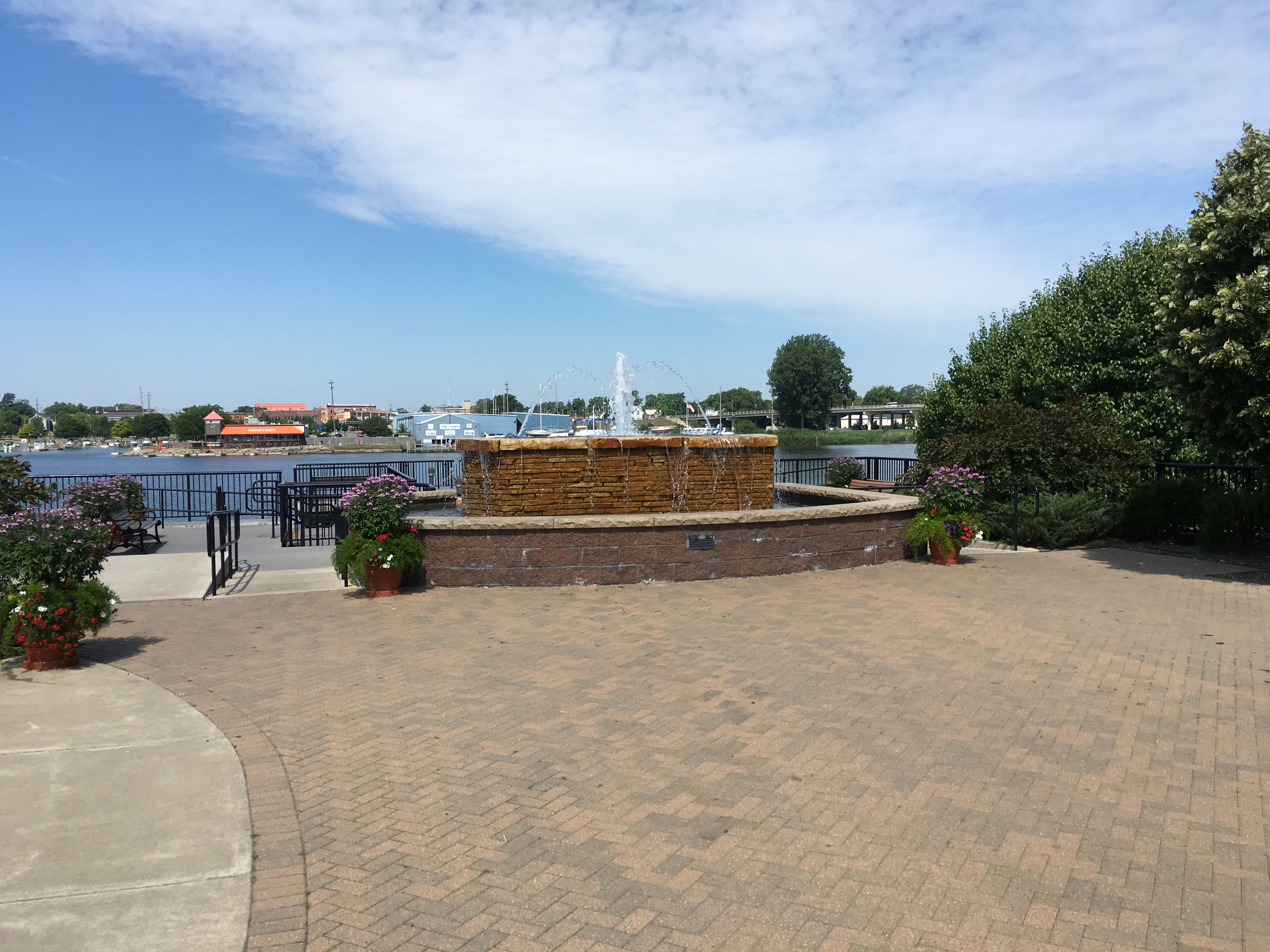
The Third Street Waterfall Park today marks the location of the former Third Street Bridge
