= History of Saginaw, Michigan =

Coordinates: 43°25′04″N 83°57′52″W

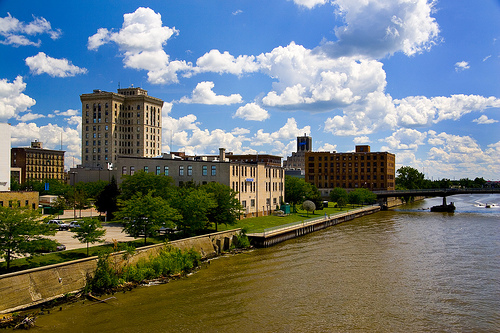
East Saginaw Historic Business District, and in the center distance, the Michigan Bell Building, both of which are on the National Register of Historic Places.

The history of Saginaw, Michigan explores the development of the city from the time that Native American hunter-gatherers ranged through the area. There was little settlement, though, until the 19th century when the marshes were drained to alleviate the endemic mosquito infestation.

The site of what later became the city of Saginaw was originally inhabited by the Anishnabeg. French missionaries and traders first appeared in the area during the late 17th century and encountered the Ojibwe (Chippewa) living in the area. Because of convenient means of travel to the area by rivers, streams, and Lake Huron, the area was one of the sites of councils of The Three Fires: Ojibwe, Pottawatomi, and Ottawa. Henri Nouvel, a Jesuit missionary visited the area in the 17th century and recorded his travels in a journal. A trading post was established by Louis Campeau in 1816. The Treaty of Saginaw in 1819 cleared the way for settlement by white people. To control the Ojibwe in the region, the United States government established Fort Saginaw in 1822, but the mosquito infestation and humidity was so severe that the fort was closed in 1824. Campau platted a town, but few lots were sold for some time. Also in 1822, Saginaw County was established.

Saginaw realized significant growth due to the lumber industry boom of the 19th century. Two cities had been established Saginaw City and East Saginaw, which were consolidated into the current city of Saginaw in March, 1890.

The city grew substantially as automotive manufacturers opened plants in Saginaw and when the city answered the call to produce munitions and motor vehicle parts during World War II. African-Americans migrated from the south for manufacturing jobs and Saginaw saw a significant change in the demographics within the city, which created racial tensions that affected the political climate and opportunities for African-Americans, such as the ability to purchase houses.

In the late 20th century, the city began to decline economically as the number of manufacturing jobs declined significantly and the rate of unemployment increased dramatically. More recently, economic development in the region is focused on comparative advantages in innovation, clean energy, and continued manufacturing exports.

== Early history ==
=== Native People ===
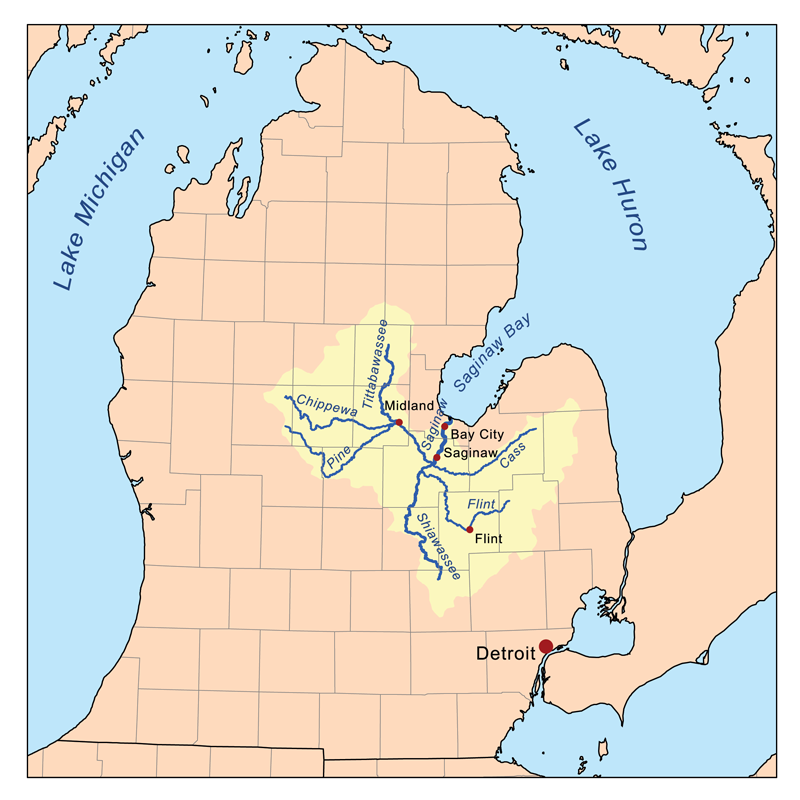
Map of Saginaw River system

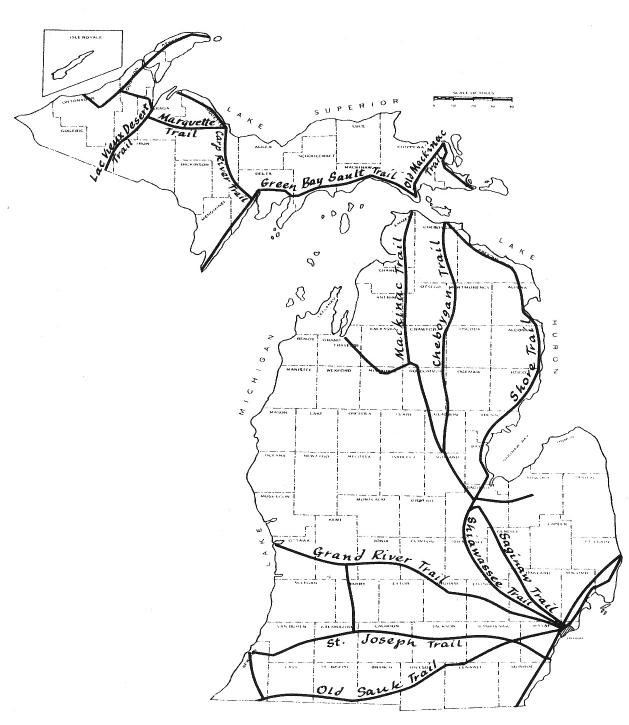
Map of the pre-statehood Indian trails. The Sauk Trail is also known as Chicago Road

The area of the present City of Saginaw was inhabited from about 1000 B.C. to 1000 A.D. by the Hopewell people, followed by the Anishnabeg. The area surrounding Green Point, an island at the intersection of the Saginaw and Tittabawasee rivers, provided sufficient rice, fish, and waterfowl to sustain Hopewell population growth.

The Hopewell introduced agriculture to the region, growing squash, sunflowers, pumpkin, corn, and beans. They also innovated the large-scale production of pottery, which including pieces used for cooking. Growing reliance on agriculture lead to an shift away from hunting and gathering, though settlements along the shorelines were most convenient for fishing and travel via canoe. Native Americans in the area travelled to access seasonal food and resources, and the Saginaw River area was continually revisited for fishing and farming during spring and summer. Green Point archaeological sites have found 20 species of fish bones consumed by inhabitants, estimated to make up 25-30% of local food supplies. Maple syrup gathering was an essential task in the spring. Anthropologist Richard Yarnell documented 130 plants used as food by local cultures during this period.

Plants were gathered by Native people to meet their material needs. Important plants in the area and their uses include:

Trees
Name	Food & Beverage	Medicine - Beverage	Medicine - Other	Charms & Ceremonial	Smoking Materials	Dye Plants	Crafts & Technology
Green ash							X
Quaking aspen	X		X				
Paper birch						X	X
Black cherry	X	X					
Box elder	X		X				
Red oak	X		X			X	
White pine	X	X	X				X
Sassafras	X		X				

Shrubs & Bushes
Name	Food & Beverage	Medicine - Beverage	Medicine - Other	Charms & Ceremonial	Smoking Materials	Dye Plants	Crafts & Technology
Speckled alder			X			X	X
Blueberry	X	X					
Red osier dogwood			X		X	X	X
Common elder	X	X					
Bush honeysuckle		X					
Serviceberry	X		X				X
Staghorn sumac	X		X		X	X	
Willow			X		X		X

Smaller Plants
Name	Food & Beverage	Medicine - Beverage	Medicine - Other	Charms & Ceremonial	Smoking Materials	Dye Plants	Crafts & Technology
Bracken fern	X	X					
Cattail							X
Goldenrod		X	X		X		
Riverbank grape	X	X					
Northern blue flag			X	X			X
Jack-in-the-pulpit			X				
Common milkweed	X		X	X			X

Indigenous land management and food production techniques shaped the local ecosystem prior to European contact. Cultural burning to increase forest food production, as well as the storage of fish in man-made ponds, led to extensive flooding and silting in the Saginaw River Basin. The present City of Saginaw itself served as a location for semi-permanent settlement until the time of European contact. This may be due, in part, to the low lying and frequently flooding land adjacent to the Saginaw River, much of which was marshland prior to being drained in the 19th century. Mosquito infestation was endemic to the area.

The Saginaw region includes an extensive network of many rivers and streams that converge into the Saginaw River, which provided a means for easy travel for the Native American population among numerous settlements and hunting areas, including access to Lake Huron. Saginaw was also a frequent meeting location for the Council of Three Fires, an Anishinaabe alliance between the Ojibwe, Ottawa and Pottawatomi peoples.

Some historians believe that the Sauk previously lived in the area and were driven out by the Ojibwe (Chippewa), before the area was first visited by Europeans. This claim is still heavily disputed, as it is believed Samuel de Champlain confused Native American descriptions of the Sauk living along western Lake Michigan with those living on the west coast of Lake Huron. The Ojibwe and Odawa engaged in many battles with the Sauk across Lake Michigan. Champlain was only aware of Lake Huron at the time, not Lake Michigan. Bones found on Skull Island, once believed to belong to Sauk people who died in battle, were likely the removed remains of local smallpox victims. The name of the area as Saginaw most likely comes from the Ojibwe words meaning 'the place of the outlet', made of "sag" (to flow out) and "ong" (place of).

=== French missionaries ===
French missionaries first reached the area in the 17th century. Henri Nouvel, a Jesuit missionary who made repeated visits to the Native Americans present in the area, is of particular significance. He recorded information concerning his travels during the 1670s in his journals.

=== Territory of the United States ===
The French controlled the territory consisting of the present day State of Michigan until it was ceded to the British following the Seven Years' War in 1763. The French established permanent settlements in many locations throughout the Great Lakes, but most of the interior of the Lower Peninsula of Michigan, including the Saginaw River valley, was undeveloped. Both the French and the British primarily maintained settlements for trade and strategic defense, neither of which provided much reason to develop the Saginaw region.

Following the British defeat during the American Revolutionary War, Michigan was officially ceded by treaty to the United States in 1784. Despite this, the British remained in de facto control of the area for long after. It was not until after the conclusion of the War of 1812 that all presence of British military was removed from what is present-day Michigan.

== 19th century ==
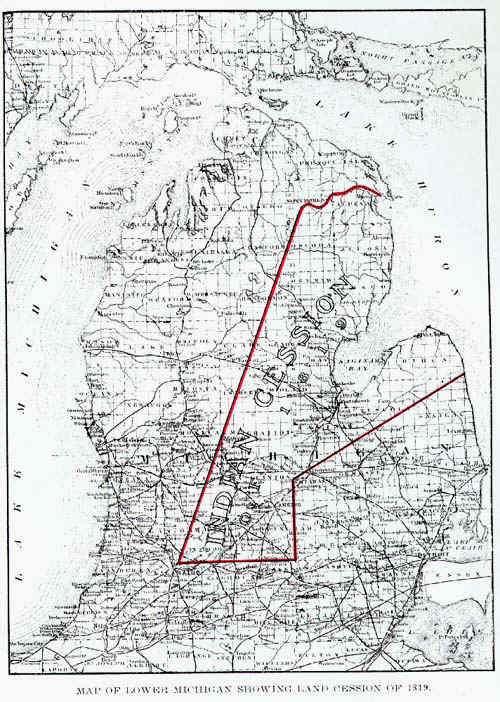
Map showing cession of Indian Lands by Saginaw Treaty of 1819

=== Trading post ===
The first permanent white settlement in the area was a fur-trading post on the west side of the Saginaw River established in 1816 by Louis Campau. The U.S. federal government extinguished Native American interests for most of the land in the area with the Treaty of Saginaw in 1819, clearing the way for white settlers.

=== Fort Saginaw ===
In 1822, the trading post was used by the U.S. Army to establish Fort Saginaw to control the actions of the Ojibwe in the region. Due to the undesirable conditions of intense humidity and mosquito infestation, the Fort was abandoned by 1824.

=== Saginaw city and county ===
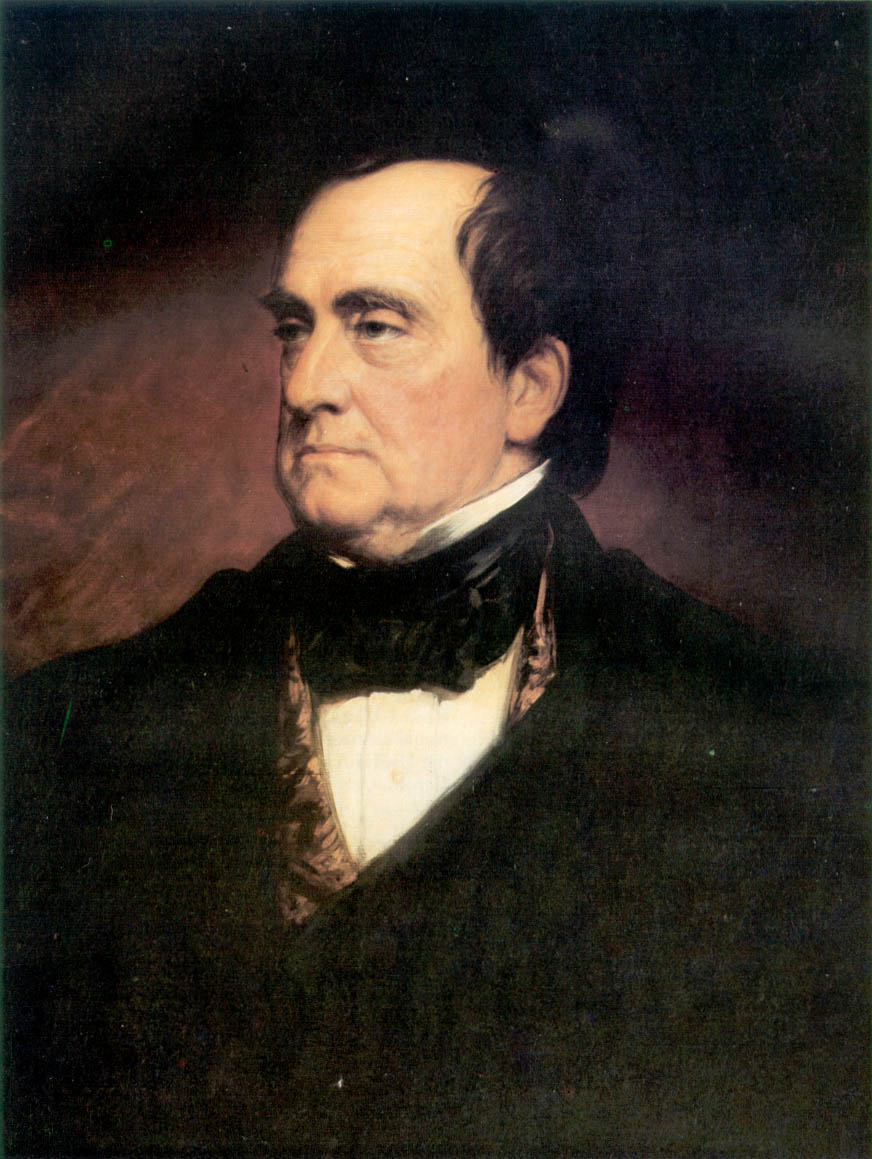
Territorial Governor Lewis Cass

On September 10, 1822, Territorial Governor Lewis Cass issued a proclamation that set off the boundaries of Saginaw County, although it remained attached to Oakland County for administrative purposes until there was sufficient population to organize a separate government. The county boundaries initially included what is now the southern portion of Bay County and Midland County and the northwest corner of Shiawassee County.

Campau platted the town in 1823 under the name "Town of Sagana" but few plots were sold. The town languished for most of the following decade, but was re-platted in December 1830, comprising river front from Cass St. on the south to Harrison St. and north to Jefferson. These plots sold slowly. By 1835, only 24 had been sold and the remainder were transferred to a new owner, who made another plat in February 1837. However, the financial crisis of the Panic of 1837 dampened interest in purchasing properties. After selling only 58 out of the 407 plots, the remainder was sold again in 1841. Many of the early Euro-American settlers of Saginaw married Ojibwe women. For example, Jacob Gradroot, a native of Germany who was the first European or Euro-American to settle permanently along the Saginaw River below Fort Saginaw, married a daughter of the Ojibwe leader Kishkawko.

In 1831, the northwest corner of Saginaw County was detached to become a part of Midland County. In 1835, the southeast corner was detached to become a part of Genesee County. In 1857, the northern portion was detached to become a part of Bay County, although the precise alignment of the northern boundary shifted several more times in subsequent years.

On July 12, 1830, the Territorial Legislature passed an act that erected the Township of Saginaw, effective with the first town meeting on April 4, 1831. The township comprised all of Saginaw County, which at the time was still attached to Oakland County. On January 28, 1835, the Territorial Legislature passed an act organizing county government in Saginaw County, effective on February 9, 1835.

Four years before the county government was organized, another proclamation by Governor Cass on January 11, 1831, located the county seat at what was to become the City of Saginaw. The settlement was which had been platted for that purpose by a group of area residents.

=== Lumber boom ===
The main cause for the development of Saginaw was the lumber needs of the growing American nation. A virgin growth forest principally consisting of white pine trees covered most of Michigan. The convenient access to water transportation provided by the Saginaw River and its numerous tributaries fueled a massive expansion in population and economic activity. As the trees were being felled in the region, logs were floated down the rivers to sawmills located in Saginaw, then to be loaded onto ships and later railroad cars.

Multiple settlements comprise what now is the present-day City of Saginaw. On the west side of the river the first settlement around what had been Fort Saginaw developed into Saginaw, which was incorporated as the City of Saginaw in 1857 and contained the seat of Saginaw County government. On the east side of the river a parallel settlement, East Saginaw, developed which was incorporated first as a village in 1855, and then as a city in 1859. Also south of the City of East Saginaw on the east bank of the river the village of Salina formed. Its name relates to the salty brine that led to a growing industry of salt production in the area. Both Saginaw and East Saginaw quickly became a hub for railroad transportation in addition to ships on the Saginaw River. Also on the east side of the river was Florece, another sawmill settlement, that was eventually absorbed into Saginaw.

Lumber production peaked by the early 1870s and had virtually disappeared by the end of the 19th century. In addition to salt production, which experienced an eventual decline as well, growing industries supporting the area's agriculture and manufacturing developed.

=== Consolidation of west and east sides ===
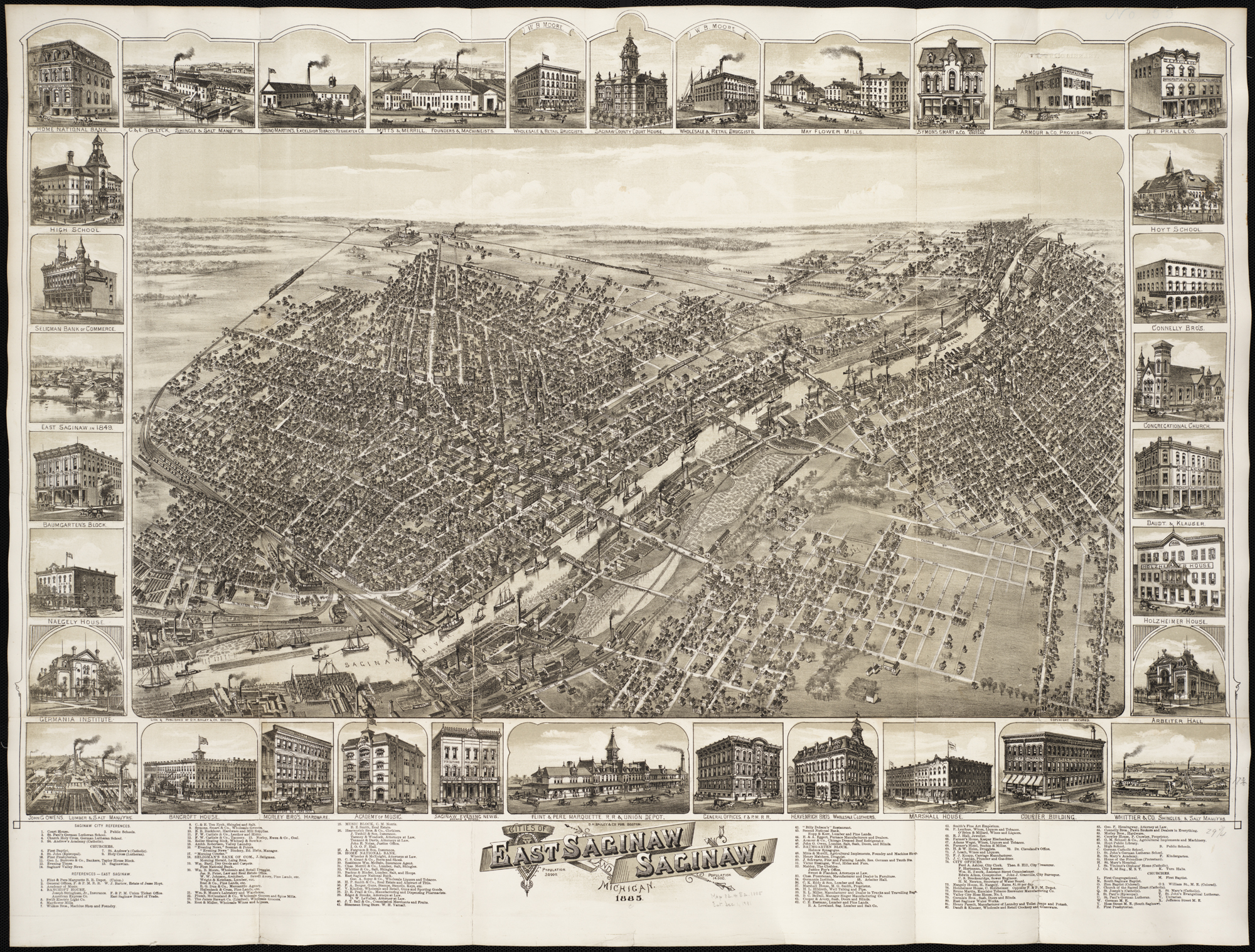
Cities of East Saginaw and Saginaw, Michigan, 1885 before they were consolidated into Saginaw in March, 1890

On June 28, 1889, the Michigan Legislature passed Act 455 to consolidate the City of Saginaw and the City of East Saginaw into a new city that also was named the City of Saginaw. Prior to this consolidation, the village of Salina had already been added to the City of East Saginaw. The consolidation of the City of Saginaw became effective with the election of officers on March 12, 1890. The provisions of the city charter were established by the same act of the legislature that provided for the consolidation. The city was governed by a city council consisting of two aldermen elected from 21 wards and an executive mayor who had fairly weak powers because numerous other elected officials and elected or appointed boards controlled much of the administrative and executive functions of government. The efficient and cohesive functioning of the city's government also was constrained by remaining rivalries between residents, business owners, and politicians from the former two cities. The distinctions and rivalries between the east and west sides of the City of Saginaw persisted throughout the ensuing century in various forms, and influences Saginaw's political and economic experiences even at the present time.

== 20th century ==
=== Industrial economy ===
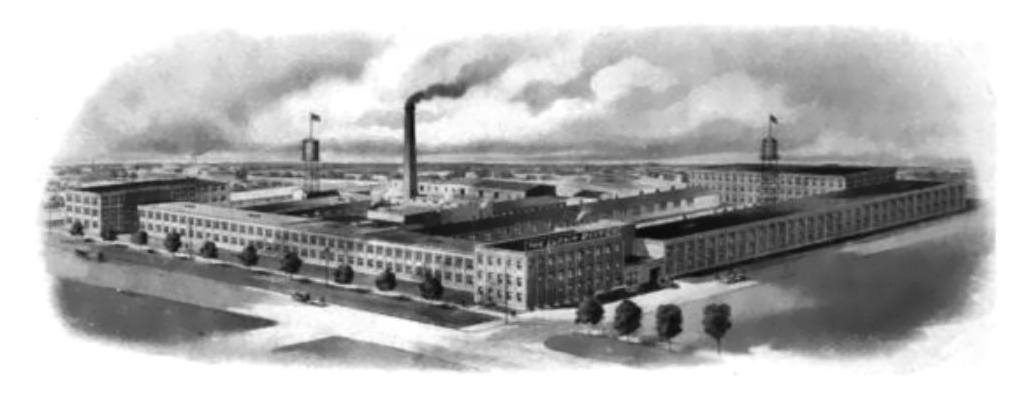
Lufkin Rule Manufacturing Plant, Saginaw, 1918

At the dawn of the 20th century, production of motor vehicles became prolific throughout many communities in Michigan, but most notably Detroit. In Saginaw, the Jackson, Wilcox and Church Company produced carriages to be drawn by horses, and later produced components used in motor vehicles. The company was eventually acquired by General Motors and formed the basis for its Steering Gear division. Additionally, General Motors established foundries and other manufacturing facilities in Saginaw. The early development of automotive production within Saginaw would set the course for the future economic circumstances of the city.

=== Home Rule government ===
After a new state constitution was adopted in 1908 that mandated increased home rule powers for local units of government, the legislature enacted the Home Rule Cities Act in 1909. Under this statute, cities are permitted to frame and adopt their own city charters and are given great flexibility in structuring local government. The government under the 1889 Charter had continued to be inefficient and provided for much political infighting. In 1913, a new city charter was adopted with voter approval that followed the commission form of city government that was popular in many American cities in the early 20th century. The new government consisted of five commissioners each elected separately at-large who served both as the city council and the executive heads of city government departments. One of the commissioners served as mayor, a mostly ceremonial role.

In 1935, the voted adopted a charter based upon the council-manager form of government. The charter, which took effect in 1936, gave overall responsibility for city government administration to the city manager, who was accountable to a nine-member city council. The system was designed to address administrative inefficiency and political tensions associated with having executive and administrative authority spread among many different officers and boards as well as disputes that arose between the east and west sides of the city.

=== 20th century boom ===
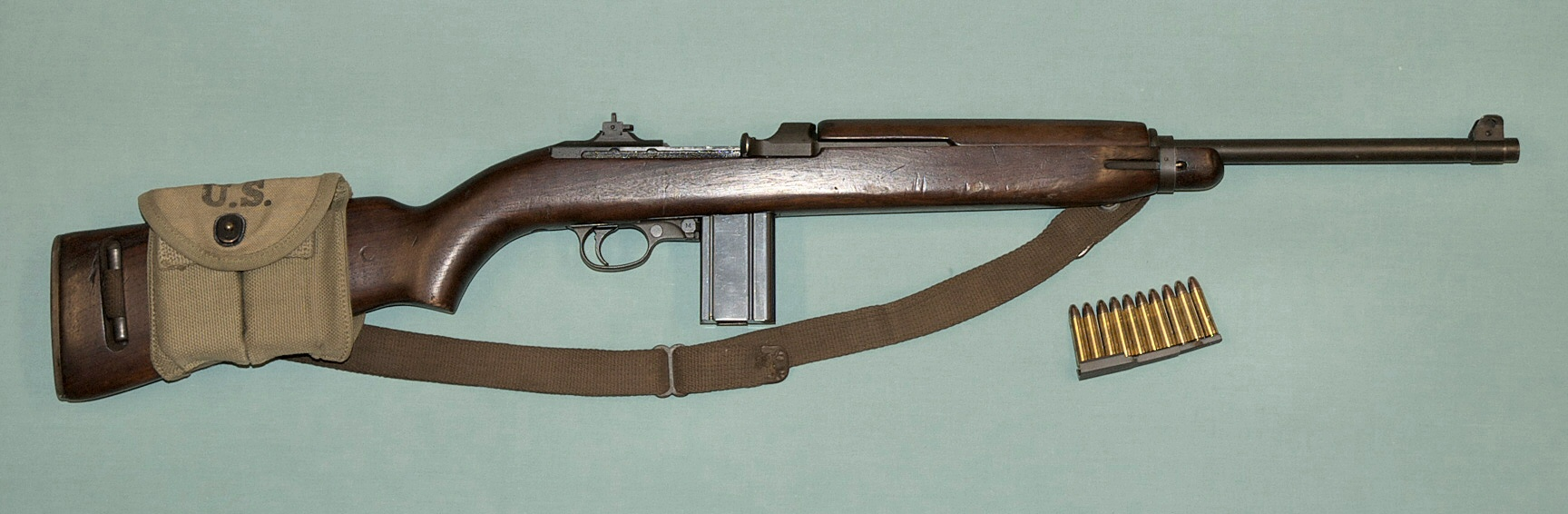
An example of a WW II M1 Carbine with a magazine pouch mounted on the stock that held two spare 15-round magazines

As the United States entered the conflict of World War II, Saginaw's industrial complex was geared towards production supporting the war effort. Munitions and components for military vehicles made Saginaw a significant contributor to the nation's eventual victory. Specifically, Saginaw was home to one production facility that produced over half a million M1 Carbine rifles for the US Military during World War II.

Saginaw became the destination for a great number of workers migrating from areas of the United States that were greatly devastated by the Great Depression, especially from the south. This migration continued throughout the war years and in the economic boom, which followed. Saginaw, like most of America, benefited from the dramatic economic prosperity following the war. General Motors expanded its presence in Saginaw, and other manufacturers increased production as well. This caused the population of the city to swell to its height of approximately 100,000 during the 1960s.

The needs of a growing city were met by significant investment in Saginaw's infrastructure. Notably, Saginaw constructed a 65-mile-long (105 km) water supply pipeline drawing water from Lake Huron in 1947 to meet the anticipated needs of the community. In addition, the cities of Midland and Bay City along with Saginaw jointly developed and began to operate an airport facility in nearby Tittabawassee Township that is now MBS International Airport.

=== Late 20th century ===
In the years following World War II, the legislature of the State of Michigan enacted laws making it increasingly difficult for incorporated cities to expand by annexing adjacent territory contained within townships. Townships, which had historically served a rural population, were given the ability to provide nearly all of the same services that an incorporated city can. Residential growth in neighboring townships led the City of Saginaw to provide water under long-term contracts to such other units of government. This increased the ability of adjacent townships to further develop. The unintended consequence of this was that the city of Saginaw stopped growing in population and new housing development slowed significantly.

As a result of migrations of workers from other parts of the United States, particularly the south, Saginaw's African-American population expanded significantly in proportion to those of European ancestry. Attitudes of racism promoted the segregation of African-American residents into concentrated neighborhoods almost exclusively within the city's east side. Mortgage lenders and real estate sales agents enacted redlining tactics to control where African-Americans lived. Gradually most of the east side's white population migrated either to the west side or to adjacent townships. The Saginaw River became seen as a dividing line for segregated racial groups in Saginaw. As a result, emphasis of political campaigns have focused on racial tensions, public services, and blight. After the eventual breakdown of institutionally enforced segregation and increased opportunities for African-Americans, however, the west side has become significantly more diverse in its ethnic and racial composition and no longer has almost exclusively white residents.

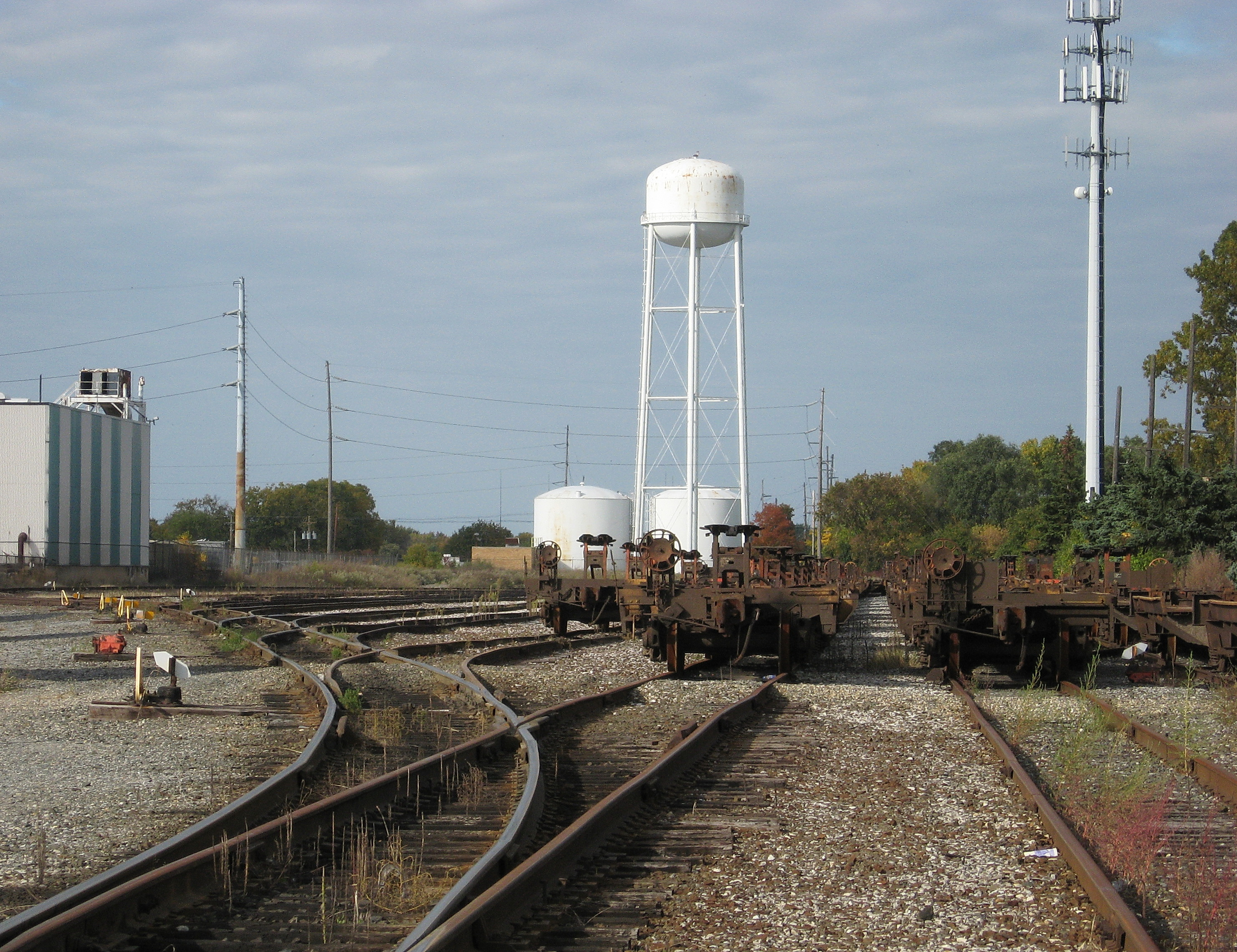
Rusted equipment in the Saginaw Yard on Lansing Manufacturers Railroad

The decline of manufacturing jobs has resulted in high rates of unemployment. There has been a decline in property values, which has reduced the city's revenue that is collected through property taxes. Saginaw has experienced a significant rate of crime activity while at the same time being forced to decrease the size of its police department. Overall, the number of employees and size and scope of city government is now nearly half of its level during the 1970s.

Currently, economic development is focused on comparative advantages in innovation, clean energy, and continued manufacturing exports. Compared to other mid-sized communities, Saginaw has a disproportionately high number of patents per employee, and more than 81 times the average US share of jobs in photovoltaic technology research and production. The city continues to have a higher proportion of manufacturing jobs in comparison to the US.

== Gallery ==
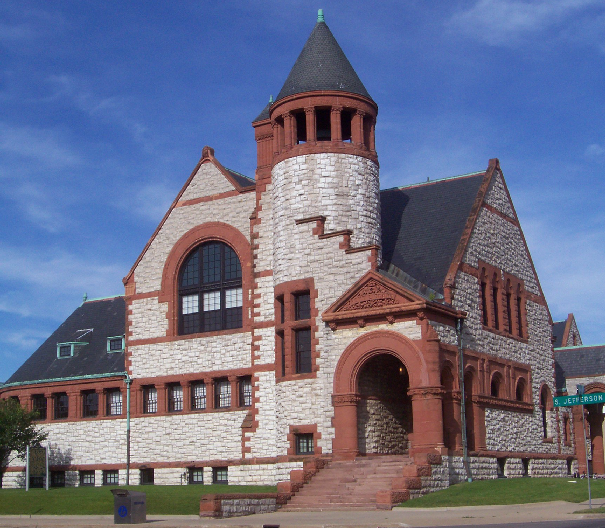
Hoyt Public Library built in 1887

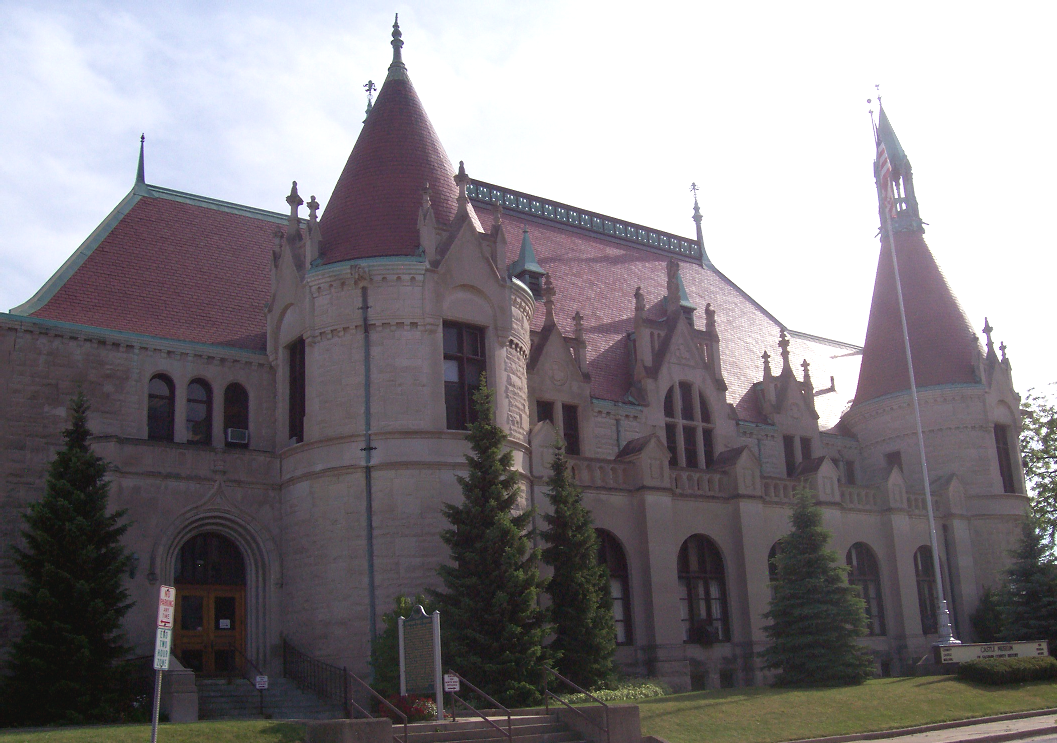
The former East Saginaw Post Office now is the site for the Castle Museum of Saginaw County History.

== See also ==
- Saginaw Trail
