= Saginaw Potter Street station =

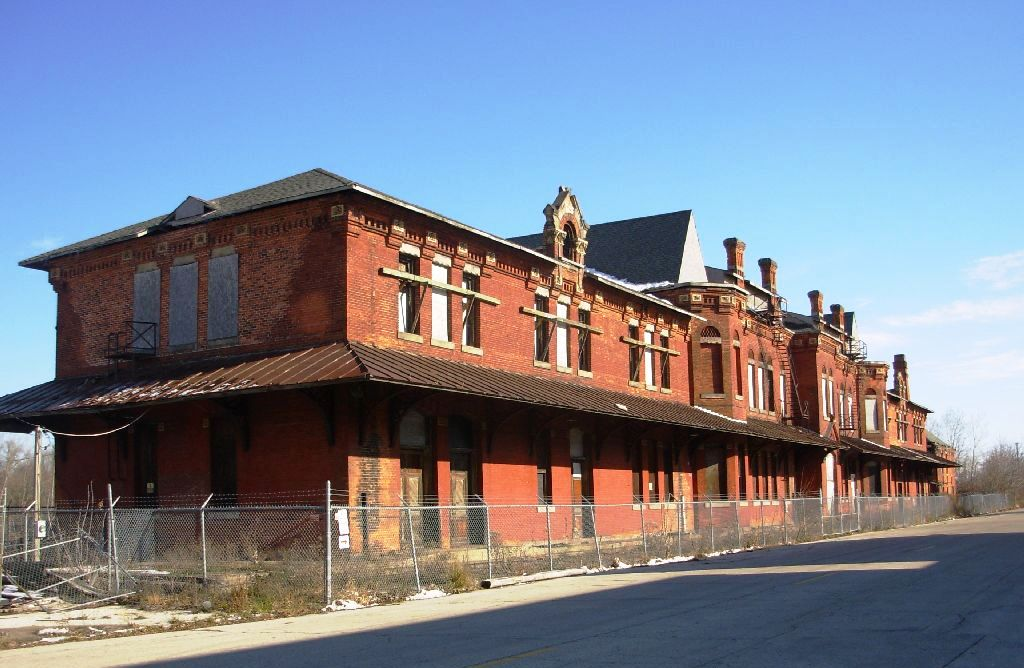

- Location within Michigan
- Interactive map
- Alternative names: Potter Street Station

General information
- Type: Railroad Station
- Location: 501 Potter Street; Saginaw, Michigan
- Coordinates: 43.440833°N 83.933333°W
- Completed: 1881

Technical details
- Floor count: 2 1/2 stories

Design and construction
- Architect: Bradford Lee Gilbert
- Flint and Pere Marquette Railroad East Saginaw Depot
- U.S. National Register of Historic Places
- Michigan State Historic Site
- Architectural style: Late Victorian
- MPS: Center Saginaw MRA
- NRHP reference No.: 96001378

Significant dates
- Designated: November 29, 1996
- Designated MSHS: December 19, 1991

Saginaw Potter Street station, formerly known as East Saginaw station and Saginaw East Shore station is a former railroad station built in 1881 and used until 1950 located at 501 Potter Street in Saginaw, Michigan, United States. It was designed by New York City architect Bradford Lee Gilbert. The station is 285 feet by 40 feet with 2½ stories.

== Development and construction ==
Before the Flint & Pere Marquette Railroad came to Saginaw, the City of Saginaw was divided into two cities. Saginaw City (known today as the west side of Saginaw) was the oldest part of the city, and East Saginaw was later established. The two cities, at times, would rival one another. When the F&PM proposed their road through the cities, they planned to enter East Saginaw from the southeast near Brady Hill, and cross the river near Bristol Street. There would have been a depot on the east side where City Hall now stands, and another on the west side of the river.

Immediately the F&PM was faced with opposition from Saginaw city officials, claiming that their city should have the rights to the road since Saginaw was the oldest town. Their goal was to cut East Saginaw off from any rail service by recommending the road came in from the south and cross the river at Mackinaw Street, with a depot near Gratiot and Mackinaw Streets.

East Saginaw businessmen retaliated by encouraging the F&PM to cut Saginaw off completely by entering East Saginaw north of the business section. They then purchased a large tract of land near Washington and Potter Streets for a depot and terminals.

During its construction in October 1881, the Saginaw Daily Courier stated: "... the new depot is the largest railway passenger depot in the state. It is designed to be practical, substantial and businesslike. Nothing for mere ornamentation, ..."

By 1947, the Flint and Pere Marquette was gone, having been merged to form the Pere Marquette Railway in 1900, which was then purchased by the Chesapeake and Ohio Railway. Three years later, C&O discontinued passenger service in Saginaw and in 1955, had plans to demolish the building with the intention of using the land for new offices and a warehouse. This never happened and thus, the station was used as a crew base until 1986, when C&O successor, CSX Transportation closed the station. It is currently vacant and owned by a non-profit organization called The Saginaw Depot Preservation Corporation (SDPC). The station was involved in an arson fire on April 16, 1991. The SDPC was able to obtain a grant from MDOT to repair the roof in 1993. The SDPC continues to apply for grants to stabilize and preserve the station.

The station was added to the National Register of Historic Places on November 29, 1996.

== Timeline ==
1857 - Railroad company formed in Saginaw to build a line from Pere Marquette, now Ludington, to Flint.

1859 - First rail of the Flint line is laid at a point near Washington and Potter.

1862 - Flint & Pere Marquette Railroad opens its first section of track from Saginaw to Mount Morris. The inaugural trip was on Jan. 20. One hundred Saginawians took the journey.

1881 - Potter Street Station is built. Railway passenger service was at its peak from the 1800s well into the 1900s. The birth of the automobile and improved highways and roads were the demise of the railroads.

1950 - Passenger service from the Potter Street Station is discontinued.

1955 - Chesapeake & Ohio Railways, owners of the Potter Street Station, suggest tearing down the depot in order to build a new warehouse- office building.

1964 - New York Central Railroad coach, Beeliner regional service, is the last passenger train from Saginaw. The train's daily run was from Detroit to Saginaw to Bay City and back. The New York Central depot was on West Genesee near Michigan.

1986 - Potter Street Station is closed by Chesapeake & Ohio successor CSX Transportation.

1988 - CSX Transportation, formerly Chesapeake & Ohio Railways, offers to sell the depot to the city of Saginaw for $1.00. The city declines the offer due to upkeep and liability.

1989 - City officials order CSX Transportation to demolish the Potter Street Station by September 1988. Area railroad and history enthusiasts develop rescue plans.

1989 - CSX sold depot to the Saginaw Depot Preservation Corporation for $10,000.

1990 - January - CSX transfer title to the Saginaw Depot Preservation Corporation.

1991 - Saginaw City Council proposed demolition of the depot under the city's Dangerous Buildings Ordinance.

1991, April 16–17 - Fire severely damages Potter Street Station.

1993 - January - Michigan Governor John Engler awarded a grant of $181,600 to the City of Saginaw for the stabilization of the depot upon application by the SDPC.

1998 - The roof was repaired.

2007 - A $1 million renovation grant was provided by the Department of Housing and Urban Development though the funds had a time limit for disbursement and the SDPC was unable to meet the deadline for the grant and it was never awarded.

== Description ==
The East Saginaw Depot is a large two-story, red brick, hip-roof structure trimmed with stone. The structure includes both the depot proper and an adjacent boiler or power house. The depot is long and narrow, measuring about 285 feet in length and forty in width. The facades are nearly symmetrical, with three sets of bays (a square-plan central one flanked by slant-sided ones) which rise to an upper cross-wise hip roof, spanning the depot from side to side. Broad dormers with round-arch windows are set in the roofs. A central square-plan, pyramid-roof tower tops the entire depot. Exterior details include accent bands of darker-color brick at window-sill and -lintel level and above doorways, brick panel friezes with terra cotta work, and sawtooth brickwork panels above some windows. A single-story shed-roof canopy supported by large iron brackets surrounds the building. The adjacent boiler house building is a square, two-story hip-roof structure. The depot and adjacent building sit at one end of the main freight railyard used by the Lake State Railway out of Saginaw as the main line crosses Washington Street before going across the Saginaw River, reaching the diamond interchange on the border with the Saginaw city limits and Carrollton Township, then either proceeding through the Genesse railyard used by the Huron and Eastern Railway, back over the Saginaw River to head south to Flint, or along the riverfront to head west towards Breckenridge.

Preceding station	Chesapeake and Ohio Railway	Following station
South Bay City toward Bay City	Bay City – Detroit	Bridgeport toward Detroit
Mershon toward Ludington	Ludington – Saginaw (Note: Ludington–Toledo direct service before 1930s as part of Pere Marquette Railway. Service previously bypassed Detroit via Plymouth)	Terminus
Terminus	Saginaw – Port Huron	Gera toward Port Huron
Terminus	Saginaw, Tuscola & Huron Railroad	Creens toward Bad Axe
Loop Switch toward Bay City	PM Saginaw – Bay City	Reverses direction
Mershon toward Saginaw (West Shore)	PM Saginaw – Bay City	Reverses direction
Mershon toward Genesee Avenue	PM Saginaw Belt Line commuter	Terminus

== Gallery ==
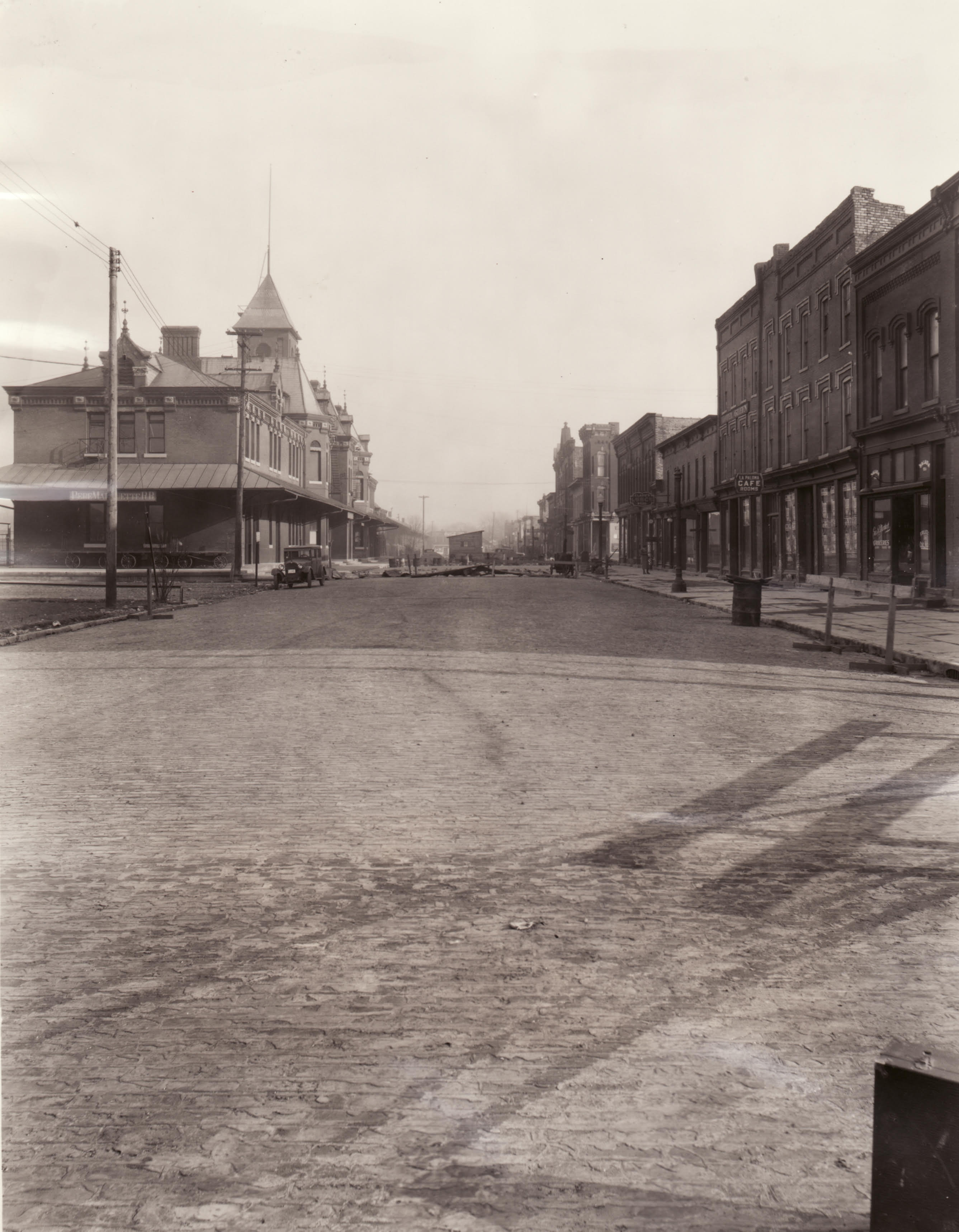
Potter Street with Pere Marquette Railroad Station and surrounding businesses, 1910s.

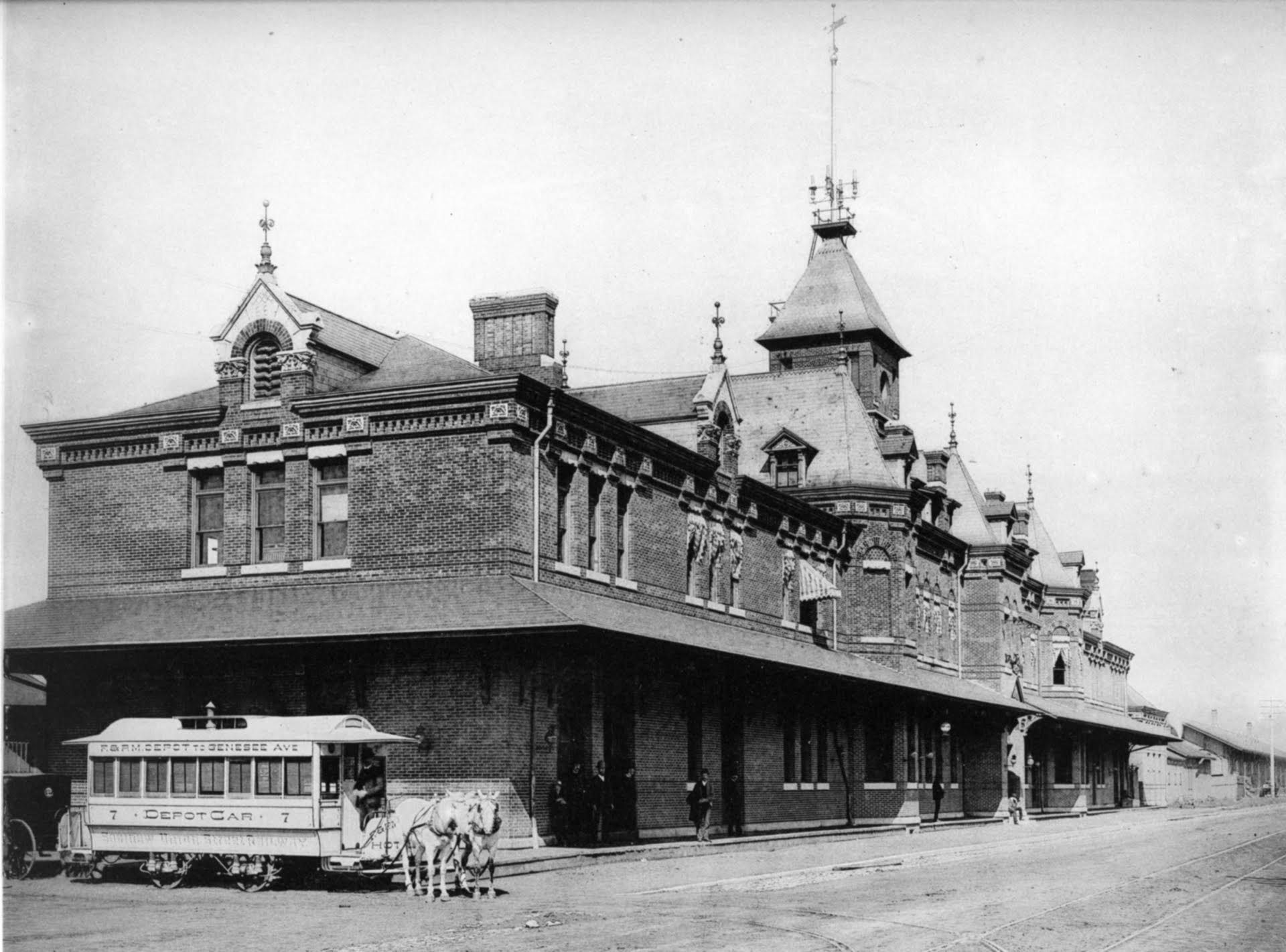
Pere Marquette Railroad Station in Saginaw Michigan 1888

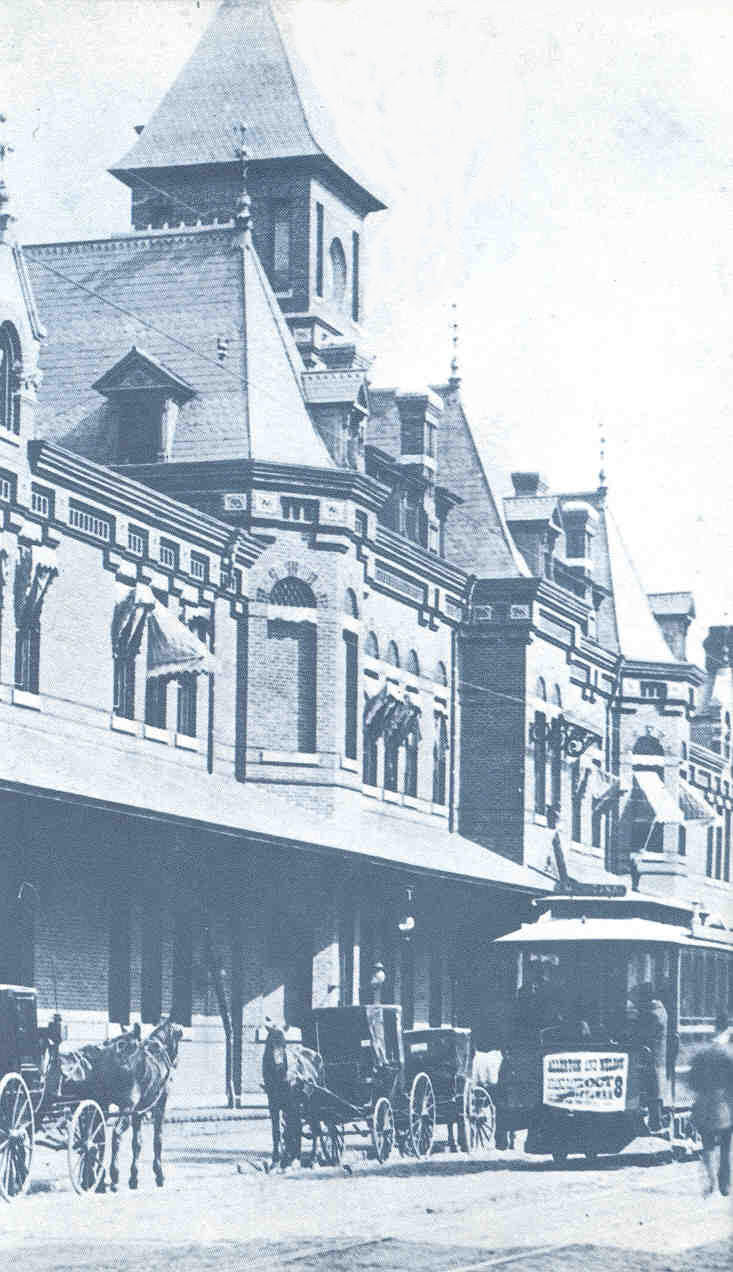
Pere Marquette Railroad Station 1890s

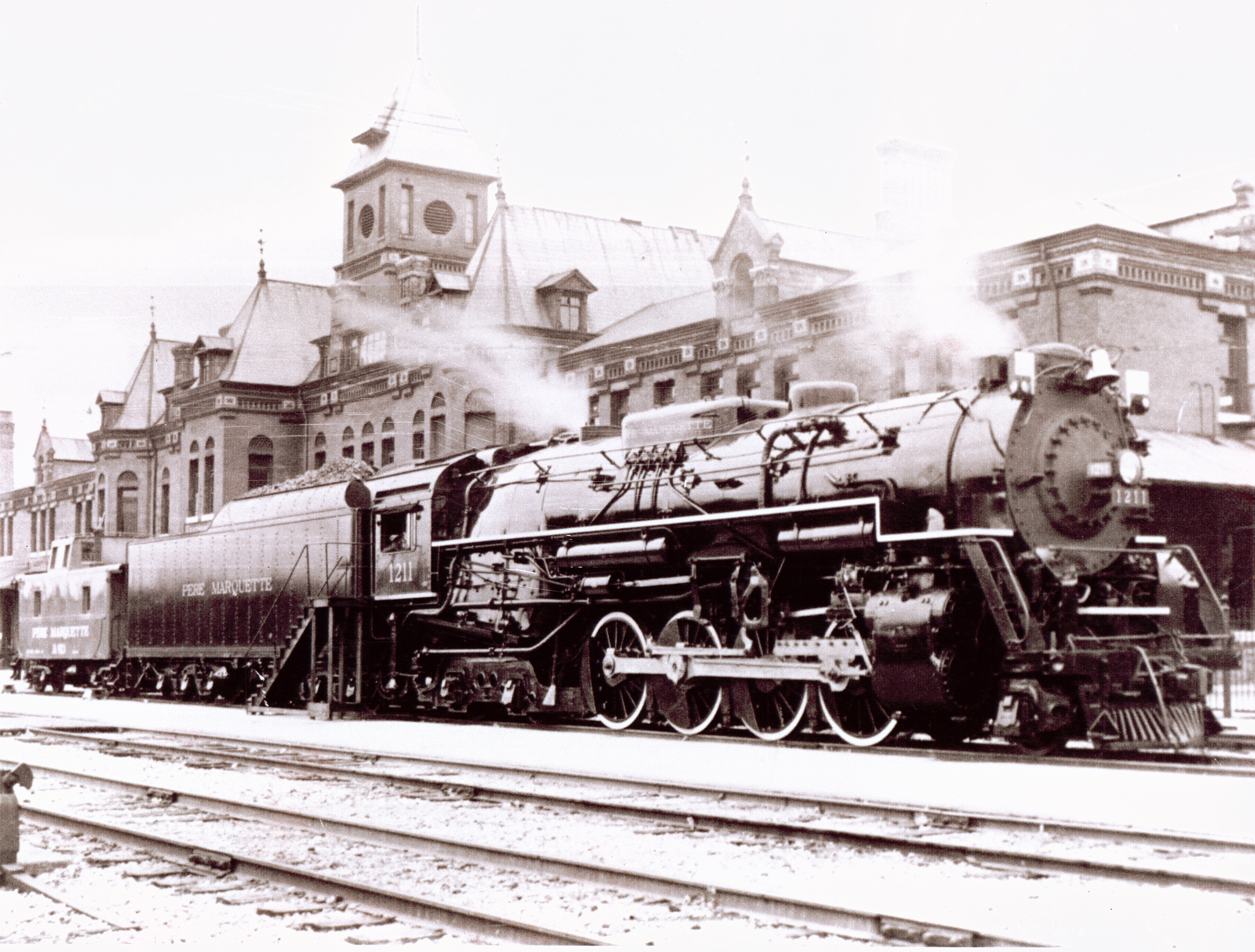
Pere Marquette Railroad Station and engine 1211

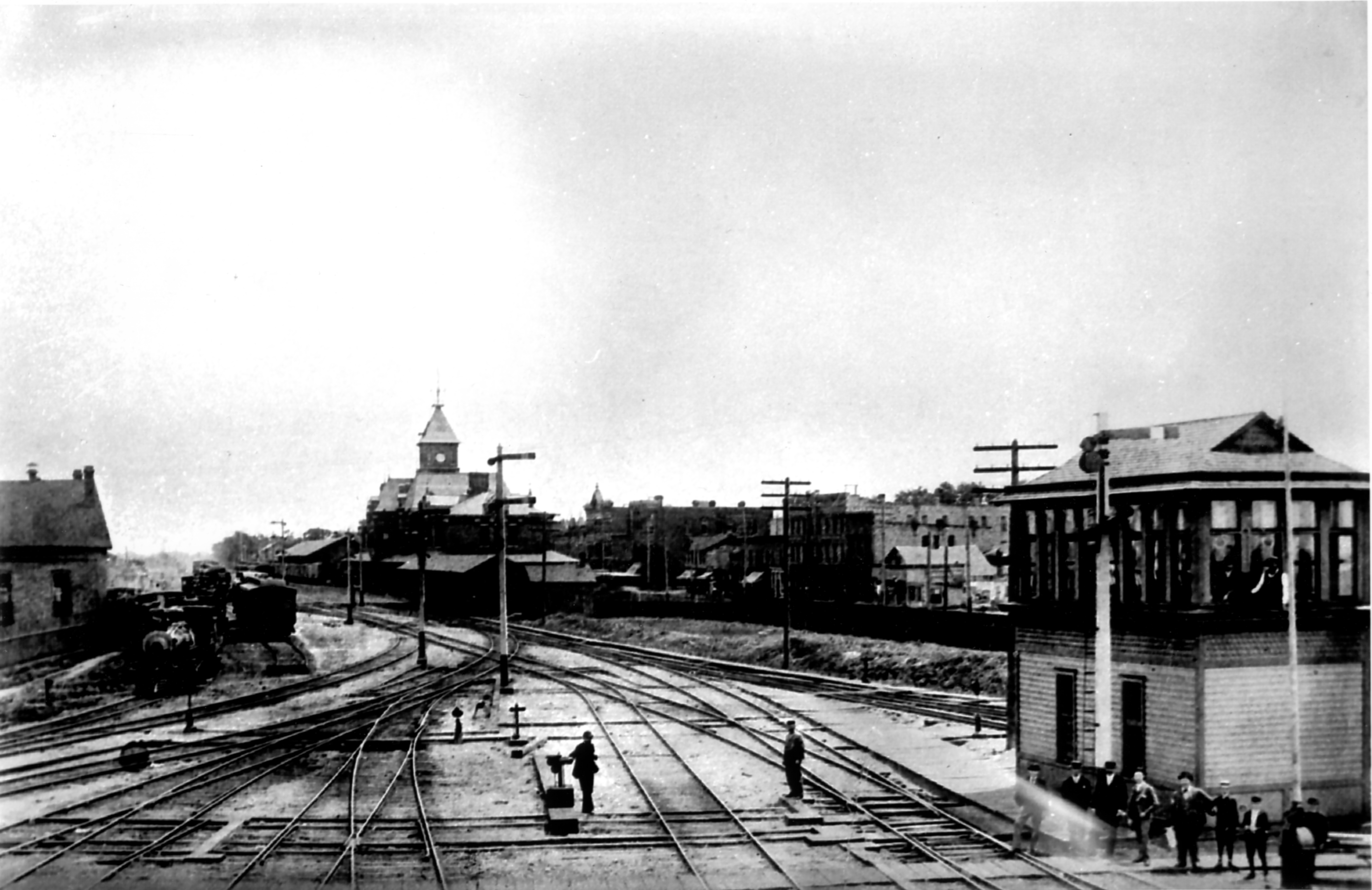
Pere Marquette Railroad station, tracks and round house 1880s.
