= Morley Companies =

Morley company

- Company type: Private
- Founded: 1863
- Founders: Anton Schmitz, George W. Morley, Edward W. Morley
- Headquarters: Saginaw, Michigan
- Area served: Worldwide
- Services: Business Process Outsourcing; Meetings & Incentives; Exhibits & Displays
- Number of employees: ~2,500
- Website: morleycompanies.com

Morley Companies is a United States corporation that provides business services to Fortune 500 and Global 100 clients; contact centers and back-office processing; meetings and incentives management; and exhibits and displays production. Originally founded as a hardware store in 1863, Morley is among the oldest surviving companies in the United States.

The company is headquartered in Saginaw, Michigan, and has associates working in offices in Detroit and Grand Blanc, Michigan; Fountain Valley and Irvine, California; Greenville, South Carolina; Palm Beach, Florida; Weehawken, New Jersey; and Wilton, Connecticut.

== History ==
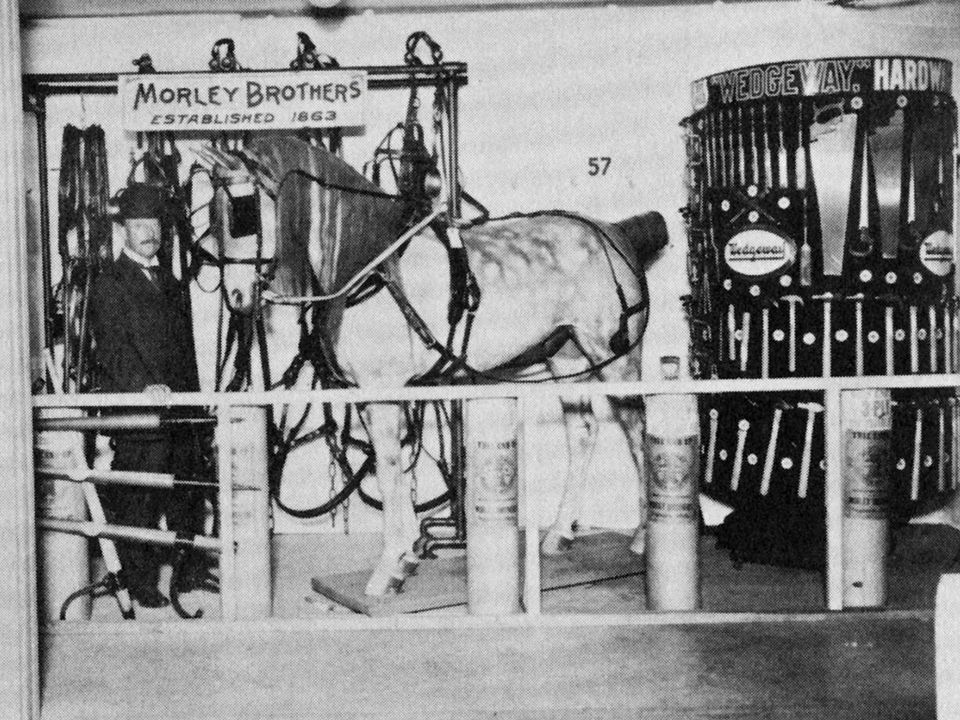
Morley Brothers window display showcasing horse and carriage supplies, 1915.

=== Beginnings ===
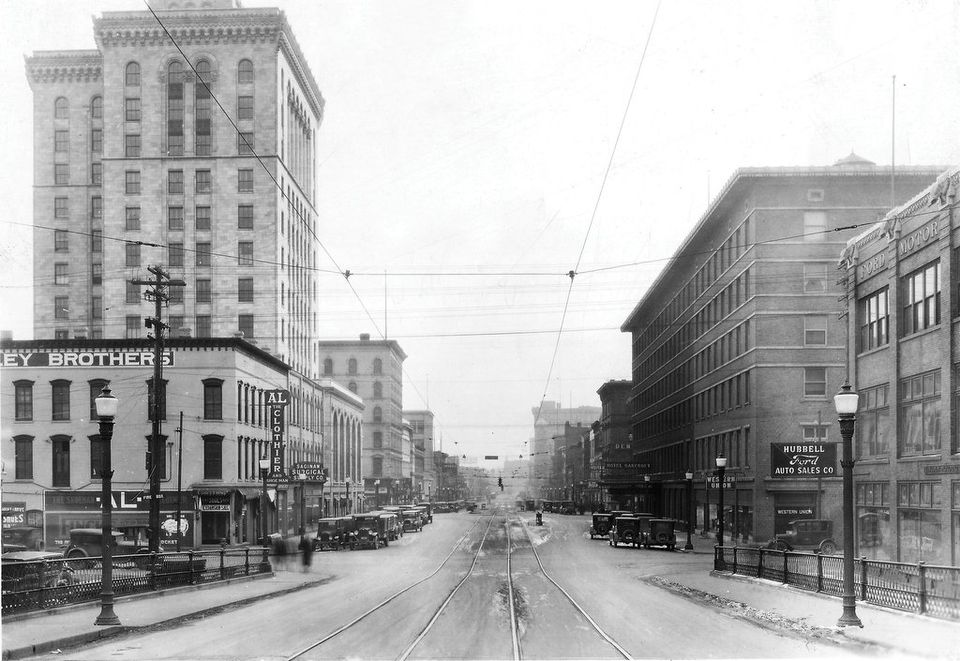
Morley Brothers Store, on Genesee in Saginaw looking east, early 1900s. Second National Bank, upper left, now FirstMerit, which Morley family members chartered in 1871.

Morley was founded as a hardware store by German immigrant Anton Schmitz in 1863. He opened his store as the city of Saginaw began to populate with the region's early lumber barons and entrepreneurs. As the population grew, business accelerated to the point where Schmitz could not handle the volume by himself. He placed an advertisement in the local newspapers seeking a business partner.

George W. Morley and Edward W. Morley, two brothers from Painesville, Ohio, descendants of New England Puritans, responded to Schmitz's advertisement and soon became his partners. The hardware store was renamed “Schmitz & Morley” in June 1863.

=== Morley Brothers ===
Within two years, and after an illness suffered by Schmitz, the Morley brothers bought out Anton Schmitz's half of the business and expanded to a much larger building on the Saginaw River, renaming the business “Morley Brothers.”

This new facility catered almost exclusively to lumber baron clientele. Due to the close proximity of the sawmills and the store being the northernmost hardware supplier at that time, Morley Brothers became one of the largest wholesalers in Michigan by 1880, and the second-largest hardware company in the United States by 1892. It also occupied one of the largest buildings in the world at the time, with four stories and more than 100,000 square feet of space. The company was incorporated on February 15, 1883, keeping Morley Brothers as its namesake and George W. Morley as the company's first president.

As Morley Brothers grew into a premier supplier of hardware in the country, the extended Morley family became involved in other ventures, including founding the Second National Bank (which would later become Citizens Bank, now part of FirstMerit Bank) as well as a portable housing partnership with the local Mershon Company. As a results of this partnership, Morley Brothers became the largest manufacturer of prefabricated homes in the United States.

In response to the lumber industry's decline at the turn of the century, the Morley Brothers offerings diversified toward retail goods. Morley Brothers became a distributor of sporting goods, home ware and other popular appliances, along with its original hardware selection. This move also allowed Morley Brothers to open two branches in Grand Rapids and Detroit, Michigan.

Despite the economic impact the Great Depression had on the country, Morley Brothers remained profitable. In February 1933, at the height of the Great Depression, Morley Brothers loaned the City of Saginaw $500,000 to help the city meet payroll and avoid bankruptcy.

From the 1940s-1960s, the company maintained strong, steady profits as it celebrated 100 years of business. During this time, Morley Brothers was also one of the largest wholesale hardware distributors in the nation. However, upon entering the 1970s, the company experienced losses for the first time. Causes for these setbacks included the 1973-75 recession as well as an increasing trend of direct distribution practices from manufacturer to consumer. Then-current Morley Brothers President and CEO Burrows Morley hired an outside consultant from New York City to provide additional business perspective, naming him company president in 1976. This marked the first time in Morley Brothers’ history that a member of the Morley family was not the company president, and proved to be an ineffective decision.

Control of the company soon transitioned to Louis J. Furlo, Sr. who was elected as president in 1978, with Burrows Morley remaining as chairman of the board. Furlo was a Morley Brothers employee who began in 1959 as a sales associate and quickly became the company's top salesperson. Under Furlo's leadership, the company returned to profitability. He eventually established the Incentive Division, a branch of Morley Brothers that provided merchandise and travel incentive programs to the nation's largest corporations.

=== Morley Incentives ===
As part of a restructuring plan, Furlo sold Morley Brothers to S&T Industries of Louisville, Kentucky, the nation's then largest wholesale hardware company. The following year, on July 1, 1982, Furlo and a group of investors purchased the Incentive Division from S&T Industries. The investor group included Burrows Morley, the sole member of the Morley family still holding a stake in the company, Jim Finkbeiner, the company's long time outside legal counsel and principal of Braun, Kendrick, Finkbeiner, Schafer and Murphy, John Heamans, Jim Wolohan the founder of Wolohan Lumber, and Bob Liggett, Jr., the founder of the Liggett Broadcasting Group.

Morley Brothers reestablished itself as Morley Incentives, specifically focusing on travel and merchandise incentive programs with Furlo as president and chief executive officer. In 1991, after 9 years of profitable operations, the Furlo family bought out the original investors and Paul Furlo joined the company.

=== Morley Companies, Inc. ===
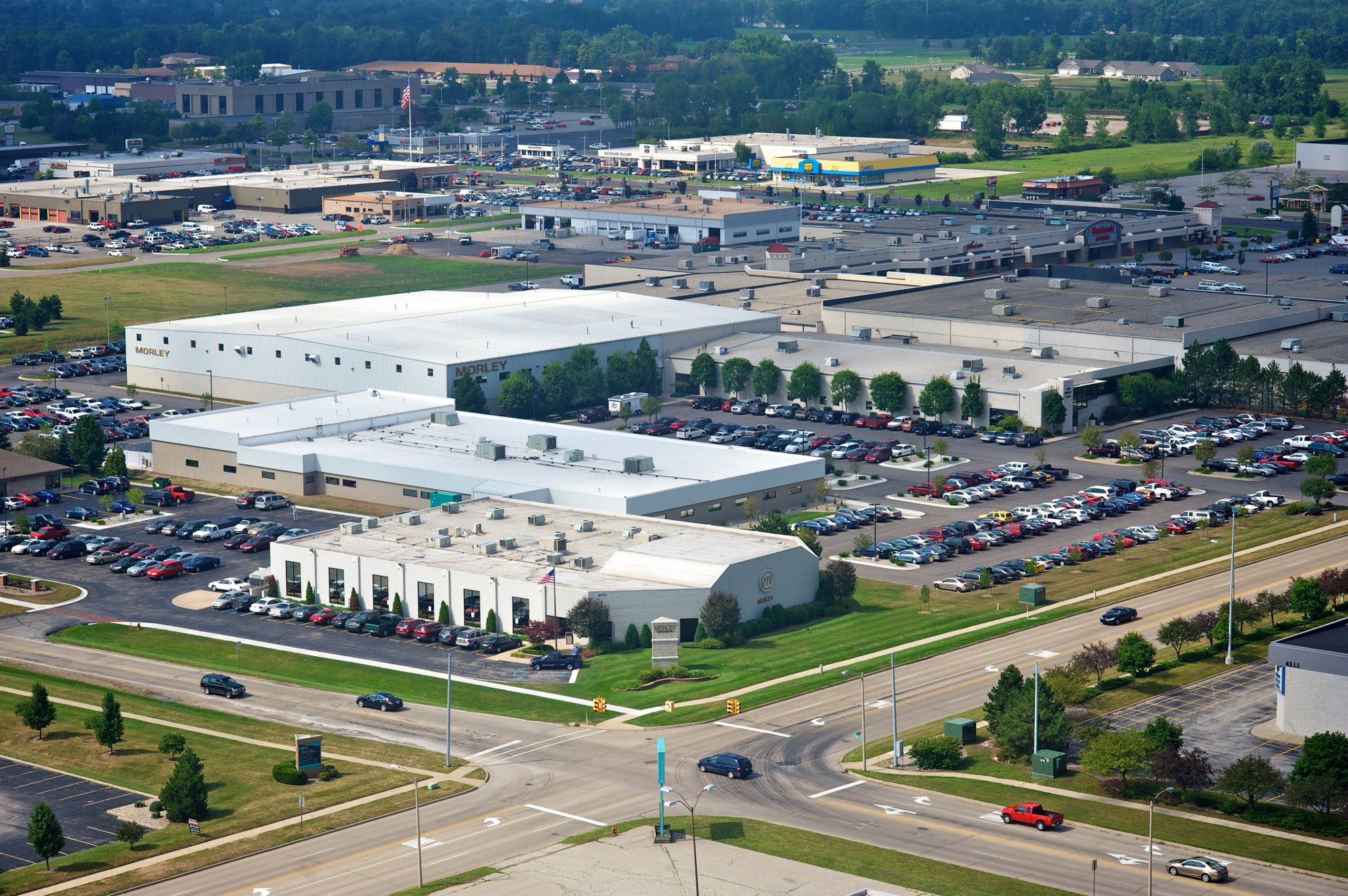
Aerial view of part of the Morley Companies campus in Saginaw, Michigan.

Shortly after its reorganization, Morley Incentives expanded into additional services that complimented incentive travel. Divisions such as business theater production, trade show services, and interactive services formed as the company continued to grow. Today, Morley is owned and operated by Furlo's three sons, Paul W. Furlo, Christopher J. Furlo, and Louis J. Furlo, Jr. The company has continued to grow, adding new jobs and winning employment awards including Experience Works Michigan Employer of the Year, Michigan Rehabilitation Services Champion Award and Saginaw Future Economic Excellence Award.

Between 2008 and 2011, Morley experienced rapid expansion and more than doubled in size, allowing the company to bring additional career opportunities to the Saginaw area. In 2012, it acquired the AT&T office complex in Saginaw Township, completing a multimillion-dollar investment in the facility and its technology. The company celebrated its sesquicentennial in 2013. A few years later, in 2016, Morley opened a new call center in Greenville, South Carolina. This $1.7 million investment created 270 new jobs.

As of 2018, Morley's Saginaw Township campuses occupy more than 400,000 square feet on 25 acres. Morley ranks number four of the top 40 primary employers in Saginaw, Michigan, and employs over 2,500 associates nationwide.

== See also ==
- Saginaw, Michigan
- Tri-Cities (Michigan)
