= World Business Chicago =

Nonprofit organization in Chicago, Illinois, US

- World Business Chicago
- Formation: 1999; 27 years ago
- Founder: Richard M. Daley
- Type: Economic development organization
- Legal status: Public-private partnership
- Headquarters: Chicago
- CEO: Phil Clement
- Chairperson: Brandon Johnson, Mayor of Chicago
- Website: www.worldbusinesschicago.com

World Business Chicago (WBC) is the official economic development organization for the City of Chicago. WBC is a public-private partnership and a 501(c)(3) nonprofit organization supported by funding from the City of Chicago, philanthropies, and the business community. In 2019, WBC reported $8.9 million in revenue. The stated mission of the organization is "to drive inclusive economic growth and job creation, support business, and promote Chicago as a leading global city."

== History ==
World Business Chicago began as a privately funded organization in 1999, formed by the Civic Committee of the Commercial Club and the Chicagoland Chamber of Commerce, with a focus on international marketing and corporate recruitment for Chicago. In 2000, WBC merged with the Chicago Partnership for Economic Development, an initiative founded by Mayor Richard M. Daley in 1999, and officially incorporated as the city's public-private economic development agency. The chairperson's role would be held by the Mayor of Chicago. Paul O'Connor, son of TV reporter Len O'Connor and a former journalist and aide of news writer and columnist Mike Royko, was appointed as the organization's first executive director.

Under O'Connor, WBC was responsible for several significant corporate relocations into the downtown Chicago area, including the relocation of Boeing headquarters from Seattle to Chicago in 2001. In 2007, O'Connor stepped down as WBC's executive director and was replaced by Rita Athas, a longtime aide to Mayor Daley. She subsequently oversaw several headquarters relocations, including Veolia Environment, MillerCoors, and Tempel Steel in 2008.

In 2009 and 2010, Athas also led WBC's efforts, along with the City of Chicago, to support the relocation of United Airlines' operational headquarters into Willis Tower. Though the move was billed as "one of Chicago's largest corporate relocations ever," it was controversial due to its use of $25 million in public tax increment financing (TIF) to incentivize the move, despite not creating any new jobs.

In 2011, Rahm Emanuel was inaugurated as Mayor of Chicago and appointed the new chairperson of WBC. He expanded the board of directors from 15 to 50 people, largely top business leaders for private and public companies in the Chicago area. He also appointed Michael Sacks, CEO of GCM Grosvenor, as WBC's first vice chairman. Under Emanuel's direction, WBC developed the Plan for Economic Growth and Jobs, which identified ten economic development strategies for the City of Chicago, including manufacturing, transportation and logistics, and entrepreneurship.

In early 2013, Athas announced her resignation as president of WBC. In June 2013, she was replaced by Jeff Malehorn, former president and CEO of GE Capital, to serve as CEO of WBC and lead the organization's efforts in support of the Plan for Economic Growth and Jobs. Between 2013 and 2014, WBC's revenue doubled from $4.6 million to $8.1 million, and in 2015, WBC's revenue grew to $9.9 million. In 2017, after allegations that he was abusing company resources and fostering a toxic workplace culture, Malehorn issued a formal apology to WBC staff. A few months later, he was removed as CEO and replaced by Andrea Zopp, former Deputy Mayor, Chief Neighborhood Officer, under Rahm Emanuel.

Under Zopp's leadership, WBC's expenses outpaced revenue year-over-year, even as revenue declined from $10.5 million in 2017 to $6.6 million in 2019. Despite these failings, she was named one of the "Most Powerful Women in Chicago Business" in 2018 by Crain's Chicago Business.

After Lori Lightfoot was elected mayor in April 2019, she replaced Rahm Emanuel as chairperson of WBC. In June 2019, she appointed Mellody Hobson, president and CEO of Ariel Investments, to serve as the new vice chair.

In 2020, Andrea Zopp announced her departure as CEO of WBC. Michael Fassnacht, the former CEO and president of FCB in Chicago, was initially named as interim CEO of WBC, accepting a token salary of $1 per year. In May 2021, he was officially instated as the organization's CEO.

In 2023 Brandon Johnson was elected mayor, replacing Lori Lightfoot as WBC chairperson. Brandon Johnson appointed Phil Clement as CEO of World Business Chicago in April of 2024.

== Chicago Sister Cities International ==
In 1956, at the direction of President Dwight D. Eisenhower, the United States began the sister city program as a means of cultural exchange between cities in different countries. The partnerships between cities were administered by the National League of Cities until 1967 and the official formation of Sister Cities International, a nonprofit citizen diplomacy network.

In 1960, Chicago formed its first Sister Cities agreement with Warsaw, Poland, and launched the Chicago Sister Cities International Program. In the 1970s and 1980s, the program added seven additional Sister Cities, and in 1990, Mayor Richard M. Daley officially established a volunteer board of directors for the organization. Chicago Sister Cities operated as an independent nonprofit organization until 2013, when it was officially merged with WBC.

In 2014 and 2017, Chicago Sister Cities International was named "Best Overall Program for Cities with Population Greater than 500,001" by Sister Cities International.

== Controversies ==
In 2011, the Inspector General of Chicago identified a conflict of interest that made it possible for WBC board members to utilize the organization as a means of gaining third-party verification for grants and subsidies. Three years later, WBC updated its ethics and conflict of interest rules.

In 2016, WBC sponsored a delegation of business executives, educators, and politicians for a visit to Rome, Italy. Private attendees of the delegation paid for the trip themselves, though Rahm Emanuel and other city hall staff had their costs paid by WBC. The organization was criticized for using its public funding from the City of Chicago to fund the trip.

In 2019, WBC received criticism for being used as an organization to shield mayoral advisors from abiding by the City of Chicago's rule that requires Chicago employees to live within city limits. Lisa Schneider-Fabes, then-president of the District 39 school board in nearby Wilmette, Illinois, where she also resided, served as a transition advisor to Lori Lightfoot. The day Lightfoot was sworn in as mayor, Schneider-Fabes was hired at World Business Chicago, where she continued to advise Lightfoot, including attending senior staff meetings, human resources interviews, and planning for major speeches in the mayor's office. She resigned from WBC in December 2019 after an Inspector General investigation into her role.

== Programs ==
- Blackstone Inclusive Entrepreneurship Challenge: Launched in 2017 to provide underserved entrepreneurs in Chicago greater access to resources and opportunities for growth by investing in local non-profits who scaled their programs. Supported by the Blackstone Charitable Foundation.
- Chicago Sister Cities International: The largest and most active sister cities organization in the United States.
- Chicago Venture Summit: An annual venture capital conference originally launched in 2014.
- ChicagoNEXT: WBC's innovation and venture strategy program, launched in 2012 by J.B. Pritzker and an independent council of more than 250 technology and business executives.
- ThinkChicago: A talent attraction and recruitment program for high school students considering or specializing in STEM-related fields. Since 2010, more than 3,000 students have participated in the program.
