= East Saginaw, Michigan =

Coordinates: 43.419°N 83.947°W

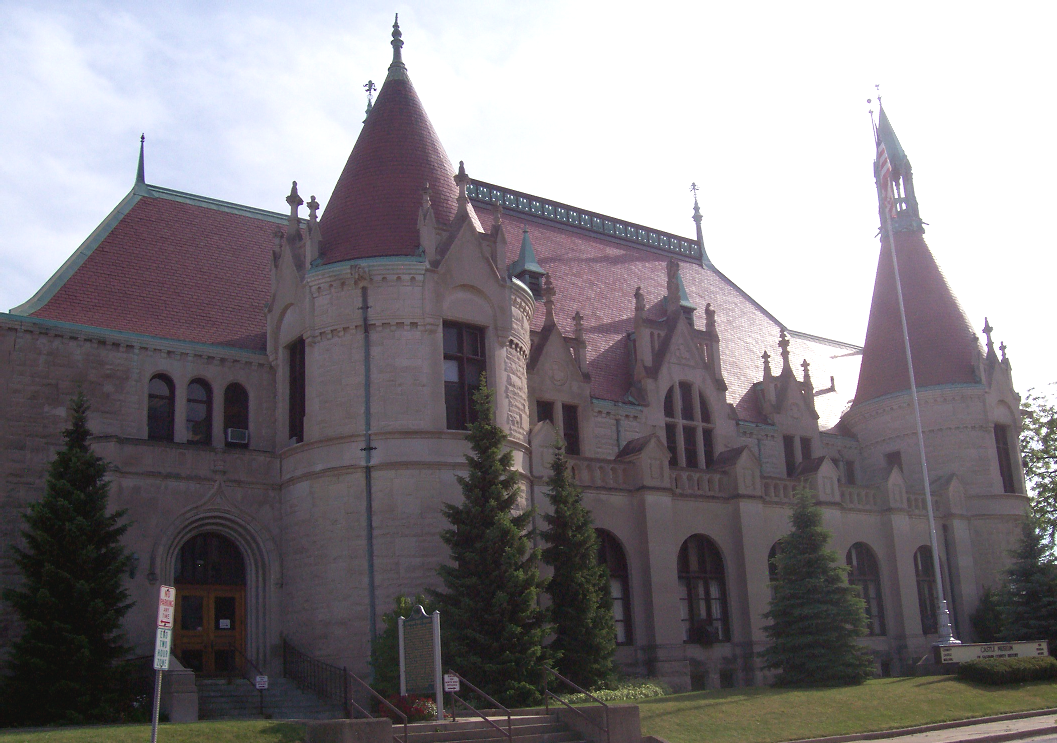
The former East Saginaw Post Office now is the site for the Castle Museum of Saginaw County History

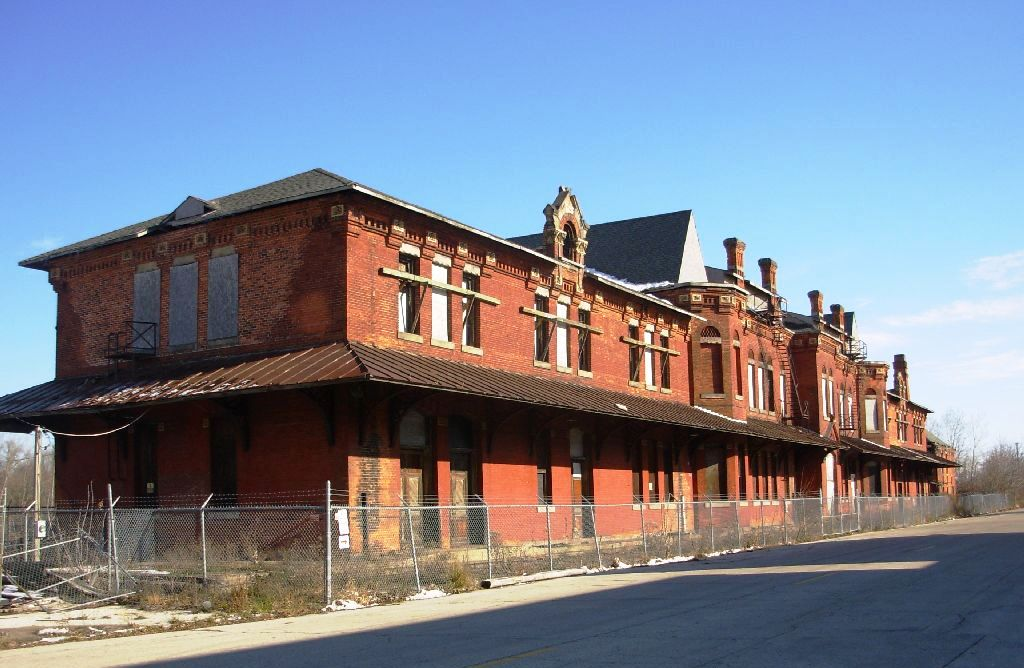
The site of the abandoned Flint & Pere Marquette Union Station, as it appeared in November 2008.

East Saginaw was a city in Saginaw County in the U.S. state of Michigan. It is now part of the city of Saginaw.

== History ==
Much of the area that later became East Saginaw was granted by treaty to James Reilly, the Métis son of fur trader Stephen V. R. Reilly and his Chippewa wife, Men-aw-cum-ego-qua, considered the Pocahontas of the village.

In 1824, the American Fur company erected a log cabin where the Bancroft house now stands and in 1826 it was tenanted by Captain Leon Snay, a celebrated French hunter and trapper. In 1849, Charles W. Grant was the first permanent American settler here and he encouraged the building of the first school-house near Snay's cabin in 1851.

There were three major fires in the history of East Saginaw. The first broke out in the kitchen of the Irving house on July 5, 1854, and spread throughout the village, destroying houses, mills, stores, and 3,000,000 feet (910,000 m) of lumber. In total $101,200 worth of damages, $80,000 of which was insured for $43,000. Two days prior, the first saw mill was destroyed with a $9,000 loss on the building in addition to 500,000 feet (150,000 m) of lumber valued at $6,000. The second fire started in the Jeffers’ block on Water street on May 7, 1861, and was too large by the time it was discovered. Twenty-three buildings and property valued at $55,000 were destroyed, insured for $17,500. Despite the village burning down twice, the settlers remained, stubbornly rebuilding it once again. The third fire started in the wholesale liquor store on Washington Street on January 26, 1865, and spread rapidly to every building for an aggregated $125,000 worth of damages.

East Saginaw was settled in 1850, and was incorporated as a village in 1855 and as a city in 1859. On June 2, 1889, the Michigan State Legislature passed an act to consolidate the cities of East Saginaw and Saginaw City, Michigan (the west side of the Saginaw River) to form the present-day city of Saginaw, which became effective with the election of officers for the consolidated city in March 1890.
