= Saginaw Bay Yacht Club =

S-orts organization

- Burgee
- Short name: SBYC
- Founded: 1894
- Location: 2313 Weadock Hwy, Essexville, MI 48732 United States
- Website: www.sbycmi.com

The Saginaw Bay Yacht Club is situated on the Eastern shore of the Saginaw River about a mile and a half (2.4 km) from Saginaw Bay and Lake Huron, Michigan.

== Establishment ==
Established as The Bay City Boat and Fishing Club in 1894, it is one of the oldest clubs on the Great Lakes. The name was changed to the Saginaw Bay Yacht Club in 1924. The present Clubhouse was built in 1960. The Club has a full-service restaurant and bar open year round. Guest docks are available and reciprocity is honored through the Inter-Lake Yachting Association and the American Registry of Yacht Clubs. Complete commercial marine facilities are located nearby.

== History ==
The Club was originally called the Bay City Boating and Fishing Club, and was founded in the summer of 1894 by William Jennison and 109 other enthusiastic charter members. A Clubhouse erected on pilings on the Saginaw River at the foot of Scheurmann Street in Essexville, Michigan; it opened in January 1895.

At the time, lumbering was king in the Saginaw Valley. Forty sawmills lined the banks of the Saginaw River from the mouth to above Bay City, and the pungent odors of freshly cut white pine and hemlock were ever present. Heavy traffic of steam tugs, tow barges leaving the mills with finished lumber, as well as incoming tugs towing log rafts or barges loaded with logs from lumbering areas, had to be a challenge as well as a hazard for the yachtsmen navigating the river. Sail and steamboats navigated their way up and down river. Activity slowed in 1898 after Ontario, Canada decreed that all timber cut on Crown lands must stay in Canada, cutting supplies for the mills significantly. Some mills along the Saginaw River closed and some moved further north.

The small Clubhouse was rapidly outgrown. With a shortage of mooring space, the Club members decided to move downriver and move their Clubhouse, plus add a new facility. Luckily, an ideal parcel of land with 480 feet (150 m) frontage on the river and 170 feet (52 m) deep approximately a mile from the mouth of the river was available. A membership meeting voted unanimously to proceed with plans, provided that the membership could be increased to 150. This was quickly accomplished.

The small Clubhouse was transported over the winter ice to the new site. Henry Webber, a building contractor, was hired to construct a new building alongside it. Completion date was set for July 1, 1904. An artist's rendition of the new Clubhouse appeared in the Bay City Tribune newspaper on May 5, 1904; the membership anticipated the best boating and social season ever. A grand opening of the beautiful 40' x 50' Victorian building was held on July 8, 1904.

A number of pilings were driven in the river in front of the Clubhouse and floats attached with chain for boat moorings. Occasionally, strong northerly storms scattered the fleet, sinking some boats at their moorings. Between 1952 and 1956, basins were dredged on the north and south sides of the Clubhouse, 600' (182m) long by 150' (46m) wide and eleven feet deep, eliminating further damage to the fleet.

The day came when the Club building was in dire need of repairs. The pilings it rested on had been shifted by the ice and were deteriorating. The floors were badly warped by previous flooding and the upper balcony had been closed for some time due to its poor condition.

In 1959, the old building was demolished, and a new Club constructed, featuring the latest in modern facilities and conveniences. The grand opening was held in conjunction with the Commodores' Ball in April 1960. The Saginaw Bay Yacht Club continues to grow and improve its facilities to maintain its reputation as one of the finest Clubs on the Great Lakes.

2026 is the 134th year of continuous operation of the Saginaw Bay Yacht Club on the shores of the Saginaw River.

== Club Officers ==
=== 2026 Flag Officers ===
- Commodore Richard Spitzer
- Vice Commodore Jerry Preston
- Rear Commodore Bob Klapish
- Treasurer Jason Reese
- Secretary Louise Vozniak
- Past Commodore Michael Bouckaert

=== 2026 Board of Directors ===
- Kim Dodge
- Ron Fitzmaurice
- Julie Humbert
- Carol Martin
- Ron View, Jr.
- Terry Bernelis
- Pat Frontjes
- Rachel Hougen
- Mark Meszler
- Don Sabourin

=== Club Management ===
- General manager - Jason (Jay) Wendt
- Business Manager - Bobbie Gamble

== Commodores ==
- 1895-96 W.F. Jennison
- 1897 K.M.R. Bradley
- 1898 Dr. H. Gilbert
- 1988 W.F. Jennison
- 1900 E.W. Moore
- 1906 J.B. Smalley
- 1907 Charles Coryell
- 1908 Charles Coryell
- 1909 H.L. Shaw
- 1910 G.M. Ames
- 1912 D.M. Jennison
- 1915 Charles Coryell
- 1918 Charles Coryell
- 1919 Otto E. Sovereign
- 1920 W.J. Sovereign
- 1921-22 Otto E. Sovereign
- 1923 M.D. Ealey
- 1924-25 Hoyt N. Smart
- 1926-27 Hubert S. Smith
- 1928 Charles Coryell
- 1929 W.H. Wallace
- 1930 Henry B. Smith, Jr.
- 1931-33 G.R. Moulthrop
- 1934-35 C.S. Moulthrop
- 1936-38 Harold H. Davis
- 1939-40 E.W. Bennett
- 1941 Otto E. Sovereign
- 1942 E.S. Cornwell
- 1943-44 Hoyt Hayes
- 1945 Merle Newkirk
- 1946 Philip M. Patterson
- 1947 Hugh H. Lee
- 1948-49 Eugene Swift
- 1950 Hoyt Hayes
- 1951-52 Harrison T. Plum
- 1953 Harold C. Spaulding
- 1954-55 Dr. Marshall Alcorn
- 1954-55 Dr. Kent Alcorn
- 1956-57 Dr. Richard S. Ryan
- 1958 Dr. Neal R. Moore
- 1959-60 James B. Quigley
- 1961-62 Floyd J. Nichols
- 1963 Willard O. Reed
- 1964 Kenneth Ferguson
- 1965 Lucius Greve
- 1966 A.J. Monohan (Honorary)
- 1967 Kenneth Mack
- 1969 Dr. Robert C. Hafford
- 1970 Burt C. Baum
- 1971 Arnold M. Krueger
- 1972 Carl F. Gladen
- 1973 E.E. Merrill
- 1974 Sherman R. O’Dell
- 1975 Sherwood J. Bradford
- 1976 Burrows Morley
- 1977 Jack Parker (Honorary)
- 1977-78 Norman D. Wyman
- 1979 Donald H. Sovey, Sr.
- 1980 Robert J. Gleffe
- 1981 Arnice J. Detzler
- 1982 Robert G. Koffmann
- 1983 John P. Slaskinski
- 1984 Ross Thompson
- 1985 Paul A. Drzyzga
- 1986 William H. Boutell
- 1987 Emory C. Sharp, Jr.
- 1988 Michael R. Berry
- 1989 William W. Allsopp
- 1990 James M. VanTiflin
- 1991 Frederick B. Fletcher
- 1992 Robert D. Kinney
- 1993 Donald R. Hill
- 1994 C. Thomas Howe
- 1995 Philip B. Wright
- 1996 Ronald L. Ruhland
- 1997 James N. Todoroff
- 1998 Gregory S. Hughey
- 1999 Robert L. Smith
- 2000 H. Paul Birch, Sr.
- 2001 Leon H. Dykhouse
- 2002 Matthew Kelly
- 2003 Craig Murchison
- 2004 Wayne Hilger
- 2005 Tari Detzler
- 2006 Jack Decker
- 2007 Greg Becker
- 2008 Paul Martin
- 2009 Steve Dicken
- 2010 David Cole
- 2011 John Michutka
- 2012 Donald Weaver
- 2013 Neil Oldenburg
- 2014 Craig Taunt
- 2015 William Fletcher
- 2016 Pamela Murchison
- 2017 Steve Goodnow
- 2018 Dr. Michael Holland
- 2019 John Kustuch
- 2020 Greg Vozniak
- 2021 Dave Klippert
- 2022 Richard Fletcher
- 2023-24 Dennis Bess
- 2025 Mike Bouckaert
- 2026 Richard Spitzer
