= Saginaw River Rear Range Light =

Lighthouse in Michigan, United States

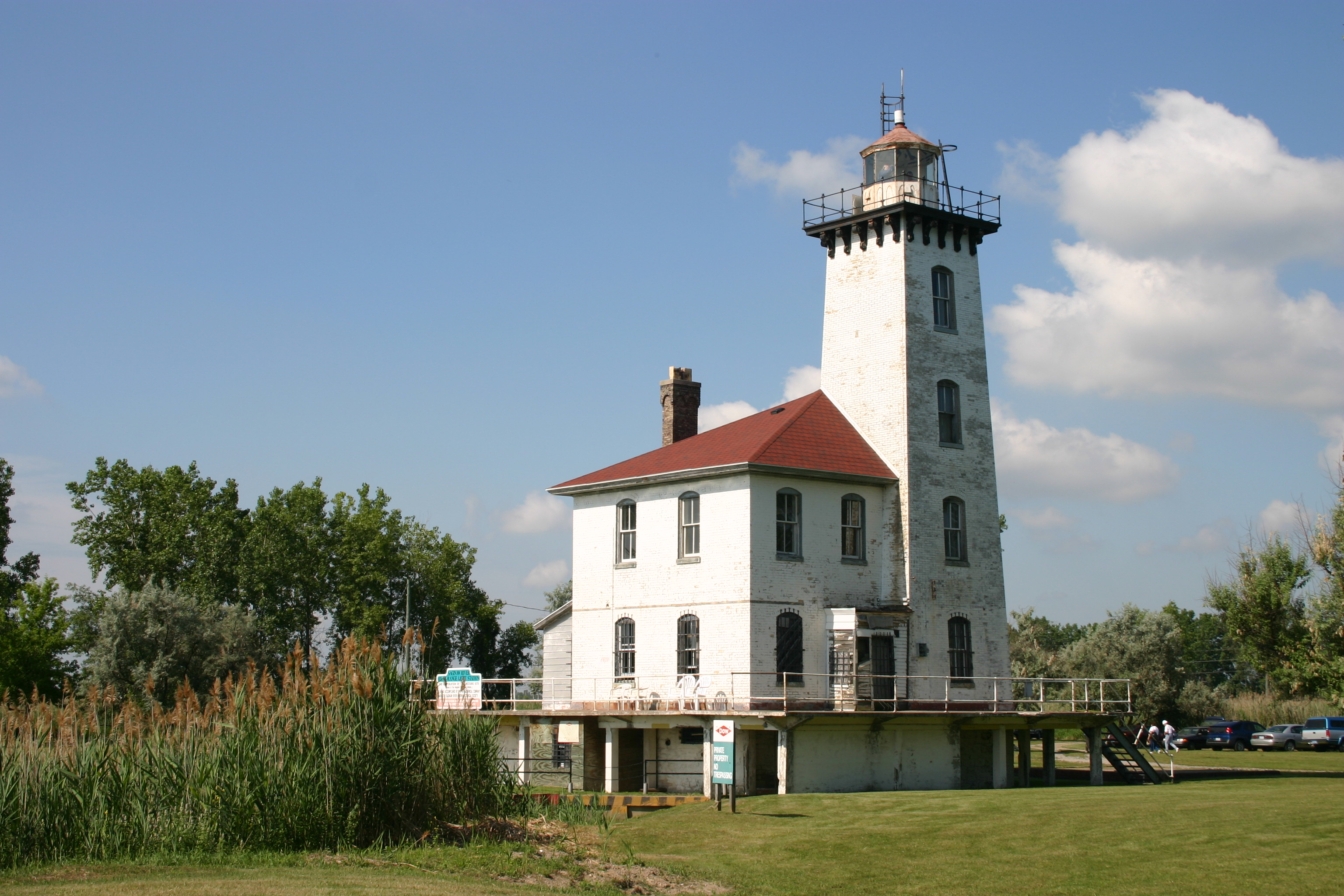
- Location: Bangor Township, Bay County, Michigan
- Coordinates: 43°38′7.8″N 83°51′2″W

Tower
- Constructed: 1839 to 1841
- Foundation: Timber piles/concrete/steel sheeting
- Construction: Cream City Brick covered with concrete
- Height: 59 feet (18 m)
- Shape: Square tapered
- Markings: white/black trim
- Heritage: National Register of Historic Places listed place

Light
- First lit: 1876
- Deactivated: 1960
- Focal height: 77 feet (23 m)
- Lens: 4th order Fresnel lens
- Range: 8.5 nautical miles (15.7 km; 9.8 mi)
- Saginaw River Light Station
- U.S. National Register of Historic Places
- Michigan State Historic Site
- Location: Coast Guard St., Bay City, Michigan
- Area: 1 acre (0.40 ha)
- Built: 1876
- Architect: Major Godfrey Weitzel
- MPS: U.S. Coast Guard Lighthouses and Light Stations on the Great Lakes TR
- NRHP reference No.: 84001373
- Added to NRHP: July 19, 1984

The first Saginaw River lighthouse was constructed from 1839 to 1841, in a period when large quantities of lumber were being harvested and shipped from the heart of Michigan via river and the Great Lakes to the East Coast of the United States via the Erie Canal and Hudson River. This connection to major eastern markets was critical to the development of central Michigan.

In 1867 the United States Corps of Engineers dredged the Saginaw River to enable passage by larger ships upriver. This change required replacing the first light, and in 1876 a pair of lighthouses were constructed in range light configuration to provide improved navigation. The front one was located on the west bank of the river and the rear range lighthouse was located south of the river mouth. It contained living quarters. In 1915, the two lighthouses were converted to electricity.

Closed since the 1970s, the rear range lighthouse was listed in 1984 on the National Register of Historic Places. Dow Chemical Company, which owned the surrounding property, purchased the lighthouse and site in 1986 and boarded it up. Since the turn of the 21st century, the lighthouse and site are being renovated by the Saginaw River Marine Historical Society for heritage tourism.

== History ==
European-American settlement along the Saginaw River began in the 1830s, which was critical to development in the region, as it was navigable inland. Construction of the Saginaw Bay Lighthouse, to mark the entrance to the river, was begun in July 1839 by Captain Stephen Wolverton. The project was completed under the direction of Levi Johnson of Cleveland, Ohio in the fall of 1841. In September 1841, the operations of the light were demonstrated. By this time, the lumber industry was growing rapidly, and much timber was shipped downriver and through the Great Lakes and New York state's Erie Canal to eastern markets.

In 1867, the United States Army Corps of Engineers dredged the Saginaw River channel so that larger vessels could navigate the river. When they were finished, the light was no longer well-positioned to allow boats navigation of the entrance. Funding requests, negotiations for land, and contractual issues delayed work to replace the light until 1876. That year a pair of lighthouses were erected in a range light configuration.

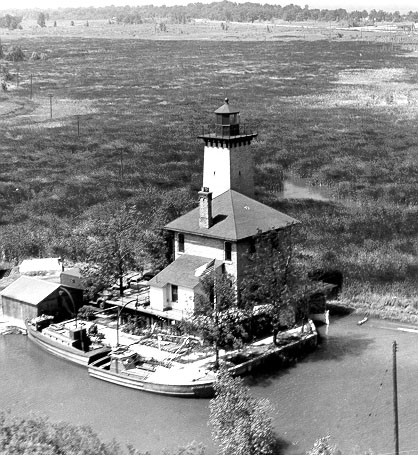
Undated USCG photo

The "front" range light was constructed on a square timber crib beside the western river bank, and took the form of a 34-foot (10 m) tall painted-white pyramid framework of timber similar in design to that being used for pierhead beacons throughout the district at the time. With its upper half sheathed, a small enclosed room was created beneath the gallery for the storage of oil and supplies, and in which the keeper could seek shelter while tending the light during inclement weather conditions. The gallery was surrounded with an iron safety railing and capped with a prefabricated octagonal cast iron lantern. Seated atop a cast iron pedestal within the lantern, the light's sparkling new, fixed white sixth-order Fresnel lens sat at a focal plane of 37 feet (11 m), sending its light 8 1/2 nautical miles (15.7 km; 9.8 mi) out into the bay.

The "rear" range light was constructed 2,300 feet (700 m) south of the mouth of the river. Eleventh district engineer Major Godfrey Weitzel's design for the combined rear range tower and dwelling was unique. A large elevated concrete base was to support a combined brick dwelling and tower. Because of swampy ground, timber piles had to be driven deep into the ground to provide a solid foundation on which timber forms for the concrete base could be erected and filled. Atop this concrete foundation, a square two-story Cream City brick Lighthouse keeper's dwelling 26 feet 6 inches (8.08 m) in plan was constructed. Integrated into the northwest corner of the dwelling, a tapered 53 feet (16 m)-tall square tower with double walls housed a set of prefabricated cast iron spiral stairs. Winding from the cellar to the lantern, these stairs also serve as the only means of access to the first and second floors by way of landings on each floor. Each was outfitted with tightly fitting arch-topped iron doors designed to stem the spread of fire between floors. A timber deck supported by timber columns encircled the dwelling at the first floor level, providing easy and dry access to all sides of the structure. The living quarters consisted of a kitchen, parlor and oil storage room on the first floor, and three bedrooms above. The tower was capped with a square iron gallery, supported by five cast iron corbels on each of its four sides. An octagonal cast iron lantern was installed at its center, with a fixed white fourth-order Fresnel lens placed at a focal plane of 61 feet.

The range lights were converted to electricity in 1915. The rear range light stayed active, and was used as the residence for men assigned to the associated US Coast Guard facility until the 1970s. At that time, the Coast Guard Station was moved across the river in order to have more space. The lighthouse remained empty until 1986. Dow Chemical Company, which owned the surrounding land, purchased the facility and boarded it up.

In 1999, the Saginaw River Marine Historical Society (SRMHS) approached Dow to collaborate to restore the lighthouse and open it to tourists. Renovation is being done by the SRMHS, with Lighthouse Friends helping raise funding. In 2002, the Saginaw River Marine Historical Society "acquired a historic locomotive-style range lens of the type used in the lighthouse between 1930 and 1960."

It is generally believed (but not well documented) that the Saginaw River lighthouse was the first place where range lights were installed. More details are available in the Wikipedia article on Lighthouses. According to Saginaw Future, the river still carries nearly 5 million tons of commerce in the 21st century. This lighthouse was listed in the National Register of Historic Places.

According to US Government publication, "The American Practical Navigator", Chapter 5: Range lights are light pairs that indicate a specific line of position when they are in line. The higher rear light is placed behind the front light. When the mariner sees the lights vertically in line, he is on the range line. If the front light appears left of the rear light, the observer is to the right of the range line; if the front appears to the right of the rear, the observer is left of the range line.
