= Saginaw Future =

Saginaw Future Inc.
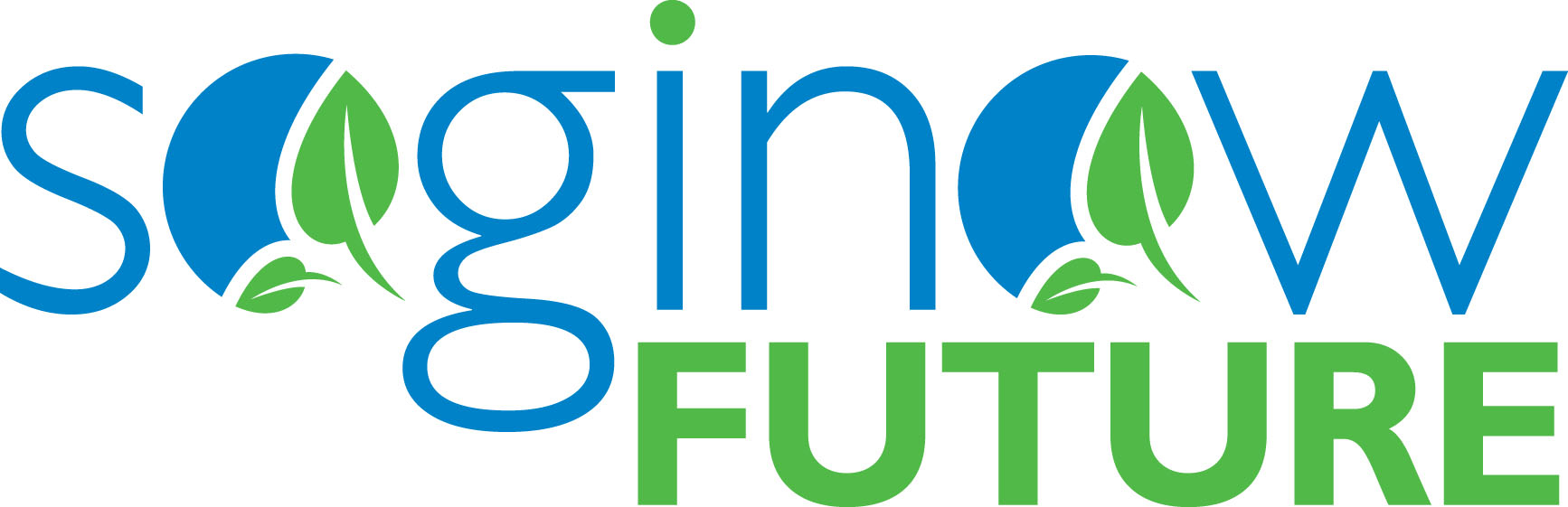
- Saginaw Future's logo

- Location of Saginaw County in Michigan
- Abbreviation: SFI
- Formation: 1992
- Type: Economic development organization
- Tax ID no.: 38-3021995
- Legal status: 501(c)(3)
- Region served: Saginaw County, Michigan
- President: JoAnn Crary
- Board of directors: Dan George, Chairman
- Revenue: US$729,193 (2014)
- Expenses: US$1,107,428 (2014)
- Website: saginawfuture.com

Saginaw Future Inc. (commonly referred to as Saginaw Future or SFI) is a private nonprofit economic development organization that encourages investments in Saginaw, Michigan. It is an Accredited Economic Development Organization (AEDO) by the International Economic Development Council (IEDC). While the organization is private, it is primarily funded by area governments.

== History ==
Saginaw Future was founded in 1992.

In May 2008, the organization and the Michigan Economic Development Corporation received the CoreNet Global Economic Development and Leadership Award for their collaborative efforts in securing a planned US$1 billion expansion by Hemlock Semiconductor Corporation in Saginaw County.

In May 2016, the City of Saginaw renewed a $102,500 per-year agreement, set to expire on December 30, 2020, to support the organization's efforts. While the city has had a relationship with the organization since its founding, the contract was expanded to include coordination of the Saginaw Downtown Development Authority.

== Structure ==
Saginaw Future is an alliance of businesses in the Saginaw area, the Saginaw County Chamber of Commerce, labor organizations, Saginaw area foundations, 15 local municipal governments, and the governments of Saginaw County and the City of Saginaw.

As of May 2016, the Saginaw city government contributes $102,500 annually, and the Saginaw county government contributes $200,000 annually to the organization.

On the staff side, Grace Smith serves as the economic development coordinator at Saginaw Future.

== Programs ==
Saginaw Future encourages economic investments in the Saginaw area through incentive programs, site allocation and development assistance, business advocacy, and community liaison assistance.
