= Henri Nouvel =

Former Jesuit Priest

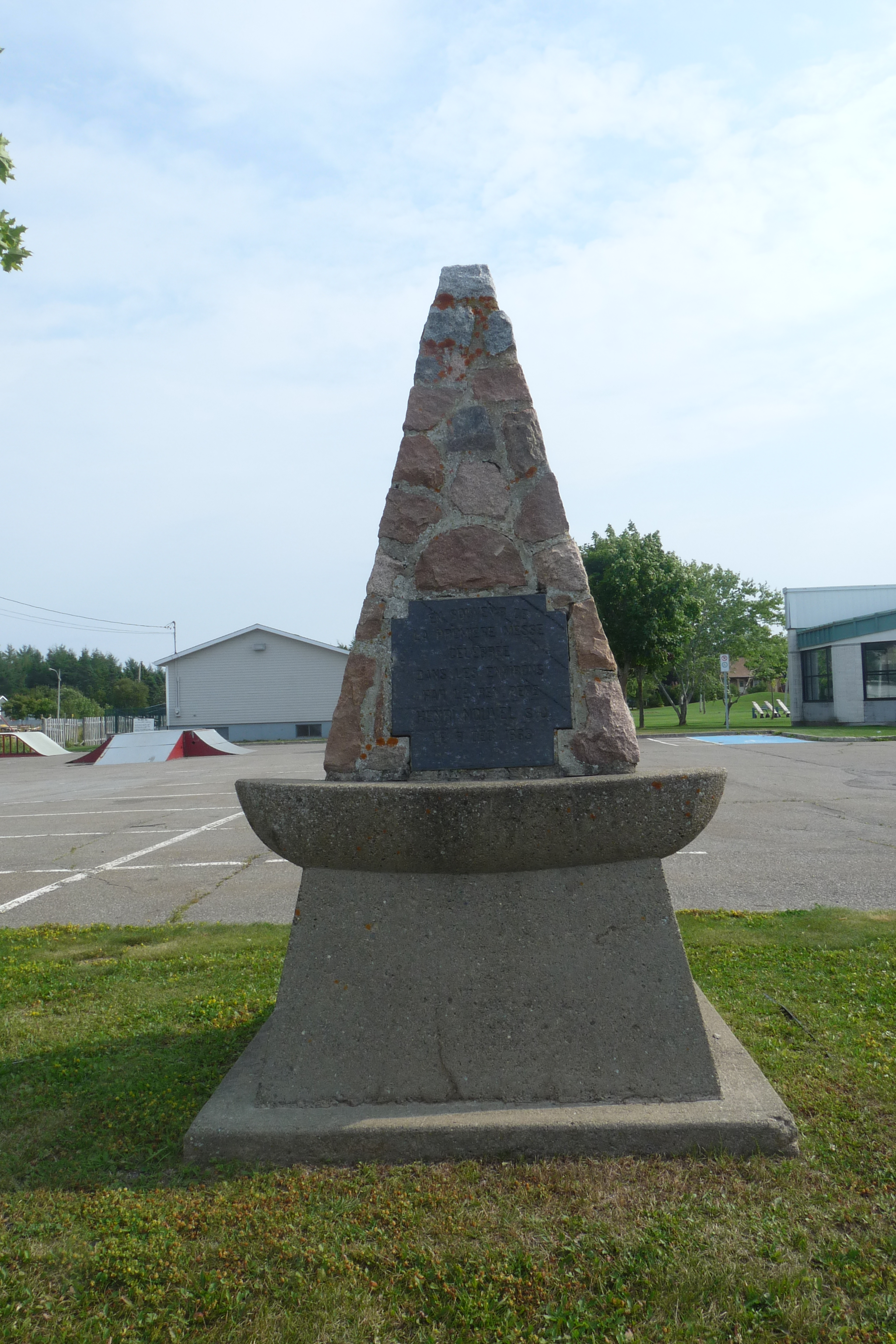
- Monument of the tricentenary of the mass celebrated by Henri Novel at Pointe-au-Pere in 1663

Personal details
- Born: 1621 Pezenas, Herault (France)
- Died: October 1701 (aged 79–80) St. Francis Xavier Mission near Baie des Puants
- Denomination: Jesuit
- Occupation: Missionary to Native American communities of New France

Henri Nouvel (1621 or 1624 in Pezenas, Herault (France) – between October 1701 and October 1702 at the St. Francis Xavier Mission near Baie des Puants) was a Jesuit priest who spent forty years as a missionary to Native American communities of New France. Nouvel was the first missionary on the north shore of the Saint Lawrence River; and he visited Saginaw 26 years before the French built a fort in Detroit (1701).

Nouvel was already a priest when he entered the Jesuit order in August 1648, and performed religious functions in France until 1662. He sailed for New France in 1662 as a missionary, arriving in Quebec in August 1662. During his first year in North America, he devoted himself to learning Indian languages. At the end of 1663, he established his first mission in the Rimouski area. Between 1664 and 1669, he did missionary work in the Montagnais territory at Lake Manicouagan.

In 1671, he was sent from to the Jesuit missions in the Great Lakes amongst the Odawa people. Nouvel made several trips to various Native American communities before being appointed superior of the Jesuit missions to the Ottawas in the region in 1672. He was "superior of the Otawa Missions", a position he would hold from 1672 to 1680 (with a two-year break in 1678–1679), and again from 1688 to 1695. In 1673, he informed Governor Louis de Buade de Frontenac about fur trading threats with the Indians. In 1674–75, he divided his time between Mission Sainte-Marie and St. Ignace Mission, but was stationed at St. Ignace in 1677 and 1678. He traveled between the Amikwa, Odawa, and Saginaw. He attended the burial of Father Jacques Marquette in 1677 at the St. Ignace Mission.

Between 1688 and 1695, during his second term as superior of the Outaouais mission, Nouvel intervened in the conflict between the Jesuit missionaries and Antoine Laumet de La Mothe, sieur de Cadillac over raids on Native American warriors and trafficking of Eau de vie. During most of his last twenty years of ministry, he lived at the mission of St. Francis Xavier Mission near Green Bay, where he died between late 1701 and October 1702.

Pointe-au-Père, Quebec (English: Father Point) is named after Henri Nouvel, who celebrated the first mass there in 1663.
