= Economic development organization =

An economic development organization (EDO) is an organization dedicated to the economic development of a region, be it a subnational area such as a town, city, county, province, or state; a whole nation; or transnational regions unified through economic integration. EDOs are typically government agencies, public-private partnerships, or non-governmental organizations (NGOs) working together with other actors to improve the regional economy they focus on (be it internal or external).

EDOs are sometimes confused with regional development organizations (RDOs) which have a similar focus but whose operations are often based on foreign aid or foreign assistance. EDOs may not even need to fund their operations, programs, and services as they might simply operate as a consortium rather than as an incorporation.

== Overview ==
Economic development has evolved into a professional industry of highly specialized practitioners. The practitioners have two key roles: one is to provide leadership in policy-making, and the other is to administer policy, programs, and projects. Economic development practitioners generally work in public offices on the state, regional, or municipal level, or in public–private partnerships organizations that may be partially funded by local, regional, state, or federal tax money. These economic development organizations function as individual entities and in some cases as departments of local governments. Their role is to seek out new economic opportunities and retain their existing business wealth.

There are numerous other organizations whose primary function is not economic development but which work in partnership with economic developers. They may include the news media, foundations, utilities, schools, health care providers, faith-based organizations, and colleges, universities, and other education or research institutions.

== Criticism ==
Economic development organizations have faced some criticism from industry groups and economists. As quasi-public entities, the leadership of economic development organizations often oversee large and complicated financial transactions without having the requisite skill level or oversight from competent third parties. Economic development organizations in the U.S., including ones in Montgomery County, Maryland and Warren County, Virginia have been embroiled in financial embezzlement or fiscal mismanagement scandals.
