= Saginaw River =

River in Michigan

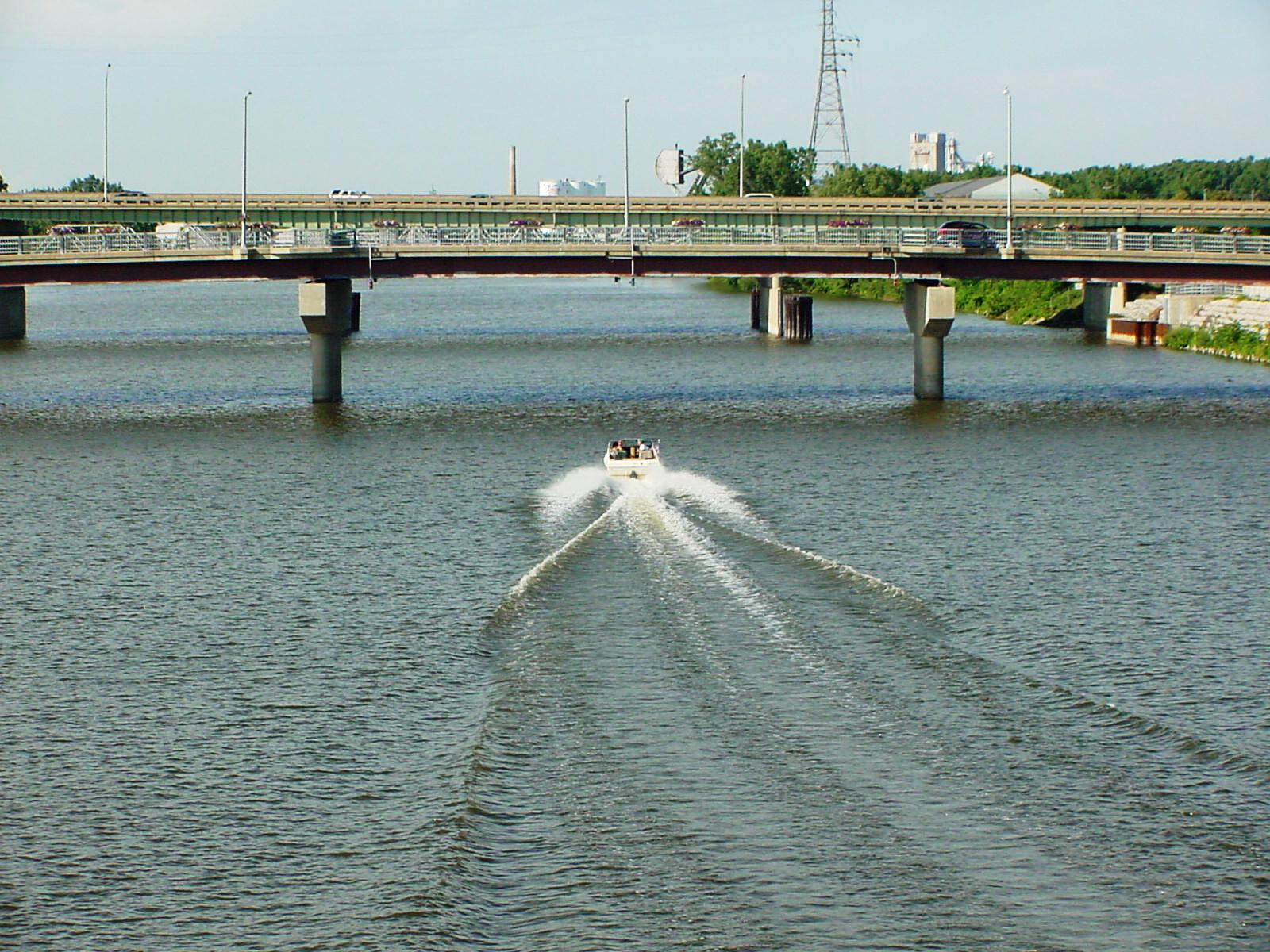

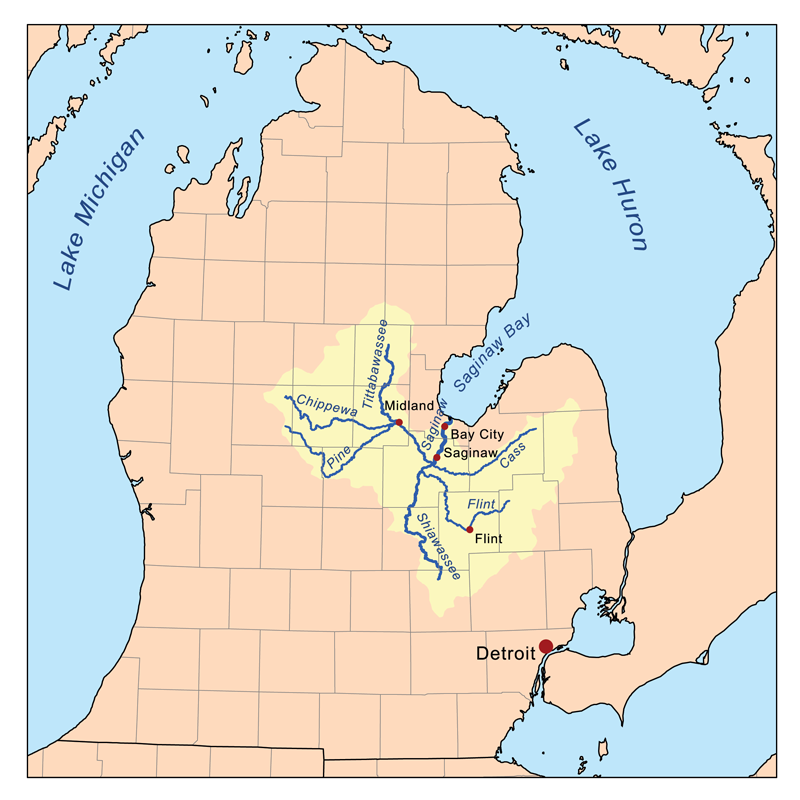
- Saginaw River watershed

Location
- Country: United States
- State: Michigan
- Counties: Saginaw County, Bay County
- Cities: Saginaw, Zilwaukee, Bay City, Essexville

Physical characteristics
- Source: confluence of Shiawassee River and Tittabawassee River
  - location: Saginaw
  - coordinates: 43.387248°N 83.9660845°W
  - elevation: 577 ft (176 m)
- Mouth: Saginaw Bay
  - location: boundary of Bangor and Hampton townships
  - coordinates: 43.6469667°N 83.8505319°W
  - elevation: 571 ft (174 m)
- Length: 22 mi (35 km)
- Basin size: 8,595 sq mi (22,260 km^{2})
- Discharge
  - location: mouth
  - average: 4,827 cubic feet per second (136.7 m^{3}/s) (estimate)

The Saginaw River is a 22.4-mile-long (36.0 km) river in the U.S. state of Michigan. It is formed by the confluence of the Tittabawassee and Shiawassee rivers southwest of Saginaw. It flows northward into the Saginaw Bay of Lake Huron, passing through the cities of Saginaw and Bay City, both of which developed around it in the 19th century. The watershed area is 8,595 square miles (22,260 km^{2}). At its mouth, the river's estimated average discharge is 4,827 cubic feet per second (136.7 m^{3}/s).

The river is an important shipping route for Mid-Michigan, passing through the cities of Saginaw and Bay City. It is one of Michigan's few inland navigable rivers. The Saginaw River Rear Range Light, one of a pair of lighthouses built in 1876 to improve navigation, was listed on the National Register of Historic Places in 1984. Since the turn of the 21st century, it is being renovated.

== History ==
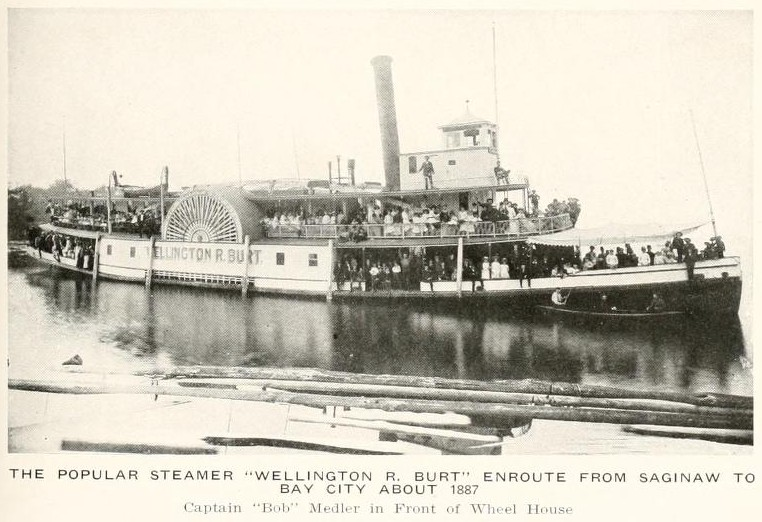
Wellington R. Burt steamer, 1887

The Saginaw River was used for fishing and as a transportation route by canoe by indigenous peoples for thousands of years prior to European colonization. From the 18th century, fur traders and trappers rendezvoused at a post at the mouth or traveled along the river and its tributaries to trade with the Ojibwe tribes of the region for European and American manufactured goods.

As towns developed along the river, it supported additional travel inland, as well as powering the operation of sawmills and later factories. The first lighthouse was completed in 1841, and a pair of lighthouses were built in range configuration in 1876. They were converted to electricity in 1915. The Saginaw River Rear Range Light was listed on the National Register of Historic Places in 1984. Since the turn of the 21st century, it is being renovated.

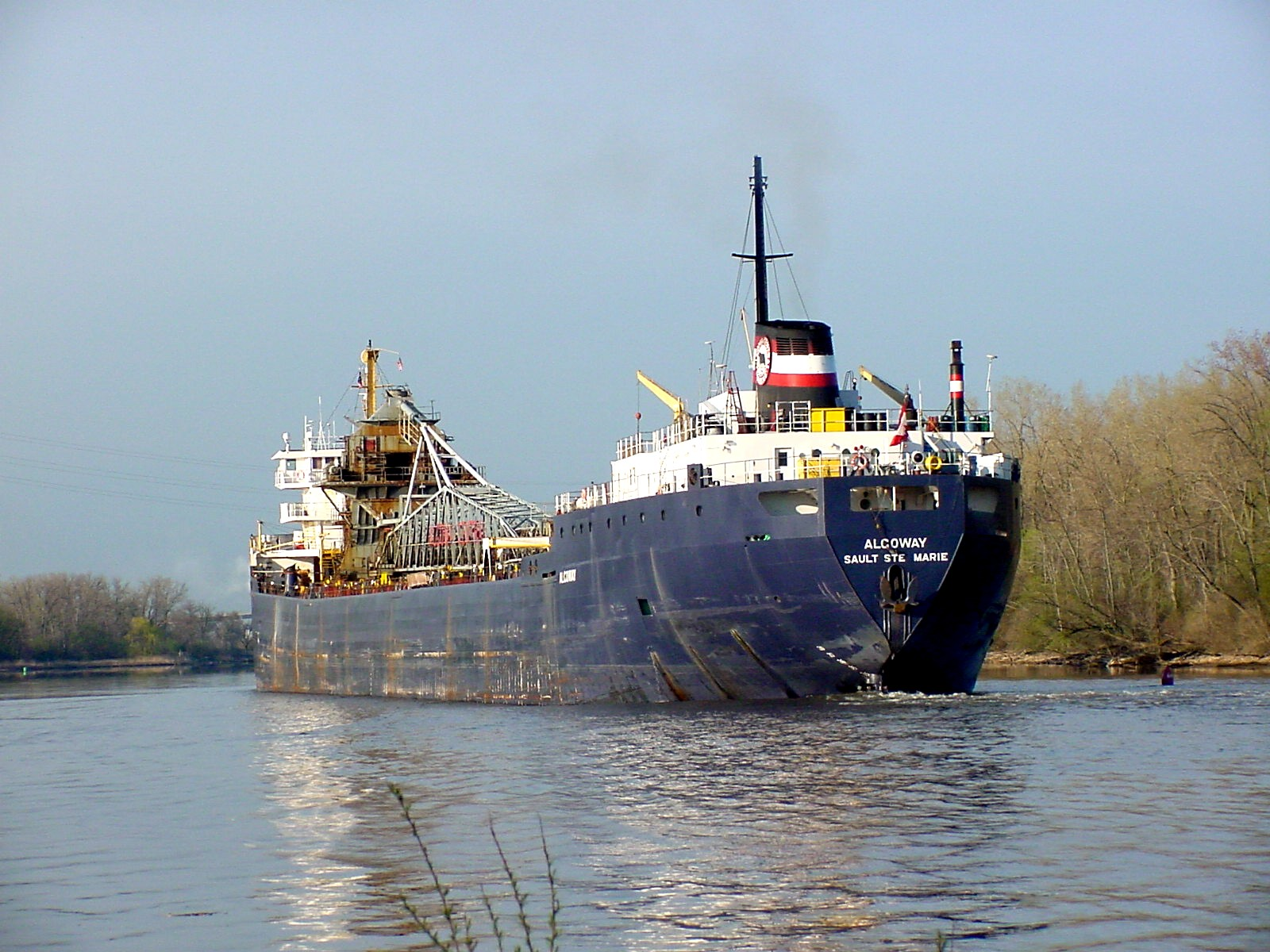
The Saginaw River supports transport of 4.6 million tons of river commerce annually.

In the late 19th century, steamers like the Wellington R. Burt carried passengers between the major cities of Saginaw and Bay City, as well as to other ports along the Great Lakes. The Saginaw River has continued to be used as a major route for trade, carrying shipping into and out of the region. According to Saginaw Future, the river carries 4.6 million tons of commerce annually.

Other industries developed, with both General Motors and Dow Chemical Company basing major operations from the early 20th century at sites along the river. These generated many industrial jobs for the area economy but both companies have gone through restructuring. New industries in the region have included advanced manufacturing such as Nexteer, medical technology, professional services, renewable energy, and agribusiness.

== Recreational activities ==
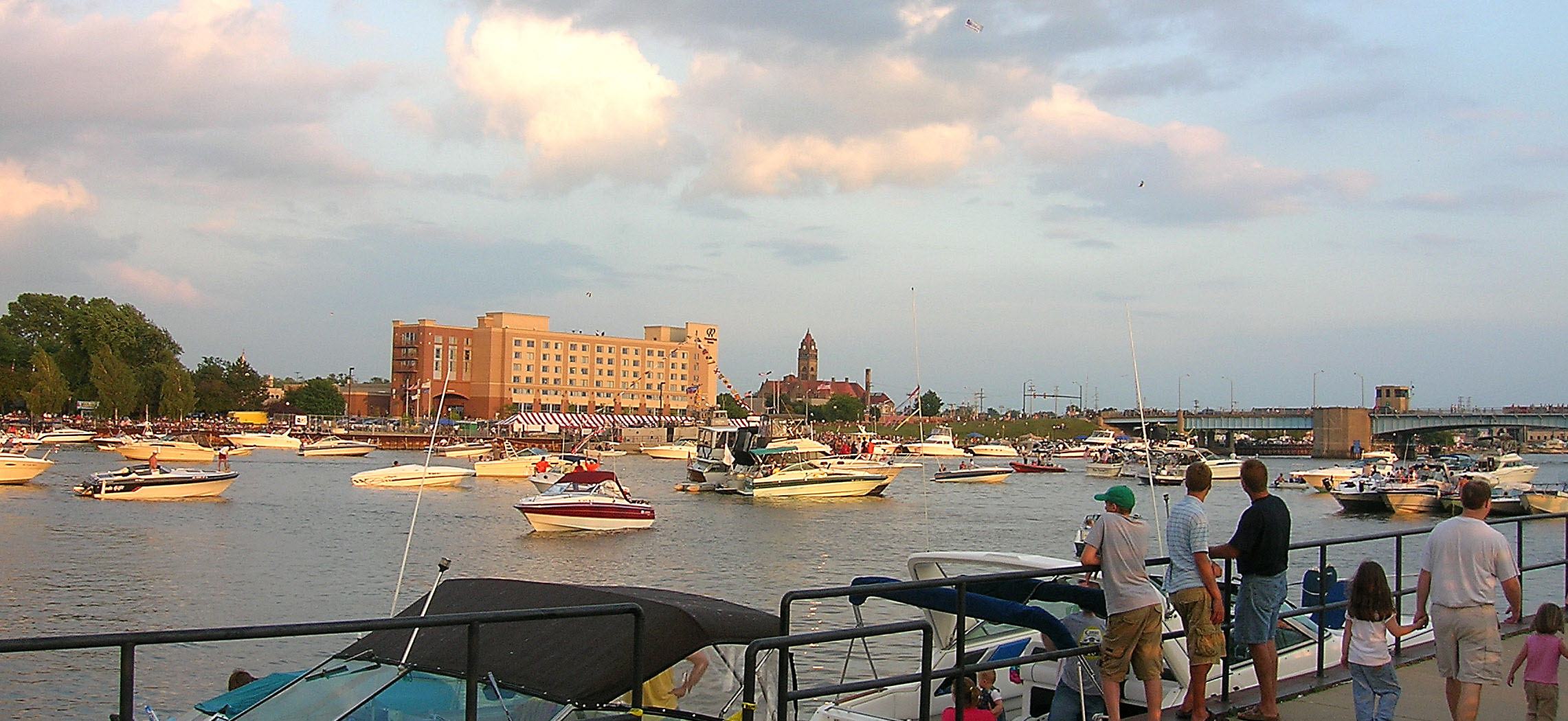
Saginaw River during the Bay City Fireworks Festival

For decades, the Saginaw River has been reclaimed for recreational use and the cities have been re-establishing ties to the river for residents. A three-mile, hard-surfaced RiverWalk, great for hiking, biking or easy strolls, was built along the riverbanks in downtown Saginaw and Bay City. The Saginaw Bay Yacht Club, established in 1894, is located near the mouth of the Saginaw River and supports regular sailing races and related events. The river is also popular with boaters who use motors.

Sports fishermen are active and many enjoy the annual Shiver on the River walleye ice fishing contest. Each winter, trophy-sized fish are taken by fishing through holes in the river ice. Another fishing season is observed in early spring.

Hundreds of thousands of attendees flock to the riverbanks for annual festivals such as the River Roar speed boat races, Tall Ship Celebrations and two of the largest fireworks displays in the Midwest. In 2012, the largest-ever fireworks display in Michigan was hosted on the Saginaw River in Bay City, with 50,000 mortars, and lasting 50 minutes. It celebrated the 50th anniversary of the Bay City Fireworks Festival.

== Clean-up projects ==
The region around the Saginaw Bay and River encompasses the largest contiguous freshwater coastal wetland in America. Because of industrialization and development of population since the 19th century, the Saginaw River and its watershed have been polluted with various wastes discharged into the river and its tributaries. Since the 1970s, federal and state laws have been passed to regulate waste and establish preventive programs. Historically the Dow Chemical Company, with a plant at Midland, Michigan; General Motors, and the cities of Bay City, and the Saginaw have contributed to the release of dioxins into the Saginaw River.

In 1994 the state and federal governments and the Saginaw Chippewa Indian Tribe sued General Motors and the cities of Saginaw and Bay City for allegedly dumping tons of polychlorinated biphenyls (PCBs), into the Saginaw River. General Motors and the cities of Bay City and Saginaw agreed to a $28.22 million settlement on November 23, 1998, in what resulted from Michigan's largest natural resources lawsuit. At the time, it was considered possibly the second-largest environmental settlement in United States history. Dredging of contaminated silt from the Saginaw River was expected to start in summer of 1999.

Environmental clean-up work has continued on the Saginaw River, its tributary Tittabawassee River, and Saginaw Bay. On January 23, 2010, the US Environmental Protection Agency and Dow Chemical reached an administrative settlement for interim control measures, reimbursement of some federal work, and cleanup of floodplain soils in these areas, in association with work to be directed by EPA.
