= National Register of Historic Places listings in Bay County, Michigan =

The following is a list of Registered Historic Places in Bay County, Michigan.
This National Park Service list is complete through NPS recent listings posted September 26, 2025.

	Name on the Register	Image	Date listed	Location	City or town	Description
1	Bay City Downtown Historic District	Bay City Downtown Historic District	September 12, 1985 (#85002338)	Roughly bounded by Saginaw River, Second and Adam Sts. and Center Ave. 43°36′00″N 83°53′18″W	Bay City	
2	Bay City Masonic Temple	Bay City Masonic Temple	May 3, 2016 (#16000216)	700 N. Madison Ave. 43°35′49″N 83°53′04″W	Bay City	
3	Bay County Building	Bay County Building	March 25, 1982 (#82002825)	515 Center Ave. 43°35′54″N 83°53′06″W	Bay City	
4	Center Avenue Neighborhood Residential District	Center Avenue Neighborhood Residential District	April 22, 1982 (#82002826)	Roughly bounded by N. Madison, Green, & Center Aves., 4th, 5th, 6th, & 10th Sts., Carroll Rd. & Nurmi Dr. 43°35′48″N 83°52′14″W	Bay City	The original 1982 district was roughly bounded by Green and N. Madison Aves, 5th and 6th Sts. The boundaries were increased on December 12, 2012 (refnum 12001027) to those noted, which encompass the original boundaries.
5	City Hall	City Hall	July 18, 1975 (#75000936)	301 Washington St. 43°35′36″N 83°53′21″W	Bay City	
6	James Clements Airport Administration Building	James Clements Airport Administration Building	November 22, 1982 (#82000494)	614 S. River Rd. 43°32′52″N 83°53′31″W	Bay City	
7	USS Edson (DD-946)	USS Edson (DD-946)	June 21, 1990 (#90000333)	Saginaw River; 43°36′50″N 83°52′10″W	Bay City	
8	Elm Lawn Cemetery	Elm Lawn Cemetery	May 18, 2006 (#06000404)	300 Ridge Rd. 43°35′19″N 83°51′29″W	Bay City	
9	Fletcher Site	Fletcher Site	April 16, 1971 (#71001018)	Btw Marquette Ave. and the Saginaw River; 43°36′30″N 83°53′30″W	Bay City	
10	Mercy Hospital and Elizabeth McDowell Bialy Memorial House	Mercy Hospital and Elizabeth McDowell Bialy Memorial House	April 22, 1980 (#80001848)	15th and Water Sts. 43°35′11″N 83°53′34″W	Bay City	
11	Midland Street Commercial District	Midland Street Commercial District	April 22, 1982 (#82002827)	Roughly bounded by John, Vermont, Catherine and Litchfield Sts. 43°36′06″N 83°53′57″W	Bay City	
12	Odd Fellows Valley Lodge No. 189 Building	Odd Fellows Valley Lodge No. 189 Building	July 19, 2010 (#10000474)	1900 Broadway Ave. 43°34′11″N 83°53′38″W	Bay City	
13	Pere Marquette Railroad Depot, Bay City Station	Pere Marquette Railroad Depot, Bay City Station	April 15, 1982 (#82002828)	919 Boutell Pl. 43°36′00″N 83°53′06″W	Bay City	
14	Sage Library	Sage Library	December 31, 1979 (#79001149)	100 E. Midland St. 43°36′06″N 83°54′17″W	Bay City	
15	Saginaw River Light Station	Saginaw River Light Station	July 19, 1984 (#84001373)	Coast Guard St. 43°38′08″N 83°51′01″W	Bay City	
16	Tromble House	Tromble House	January 25, 1973 (#73000943)	Veterans Memorial Park; 43°35′28″N 83°53′59″W	Bay City	

== Former listings ==
	Name on the Register	Image	Date listed	Date removed	Location	City or town	Description
1	Bay City Bascule Bridge	Bay City Bascule Bridge	November 30, 1999 (#99001465)	April 20, 2015	M-13/M-84 over East Channel of Saginaw River; 43°34′46″N 83°53′59″W	Bay City	

== See also ==
- List of Michigan State Historic Sites in Bay County, Michigan
- National Register of Historic Places listings in Michigan
- Listings in neighboring counties: Arenac, Midland, Saginaw, Tuscola
