= List of Michigan State Historic Sites in Bay County =

Location of Bay County in Michigan

The following is a list of Michigan State Historic Sites in Bay County, Michigan. Sites marked with a dagger (†) are also listed on the National Register of Historic Places in Bay County, Michigan.

== Current listings ==
Name	Image	Location	City	Listing date
Bangor Township District School No. 1		NW corner of Old Kawkawlin and Wheeler roads	Bay City (Kawkawlin vicinity)	November 21, 1991
Bauer House		1980 Hotchkiss Road	Frankenlust Township	July 17, 1981
Bay City Armory		321 Washington Avenue	Bay City	April 25, 1988
Bay City Boating and Fishing Club Commemorative Designation		2313 Weadock Highway	Essexville	June 20, 1994
Bay City Informational Designation		Sixth Street, Wenonah Park	Bay City	July 19, 1956
Bay City YMCA Informational Designation		111 North Madison Avenue	Bay City	August 20, 1992
Bay City Sawdust Strike Informational Designation		Water and Sixth streets	Bay City	May 15, 1987
Beet Sugar Industry Informational Designation		2 miles south of Bay City on M-13, in Veteran's Park	Bay City vicinity	January 19, 1957
Center Avenue Neighborhood Residential District†		Roughly bounded by Green and North Madison avenues, Fifth and Sixth streets	Bay City	December 14, 1976
Calvin and Elizabeth Chillson House		300 Midland Street	Bay City	July 17, 1997
City Hall†		301 Washington Street	Bay City	April 5, 1974
James Clements Airport Administration Building†		614 South River Road	Bay City	April 21, 1980
Covenant Presbyterian Church		1001 N Lynn Street	Bay City	May 18, 1989
Davidson Shipyard		800 John F. Kennedy Drive	Bay City	August 6, 1976
First Presbyterian Church		805 Center Avenue	Bay City	August 17, 2000
The Leona		727 South Linwood Beach Road	Linwood	May 20, 1982
Andrew C. Maxwell House-demolished		615 Fourth Street	Bay City	April 24, 1981
James J. McCormick House		1011 S Water Street	Bay City	January 27, 1983
Mercy Hospital and Elizabeth McDowell Bialy Memorial House†		15th and Water Streets	Bay City	July 29, 1980
Midland Street Commercial District†		500-800 blocks of Midland Street	Bay City	March 16, 1995
Ogaukawning Church		Hidden Road at North Euclid Road	Bay City	June 30, 1988
Pere Marquette Railroad Depot (Bay City Station)†		919 Boutell Place	Bay City	June 10, 1980
Pine Grove Cemetery		4495 Eleven Mile Road, NW corner of Eleven Mile and North Union roads	Auburn	October 12, 1990
Sage Library†		100 East Midland Street, east of Winona Avenue	Bay City	January 29, 1979
Saginaw Bay Informational Designation		Bay City State Park, five miles north of Bay City on M-247	Bay City	October 30, 1956
Saint James High School (Demolished)		Center Street	Bay City	January 15, 1973
Saint Joseph Catholic Church	St. Joseph's Catholic Church in Bay City, MI	1005 Third Street	Bay City	May 25, 2000
Saint Paul Evangelical Lutheran Church and Cemetery		6100 Saginaw Road	Bay City	June 5, 1997
Saint Stanislaus Kostka Roman Catholic Church		1503 Kosciuszko, Suite #100	Bay City	January 17, 1991
Sugar Factories		Woodside Avenue at Scheurman Street	Essexville	December 10, 1971
Swedish Evangelical Lutheran Sion Church Informational Designation		501 S Catherine St, SW corner of Thomas and Henry Streets	Bay City	August 23, 1990
Thoburn United Methodist Church		1301 Leng St, Bay City, MI 48706	Bay City	April 28, 1987
Trinity Episcopal Church and Eddy-Shearer Residence		911 Center Avenue	Bay City	January 8, 1981
Tromble House†		Veterans Memorial Park (114, 116, and 118 Webster Street)	Bay City	August 13, 1971

== See also ==
- National Register of Historic Places listings in Bay County, Michigan

== Sources ==
- Historic Sites Online – Bay County. Michigan State Housing Developmental Authority. Accessed January 23, 2011.
