= Veterans Memorial Park (Bay City, Michigan) =

Public park in Bay City, Michigan

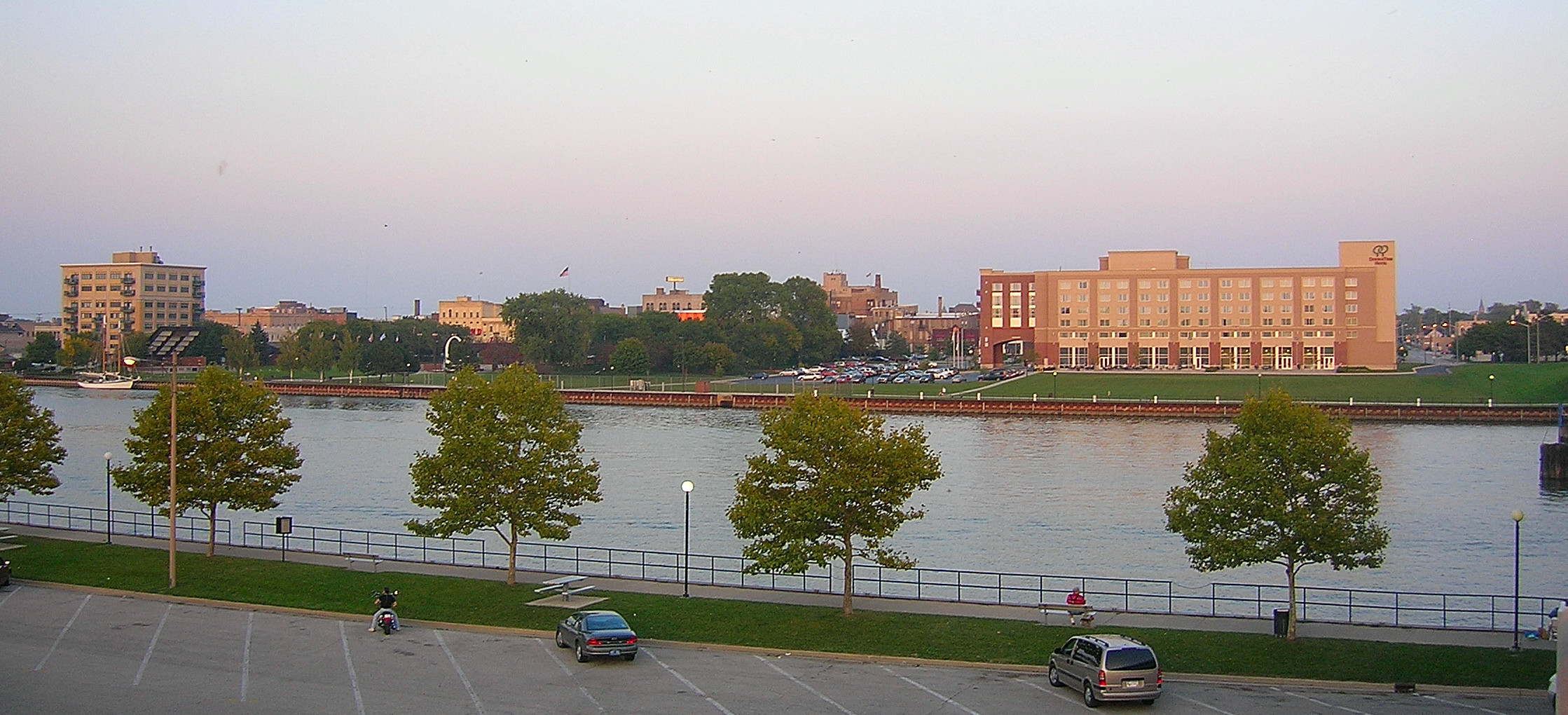
- View of Bay City at dusk from the park in Sep't., 2007.

- Location within Michigan
- Type: Public park
- Location: 800 John F. Kennedy Drive; Bay City, Michigan
- Coordinates: 43°35′50″N 83°53′47″W
- Area: 97 acres (39 ha)
- Operator: City of Bay City Parks Department
- Open: Year round
- Status: Open

Veterans Memorial Park is the central park of Bay County, Michigan. The park, approximately 97 acres (39 ha), is located along the west bank of the Saginaw River in Bay City, Michigan, United States. Across the river is another city park, Wenonah Park.

== Features ==
Veterans Memorial Park includes many features, including a public marina, sports field, an arboretum, an exercise track, a memorial to war veterans, and a Riverwalk that runs the length of the park and beyond.

=== Liberty Harbor Marina ===
Liberty Harbor Marina is a public marina in Veterans Memorial Park located north of Veterans Memorial Bridge. It is certified by the Michigan Department of Natural Resources and includes 99 berths, a concession stand, and a parking lot.

=== Kantzler Memorial Arboretum ===
Kantzler Memorial Arboretum is an arboretum located in a 12 acres (4.9 ha) plaza landscaped with plants maintained by civic and private organizations around the area. It is located along the Saginaw River near the Community Center.

Along the north-side of the arboretum is a 500 feet (150 m) inlet once used for ship building, known as the Davidson Dry Dock. Over the mouth of the dry dock is a footbridge that joins with the Riverwalk.

=== Santa House ===
Santa House is a log building leased annually to Santa House Inc. every December. It is located near the entrance to the park's John F. Kennedy Drive entrance.

=== Trombley House ===
Trombley House is Bay County's first frame house. It was completed in 1837 by Joseph Tromblé and moved from 24th and Water across the river to the park in 1981. It is owned, maintained, managed, and primarily used by the Bay County Historical Society.

=== Fitness Park ===
Fitness Park is an exercise track specifically equipped for disabled people established in 1986. The looping track breaks off from the Riverwalk and proceeds through designated exercise areas.

== Events ==
A number of community events are held at Veterans Memorial Park, such as concerts, the Bay City Fireworks Festival, Pig Gig, River Roar, and Walleyes for Warriors.

== See also ==
- Veterans Memorial Bridge (Bay City, Michigan)
