= Wenona Beach Amusement Park =

Defunct amusement park in Bay County, Michigan

- Previously known as Wenona Beach Entertainment Center
- Interactive map of Wenona Beach Amusement Park
- Location: Bangor Township, Michigan
- Coordinates: 43.653441°N 83.872236°W
- Status: Defunct
- Opened: 1887
- Closed: 1964
- Area: 40 acres (16 ha)

Wenona Beach Amusement Park was an amusement park in Bay County, Michigan located along the Saginaw Bay near Bangor Township and the mouth of the Saginaw River. The park opened in 1887 and closed in 1964.

== History ==
Wenona Beach Amusement Park was preceded by the Oa-at-ka Beach (1887), the Bellevue Beach and in 1876 by the Bay View Resort. The resort was home to a brawl between Fabian Joe Fournier, who helped inspire Paul Bunyan legends, and Blinky Robertson prior to Fournier's murder on the Water Street steamboat dock.

Wenona Beach Entertainment Center, later Wenona Beach Amusement Park, was founded in 1890 by lumber barons such as Spencer O. Fisher, Henry H. Aplin, E.S. Van Liew and Theodore F. Shepard. They contracted John Rabid to design the park, which featured a large pavilion that served as the park's focal point and a large pier stretching onto the Saginaw Bay. The owners, who also owned the Bay City Street Car Company, built a railway line that looped by the Kawkawlin River and took passengers from the west side of Bay City, Michigan to the park. The grand opening occurred on July 1, 1890. An electric trolley, and later motor buses made regular trips to the park from the city.

During the first half of the 20th century, the park was operated by the Bay City Traction and Electric Company. One of the park's early managers, J. Carpenter, was taken to court for operating a theater without a license in violation of an ordinance passed by the Bangor Township Board on June 6, 1906.

By the early 1900s and 1920s, the park had become a popular destination for people living in nearby counties.

In 1907, the resort drew media attention to a speedboat race between the Arrow and W.J. Oulette's Secret, which set a then world record of 26.6 miles per hour (42.8 km/h).

By 1942, the park was owned by H. M. Smart and Otto Pierce.

In March 1947, the park was damaged by a storm which swept through the Midwestern United States. The storm's 70 miles per hour (110 km/h) winds pushed 40 feet (12 m) high ice piles from the Saginaw Bay onto the park's shores. The park's bath house near the shoreline was demolished by the ice. the Roller Coaster and other structures were damaged by the ice pressing against them.

The park suffered from poor attendance in its later years and closed in September 1964. The land has been occupied by a trailer park since 1965.

== Attractions ==
Wenona Beach Amusement Park was described by Augustus H. Gansser in his 1905 book on the History of Bay County, Michigan as "the 'Coney Island' of the Lakes." The park featured a casino, vaudeville performances, boating, carnival games, bath houses, docking facilities, and a boardwalk.

The park also featured rides such as Circular Swings, a Joy Wheel on the shoreline, a steam carousel, the Roller Coaster, the Jack Rabbit (a roller coaster), the Bullet (a centrifugal force ride), Bumper cars, the Roll-O-Plane, and a ferris wheel with a view of the Saginaw Bay.

A large ballroom was used for dancing and roller skating.

The park, especially the casino, held regular live performances by entertainers such as Jack Benny, Perry Como, Bob Crosby, The Dorsey Brothers, Marie Dressler, W. C. Fields, Woody Herman, Isham Jones, Guy Lombardo, Ozzie and Harriet, the Marx Brothers, Red Nichols and His Five Pennies, Ted Weems. Local Harry Jarkey made regular appearances.

There were a number of food concession stands, including a popular french fry stand at the north end of the park, Wright's Cafe, an ice cream parlor, and a restaurant in the casino.

== Events ==
Many large social events, such as family reunions and corporate outings utilized Wenona Beach Amusement Park's large picnic area. The park also hosted an annual 4th of July fireworks display.

== Publications ==
In 1988, J.R. Watson, who worked at the park when he was 12 years old, published a book about the park titled Wenona Beach. Watson soon sold all 8000 copies, and decided in 2007 to reissue the book.

== See also ==
- Wenonah Park
