= Bay City Fireworks Festival =

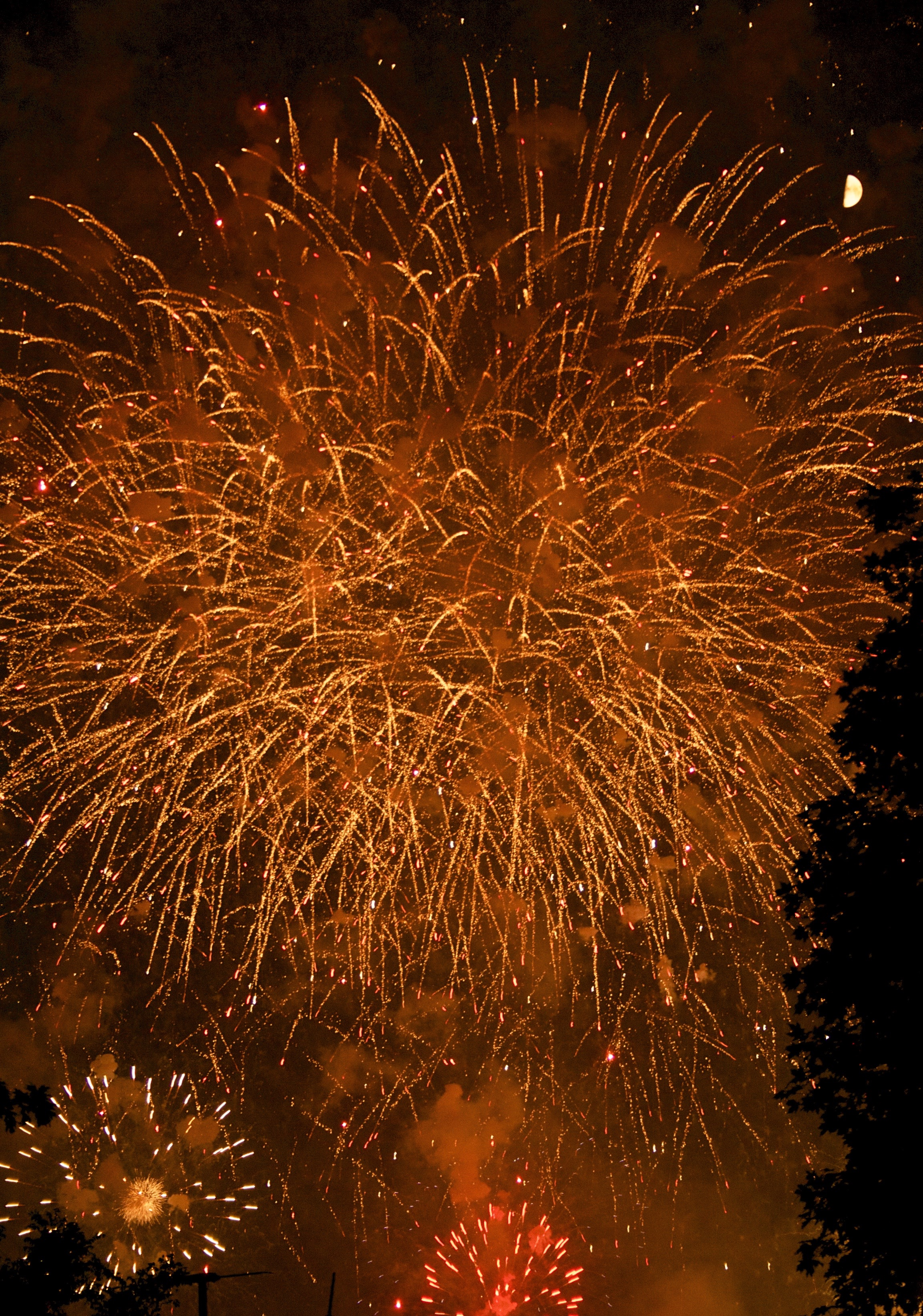
- Fireworks display at 2014 festival
- Genre: American Independence Day fireworks festival
- Date: 4th of July weekend
- Frequency: Annually
- Locations: Bay City, Michigan, United States of America
- Years active: 64
- Inaugurated: 4th of July 1962
- Website: www.baycityfireworksfest.net

Grand finale of 2016 fireworks display

The Bay City Fireworks Festival is an American Independence Day festival held each year around the 4th of July on the Saginaw River near Veterans Memorial Bridge in Bay City, Michigan.

In addition to the fireworks display, the festival also features several days of live concerts, a carnival, boat tours and more.

== History ==
The festival originally started in 1962, by resident Richard Davis, and was funded by Bay City's Fraternal Order of Police at a cost of $2,500.

In 1982, the show was moved from a one night affair on the Fourth of July, becoming a weekend festival with three days of fireworks.

In 2008, the show included a barge in the middle of the river to make for a third launching site.

The fireworks display is usually produced by local fireworks company Wolverine Fireworks, which is based in Kawkawlin, Michigan, less than 10 miles from the site of the festival.

The fireworks were cancelled in 2020; however, during the COVID-19 pandemic.

== 50th anniversary ==
In 2012, the 50th anniversary of the Bay City fireworks Festival featured 50,000 fireworks shells, and a musically choreographed fireworks display that lasted more than 50 minutes, making it the largest fireworks display ever seen in Michigan at that time.

The festival was divided into three separate shows, on Thursday, Friday, and Saturday. The Friday show featured the colors of area schools who helped raise money for that year's festival. The grand finale on Friday night featured the colors of whichever school raised the most money for the Fireworks Festival throughout the year.

While fundraising and setup for the festival is a year-round affair, actual set up for the fireworks display in 2012 required over 1,600 hours loading and arranging shells and wires. The shows were all choreographed to music, which were broadcast via speakers set up at Wenonah Park on the Saginaw River's east bank, and Veterans Memorial Park on the river's west bank. Music were broadcast over the radio on 94.5 F.M.

Performers included Bull Honkey Deluxe, Jedi Mind Trip, The Magic Bus, and Steel Wheels.

== Recognition ==
In 2012, the Bay City Fireworks Festival made a national list of great fireworks shows, as chosen by voters.
