= Wenonah Park =

Public park in Bay City, Michigan

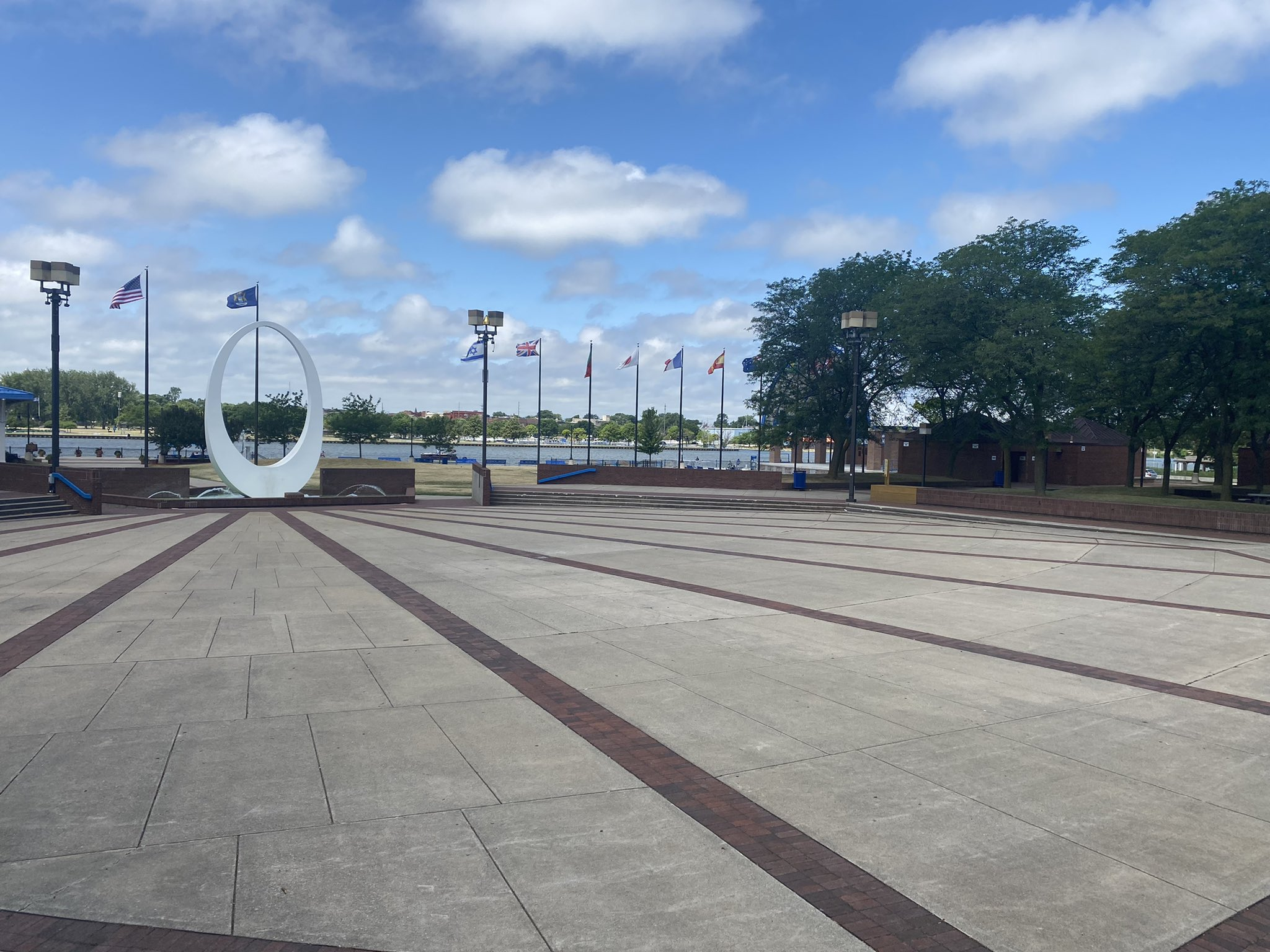

- Location within Michigan
- Type: Semi Public park
- Location: 801 North Water Street; Bay City, Michigan
- Coordinates: 43°35′54″N 83°53′28″W
- Area: 6.1 acres (2.5 ha)
- Created: 1908
- Operator: City of Bay City Parks Department
- Open: Year round semi public admission fees apply
- Status: Open

Wenonah Park is the central park of Bay County, Michigan. The park, approximately 6.1 acres (2.5 ha), is located along the east bank of the Saginaw River in Bay City, Michigan, United States and centered on an amphitheatre. Across the river is another city park, Veterans Memorial Park.

== History ==
Wenonah Park was established in 1908 as a part of the construction of the adjacent Wenonah Hotel (the site is now occupied by the Delta College Planetarium), giving the hotel a clear view of the riverfront. Both the hotel and park opened on November 9, 1908. Full development of the park and construction of the auditorium began after the hotel opening. The overall project involved the construction of the hotel at a cost of over US$300,000 (equivalent to $10,750,000 in 2025) and an auditorium estimated to cost US$50,000 (equivalent to $1,791,667 in 2025). It was contingent upon the citizens of Bay City approving US$200,000 (equivalent to $7,166,667 in 2025) in bonds for the purchase of two blocks along the Saginaw River, the removal of buildings, and conversion of the sites into a public park. The Lumbermen's State Bank assumed control of the bonds and credited the Wenonah Park fund on May 18, 1908, with the value of the bonds.

== Features ==
Wenonah Park is centered on an amphitheatre known as The World Friendship Shell. It is decorated with a large oval sculpture and water fountain. There is a boat dock along the seawall designed to accommodate watercraft of various sizes.

== Events ==
A number of community events are held at Wenonah Park, such as concerts, arts performances, the Bay City Fireworks Festival, and the Festival of Lights in November.

== See also ==
- Veterans Memorial Bridge (Bay City, Michigan)
- Wenona Beach Amusement Park
