= Center Avenue Neighborhood Residential District =

- U.S. National Register of Historic Places
- U.S. Historic district
- Michigan State Historic Site
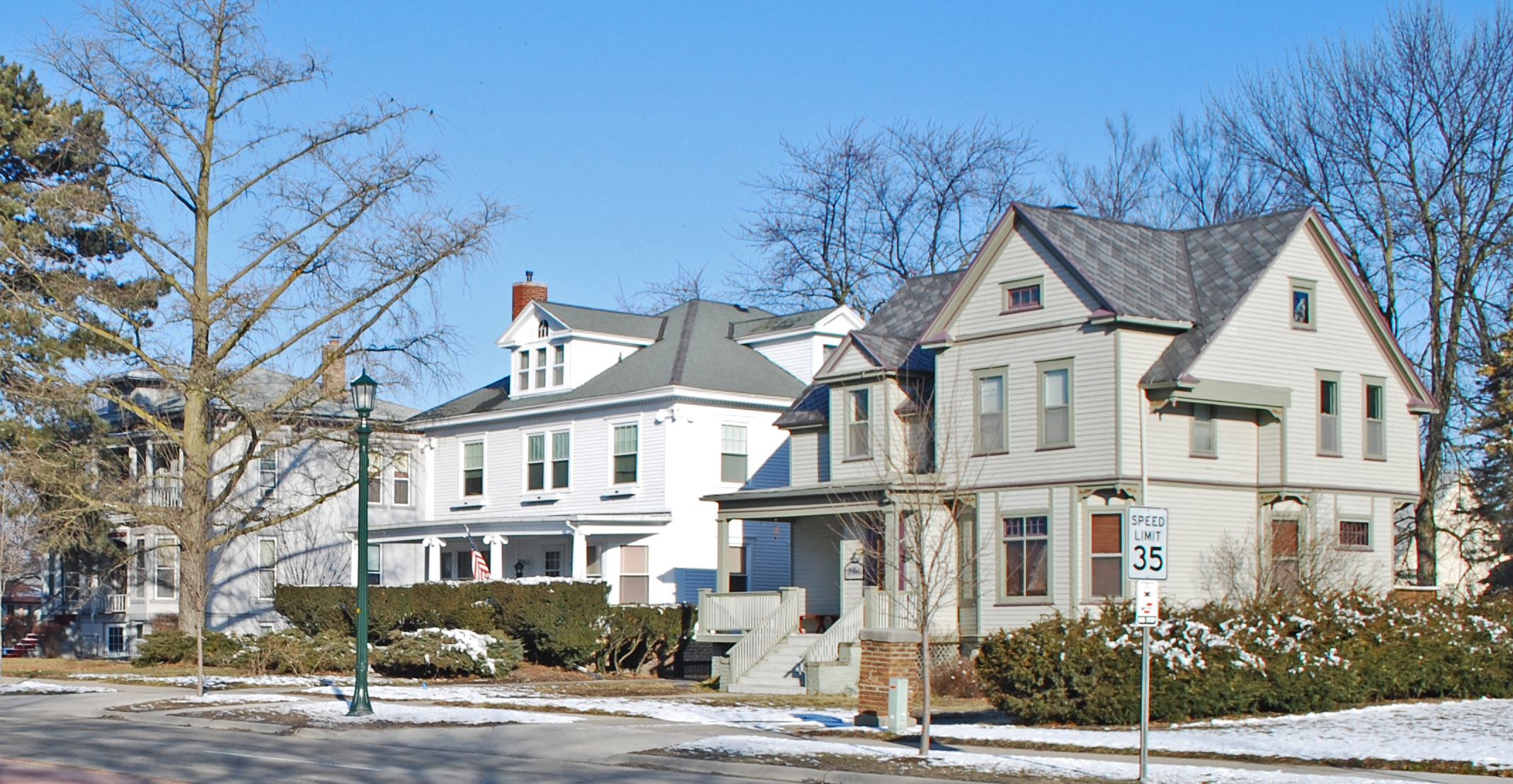
- Center, between Pendleton and Trumbull

- Location within Michigan Location within the United States
- Interactive map
- Location: Roughly bounded by N. Madison, Green, & Center Aves., 4th, 5th, 6th, & 10th Sts., Carroll Rd. & Nurmi Dr., Bay City, Michigan
- Coordinates: 43°35′48″N 83°52′14″W
- Area: 335.3 acres (135.7 ha)
- Architectural style: Mid 19th Century Revival, Late 19th And Early 20th Century American Movements, Late Victorian
- NRHP reference No.: 82002826 (original); 12001027 (increase)

Significant dates
- Added to NRHP: April 22, 1982
- Boundary increase: December 12, 2012

The Center Avenue Neighborhood Residential District is a residential historic district located in Bay City, Michigan, running primarily along Center, Fifth, and Sixth Avenues between Monroe and Green Avenues, with additional portions of the district along Fourth between Madison and Johnson, down to Tenth Avenue between Madison and Lincoln, along Green to Ridge, and around Carroll Park. The original section, along Center and portions of Fifth and Sixth, was listed on the National Register of Historic Places in 1982. A boundary increase including the other sections of the neighborhood was listed in 2012.

== History ==
The first sawmill in Bay City was built in 1837; by 1854, a dozen mills were operating; and by 1860, over eight hundred people lived in the city. The city boomed during the next decade, and by 1870, 7000 people lived in Bay City. The influx of people created a housing shortage for rich and poor alike, and wealthy citizens chose to build along Center Avenue. Although the area had first been platted in 1837, development did not occur until the 1870s and 1880s. Wealthy families, mostly in the lumber and salt trade, found that the area was convenient to bay City's commercial district, while still maintaining a quiet residential feel.

After the turn of the century, lumbering went into decline, and new industry and trades took its place, including agriculture, iron, and textiles. Newer wealthy businessmen followed their predecessors and built houses along Center Avenue, both in among the earlier houses and farther eastward. The district continued to expand until the Great Depression. In the subsequent years, the district has maintained the residences and streetscapes that made it a fashionable place to build early in its history.

In 2005, a group of neighbors began meeting in the area to promote historical preservation in the neighborhood. From this, the Center Avenue Neighborhood Association (CANA) was born. The Association has helped promote the neighborhood and support the City of Bay City in the administration of a National Scenic Byways grant.

== Description ==
The Center Avenue Neighborhood Residential District contains a total of 936 buildings, of which 879 contribute to the historic character of the neighborhood. These including some of the finest Victorian Italianate, Stick style, Queen Anne, Richardsonian Romanesque, and Châteauesque buildings in the city. Most of the structures date from the early 1870s, when the neighborhood first began to develop, to about the turn of the century. Later residences from the first three decades of the 20th century include Georgian Revival, Renaissance Revival, Gothic Revival, Prairie Style, Arts and Crafts, and Bungalow structures.

The district generally progresses from west to east, with the earliest construction in the western part of the district, and later construction on the far north- and south-west edges. The later houses include Arts and Crafts and Colonial Revival houses from the early part of the 20th century, as well as a number of outstanding Moderne and Mid-century modern houses.

The most significant of the houses constructed in the district include:

- James Shearer Residence - 701 Center Avenue. A grand Italianate residence constructed in 1876.
- Benjamin Burbridge Residence - 1403 Fifth Street. An asymmetric brick Italianate house constructed in 1884.
- John Gregory Residence - 1303 Fifth Street. A Stick style house constructed in 1879-80.
- William Clift Residence - 1409 Sixth Street. two story, two bay wood frame Queen Anne residence constructed in 1887.
- Charles Curtiss Residence - 924 Center Avenue. One of the grandest homes in the district, this sandstone and wood Queen Anne style house was constructed in 1891.
- Charles Eddy Residence - 1012 Fifth Street. An eclectic Queen Anne residence constructed in 1882.
- Frederick Bradley Residence - 1400 Center Avenue. A massive Queen Anne home with a complexly asymmetrical floorplan and massing and two elaborate porches, constructed in 1887-89.
- Fremont Chesbrough Residence - 1515 Center Avenue. A rough-faced stone and brick Romanesque residence built in 1891-91.
- Henry Clements Residence - 1601 Center Avenue. A vernacular Chateauesque structure with a steeply hipped roof built in 1890.
- Thomas Cranage Residence - 1001 Center Avenue. A Georgian Revival home with a grand front portico built in 1906.
- Homer Buck Residence - 820 Johnson Street. A Prairie Style-inspired home he built in 1909.

Although primarily residential, the district also includes some public buildings and spaces. These include:

- First Presbyterian Church - 805 Center Avenue. A Romanesque structure built in 1892 and designed by Bay City architects Pratt and Koeppe.
- Bay City Masonic Temple - 700 Madison Avenue. A large three story sandstone structure built in 1983, with a 1926 addition.
- Bay City Public Library - 708 Center Avenue. A Renaissance Revival-inspired Carnegie library built in 1922.
- First Congregational Church - 900 Sixth Street. A Gothic Revival church.
- Trinity Episcopal Church - 911 Center Avenue. Built in 1887 from a Gothic Revival design by architect Philip C. Floeter.
- St. Boniface Catholic Church - 500 North Lincoln Street. A Gothic Revival church.
- Madison Avenue M.E. Church - 400 Madison Avenue. Built in 1888 from a Gothic Revival design by architect Philip C. Floeter.
- Church of Christ, Scientist - 701 North Van Buren Street. Constructed in 1912 in the Neoclassical style.
- Temple Israel - 2300 Center Avenue. Designed by Alden Dow and constructed in 1960.
- Scottish Rite Temple - 610 Center Avenue. Constructed in 1926.
- Farragut School - 301 North Farragut Street. Art Moderne building was designed by Joseph Goddeyne and completed in 1939.

A small number of commercial buildings are also located in the district.

== Gallery ==
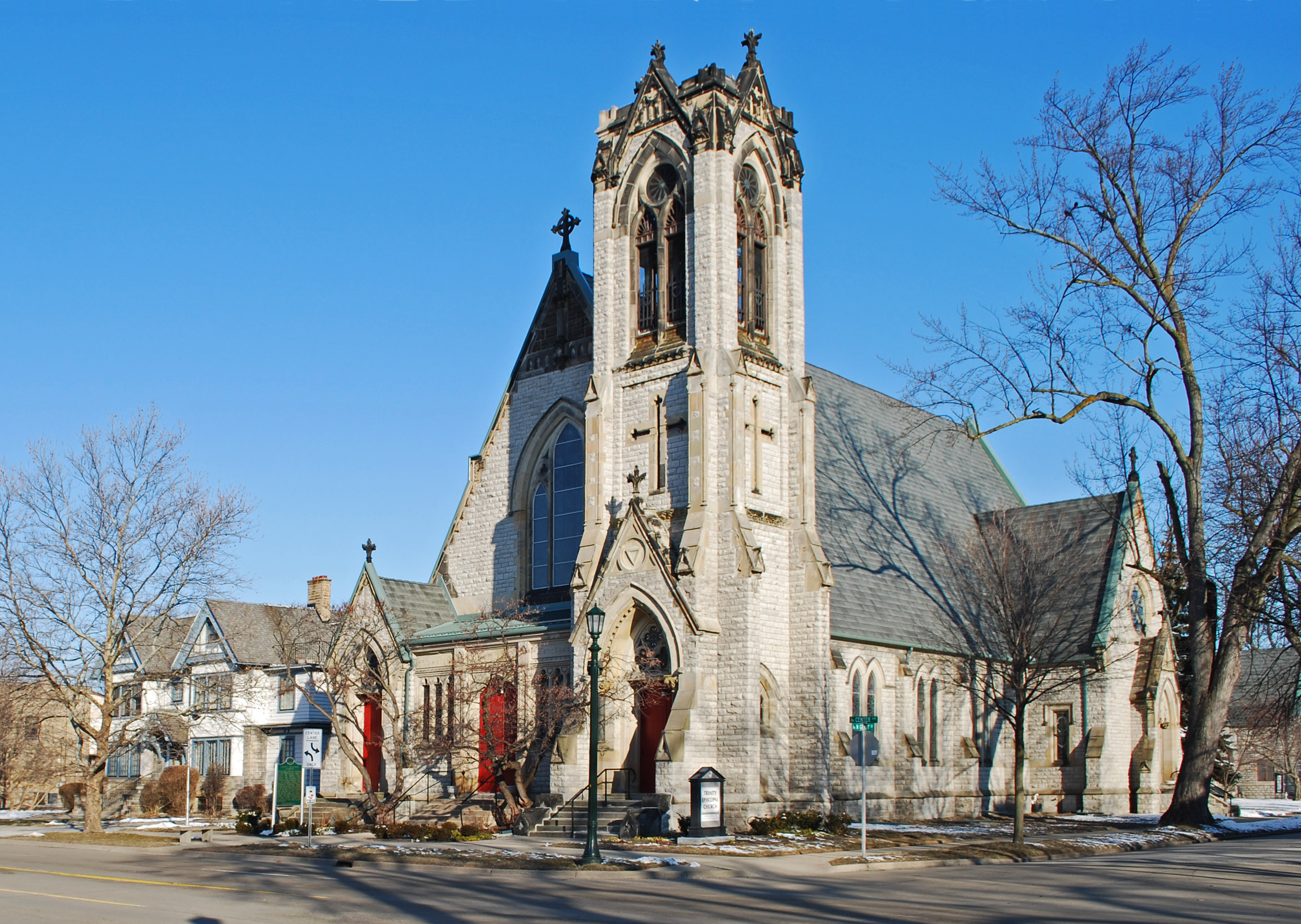
Trinity Episcopal Church, Center and Grant

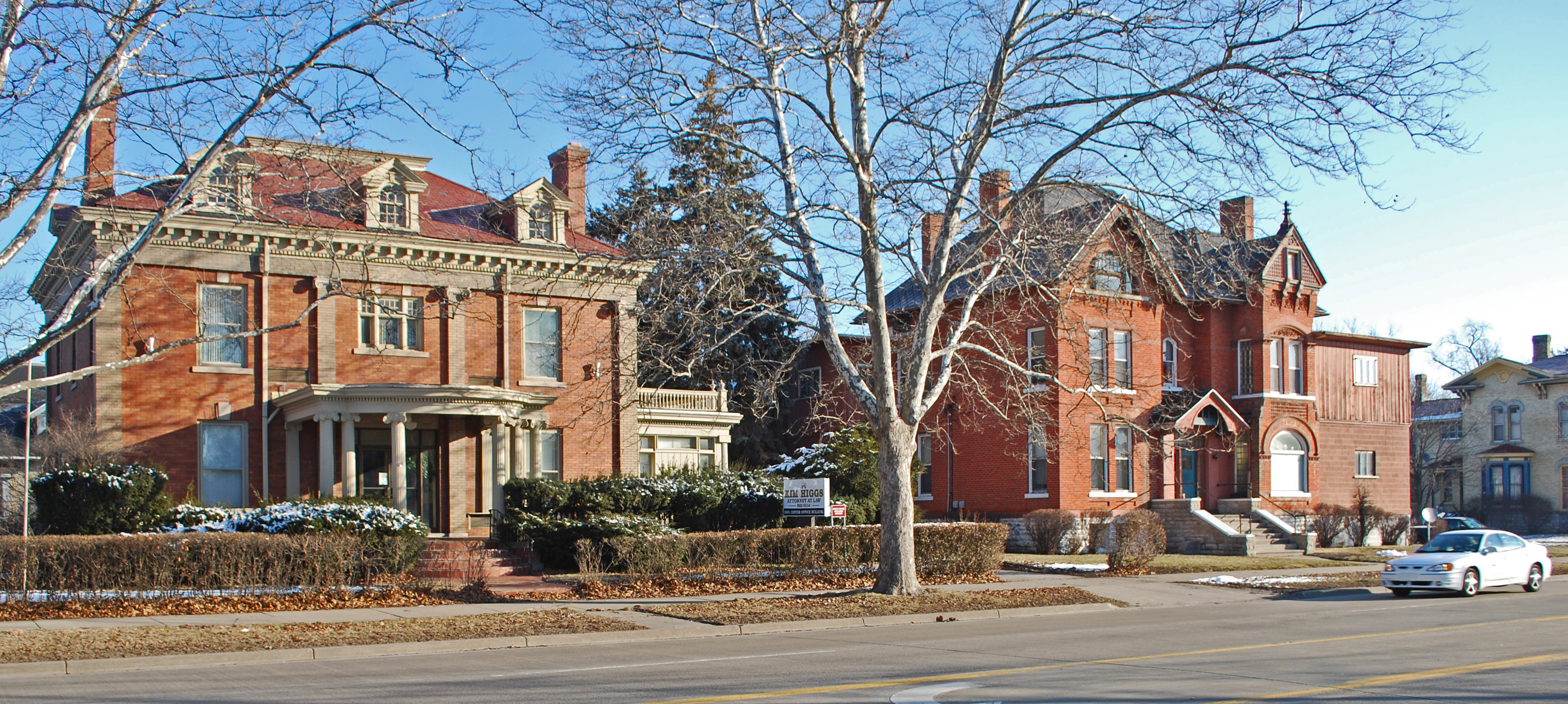
Brick homes on Center, between Grant and Farragut

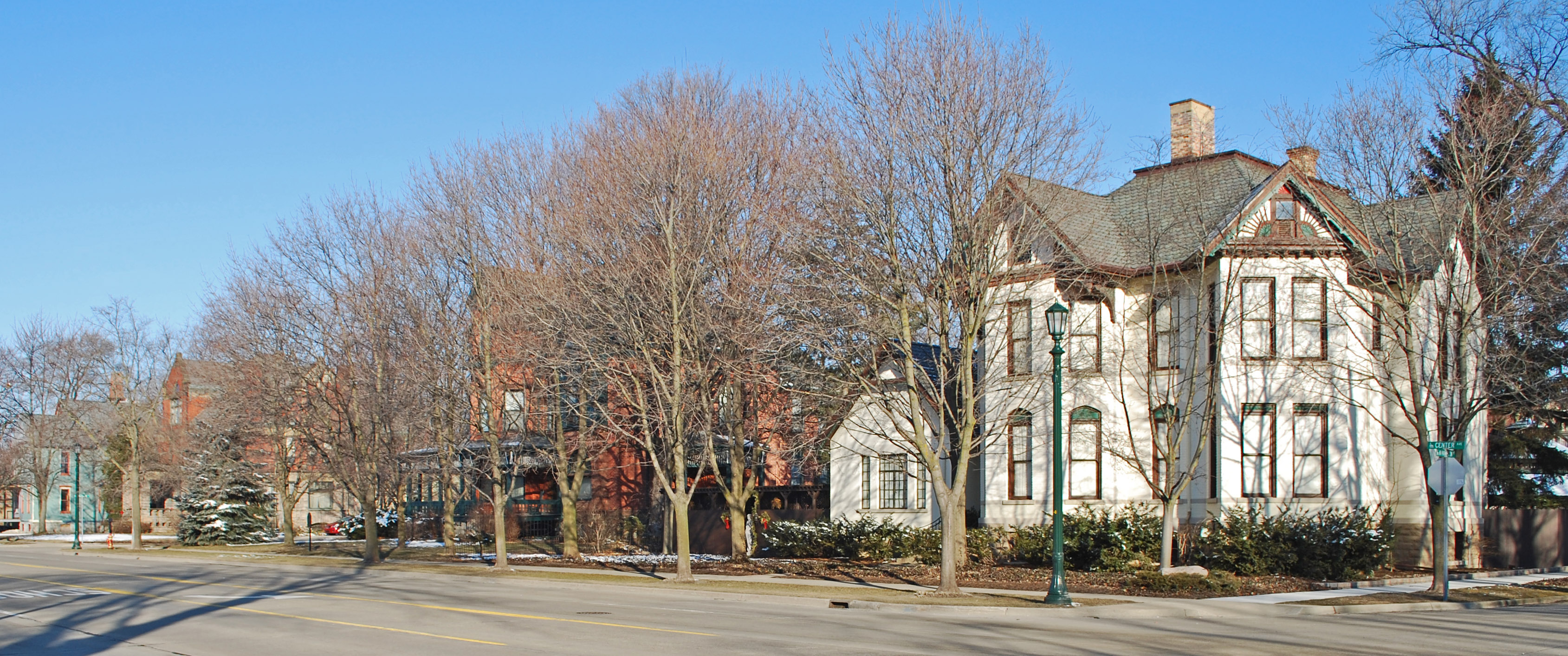
Corner of Hampton and Center

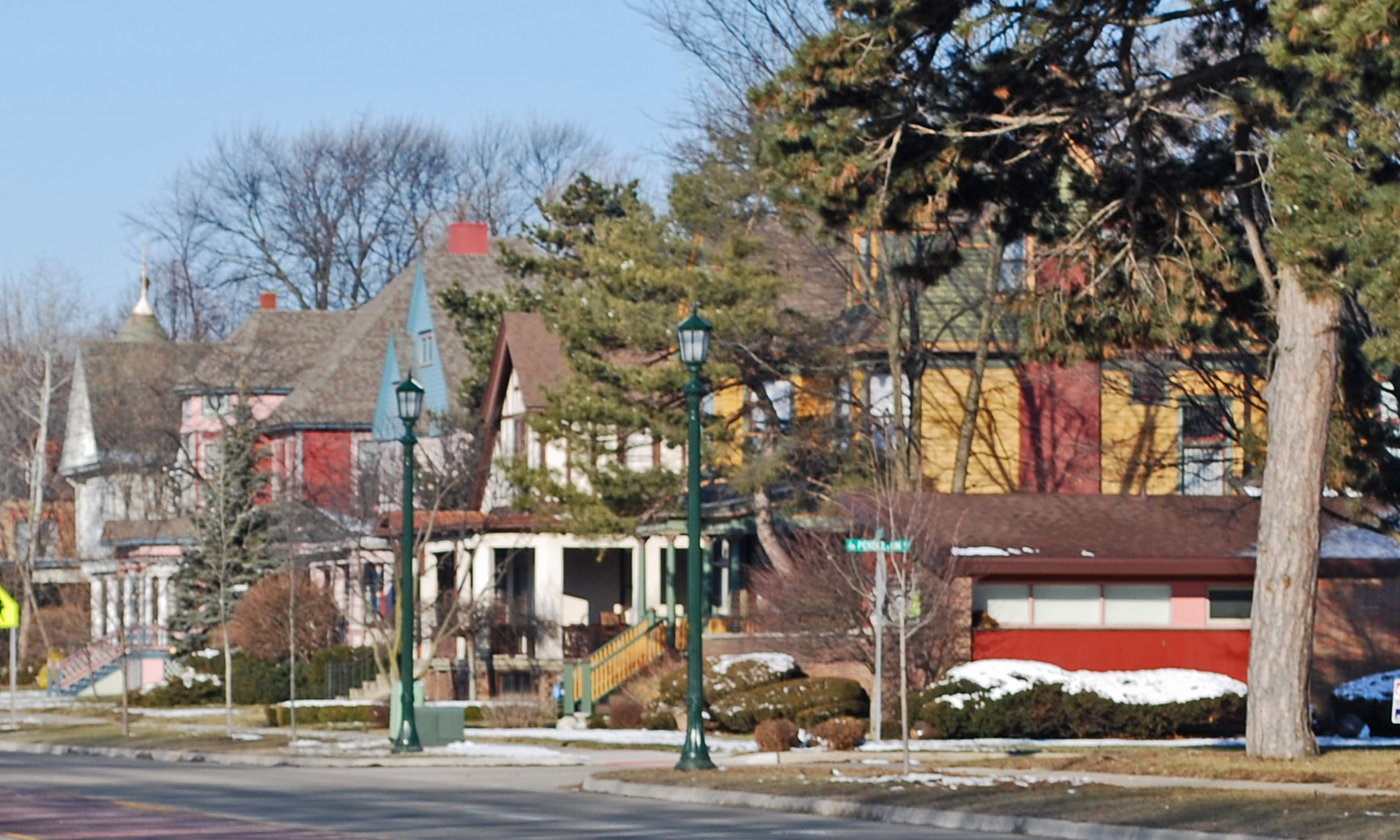
Corner of Center and Pendleton

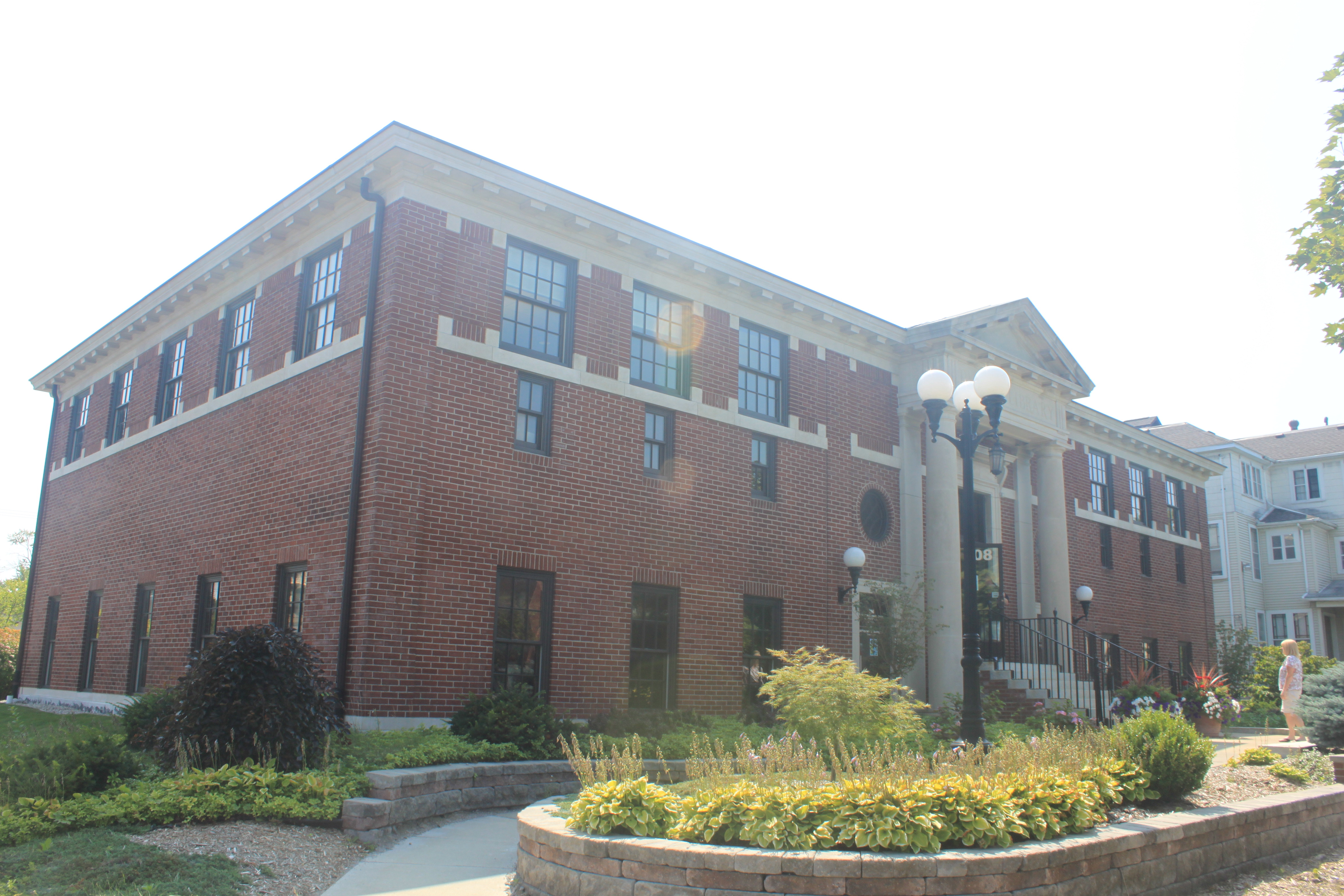
Former Carnegie Library, 708 Center

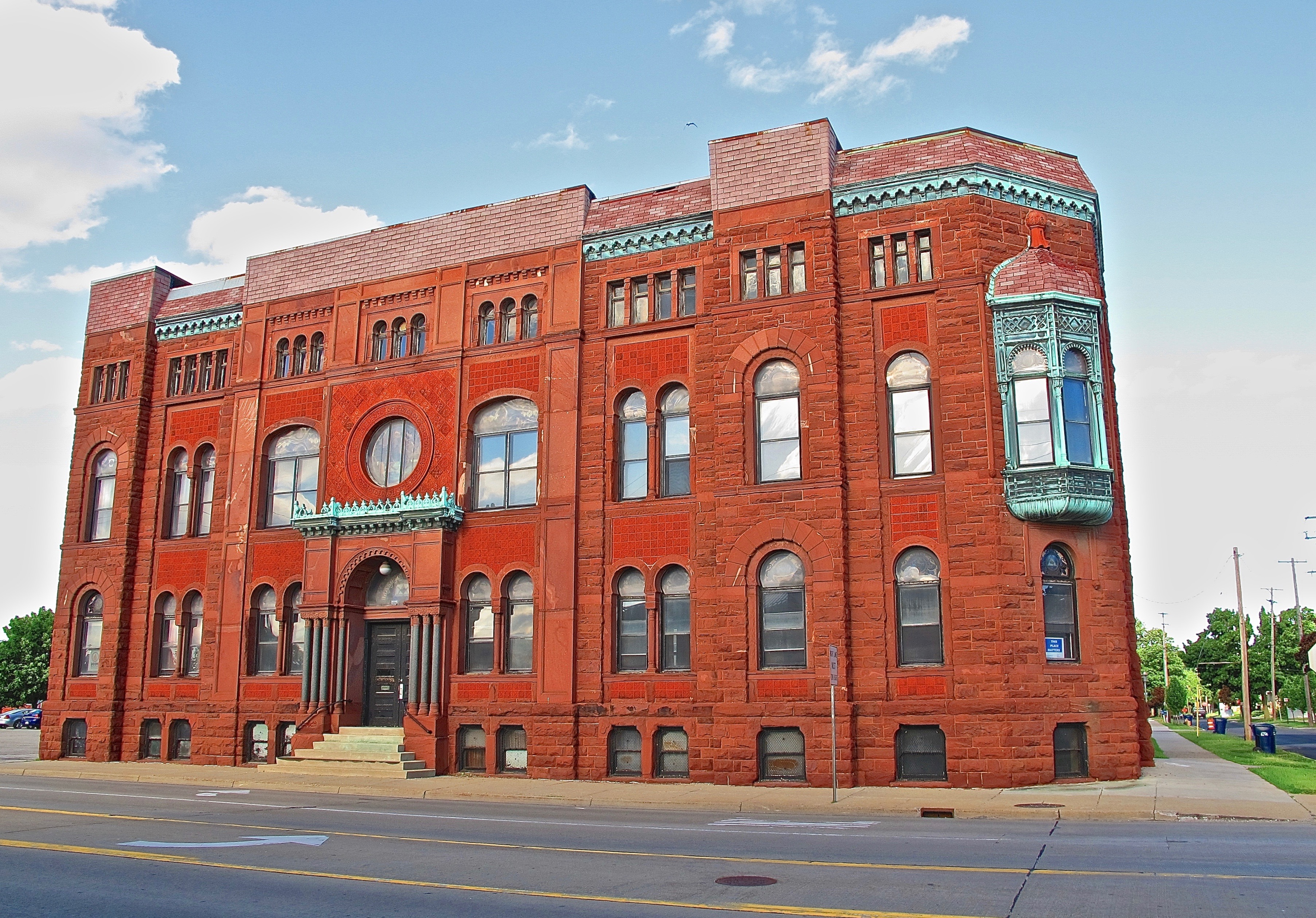
Masonic Temple, 700 Madison Avenue
