= Odd Fellows Valley Lodge No. 189 Building =

- U.S. National Register of Historic Places
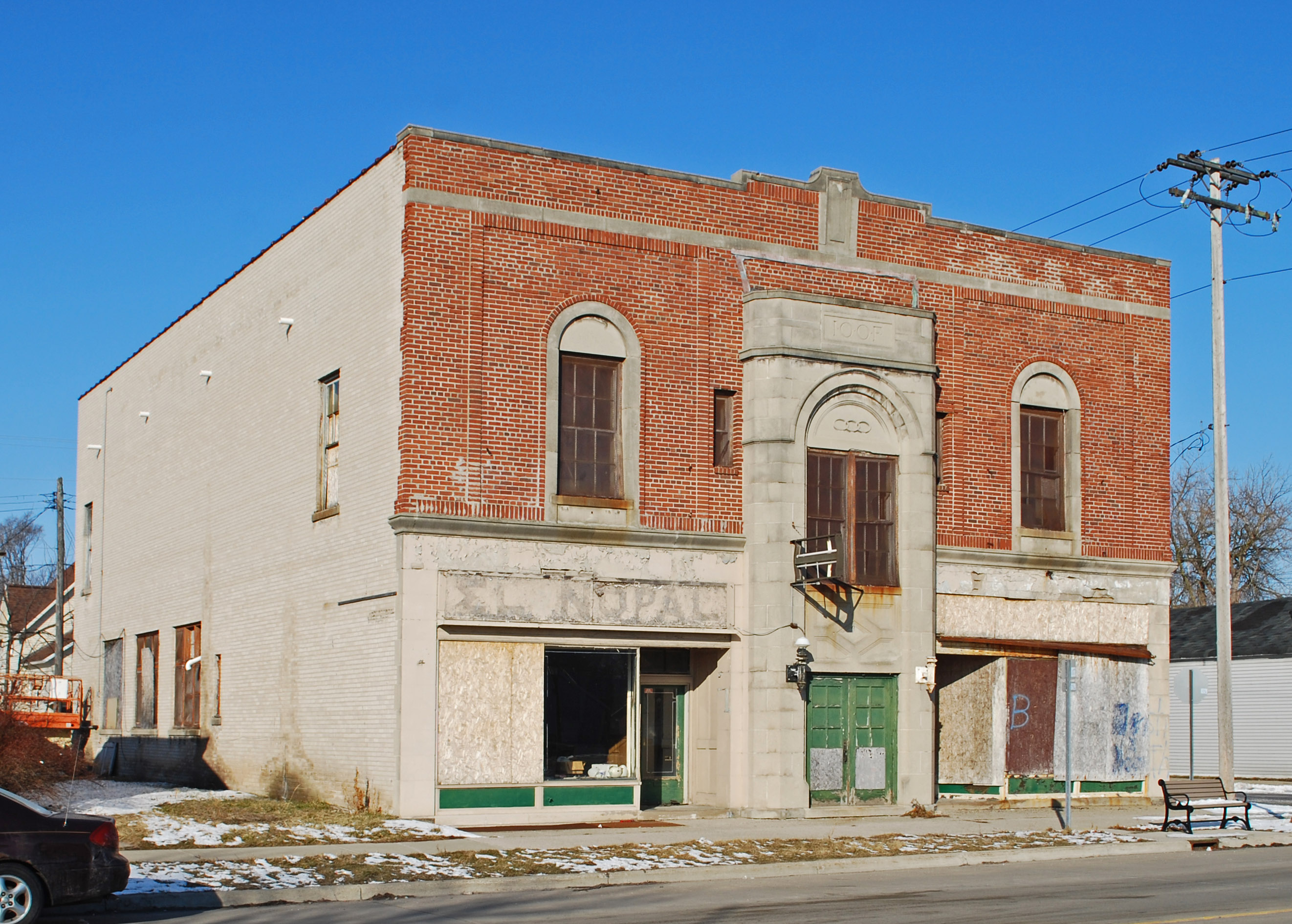

- Location within Michigan Location within the United States
- Interactive map
- Location: 1900 Broadway Avenue, Bay City, Michigan
- Coordinates: 43°34′11.07″N 83°53′37.75″W
- Built: 1928
- Architect: Averton E. Munger
- Architectural style: Classical Revival
- NRHP reference No.: 10000474
- Added to NRHP: July 19, 2010

The Odd Fellows Valley Lodge No. 189 Building is a historic building located at 1900 Broadway Avenue in Bay City, Michigan. It was listed on the National Register of Historic Places in 2010.

== History ==
The first area Odd Fellows lodge was established in 1866 in what was then the village of Portsmouth, and is now a section of Bay City. The Portsmouth Lodge No. 104 was chartered the following year. Lodge members soon voted to move to Bay City, and the name changed to Bay Lodge No. 104 in 1869. The city grew, and five more lodges were spun off from the Bay Lodge. The second of these was Valley Lodge No. 189, founded in 1872 and chartered in 1873. Along with Excelsior Lodge No. 30, Daughters of Rebekah, the Valley lodge met in a series of rented quarters until 1898, when they moved into their own building located at this site.

By the mid-1920s Lodge membership was peaking, and the Valley Lodge constructed a new, larger headquarters in 1928. The building was funded by local philanthropist Mendel J. Bialy, and designed by architect Averton E. Munger. Both the Valley Lodge and the Excelsior Lodge continued to use the building for over 50 years. However, Odd Fellows membership was declining, and in 1979 the Odd Fellows vacated the building.

The city considered renovating the building as a police station after it was purchased by the city in 2004 to save it from demolition. The city sold it in 2009 for $8,000 to a local developer who planned to restore it for use by a vocational school. The second floor was partially collapsed at that time. However, in 2015, the owner was convicted of tax fraud, throwing the future of the building into doubt.

== Description ==
The Valley Lodge Building is a two-story rectangular steel-frame Classical Revival building, clad with red, buff, and whitish brick walls and accented with cast concrete trim. It has a flat roof and stands on foundation walls built of concrete and fieldstone. The building is sited on a corner. The red brick front facade is symmetrical, with a slightly projecting, narrow central section that contains a double-door entryway. Storefronts topped with slightly projecting cornices flank the entryway. Above, the entry projection is flanked by large rectangular panels containing a single double-hung window set in an arched-head surround. A low parapet runs across the top. The side facade has a recessed entry and three large tripartite windows in the first floor and a single small window in the second.

Inside, the lodge has a small stair to the second floor inside the entryway. To either side on the first floor is retail space, which runs about half the length of the building. Behind are former lodge club room on one side and furnace room and office on the other. Another rear stair leads to the second floor. The second floor contains a large lodge room occupying most of the floor. The lodge room has a small stage and two tiers of theater seats set on risers along the wall on either side, with a level floor in the center. The room is lit by large rectangular skylights in the center of the room.
