= Bay City Masonic Temple =

- U.S. National Register of Historic Places
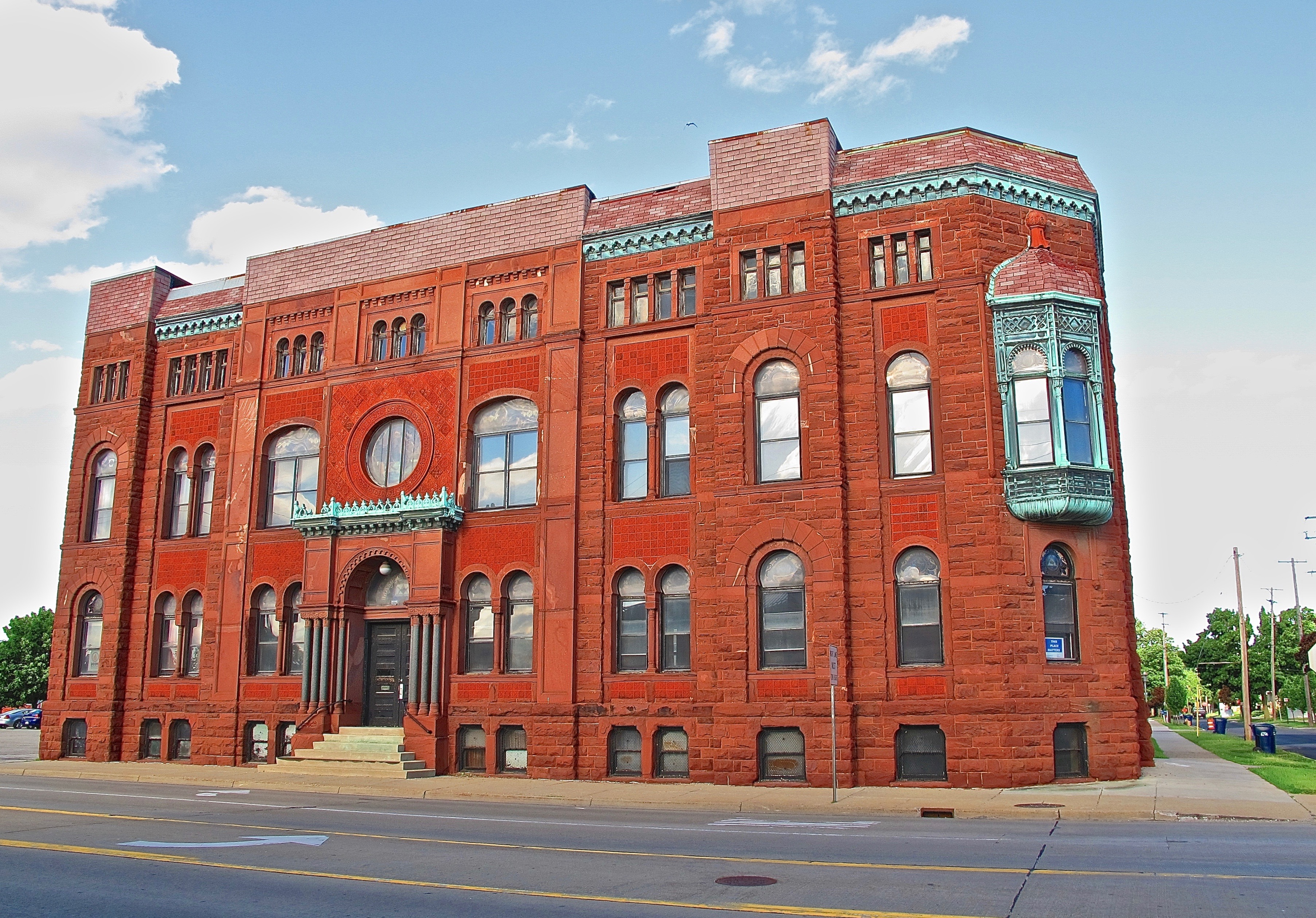

- Location within Michigan Location within the United States
- Interactive map
- Location: 700 N. Madison Ave., Bay City, Michigan
- Coordinates: 43°35′49″N 83°53′4″W
- Area: Under 1 acre (0.40 ha)
- Built: 1890
- Architect: Pratt & Koeppe
- Architectural style: Moorish Revival, Richardsonian Romanesque
- NRHP reference No.: 16000216
- Added to NRHP: May 3, 2016

The Bay City Masonic Temple is a historic building located at 700 North Madison Avenue in Bay City, Michigan. It was listed on the National Register of Historic Places in 1982.

== History ==
In 1860, a group of Bay City businessmen petitioned to organize a Masonic Lodge. An official charter was granted the next year, and the first meetings took place on the second floor of a commercial building. The lodge moved several times until it settled into the Eddy Block in 1878. In 1890 the Bay City Lodge, along with several other sister lodges, purchased land at this location to construct a building. They hired the local form of Pratt & Koeppe to design a building, and construction began in early 1890. The cornerstone was put in place in mid-1891, and the building was completed in February 1893.

The Masonic Temple was used by not only Masons, but also the community at large, and quickly became part of Bay City's cultural life. However, in May 1903, an electrical fire almost destroyed the building, completely devastating the interior, but leaving the exterior walls standing. The Masons voted to immediately rebuild, and reconstruction commenced right away, albeit using slightly different plans than the original. The rebuilt temple was rededicated in November 1905.

By the 1920s, membership in the masons was threatening to overwhelm the capacity of the building. In 1926, the Masons constructed a Scottish Rite Cathedral, known as the Consistory, next to the Temple. However, Masonic membership both nationally and locally fell during the Great Depression; although they rose again after World War II, membership steadily declined after about 1960. By 2004, the Bay City building was far too large for the local organization, and demolition of the 1893 building was considered. However, in 2005, the lodge made an agreement with the Bay City Arts Council, where the Council purchased the building and began to make necessary repairs and improvements. The organization Friends of the Historic Masonic Temple helped to repair and rehabilitate the building in order to turn it into a performing arts center.

The building now hosts movies, concerts, and other local events. The annual Excellency music festival also takes place at the Masonic Temple.

The building today is home to multiple organizations. One hosts the aforementioned events, coordinated by the Historic Masonic Temple group. The other is occupied by The Osgood, a local wedding venue.

== Description ==
The Masonic Temple is a three-story red-brown sandstone building, of Moorish Revival design with Richardsonian Romanesque elements, sitting on a raised rusticated sandstone foundation. It is sited on a corner lot, with two main facades. The Madison Avenue facade is symmetrical, but for a three-sided corner bay at one end. It has a wide projecting central entrance with four narrow bays to each side. Originally onion domes were located above the main entrance and atop the outer tower-like bays, but they have since been removed. Six steps lead to the raised entrance, which is flanked by four columns and topped with a semi-circular stained-glass window with the words MASONIC TEMPLE within. A round stained-glass window is located in the second story, and the entrance bay is capped with a copper cornice with pointed trefoil-like cutouts. The remainder of the windows are double hung units within horseshoe arches, with stained glass containing the names of lodge members above.

The Sixth Street facade has a three-part comer bay and three additional bays. It contains a second entrance in a projecting tower-like structure, through a pair of double doors. Nearby is a one and one-half-story portico set into the facade. The second-story windows are stained-glass rectangular windows with stained-glass semi-circular upper sections, similar to those on the main facade.

== Detail Gallery ==
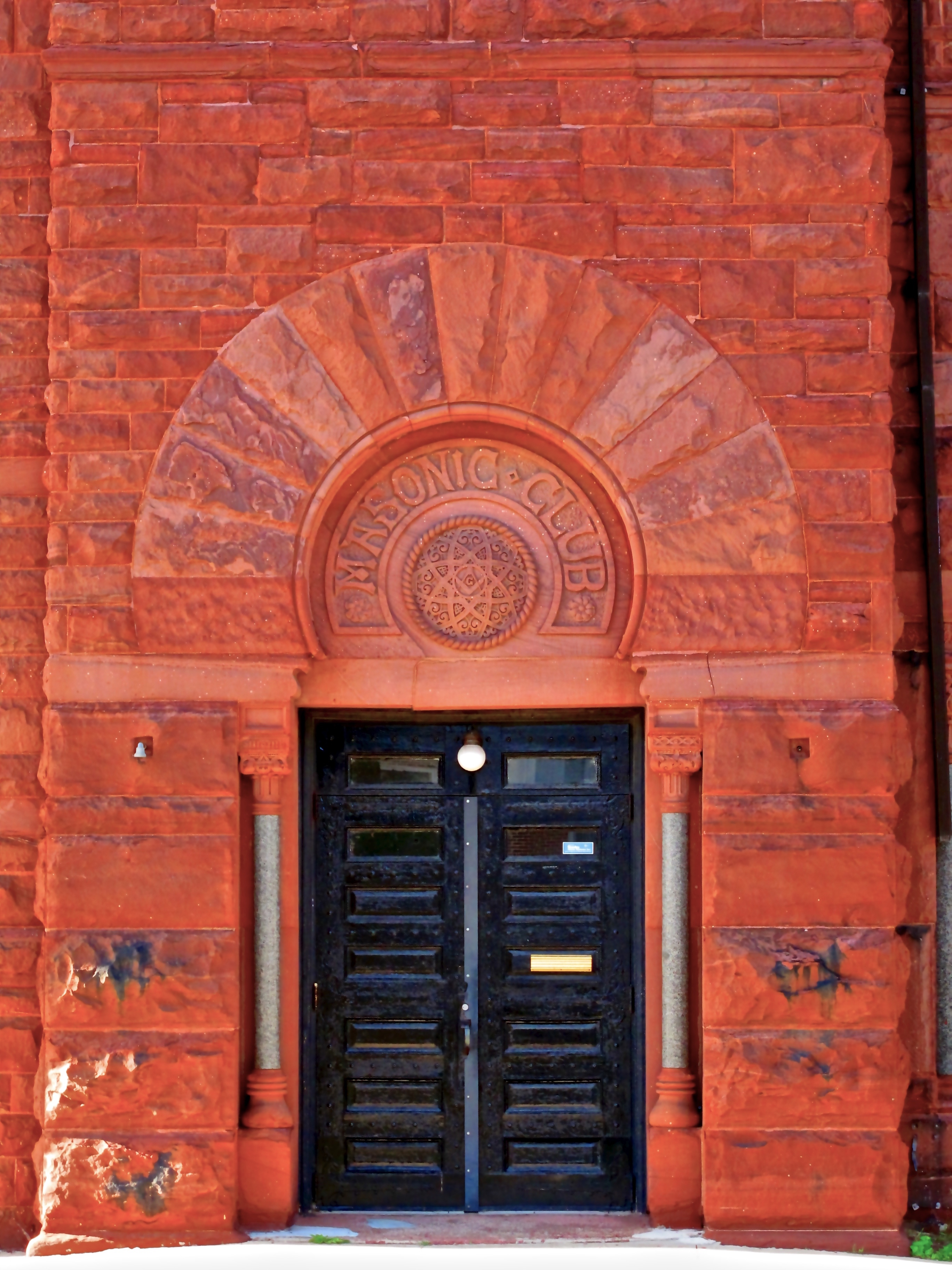
Side door

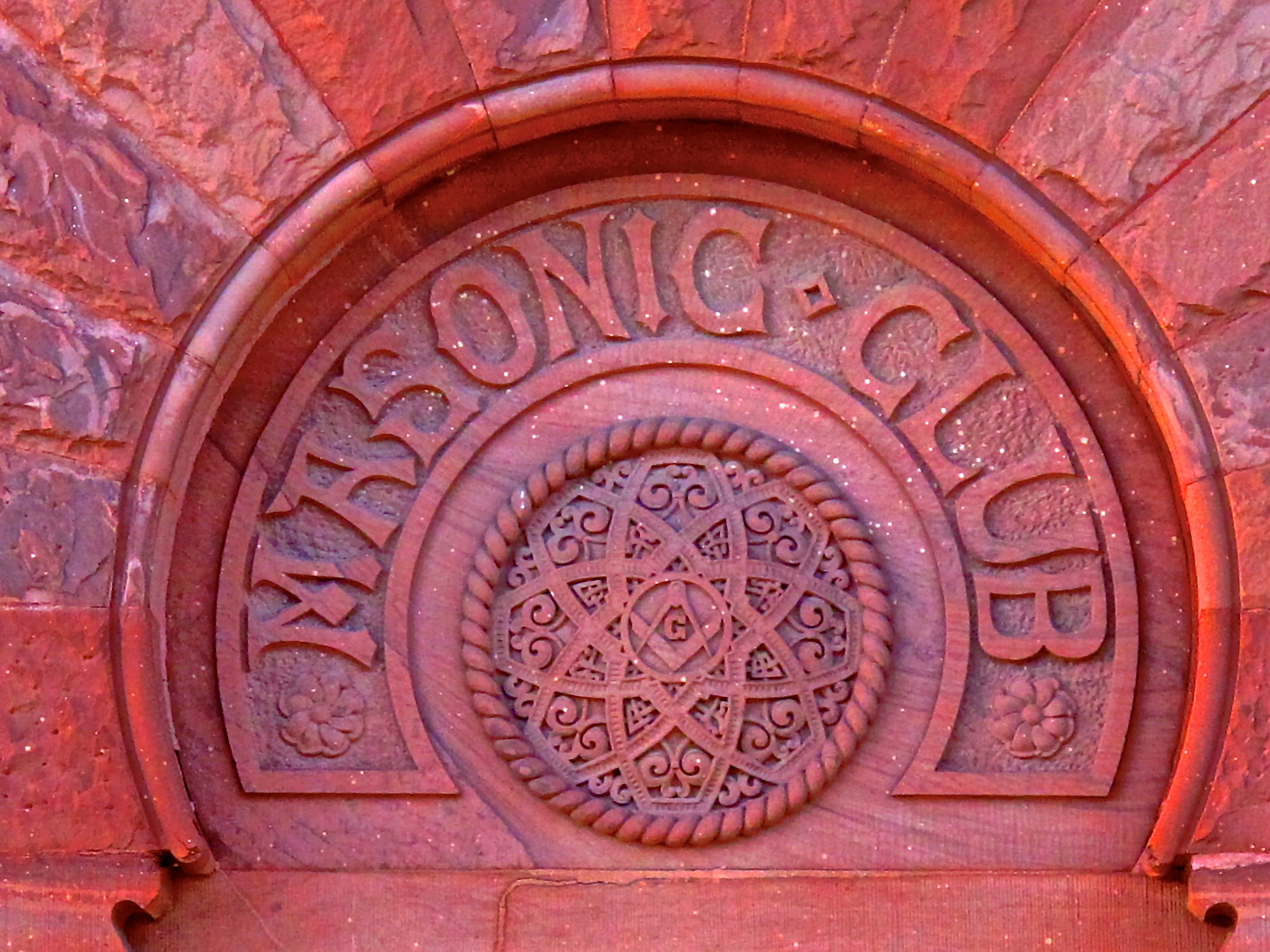
Detail above side door

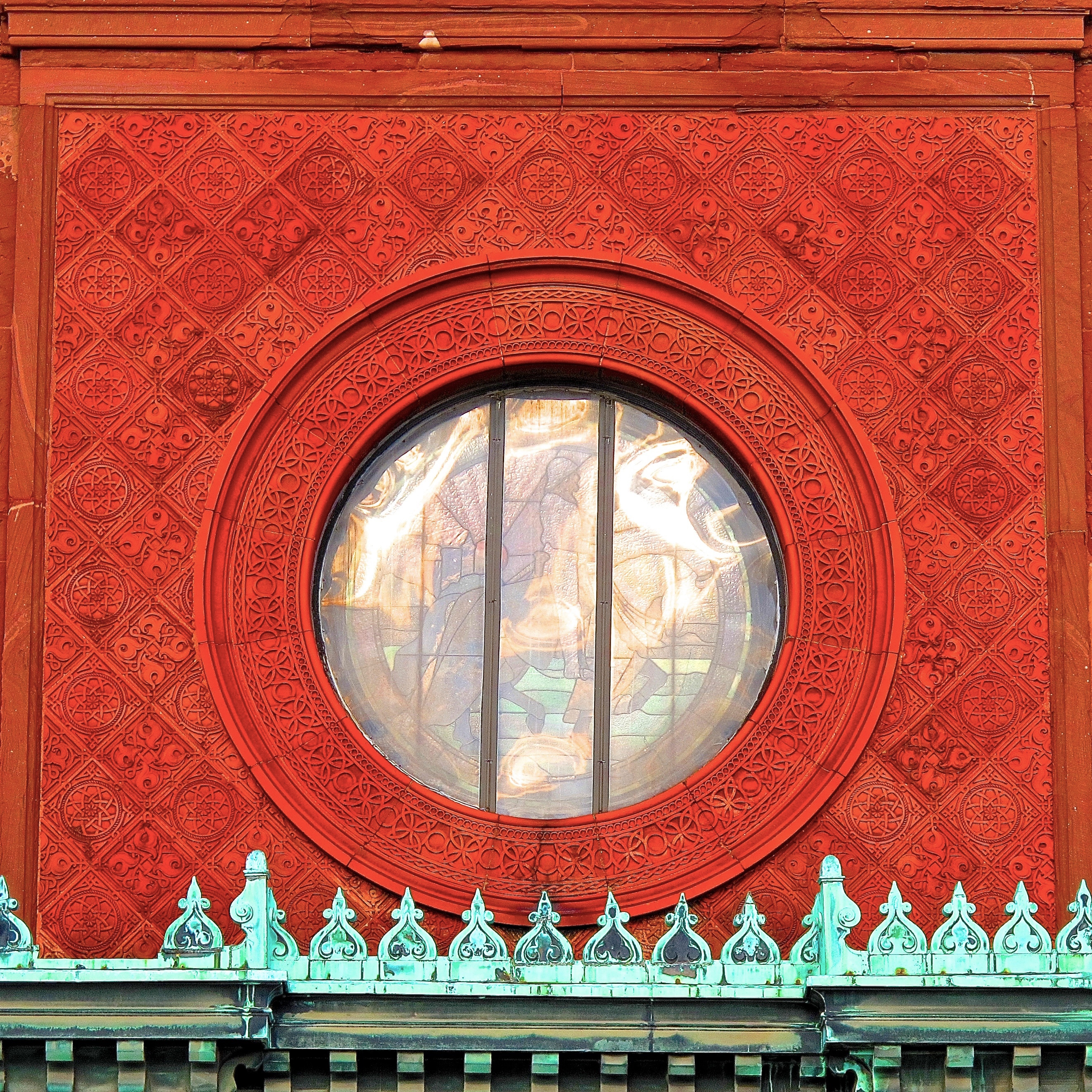
Round window
