= Trombley House =

- Tromble House
- U.S. National Register of Historic Places
- Michigan State Historic Site
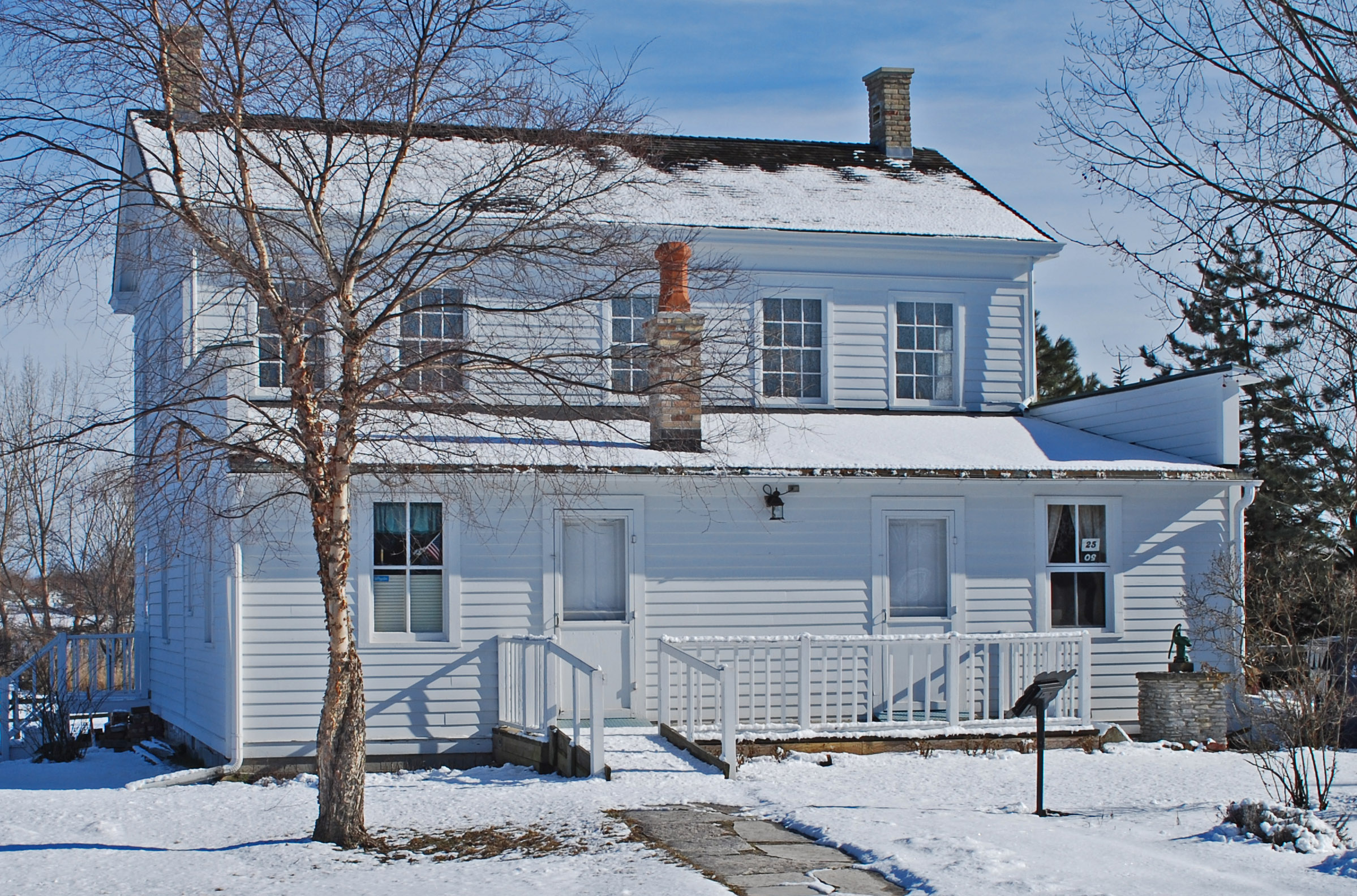

- Location within Michigan Location within the United States
- Interactive map
- Location: Veterans Memorial Park, Bay City, Michigan
- Coordinates: 43°35′28″N 83°53′59″W
- Area: less than one acre
- Built: 1835
- Built by: Nathan C. Case
- Architectural style: Greek Revival
- NRHP reference No.: 73000943
- Added to NRHP: January 25, 1973

The Trombley House (or Tromble House) was constructed as a house and trading post, and is now located at 901 John F. Kennedy. After being sent down the Saginaw River on a barge it is now located in Veterans Memorial Park in Bay City, Michigan. The building is also known as the Centre House (or Center House). It was listed on the National Register of Historic Places in 1973. It is the oldest frame house still standing in Bay County.

== History ==
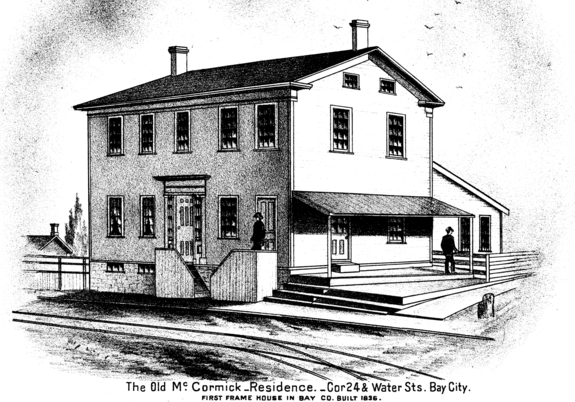
Trombley House c. 1883

Medor and Joseph Trombley, both French-Canadian fur traders, settled in the Saginaw Valley in the early 1830s and purchased large tracts of land along the Saginaw River between what is now Twenty-third Street and Cass Avenue in Bay City. In 1835, they began construction on this house, hiring Nathan C. Case, a carpenter, to construct it.

The house at that time was located on the east side of the river, at what is now 114-118 Webster Street. The house was completed in 1837. The Trombleys used the building as a house, as a place to conduct their trading business, and as an inn of sorts.

In the early 1840s, the Trombleys sold the house to James McCormick, Medor Trombley's father-in-law. McCormick remodeled it into a family residence, and lived there until his death in 1846. His wife Ellen continued to live there until her death in 1854. Medor Trombley and his wife Sara McCormick Trombley moved into the house in 1847.

After Ellen McCormick's death in 1854, Medor Trombley again took ownership of the house, and held onto it until 1899. During this time, the house also served as an inn or hotel, with out-of-town businessmen staying there. It was known variously as the "River House," the "Big House," or the "Centre House."

In 1899 the house passed to Medor's daughter Mary E. Rose. In 1905, she sold it to Frederick Johnson, and around this time the house was divided into three units. Over the next 75 years, the house changed ownership 12 more times. In 1981, the owner of the Trombley House wished to clear the site to make a parking lot for the adjacent business. Rather than being demolished, the house was ferried to the present location in Veterans Memorial Park on the other side of the Saginaw River.

The current site more accurately reflects the original setting of the house when it was constructed than the original site, now substantially industrial in nature, did. The house is currently being renovated under the guidance of the Trombley/Centre House Committee.

== Description ==
The Trombley House is a two-story rectangular frame Greek Revival structure, measuring 25-1/2 feet by 35-1/2 feet. It has a gabled roof. Each story of the front has five openings. The entrance is in the center, and is flanked with fluted pilasters and topped with a cornice.

== Trombley House site ==
According to McCormick family oral history, the original Webster Street location of the Trombley House was at the edge of extensive Indian mound containing skeletons, broken pottery, stone knives, stone axes, stone arrowheads, and stone spears. Some of these were donated by the McCormicks to several museums, including the Smithsonian Institution. Archaeological excavations at the site (designated 20BY70) were undertaken in 1981. These excavations found over 1000 historical artifacts, and also identified prehistoric artifacts. The prehistoric artifacts largely dated to the Late Woodland period (after 1000 AD, although some may be as early as pre-500 AD.
