= James Clements Municipal Airport =

Airport in Bay City, Michigan, US

- IATA: none; ICAO: none; FAA LID: 3CM

Summary
- Airport type: Public
- Owner: Bay City
- Serves: Bay City, Michigan
- Elevation AMSL: 585 ft (178 m)
- Coordinates: 43°32′49″N 083°53′44″W
- Website: www.BayCityMI.org/...

Map
- Location of airport in Michigan 3CM (the United States)

Runways
Direction	Length		Surface
Direction	ft	m	Surface
18/36	3,798	1,158	Asphalt
5/23	2,600	792	Asphalt
9W/27W	3,500	1,067	Water
18W/36W	3,500	1,067	Water
13W/31W	2,600	792	Water

Statistics (2021)
- Aircraft operations: 13,870
- Based aircraft: 44
- Source: Federal Aviation Administration
- James Clements Airport Administration Building
- U.S. National Register of Historic Places
- Michigan State Historic Site
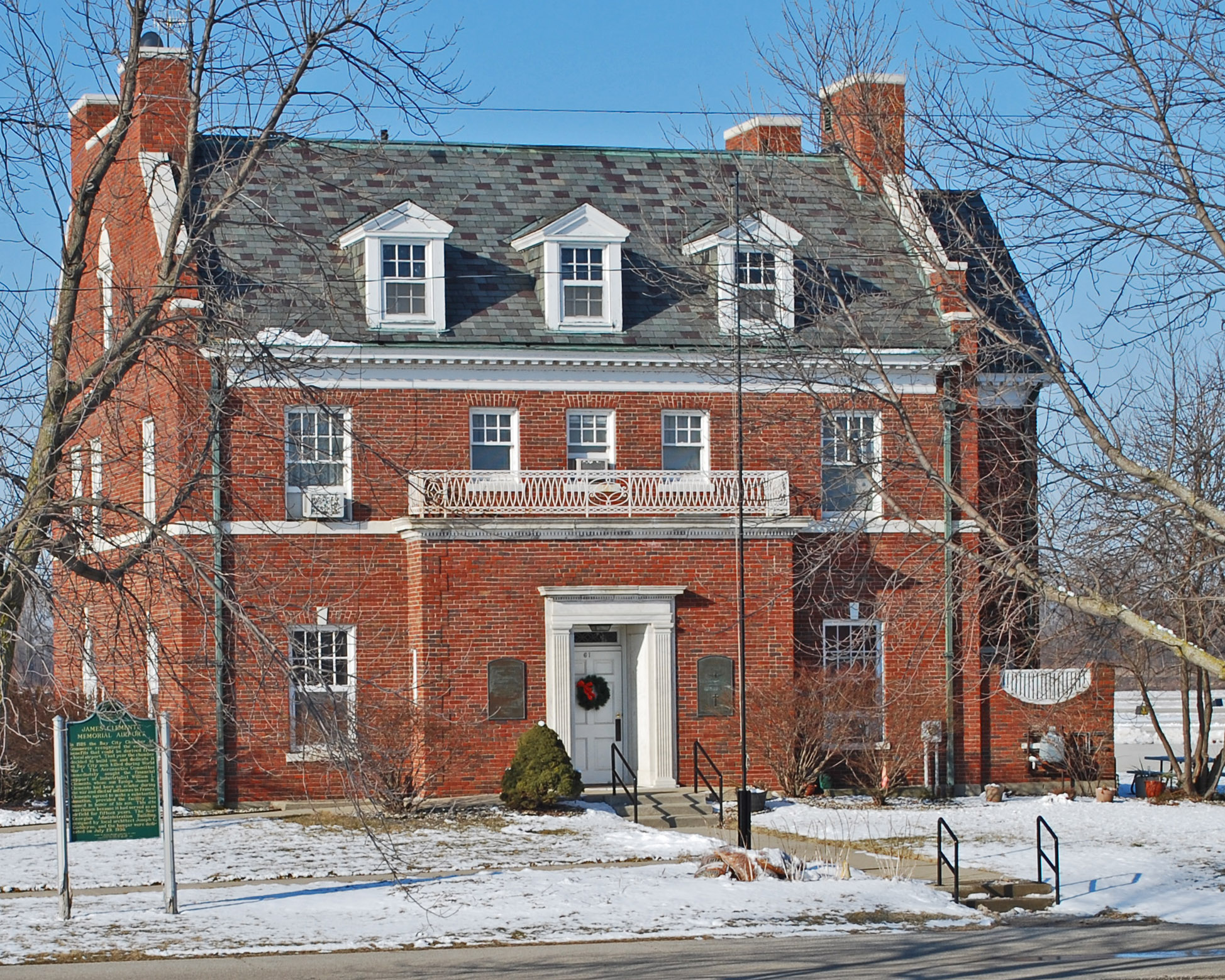
- Interactive map
- Location: Bay City, Michigan
- Coordinates: 43°32′52″N 83°53′31″W
- Built: 1929
- Built by: Webber Construction Co.
- Architect: Joseph C. Goddeyne
- Architectural style: Georgian Revival
- NRHP reference No.: 82000494

Significant dates
- Added to NRHP: November 22, 1982
- Designated MSHS: April 21, 1980

James Clements Municipal Airport (FAA LID: 3CM) is a city-owned, public-use airport located three nautical miles (6 km) south of the central business district of Bay City, in Bay County, Michigan, United States. It is included in the Federal Aviation Administration (FAA) National Plan of Integrated Airport Systems for 2017–2021, in which it is categorized as a local general aviation facility. It is also a seaplane base with landing areas on the Saginaw River, adjacent to the airport.

The airport was dedicated in 1930 in commemoration of Bay City pilots who gave their lives for their country in military service. The Georgian Revival Administration Building became part of to the National Register of Historic Places in 1982, and houses a collection of photographs of those pilots.

It is home port for local chapters of the Civil Air Patrol and the Experimental Aircraft Association. Also centered there is the Valley Aero Club (which celebrates Father's Day with an annual fly-in breakfast in early June, and hosts an air show in August).

Wetlands on the airport's edges are home to the cream-colored Eastern Prairie fringed orchid, which is a threatened and rare wildflower.

== History ==
In 1912, three pilots built and flew a Wright Flyer No. 15 on the field that eventually became the airport.

The first airport in the Saginaw Valley was opened in 1913 by Lionel DeRemer, and included land that is now part of the James Clemens airport. DeRemer also established a flying school that same year; one of his first students was mechanic Henry Dora. Dora's flying career was interrupted by World War I, but after his return he purchased a surplus Curtiss JN-4 and began barnstorming. He also began advocating for the establishment of a permanent and well-equipped airport for Bay City. His idea found fertile ground, as a number of young Bay City businessmen had also served in World War I and recognized the potential of airplanes in peacetime. The Bay City Chamber of Commerce began to promote the project in 1923, but the idea languished until 1926, when the suggestion was made to dedicate a new airport to the young men from Bay City who had lost their lives in World War I.

The Chamber of Commerce reached out to William L. Clements, a wealthy local industrialist and a regent of the University of Michigan, where he had already funded construction of the William L. Clements Library. Clement's son James had been a naval aviator in World War I, and had died in France of influenza. Clements offered to donate $10,000 for the construction of an airport, asking that it be named for his son. Other local businessmen donated money, including James E. Davidson and O.E. Sovereign. Construction began immediately under the direction of Henry Dora. The landing field and hangar were completed and officially dedicated in 1928, and planes began using the facility. Especially noteworthy was the commencement of airmail flights at the airport. The administration building was completed in 1930, and the city sponsored a dedication ceremony that year.

In the 1930s, the airport was used by the First Pursuit Group from the modern-day Selfridge Air National Guard Base to allow pilots to simulate attack runs over the industrial areas of Flint.

Regular passenger service from the airport began in 1931, and although the first company to offer the service went out of business, air routes were well established by 1935. Henry Dora continued as the airport manager until 1942, living in the administration building and hosting visits from aviators including Eddie Stinson, Clarence Chamberlain, Eddie Rickenbacker, and Walter J. Carr. The Clements Airport remained in use under the direction of other airport managers.

In 2020, a number of upgrades were made to the airport to extend the life of its runway by 10–15 years. More plans are in the works to attract additional traffic to the airport. Special emphasis is made on continual resurfacing of runways and taxiways.

As of 2018, a study by the Michigan Department of Transportation found the airport contributes $8 million to the local economy and $10 million total statewide, with each visitor the airport spending an average of $248 in the area.

The airport is today home to a variety of events and attractions. It hosts a pancake breakfast fly-in each Father's Day. There is also a regular aerobatics competition featuring antique aircraft performing aerobatics.

== Facilities and aircraft ==
James Clements Municipal Airport covers an area of 266 acres (108 ha) at an elevation of 585 feet (178 m) above mean sea level. It has two asphalt paved runways: 18/36 is 3,798 by 75 feet (1,158 x 23 m) and 5/23 is 2,600 by 75 feet (792 x 23 m). It also has three seaplane landing areas on water: 9W/27W is 3,500 by 500 feet (1,067 x 152 m); 13W/31W is 2,600 by 400 feet (792 x 122 m); 18W/36W is 3,500 by 500 feet (1,067 x 152 m).

For the 12-month period ending December 31, 2021, the airport had 13,870 general aviation aircraft operations, an average of 38 per day. It includes almost 100% general aviation and <1% military. At that time there were 44 aircraft based on the field: 41 single-engine and 2 multi-engine airplanes as well as 1 helicopter.

The airport sells fuel through its city-operated fixed-base operator.

== James Clements Airport Administration Building ==
The James Clements Airport Administration Building was designed by local Bay City architect Joseph C. Goddeyne, and constructed by the Webber Construction Company in 1929–30. It was designated a Michigan State Historic Site in 1980 and listed on the National Register of Historic Places in 1982.

The building is a 2 1/2-story, three bay brick Georgian Revival structure measuring 40 feet by 48 feet. The first floor has a projecting entry bay with a six panel door topped by a leaded glass transom. Fluted pilasters, a frieze, and a cornice surround the entrance. Two plaques flank the entrance, one commemorating the men who died in World War I and the other memorializing James Renville Clements. A single double-hung eight-over-one window is set on each side of the door. The second story contains three small six-over-one double-hung sash window units in the center bay, with windows similar to those on the first floor to each side. A wood cornice rins across the top. The gable roof is covered with slate., and contains three dormers with six-over-six double-hung windows.

The interior includes the main foyer, a large lounge, a manager's office, an airport office, and restrooms on the first level. The second floor contains the airport manager's apartment, with a first aid room, two bedrooms, a kitchen, a dining room, and a living room. The upper level is only partially finished. It was originally meant as a dormitory for pilots. The building includes a full basement with utilities and storerooms.

== Accidents and incidents ==
- On August 5, 1983, a Canadian-registered Piper PA-28 Cherokee crashed at the airport.
- On June 7, 1987, an Mbb BO-105CBS crashed in Bay City.
- On August 2, 2008, a Beech H35 Bonanza landed with its landing gear retracted. During the recovery of the aircraft, it was found the cockpit landing gear control handle was down and no landing gear circuit breakers were tripped. When the master switch was turned on, the landing gear extended and its indicators showed the gear was extended and locked. The probable cause of the accident was found to be an inadvertent wheels up landing resulting from unfollowed checklists.
- On August 30, 2008, a Cessna 150 crashed into a cornfield while on approach to the airport. The pilot reported that the engine "stumbled and quit" 3 miles out and, while he was able to momentarily restart the engine, it eventually quit again. The probable cause of the accident was loss of engine power due to carburetor icing.
- On July 6, 2019, a plane crashed while on approach to the airport. The pilot, who flew for Air America Aerial Ads, was in critical condition after the crash.

== See also ==
- List of airports in Michigan
