= City Hall (Bay City, Michigan) =

- U.S. National Register of Historic Places
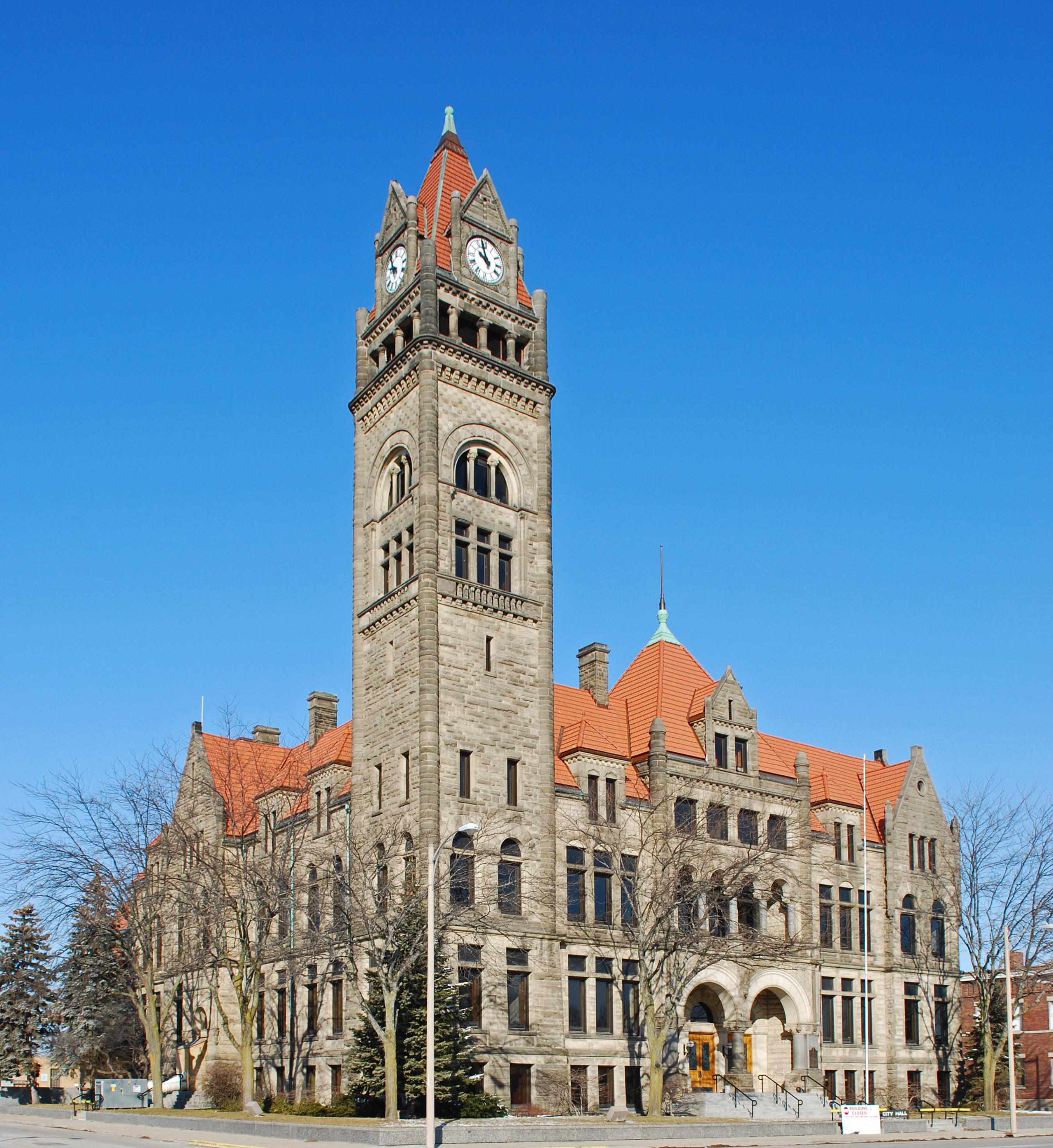

- Location within Michigan Location within the United States
- Interactive map
- Location: 301 Washington St., Bay City, Michigan
- Coordinates: 43°35′36″N 83°53′21″W
- Area: less than one acre
- Built: 1897
- Architect: Pratt & Koeppe
- Architectural style: Romanesque, Richardsonian Romanesque
- NRHP reference No.: 75000936
- Added to NRHP: July 18, 1975

The Bay City Hall is a government building located at 301 Washington Street in Bay City, Michigan. It was listed on the National Register of Historic Places in 1975.

== History ==
The original settlers in what now is Bay City arrived in the 1830s. By 1857, fourteen sawmills were located along the Saginaw River, and after the Civil War both lumbering and shipbuilding continued strongly. In 1889, voters approved the construction of a new city hall. In 1892, local architects Leverett A. Pratt and Walter Koeppe were hired to design the structure, and the cornerstone was laid in 1894. The building was completed by the summer of 1897 at a cost of $175,000.

The building was used by the city through the 20th century, with a major renovation in 1975. In 2010, a major re-tiling of the roof was undertaken, but a construction incident caused a large fire. The building was closed for 3 years, and an extensive, $10 million renovation performed. It was reopened in 2013, and still serves the city.

== Description ==
The Bay City Hall is a Richardsonian Romanesque building constructed of Indiana limestone, sandstone, and granite, measuring approximately 120 feet by 200 feet. The multi-gabled roof is tiled, and a large sandstone tower, nearly 180 feet high, is located at the southeast corner. The tower is topped with a gable roof with spires, and contains a large clock with separate dial faces on each of its four sides. The windows in the building are flat-headed units set in round arches, and are divided by heavy stone mullions. The entrance is through a huge double Romanesque arch, decorated with an elaborate stucco bas-relief, and sheltered with an arched porch supported by polished stone columns.

The interior is dominated by a large central stairwell, illuminated by skylights, with an elaborately scrolled cast iron banister.
