= Veterans Memorial Bridge (Bay City, Michigan) =

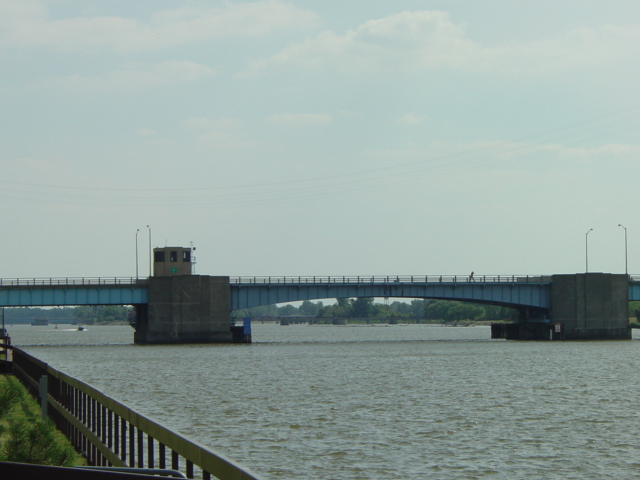
- Coordinates: 43°35′46.65″N 83°53′37.02″W
- Carries: M-25 / BS I-75
- Crosses: Saginaw River
- Locale: Bay City, Michigan
- Official name: Veterans Memorial Bridge
- Maintained by: Michigan Department of Transportation

Characteristics
- Design: Bascule bridge
- Total length: 916 Feet

History
- Opened: 1957

Statistics
- Toll: None

The Veterans Memorial Bridge is a drawbridge located in Bay City, Michigan. It carries State Highway M-25 and Business Spur I-75 over the Saginaw River. Its location is just south of Wenonah Park (on the east side of the river), and Veteran's Park (on the west side).

== History ==
The Veterans Memorial Bridge opened in 1957, the same year as the Mackinac Bridge. It was also Bay City's first four-lane bridge. The bridge was built to carry a rerouted section of M-25 (which was also concurrent with U.S. Route 23 Business (US 23 Bus.) up until 1960) over the Saginaw River. These route designations previously crossed the river a short distance north on the Third Street Bridge. Despite the reroute, the Third Street Bridge would remain in service until its collapse in 1976 and would be physically replaced by the Liberty Bridge.

The Veterans Memorial Bridge was temporarily closed to road traffic on July 7, 2012, for the Bay City Fireworks Festival. Over 5,000 shells were launched from the surface of the bridge in celebration of Independence Day.
