= Midland Street Commercial District =

- U.S. National Register of Historic Places
- U.S. Historic district
- Michigan State Historic Site
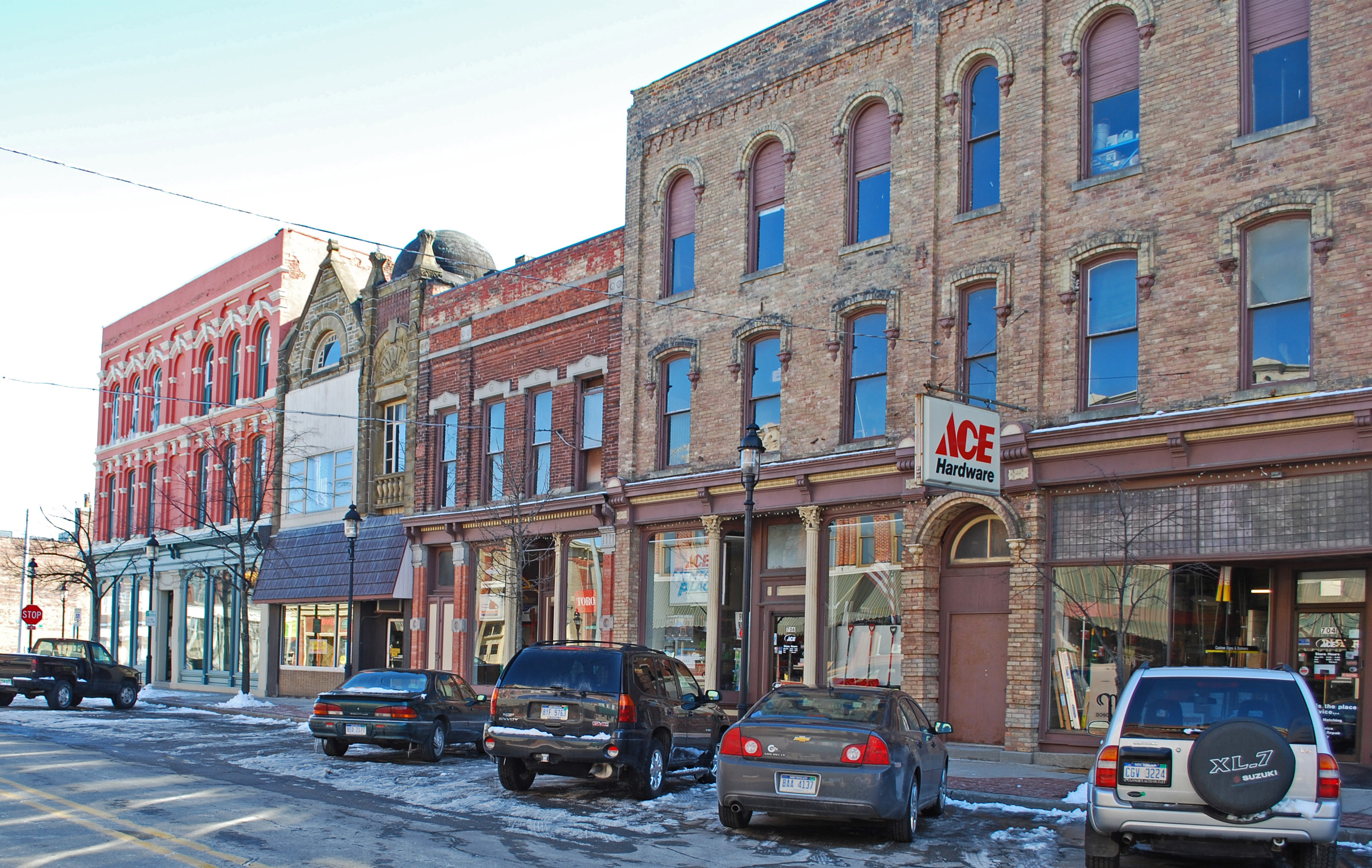
- SW Corner of Midland and Walnut

- Location within Michigan Location within the United States
- Interactive map showing the location of Midland Street Commercial District
- Location: Roughly bounded by John, Vermont, Catherine and Litchfield Sts., Bay City, Michigan
- Coordinates: 43°36′6″N 83°53′57″W
- Area: 9 acres (3.6 ha)
- Architectural style: Colonial Revival, Late Victorian, Art Deco
- NRHP reference No.: 82002827
- Added to NRHP: April 22, 1982

The Midland Street Commercial District is a primarily commercial historic district located primarily along Midland Street, between Catherine and Litchfield Streets, in Bay City, Michigan. It was listed on the National Register of Historic Places in 1982.

== History ==
The west side of Bay City was developed much later than the east side. While the east side was settled in the late 1830s, it was not until 1863 that Henry Sage and Henry McGraw established a sawmill on the west side. They platted the small town of Wenona and began selling lots. Growth came quickly: by 1865 a plank road to Midland and a second road to Saginaw were opened, and the Third Street Bridge connecting Wenona to Bay City was constructed. By 1866 Wenona had over 1000 residents, and in 1867 a railroad line was laid, and the first brick building on Midland Street was built. Wenona and Midland Street became a railroad and commercial hub.

However, by the turn of the century, the lumbering which had been an economic base was declining, and in 1903 the west side of the river was incorporated into Bay City, causing economic activity to slowly move to the east side of the river. Growth along Midland Street during the first part of the twentieth century was slow, and halted completely at the onset of the Great Depression. Because of this, the section of Midland Street remains much as it did in 1929.

== Description ==
The Midland Street Commercial District is four blocks long, and contains fifty structures, forty-nine of which are two- and three- story commercial buildings, and forty-four of which contribute to the historic character of the neighborhood. Structures date from the 1860s to 1929, and styles include Queen Anne, Romanesque Revival, and Art Deco.

Significant structures in the district include:

- The Loose Block - 601-603 Midland Street. Built in 1879, this three-story structure is a commercial adaptation of the Queen Anne style, containing stone, tile, terra cotta, and brick detailing. It was built for William Loose, a casket maker and undertaker.
- The Lumberman's State Bank- 701 Midland Street. Spencer O. Fisher and Captain James Davidson founded the Lumberman's State Bank, and in 1881 constructed this three story, three bay brick building to house the bank.
- The Fisher Block - 705-7-9-13 Midland Street. In 1881, a fire destroyed the buildings at this location, and in 1883 Spencer O. Fisher built this large Italianate-styled building.
- The Lewis Block - 510-512 Midland Street. This building, two story building was constructed in about 1890.
- The Westown Theater - 611 Midland Street . This Art Deco theater was constructed in 1915 on the site of an earlier commercial building.
- The People 1s National Bank - 509 Midland Street. This two story, three bay red brick Georgian Revival building was built in 1923 as the Bay County Savings Bank.

== Gallery ==
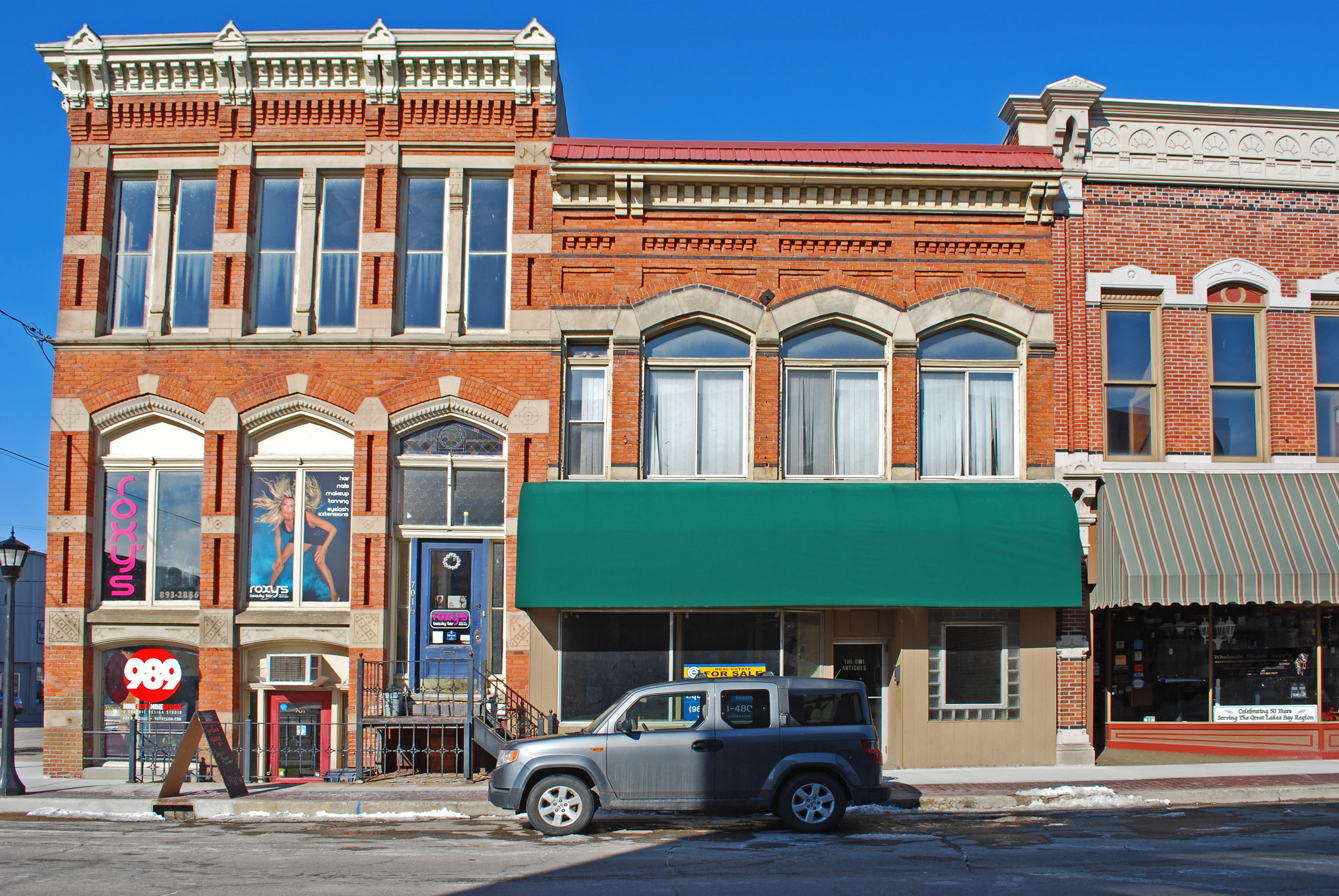
NE Corner of Midland and Linn

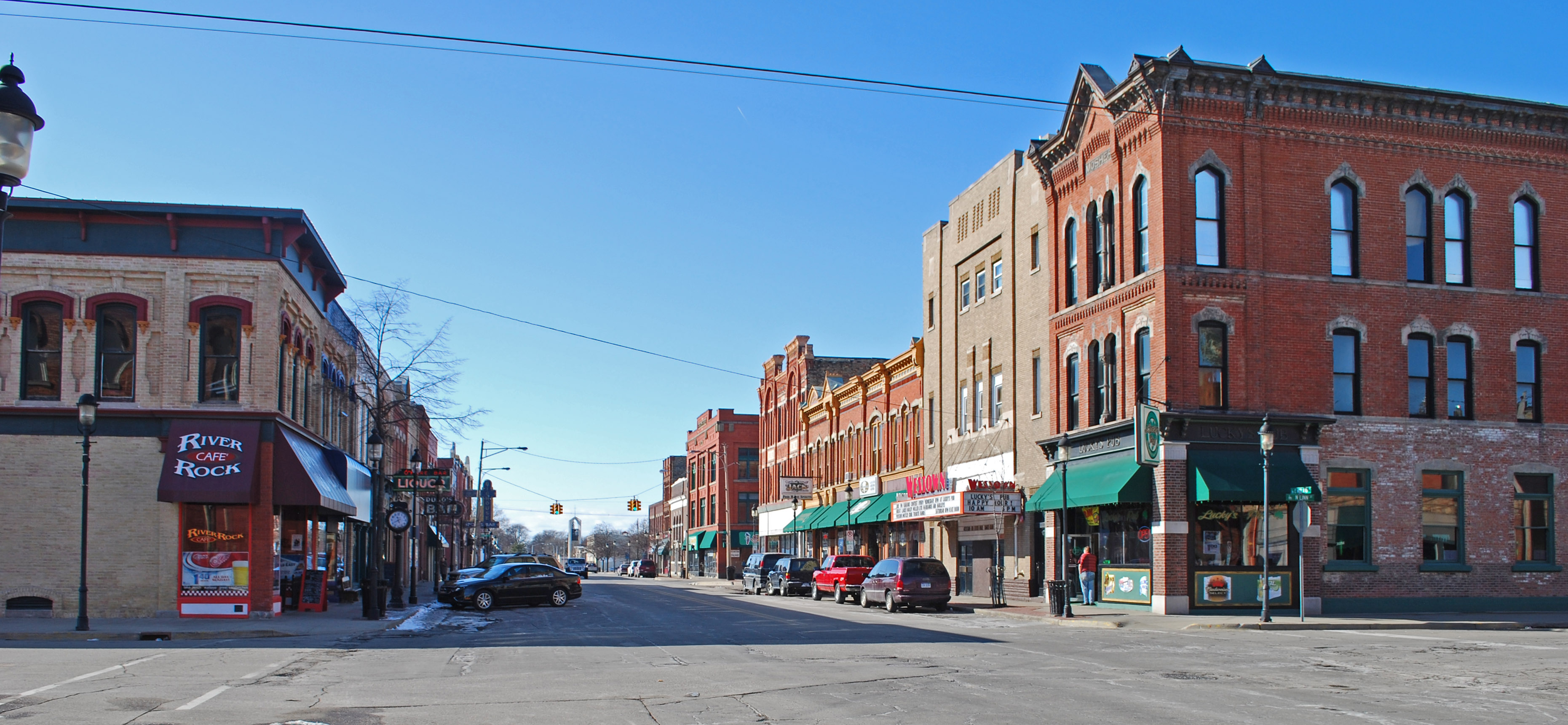
Midland, looking west, at Linn
