= Mercy Hospital and Elizabeth McDowell Bialy Memorial House =

- U.S. National Register of Historic Places
- Michigan State Historic Site
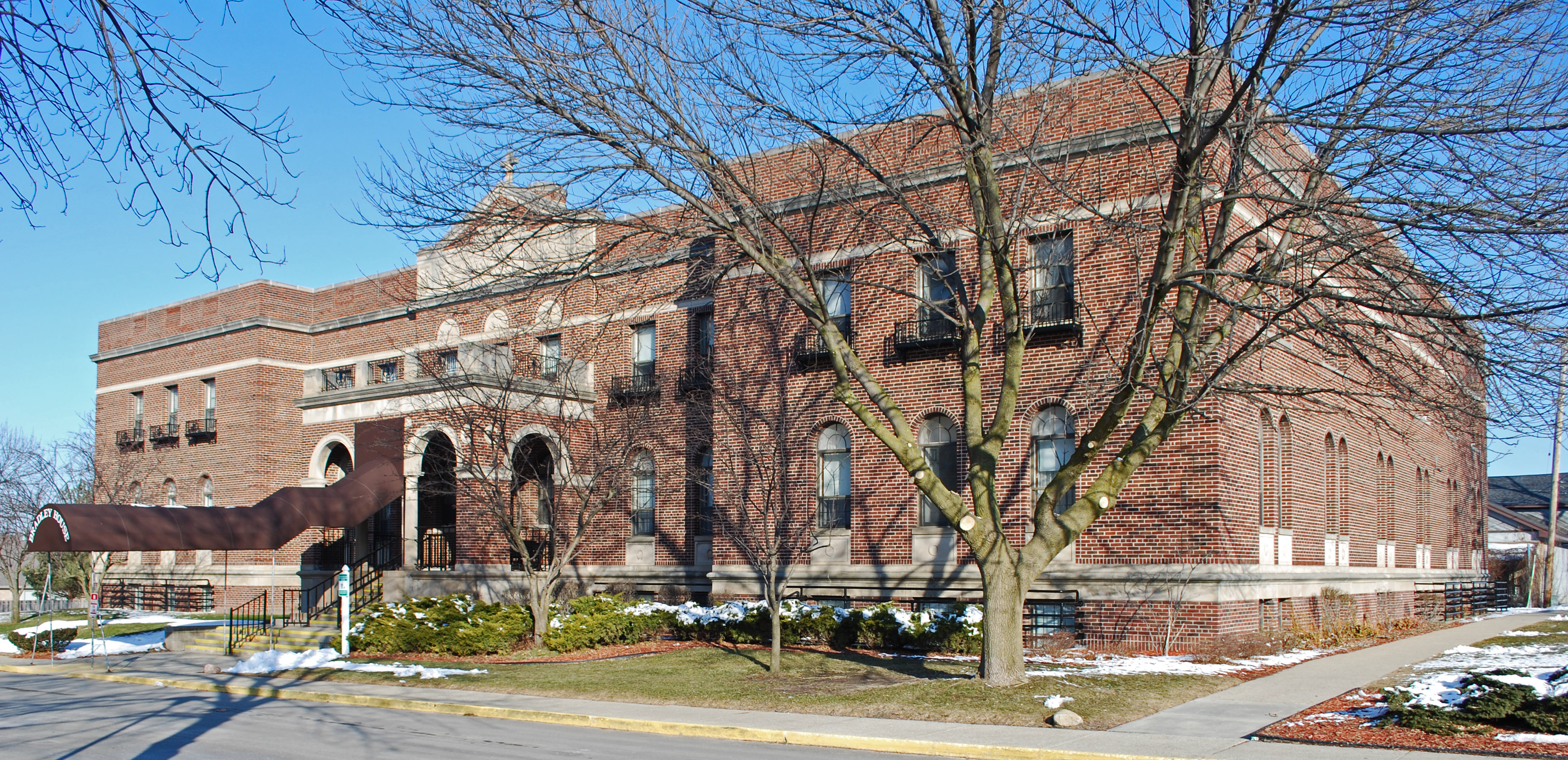
- Elizabeth McDowell Bialy Memorial House

- Location within Michigan Location within the United States
- Interactive map
- Location: 15th and Water Sts., Bay City, Michigan
- Coordinates: 43°35′11″N 83°53′34″W
- Area: 5.6 acres (2.3 ha)
- Built: 1880
- Architect: Charles Sullivan, others
- Architectural style: Late 19th And 20th Century Revivals, Second Renaissance Revival
- NRHP reference No.: 80001848
- Added to NRHP: April 22, 1980

Mercy Hospital and the Elizabeth McDowell Bialy Memorial House are two associated buildings located at 15th and Water Streets in Bay City, Michigan. They were listed on the National Register of Historic Places in 1980. As of 2018, the structures are operated as the Bradley House, a low income apartment complex.

== History ==
Nathan B. Bradley was a lumber baron living in Bay City. In about 1880, he constructed a large brick house at this location, which was at the time near the lumber mills on the waterfront. However, by the late 1890s, his prominence in the community meant that the home's location no longer served his social needs. In 1898, Sister Mary Hilda of the Sisters of Mercy came to Bay City to establish a hospital, beginning a program of public subscription to fund the venture. In 1899, Bradley offered the order his home at a greatly reduced price to house the hospital. Sister Mary Hilda accepted, and spent one-and-one-half years equipping the hospital, opening it on September 20, 1900.

In 1905, the Sisters raised $17000 to construct a new three-story addition to the hospital. Soon afterward, another $75,000 was raised for a new four-story addition, which opened in 1911. An even larger wing was added in 1917, and featured a variety of progressive new medical facilities, such as a diet kitchen and a pediatric section.

In 1927, Mendel J. Bialy, a wealthy local Bay City manufacturer, offered the Sisters $350,000 for construction of a nurses residence in memory of his wife, Elizabeth McDowell Bialy. The two story brick structure opened in mid-1927, as housing for the students in Mercy's nursing program. In 1948, a large new five story multi-colored brick addition was opened. This brought the hospital's bed total to 335, the largest in the state outside of Detroit. By this time, the original Bradley residence was in seriously bad repair. Patients were moved out in 1948, leaving the chapel as the only occupant. In 1957, the building was razed to make room for the ambulance entrance.

However, despite the progressive programs and fine medical care provided, by the mid-1960s the hospital started to face a number of serious problems. Municipal hospitals in Bay City were competing for patients, and the debts incurred for the 1948 addition were problematic. The Mercy School of Nursing closed in 1965 because it was unable to attract students. In 1972, the State Board of Hospital Licensing placed Mercy Hospital on probation. The hospital was never able to overcome these problems and closed in 1977. In 1978, the Hospital merged with the Bay City Medical Center.

Both the hospital and the Bialy house were renovated into a housing complex in 1980-81.

== Description ==
The Mercy Hospital and Elizabeth McDowell Bialy Memorial House consists of two brick structures located near each other. The hospital is composed of four major, connected building segments dating from 1905, 1911, 1917, and 1948, ranging in height from two-and-one-half to five stories. Each building segment is separately symmetrical in massing and fenestration, but as connected presents an asymmetrical roofline and floorplan. The 1905 section is a 2-1/2 story brick structure, two bays wide, with a hipped roof.

The 1911 section is four stories tall and five bays wide, a pressed metal cornice spanning only the center bay and the side piers of the building. The 1917 section is a four-story building with a three-bay entry facade containing a center door in a projecting brick vestibule. The upper three floors have more elaborate ornamentation, with projecting sections and limestone corners. The 1948 section is a large five-story multi-colored brick structure with a steel and concrete structural system. The ground floor and exposed basement is separated from the upper floors with a wide brick and molded stone bandcourse. The main entryway is through recessed double doors with a fluted and molded limestone surround. The upper stories have limestone piers and are topped with a wide stone fascia.

The Bialy Nurses Residence is a two-story, three bay U-shaped Second Renaissance Revival structure made of brick and steel sheathed in brick. The basement is concrete with a limestone facing. The building is symmetrical with rounded arch windows on the first floor level, and an arcaded porch protecting the entryway.

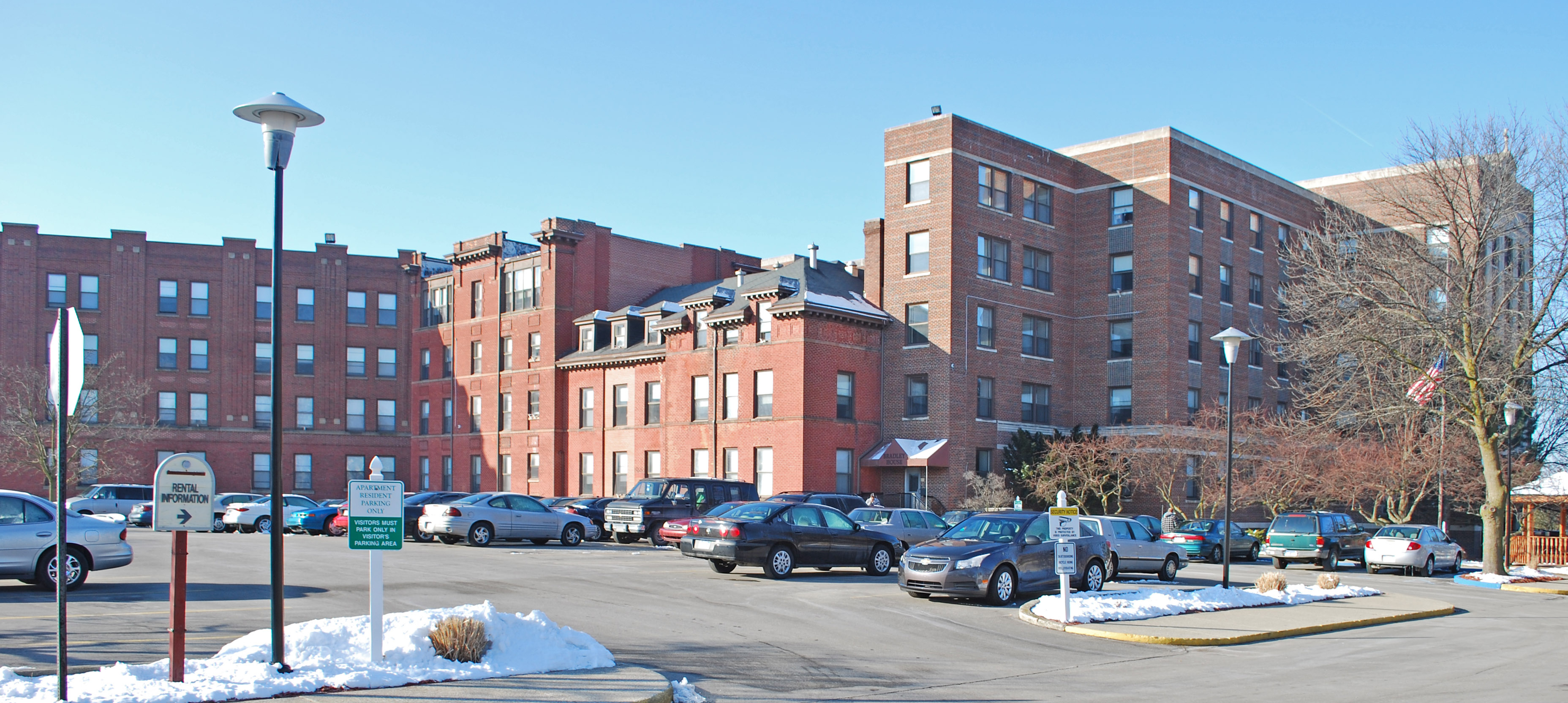
Mercy Hospital Complex
