= Central Michigan =

Coordinates: 43°34′54.5″N 84°46′32.5″W

Mid Michigan
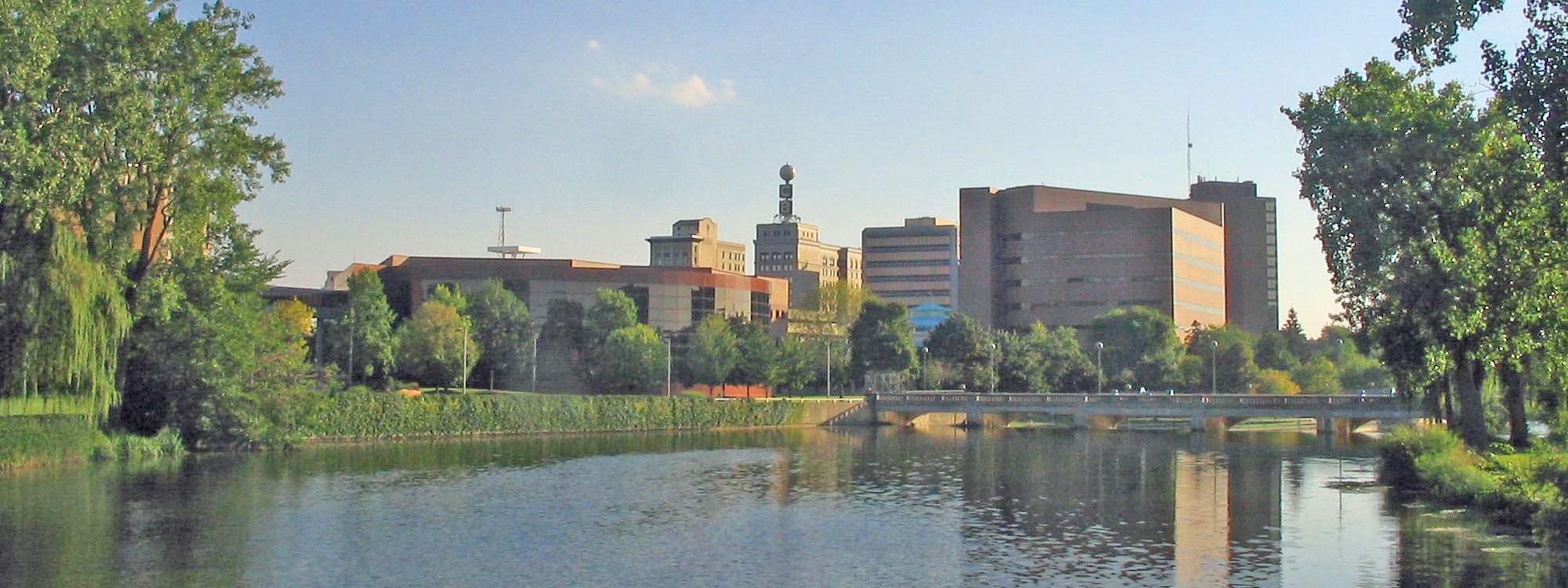
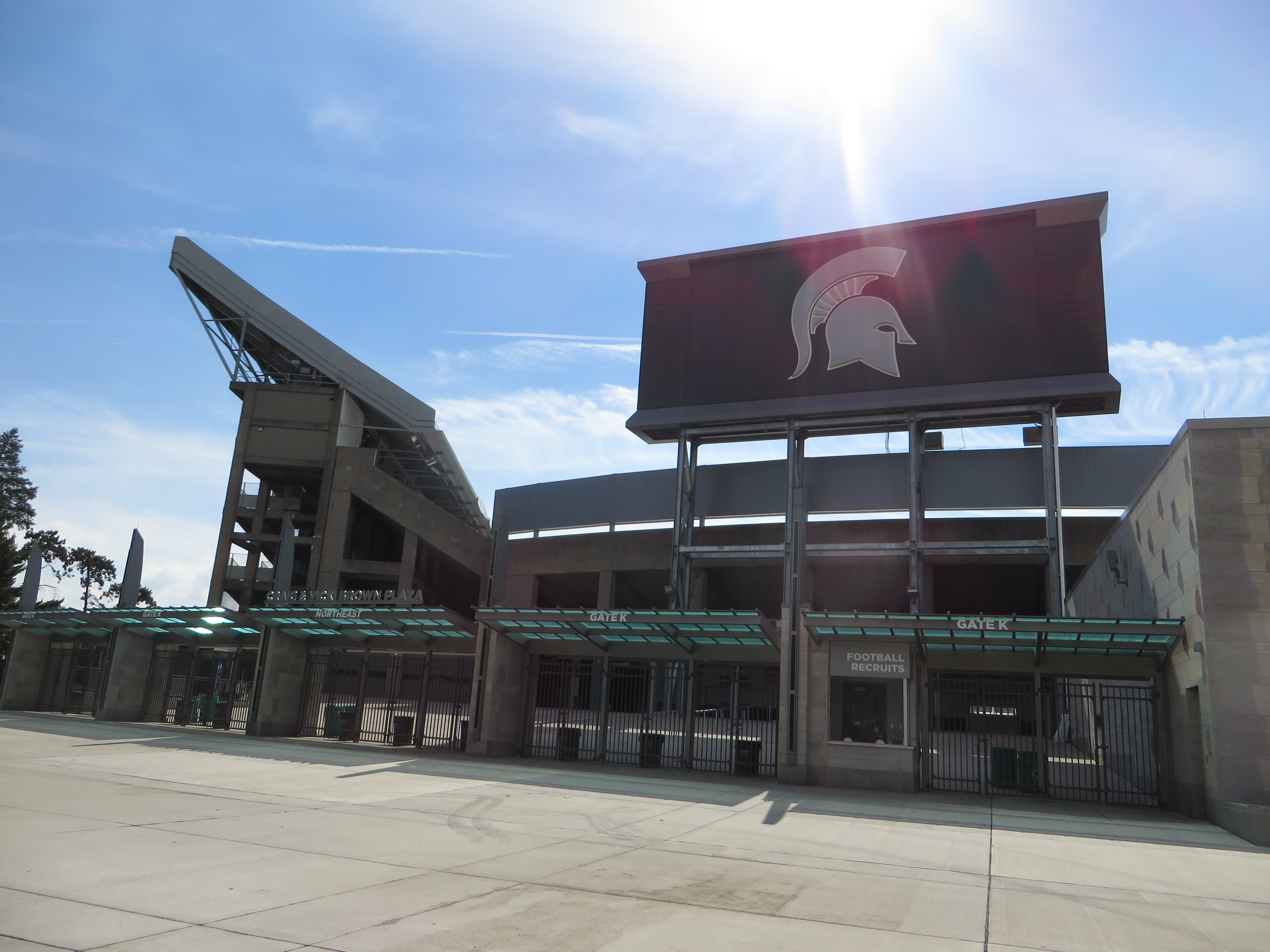
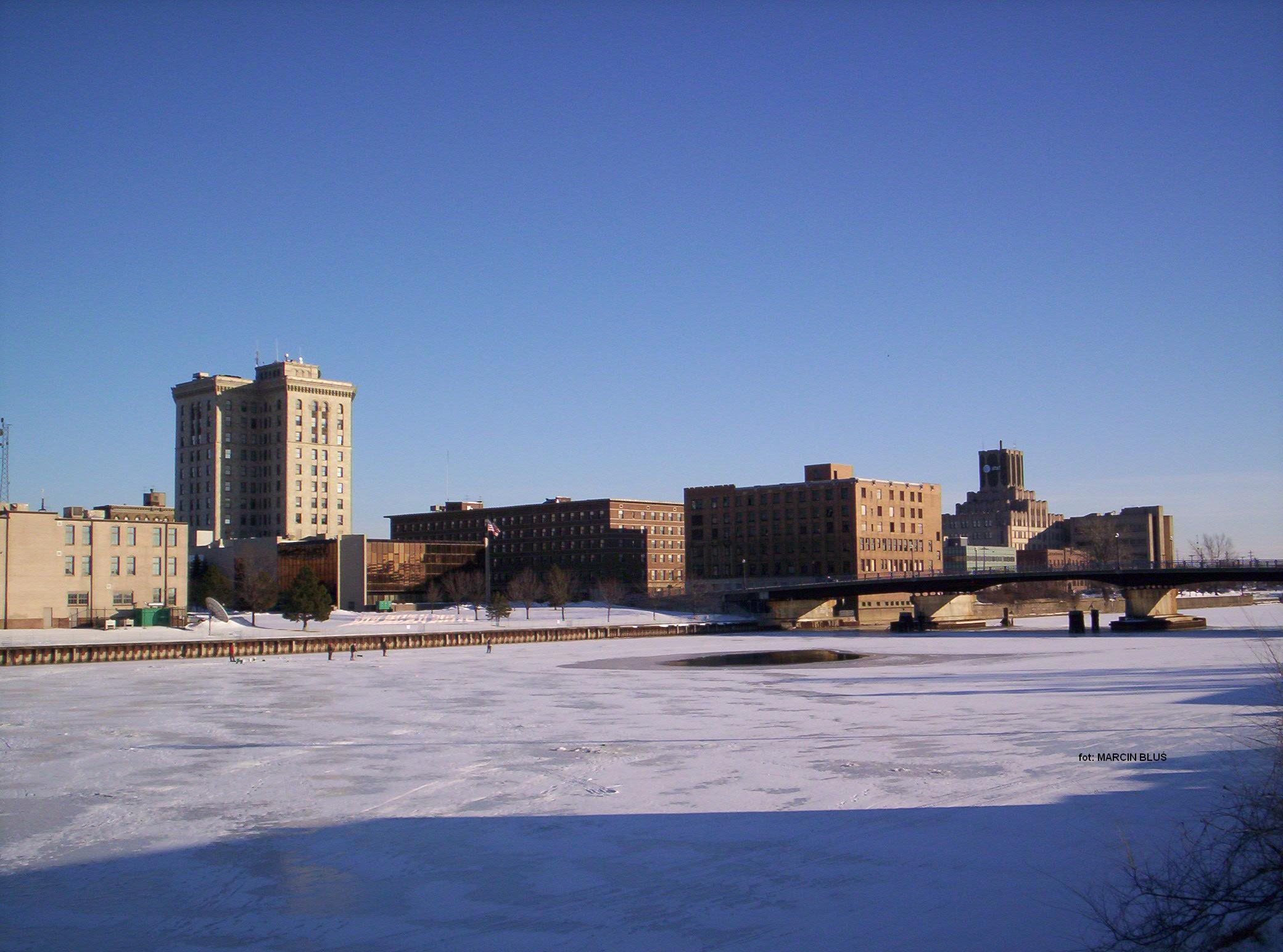
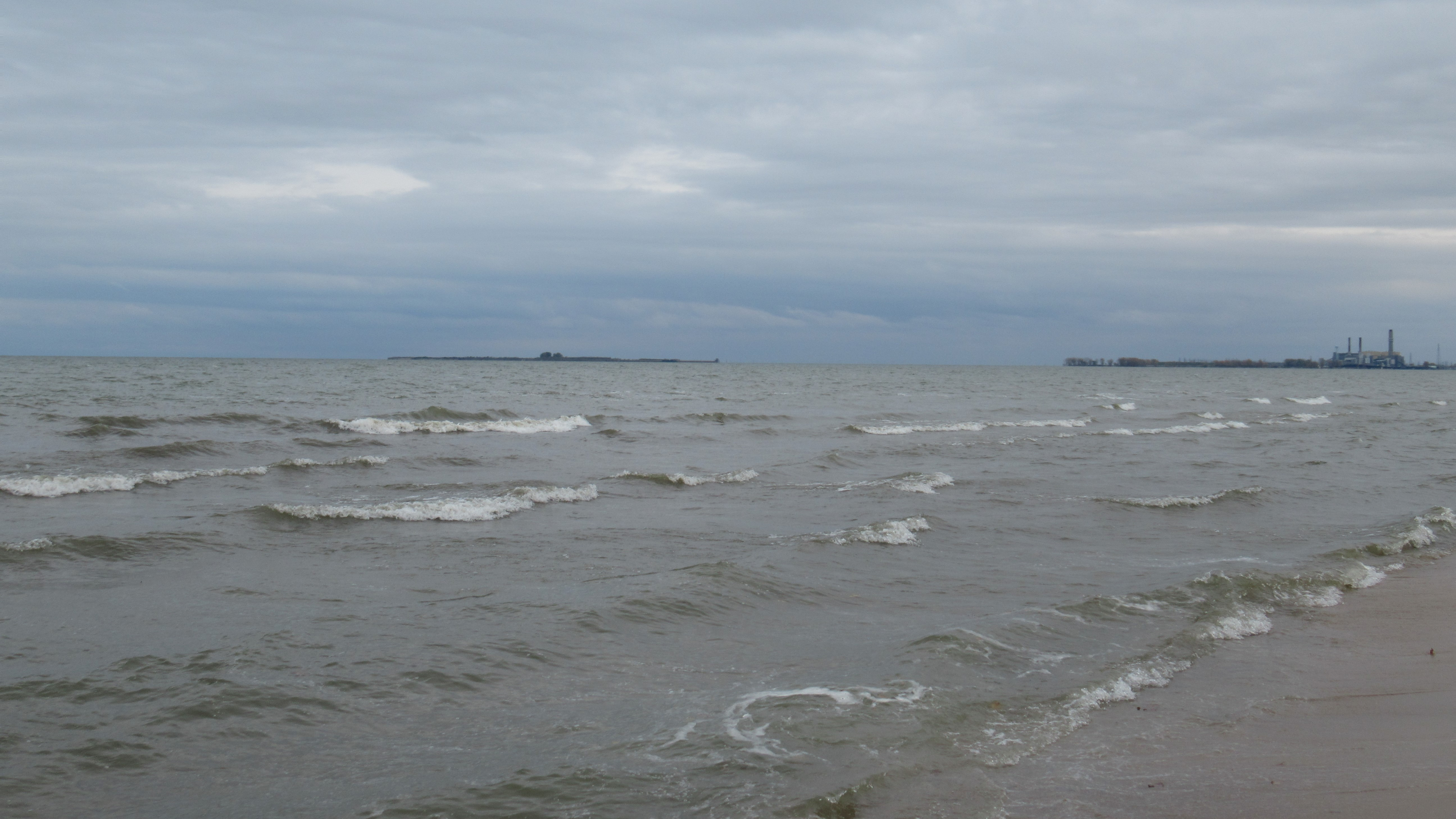
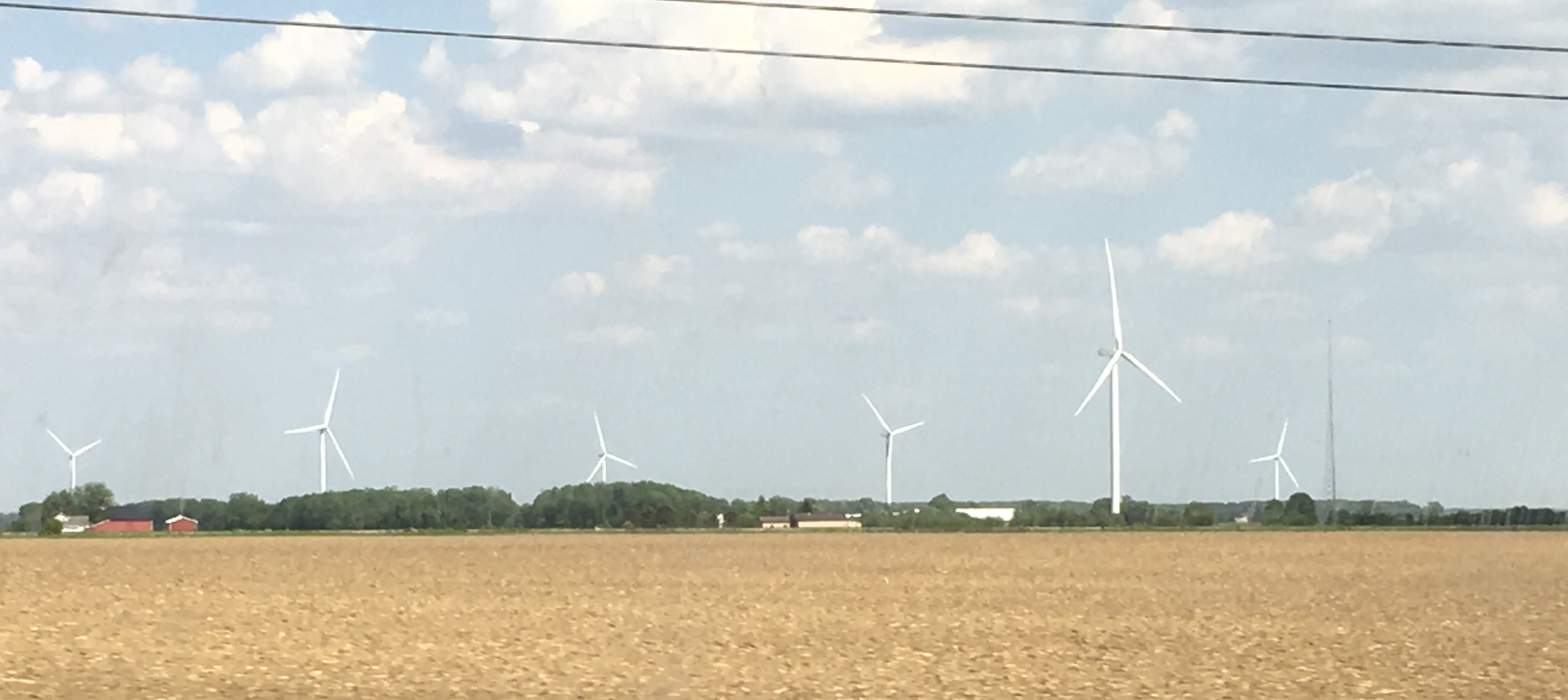
- Flint Spartan Stadium Saginaw Coastline of Saginaw Bay Wind farms near Ithaca

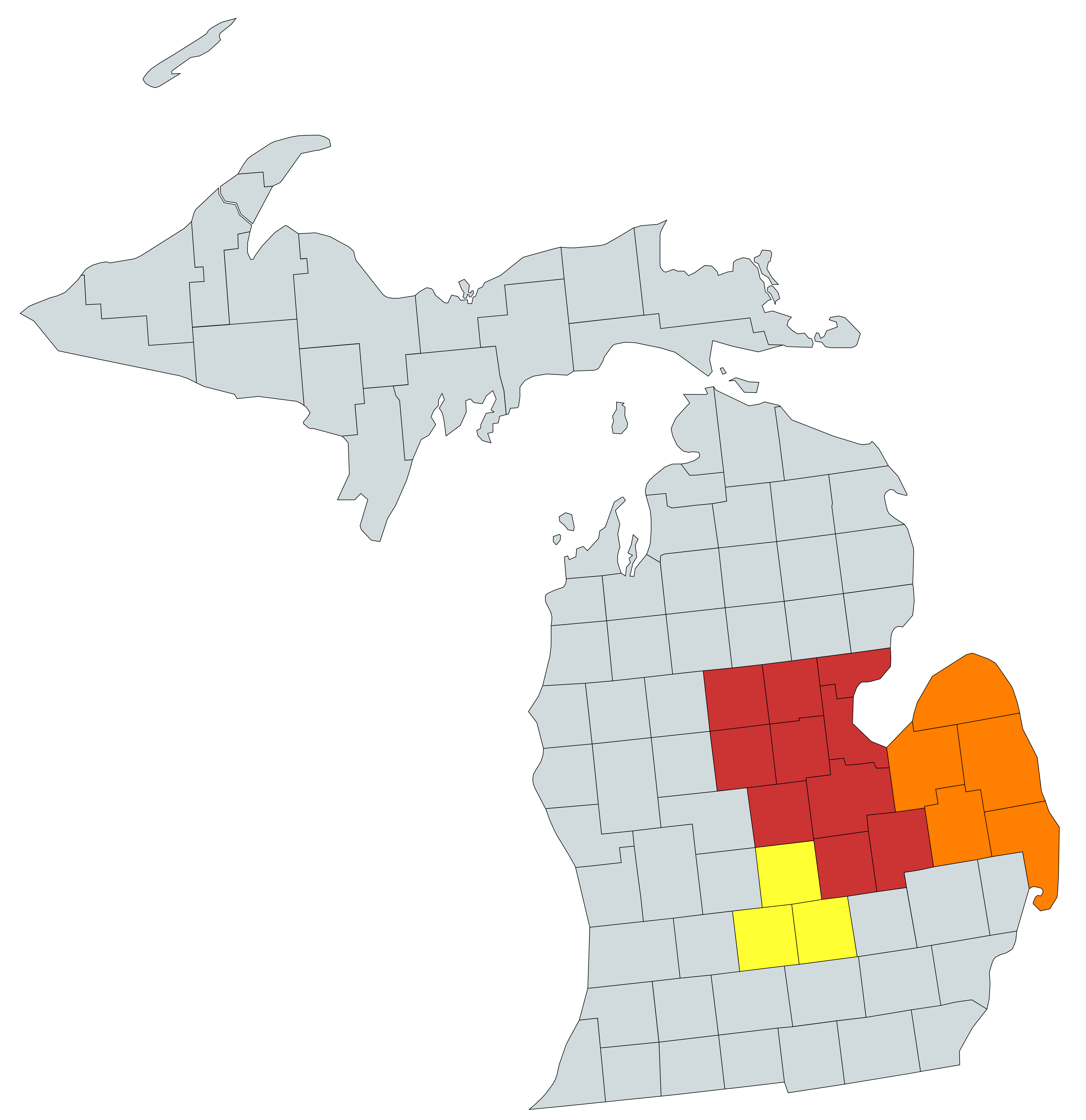
- Mid Michigan Counties highlighted in red, with the Lansing area in yellow, and The Thumb in Orange
- Country: United States
- State: Michigan
- Largest city: Lansing
- Time zone: UTC−05:00 (Eastern)
  - Summer (DST): UTC−04:00 (EDT)
- Area codes: 517, 810, 989

Central Michigan, also called Mid Michigan, is a region in the Lower Peninsula of the U.S. state of Michigan. As the name indicates, it is the middle area of the Lower Peninsula. Lower Michigan is said to resemble a mitten, and Mid Michigan corresponds roughly to the thumb and palm, stretching from Michigan's eastern shoreline along Lake Huron into the fertile rolling plains of the Michigan Basin. The region contains cities of moderate size, including Flint, Saginaw, and the state capital of Lansing. Generally Central, or "Mid", Michigan is defined by governmental organizations as an area North of Jackson, and South of Clare.

== Definitions ==
For the most part, Central Michigan and Mid Michigan are synonymous with each other, representing generally the same geographic area of Michigan. However, some definitions of Central Michigan and Mid Michigan can vary significantly, depending on one's point of reference.

- The Greater Lansing area, sometimes called the Capitol Region, includes the area surrounding the state capitol of Lansing and nearby East Lansing.
- The Greater Tri-Cities area, also called the Great Lakes Bay Region, is the area surrounding the Saginaw Bay including the cities of Saginaw, Bay City, Midland and can be expanded to include Mt. Pleasant as well.
- The Flint area is included in Mid Michigan, and can also be considered a part of Metro Detroit.
- The Thumb is a peninsula that surrounded by Lake Huron in the east-central area of the state. This area is sometimes dubbed the Blue Water Area.

=== Other definitions ===
Central or Mid Michigan can also include areas that are referred to as Southern Michigan. This is loosely defined and can refer to a region in the south-central portion of the state characterized by the Irish Hills. The region includes the Adrian, Jackson, and Hillsdale areas which are also considered a part of Southeast Michigan.

Portions of Central or Mid Michigan can overlap with portions of Western Michigan. For example, areas of Montcalm County could fall into both regions, with the west side of the county such as Greenville aligning with West Michigan, and eastern portions identifying more with Central Michigan.

Also, some areas may overlap with what is known as Northern Michigan. These areas, such as Clare, Gladwin, and Arenac County are along the border of the two regions and can be considered parts of both, depending on your frame of reference.

Portions of Metro Detroit can overlap with Central Michigan, especially the counties of Genesee, Lapeer, Livingston and St. Clair are statistically included in Metro Detroit however geographically lie in Mid Michigan.

== Geography ==
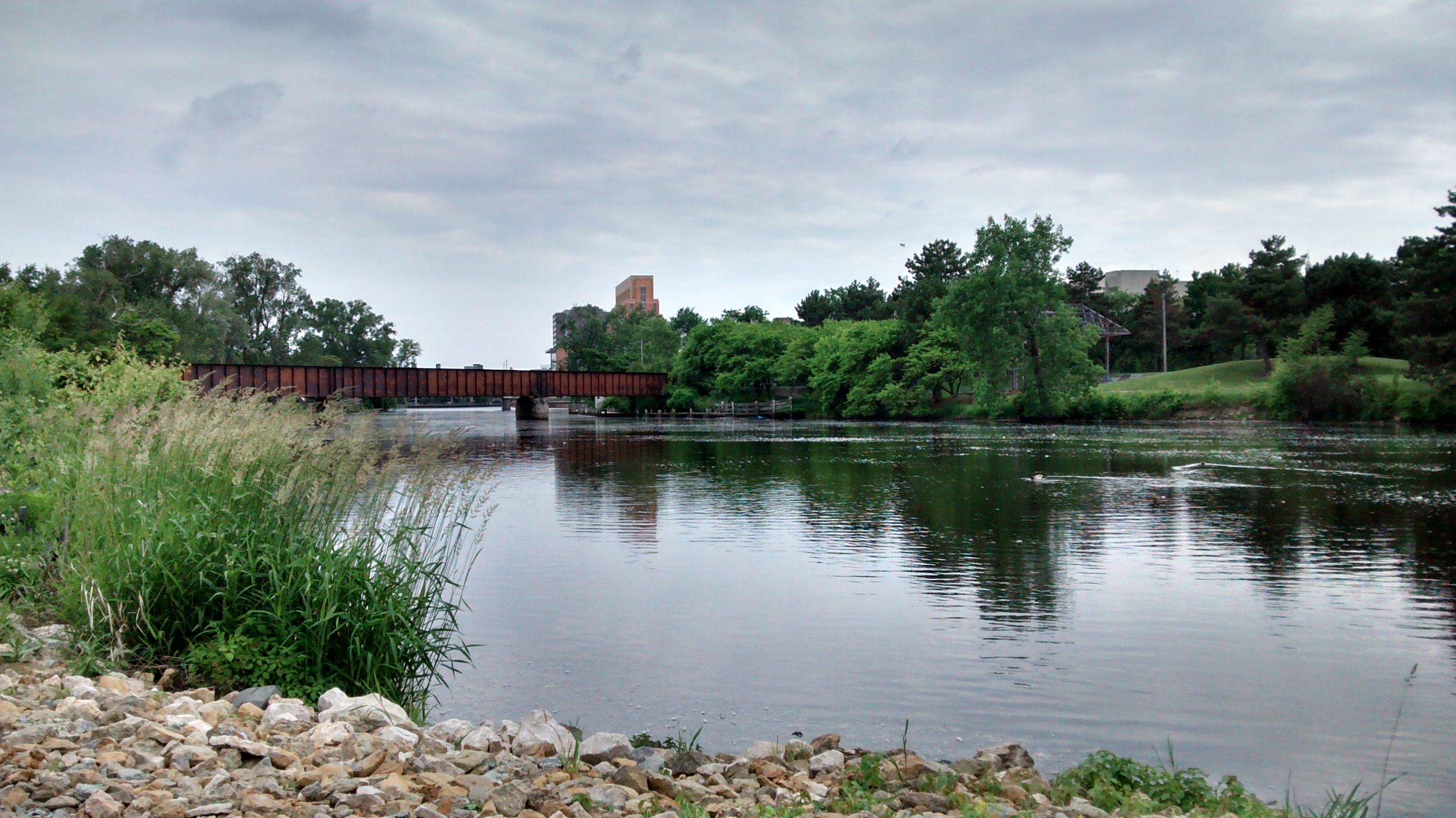
Grand River in Lansing.

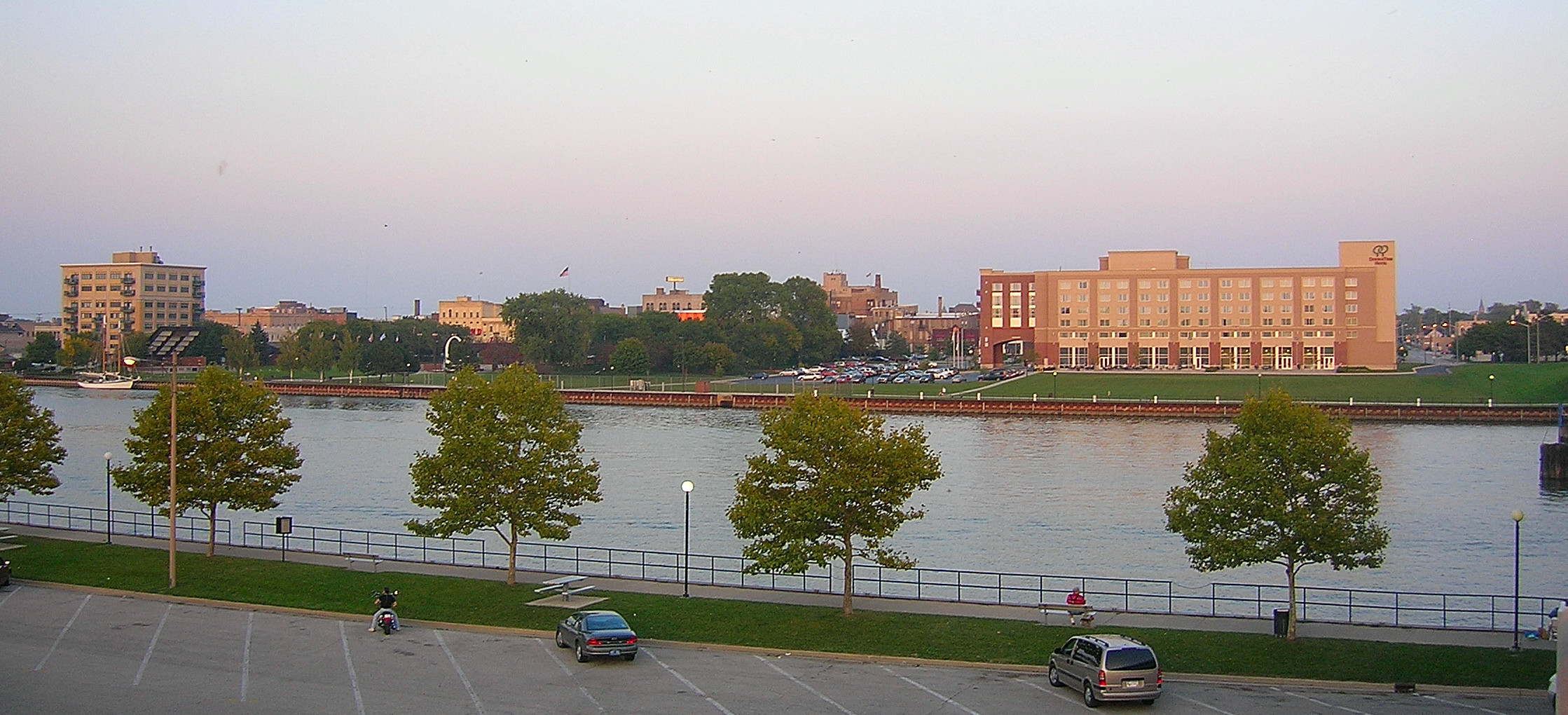
Bay City, looking East from Veterans Memorial Park

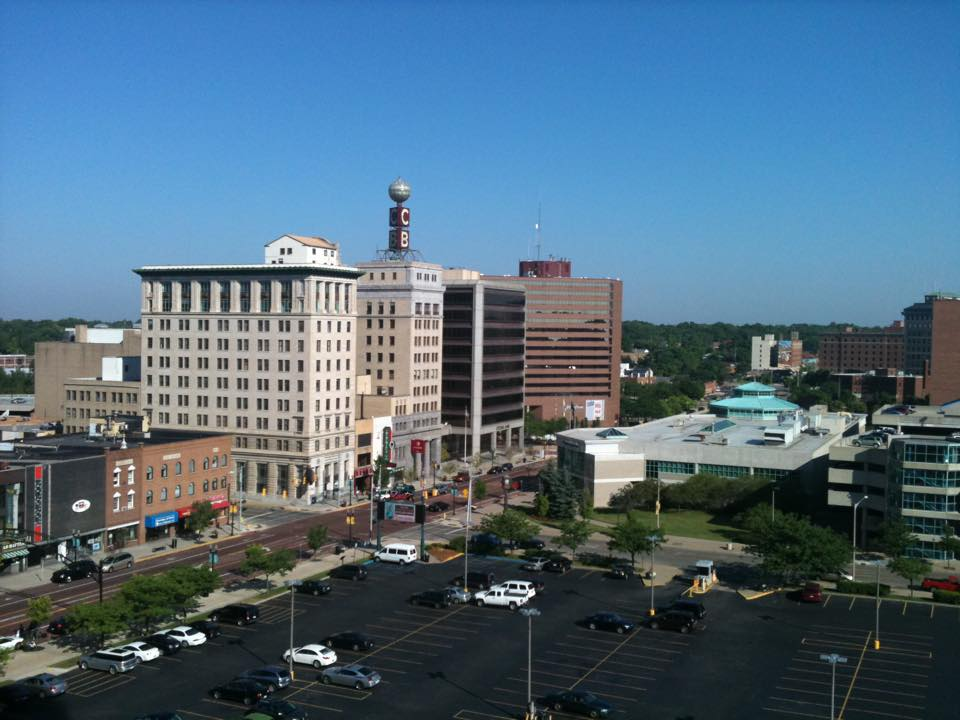
Downtown Flint looking northwest, taken from the former Genesee Towers.

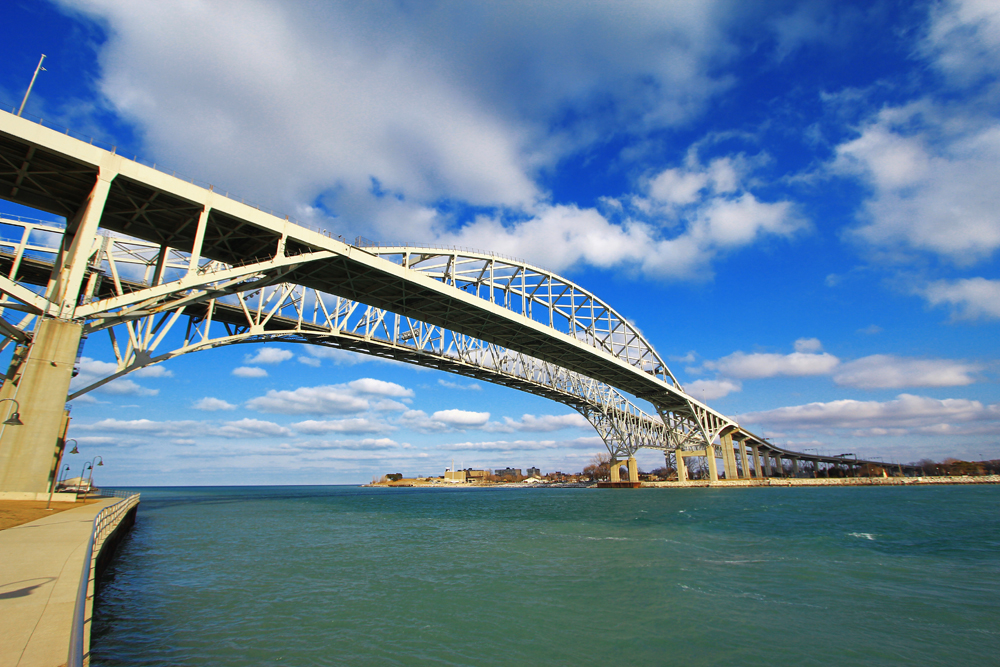
Port Huron's Blue Water Bridges, an important international crossing.

The region includes many rivers including the Grand River, Red Cedar River, Saginaw River, Tittabawassee River, Shiawassee River and Flint River. A drainage divide occurs in Central Michigan, causing the Grand River to flow west into Lake Michigan and the Saginaw River to empty into the Saginaw Bay. The terrain has rolling hills and plains with fertile soil. Agriculture dominates in the rural areas, where corn, soybeans, sugar beets, and hay are grown. The region has mostly small towns with a few cities of notable size. Most of the area is part of the Roman Catholic Diocese of Lansing or Roman Catholic Diocese of Saginaw.

=== Principal cities ===
Central Michigan has several cities of regional and geographic importance:

- Lansing, is the capital of Michigan and centrally located in the Lower Peninsula. It is the fifth largest city in the state. The Lansing-East Lansing metropolitan area is the third largest metro area in Michigan.
- Flint is the sixth largest city in the state and an important center for Michigan's automotive industry.
- The Tri-Cities area includes Midland, Bay City, and Saginaw. The Saginaw, Midland, and Bay City metropolitan area is the fifth largest metro area in Michigan.

=== Counties included ===
==== Lansing area ====
- Clinton
- Eaton
- Ingham

==== The Thumb area ====
- Huron
- Tuscola
- Sanilac
- St. Clair

==== Flint and Tri-Cities area ====
- Arenac
- Bay
- Clare
- Genesee
- Gladwin
- Gratiot
- Isabella
- Lapeer
- Midland
- Saginaw
- Shiawassee

== History and culture ==
Central Michigan has a rich and varied culture, including European farmers who settled in rural areas to work the land and ethnic minorities populating the area's urban centers to make a living in the automobile industry.

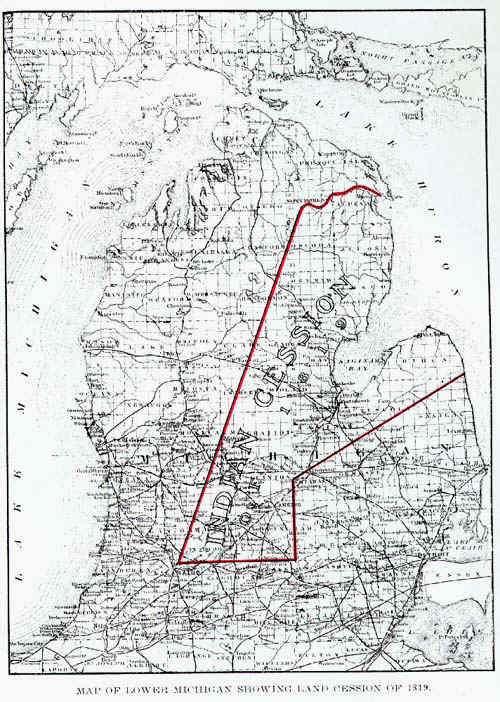
The territorial effects of the Treaty of Saginaw.

The Mid-Michigan area was predominately Ojibwe territory prior to colonization. One of the first European settlements in the region was the French Fort St. Joseph in present-day Port Huron in 1686. The area that became Michigan opened up to European settlement following the French and Indian War. Later in the 1800s Lewis Cass would negotiate the Treaty of Saginaw, in which Ojibwe land was handed over to form much of present-day Mid-Michigan. The opening of the Erie Canal brought vast numbers of settlers to the region, as population started growing northward from Ohio. The first settlers to the area cleared the land for the lumber industry. Forests of the Thumb and Saginaw Valley provided much of the lumber to feed the growing United States. The convenient access to transportation provided by the Saginaw River and its numerous tributaries fueled a massive expansion in population and economic activity. As the trees were being cut down in the region, logs were floated down the rivers to sawmills located in Saginaw, destined to be loaded onto ships and later railroad cars. Flint was also a lumber boom town, with the city turning lumber into carriages and wagons, which would later give way to the automobile industry.

Michigan became a state in 1837, with the State Capitol in Detroit until the winter of 1847 when the state constitution required that the capital be moved from Detroit to a more central and safer location in the interior of the state. Many were concerned about Detroit's proximity to British-controlled Canada, which had captured Detroit in the War of 1812. The United States had recaptured the city in 1813, but these events led to the dire need to have the center of government relocated away from hostile British territory. There was also concern with Detroit's strong influence over Michigan politics, being the largest city in the state as well as the capital city. Unable to publicly reach a consensus because of constant political wrangling, the Michigan House of Representatives privately chose the Township of Lansing out of frustration. When announced, many present openly laughed that such an insignificant settlement was now the capital city of Michigan. Two months later, Governor William L. Greenly signed into law the act of the legislature officially making Lansing Township the state capital.

Persons of European ancestry have formed the overwhelming majority of the population since the late 19th century. Farmers, mostly of English and Scots-Irish immigrants, many of whom arrived from Canada. Other settlers of the same ancestry migrated from eastern states such as New York, and Pennsylvania, as well as from New England. After the land had been lumbered off, farming dominated the rural landscape of Central Michigan. Corn, soy beans, navy beans, and sugar beets are now commercially grown in these areas today. Later 19th- and 20th-century residents included Polish and German immigrants who migrated from Europe through the Detroit area. Many of the customs, much of the regional lifestyle, and even the local accent, strongly reflect these origins. Saginaw County, in particular Frankenmuth, is such an example of Bavarian Culture in Mid-Michigan. On the eastern edge of the region, a large Canadian influence can be found in St. Clair County where Canadian culture and language has become integrated cities along the Canada–US border. Huron County in the Thumb has a heritage of Polish ancestry, while Clare is known for its Irish roots.

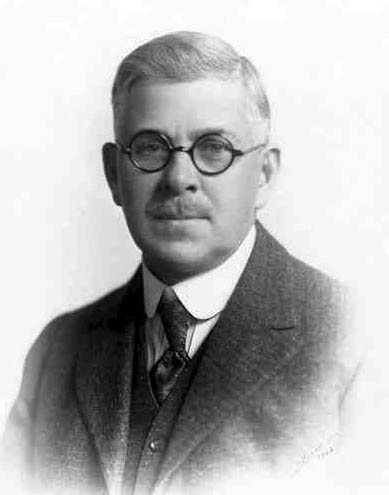
Ransom Eli Olds, the founder and namesake of Oldsmobile.

The state's economy underwent a transformation at the turn of the 20th century. Many individuals, including Ransom E. Olds, John and Horace Dodge, Henry Leland, David Dunbar Buick, Henry Joy, Charles King, and Henry Ford, provided the concentration of engineering know-how and technological enthusiasm to start the birth of the automotive industry. In Lansing, Olds Motor Vehicle Company was founded in August 1897. The company went through many changes, including a buyout, between its founding to 1905 when founder Ransom E. Olds started his new REO Motor Car Company, which would last in Lansing for another 70 years. In Flint, William C. Durant's Buick became the largest manufacturer of automobiles by 1908. In 1908, Durant founded General Motors, filing incorporation papers in New Jersey, with headquarters in Flint. GM moved its headquarters to Detroit in the mid-1920s. Durant lost control of GM twice during his lifetime. On the first occasion, he befriended Louis Chevrolet and founded Chevrolet, which was a runaway success. He used the capital from this success to buy back share control. Flint would later be the site of the GM and United Auto Workers Flint sit-down strike.

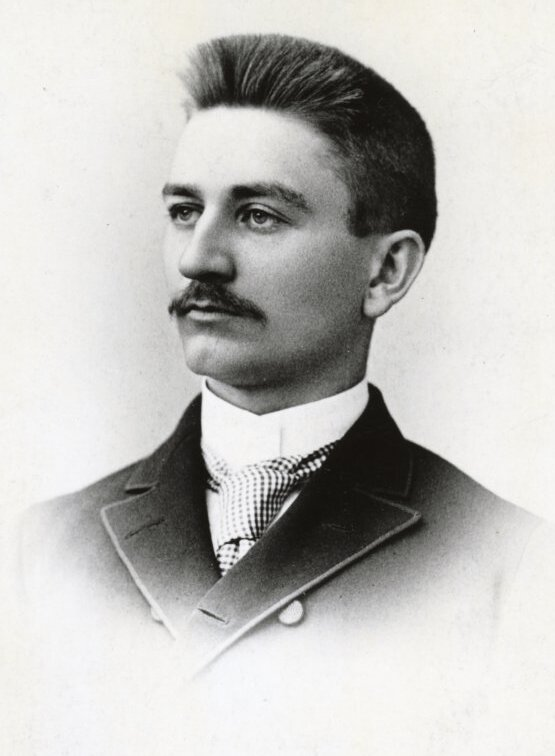
Herbert Henry Dow, the founder of Dow Chemical.

In 1897, Canadian-born chemist Herbert Henry Dow, who invented a new method of extracting the bromine that was trapped underground in brine at Midland, Michigan formed Dow Chemical. Dow originally sold only bleach and potassium bromide, and has since expanded to be the third largest chemical producer in the world.

Beginning in the late 1960s, urban areas including Flint, Saginaw, and Lansing experienced a large amount of deindustrialization and subsequent depopulation and urban decay. As auto jobs were sent elsewhere, rates of crime, unemployment and poverty increased. Initially, this took the form of "white flight" that afflicted many urban industrialized American towns and cities. This decline was exacerbated by the 1973 oil crisis and the U.S. auto industry's subsequent loss of market share to imports. The result meant white families moved to the suburbs, with leaving large hispanic and African-American populations in the urban centers. In Lansing, recent gentrification, the placement of refugees, and international students attending Michigan State have made the Greater Lansing a very culturally diverse area.

Michigan remains a leading auto-producing state in the U.S., with the industry primarily located throughout the Midwestern United States, Ontario, Canada, and the Southern United States. Michigan typically ranks third or fourth in overall Research & development (R&D) expenditures in the U.S. Mid-Michigan is home to one of the state's leading research institutions, Michigan State University which makes up the University Research Corridor. Michigan's public universities attract more than $1.5 B in research and development grants each year. Founded in 1855 in East Lansing as the nation's first land-grant institution, Michigan State University has been a pioneer in research and the cultural center of Mid-Michigan. The university has made significant contributions in agriculture and pioneered the studies of packaging, hospitality business, plant biology, supply chain management, music therapy, and communication sciences. Michigan State frequently ranks among the top 30 public universities in the United States and the top 100 research universities in the world.

== Economy ==
Straw bales in an area field.

Central Michigan's economy is primarily agricultural, and some automobile manufacturing.

=== Agriculture ===
Major crops grown in this region include corn, sugar beets, and soy beans. The Michigan Sugar Company, which is a cooperative owned by 1,250 farmers, operates factories in Bay City, Caro, Croswell, and Sebewaing.

Livestock and dairy farms also make up the agricultural landscape of Central Michigan. Koegel Meat Company is headquartered in Flint and is a major producer of sausages and processed meats. Lansing based Quality Dairy Company is a major producer of milk and ice cream in the region.

=== Financial ===
The largest financial institution in the region is Detroit- headquartered TCF Financial Corporation, which is also the second largest Michigan-based bank. Citizens Republic Bancorp was formerly headquartered in Flint, and has since been acquired by FirstMerit Corporation, which has been sold to Ohio's Huntington Bank. Grand Rapids-based Independent Bank has a large presence in the region as well. Regional banks and credit unions also exist throughout Central Michigan. One of those is Michigan State University Federal Credit Union which is the largest university-based credit union in the world.

=== Government ===
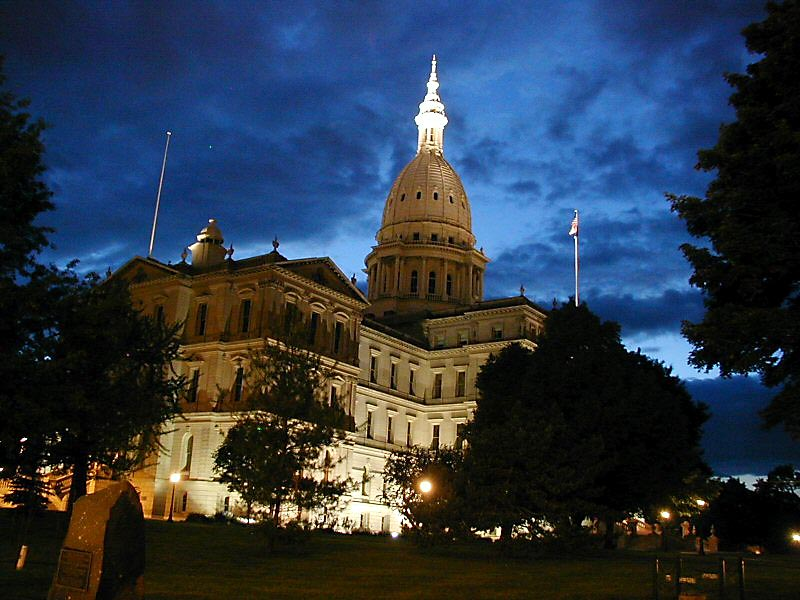
The Michigan State Capitol in Lansing.

Since Lansing is the State Capitol, the number one employer in the Greater Lansing area is the State of Michigan, either with the Michigan Legislature, court system, or executive agencies.

The Michigan State Police is headquartered in Lansing, and formerly called East Lansing Home. MSP also has regional posts in Mt. Pleasant, Bay City, Caro, Flint, and Lapeer.

=== Healthcare ===
McLaren Health Care Corporation is a major employer in the region, as a non-profit operating nine hospitals in the state. McLaren is headquartered in Flint and has hospitals in Flint, Lansing, Lapeer, Bay City, Mt. Pleasant, and Port Huron.

Other major healthcare corporations include Sparrow Health System in Lansing, Hurley Medical Center in Flint, Covenant Hospital in Saginaw, and Lake Huron Medical Center in Port Huron. Furthermore, the Michigan State University College of Human Medicine has locations across the region, as does the University of Michigan Health System. Under the name MidMichigan Health, U of M operates hospitals in Clare, Gladwin, Alma, and Midland.

=== Insurance ===
Central Michigan, specifically the Greater Lansing area, is home to many statewide and national insurance companies. Auto-Owners Insurance is headquartered in Delta Township and is the largest such company headquartered in the state. In downtown Lansing, workers compensation insurance company Accident Fund has its headquarters. Founded in Jackson but having headquarters in Lansing, Jackson National Life is a life insurance company serving 49 states. Smaller insurer Frankenmuth insurance has its headquarters in Frankenmuth.

=== Manufacturing ===
General Motors operates the Flint Truck Assembly factory in Flint and Powertrain plants in Flint, Bay City, and Saginaw. Until 2004, Mid-Michigan (specifically Lansing) was also known for being the location of the main Oldsmobile plant for General Motors. The plant is now Lansing Grand River Assembly. GM also operates Lansing Delta Township Assembly in Eaton County.

The world headquarters of Nexteer Automotive, a car parts supplier, is located in Saginaw. S.C. Johnson and Son has a manufacturing facility in Bay City making Ziploc products. The Dow Chemical Company and Dow Corning have their world headquarters in Midland.

=== Power generation ===
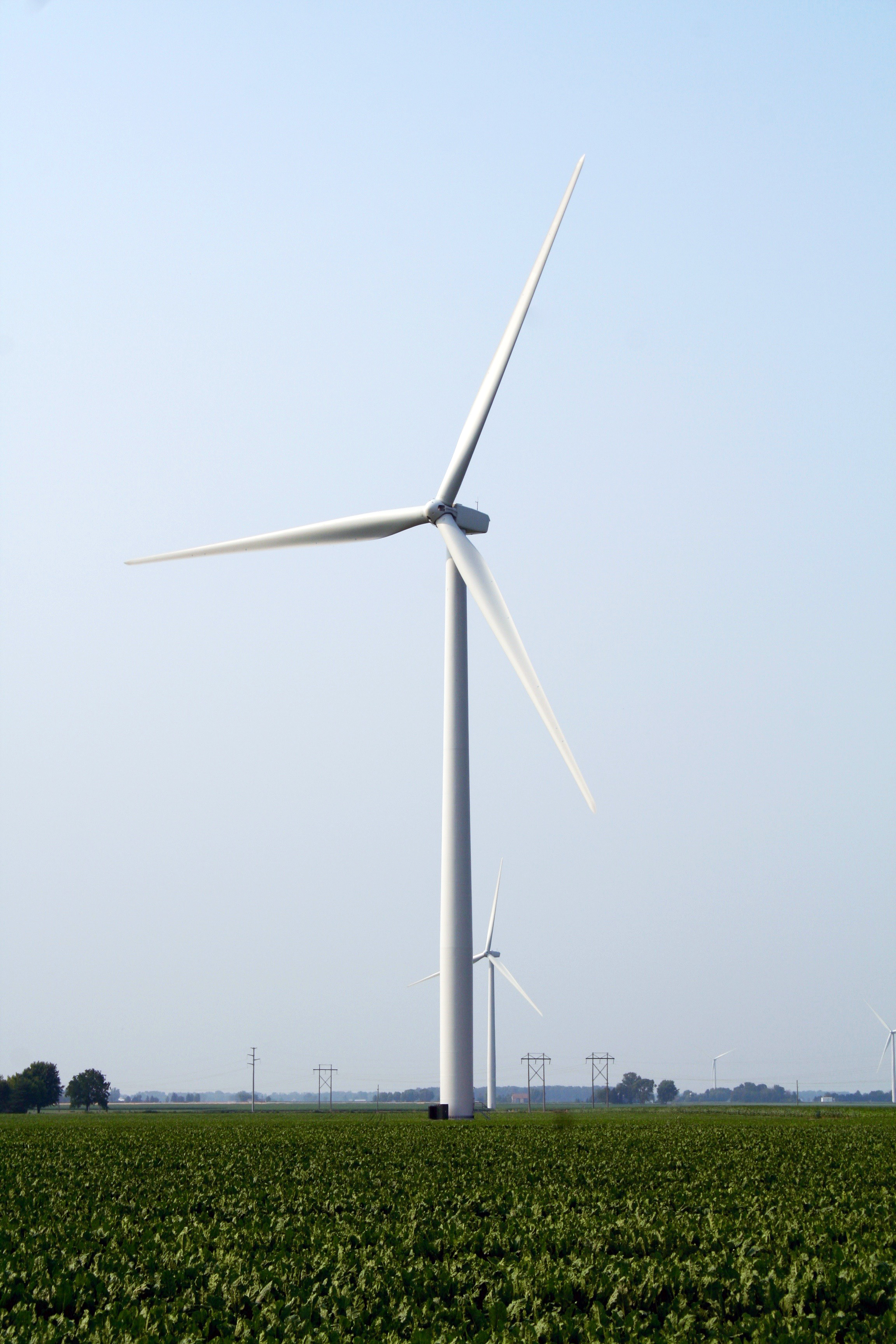
One of many wind farms in the region.

CMS Energy's subsidiary Consumers Energy and DTE Energy's Detroit Edison both have a presence in this region and provides much of the electrical power for the lower peninsula of Michigan. CMS operates the Karn-Weadock facility in Essexville, and DTE has plants in Harbor Beach, Greenwood Township, and two plants in East China (St. Clair Power Plant and Belle River Power Plant).

The Lansing Board of Water & Light has several of its own generating plants in the Greater Lansing area, and the Midland Cogeneration Venture is a partnership in Midland.

Renewable energies, specifically wind farms are also a rising form of electricity generation in this region. The counties of Gratiot, Tuscola, and Huron are home to many large wind farms. In Lapeer County, DTE Energy owns the largest solar farm in Michigan.

=== International trade corridor ===
The I-69 International Trade Corridor is a strategic commercial gateway between the Midwestern United States and Ontario, Canada, with multi-modal transportation infrastructure that offers a wide range of distribution options. The I-69 International Trade Corridor Next Michigan Development Corporation (NMDC) offers economic incentives to growing businesses, both existing and new, that utilize two or more forms of transportation to move their products and are located within the territory of the NMDC. The I-69 International Trade Corridor Next Michigan Development Corporation is the largest in the state of Michigan with 35 municipal partners.

Constituent counties of the trade corridor are: Shiawassee, Genesee, Lapeer, and St. Clair Counties.

== Colleges and universities ==
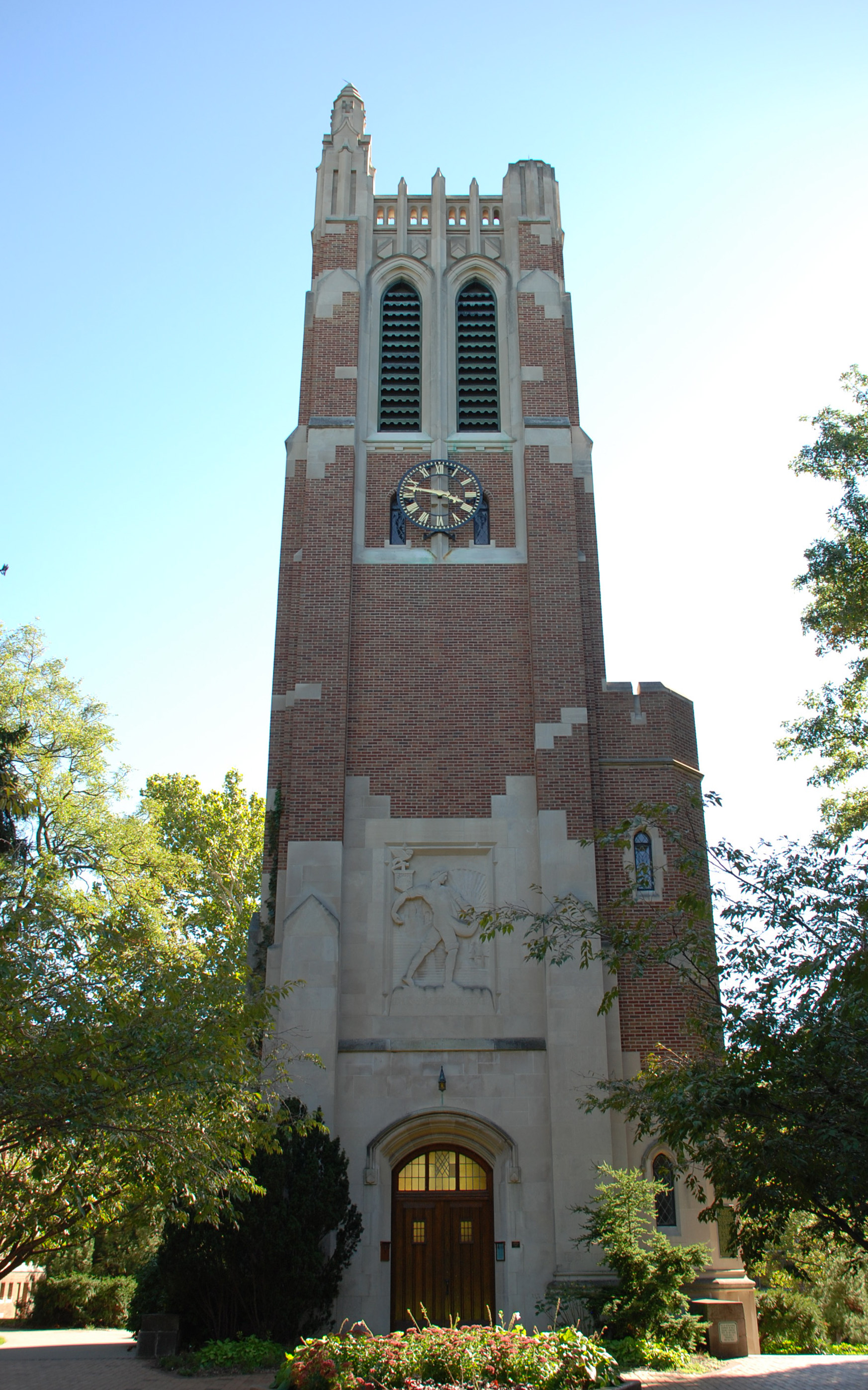
Beaumont Tower on Michigan State's campus.

Major educational institutions in Central Michigan include:

- Central Michigan University in Mount Pleasant
- Michigan State University in East Lansing
- Michigan State University College of Law in East Lansing
- Lansing Community College in Lansing
- Mid Michigan Community College in Harrison and Mt. Pleasant
- Mott Community College in Flint
- Northwood University in Midland
- St. Clair County Community College in Port Huron
- Alma College in Alma
- Olivet College in Olivet
- Saginaw Valley State University in University Center
- Thomas M. Cooley Law School (the nation's largest) is headquartered in Lansing.
- University of Michigan–Flint
- Delta College in University Center
- Kettering University in Flint
- Baker College (throughout different areas of Michigan)
- Davenport University (throughout different areas of Michigan)

== Media ==
=== Newspapers ===
The Lansing State Journal is the sole daily newspaper published in metropolitan Lansing, and is owned by Gannett, which also owns The Times Herald in Port Huron and USA Today. The Flint Journal is available in the Flint and Lapeer areas and is published four times a week. Editions of the Bay City Times, Midland Daily News and Saginaw News are available in the greater Tri-Cities area. The Times and the Saginaw News published three times a week, while the Midland Daily News publishes daily. The Great Lakes Bay Edition, a joint publication between the Saginaw News and the Bay City Times, focuses on those two cities, as well as Midland, and publishes once a week. The Hearst Corporation owns the Midland Daily News and the Huron Daily Tribune. Mount Pleasant is served by a daily newspaper called The Morning Sun.

The Detroit Free Press and The Detroit News are available throughout the area.

=== Radio ===
The region is served by multiple radio stations. For a complete listing of stations, see one of the following markets:

- Lansing Area
- Flint Area
- Greater Tri-Cities including Saginaw, Bay City, and Midland.
- Thumb Area including Port Huron, Sandusky, and Lapeer.
- South Central Michigan including Jackson, Adrian, and Hillsdale.
- North Central Michigan including, Mount Pleasant, Cadillac, and Alma.

=== Broadcast television ===
Television in the Central Michigan area varies from market to market. Availability of stations depends on the reception of aerial signals, as well as availability of cable and satellite in a particular area. In some areas of the region, broadcasts from all three markets can be received over the air.

- Lansing/Jackson Market
- Flint/Tri-Cities Market
- Cadillac / Traverse City Market

== Transportation ==
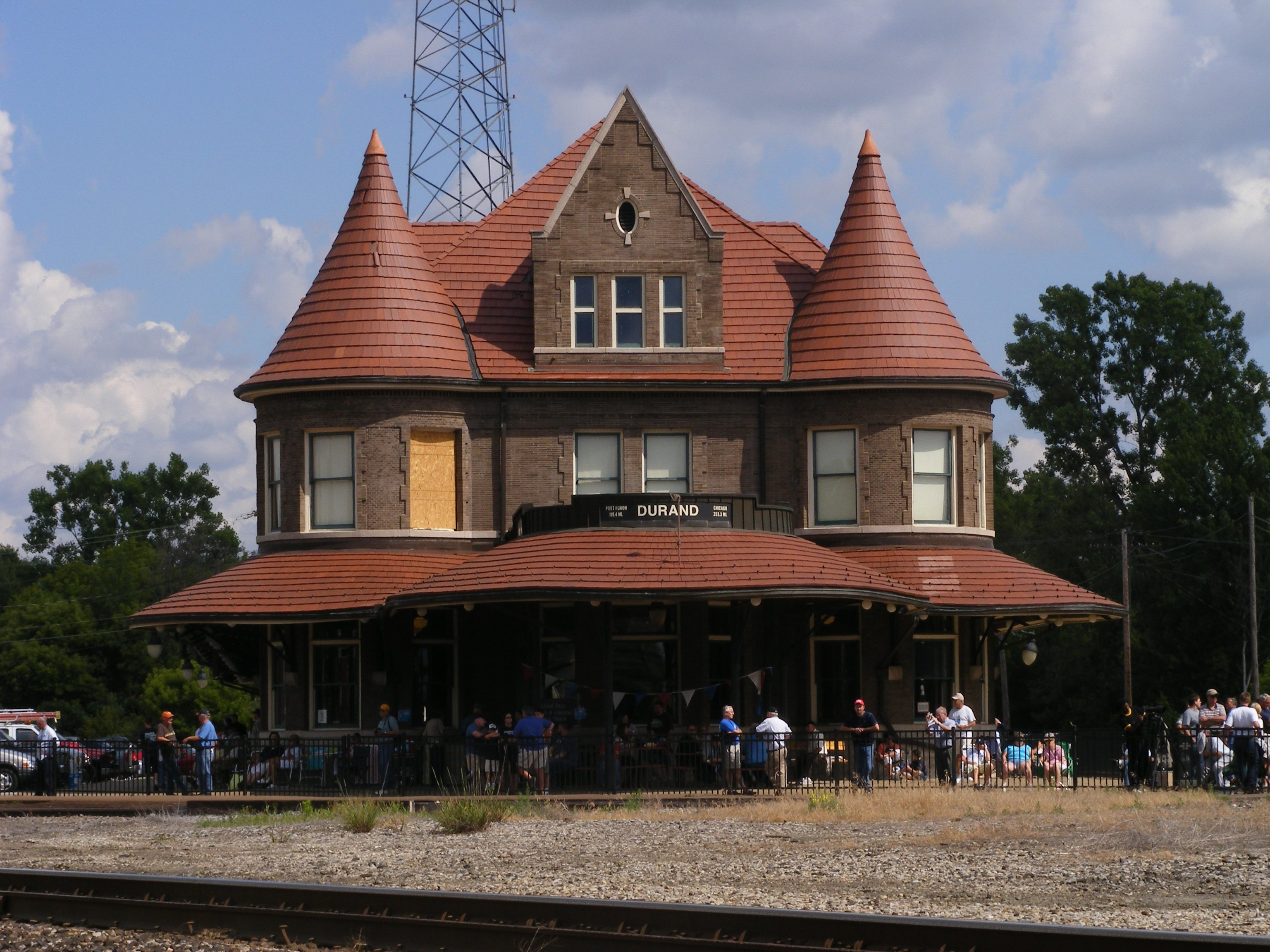
Durand Union Station, the crossroads for Michigan's railroads.

=== Airports ===
Scheduled airline service is offered from Lansing Capital Region International Airport. Airline service is also available from MBS International Airport near Midland, Michigan and Flint Bishop International Airport. Other portions are proximate to Gerald R. Ford International Airport, east of Grand Rapids, Michigan, and Kalamazoo/Battle Creek International Airport near Kalamazoo, Michigan.

=== Railroads ===
Passenger rail is provided by Amtrak and has stations in East Lansing, Durand, Flint, Lapeer, and Port Huron on its Blue Water line.

- The Great Lakes Central Railroad is a regional railroad operating from Petoskey to Ann Arbor.
- CSX owns a major line between Detroit and Grand Rapids, passing through Lansing. It also owns a line from Toledo to Flint, and another south of Port Huron.
- Grand Trunk Western Railroad, a part of the Canadian National system has a busy line between Port Huron and Chicago, passing through Flint, Durand, and Lansing.
- Mid-Michigan Railroad, owned by Genesee & Wyoming and operating in the Alma area.
- The Huron and Eastern Railway is also owned by Genesee and Wyoming and has lines north of Durand branching into the Thumb.
- Lake State Railway serves each of the Tri Cities and stretches into Northern Michigan.

=== Transit ===
- Bay Metropolitan Transportation Authority
- Blue Water Area Transit
- Capital Area Transportation Authority
- Flint Mass Transportation Authority
- Indian Trails
- Saginaw Transit Authority Regional Services

=== Major highways ===
Major trunkline routes throughout the Mid-Michigan area:

- I-69 from Port Huron to Fort Wayne, Indiana, connecting Flint and Lansing.
- I-75 is a major artery connecting the Tri-Cities with Flint and Detroit.
- I-475 business route to downtown Flint.
- I-675 business route to downtown Saginaw.
- I-94 from Port Huron to Chicago via Detroit, Jackson, and Battle Creek.
- I-96 from Grand Rapids to Detroit via Lansing.
- I-496 (R.E. Olds Freeway) in the Lansing area.
- US 10 an east–west route between Ludington and Bay City, connecting multiple communities in between.
- US 23 co-signed with I-75 through much of the region.
- US 127 comes from the south, through Lansing, and ends its 758-mile-long (1,220 km) journey at Grayling. It directly connects Northern Michigan (and the Mackinac Bridge via I-75) to Lansing, Ohio, Kentucky and Tennessee (all the way down to Chattanooga US 127 is the direct link between the state capital in Lansing and the Ingham County seat in Mason.
- M-13 runs roughly the same route as I-75 in the Genesee County/Shiawassee County border, the Saginaw County/Genesee County border, then into Bay County, and eventually terminates to the south of Standish in Arenac County.
- M-15 runs north and south through Genesee County and Tuscola County and terminates in Bay City.
- M-20 is an east–west highway connection Mt. Pleasant with Midland
- M-21 runs east and west, roughly the same route as I-69 in Genesee County and is a direct east–west route connecting St. Johns and Owosso.
- M-24 runs north and south in Lapeer County and Tuscola County.
- M-25 is a highway of an arc-like shape closely following the outline of the Thumb along the Lake Huron/Saginaw Bay shoreline between Port Huron and Bay City. It is generally a scenic drive.
- M-43 is a highway in southwestern and central Michigan from South Haven to Webberville. is east–west surface route nearly bisects the Lower Peninsula of Michigan latitudinally.
- M-46— a cross peninsular road, running across the entire mitten including the thumb—from Port Sanilac on the Lake Huron shore; through Saginaw near Saginaw Bay; and then on to Muskegon on the Lake Michigan shore. This east-west surface route nearly bisects the Lower Peninsula of Michigan latitudinally.
- M-52 is a north–south highway connecting Webberville, Perry, Owosso and St. Charles.
- M-53 (Van Dyke Road) is a gateway route to the Thumb of Michigan, carrying vacationers to the resorts and cottages on Saginaw Bay and Lake Huron in the vicinity of Caseville and Port Austin. It goes up the middle of the Thumb, and directly connects in Macomb County, Michigan to the M-53 expressway.
- M-54 Dort Highway, a main road leading into Flint running roughly the same route as I-475, then follows I-75 to Birch Run

== Notable people ==
More comprehensive lists are available at individual cities, villages, etc.

=== Lansing ===
- Jim Cash - Screenwriter Top Gun and other successful films
- Thom Hartmann - radio talk-show host & author
- Andy Hilbert - NHL hockey player
- John Hughes - film director
- Magic Johnson - NBA basketball star
- Lisa Kron - theatre actress & playwright
- Muhsin Muhammad - NFL football star
- Ransom E. Olds - Automobile Manufacturer; founded Olds Motor Vehicle Company
- Larry Page - co-founder of Google.com
- Greg Raymer - 2004 World Series of Poker champion
- Burt Reynolds - actor
- Steven Seagal - actor
- John Smoltz - MLB star and 1996 Cy Young Award winner
- Jim "Soni" Sonefeld - drummer & percussionist for Hootie & The Blowfish
- Debbie Stabenow - U.S. Senator - began political career in Ingham County
- Stevie Wonder - singer, attended the Michigan School for the Blind in Lansing (Born and raised in Saginaw, MI)
- Malcolm X - human rights activist

=== Tri-Cities and Flint ===
- Michael Moore - filmmaker, screenwriter, author, journalist, actor, and left-wing political activist from Davison.
- Bob Allman – Chicago Bears player (1936) (Bay City Central HS)
- Emil Anneke – German Forty-Eighter and US politician
- Robert Armstrong (1890–1973) - actor, best known for starring role in King Kong
- Rolf Armstrong (1889–1960) – painter and pin-up artist
- Edmund Arnold – father of modern news design
- Warren Avis – founder of Avis Rent A Car
- Howie Auer — Philadelphia Eagles player (1933)
- James A. Barcia – U.S. Representative, state representative, and state senator.
- Gary Bautell – military radio broadcaster with the American Forces Network
- James G. Birney (1792–1857) - presidential candidate 1844 and 1848 Liberty Party, a founder of Bay City
- Ruth Born (1925–2020) - All-American Girls Professional Baseball League player
- Nathan B. Bradley - first mayor of Bay City, U.S. Representative, state senator
- Betsy Brandt - actress, Breaking Bad, The Michael J. Fox Show
- Madonna – singer, actress, member of the Rock and Roll Hall of Fame, Grammy and Golden Globe award winner, was born in Bay City; she grew up in Rochester Hills, Michigan
- Spoke Emery – Major League Baseball player
- Eric Esch – Super Heavyweight Champion boxer, kickboxer, and martial artist
- Troy Evans (b.1977) – NFL linebacker, Houston Texans, New Orleans Saints
- John Garrels – silver and bronze Olympic medal winner
- Sanford M. Green, Michigan jurist and politician
- Ernie Gust – Major League Baseball player
- Harriet Hammond (1899–1991) - silent-film actress
- Bill Hewitt – Chicago Bears 1932–1936, Philadelphia Eagles 1937–1939, Phil-Pitt Steagles, Pro Football Hall of Fame
- Alex Izykowski – 2006 Winter Olympics bronze medalist in short track speed skating
- Edward Jablonski (1923–2004) - author, music archivist and aviation-aerial warfare historian
- Jim Kanicki – Cleveland Browns, and New York Giants 1960–62 (Bay City Central HS)
- Thomas G. Kavanagh - Michigan Supreme Court justice
- Bruce LaFrance – Tantric musician
- John List – mass murderer
- Jason "The Michigan Kid" Lynch – professional billiards trick-shot artist
- George Kid Lavigne – boxer, world lightweight champion 1896, and inductee of International Boxing Hall of Fame (1998)
- Terry McDermott – 500m speed skating gold medalist in Innsbruck 1964 Winter Olympics
- John McGraw – businessman, co-founder of Wenona, Michigan, now part of Bay City, Cornell University philanthropist
- Tyler McVey (1912–2003) - actor

=== Thumb area ===
- Thomas Edison - Inventor and entrepreneur settled in Port Huron from 1854 to 1863.
- Brewster H. Shaw - retired United States Air Force colonel and former NASA astronaut from Cass City.
- Frank Murphy - Detroit mayor, Michigan governor, U.S. Attorney General and Justice of the United States Supreme Court born in Harbor Beach.
- Marguerite de Angeli, children's book author, Newbery Award winner
- Terry Knight, singer, DJ, manager, Terry Knight and the Pack, Grand Funk Railroad
- Jake Long, offensive lineman, Miami Dolphins
- Terry Nichols, accomplice in the Oklahoma City bombing
- Jim Slater, hockey player Atlanta Thrashers
- Obadiah Gardner - US Senator for Maine
- Terry McMillan - Award-winning author of Waiting to Exhale, and How Stella Got Her Groove Back
- Gabriel Rheaume - Writer - The Shores We Walk, from Deckerville.

== See also ==
- List of counties in Michigan
- Lower Peninsula of Michigan
- Michigan
