= Quality Dairy Company =

Quality Dairy, a Lansing, Michigan based family owned business

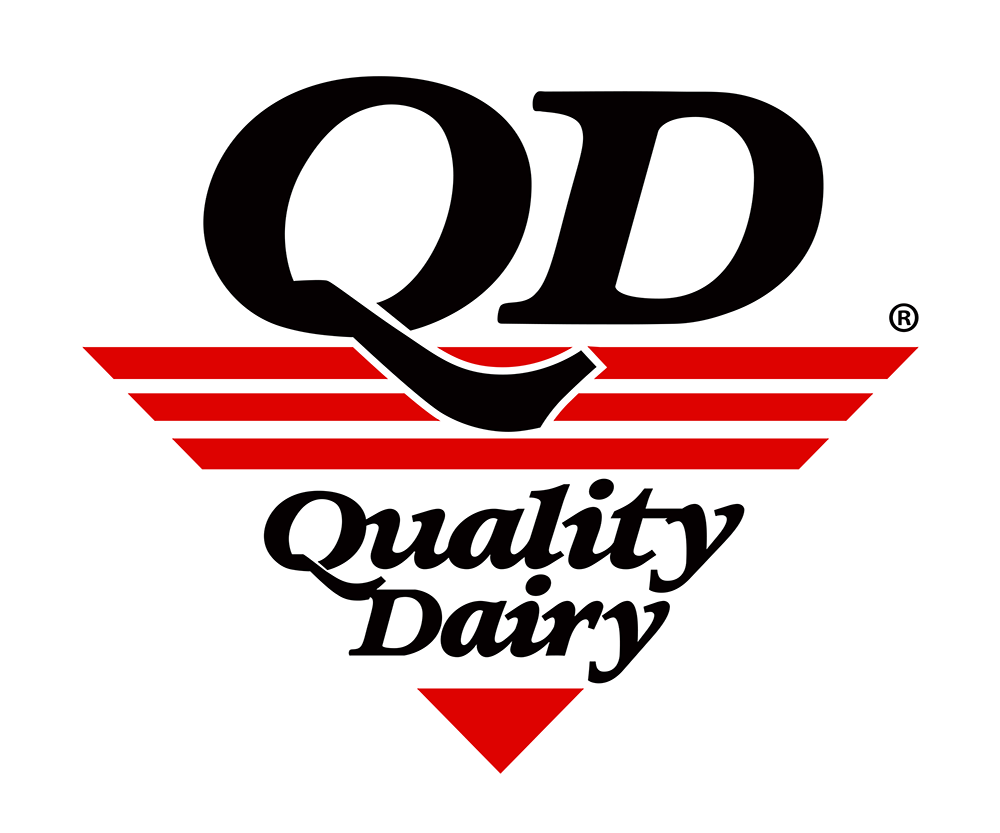

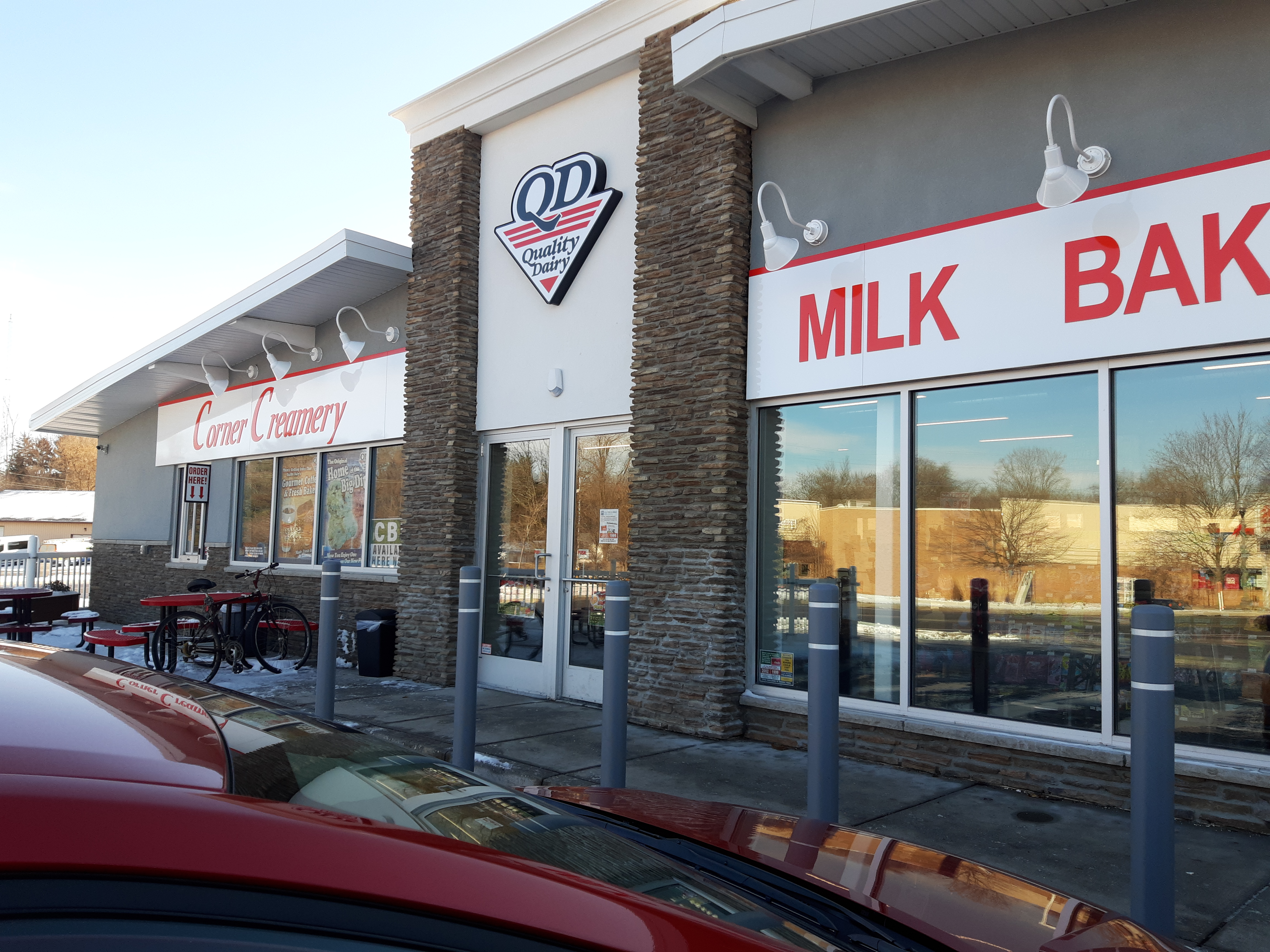
- Quality Dairy store in Holt
- Type: Private
- Industry: Retail (convenience stores)
- Founded: 1936; 90 years ago
- Founders: Gregory J. Martin and Harvey Mack
- Headquarters: Lansing, Michigan, United States
- Number of locations: 26
- Key people: Ken Martin (president)
- Products: Dairy, baked goods, prepared foods, various assortment of beverages, gasoline, plastic molds
- Website: qualitydairy.com

Quality Dairy Company (also known as QD) is a family-owned dairy, bakery, and retail/convenience store chain in the Lansing, Michigan metro area.The first Quality Dairy Store opened in 1936 and as of 2026 there are 26 retail locations in the Mid-Michigan area. Quality Dairy Company's headquarters is located near REO Town in Lansing and operates its Dairy Plant and Bakery Plant from central Lansing as well.

Quality Dairy has been one of Mid-Michigan's largest employers for over 50 years and produces over 150 different products in its Lansing area facilities. As of February 2026, the company employs over 500 people.

Ken Martin serves as president of the company.

== History ==
Quality Dairy Company was founded in March 1936 by Gregory J. Martin and Harvey Mack. The first store was located at 1406 South Washington Avenue. The original company mission included providing bottled milk on a cash and carry basis from small neighborhood milk stores.

In 1940, Quality Dairy Company started producing, distributing, and selling ice cream. Since then, the stores gradually expanded their offerings beyond dairy products to include grocery and convenience items. Dipped ice cream was added in 1969.

In 1955, Quality Dairy Company’s ownership changed. Harvey Mack sold to Gregory J. Martin who brought in three additional family owners shortly thereafter.

As of 2016, Quality Dairy Company operated 27 stores throughout Greater Lansing. All but two locations sell beer and wine and many sell packaged liquor. Some locations offer gasoline while others have laundromats.

In addition to retail stores, Quality Dairy Company operates its central production and distribution facility, QD Central, which includes its bakery, commissary and deli distribution center.

== Dairy plant ==
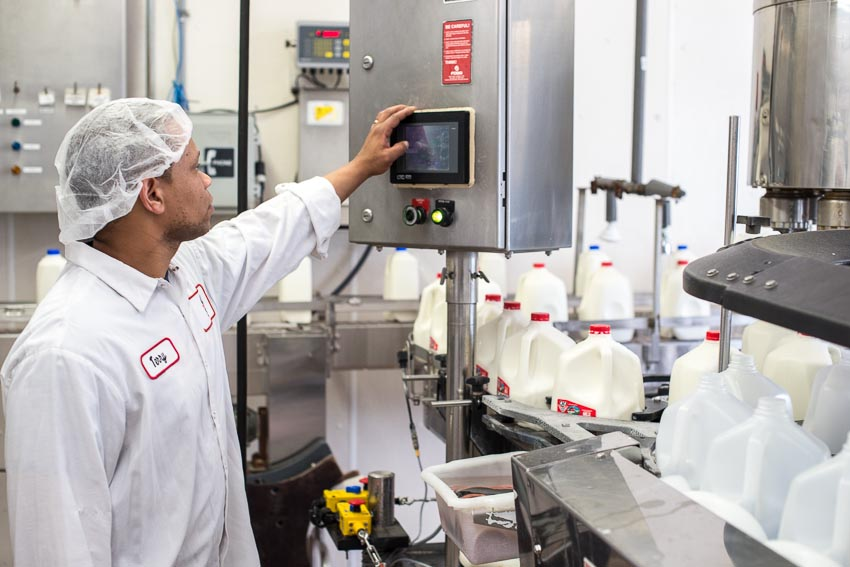
Interior of the dairy plant in Lansing

Quality Dairy Company was founded when there were a large number of dairies in Ingham County. Today, the company distributes milk from the local dairy farms to its stores daily. The company also produces other products such as flavored milks, juices, fruit drinks, and chip dip, all of which are distributed from its central hub, Quality Dairy Central, located just south of Lansing's REO Town. The company also offers its own brand of ice cream in a variety of flavors.

== Quality Dairy bakery plant ==
The Quality Dairy Bakery started in 1970 in the back room of one of the stores. When the bakery outgrew the space, it moved to a larger location. Today, the bakery is housed in a 37,000 sq. ft. facility in Lansing. The Quality Dairy Commissary operates in the same facility.

The bakery produces over 45 varieties of donuts, including classic cake donuts and yeast raised varieties. It also offer cookies, muffins, pastries, and other baked goods.

== Quality Dairy commissary ==
The Quality Dairy Commissary was founded in the mid-1970s. The commissary provides a wide variety of food items to the stores five days a week.
