= Independent Bank (Michigan) =

American Bank

Independent Bank Corporation
- Type: Public
- Traded as: Nasdaq: IBCP; Russell 2000 Index component
- Industry: Banking
- Founded: 1864; 162 years ago
- Headquarters: Grand Rapids, Michigan
- Key people: Michael M. Magee, Jr. (chairman); Brad Kessel (CEO & president)
- Revenue: ▲US$197.914 Million (Fiscal Year Ended 31 December 2020)
- Operating income: ▲US$69.481 Million (Fiscal Year Ended 31 December 2020)
- Net income: ▲US$56.152 Million (Fiscal Year Ended 31 December 2020)
- Total assets: ▲US$4.204 Billion (Fiscal Year Ended 31 December 2020)
- Total equity: ▲US$389.522 Million (Fiscal Year Ended 31 December 2020)
- Number of employees: 911 (2017)
- Website: independentbank.com

Independent Bank is a bank headquartered in Grand Rapids, Michigan. The bank has 62 branches, all of which are in Michigan.

== History ==
The bank traces its roots to First National Bank of Ionia, which was founded in 1864.

In 1896, relinquished its national charter and obtained a state charter, reorganized as State Savings Bank of Ionia.

in 1952, changed name to First Security Band.

In 1974, Independent Bank Corporation was established as the bank holding company.

In 1985, Independent Bank Corporation joined the NASDAQ stock exchange.

In 2003, the company acquired Mepco Insurance Premium Finance. Mepco was sold in 2017.

In March 2007, the bank acquired 10 branches from TCF Financial Corporation.

In December 2008, the bank received a $72 million investment from the United States Department of the Treasury as part of the Troubled Asset Relief Program. The investment was returned in 2013.

In December 2012, the bank sold 21 branches to Chemical (now TCF Financial Corporation).

In 2015, the bank closed 6 branches.

In 2018, the bank acquired Traverse City State Bank.
