= Saginaw Transit Authority Regional Services =

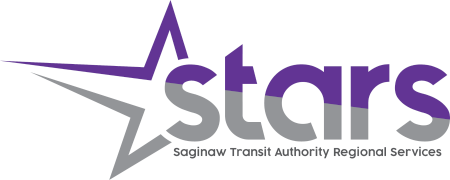

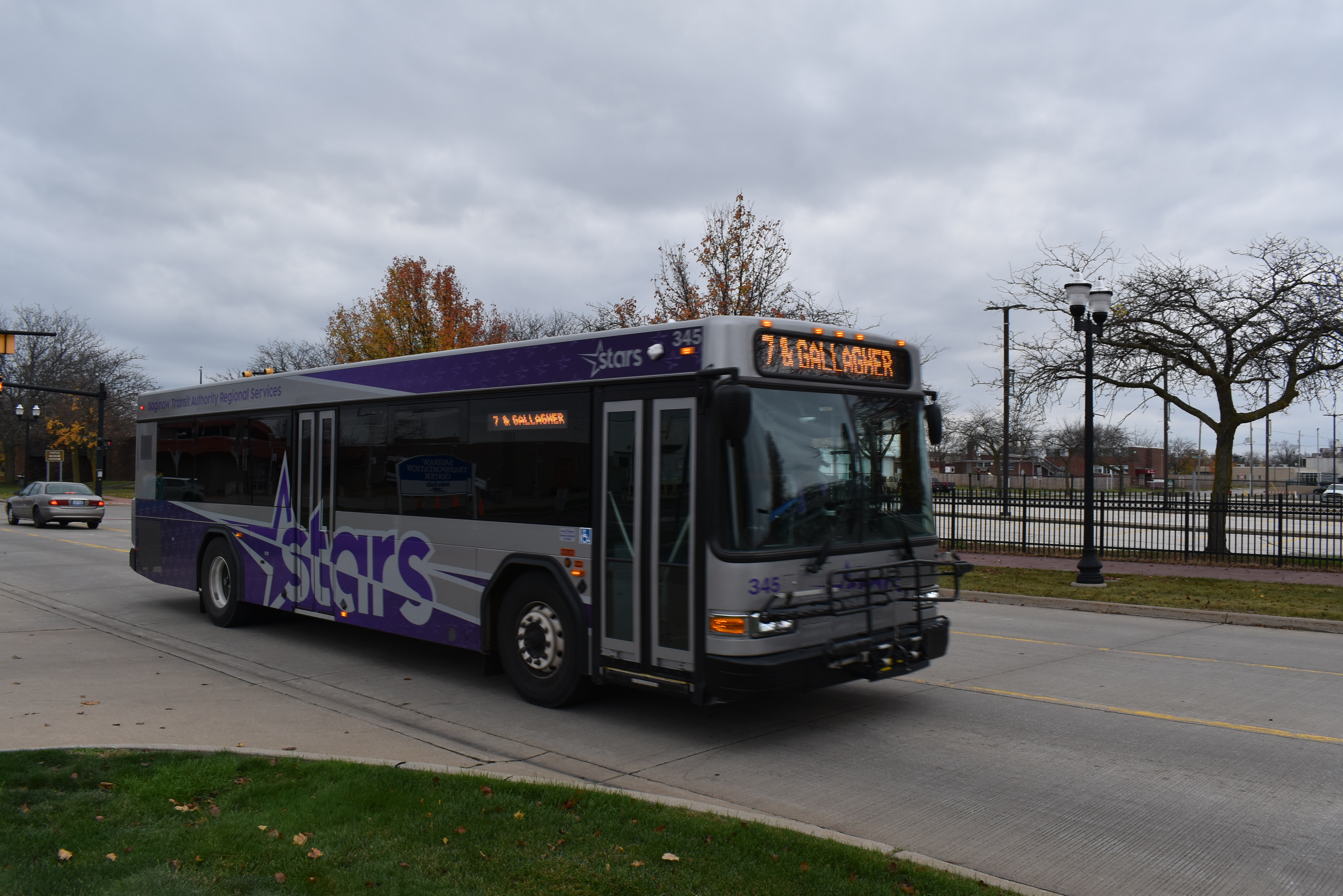
- Headquarters: 615 Johnson Street
- Locale: Saginaw, Michigan
- Service area: Saginaw County, Michigan
- Service type: Bus service, paratransit
- Routes: 8
- Stations: STARS Plaza, 615 Johnson St.
- Website: www.saginaw-stars.com

Saginaw Transit Authority Regional Services (STARS) is the operator of public transportation in Saginaw, Michigan. Ten local routes service the metropolitan area, and about a million passengers use the agency for transport each year. On July 14, 2023, a new route to Frankenmuth was inaugurated.

== Services ==
=== Fixed routes ===
- 1. State Street
- 3. Old Town
- 4. Buena Vista
- 5. Dixie-Genesee
- 6. Fashion Square
- 7. East Riverfront
- 8. Jefferson
- 9. Cardinal Square

These routes are available Monday–Friday 6:00 am to 8:00 pm, Saturday 8:00 am to 6:00 pm and depart from downtown every 60 minutes.

Fares are $1.50 for general public, $.75 for riders 62 or older with identification, those receiving Medicare with ID, Silver Card (ADA/Disabled) and children under 42". Transfers are free, simply ask the driver when boarding.

=== Other services ===
STARS Lift is a curb to curb service available for disabled riders and seniors over 62 with ID. These rides can be scheduled up to two weeks in advance. Fare is $2.75 each way with a gold card.

STARS Express service is available 24 hours, 7 days a week for riders' round the clock needs such as jobs, medical appointments and groceries. These rides can be scheduled up to 24 hours in advance. These rides are $5.25 each way.

Pigeon Express takes employees to Blue Diamond Steel & Huron Castings three times a day.

== Rosa Parks Transfer Plaza ==
Rosa Parks Transfer Plaza, located at 615 Johnson Street, serves as the primary transfer point in the STARS system providing an indoor waiting area for passengers. However, STARS has outgrown the facility and has proposed relocating their hub to a new location. Sites under consideration include the Potter Street Station, Riverview Plaza on Genesee Ave., and a site near the Saginaw United High School on Davenport Ave.

== See also ==
- List of bus transit systems in the United States
- Bay Metropolitan Transportation Authority
- Potter Street Station
