= Bay Metropolitan Transportation Authority =

Transportation in Bay City, Michigan, United States

- Headquarters: 1510 N Johnson St; Bay City, Michigan
- Service area: Bay City MSA
- Service type: Bus service, Dial-a-Ride
- Routes: 9
- Destinations: Auburn; Bay City; Linwood; Midland; Pinconning
- Annual ridership: 256,257 (2020)
- Website: baymetro.com

Bay Metropolitan Transportation Authority (Bay Metro) is the primary bus agency providing intra- and inter-city routes for the Bay City Metropolitan Statistical Area centered on Bay City, Michigan since 1974.

== History ==
Public transportation in Bay City began with the Bay City Street Railway Company, which operated horsecars starting in 1865. Electric streetcars began replacing the horsecars in 1889; by 1893 electric lines ran down Washington, Center, and Third Streets, meeting at Center and Washington; an interurban electric line connected Bay City to Saginaw, Flint, Detroit, and Cincinnati by 1895. The West Bay City Street Railway Co. (1889) and Union Street Railway Co. (1892) eventually merged as the Bay Cities Consolidated Railway Co. (1893), which underwent several name changes until the streetcars were replaced by buses in 1921. From 1921 to 1974, public transportation was provided by private operators (Balcer Bros. and Hibblers Bay City Community Service) with one interruption between 1958 and 1959.

Bay Metropolitan Transportation Authority began operations in 1974; its headquarters were built in 1981 in Bay City, Michigan, and most fixed routes operate out of the Central Bus Station in downtown Bay City at 1124 Washington Avenue.

Bay Metro temporarily suspended service during the COVID-19 pandemic in Michigan; fixed-route service resumed on July 6, 2021, with Routes 1 and 4 following in late August.

=== Governance ===
Bay Metro is governed by a board of directors selected by the chair of the Bay County Board of Commissioners. The term of each Bay Metro board member is three years; the total membership has varied between nine and eleven.

== Services ==
Bay Metro operates nine fixed routes and a dial-a-ride point-to-point service branded DART.

Bay Metro fixed routes
Route no.	Terminus	via (Destinations)	Terminus	Trips (Headway)	Notes / Refs.
1 (North)	Central Bus Station (CBS)	Washington Ave, Wilder Rd, Huron Rd (Walmart, State Park, Huron Rd, Linwood, Pinconning)	CBS	7 RT; Mon–Fri (120 min.)	First bus operates inbound to CBS from Pinconning Gazebo.
2 (Eastside)	CBS	Madison Ave, McKinley Ave, Columbus Ave, Pine St, Center Ave (Smith Manor, Kroger, Meijer, Dep't. of Health & Human Services, Pineview, Center Ridge, Bay Regional Medical Center, Downtown Bay City)	CBS	12 (9) RT; Mon–Fri (Sat) (60 min.)	Reduced service on Saturdays.
3 (Southend)	CBS	Michigan Ave, Broadway Ave, Farragut St (Bay Area Family Y, McLaren Bay Uptown, Bradley House, Maloney Manor, Southend, Smith Manor)	CBS	12 (9) RT; Mon–Fri (Sat) (60 min.)	Reduced service on Saturdays.
4 (Regional)	CBS	Midland Rd (McLaren West Campus, Meijer, SVSU (transfer to STARS), Delta College, Auburn, Midland DHHS (transfer to Midland County Connection))	CBS	12 RT; Mon–Fri (60 min.)	First bus operates limited-stop schedule.
6 (Westside)	CBS	Bangor Rd, State Street Rd (Banks Area, Bay City Mall, Walmart, Alderwood Estates)	CBS	12 (9) RT; Mon–Fri (Sat) (60 min.)	Reduced service on Saturdays.
7 (Westside)	CBS	Henry St, Wilder Rd (Bangor Downs, John Glenn High School, Career Center, BaySide Health, Meijer, Kmart)	CBS	12 (9) RT; Mon–Fri (Sat) (60 min.)	Reduced service on Saturdays.
8 (Westside)	CBS	Midland St, Wenona St, Euclid Ave (Pine Towers, Allen Medical, Kroger (west), Westshore Estates, Salzburg)	CBS	12 (9) RT; Mon–Fri (Sat) (60 min.)	Reduced service on Saturdays.
10 (Eastside)	CBS	Center Ave, Pine Rd, 22nd St, Columbus Ave (Bay Regional Medical Center, Pineview, Center Ridge, Maloney Manor, Bradley House, Eastside Meijer and Kroger, McLaren Bay Uptown)	CBS	12 (9) RT; Mon–Fri (Sat) (60 min.)	Reduced service on Saturdays.
11 (Eastside / Essexville)	CBS	Washington Ave, Third St, Woodside Ave, Knight Rd, Pine St (Maplewood Manor, Baytown, Borton, Pine, Tradewinds, Saginaw Bay Estates, Eastside Medical Mall)	CBS	12 (9) RT; Mon–Fri (Sat) (60 min.)	Reduced service on Saturdays.

=== Fares ===
Fixed route fares are US$1, with discounts for students with a valid identification card ($0.75) and qualified individuals (seniors and disabled, $0.50). Single-ride DART fares are US$1.50.

=== Transfers ===
Riders on Route 4 may transfer to Saginaw Transit Authority Regional Services at the Saginaw Valley State University stop or to Midland County Connection at the Midland DHHS stop. No fare discounts are offered.

== Fleet ==
The fixed-route transit fleet primarily uses Gillig Advantage buses in 29' and 40' nominal lengths.
